= 2004–05 Indiana Pacers season =

NBA professional basketball team season

- Head coach: Rick Carlisle
- General manager: Larry Bird
- Arena: Conseco Fieldhouse

Results
- Record: 44–38 (.537)
- Place: Division: 3rd (Central); Conference: 6th (Eastern)
- Playoff finish: Conference Semifinals (lost to Pistons 2–4)
- Stats at Basketball Reference

Local media
- Television: FSN Midwest, WTTV
- Radio: WIBC

The 2004–05 Indiana Pacers season was the Pacers' 29th season in the National Basketball Association, and 38th season as a franchise. The Pacers finished third in the Central Division with a 44–38 record. This season also marked the final season for All-Star guard Reggie Miller.

== Offseason ==
=== NBA draft ===
Round	Pick	Player	Position	Nationality	College
1	29	David Harrison	C	United States	Colorado
2	60	Rashad Wright	G	United States	Georgia

=== Summary ===
Before the regular season began, the Indiana Pacers were ranked top in the Eastern Conference to possibly reach the NBA Finals, the team rosters contained names such as Reggie Miller, Jermaine O'Neal, Ron Artest, Stephen Jackson, Jamaal Tinsley, etc.

Al Harrington, a combination forward who had established himself as one of the best sixth-men in the NBA in the past two years, was dealt in the offseason to the Atlanta Hawks in return for swingman Stephen Jackson, after Harrington allegedly demanded that the Pacers start him or trade him.

== Roster ==
Indiana Pacers roster
Players

Pos.	No.	Player	Height	Weight	DOB	From
SF	91	Ron Artest (S)	6 ft 7 in (2.01 m)	244 lb (111 kg)	1979–11–13	St. John's
SF	24	Jonathan Bender	6 ft 11 in (2.11 m)	202 lb (92 kg)	1981–01–30	Picayune Memorial HS (MS)
PF	44	Austin Croshere	6 ft 9 in (2.06 m)	235 lb (107 kg)	1975–05–01	Providence
PF	32	Dale Davis	6 ft 11 in (2.11 m)	230 lb (104 kg)	1969–03–25	Clemson
C	54	John Edwards	7 ft 0 in (2.13 m)	275 lb (125 kg)	1981–07–31	Kent State
C	10	Jeff Foster	6 ft 11 in (2.11 m)	250 lb (113 kg)	1977–01–16	Texas State
PG	4	Eddie Gill	6 ft 0 in (1.83 m)	220 lb (100 kg)	1978–08–16	Weber State
C	13	David Harrison	7 ft 0 in (2.13 m)	280 lb (127 kg)	1982–08–15	Colorado
SF	1	Stephen Jackson	6 ft 8 in (2.03 m)	218 lb (99 kg)	1978–04–05	Butler CC
PG	8	Anthony Johnson	6 ft 3 in (1.91 m)	190 lb (86 kg)	1974–10–02	College of Charleston
SG	20	Fred Jones	6 ft 4 in (1.93 m)	210 lb (95 kg)	1979–03–11	Oregon
SF	33	James Jones	6 ft 8 in (2.03 m)	225 lb (102 kg)	1980–10–4	Miami (FL)
SG	31	Reggie Miller	6 ft 7 in (2.01 m)	185 lb (84 kg)	1965–08–24	UCLA
PF	7	Jermaine O'Neal	6 ft 11 in (2.11 m)	260 lb (118 kg)	1978–10–13	Eau Claire HS (SC)
C	62	Scot Pollard	6 ft 11 in (2.11 m)	278 lb (126 kg)	1975–02–12	Kansas
PG	11	Jamaal Tinsley	6 ft 3 in (1.91 m)	195 lb (88 kg)	1978–02–28	Iowa State

Coaches
Head coach
- Rick Carlisle (Virginia)

Legend
- (DP) Unsigned draft pick
- (FA) Free agent
- (S) Suspended
- Injured

Roster
Updated: 2012–10–10

== Regular season ==
=== The Malice at the Palace ===
The Pacers started off the season in an extremely strong fashion, but they took an unexpected turn at the end of a November 19 game against the defending NBA champion Detroit Pistons.

Towards the end of a blowout over the Pistons (who had eliminated the Pacers in the previous year's Eastern Conference finals) at The Palace of Auburn Hills, the Pacers' Ron Artest committed a hard foul against Ben Wallace. Wallace retaliated by pushing Artest, and Artest ran over to the scorer's table and laid atop it in order to prevent himself from being provoked into an altercation with Wallace. Pistons fan John Green threw a cup of beer at Artest, causing Artest to charge into the stands. The situation escalated to a full-scale brawl, with fans and several Pacers taking part. Stephen Jackson followed Artest into the stands while Jermaine O'Neal struck a fan who came onto the court. Jamaal Tinsley picked up a long-handled dustpan in order to use as a weapon, although he was never forced to use it. The game was called a Pacers victory with 45.9 seconds left on the clock and the score 97–82, and the Pacers left the floor amid a shower of beer and other beverages that rained down from the stands. Artest was suspended for the rest of the season without pay for his role in the 'basketbrawl.'

Several of the involved players were suspended by NBA Commissioner David Stern, but the hardest hit were Artest (suspended for the remainder of the regular season and playoffs), Jackson (suspended for 30 games), O'Neal (25 games), Wallace (6 games) and the Pacers' Anthony Johnson (5 games) (O'Neal's suspension was later reduced to 15 games by arbitrator Roger Kaplan, a decision that was upheld by U.S. District Judge George B. Daniels). O'Neal was charged with two counts of assault and battery, while Artest, Jackson, Johnson and David Harrison were charged with one count each.

Artest's suspension was the longest in NBA history for any suspension unrelated to substance abuse issues, keeping Artest out of a record 73 regular season games and 13 playoff games.

=== Aftermath ===
After the brawl and the consequences that followed, the Pacers fell downward in the Central Division. They went from a legitimate title contender with a record of 7–2, to a team that hovered around .500 in winning percentage, while the Detroit Pistons eventually became the Central Division champions with a 54–28 record. In addition to all the players rendered unavailable due to suspensions, the Pacers also struggled with several injuries to key players. In one game, the Pacers were forced to activate and dress an injured Jeff Foster even though the coaching staff had no intention of letting him play, just so that they could meet the NBA's requirement that each team has at least eight active players at the start of the game; if they did not activate an eighth player, they would have been forced to forfeit the game. Meanwhile, Fred Jones played 40 or more minutes in six consecutive games, simply because the Pacers did not have any shooting guards in reserve due to an injury to Reggie Miller. Despite the difficulties with the suspensions and injuries, the Pacers earned a sixth seed in the playoffs with a record of 44–38, due to strong play by many talented members of the Pacers' deep bench, including Jones, Anthony Johnson, and Austin Croshere, and a resurgence by Miller, whose career had been dwindling in recent years. Despite Miller's resurgence, he announced in February 2005 through his sister Cheryl Miller that he would be retiring from basketball at the conclusion of the 2004–05 season.

Throughout the season, the Pacers signed several different players to replace the bench players who had been promoted to starters, including Michael Curry, Marcus Haislip, and others. In a blowout win over the Milwaukee Bucks on January 4, 2005, Jermaine O'Neal scored a career high in points, with 55. During the fourth quarter, however, he asked to be removed from the game out of respect for Reggie Miller, because he did not wish to break Miller's franchise record of 57 points, which was set during the 1992–93 NBA season. An important reason for their strong finish was the re-acquisition of Dale Davis in March, who had been released by the New Orleans Hornets after being traded there by the Golden State Warriors. He played the final 25 games of the regular season and every playoff game, contributing a strong presence at center. However, Davis' signing coincided with an injury to Jermaine O'Neal that would knock him out for virtually the remainder of the regular season—indeed, O'Neal's first missed game due to his injury was Davis' first game back with the Pacers.

So despite the adversity they had gone through, the Pacers made the playoffs for the 13th time in 14 years. In the first round, Indiana defeated the Atlantic Division champion Boston Celtics in seven games, winning Game 7 in Boston by the decisive margin of 97–70.

The Pacers then advanced to the second-round against the Detroit Pistons, in a rematch of the previous year's Eastern Conference finals. The series featured games back at The Palace of Auburn Hills, the scene of the brawl that many assumed at the time had effectively ended the Pacers' season. After losing game 1, the Pacers won the next two games to take a 2–1 lead. However, the Pacers could not repeat their victories against the Pistons and lost the next 3 games, losing the series 4–2.

=== End of an era ===
The Pacers' last game of the playoffs was on May 19, 2005, at home; Reggie Miller, in his final NBA game, scored 27 points and received a huge standing ovation from the crowd. Despite Miller's effort, the Pacers lost, sending Miller into retirement without an NBA Championship in his 18-year career, all with the Pacers. Next season, Miller was honored by the Pacers during halftime of a game against the Phoenix Suns on March 30, 2006, when his #31 jersey was retired and he was presented with a Bentley Continental GT.

After the 2004–05 season, the Pacers completed a major overhaul of their roster, including moving Ron Artest, Anthony Johnson, Fred Jones, Austin Croshere, James Jones, and others over the next year.

Indeed, the Indiana Pacers' 2004–05 campaign, with the retirement of Reggie Miller and the Pacers' last winning season record until 2012, marked the end of an era in Pacers basketball.

=== Season standings ===
Central Division	W	L	PCT	GB	Home	Road	Div
y-Detroit Pistons	54	28	.659	–	32–9	22–19	8–8
x-Chicago Bulls	47	35	.573	7	27–14	20–21	8–8
x-Indiana Pacers	44	38	.537	10	25–16	19–22	9–7
e-Cleveland Cavaliers	42	40	.512	12	29–12	13–28	7–9
e-Milwaukee Bucks	30	52	.366	24	23–18	7–34	8–8

Eastern Conference
#	Team	W	L	PCT	GB
1	c-Miami Heat	59	23	.720	–
2	y-Detroit Pistons	54	28	.659	5
3	y-Boston Celtics	45	37	.549	14
4	x-Chicago Bulls	47	35	.573	12
5	x-Washington Wizards	45	37	.549	14
6	x-Indiana Pacers	44	38	.537	15
7	x-Philadelphia 76ers	43	39	.524	16
8	x-New Jersey Nets	42	40	.512	17
9	e-Cleveland Cavaliers	42	40	.512	17
10	e-Orlando Magic	36	46	.439	23
11	e-New York Knicks	33	49	.402	26
12	e-Toronto Raptors	33	49	.402	26
13	e-Milwaukee Bucks	30	52	.366	29
14	e-Charlotte Bobcats	18	64	.220	41
15	e-Atlanta Hawks	13	69	.159	46

== Playoffs ==
2005 playoff game log
First Round: 4–3 (home: 1–2; road: 3–1)

Game	Date	Team	Score	High points	High rebounds	High assists	Location Attendance	Series
1	April 23	@ Boston	L 82–102	Stephen Jackson (25)	Dale Davis (10)	Anthony Johnson (5)	FleetCenter; 18,624	0–1
2	April 25	@ Boston	W 82–79	Reggie Miller (28)	Anthony Johnson (7)	Anthony Johnson (7)	FleetCenter; 18,624	1–1
3	April 28	Boston	W 99–76	Reggie Miller (33)	Jermaine O'Neal (11)	Anthony Johnson (8)	Conseco Fieldhouse; 18,345	2–1
4	April 30	Boston	L 79–110	Stephen Jackson (24)	James Jones (9)	Anthony Johnson (7)	Conseco Fieldhouse; 18,345	2–2
5	May 3	@ Boston	W 90–85	Jermaine O'Neal (19)	Jermaine O'Neal (10)	Jamaal Tinsley (7)	FleetCenter; 18,624	3–2
6	May 5	Boston	L 89–92 (OT)	Jermaine O'Neal (26)	Dale Davis (14)	Anthony Johnson (4)	Conseco Fieldhouse; 18,345	3–3
7	May 7	@ Boston	W 97–70	Stephen Jackson (24)	Jeff Foster (12)	Jermaine O'Neal (6)	FleetCenter; 18,624	4–3

Conference Semifinals: 2–4 (home: 1–2; road: 1–2)

Game	Date	Team	Score	High points	High rebounds	High assists	Location Attendance	Series
1	May 9	@ Detroit	L 81–96	Jermaine O'Neal (22)	Jeff Foster (13)	Johnson, Miller (3)	The Palace of Auburn Hills; 22,076	0–1
2	May 11	@ Detroit	W 92–83	Jermaine O'Neal (22)	Jeff Foster (20)	Jamaal Tinsley (12)	The Palace of Auburn Hills; 22,076	1–1
3	May 13	Detroit	W 79–74	Reggie Miller (17)	Jeff Foster (12)	Jamaal Tinsley (6)	Conseco Fieldhouse; 18,345	2–1
4	May 15	Detroit	L 76–89	Stephen Jackson (23)	Jermaine O'Neal (13)	Anthony Johnson (6)	Conseco Fieldhouse; 18,345	2–2
5	May 17	@ Detroit	L 67–86	Jermaine O'Neal (14)	Dale Davis (12)	Jamaal Tinsley (5)	The Palace of Auburn Hills; 22,076	2–3
6	May 19	Detroit	L 79–88	Reggie Miller (27)	Jermaine O'Neal (11)	Jamaal Tinsley (10)	Conseco Fieldhouse; 18,345	2–4

2005 schedule

== Player statistics ==
=== Regular season ===
Player	POS	GP	GS	MP	REB	AST	STL	BLK	PTS	MPG	RPG	APG	SPG	BPG	PPG
Fred Jones	SG	77	14	2,268	242	196	61	31	813	29.5	3.1	2.5	.8	.4	10.6
James Jones	SF	75	24	1,330	174	57	31	28	371	17.7	2.3	.8	.4	.4	4.9
Austin Croshere	PF	73	22	1,827	375	98	48	17	647	25.0	5.1	1.3	.7	.2	8.9
Eddie Gill	PG	73	3	1,021	112	83	59	5	269	14.0	1.5	1.1	.8	.1	3.7
Reggie Miller	SG	66	66	2,105	156	146	50	5	974	31.9	2.4	2.2	.8	.1	14.8
Anthony Johnson	PG	63	36	1,747	179	302	59	15	532	27.7	2.8	4.8	.9	.2	8.4
Jeff Foster	C	61	43	1,594	550	43	46	12	426	26.1	9.0	.7	.8	.2	7.0
Stephen Jackson	SF	51	49	1,806	250	119	64	14	953	35.4	4.9	2.3	1.3	.3	18.7
Scot Pollard	C	49	17	865	205	18	30	24	191	17.7	4.2	.4	.6	.5	3.9
Jermaine O'Neal	PF	44	41	1,530	388	82	25	88	1,068	34.8	8.8	1.9	.6	2.0	24.3
David Harrison	C	43	14	760	135	13	16	55	264	17.7	3.1	.3	.4	1.3	6.1
Jamaal Tinsley	PG	40	40	1,301	160	257	81	12	616	32.5	4.0	6.4	2.0	.3	15.4
Dale Davis^{†}	C	25	25	730	222	24	19	33	172	29.2	8.9	1.0	.8	1.3	6.9
John Edwards	C	25	1	139	19	3	3	4	29	5.6	.8	.1	.1	.2	1.2
Michael Curry	SF	18	7	249	27	15	5	4	30	13.8	1.5	.8	.3	.2	1.7
Marcus Haislip	PF	9	0	106	15	3	2	2	32	11.8	1.7	.3	.2	.2	3.6
Tremaine Fowlkes	SF	8	0	56	8	0	2	0	19	7.0	1.0	.0	.3	.0	2.4
Ron Artest	SF	7	7	291	45	22	12	6	172	41.6	6.4	3.1	1.7	.9	24.6
Jonathan Bender	SF	7	0	93	14	4	1	2	36	13.3	2.0	.6	.1	.3	5.1
Britton Johnsen	SF	6	1	87	10	4	1	0	12	14.5	1.7	.7	.2	.0	2.0

- ^{†} Denotes player spent time with another team in the season. Stats reflect time with the Pacers only.

=== Playoffs ===
Player	POS	GP	GS	MP	REB	AST	STL	BLK	PTS	MPG	RPG	APG	SPG	BPG	PPG
Jermaine O'Neal	PF	13	13	476	104	29	7	34	208	36.6	8.0	2.2	.5	2.6	16.0
Stephen Jackson	SF	13	13	472	50	29	25	6	209	36.3	3.8	2.2	1.9	.5	16.1
Reggie Miller	SG	13	13	430	40	20	10	1	193	33.1	3.1	1.5	.8	.1	14.8
Dale Davis	C	13	13	311	81	5	9	6	69	23.9	6.2	.4	.7	.5	5.3
Anthony Johnson	PG	13	4	316	38	66	13	5	91	24.3	2.9	5.1	1.0	.4	7.0
Jeff Foster	C	13	0	245	96	5	6	12	77	18.8	7.4	.4	.5	.9	5.9
Fred Jones	SG	13	0	234	23	13	8	2	53	18.0	1.8	1.0	.6	.2	4.1
James Jones	SF	13	0	214	27	10	7	7	52	16.5	2.1	.8	.5	.5	4.0
Austin Croshere	PF	10	0	88	17	0	4	1	25	8.8	1.7	.0	.4	.1	2.5
Jamaal Tinsley	PG	9	9	247	30	51	14	3	78	27.4	3.3	5.7	1.6	.3	8.7
Scot Pollard	C	9	0	67	11	1	1	0	13	7.4	1.2	.1	.1	.0	1.4
Eddie Gill	PG	7	0	45	4	5	1	0	24	6.4	.6	.7	.1	.0	3.4

== Awards and records ==
- Jermaine O'Neal, NBA All-Star Game

=== Additions ===
Player	Acquired	Former team	Position
Michael Curry	Signed as free agent	Toronto Raptors	SG
Dale Davis	Signed as free agent	Golden State Warriors	C
John Edwards	Signed as free agent	rookie	C
Tremaine Fowlkes	Signed as free agent	Detroit Pistons	SF
Eddie Gill	Signed as free agent	Portland Trail Blazers	PG
Marcus Haislip	Signed as free agent	Milwaukee Bucks	PF
David Harrison	Draft selection	rookie	C
Stephen Jackson	Trade	Atlanta Hawks	SF
Britton Johnsen	Signed as free agent	Orlando Magic	SF

=== Subtractions ===
Player	Departed	New team	Position
Kenny Anderson	Signed as free agent	Atlanta Hawks	PG
Jamison Brewer	Signed as free agent	New York Knicks	PG
Primož Brezec	Expansion draft	Charlotte Bobcats	C
Al Harrington	Trade	Atlanta Hawks	PF

- An NBA team is normally not allowed to carry more than 12 active players and three inactive players on its roster at any time during the season, but the Pacers were granted an exception to this rule by the NBA due to the Pacers' unusually high number of injured and suspended players.
