= Predrag Drobnjak =

Montenegrin basketball player and scout

Sacramento Kings
- Title: International Scout
- League: NBA

Personal information
- Born: October 27, 1975 (age 51) Bijelo Polje, SR Montenegro, Yugoslavia
- Listed height: 2.11 m (6 ft 11 in)
- Listed weight: 132 kg (291 lb)

Career information
- NBA draft: 1997: 2nd round, 48th overall pick
- Drafted by: Washington Wizards
- Playing career: 1992–2011
- Position: Power forward / center
- Number: 14

Career history
- 1992–1998: Partizan
- 1998–2001: Anadolu Efes
- 2001–2003: Seattle SuperSonics
- 2003–2004: Los Angeles Clippers
- 2004–2005: Atlanta Hawks
- 2005–2006: Baskonia
- 2006–2007: Partizan
- 2007: Girona
- 2007–2008: Beşiktaş
- 2008–2009: Efes Pilsen
- 2009–2010: PAOK
- 2011: Iraklis

Career highlights
- 2× FIBA EuroStar (1996, 1997); Spanish Cup winner (2006); 2× Turkish President's Cup winner (1998, 2000); 2× Turkish Cup winner (2001, 2009); 3× Yugoslavian League champion (1995–1997); 2× Yugoslavian Cup winner (1994, 1995); ABA League champion (2007); Serbian League champion (2007)
- Stats at NBA.com
- Stats at Basketball Reference
Medals
Men's basketball
Representing FR Yugoslavia
FIBA World Cup
Gold medal – first place	1998 Greece	Team
Gold medal – first place	2002 United States	Team
FIBA Eurobasket
Gold medal – first place	2001 Turkey	Team
European Championship for Men '22 and Under'
Bronze medal – third place	1996 Turkey	Team

Predrag "Peđa" Drobnjak (Serbian Cyrillic: Предраг "Пеђа" Дробњак; born 27 October 1975) is a Montenegrin professional basketball scout and former player. At 2.11 m (6 ft 11 in), he played at the power forward and center positions. Throughout his nineteen-year career, Drobnjak has spent three full seasons playing in the NBA.

== Professional career ==
=== Europe ===
Drobnjak started his professional career with Partizan in the 1992–93 season. He played six seasons for Partizan, winning three national titles in a row (1995, 1996 and 1997). In his last year with the club, Drobnjak played in the EuroLeague Final Four, where they finished fourth, after losing in the semifinals to Kinder Bologna, and in the third-place game against Benetton Treviso.

Before the 1998–99 season, Drobnjak signed with Efes Pilsen, in Turkey. Drobnjak stayed for the next three seasons with Efes.

=== NBA ===
Drobnjak was a second-round draft choice of the Washington Wizards in the 1997 NBA draft. During his time in the NBA, Drobnjak played two seasons for the Seattle SuperSonics, one season for the Los Angeles Clippers, and one season for the Atlanta Hawks. In 2004, the Clippers made him available for selection by the Charlotte Bobcats in the expansion draft. After his selection by the Bobcats, Drobnjak was subsequently traded to the Atlanta Hawks in exchange for a 2005 second-round draft pick before playing a game for Charlotte.

=== Return to Europe ===
In July 2005, Drobnjak signed a three-year contract with Tau Cerámica in Spain. However, he was released after only a year, which followed by his signing a one-year contract with his former team Partizan.

In July 2007, he signed with Akasvayu Girona. In December 2007, he left Girona and signed with Beşiktaş Cola Turka for the rest of the season. In November 2008, Drobnjak returned to Efes Pilsen for the 2008–09 season. In the 2009–10 season, Drobnjak played in the Greek Basket League with PAOK. In February 2011, he signed with Iraklis until the end of the season. However, he decided to retire later that month.

== National team career ==
Drobnjak won gold medals at both the 1998 and 2002 FIBA World Championships, and he also won a gold medal at the EuroBasket 2001, while playing with the senior Yugoslav national team.

== Post-playing career ==
In 2015, Drobnjak was named a scout for the Sacramento Kings. at the moment, he lives in Belgrade, Serbia and he is active in popular podcast "NBA bounce" being a coauthor with Luka Spasovski.

== NBA career statistics ==
Legend
GP	Games played	GS	Games started	MPG	Minutes per game
FG%	Field goal percentage	3P%	3-point field goal percentage	FT%	Free throw percentage
RPG	Rebounds per game	APG	Assists per game	SPG	Steals per game
BPG	Blocks per game	PPG	Points per game	**Bold**	Career high

=== Regular season ===
Year	Team	GP	GS	MPG	FG%	3P%	FT%	RPG	APG	SPG	BPG	PPG
2001–02	Seattle	64	12	18.3	**.461**	.000	.753	3.4	.8	.3	**.5**	6.8
2002–03	Seattle	**82**	**69**	**24.2**	.412	**.353**	.791	**3.9**	**1.0**	**.6**	**.5**	**9.4**
2003–04	L.A. Clippers	61	14	15.6	.393	.306	**.849**	3.2	.6	.4	.4	6.3
2004–05	Atlanta	71	1	20.2	.438	.352	.800	3.4	.7	**.6**	.3	8.4
Career		278	96	19.9	.425	.340	.799	3.5	.8	.5	.4	7.9

=== Playoffs ===
Year	Team	GP	GS	MPG	FG%	3P%	FT%	RPG	APG	SPG	BPG	PPG
2002	Seattle	3	1	12.7	.333	.000	.500	2.7	.7	.3	.0	3.3

== See also ==
- List of European basketball players in the United States
- List of Montenegrin NBA players
