= 2004–05 Atlanta Hawks season =

NBA professional basketball team season

- Head coach: Mike Woodson
- Owners: Atlanta Spirit LLC
- Arena: Philips Arena

Results
- Record: 13–69 (.159)
- Place: Division: 5th (Southeast); Conference: 15th (Eastern)
- Playoff finish: Did not qualify

Local media
- Television: WUPA; FSN South; Turner South
- Radio: WCNN

The 2004–05 Atlanta Hawks season was the 56th season for the Atlanta Hawks in the National Basketball Association, and their 37th season in Atlanta, Georgia.

== Season summary ==
=== Off-season ===
The Hawks received the sixth overall pick in the 2004 NBA draft, and selected shooting guard Josh Childress out of Stanford University; the team also selected small forward, and high school basketball star Josh Smith with the 17th overall pick. During the off-season, the Hawks acquired All-Star forward Antoine Walker and Tony Delk from the Dallas Mavericks, acquired Al Harrington from the Indiana Pacers, and acquired Predrag Drobnjak from the expansion Charlotte Bobcats. The team also signed free agents Kenny Anderson, and re-signed former Hawks players, Jon Barry and Kevin Willis. The Hawks hired former NBA player Mike Woodson as their new head coach. For the season, the team moved from the defunct Central Division to the new Southeast Division in the Eastern Conference.

For the season, the Hawks slightly updated their white home uniforms and red road uniforms. The team changed the trim colors on their road uniforms from white to red, and added "ATL" wordmark stamps on the back on both of their home and road uniforms. The Hawks also revealed new yellow alternate road uniforms, which featured a V-shaped collar, a black, white and red trim, and the city name "Atlanta" in red letters on the front of their jerseys; the alternate uniforms also featured black side panels with red and white outlines on their jerseys and shorts, and the team's primary logo on both legs of their shorts.

The team's slightly updated home and road uniforms, and new alternate uniforms would all remain in use until 2007.

=== Regular season ===
Under Woodson and despite the addition of Walker, Harrington, Delk, Childress and Smith, the Hawks struggled losing 14 of their first 16 games of the regular season, posting a nine-game losing streak between November and December. In December, the team traded Barry to the Houston Rockets in exchange for Tyronn Lue. The Hawks posted a six-game losing streak between December and January, and later on held a 10–41 record at the All-Star break. At mid-season, the Hawks traded Walker back to his former team, the Boston Celtics, in exchange for former All-Star guard Gary Payton, Tom Gugliotta and Michael Stewart, while Anderson was released to free agency and signed with the Los Angeles Clippers. However, Payton never played for the Hawks, and was released and then re-signed with the Celtics for the remainder of the season. Before the trade, Walker averaged 20.4 points, 9.4 rebounds and 3.7 assists per game in 53 games, while Anderson contributed 5.0 points and 2.5 assists per game in 39 games before being released.

The Hawks continued to struggle posting a dreadful 13-game losing streak between February and March, and then posting a dreadful 14-game losing streak between March and April. The team lost eleven of their twelve games in February, and lost 15 of their 16 games in March. The Hawks lost 32 of their final 35 games of the season, and finished in last place in the Southeast Division with a league-worst 13–69 record, which was .159 in winning percentage. It was the team's worst record in franchise history, as they missed the NBA playoffs for the sixth consecutive year.

Harrington averaged 17.5 points, 7.0 rebounds and 1.3 steals per game, while Lue averaged 13.5 points and 5.4 assists per game in 49 games after the trade, and Delk contributed 11.9 points per game. In addition, Childress provided the team with 10.1 points and 6.0 rebounds per game, while Smith provided with 9.7 points, 6.2 rebounds and 1.9 blocks per game; Childress and Smith were both named to the NBA All-Rookie Second Team. Meanwhile, Drobnjak averaged 8.4 points and 3.4 rebounds per game, Gugliotta averaged 7.9 points and 5.5 rebounds per game in 27 games, and Jason Collier contributed 5.7 points and 2.6 rebounds per game. Obinna Ekezie provided with 5.5 points and 4.3 rebounds per game in 42 games, and second-year guard Boris Diaw contributed 4.8 points per game.

During the NBA All-Star weekend at the Pepsi Center in Denver, Colorado, Smith won the NBA Slam Dunk Contest. In addition, Smith was also selected for the NBA Rookie Challenge Game, as a member of the Rookies team. The Hawks finished 29th in the NBA in home-game attendance, with an attendance of 586,390 at the Philips Arena during the regular season, which was the second-lowest in the league.

=== Aftermath ===
Following the season, Diaw was traded to the Phoenix Suns, while Drobnjak, Ekezie and Stewart were all released to free agency, and Gugliotta and Willis both retired. However, Willis would later on make a brief comeback with the Dallas Mavericks during the 2006–07 season before retiring again.

== Offseason ==
=== Draft picks ===
Round	Pick	Player	Position	Nationality	College
1	6	Josh Childress	SF/SG	United States	Stanford
1	17	Josh Smith	SF	United States	
2	34	Donta Smith	SG	United States	Southeastern Illinois
2	37	Royal Ivey	PG	United States	Texas
2	42	Viktor Sanikidze	F	Georgia	

== Roster ==
Atlanta Hawks roster
Players

Pos.	No.	Player	Height	Weight	DOB	From
SF	1	Josh Childress	6 ft 8 in (2.03 m)	210 lb (95 kg)		Stanford
C	40	Jason Collier	7 ft 0 in (2.13 m)	260 lb (118 kg)		Georgia Tech
PG	00	Tony Delk	6 ft 1 in (1.85 m)	189 lb (86 kg)		Kentucky
SG	13	Boris Diaw	6 ft 8 in (2.03 m)	215 lb (98 kg)		INSEP
C	14	Predrag Drobnjak	6 ft 11 in (2.11 m)	270 lb (122 kg)		Serbia and Montenegro
PF	54	Obinna Ekezie	6 ft 9 in (2.06 m)	270 lb (122 kg)		Maryland
PF	7	Tom Gugliotta	6 ft 10 in (2.08 m)	240 lb (109 kg)		NC State
PF	3	Al Harrington	6 ft 9 in (2.06 m)	245 lb (111 kg)		St. Patrick (HS)
PG	36	Royal Ivey	6 ft 4 in (1.93 m)	215 lb (98 kg)		Texas
PG	10	Tyronn Lue	6 ft 0 in (1.83 m)	175 lb (79 kg)		Nebraska
SG	15	Donta Smith	6 ft 7 in (2.01 m)	215 lb (98 kg)		Southeastern Illinois
SF	5	Josh Smith	6 ft 9 in (2.06 m)	225 lb (102 kg)		Oak Hill Academy (HS)
C	44	Michael Stewart	6 ft 10 in (2.08 m)	230 lb (104 kg)		California
PF	0	James Thomas	6 ft 8 in (2.03 m)	235 lb (107 kg)		Texas
PF	42	Kevin Willis	7 ft 0 in (2.13 m)	220 lb (100 kg)		Michigan State

Coaches
Head coach
- Mike Woodson (Indiana)

Legend
- (DP) Unsigned draft pick
- (FA) Free agent
- (S) Suspended
- Injured

Roster

== Regular season ==
=== Season standings ===
Southeast Division	W	L	PCT	GB	Home	Road	Div
y-Miami Heat	59	23	.720	–	35–6	24–17	15–1
x-Washington Wizards	45	37	.549	14	29–12	16–25	10–6
e-Orlando Magic	36	46	.439	23	24–17	12–29	6–10
e-Charlotte Bobcats	18	64	.220	41	14–27	4–37	7–9
e-Atlanta Hawks	13	69	.159	46	9–32	4–37	2–14

Eastern Conference
#	Team	W	L	PCT	GB
1	c-Miami Heat	59	23	.720	–
2	y-Detroit Pistons	54	28	.659	5
3	y-Boston Celtics	45	37	.549	14
4	x-Chicago Bulls	47	35	.573	12
5	x-Washington Wizards	45	37	.549	14
6	x-Indiana Pacers	44	38	.537	15
7	x-Philadelphia 76ers	43	39	.524	16
8	x-New Jersey Nets	42	40	.512	17
9	e-Cleveland Cavaliers	42	40	.512	17
10	e-Orlando Magic	36	46	.439	23
11	e-New York Knicks	33	49	.402	26
12	e-Toronto Raptors	33	49	.402	26
13	e-Milwaukee Bucks	30	52	.366	29
14	e-Charlotte Bobcats	18	64	.220	41
15	e-Atlanta Hawks	13	69	.159	46

z - clinched division title
y - clinched division title
x - clinched playoff spot

== Player statistics ==
Legend
GP	Games played	GS	Games started	MPG	Minutes per game
FG%	Field-goal percentage	3P%	3-point field-goal percentage	FT%	Free-throw percentage
RPG	Rebounds per game	APG	Assists per game	SPG	Steals per game
BPG	Blocks per game	PPG	Points per game

=== Season ===
Player	GP	GS	MPG	FG%	3P%	FT%	RPG	APG	SPG	BPG	PPG
Antoine Walker	53	53	40.2	41.5	31.7	53.4	9.4	3.7	1.2	0.6	20.4
Al Harrington	66	66	38.6	45.9	21.6	67.2	7.0	3.2	1.3	0.2	17.5
Tyronn Lue	49	46	31.2	46.4	36.4	87.1	2.2	5.4	0.5	0.0	13.5
Tony Delk	56	1	23.9	41.6	35.6	75.7	2.3	1.9	0.8	0.1	11.9
Josh Childress	80	44	29.7	47.0	23.2	82.3	6.0	1.9	0.9	0.4	10.1
Josh Smith	74	59	27.7	45.5	17.4	68.8	6.2	1.7	0.8	1.9	9.7
Predrag Drobnjak	71	1	20.2	43.8	35.2	80.0	3.4	0.7	0.6	0.3	8.4
Tom Gugliotta	27	9	27.7	43.1	30.8	78.4	5.5	2.1	1.2	0.5	7.9
Jason Collier	70	44	13.5	46.3	42.9	67.6	2.6	0.3	0.2	0.2	5.7
Obinna Ekezie	42	31	17.4	43.4	0.0	77.4	4.3	0.3	0.5	0.3	5.5
Jon Barry	16	0	17.2	40.3	34.4	76.9	1.3	1.8	0.9	0.1	5.2
Kenny Anderson	39	20	18.4	42.6	46.2	73.0	2.1	2.5	0.8	0.0	5.0
Boris Diaw	66	25	18.2	42.2	18.0	74.0	2.6	2.3	0.6	0.3	4.8
Royal Ivey	62	5	13.0	42.9	33.3	70.1	1.4	1.7	0.6	0.1	3.5
Donta Smith	38	0	11.4	38.9	27.3	68.8	1.4	1.0	0.6	0.1	3.3
Kevin Willis	29	5	11.9	38.9	0.0	73.9	2.6	0.3	0.3	0.2	3.0
Michael Stewart	12	1	12.1	52.4	0.0	42.9	3.3	0.4	0.5	0.4	2.1
Anthony Miller	2	0	4.5	66.7	0.0	0.0	0.5	0.5	0.5	0.0	2.0
Jelani McCoy	10	0	8.8	53.8	0.0	20.0	2.1	0.0	0.3	0.8	1.5
James Thomas	2	0	2.5	50.0	0.0	0.0	1.0	0.0	0.0	0.0	1.0

Player statistics citation:

== Awards and records ==
- Josh Smith, NBA All-Rookie Team 2nd Team
- Josh Childress, NBA All-Rookie Team 2nd Team

== Injuries ==
Player	Duration		Injury type	Games missed
Player	Start	End	Injury type	Games missed
Chris Crawford	October 16, 2004	TBD	Torn ACL, sprained MCL, torn cartilage in right knee	Season
Donta Smith	November 1, 2004	November 26, 2004	Strained lower back	11
Tony Delk	November 1, 2004	November 19, 2004	Sore right knee	8
Jason Collier	November 5, 2004	November 7, 2004	Bronchitis	2
Kevin Willis	November 19, 2004	November 30, 2004	Strained right shoulder	5
Predrag Drobnjak	November 24, 2004	December 3, 2004	Sprained right ankle	4
Royal Ivey	November 24, 2004	December 14, 2004	Sprained MCL	10
Donta Smith	November 30, 2004	January 6, 2005	Sore lower back	18
Kevin Willis	December 18, 2004	December 21, 2004	Flu	1
Tony Delk	January 6, 2005	January 19, 2005	Sprained left ankle	5
Kevin Willis	January 10, 2005	January 24, 2005	Strained lower back	7
Royal Ivey	January 19, 2005	January 29, 2005	Right knee tendinitis	6
Obinna Ekezie	January 22, 2005	January 24, 2005	Flu	1
Donta Smith	January 24, 2005	February 2, 2005	Knee tendinitis	5
Jason Collier	January 29, 2005	January 30, 2005	Illness	1
Kenny Anderson	January 29, 2005	February 7, 2005	Strained left calf	4
Predrag Drobnjak	January 29, 2005	January 30, 2005	Sprained left ankle	1
Josh Smith	February 2, 2005	February 12, 2005	Sprained right ankle	5
Tyronn Lue	February 5, 2005	February 22, 2005	Strained left Achilles	6
Al Harrington	February 7, 2005	February 22, 2005	Left knee tendinitis	6
Predrag Drobnjak	February 10, 2005	February 22, 2005	Sprained left ankle	4
Kenny Anderson	February 12, 2005	March 2, 2005	Strained left hamstring	5
Kevin Willis	February 15, 2005	March 5, 2005	Strained lower back	9
Donta Smith	February 24, 2005	March 8, 2005	Left knee tendinitis	5
Tony Delk	February 24, 2005	March 14, 2005	Bruised left hand	9
Royal Ivey	March 2, 2005	March 5, 2005	Mild concussion	1
Kevin Willis	March 8, 2005	April 16, 2005	Strained lower back	20
Michael Stewart	March 14, 2005	April 7, 2005	Back spasms	12
Predrag Drobnjak	March 14, 2005	March 16, 2005	Flu	1
Al Harrington	March 18, 2005	March 21, 2005	Sore back	1
Josh Childress	March 18, 2005	March 21, 2005	Flu	1
Al Harrington	March 28, 2005	March 30, 2005	Right knee tendinitis	1
Tyronn Lue	April 1, 2005	April 2, 2005	Headache	1
Al Harrington	April 5, 2005	TBD	Right knee tendinitis	9
Obinna Ekezie	April 8, 2005	TBD	Left shoulder sprain	8
Tom Gugliotta	April 8, 2005	April 9, 2005	Pulled groin	1
James Thomas	April 16, 2005	TBD	Back spasms	4
Kevin Willis	April 17, 2005	April 19, 2005	Plantar fasciitis left foot	1
Tony Delk	April 17, 2005	April 19, 2005	Sore right knee	1

== Transactions ==
=== Trades ===
June 24, 2004	To Atlanta Hawks 2005 second-round pick (Cenk Akyol); Cash considerations	To San Antonio Spurs Draft rights to 42nd pick Viktor Sanikidze
July 15, 2004	To Atlanta Hawks Al Harrington	To Indiana Pacers Stephen Jackson (sign and trade)
August 4, 2004	To Atlanta Hawks Tony Delk; Antoine Walker	To Dallas Mavericks Jason Terry; Alan Henderson; Cash considerations
August 16, 2004	To Atlanta Hawks 2005 second-round pick (Ronny Turiaf)	To Charlotte Bobcats Predrag Drobnjak
December 23, 2004	To Atlanta Hawks Tyronn Lue	To Houston Rockets Jon Barry
February 24, 2005	To Atlanta Hawks Tom Gugliotta; Gary Payton; Michael Stewart; 2006 first-round pick (Rajon Rondo)	To Boston Celtics Antoine Walker

=== Free agents ===
==== Re-signed ====
Player	Signed	Contract
Jason Collier	July 14, 2004	2 Year, $3.2 Million
Stephen Jackson	July 15, 2004	6 Year, $40 Million

==== Additions ====
Player	Signed	Former team	Contract
Josh Childress	July 12, 2004	Stanford Cardinal (DP)	3 Year, $8 Million
Josh Smith	July 12, 2004	Oak Hill Academy Warriors (DP)	3 Year, $4 Million
Jon Barry	September 16, 2004	Denver Nuggets	N/A
Kenny Anderson	September 16, 2004	Indiana Pacers	N/A
Kevin Willis	September 22, 2004	San Antonio Spurs	N/A
Donta Smith	October 3, 2004	Southeastern Illinois Falcons (DP)	2 Year, $1.2 Million
Reggie Butler *	October 3, 2004	Xavier Musketeers	Training Camp
Royal Ivey	October 3, 2004	Texas Longhorns (DP)	N/A
Saddi Washington *	October 3, 2004	Western Michigan Broncos	Training Camp
Jeff Myers *	October 4, 2004	Drexel Dragons	Training Camp
Lonny Baxter *	October 4, 2004	Charlotte Bobcats	Training Camp
Anthony Miller	October 5, 2004	Houston Rockets	N/A
Donnell Harvey *	October 22, 2004	Phoenix Suns	N/A
Jelani McCoy	November 8, 2004	Milwaukee Bucks	N/A
Obinna Ekezie	January 10, 2005	Columbus Riverdragons (NBDL)	10 Day
Obinna Ekezie	January 20, 2005	Atlanta Hawks	10 Day
Obinna Ekezie	January 31, 2005	Atlanta Hawks	Rest of season
James Thomas	April 9, 2005	Portland Trail Blazers	N/A

* = Cut before regular season

==== Subtractions ====
Player	Reason left	Date	New team
Mamadou N'Diaye	Free Agent	July 1, 2004	Los Angeles Clippers
Jacque Vaughn	Free Agent	July 29, 2004	New Jersey Nets
Michael Bradley	Free Agent	July 29, 2004	Orlando Magic
Travis Hansen	Free Agent	August 2, 2004	(Spain) TAU Cerámica
Bob Sura	Free Agent	August 9, 2004	Houston Rockets
Wesley Person	Free Agent	August 11, 2004	Miami Heat
Joel Przybilla	Free Agent	August 25, 2004	Portland Trail Blazers
Jeff Myers	Waived	October 22, 2004	
Reggie Butler	Waived	October 22, 2004	
Saddi Washington	Waived	October 22, 2004	
Donnell Harvey	Waived	October 28, 2004	New Jersey Nets
Lonny Baxter	Waived	October 28, 2004	New Orleans Hornets
Anthony Miller	Waived	November 8, 2004	retired
Jelani McCoy	Waived	December 14, 2004	Long Beach Jam (ABA)
Chris Crawford	Waived	February 24, 2005	retired
Gary Payton	Waived	March 1, 2005	Boston Celtics

Player transactions citation:

== See also ==
- 2004-05 NBA season
