= Ronald Dupree =

American basketball player (born 1981)

Personal information
- Born: January 26, 1981 (age 45) Biloxi, Mississippi, U.S.
- Listed height: 6 ft 7 in (2.01 m)
- Listed weight: 210 lb (95 kg)

Career information
- High school: Biloxi (Biloxi, Mississippi)
- College: LSU (1999–2003)
- NBA draft: 2003: undrafted
- Playing career: 2003–2014
- Position: Small forward
- Number: 8, 12, 20, 21
- Coaching career: 2016–2017

Career history

Playing
- 2003–2004: Huntsville Flight
- 2004: Chicago Bulls
- 2004–2005: Detroit Pistons
- 2005–2006: Minnesota Timberwolves
- 2006–2007: Detroit Pistons
- 2007–2009: Tulsa 66ers
- 2008: Seattle SuperSonics
- 2009: Utah Flash
- 2009–2010: Telekom Baskets Bonn
- 2010–2011: Toronto Raptors
- 2011: Utah Flash
- 2012: Regatas Corrientes
- 2012: Andrea Costa Imola
- 2013: Los Angeles D-Fenders
- 2013: Reno Bighorns
- 2013–2014: Hapoel Jerusalem

Career highlights
- NBA D-League All-Star (2009); All-NBA D-League Third Team (2009); NBA D-League All-Defensive Second Team (2011); 2x Second-team All-SEC (2002, 2003); Third-team All-SEC (2001)

Career statistics
- Points: 555 (3.5 ppg)
- Rebounds: 339 (2.2 rpg)
- Assists: 100 (0.6 apg)
- Stats at NBA.com
- Stats at Basketball Reference

Ronald Edmund Dupree Jr. (born January 26, 1981) is an American former professional basketball player who played six seasons in the National Basketball Association (NBA). He also played numerous seasons in the NBA Development League, and spent time in Europe and Argentina. After his playing retirement, Dupree was a college basketball assistant coach and works as a scout for the Milwaukee Bucks.

== College career ==
Dupree played at Louisiana State University (LSU) under Coach John Brady. He averaged 4.9 points and 3.3 rebounds in 12.7 minutes per game in the Tigers' 2000 Sweet Sixteen season. He was named All-SEC Second Team in his sophomore, junior, and senior seasons. During his sophomore season he led the SEC in scoring at 17.3 points per game and was second in rebounding with 8.8 per game. In each of his last three years he ranked second in the SEC in rebounding with averages of 8.8 (2000–2001), 8.5 (2001–2002), and 8.3 (2002–2003). He also never finished lower than seventh in the league in scoring in his final three seasons. He finished his LSU career as the school's eighth-most-prolific scorer and sixth-best rebounder.

== Professional career ==
Dupree went undrafted in 2003, but signed during the 2003–04 season with the Chicago Bulls. After his rookie season, he signed a contract with the Detroit Pistons, but was infrequently used by coach Larry Brown. Dupree was traded to the Minnesota Timberwolves prior to the 2005–06 season for a second-round draft pick. He re-signed with the Pistons on July 17, 2006. On December 14, 2007, he was waived so the Pistons could make room for other players obtained in a trade with the Charlotte Bobcats. He was signed to a ten-day contract by the Seattle SuperSonics on April 3, 2008, becoming the last player to sign with the Sonics.

Dupree started the 2008–2009 season with the Tulsa 66ers of the NBA Developmental League. Halfway through the season he was traded to the Utah Flash, and helped take that team to the D-League finals. Dupree was invited to training camp with the Utah Jazz for preparation to the 2009–2010 season. However, he did not make their final roster.

He signed a non-guaranteed contract with the Toronto Raptors on September 16, 2010. Dupree was released from the Toronto Raptors roster on October 19, 2010. He was re-signed by Toronto on December 26, 2010, but waived again on January 5, 2011.

He signed with the Argentine team Regatas Corrientes in January 2012. He then signed with the Italian team Andrea Costa Imola Basket in February 2012. In September 2012, he joined the Memphis Grizzlies, but he did not make the team's regular season roster.

On January 4, 2013, Dupree was acquired by the Los Angeles D-Fenders. On February 25, 2013, Dupree was traded to the Reno Bighorns. On August 8, 2013, he signed a two-year deal with Hapoel Jerusalem.

On September 10, 2014, he announced his retirement and became a student assistant on the LSU men's basketball staff.

== Post-playing career ==
Dupree returned to LSU as a student assistant coach in 2014. He was elevated to the position of director of student development for the 2015–16 season. Dupree was hired by the Nevada Wolf Pack men's basketball team as an assistant coach for the 2016–17 season. He departed the position in 2017 to join the Milwaukee Bucks as a scout. In 2025, Dupree returned to LSU again to take the newly created position of Basketball General Manager.

== NBA career statistics ==
Legend
GP	Games played	GS	Games started	MPG	Minutes per game
FG%	Field goal percentage	3P%	3-point field goal percentage	FT%	Free throw percentage
RPG	Rebounds per game	APG	Assists per game	SPG	Steals per game
BPG	Blocks per game	PPG	Points per game	**Bold**	Career high

=== Regular season ===
Year	Team	GP	GS	MPG	FG%	3P%	FT%	RPG	APG	SPG	BPG	PPG
2003–04	Chicago	**47**	**8**	**19.0**	.394	.444	.629	**3.6**	**1.2**	**.7**	**.4**	**6.2**
2004–05	Detroit	**47**	0	10.0	.480	**.500**	.617	2.0	.5	.1	.2	3.2
2005–06	Minnesota	36	0	7.4	**.524**	.000	.341	1.4	.4	.3	.0	2.2
2006–07	Detroit	19	0	4.9	.355	.000	.333	.9	.3	.3	.1	1.3
2007–08	Detroit	1	0	3.0	.000	.000	.000	.0	.0	.0	.0	.0
2007–08	Seattle	4	0	4.5	.333	.000	**1.000**	2.0	.3	.3	.0	1.0
2010–11	Toronto	3	0	4.3	.250	.000	.000	1.0	.3	.0	.0	0.7
Career		157	8	11.2	.427	.385	.559	2.2	.6	.4	.2	3.5

=== Playoffs ===
Year	Team	GP	GS	MPG	FG%	3P%	FT%	RPG	APG	SPG	BPG	PPG
2005	Detroit	14	0	2.7	.286	.000	.000	.4	.0	.0	.0	.3
Career		14	0	2.7	.286	.000	.000	.4	.0	.0	.0	.3
