= 2004–05 Philadelphia 76ers season =

NBA professional basketball team season

- Head coach: Jim O'Brien
- Arena: Wachovia Center

Results
- Record: 43–39 (.524)
- Place: Division: 2nd (Atlantic); Conference: 7th (Eastern)
- Playoff finish: First Round (lost to Pistons 1–4)
- Stats at Basketball Reference

Local media
- Television: CSN Philadelphia, WPSG
- Radio: WIP, WPHT

The 2004–05 Philadelphia 76ers season was the sixty-sixth season of the franchise and the fifty-sixth in the National Basketball Association (NBA).

== Background ==
During the offseason, the Sixers acquired Corliss Williamson from the Detroit Pistons. Under new head coach Jim O'Brien, the team played mediocre basketball losing twelve of its first eighteen games.

At midseason, the team traded Williamson back to the Sacramento Kings for All-Star forward Chris Webber, and traded Glenn Robinson, who had not played this season due to tendinitis in his left ankle, to the New Orleans Hornets for Jamal Mashburn. Webber struggled to adjust to his new surroundings, however, and Mashburn was already out for the entire season with a knee injury. The team managed to win eight of its final ten games, finishing second in the Atlantic Division with a 43–39 record.

During the first round of the playoffs, the Sixers lost in five games to the defending champion Detroit Pistons. Following the season, O'Brien was fired after one season of coaching, Aaron McKie signed as a free agent with the Los Angeles Lakers, and Mashburn retired.

Allen Iverson won his fourth and final scoring title of his career and was also selected for the 2005 NBA All-Star Game in Denver, after which he was named the game's MVP. Top draft pick Andre Iguodala was chosen for the All-Rookie First Team.

== Key dates ==
- June 24: The 2004 NBA draft took place in New York City.
- July 1: The free agency period started.
- October 12: The Sixers pre-season started with a game against the Washington Wizards.
- November 3: Season Opener against the Boston Celtics.
- May 3: The Sixers were eliminated from the 2005 NBA Playoffs with their game 5 loss to Detroit finishing the series 4–1.

== Draft picks ==
Round	Pick	Player	Position	Nationality	College
1	9	Andre Iguodala	SG/SF	United States	Arizona

== Roster ==
2004–05 Philadelphia 76ers roster
Players

Pos.	No.	Player	Height	Weight	DOB	From
F/C	31	Michael Bradley	6 ft 10 in (2.08 m)	245 lb (111 kg)		Villanova
C	1	Samuel Dalembert	6 ft 11 in (2.11 m)	250 lb (113 kg)		Seton Hall
F	23	Josh Davis	6 ft 8 in (2.03 m)	235 lb (107 kg)		Wyoming
G	33	Willie Green	6 ft 4 in (1.93 m)	200 lb (91 kg)		Detroit Mercy
G/F	4 — 9	Andre Iguodala	6 ft 6 in (1.98 m)	207 lb (94 kg)		Arizona
G	3	Allen Iverson	6 ft 0 in (1.83 m)	165 lb (75 kg)		Georgetown
F/C	25	Marc Jackson	6 ft 10 in (2.08 m)	270 lb (122 kg)		Temple
G/F	26	Kyle Korver	6 ft 7 in (2.01 m)	210 lb (95 kg)		Creighton
F	—	Jamal Mashburn (IN)	6 ft 8 in (2.03 m)	240 lb (109 kg)		Kentucky
G/F	8	Aaron McKie	6 ft 5 in (1.96 m)	209 lb (95 kg)		Temple
G	12	Kevin Ollie	6 ft 4 in (1.93 m)	195 lb (88 kg)		Connecticut
F	54	Rodney Rogers	6 ft 7 in (2.01 m)	235 lb (107 kg)		Wake Forest
G/F	7	John Salmons	6 ft 7 in (2.01 m)	210 lb (95 kg)		Miami (FL)
F/C	4	Chris Webber	6 ft 9 in (2.06 m)	245 lb (111 kg)		Michigan

Coaches
Head coach
- Jim O'Brien (Saint Joseph's)
Assistant(s)
- Lester Conner (Oregon State)
- Joe Gallagher (Pembroke State)
- Dick Harter (Penn)
- Frank Vogel (Kentucky)
- Frank Zanin (West Chester)

Legend
- (DP) Unsigned draft pick
- (FA) Free agent
- (S) Suspended
- Injured

Roster

=== Roster notes ===
- Small Forward Jamal Mashburn was acquired from the New Orleans Hornets at midseason, but did not play for the 76ers due to a knee injury.

== Pre-season ==
2004 pre-season game log
October: 6–2 (home: 4–0; road: 2–2)

Game	Date	Team	Score	High points	High rebounds	High assists	Location Attendance	Record
1	October 12	Washington Wizards	114–107	M. Jackson (21)	K. Thomas, M. Jackson (6)	K. Thomas, G. Robinson (4)	(Durham, North Carolina); 4,725	1–0 recap
2	October 15	@ Toronto Raptors	99–97	A. Iverson (32)	S. Dalembert (11)	A. Iverson (4)	13,370	2–0 recap
3	October 17	Toronto Raptors	108–103	W. Green (16)	M. Jackson (7)	A. Iguodala (5)	(London, Ontario); 7,619	3–0 recap
4	October 19	@ New Orleans Hornets	89–92	A. Iverson (16)	M. Jackson (8)	A. Iguodala (5)	13,196	3–1 recap
5	October 21	@ San Antonio Spurs	97–95 OT	A. Iverson, C. Williamson (14)	N/A	N/A	15,385	4–1 recap
6	October 23	New Jersey Nets	86–81	A. Iverson (27)	A. Iverson, S. Dalembert (7)	A. Iverson (4)	16,568	5–1 recap
7	October 26	Utah Jazz	97–86	A. Iverson (19)	K. Thomas (7)	A. McKie, A. Iverson, A. Iguodala (3)	14,641	6–1 recap
8	October 28	@ New Jersey Nets	94–96	K. Thomas, A. Iguodala (15)	M. Jackson (8)	A. Iverson, W. Green, K. Korver (4)	5,556	6–2 recap

2004–05 season schedule

== Regular season ==
=== Season standings ===
Atlantic Division	W	L	PCT	GB	Home	Road	Div
y-Boston Celtics	45	37	.549	–	27–14	18–23	8–8
x-Philadelphia 76ers	43	39	.524	2	25–16	18–23	8–8
x-New Jersey Nets	42	40	.512	3	24–17	18–23	11–5
e-New York Knicks	33	49	.402	12	22–19	11–30	6–10
e-Toronto Raptors	33	49	.402	12	22–19	11–30	7–9

Eastern Conference
#	Team	W	L	PCT	GB
1	c-Miami Heat	59	23	.720	–
2	y-Detroit Pistons	54	28	.659	5
3	y-Boston Celtics	45	37	.549	14
4	x-Chicago Bulls	47	35	.573	12
5	x-Washington Wizards	45	37	.549	14
6	x-Indiana Pacers	44	38	.537	15
7	x-Philadelphia 76ers	43	39	.524	16
8	x-New Jersey Nets	42	40	.512	17
9	e-Cleveland Cavaliers	42	40	.512	17
10	e-Orlando Magic	36	46	.439	23
11	e-New York Knicks	33	49	.402	26
12	e-Toronto Raptors	33	49	.402	26
13	e-Milwaukee Bucks	30	52	.366	29
14	e-Charlotte Bobcats	18	64	.220	41
15	e-Atlanta Hawks	13	69	.159	46

== Playoffs ==
2005 playoff game log
First Round: 1–4 (home: 1–1; road: 0–3)

Game	Date	Team	Score	High points	High rebounds	High assists	Location Attendance	Series
1	April 23	@ Detroit	L 85–106	Allen Iverson (30)	Samuel Dalembert (18)	Allen Iverson (10)	The Palace of Auburn Hills; 22,076	0–1
2	April 26	@ Detroit	L 84–99	Allen Iverson (19)	Samuel Dalembert (11)	Allen Iverson (10)	The Palace of Auburn Hills; 22,076	0–2
3	April 29	Detroit	W 115–104	Allen Iverson (37)	Samuel Dalembert (10)	Allen Iverson (15)	Wachovia Center; 16,907	1–2
4	May 1	Detroit	L 92–97 (OT)	Allen Iverson (36)	Samuel Dalembert (15)	Allen Iverson (8)	Wachovia Center; 15,894	1–3
5	May 3	@ Detroit	L 78–88	Allen Iverson (34)	Samuel Dalembert (10)	Allen Iverson (7)	The Palace of Auburn Hills; 22,076	1–4

2005 schedule

== Player statistics ==
Legend
GP	Games played	GS	Games started	MPG	Minutes per game
FG%	Field-goal percentage	3P%	3-point field-goal percentage	FT%	Free-throw percentage
RPG	Rebounds per game	APG	Assists per game	SPG	Steals per game
BPG	Blocks per game	PPG	Points per game

=== Season ===
Player	GP	GS	MPG	FG%	3P%	FT%	RPG	APG	SPG	BPG	PPG
Michael Bradley	2	0	8.0	.800	.000	.500	1.5	.5	.00	.00	4.5
Kedrick Brown	8	0	6.9	.333	.000	.800	1.4	.5	.38	.13	1.5
Samuel Dalembert	72	60	24.8	.524	.000	.601	7.5	.5	.64	1.68	8.2
Josh Davis	42	5	7.8	.378	.358	.824	1.9	.3	.19	.10	2.8
Willie Green	57	21	18.7	.366	.286	.776	2.3	1.8	.60	.11	7.7
Andre Iguodala	82	82	32.8	.493	.331	.536	5.7	3.0	1.68	.59	9.0
Allen Iverson	75	75	42.3	.424	.308	.835	4.0	7.9	2.40	.12	30.7
Marc Jackson	81	23	24.4	.465	.000	.828	5.0	1.0	.38	.22	12.0
Kyle Korver	82	57	32.5	.418	.405	.854	4.6	2.2	1.26	.40	11.5
Aaron McKie	68	3	16.4	.430	.323	.625	2.5	1.5	.71	.25	2.2
Kevin Ollie	26	0	6.1	.355	.000	.667	0.7	0.7	.19	.00	1.1
Rodney Rogers	28	7	17.3	.391	.303	.714	3.7	.9	.79	.29	6.0
John Salmons	58	8	17.1	.405	.341	.729	2.1	2.0	.69	.22	4.1
Brian Skinner	24	0	10.3	.386	.000	.294	2.6	0.2	.21	.25	2.0
Kenny Thomas	47	43	28.6	.456	.250	.798	6.6	1.6	.85	.13	11.3
Chris Webber	21	21	33.4	.391	.267	.776	7.9	3.1	1.24	.90	15.6
Corliss Williamson	48	5	22.0	.465	.000	.788	3.7	0.9	.54	.25	10.8

=== Playoffs ===
Player	GP	GS	MPG	FG%	3P%	FT%	RPG	APG	SPG	BPG	PPG
Samuel Dalembert	5	5	38.4	.553		.400	12.8	.4	.4	1.4	11.6
Josh Davis	2	0	2.0	.000	.000		.5	.0	.0	.0	.0
Willie Green	5	0	12.6	.444	.222	.900	1.8	.6	.2	.0	5.4
Andre Iguodala	5	5	38.4	.465	.333	.500	4.6	3.0	2.8	1.0	9.8
Allen Iverson	5	5	47.6	.468	.414	.897	2.2	10.0	2.0	.4	31.2
Marc Jackson	5	0	13.0	.250		.636	1.6	.0	.4	.4	3.4
Kyle Korver	5	5	29.4	.286	.292	1.000	2.6	1.6	.8	.2	5.0
Aaron McKie	5	0	17.0	.429	.333		2.4	1.0	.8	.0	1.4
Rodney Rogers	4	0	12.3	.462	.375	.714	1.0	.3	.0	.5	5.0
John Salmons	2	0	2.0				.0	.5	.0	.0	.0
Chris Webber	5	5	37.2	.411	.357	.750	5.8	2.8	1.2	.2	19.0

== Awards and records ==
- Allen Iverson, All-NBA First Team
- Andre Iguodala, NBA All-Rookie Team 1st Team

== Transactions ==
The 76ers have been involved in the following transactions during the 2004–05 season.

=== Trades ===
July 20, 2004	To Philadelphia 76ers Kedrick Brown; Kevin Ollie To Cleveland Cavaliers Eric Snow
August 4, 2004	To Philadelphia 76ers Corliss Williamson To Detroit Pistons Derrick Coleman; Amal McCaskill
February 23, 2005	To Philadelphia 76ers Matt Barnes; Michael Bradley; Chris Webber To Sacramento Kings Brian Skinner; Kenny Thomas; Corliss Williamson
February 24, 2005	To Philadelphia 76ers Jamal Mashburn; Rodney Rogers To New Orleans Hornets Glenn Robinson
June 7, 2005	To Philadelphia 76ers 2005 2nd-round pick To Utah Jazz 2008 2nd-round pick

=== Free agents ===
Additions
Player	Date signed	Former team
Brian Skinner	July 14	Milwaukee Bucks
Josh Davis	September 20	Baloncesto León (Spain)

Subtractions
Player	Date waived	New Team
Greg Buckner	September 8	Denver Nuggets

== See also ==
- 2004–05 NBA season
