= John Edwards (basketball) =

American basketball player (born 1981)

Personal information
- Born: July 31, 1981 (age 45) Warren, Ohio, U.S.
- Listed height: 7 ft 0 in (2.13 m)
- Listed weight: 275 lb (125 kg)

Career information
- High school: Hudson (Hudson, Ohio)
- College: Kent State (2000–2004)
- NBA draft: 2004: undrafted
- Playing career: 2004–2012
- Position: Center
- Number: 54

Career history
- 2004–2005: Indiana Pacers
- 2005–2006: Atlanta Hawks
- 2006–2007: Albuquerque Thunderbirds
- 2007: Tulsa 66ers
- 2007–2008: BC Cherkasy
- 2009: Sioux Falls Skyforce
- 2009–2010: Iowa Energy
- 2009–2010: Bakersfield Jam
- 2010–2011: Colossus Rhodes
- 2011: Indios de Mayagüez
- 2011–2012: Turów Zgorzelec
- 2012: BC Tsmoki-Minsk

Career highlights
- First-team All-MAC (2004); MAC Defensive Player of the Year (2004)
- Stats at NBA.com
- Stats at Basketball Reference

John Edwards (born July 31, 1981) is an American former professional basketball player. He played the center position.

Edwards played collegiately for Kent State University. While at Kent State, Edwards was part of two of the Golden Flashes trips to the NCAA tournament which included their appearance in the 2002 Elite Eight. He was named Mid-American Conference Defensive Player of the Year and a first-team all-conference pick in his final season and holds the Kent State record for season and career blocked shots.

He was invited to the Indiana Pacers training camp in 2004. Mainly due to his size, and some unexpected injuries to the Pacers big men early in the season, he was the only free agent training camp invitee to earn a spot on the main roster. Even so, he was expected to be released as soon as the Pacers got healthy, but the rash of suspensions resulting from the November 19, 2004, brawl at The Palace of Auburn Hills enabled him to remain on the team. As a result of this and other injuries to the bench, the Pacers were only able to dress six players and Edwards constituted the team's entire bench.

During the summer of 2005, Edwards signed with the Atlanta Hawks, and, during the 2005–06 NBA season, he averaged 8.6 minutes per game.

On August 22, 2006, Edwards was traded back to the Pacers, along with Al Harrington, in exchange for a 2007 first-round draft pick. He was waived in preseason, and split time with two NBDL teams in 2006–07. Edwards signed with the Albuquerque Thunderbirds in December 2006 then with the Tulsa 66ers the following month. The following season, also during preseason, Edwards was waived by the Minnesota Timberwolves, signing in November 2007 with Cherkassy.

Edwards returned to the D-League when he signed with the Iowa Energy in March 2009. The Energy traded Edwards to the Bakersfield Jam in January 2010.

He played in the 2010–2011 season with the Greek League team Colossus Rhodes. He then played in Puerto Rico, before moving to Poland to play for Turów Zgorzelec. In 2012, he signed with BC Tsmoki-Minsk in Belarus. He retired from basketball in 2013 and is pursuing a career in Information Technology.
