= James Thomas (basketball) =

American basketball player and coach (born 1980)

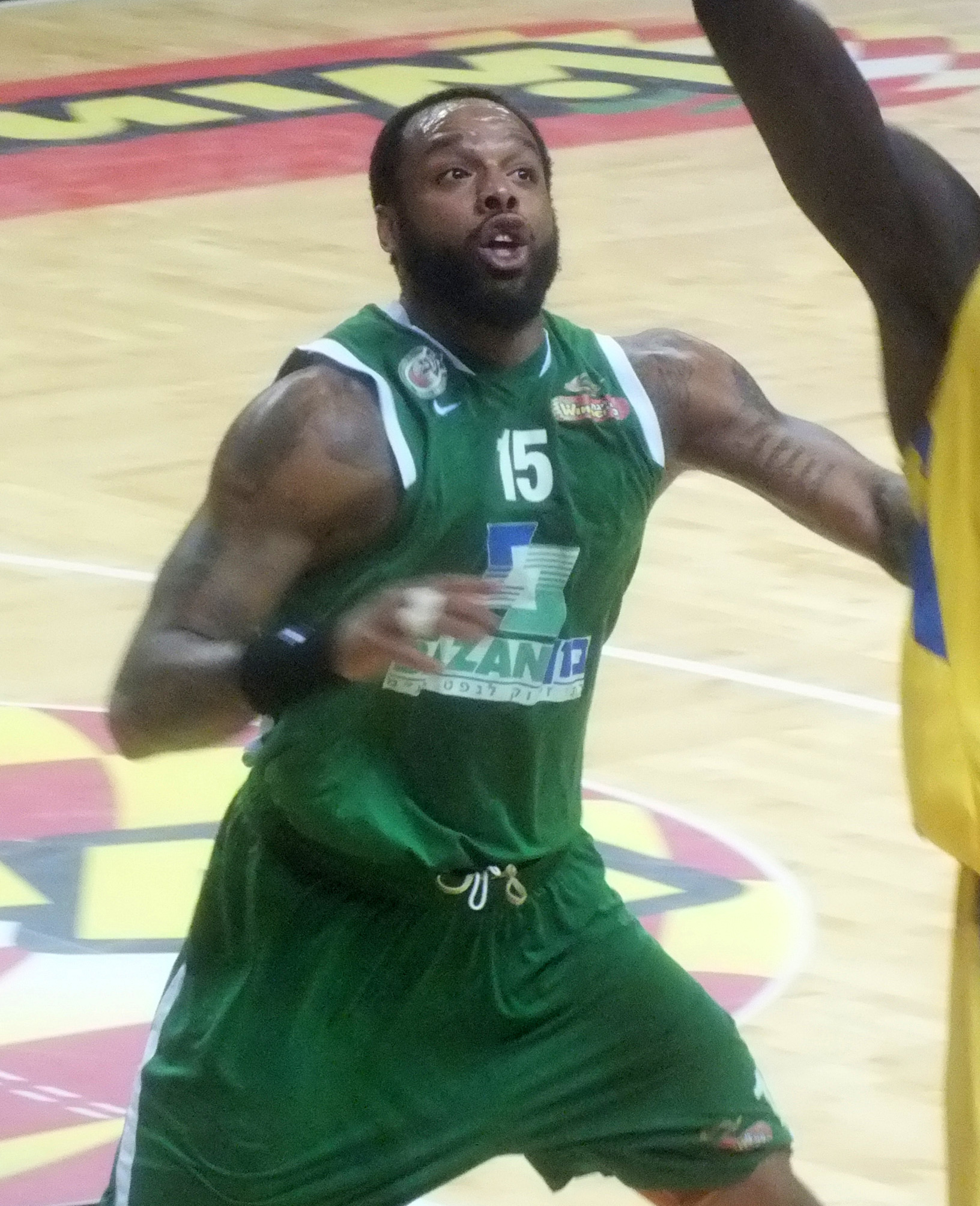
- Thomas with Maccabi Haifa in 2013

Personal information
- Born: November 22, 1980 (age 45) Schenectady, New York, U.S.
- Listed height: 6 ft 8 in (2.03 m)
- Listed weight: 245 lb (111 kg)

Career information
- High school: Hargrave Military Academy (Chatham, Virginia)
- College: Texas (2000–2004)
- NBA draft: 2004: undrafted
- Playing career: 2004–2015
- Position: Power forward
- Number: 12, 6, 30

Career history

Playing
- 2004–2005: Roanoke Dazzle
- 2005: Portland Trail Blazers
- 2005: Atlanta Hawks
- 2005: Philadelphia 76ers
- 2005–2006: Albany Patroons
- 2006: Chicago Bulls
- 2006–2008: Climamio Bologna
- 2008–2009: Erdemirspor
- 2009–2010: Bancatercas Teramo
- 2010–2011: Erdemirspor
- 2011–2012: Givova Scafati
- 2012–2013: Maccabi Haifa
- 2013: Titanes del Licey
- 2013: Soles de Mexicali
- 2013–2014: Maccabi Rishon LeZion
- 2014: Titanes del Licey
- 2014–2015: Academia Montana
- 2015: Marinos de Anzoátegui

Coaching
- 2015–2016: Maine Red Claws (assistant)
- 2017–2019: Schenectady HS (girls)

Career highlights
- NBDL Rookie of the Year (2005); All-NBDL Second Team (2005); All-CBA First Team (2006); CBA All-Defensive First Team (2006); CBA Newcomer of the Year (2006)
- Stats at NBA.com
- Stats at Basketball Reference

James D. Thomas Jr. (born November 22, 1980) is an American former professional basketball player who most recently worked as an assistant coach for the Maine Red Claws of the NBA Development League. A 6'8" forward from the University of Texas at Austin, Thomas was the recipient of the 2004–05 NBA Development League Rookie of the Year. He played in the NBA for the Portland Trail Blazers, Atlanta Hawks, Philadelphia 76ers, and Chicago Bulls. After that he took his career overseas. In 2012, he signed with Maccabi Haifa BC. For the 2013–14 season he signed with Maccabi Rishon LeZion.
