= Al Harrington =

American basketball player and entrepreneur (born 1980)

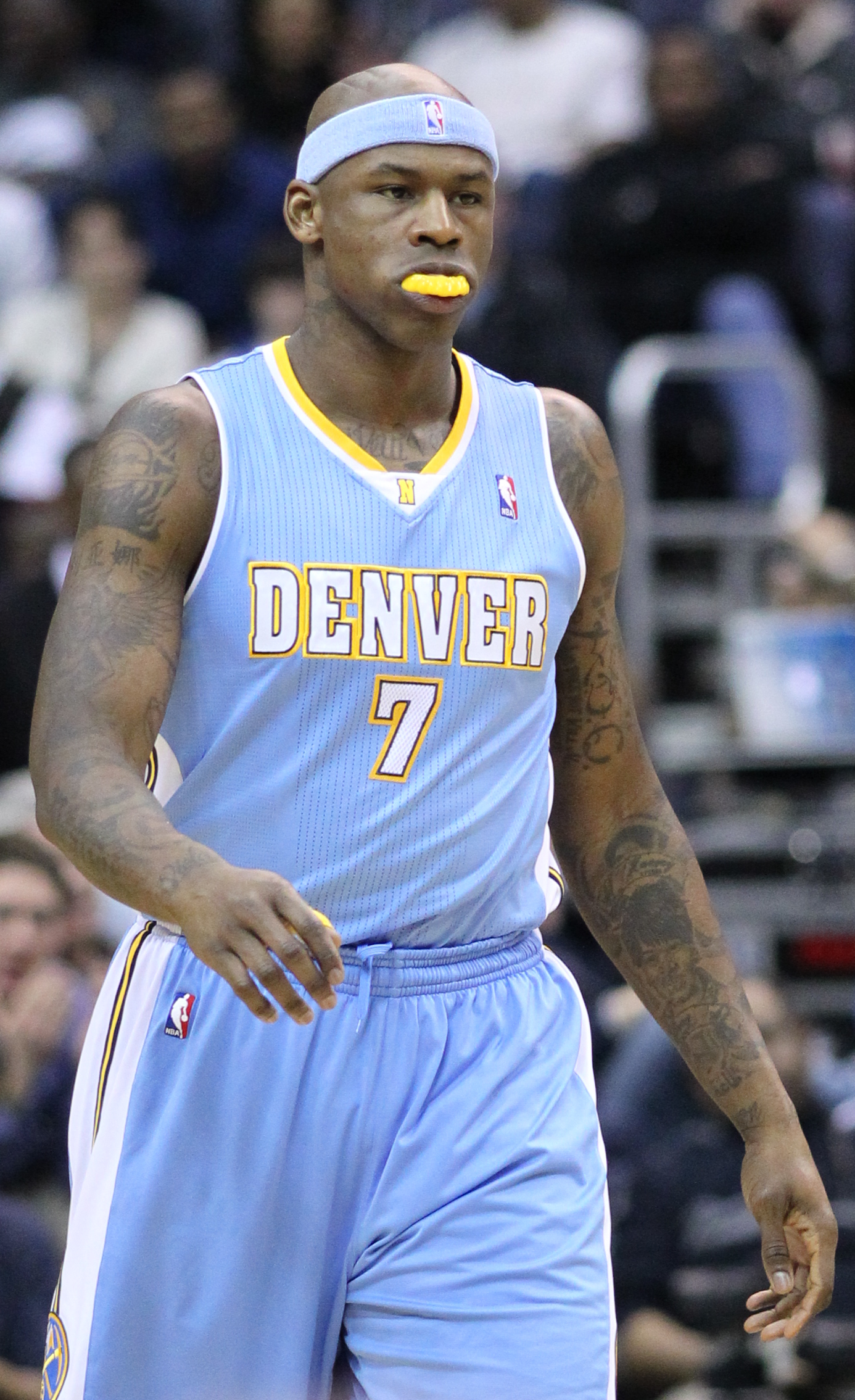
- Harrington with the Denver Nuggets in 2011

Personal information
- Born: February 17, 1980 (age 46) Orange, New Jersey, U.S.
- Listed height: 6 ft 9 in (2.06 m)
- Listed weight: 245 lb (111 kg)

Career information
- High school: St. Patrick (Elizabeth, New Jersey)
- NBA draft: 1998: 1st round, 25th overall pick
- Drafted by: Indiana Pacers
- Playing career: 1998–2015
- Position: Power forward / small forward
- Number: 3, 32, 7

Career history

Playing
- 1998–2004: Indiana Pacers
- 2004–2006: Atlanta Hawks
- 2006–2007: Indiana Pacers
- 2007–2008: Golden State Warriors
- 2008–2010: New York Knicks
- 2010–2012: Denver Nuggets
- 2012–2013: Orlando Magic
- 2013–2014: Washington Wizards
- 2014: Fujian Sturgeons
- 2015: Sydney Kings

Career highlights
- Naismith Prep Player of the Year (1998); USA Today Player of the Year (1998); Gatorade National Player of the Year (1998); First-team Parade All-American (1998); McDonald's All-American (1998)

Career statistics
- Points: 13,237 (13.5 ppg)
- Rebounds: 5,482 (5.6 rpg)
- Assists: 1,649 (1.7 apg)
- Stats at NBA.com
- Stats at Basketball Reference

Albert Harrington (born February 17, 1980) is an American former professional basketball player and cannabis entrepreneur. Selected with the 25th overall pick in the 1998 NBA draft, Harrington played 16 seasons in the National Basketball Association (NBA) for the Indiana Pacers, Atlanta Hawks, Golden State Warriors, New York Knicks, Denver Nuggets, Orlando Magic, and Washington Wizards. He also spent a short stint with the Fujian Sturgeons of the Chinese Basketball Association (CBA).

Since retiring from the NBA, Harrington has become an entrepreneur in the cannabis industry. Harrington is a cousin of former NBA player and Los Angeles Clippers assistant coach Dahntay Jones.

== Early life ==
Born in Orange, New Jersey, Harrington grew up in Roselle, New Jersey and played high school basketball at St. Patrick High School in Elizabeth, New Jersey. He was named both Gatorade and USA Today's National Player of the Year, as well as a 1998 McDonald's High School All-American after his senior season.

== Professional career ==
=== Indiana Pacers (1998–2004) ===
At only 18 years of age, Harrington was selected by the Indiana Pacers with the 25th overall pick in the 1998 NBA draft, making him the first player born in the 1980s to be drafted by the NBA. Harrington spent six seasons with the Pacers, primarily coming off the bench. Harrington really began to come into his own in the 2001–02 season, in which he averaged 13.1 points and 6.3 rebounds per game, but his season came to an end in a game against the Boston Celtics when he suffered a knee injury that forced him to miss the final 38 games of the season.

He made a comeback in the 2002–03 season, becoming the only Pacer to play in all 82 games that year. He averaged 12.2 points and 6.0 rebounds per game while starting in 37 games. The following season, he boosted his averages slightly to 13.3 points and 6.4 rebounds per game, and finished second in voting for the NBA Sixth Man of the Year Award. He was an integral part of the Pacers' first run to the Eastern Conference Finals since 2000.

=== Atlanta Hawks (2004–2006) ===
On July 15, 2004, Harrington was traded to the Atlanta Hawks in exchange for Stephen Jackson. Harrington finally became a nightly starter, but the Hawks did not fare as successfully as the Pacers did after his departure.

=== Second run with Pacers (2006–2007) ===
On August 22, 2006, Harrington and John Edwards were acquired by the Indiana Pacers from the Atlanta Hawks in a sign-and-trade deal that also sent the Hawks a 2007 first-round draft pick. In 2006–07, Harrington wore jersey #32 because his first choice #3 was worn by teammate Šarūnas Jasikevičius (saying it stands for "number three, and it's my second time around").

=== Golden State Warriors (2007–2008) ===
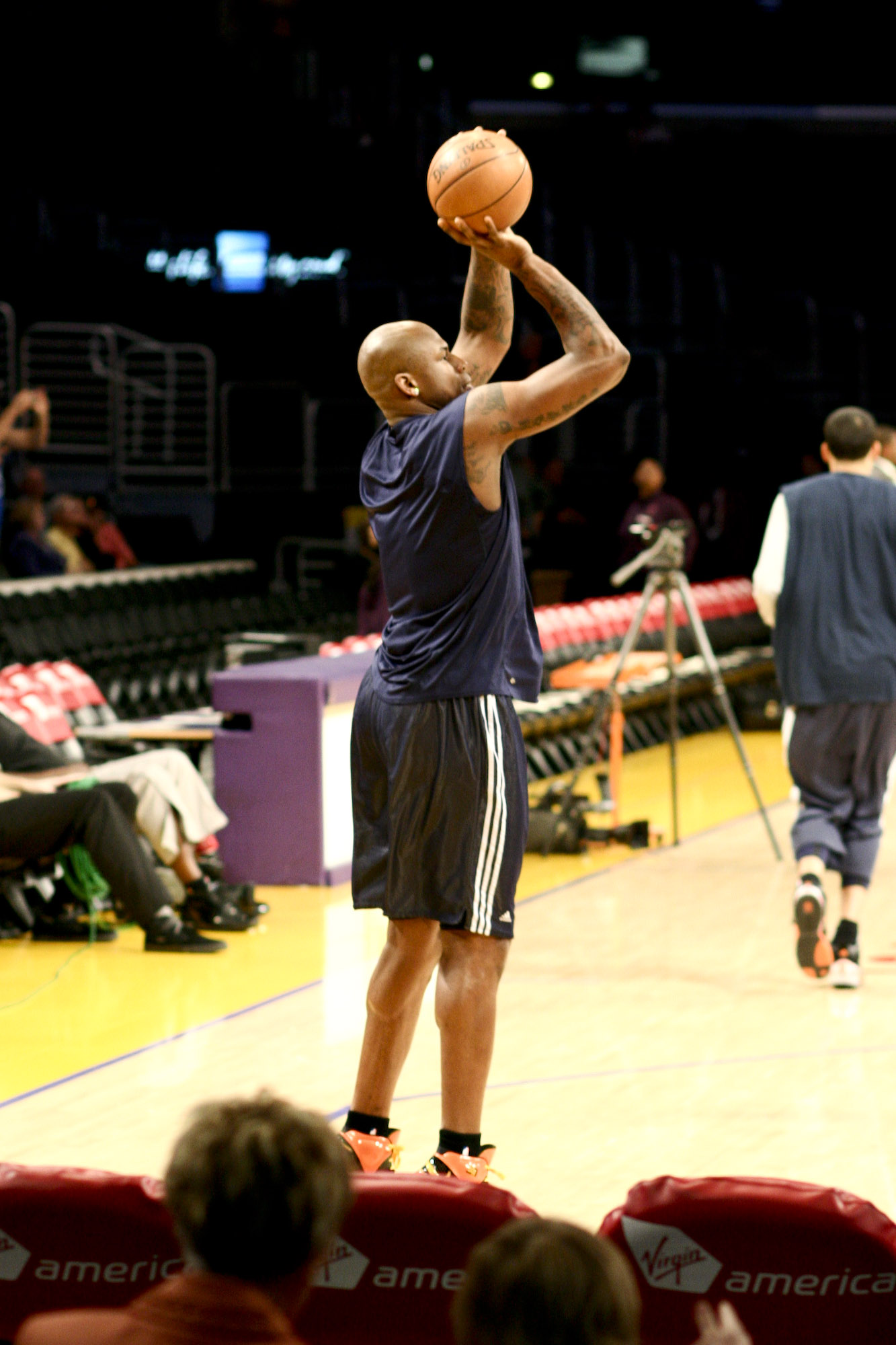
Harrington warming up before a Warriors/Lakers game on March 23, 2008.

On January 17, 2007, Harrington was dealt to the Golden State Warriors along with teammates Stephen Jackson, Šarūnas Jasikevičius, and Josh Powell for Troy Murphy, Mike Dunleavy Jr., Ike Diogu, and Keith McLeod.

=== New York Knicks (2008–2010) ===
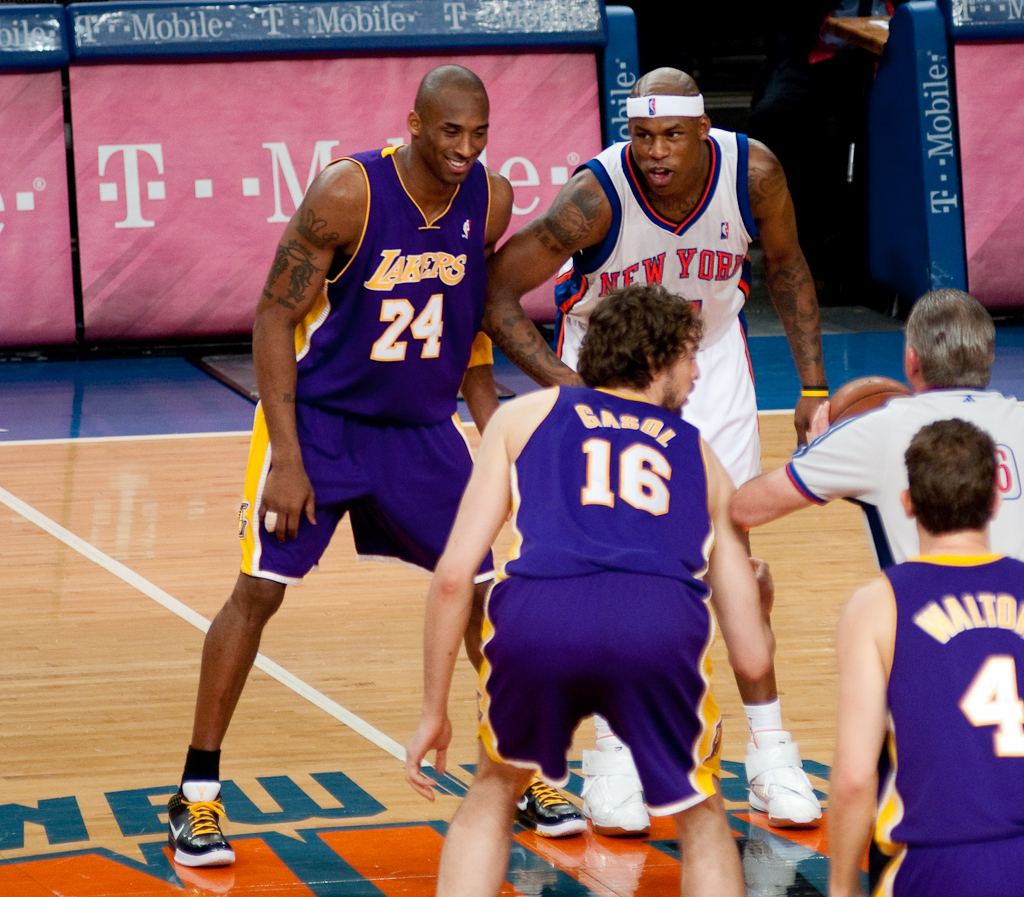
Harrington battles Kobe Bryant for position during a 2009 game.

On November 21, 2008, Harrington was traded to the New York Knicks in exchange for Jamal Crawford. In his two seasons with the Knicks, he played the best basketball of his career, but did not reach the playoffs in either season. In 140 games (66 starts), he averaged 19.2 points, 5.9 rebounds, 1.4 assists and 1.0 steals in 32.7 minutes per game.

=== Denver Nuggets (2010–2012) ===
On July 15, 2010, Harrington signed a multi-year deal with the Denver Nuggets. During the 2010–11 season, he averaged 10.5 points, 4.5 rebounds, and 1.4 assists in 22.8 minutes per game. The Nuggets finished 50–32, fifth best in the Western Conference and second in the Northwest Division. The Oklahoma City Thunder defeated the Nuggets in five games in the first round of the 2011 playoffs.

=== Orlando Magic (2012–2013) ===
On August 10, 2012, Harrington was traded to the Orlando Magic in a four-team trade which sent Dwight Howard to the Los Angeles Lakers. He only played 10 games for the Magic in 2012–13, averaging 5.1 points, 2.7 rebounds, and 1.0 assists in 11.7 minutes per game. The Magic finished with a 20–62 record, the worst record in the NBA. On August 2, 2013, Harrington was waived by the Magic.

=== Washington Wizards (2013–2014) ===
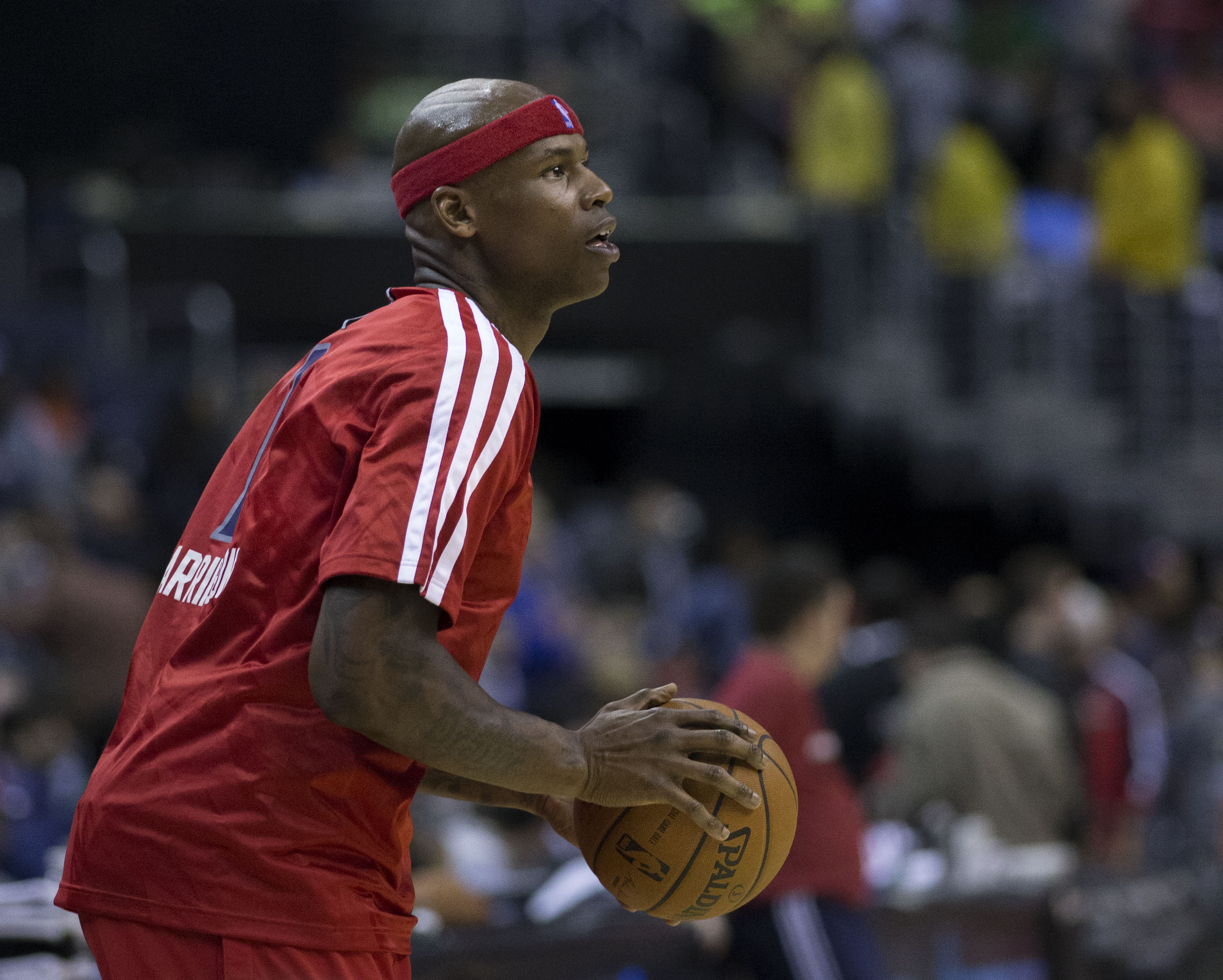
Harrington with the Washington Wizards in 2014

On August 14, 2013, Harrington signed with the Washington Wizards. He came off the bench in all 37 games he played for Washington, averaging 6.6 points and 2.4 rebounds per contest. The Wizards made their first playoff appearance since 2008, and Harrington played in 7 of the team's 11 postseason games.

=== Fujian Sturgeons (2014) ===
On August 11, 2014, Harrington signed with the Fujian Sturgeons of the Chinese Basketball Association. On November 25, 2014, he parted ways with Fujian amidst NBA interest.

After returning to the United States and not receiving any NBA offers, Harrington announced his retirement from professional basketball on March 18, 2015, after averaging 13.5 points and 5.6 rebounds in a 16-year career that included stints with seven teams.

=== Sydney Kings (2015) ===
Harrington later came out of retirement and signed with the Sydney Kings of the National Basketball League on October 28, 2015, as an injury replacement for Josh Childress. He made his debut for the Kings two days later, scoring 12 points off the bench in an 87–78 win over the Townsville Crocodiles. With Childress set to return from injury, Harrington played his last game with Sydney on November 19, recording 18 points and six rebounds in a loss to the New Zealand Breakers. In six games for the Kings, he averaged 17.7 points, 6.8 rebounds, and 2.7 assists per game.

== Big3 (2017) ==
In the summer of 2017, Harrington competed in the inaugural season of the Big3 basketball league. He played for Trilogy and served as co-captain with former teammate Kenyon Martin. The team went an undefeated 10–0 that season, winning the first-ever Big3 Championship.

== Coaching career ==
On December 24, 2021, Harrington was announced as assistant coach of South Africa's Cape Town Tigers.

== NBA career statistics ==
Legend
GP	Games played	GS	Games started	MPG	Minutes per game
FG%	Field goal percentage	3P%	3-point field goal percentage	FT%	Free throw percentage
RPG	Rebounds per game	APG	Assists per game	SPG	Steals per game
BPG	Blocks per game	PPG	Points per game	**Bold**	Career high

=== Regular season ===
Year	Team	GP	GS	MPG	FG%	3P%	FT%	RPG	APG	SPG	BPG	PPG
1998–99	Indiana	21	0	7.6	.321	.000	.600	1.9	.2	.2	.1	2.1
1999–00	Indiana	50	0	17.1	.458	.235	.703	3.2	.8	.5	.2	6.6
2000–01	Indiana	78	38	24.3	.444	.143	.656	4.9	1.7	.8	.2	7.5
2001–02	Indiana	44	1	29.8	**.475**	.333	.799	6.3	1.2	.9	**.5**	13.1
2002–03	Indiana	**82**	37	30.1	.434	.283	.770	6.2	1.5	.9	.4	12.2
2003–04	Indiana	79	15	30.9	.463	.273	.734	6.4	1.7	1.0	.3	13.3
2004–05	Atlanta	66	66	**38.6**	.459	.216	.672	**7.0**	**3.2**	1.3	.2	17.5
2005–06	Atlanta	76	**76**	36.6	.452	.346	.694	6.9	3.1	1.1	.2	18.6
2006–07	Indiana	36	36	33.6	.458	**.458**	.713	6.3	1.4	.7	.3	15.9
2006–07	Golden State	42	42	32.3	.456	.417	.681	6.4	2.3	1.0	.3	17.0
2007–08	Golden State	81	59	27.0	.434	.375	.774	5.4	1.6	.9	.2	13.6
2008–09	Golden State	5	5	33.2	.329	.393	.500	5.6	2.0	**1.4**	.0	12.4
2008–09	New York	68	51	35.0	.446	.362	**.804**	6.3	1.4	1.2	.3	**20.7**
2009–10	New York	72	15	30.5	.435	.342	.757	5.6	1.5	.9	.4	17.7
2010–11	Denver	73	3	22.8	.416	.357	.735	4.5	1.4	.5	.1	10.5
2011–12	Denver	64	1	27.5	.446	.333	.676	6.1	1.4	.9	.2	14.2
2012–13	Orlando	10	0	11.9	.351	.267	.750	2.7	1.0	.4	.1	5.1
2013–14	Washington	34	0	15.0	.396	.340	.771	2.4	.8	.4	.0	6.6
Career		981	445	28.6	.444	.352	.727	5.6	1.7	.9	.3	13.5

=== Playoffs ===
Year	Team	GP	GS	MPG	FG%	3P%	FT%	RPG	APG	SPG	BPG	PPG
2001	Indiana	3	0	13.3	.154	.000	.500	1.3	**1.0**	.0	.0	1.7
2003	Indiana	6	0	17.2	.212	.000	.667	3.7	.8	1.0	.5	3.0
2004	Indiana	**16**	2	**26.7**	.429	.400	.545	**6.4**	.8	**1.4**	**.6**	9.5
2007	Golden State	11	**5**	23.8	.398	.395	.633	4.6	.5	.5	**.6**	**10.2**
2011	Denver	5	0	14.0	**.455**	**.500**	**.750**	1.4	**1.0**	.6	.0	5.6
2012	Denver	7	0	23.3	.320	.286	.667	4.3	.9	.4	.1	9.7
2014	Washington	7	0	8.4	.400	.000	.714	2.3	.0	.6	.0	2.4
Career		55	7	20.4	.374	.317	.605	4.2	.7	.8	.4	7.3

== Cannabis ==
=== Entrepreneurship ===
After retiring from the NBA, Harrington started a business that produces cannabis extracts. The company, Viola Brands, is named after Harrington's grandmother. Suffering from glaucoma and diabetes, she tried cannabis at the urging of Harrington and found significant relief. The company cultivates cannabis in-house and has facilities in several states.

In February 2018 Harrington announced the launch of Harrington Wellness, a company that manufactures non-psychoactive cannabinoid products. Also announced was his investment in a third company Butter Baby, which makes cannabis edibles. All three companies together comprise The Harrington Group.

In July 2021, Harrington and NBA Hall of Famer Allen Iverson announced a partnership through which a line of cannabis products would be launched named "The Iverson Collection". As part of the partnership, Iverson will aid in the development of various business initiatives for Viola Brands.

In July 2022, Harrington announced a partnership with the National Basketball Players Association (NBPA) to promote his Re+Play line of CBD products, which will be sold by Amazon and Walmart.

=== Advocacy ===
Harrington is a proponent for the legalization of cannabis. In October 2016, he appeared in an online ad endorsing the passage of California's Proposition 64. He has also written an essay for The Players' Tribune titled "9 Reasons to End the War on Marijuana".

In October 2017, Harrington interviewed former NBA commissioner David Stern regarding cannabis use by players. Stern told Harrington during the interview: "I'm now at the point where personally I think [cannabis] probably should be removed from the banned list. You've persuaded me."

In January 2021, Harrington interviewed U.S. Senate Majority Leader Chuck Schumer about his efforts to end cannabis prohibition at the federal level.

== See also ==
- List of celebrities who own cannabis businesses
- List of oldest and youngest National Basketball Association players
