= 2004–05 Detroit Pistons season =

NBA team season

- Conference champions
- Division champions
- Head coach: Larry Brown
- President: Joe Dumars
- General manager: Joe Dumars
- Owner: Bill Davidson
- Arena: The Palace of Auburn Hills

Results
- Record: 54–28 (.659)
- Place: Division: 1st (Central); Conference: 2nd (Eastern)
- Playoff finish: NBA Finals (lost to Spurs 3–4)
- Stats at Basketball Reference

Local media
- Television: FSN Detroit; WKBD
- Radio: WDFN

The 2004–05 Detroit Pistons season was the 64th season for the Pistons, the 57th in the National Basketball Association, and the 48th in the Detroit area. During the offseason, the Pistons signed free agent Antonio McDyess. Coming off their upset victory over the Los Angeles Lakers in the NBA Finals, the Pistons began the season playing around .500. However, things would get out of control at the end of a November 19 game against the Indiana Pacers, when a huge brawl occurred between Pacers players and Pistons fans after Ben Wallace and Ron Artest got into a shoving match. As the season progressed, the Pistons would post an 11-game winning streak near the end of the season, and would eventually finish first overall in the Central Division, and second overall in the Eastern Conference with a 54–28 record. Ben Wallace was named Defensive Player of the Year for the third time, and was selected for the 2005 NBA All-Star Game.

In the first round of the playoffs, the Pistons defeated the Philadelphia 76ers in five games, then defeated the 6th-seeded Pacers in six games in the second round. The Pistons would then defeat the top-seeded Miami Heat in a full seven-game series after trailing 3–2 to advance to the Finals for the second straight year. However, they narrowly missed out on repeating as NBA champions, losing to the San Antonio Spurs in the 2005 NBA Finals in seven games.

After the Finals defeat, Larry Brown and the Pistons parted ways after spending two seasons as head coach. He would later be the head coach of his hometown New York Knicks, but after winning only 23 games in his only season in New York, Brown was fired again before returning to coaching with the Charlotte Bobcats. It was later announced in the off-season that Flip Saunders, who was fired as head coach of the Minnesota Timberwolves at midseason, would be the Pistons head coach for next season.

As of 2025, this marks the last time the Pistons had reached the NBA Finals.

== Draft picks ==
Draft picks for the 2004–05 Detroit Pistons season
Round	Pick	Player	Position	Nationality	College
2	54	Rickey Paulding	Guard	United States	Missouri

== Roster ==
2004–05 Detroit Pistons roster
Players

Pos.	No.	Player	Height	Weight	DOB	From
PG	30	Carlos Arroyo	6 ft 2 in (1.88 m)	200 lb (91 kg)	1979-07-30	FIU
PG	1	Chauncey Billups	6 ft 3 in (1.91 m)	202 lb (92 kg)	1976-09-25	Colorado
C	41	Elden Campbell	6 ft 11 in (2.11 m)	279 lb (127 kg)	1968-07-23	Clemson
SG	20	Carlos Delfino	6 ft 6 in (1.98 m)	230 lb (104 kg)	1982-08-29	Argentina
SF	12	Ronald Dupree	6 ft 7 in (2.01 m)	209 lb (95 kg)	1981-01-26	LSU
SF	8	Darvin Ham	6 ft 7 in (2.01 m)	240 lb (109 kg)	1973-07-23	Texas Tech
SG	32	Richard Hamilton	6 ft 7 in (2.01 m)	193 lb (88 kg)	1978-02-14	Connecticut
SG	10	Lindsey Hunter	6 ft 2 in (1.88 m)	195 lb (88 kg)	1970-12-03	Jackson State
PG	5	Horace Jenkins	6 ft 1 in (1.85 m)	180 lb (82 kg)	1974-10-14	William Paterson
PF	24	Antonio McDyess	6 ft 9 in (2.06 m)	220 lb (100 kg)	1974-09-07	Alabama
C	31	Darko Miličić	7 ft 0 in (2.13 m)	275 lb (125 kg)	1985-06-20	Serbia
SF	22	Tayshaun Prince	6 ft 9 in (2.06 m)	215 lb (98 kg)	1980-02-28	Kentucky
C	3	Ben Wallace	6 ft 9 in (2.06 m)	245 lb (111 kg)	1974-09-10	Virginia Union
PF	36	Rasheed Wallace	6 ft 11 in (2.11 m)	230 lb (104 kg)	1974-09-17	North Carolina
C	44	Derrick Coleman	6 ft 10 in (2.08 m)	258 lb (117 kg)	1967-06-21	Syracuse

Coaches
Head coach
- Larry Brown
Assistant(s)
- Phil Ford
- Dave Hanners
- Gar Heard
- Igor Kokoškov
- Pat Sullivan
- Mike Abdenour (trainer)

Legend
- (DP) Unsigned draft pick
- (FA) Free agent
- (S) Suspended
- Injured

Roster
Updated: March 4, 2005

== Regular season ==
=== Standings ===
Central Division	W	L	PCT	GB	Home	Road	Div
y-Detroit Pistons	54	28	.659	–	32–9	22–19	8–8
x-Chicago Bulls	47	35	.573	7	27–14	20–21	8–8
x-Indiana Pacers	44	38	.537	10	25–16	19–22	9–7
e-Cleveland Cavaliers	42	40	.512	12	29–12	13–28	7–9
e-Milwaukee Bucks	30	52	.366	24	23–18	7–34	8–8

Eastern Conference
#	Team	W	L	PCT	GB
1	c-Miami Heat	59	23	.720	–
2	y-Detroit Pistons	54	28	.659	5
3	y-Boston Celtics	45	37	.549	14
4	x-Chicago Bulls	47	35	.573	12
5	x-Washington Wizards	45	37	.549	14
6	x-Indiana Pacers	44	38	.537	15
7	x-Philadelphia 76ers	43	39	.524	16
8	x-New Jersey Nets	42	40	.512	17
9	e-Cleveland Cavaliers	42	40	.512	17
10	e-Orlando Magic	36	46	.439	23
11	e-New York Knicks	33	49	.402	26
12	e-Toronto Raptors	33	49	.402	26
13	e-Milwaukee Bucks	30	52	.366	29
14	e-Charlotte Bobcats	18	64	.220	41
15	e-Atlanta Hawks	13	69	.159	46

== Playoffs ==
2005 playoff game log
First Round: 4–1 (home: 3–0; road: 1–1)

Game	Date	Team	Score	High points	High rebounds	High assists	Location Attendance	Series
1	April 23	Philadelphia	W 106–85	Rasheed Wallace (29)	B. Wallace, R. Wallace (10)	Richard Hamilton (5)	The Palace of Auburn Hills; 22,076	1–0
2	April 26	Philadelphia	W 99–84	Richard Hamilton (23)	Ben Wallace (10)	Chauncey Billups (8)	The Palace of Auburn Hills; 22,076	2–0
3	April 29	@ Philadelphia	L 104–115	Ben Wallace (29)	Ben Wallace (16)	Richard Hamilton (12)	Wachovia Center; 16,907	2–1
4	May 1	@ Philadelphia	W 97–92 (OT)	Chauncey Billups (25)	Ben Wallace (12)	Chauncey Billups (7)	Wachovia Center; 15,894	3–1
5	May 3	Philadelphia	W 88–78	Billups, Hamilton (23)	Ben Wallace (13)	Chauncey Billups (7)	The Palace of Auburn Hills; 22,076	4–1

Conference Semifinals: 4–2 (home: 2–1; road: 2–1)

Game	Date	Team	Score	High points	High rebounds	High assists	Location Attendance	Series
1	May 9	Indiana	W 96–81	Richard Hamilton (28)	Ben Wallace (15)	Chauncey Billups (7)	The Palace of Auburn Hills; 22,076	1–0
2	May 11	Indiana	L 83–92	Tayshaun Prince (24)	Ben Wallace (16)	Chauncey Billups (10)	The Palace of Auburn Hills; 22,076	1–1
3	May 13	@ Indiana	L 74–79	Chauncey Billups (23)	Ben Wallace (14)	Tayshaun Prince (6)	Conseco Fieldhouse; 18,345	1–2
4	May 15	@ Indiana	W 89–76	Chauncey Billups (29)	Rasheed Wallace (12)	Richard Hamilton (7)	Conseco Fieldhouse; 18,345	2–2
5	May 17	Indiana	W 86–67	Ben Wallace (19)	Tayshaun Prince (9)	Chauncey Billups (7)	The Palace of Auburn Hills; 22,076	3–2
6	May 19	@ Indiana	W 88–79	Richard Hamilton (28)	B. Wallace, R. Wallace (11)	Chauncey Billups (8)	Conseco Fieldhouse; 18,345	4–2

Conference Finals: 4–3 (home: 2–1; road: 2–2)

Game	Date	Team	Score	High points	High rebounds	High assists	Location Attendance	Series
1	May 23	@ Miami	W 90–81	Rasheed Wallace (20)	Ben Wallace (13)	Carlos Arroyo (7)	American Airlines Arena; 20,203	1–0
2	May 25	@ Miami	L 86–92	Richard Hamilton (21)	Ben Wallace (14)	Chauncey Billups (6)	American Airlines Arena; 20,228	1–1
3	May 29	Miami	L 104–113	Richard Hamilton (33)	Rasheed Wallace (8)	Richard Hamilton (5)	The Palace of Auburn Hills; 22,076	1–2
4	May 31	Miami	W 106–96	Richard Hamilton (28)	Ben Wallace (15)	Richard Hamilton (8)	The Palace of Auburn Hills; 22,076	2–2
5	June 2	@ Miami	L 76–88	Richard Hamilton (21)	Antonio McDyess (9)	Richard Hamilton (5)	American Airlines Arena; 20,225	2–3
6	June 4	Miami	W 91–66	Richard Hamilton (24)	Prince, R. Wallace (9)	Chauncey Billups (7)	The Palace of Auburn Hills; 22,076	3–3
7	June 6	@ Miami	W 88–82	Richard Hamilton (22)	Ben Wallace (9)	Chauncey Billups (8)	American Airlines Arena; 20,241	4–3

NBA Finals: 3–4 (home: 2–1; road: 1–3)

Game	Date	Team	Score	High points	High rebounds	High assists	Location Attendance	Series
1	June 9	@ San Antonio	L 69–84	Chauncey Billups (25)	Ben Wallace (8)	Chauncey Billups (6)	SBC Center; 18,797	0–1
2	June 12	@ San Antonio	L 76–97	Antonio McDyess (15)	B. Wallace, R. Wallace (8)	Rasheed Wallace (4)	SBC Center; 18,797	0–2
3	June 14	San Antonio	W 96–79	Richard Hamilton (24)	Ben Wallace (11)	Chauncey Billups (7)	The Palace of Auburn Hills; 22,076	1–2
4	June 16	San Antonio	W 102–71	Billups, Hunter (17)	Ben Wallace (13)	Chauncey Billups (7)	The Palace of Auburn Hills; 22,076	2–2
5	June 19	San Antonio	L 95–96 (OT)	Chauncey Billups (34)	Ben Wallace (12)	Chauncey Billups (7)	The Palace of Auburn Hills; 22,076	2–3
6	June 21	@ San Antonio	W 95–86	Richard Hamilton (23)	Ben Wallace (9)	Chauncey Billups (6)	SBC Center; 18,797	3–3
7	June 23	@ San Antonio	L 74–81	Richard Hamilton (15)	Ben Wallace (11)	Chauncey Billups (8)	SBC Center; 18,797	3–4

2005 schedule

== Awards and records ==
- Ben Wallace, NBA Defensive Player of the Year Award
- Ben Wallace, All-NBA Third Team
- Ben Wallace, NBA All-Defensive First Team
- Chauncey Billups, NBA All-Defensive Second Team
- Tayshaun Prince, NBA All-Defensive Second Team

== Player statistics ==
Legend
GP	Games played	GS	Games started	MPG	Minutes per game
FG%	Field-goal percentage	3P%	3-point field-goal percentage	FT%	Free-throw percentage
RPG	Rebounds per game	APG	Assists per game	SPG	Steals per game
BPG	Blocks per game	PPG	Points per game

=== Regular season ===
Player	GP	GS	MPG	FG%	3P%	FT%	RPG	APG	SPG	BPG	PPG
Carlos Arroyo^{†}	40	0	17.7	.376	.083	.767	1.5	3.2	.6	.0	5.4
Chauncey Billups	80	80	35.8	.442	.426	.898	3.4	5.8	1.0	.1	16.5
Elden Campbell^{†}	30	1	11.3	.336	.000	.784	2.7	.5	.3	.2	3.9
Derrick Coleman	5	0	10.0	.214	.000	1.000	3.0	.0	.0	.0	1.8
Carlos Delfino	30	4	15.3	.359	.257	.575	1.8	1.3	.7	.2	3.9
Ronald Dupree	47	0	10.0	.480	.500	.617	2.0	.5	.1	.2	3.2
Anthony Goldwire^{†}	9	0	6.1	.267	.333	.875	.9	.0	.0	.0	2.0
Darvin Ham	47	0	5.9	.459		.387	.7	.1	.1	.1	1.0
Richard Hamilton	76	76	38.5	.440	.305	.858	3.9	4.9	1.0	.2	18.7
Lindsey Hunter	76	3	15.1	.358	.274	.793	1.6	1.7	.9	.2	3.8
Horace Jenkins	15	0	6.9	.333	.000	.923	.6	.6	.3	.1	2.8
Antonio McDyess	77	8	23.3	.513	.000	.656	6.3	.9	.6	.7	9.6
Darko Miličić	37	2	6.9	.329		.708	1.2	.2	.1	.5	1.8
Smush Parker^{†}	11	1	10.0	.393	.222	.692	.8	1.0	.3	.0	3.0
Tayshaun Prince	82	82	37.1	.487	.341	.807	5.3	3.0	.7	.9	14.7
Ben Wallace	74	74	36.1	.453	.111	.428	12.2	1.7	1.4	2.4	9.7
Rasheed Wallace	79	79	34.0	.440	.318	.697	8.2	1.8	.8	1.5	14.5

=== Playoffs ===
Player	GP	GS	MPG	FG%	3P%	FT%	RPG	APG	SPG	BPG	PPG
Carlos Arroyo	19	0	7.9	.356	.000	.667	.5	2.1	.2	.1	2.1
Chauncey Billups	25	25	39.4	.428	.349	.893	4.3	6.5	1.0	.2	18.7
Elden Campbell	10	0	5.7	.308		.500	1.8	.5	.2	.0	1.2
Ronald Dupree	14	0	2.7	.286			.4	.0	.0	.0	.3
Darvin Ham	14	0	1.7	.333		1.000	.2	.0	.0	.0	.3
Richard Hamilton	25	25	43.2	.453	.294	.798	4.3	4.3	.8	.1	20.0
Lindsey Hunter	25	0	15.0	.319	.222	.727	1.6	1.6	.9	.3	3.8
Antonio McDyess	25	0	19.8	.486		.694	5.9	.8	.6	.9	8.0
Darko Miličić	9	0	2.3	.286		1.000	.4	.1	.0	.1	.6
Tayshaun Prince	25	25	40.9	.433	.367	.800	6.3	3.3	1.0	.4	13.4
Ben Wallace	25	25	39.2	.481	.000	.461	11.3	1.0	1.7	2.4	10.0
Rasheed Wallace	25	25	33.0	.439	.337	.741	6.9	1.3	1.0	1.8	13.6

- ^{†} Denotes player spent time with another team in the season. Stats reflect time with the Pistons only.
