= 2004–05 Miami Heat season =

NBA professional basketball team season

- Division champions
- Head coach: Stan Van Gundy
- President: Pat Riley
- General manager: Randy Pfund
- Owner: Micky Arison
- Arena: American Airlines Arena

Results
- Record: 59–23 (.720)
- Place: Division: 1st (Southeast); Conference: 1st (Eastern)
- Playoff finish: Eastern Conference Finals (lost to Pistons 3–4)
- Stats at Basketball Reference

Local media
- Television: Sunshine Network/Sun Sports
- Radio: WIOD

The 2004–05 Miami Heat season was the 17th season for the Miami Heat in the National Basketball Association. The Heat entered the season with high expectations following the acquisition of All-Star center Shaquille O'Neal from the Los Angeles Lakers, plus signing free agents Christian Laettner, three-point specialist Damon Jones, and Shandon Anderson. O'Neal was traded away from the Lakers following recurrence of bad blood with former teammate Kobe Bryant. Despite their numerous conflicts during their 8 years as teammates, the duo led the Lakers to 3-straight championship titles from 2000 to 2002.

The team played solid basketball posting a 14-game winning streak between December and January winning 25 of their first 32 games, then winning twelve straight between February and March. At midseason, the team re-signed free agent All-Star center Alonzo Mourning, and re-acquired former Heat guard Steve Smith from the expansion Charlotte Bobcats. The Heat finished in first place in both their division and conference with a 59–23 record, which was the franchise's best since 1996–97.

Second-year star Dwyane Wade led the Heat in scoring averaging 24.1 points per game, while O'Neal finished second on the team in scoring with 22.9 points per game. Both players were selected to play in the 2005 NBA All-Star Game at Denver, which marked Wade's first All-Star appearance.

In the first round of the playoffs, the Heat swept the New Jersey Nets in four straight games, then swept the Washington Wizards in four straight in the semi-finals. However, the Heat were eventually eliminated in seven games during the Eastern Conference finals by the 2nd-seeded, and defending NBA champion Detroit Pistons. The Wade and Shaq-led Heat were expected by many to face the Spurs in the Finals (They would eventually meet 8 years later). Following the season, Eddie Jones was traded to the Memphis Grizzlies, Damon Jones signed as a free agent with the Cleveland Cavaliers, and Laettner and Smith both retired.

This was the first and last time the Heat would be eliminated in the Conference Finals until 2022.

== Key dates ==
- June 24 - The 2004 NBA draft took place in New York City.
- July 8 - The free agency period started.
- July 14 - The Heat traded Lamar Odom, Caron Butler, Brian Grant and a 2006 first-round draft pick (Jordan Farmar) to the Los Angeles Lakers in exchange for Shaquille O'Neal.
- October 5 - The Heat played their first preseason game on the road against the Houston Rockets at the Toyota Center.
- October 27 - The Heat's regular season began with an away game versus the New Jersey Nets at the Continental Airlines Arena.

== Offseason ==
=== 2004 NBA draft ===
Round	Pick	Player	Position	Nationality	School/Club team
1	19	Dorell Wright	Forward	United States	South Kent Prep HS (CT)
2	47	Pape Sow	Forward	Senegal	Cal State Fullerton
2	53	Matt Freije	Forward	United States	Vanderbilt

=== Free agency ===
==== Additions ====
Re-signings:

- Rasual Butler

Signings:

- Michael Doleac (from Denver)
- Keyon Dooling (from L.A. Clippers)
- Damon Jones (from Milwaukee)
- Christian Laettner (from Golden State)
- Wesley Person (from Atlanta)

Trades:

- Shaquille O'Neal (from L.A. Lakers)

==== Subtractions ====
Free agents:

- Rafer Alston (to Toronto)
- Samaki Walker (to Washington)

Trades:

- Caron Butler (to L.A. Lakers)
- Brian Grant (to L.A. Lakers)
- Lamar Odom (to L.A. Lakers)

Expansion draft:

- Loren Woods (to Charlotte)

== Roster ==
2004–05 Miami Heat roster
Players

Pos.	No.	Player	Height	Weight	DOB	From
SF	49	Shandon Anderson	6 ft 6 in (1.98 m)	208 lb (94 kg)	1973-12-31	Georgia
SF	45	Rasual Butler	6 ft 7 in (2.01 m)	205 lb (93 kg)	1979-05-23	La Salle
C	51	Michael Doleac	6 ft 11 in (2.11 m)	262 lb (119 kg)	1977-06-15	Utah
PG	5	Keyon Dooling	6 ft 3 in (1.91 m)	196 lb (89 kg)	1980-05-08	Missouri
PF	40	Udonis Haslem	6 ft 8 in (2.03 m)	235 lb (107 kg)	1980-06-09	Florida
PG	19	Damon Jones	6 ft 3 in (1.91 m)	185 lb (84 kg)	1976-08-25	Houston
SF	6	Eddie Jones	6 ft 6 in (1.98 m)	200 lb (91 kg)	1971-10-20	Temple
PF	44	Christian Laettner	6 ft 11 in (2.11 m)	235 lb (107 kg)	1969-08-17	Duke
C	33	Alonzo Mourning	6 ft 10 in (2.08 m)	240 lb (109 kg)	1970-02-08	Georgetown
C	32	Shaquille O'Neal	7 ft 1 in (2.16 m)	325 lb (147 kg)	1972-03-06	LSU
SG	8	Steve Smith	6 ft 7 in (2.01 m)	200 lb (91 kg)	1969-03-31	Michigan State
SG	3	Dwyane Wade	6 ft 4 in (1.93 m)	220 lb (100 kg)	1982-01-17	Marquette
SF	24	Qyntel Woods	6 ft 8 in (2.03 m)	221 lb (100 kg)	1981-02-16	Northeast Mississippi CC
SF	1	Dorell Wright	6 ft 9 in (2.06 m)	205 lb (93 kg)	1985-12-02	South Kent Prep HS (CT)
C	16	Wang Zhizhi	7 ft 1 in (2.16 m)	284 lb (129 kg)	1977-07-08	China

Coaches
Head coach
- Stan Van Gundy
Assistant(s)
- Keith Askins
- Bill Foran
- Bob McAdoo
- Ron Rothstein
- Erik Spoelstra

Legend
- (DP) Unsigned draft pick
- (FA) Free agent
- (S) Suspended
- Injured

Roster
Updated: March 1, 2005

== Pre-season ==
2004 Pre-season game log: 4–3–0 (home: 3–0–0; road: 1–3–0)
#	Date	Visitor	Score	Home	OT	Decision	Venue	Record	Recap
1	October 10	Miami Heat	75–85	Houston Rockets		Loss	Toyota Center	0–1
2	October 15	Orlando Magic	89–95	Miami Heat		Win	St. Pete Times Forum (Tampa, Florida)	1–1
3	October 16	Detroit Pistons	74–83	Miami Heat		Win	ALLTEL Arena (Little Rock, Arkansas)	2–1
4	October 18	Atlanta Hawks	82–92	Miami Heat		Win	American Airlines Arena	3–1
5	October 22	Miami Heat	113–82	Atlanta Hawks		Win	Philips Arena	4–1
6	October 26	Miami Heat	74–82	Charlotte Bobcats		Loss	Charlotte Coliseum	4–2
7	October 27	Miami Heat	103–109	Orlando Magic		Loss	TD Waterhouse Centre	4–3

== Regular season ==
=== Standings ===
Southeast Division	W	L	PCT	GB	Home	Road	Div	GP
Miami Heat	59	23	.720	–	35–6	24–17	15–1	82
Washington Wizards	45	37	.549	14	29–12	16–25	10–6	82
Orlando Magic	36	46	.439	23	24–17	12–29	6–10	82
Charlotte Bobcats	18	64	.220	41	14–27	4–37	7–9	82
Atlanta Hawks	13	69	.159	46	9–32	4–37	2–14	82

=== Game log ===
2004–05 game log
Total: – (Home: –; Road: –)
November

Game	Date	Team	Score	High points	High rebounds	High assists	Location Attendance	Record
1	November 3	@New Jersey Nets	100–77				Continental Airlines Arena	1–0
2	November 4	Cleveland Cavaliers	92–86				AmericanAirlines	2–0
3	November 6	@Washington Wizards	118–106				MCI Center	3–0
4	November 9	Washington Wizards	103–93					4–0
5	November 11	Dallas Mavericks	93–113				AmericanAirlines Arena	4–1
6	November 12	@San Antonio Spurs	84–93					4–2
7	November 14	Milwaukee Bucks	112–110				AmericanAirlines Arena	5–2
8	November 16	@Minnesota Timberwolves	97–108				Target Center	5–3
9	November 17	@Milwaukee Bucks	113–106				Bradley Center	6–3
10	November 19	Utah Jazz	107–105				AmericanAirlines	7–3
11	November 21	Philadelphia 76ers	93–83					8–3
12	November 23	Portland Trail Blazers	87–99					8–4
13	November 24	@Atlanta Hawks	99–93				Philips Arena	9–4
14	November 26	@Detroit Pistons	77–78				The Palace of Auburn Hills	9–5
15	November 28	Boston Celtics	106–104					10–5
16	November 30	Toronto Raptors	92–94				AmericanAirlines Arena	10–6

December

Game	Date	Team	Score	High points	High rebounds	High assists	Location Attendance	Record
17	December 3	@Chicago Bulls	–				United Center	
18	December 4	@Denver Nuggets	–				Pepsi Center	
19	December 6	@Utah Jazz	–				Delta Center	
20	December 8	@Milwaukee Bucks	–				Bradley Center	
21	December 10	Memphis Grizzlies	–				AmericanAirlines Arena	
22	December 12	Toronto Raptors	–				Air Canada Centre	
23	December 13	Washington Wizards	–				AmericanAirlines Arena	
24	December 15	@Washington Wizards	98–93				MCI Center	
25	December 17	Denver Nuggets	107–100				AmericanAirlines Arena	
26	December 19	Orlando Magic	117–107				AmericanAirlines Arena	
27	December 21	Boston Celtics	108–100				AmericanAirlines Arena	
28	December 23		109–107					ARCO Arena
29	December 25	104–102					STAPLES Center	
30	December 27	Atlanta Hawks	116–102				AmericanAirlines Arena	
31	December 30	@Detroit Pistons	89–78				The Palace of Auburn Hills	

2004–05 season schedule

== Playoffs ==
2005 playoff game log
First Round: 4–0 (home: 2–0; road: 2–0)

Game	Date	Team	Score	High points	High rebounds	High assists	Location Attendance	Series
1	April 24	New Jersey	W 116–98	Dwyane Wade (32)	Haslem, O'Neal (11)	Dwyane Wade (8)	American Airlines Arena; 20,212	1–0
2	April 26	New Jersey	W 104–87	Alonzo Mourning (21)	Shaquille O'Neal (10)	Dwyane Wade (10)	American Airlines Arena; 20,276	2–0
3	April 28	@ New Jersey	W 108–105 (2OT)	Shaquille O'Neal (25)	Udonis Haslem (19)	Dwyane Wade (8)	Continental Airlines Arena; 20,174	3–0
4	May 1	@ New Jersey	W 110–97	Dwyane Wade (34)	Udonis Haslem (11)	Dwyane Wade (9)	Continental Airlines Arena; 20,174	4–0

Conference Semifinals: 4–0 (home: 2–0; road: 2–0)

Game	Date	Team	Score	High points	High rebounds	High assists	Location Attendance	Series
1	May 8	Washington	W 105–86	Dwyane Wade (20)	Eddie Jones (8)	Dwyane Wade (7)	American Airlines Arena; 20,151	1–0
2	May 10	Washington	W 108–102	Dwyane Wade (31)	Udonis Haslem (13)	Dwyane Wade (15)	American Airlines Arena; 20,205	2–0
3	May 12	@ Washington	W 102–95	Dwyane Wade (31)	Alonzo Mourning (13)	D. Jones, Wade (6)	MCI Center; 20,173	3–0
4	May 14	@ Washington	W 99–95	Dwyane Wade (42)	Udonis Haslem (13)	Damon Jones (6)	MCI Center; 20,173	4–0

Conference Finals: 3–4 (home: 2–2; road: 1–2)

Game	Date	Team	Score	High points	High rebounds	High assists	Location Attendance	Series
1	May 23	Detroit	L 81–90	Eddie Jones (22)	Eddie Jones (8)	Damon Jones (5)	American Airlines Arena; 20,203	0–1
2	May 25	Detroit	W 92–86	Dwyane Wade (40)	Shaquille O'Neal (10)	Dwyane Wade (6)	American Airlines Arena; 20,228	1–1
3	May 29	@ Detroit	W 113–104	Dwyane Wade (36)	D. Jones, Wade (7)	D. Jones, O'Neal (5)	The Palace of Auburn Hills; 22,076	2–1
4	May 31	@ Detroit	L 96–106	Dwyane Wade (28)	Eddie Jones (10)	Dwyane Wade (6)	The Palace of Auburn Hills; 22,076	2–2
5	June 2	Detroit	W 88–76	Shaquille O'Neal (20)	Udonis Haslem (13)	Damon Jones (6)	American Airlines Arena; 20,225	3–2
6	June 4	@ Detroit	L 66–91	Shaquille O'Neal (24)	Shaquille O'Neal (13)	Damon Jones (6)	The Palace of Auburn Hills; 22,076	3–3
7	June 6	Detroit	L 82–88	Shaquille O'Neal (27)	Udonis Haslem (10)	Dwyane Wade (4)	American Airlines Arena; 20,241	3–4

2005 schedule

== Player statistics ==
=== Regular season ===
Player	POS	GP	GS	MP	REB	AST	STL	BLK	PTS	MPG	RPG	APG	SPG	BPG	PPG
Damon Jones	PG	82	66	2,576	231	350	44	5	955	31.4	2.8	4.3	.5	.1	11.6
Eddie Jones	SF	80	80	2,839	405	212	86	38	1,018	35.5	5.1	2.7	1.1	.5	12.7
Udonis Haslem	PF	80	80	2,675	726	108	63	41	870	33.4	9.1	1.4	.8	.5	10.9
Michael Doleac	C	80	8	1,175	259	47	23	22	321	14.7	3.2	.6	.3	.3	4.0
Dwyane Wade	SG	77	77	2,974	397	520	121	82	1,854	38.6	5.2	6.8	1.6	1.1	24.1
Keyon Dooling	PG	74	0	1,184	90	132	39	11	382	16.0	1.2	1.8	.5	.1	5.2
Shaquille O'Neal	C	73	73	2,492	760	200	36	171	1,669	34.1	10.4	2.7	.5	2.3	22.9
Rasual Butler	SF	65	15	1,203	151	62	18	29	420	18.5	2.3	1.0	.3	.4	6.5
Shandon Anderson^{†}	SF	65	5	1,151	190	70	40	14	255	17.7	2.9	1.1	.6	.2	3.9
Christian Laettner	PF	49	0	739	131	41	32	15	260	15.1	2.7	.8	.7	.3	5.3
Wang Zhizhi	C	20	0	92	18	5	3	2	43	4.6	.9	.3	.2	.1	2.2
Alonzo Mourning^{†}	C	19	3	245	71	4	3	33	95	12.9	3.7	.2	.2	1.7	5.0
Wesley Person^{†}	SF	16	3	206	22	11	6	0	62	12.9	1.4	.7	.4	.0	3.9
Malik Allen^{†}	PF	14	0	248	52	11	4	11	83	17.7	3.7	.8	.3	.8	5.9
Steve Smith^{†}	SG	13	0	114	16	14	2	0	23	8.8	1.2	1.1	.2	.0	1.8
Qyntel Woods	SF	3	0	40	6	0	4	0	10	13.3	2.0	.0	1.3	.0	3.3
Dorell Wright	SF	3	0	27	1	3	4	0	7	9.0	.3	1.0	1.3	.0	2.3

- ^{†} Denotes player spent time with another team in the season. Stats reflect time with the Heat only.

=== Playoffs ===
Player	POS	GP	GS	MP	REB	AST	STL	BLK	PTS	MPG	RPG	APG	SPG	BPG	PPG
Eddie Jones	SF	15	15	601	87	39	18	9	205	40.1	5.8	2.6	1.2	.6	13.7
Udonis Haslem	PF	15	15	543	150	15	8	6	138	36.2	10.0	1.0	.5	.4	9.2
Damon Jones	PG	15	15	498	41	60	7	0	181	33.2	2.7	4.0	.5	.0	12.1
Alonzo Mourning	C	15	2	254	72	5	5	33	91	16.9	4.8	.3	.3	2.2	6.1
Keyon Dooling	PG	15	0	264	16	25	6	1	110	17.6	1.1	1.7	.4	.1	7.3
Dwyane Wade	SG	14	14	571	80	93	22	16	384	40.8	5.7	6.6	1.6	1.1	27.4
Shaquille O'Neal	C	13	13	431	102	25	5	19	252	33.2	7.8	1.9	.4	1.5	19.4
Christian Laettner	PF	13	0	136	25	7	4	0	29	10.5	1.9	.5	.3	.0	2.2
Rasual Butler	SF	12	1	182	18	7	1	1	56	15.2	1.5	.6	.1	.1	4.7
Michael Doleac	C	9	0	65	14	0	1	1	16	7.2	1.6	.0	.1	.1	1.8
Shandon Anderson	SF	8	0	97	19	8	5	0	8	12.1	2.4	1.0	.6	.0	1.0
Steve Smith	SG	3	0	8	0	0	0	0	0	2.7	.0	.0	.0	.0	.0

== Awards, records and milestones ==
=== Awards ===
==== Week/Month ====
Shaquille O'Neal "32" Dwyane Wade "3"

== Transactions ==
=== Trades ===
Shaquielle O'Neal from L.A. Lakers
