= 2004–05 NBA season =

59th NBA season

- League: National Basketball Association
- Sport: Basketball
- Duration: November 2, 2004 – April 20, 2005; April 23 – June 6, 2005 (Playoffs); June 9–23, 2005 (Finals)
- Games: 82
- Teams: 30
- TV partner(s): ABC, TNT, ESPN, NBA TV

Draft
- Top draft pick: Dwight Howard
- Picked by: Orlando Magic

Regular season
- Top seed: Phoenix Suns
- Season MVP: Steve Nash (Phoenix)
- Top scorer: Allen Iverson (Philadelphia)

Playoffs
- Eastern champions: Detroit Pistons
- Eastern runners-up: Miami Heat
- Western champions: San Antonio Spurs
- Western runners-up: Phoenix Suns

Finals
- Champions: San Antonio Spurs
- Runners-up: Detroit Pistons
- Finals MVP: Tim Duncan (San Antonio)

NBA seasons
- ← 2003–04 2005–06 →

The 2004–05 NBA season was the 59th season of the National Basketball Association (NBA). It began on November 2, 2004, and ended on June 23, 2005. The season ended with the San Antonio Spurs defeating the defending champion Detroit Pistons, 4–3, in the NBA Finals.

== Notable occurrences ==
- The NBA made its return to Charlotte as the Charlotte Bobcats. The Bobcats played their first season at the Charlotte Coliseum. As of 2014, the Bobcats' first season was treated as the Hornets' 15th season due to the franchise reacquiring the records and history of the original franchise from the now-New Orleans Pelicans from 1988 to 2002. As a result, the 2002–03 and 2003–04 seasons were retconned as having "suspended operations".
- This season also was the first year of the NBA's new divisional alignments, separating the league into six divisions of five teams instead of the previous four divisions of varying numbers of teams. As part of this realignment, the New Orleans Hornets moved from the Eastern Conference to the Western Conference.
- The current schedule format also debuted this season:
  - 16 games against teams in the same division (four against each team)
  - 24 games against six of the remaining conference teams combined, three from each division (four against each team)
  - 12 games against the remaining four conference teams, two from each division (three against each team)
  - 30 games against teams in the other conference (two against each team)
  - Over five seasons, each team played each of the other conference teams outside its division a total of 18 times – 9 at home and 9 on the road.
- In February, Chris Webber was traded from the Sacramento Kings along with Michael Bradley to the Philadelphia 76ers for three forwards (Corliss Williamson, Kenny Thomas, and Brian Skinner). The Kings lost in the first round of the playoffs to the Seattle SuperSonics, 4–1, and failed to make the playoffs after 2006.
- The 2005 NBA All-Star Game was played on February 20, 2005, at the Pepsi Center in Denver, Colorado, with the East winning, 125–115. Philadelphia's Allen Iverson was named the MVP of the game.
- During All-Star Weekend, Quentin Richardson won the Three-point Shootout, Steve Nash won the Skills Challenge, and Diana Taurasi, Dan Majerle and Shawn Marion won the Shooting Stars Competition—all Phoenix Suns victories. Amar'e Stoudemire made it to the final round of the Slam Dunk Contest but failed to complete the sweep for the Suns.
- Prior to the start of this season, Shaquille O'Neal was traded to the Miami Heat after his reported fallout with former Lakers teammate Kobe Bryant. Some fans sensed this, along with the Pistons' 2004 championship, as a possible end of dominance by the Western Conference. The Lakers also witnessed the loss of head coach Phil Jackson and replacement Rudy Tomjanovich as the Lakers missed out on the NBA playoffs for the fifth time in their history. However, the Western Conference has continued its domination in the regular season; since then, all playoff-bound teams in the West have either won 50 or more games, or were above .500 at the end of the season, in contrast to the Eastern Conference, where on average, three teams have had sub-.500 records.
- During the off-season, the Phoenix Suns signed unrestricted free agent Steve Nash. With the addition of coach Mike D'Antoni and his offensive-minded strategy combined with Nash's play-making skills, Phoenix won 33 games more than the year before. The Suns had the best overall record in the NBA, Nash won the MVP Award and D'Antoni won the Coach of the Year Award.
- The Memphis Grizzlies played their first game at FedExForum. The Grizzlies were also the first NBA team to install see-through shot clocks. As of the 2011–12 NBA season, all 30 teams have see-through shot clocks.
- A November 19 game between Detroit and Indiana at The Palace of Auburn Hills was disrupted with 45.9 seconds to go as a major altercation broke out between players and fans. This resulted in record-breaking suspensions, most notable of which was Ron Artest who received the longest suspension in NBA history (73 games plus the playoffs). The NBA also overhauled its league-wide security policy. This became known as "The Malice at the Palace".
- On December 9, Tracy McGrady of the Houston Rockets scored 13 points in the final 35 seconds of a game against the San Antonio Spurs to lead his team to an 81–80 victory after they trailed 76–68 with 42 seconds remaining.
- The Bulls made their first appearance in the playoffs since their 1998 championship season. The Bulls' postseason berth followed an 0–9 start to the season with the Bulls having one of the youngest rosters in NBA history.
- The Washington Wizards made their first appearance in the playoffs since the team name was changed for the 1997–98 season.
- The Suns started an unofficial league tradition of a mostly exposed hardwood floor, with a darker varnish on the outside of the three-point area. They also put their team's website name on the sideline, which other teams followed suit in the coming seasons. Through the 2010–11 NBA season, all of the teams, save the Oklahoma City Thunder, had placed their team websites on the sidelines.
- The Seattle SuperSonics made the playoffs for the last time as a team from Seattle.
- Ben Gordon won the Sixth Man Award, making him the first rookie to ever win the award.
- The NBA Finals reached seven games for the first time since 1994, when the Houston Rockets faced the New York Knicks.
- On December 18, the Toronto Raptors traded five-time all-star Vince Carter to the New Jersey Nets for Eric Williams, Aaron Williams, Alonzo Mourning and a pair of first-round draft picks. Mourning was bought out of his contract on February 11 and re-signed with the Miami Heat, being paid a second salary, the veteran's minimum.
- Orlando Magic rookie Dwight Howard became the first and only player straight out of high school to start all 82 games in his rookie season. He also became the youngest to average a double-double, the youngest to average 10 rebounds in a season, and the youngest to record at least 20 rebounds in a game. However, Charlotte Bobcats rookie Emeka Okafor won Rookie of the Year that season.
- This was the final season for Reggie Miller, who spent his entire NBA career with the Pacers.
- The Minnesota Timberwolves did not make an appearance in the playoffs, which then started a 13-season playoff drought.
- Toyota became the new official vehicle of the NBA, replacing General Motors, who also lost one division from its lineup. Unlike the GM deal, however, it was restricted to the main brand, and neither Scion nor Lexus was involved.

=== Coaching changes ===
Offseason
Team	2003–04 coach	2004–05 coach
Atlanta Hawks	Terry Stotts	Mike Woodson
Boston Celtics	John Carroll	Doc Rivers
Charlotte Bobcats	Expansion	Bernie Bickerstaff
Golden State Warriors	Eric Musselman	Mike Montgomery
Los Angeles Lakers	Phil Jackson	Rudy Tomjanovich
New Orleans Hornets	Tim Floyd	Byron Scott
Philadelphia 76ers	Chris Ford	Jim O'Brien
Toronto Raptors	Kevin O'Neill	Sam Mitchell
In-season
Team	Outgoing coach	Incoming coach
Cleveland Cavaliers	Paul Silas	Brendan Malone
Dallas Mavericks	Don Nelson	Avery Johnson
Denver Nuggets	Jeff Bzdelik	Michael Cooper
Denver Nuggets	Michael Cooper	George Karl
Los Angeles Lakers	Rudy Tomjanovich	Frank Hamblen
Memphis Grizzlies	Hubie Brown	Lionel Hollins
Memphis Grizzlies	Lionel Hollins	Mike Fratello
Minnesota Timberwolves	Flip Saunders	Kevin McHale
New York Knicks	Lenny Wilkens	Herb Williams
Orlando Magic	Johnny Davis	Chris Jent
Portland Trail Blazers	Maurice Cheeks	Kevin Pritchard

== 2004–05 NBA changes ==
- All teams – Reebok became the exclusive uniform supplier to all 30 NBA teams, following the expiration of Nike's previous contract to a select number of teams.
- Atlanta Hawks – slightly changed their uniforms, from the trim colors of white to red on the road uniforms, added new "ATL" wordmark stamps on the back of the shorts on the road and home uniforms, and added new yellow road alternate uniforms with black side panels to their jerseys and shorts and a "HAWKS" wordmark stamp on the back of the shorts.
- Chicago Bulls – slightly changed their uniforms they added the Bulls secondary logo on the back of the jersey.
- Charlotte Bobcats – newly expansion team added new logo and new uniforms, added dark navy blue, grey and orange to their color scheme, added side panels to their jerseys and shorts.
- Dallas Mavericks – added new green road alternate uniforms with blue side panels to their jerseys and shorts.
- Golden State Warriors – added new orange road alternate uniforms with dark navy blue side panels to their jerseys and shorts.
- Los Angeles Lakers – slightly changed their uniforms added the secondary logo to their shorts.
- Memphis Grizzlies – added new logo and new uniforms replacing teal, brown, red and black and with dark navy blue, yellow and grey to their color scheme, added side panels to their jerseys and shorts, and moved into their new arena the FedExForum.
- New Orleans Hornets – added new yellow alternate road uniforms.
- Portland Trail Blazers – slightly once again changed their primary logo added Trail on their wordmark on the logo.
- Seattle SuperSonics – added new yellow alternate road uniforms.
- Utah Jazz – added new logo and new uniforms, replacing purple, blue and teal with dark navy blue, light blue and purple to their color scheme, added side panels to their jerseys and shorts.

== Final standings ==
=== By division ===
Eastern Conference

Atlantic Division	W	L	PCT	GB	Home	Road	Div
y-Boston Celtics	45	37	.549	–	27–14	18–23	8–8
x-Philadelphia 76ers	43	39	.524	2	25–16	18–23	8–8
x-New Jersey Nets	42	40	.512	3	24–17	18–23	11–5
e-New York Knicks	33	49	.402	12	22–19	11–30	6–10
e-Toronto Raptors	33	49	.402	12	22–19	11–30	7–9

Central Division	W	L	PCT	GB	Home	Road	Div
y-Detroit Pistons	54	28	.659	–	32–9	22–19	8–8
x-Chicago Bulls	47	35	.573	7	27–14	20–21	8–8
x-Indiana Pacers	44	38	.537	10	25–16	19–22	9–7
e-Cleveland Cavaliers	42	40	.512	12	29–12	13–28	7–9
e-Milwaukee Bucks	30	52	.366	24	23–18	7–34	8–8

Southeast Division	W	L	PCT	GB	Home	Road	Div
y-Miami Heat	59	23	.720	–	35–6	24–17	15–1
x-Washington Wizards	45	37	.549	14	29–12	16–25	10–6
e-Orlando Magic	36	46	.439	23	24–17	12–29	6–10
e-Charlotte Bobcats	18	64	.220	41	14–27	4–37	7–9
e-Atlanta Hawks	13	69	.159	46	9–32	4–37	2–14

Western Conference

Northwest Division	W	L	PCT	GB	Home	Road	Div
y-Seattle SuperSonics	52	30	.634	–	26–15	26–15	11–5
x-Denver Nuggets	49	33	.598	3	31–10	18–23	9–7
e-Minnesota Timberwolves	44	38	.537	8	24–17	20–21	10–6
e-Portland Trail Blazers	27	55	.329	25	18–23	9–32	4–12
e-Utah Jazz	26	56	.317	26	18–23	8–33	6–10

Pacific Division	W	L	PCT	GB	Home	Road	Div
y-Phoenix Suns	62	20	.756	–	31–10	31–10	12–4
x-Sacramento Kings	50	32	.610	12	30–11	20–21	10–6
e-Los Angeles Clippers	37	45	.451	25	27–14	10–31	6–10
e-Los Angeles Lakers	34	48	.415	28	22–19	12–29	6–10
e-Golden State Warriors	34	48	.415	28	20–21	14–27	6–10

Southwest Division	W	L	PCT	GB	Home	Road	Div
y-San Antonio Spurs	59	23	.720	–	38–3	21–20	10–6
x-Dallas Mavericks	58	24	.707	1	29–12	29–12	11–5
x-Houston Rockets	51	31	.622	8	26–15	25–16	10–6
x-Memphis Grizzlies	45	37	.549	14	26–15	19–22	7–9
e-New Orleans Hornets	18	64	.220	41	11–30	7–34	2–14

=== By conference ===
Eastern Conference
#	Team	W	L	PCT	GB
1	c-Miami Heat	59	23	.720	–
2	y-Detroit Pistons	54	28	.659	5
3	y-Boston Celtics	45	37	.549	14
4	x-Chicago Bulls	47	35	.573	12
5	x-Washington Wizards	45	37	.549	14
6	x-Indiana Pacers	44	38	.537	15
7	x-Philadelphia 76ers	43	39	.524	16
8	x-New Jersey Nets	42	40	.512	17
9	e-Cleveland Cavaliers	42	40	.512	17
10	e-Orlando Magic	36	46	.439	23
11	e-New York Knicks	33	49	.402	26
12	e-Toronto Raptors	33	49	.402	26
13	e-Milwaukee Bucks	30	52	.366	29
14	e-Charlotte Bobcats	18	64	.220	41
15	e-Atlanta Hawks	13	69	.159	46

#	Western Conference				
#	Team	W	L	PCT	GB
1	z-Phoenix Suns	62	20	.756	—
2	y-San Antonio Spurs	59	23	.720	3
3	y-Seattle SuperSonics	52	30	.634	10
4	x-Dallas Mavericks	58	24	.707	4
5	x-Houston Rockets	51	31	.622	11
6	x-Sacramento Kings	50	32	.610	12
7	x-Denver Nuggets	49	33	.598	13
8	x-Memphis Grizzlies	45	37	.549	17
9	e-Minnesota Timberwolves	44	38	.537	18
10	e-Los Angeles Clippers	37	45	.451	25
11	e-Los Angeles Lakers	34	48	.415	28
12	e-Golden State Warriors	34	48	.415	28
13	e-Portland Trail Blazers	27	55	.329	35
14	e-Utah Jazz	26	56	.317	36
15	e-New Orleans Hornets	18	64	.220	44

Notes

- z – Clinched home court advantage for the entire playoffs
- c – Clinched home court advantage for the conference playoffs
- x – Clinched playoff spot
- y – Clinched division title
- e – Eliminated from playoff contention

== Playoffs ==
Teams in bold advanced to the next round. The numbers to the left of each team indicate the team's seeding in its conference, and the numbers to the right indicate the number of games the team won in that round. The division champions are marked by an asterisk. Home court advantage does not necessarily belong to the higher-seeded team, but instead the team with the better regular season win-loss record; teams enjoying the home advantage are shown in italics.

First Round	Conference Semifinals
**E1**	**Miami***	**4**
E8	New Jersey	0
**E1**	**Miami***	**4**
E5	Washington	0
E4	Chicago	2
**E5**	**Washington**	**4**
**Eastern Conference**
E3	Boston*	3
**E6**	**Indiana**	**4**
E6	Indiana	2
**E2**	**Detroit***	**4**
**E2**	**Detroit***	**4**
E7	Philadelphia	1
**W1**	**Phoenix***	**4**
W8	Memphis	0
**W1**	**Phoenix***	**4**
W4	Dallas	2
**W4**	**Dallas**	**4**
W5	Houston	3
**Western Conference**
**W3**	**Seattle***	**4**
W6	Sacramento	1
W3	Seattle*	2
**W2**	**San Antonio***	**4**
**W2**	**San Antonio***	**4**
W7	Denver	1

Conference Finals
E1	Miami*	3
**E2**	**Detroit***	**4**
W1	Phoenix*	1
**W2**	**San Antonio***	**4**

NBA Finals
E2	Detroit*	3
**W2**	**San Antonio***	**4**

- * Division winner
- **Bold** Series winner
- Italic Team with home-court advantage

== Statistics leaders ==
Category	Player	Team	Stat
Points per game	Allen Iverson	Philadelphia 76ers	30.7
Rebounds per game	Kevin Garnett	Minnesota Timberwolves	13.5
Assists per game	Steve Nash	Phoenix Suns	11.5
Steals per game	Larry Hughes	Washington Wizards	2.89
Blocks per game	Andrei Kirilenko	Utah Jazz	3.32
FG%	Shaquille O'Neal	Miami Heat	.600
FT%	Reggie Miller	Indiana Pacers	.933
3FG%	Fred Hoiberg	Minnesota Timberwolves	.483

== Awards ==
=== Yearly awards ===
- Most Valuable Player: Steve Nash, Phoenix Suns
- Rookie of the Year: Emeka Okafor, Charlotte Bobcats
- Defensive Player of the Year: Ben Wallace, Detroit Pistons
- Sixth Man of the Year: Ben Gordon, Chicago Bulls
- Most Improved Player: Bobby Simmons, Los Angeles Clippers
- Coach of the Year: Mike D'Antoni, Phoenix Suns
- Executive of the Year: Bryan Colangelo, Phoenix Suns
- Sportsmanship Award: Grant Hill, Orlando Magic

- All-NBA First Team:
  - F – Tim Duncan, San Antonio Spurs
  - F – Dirk Nowitzki, Dallas Mavericks
  - C – Shaquille O'Neal, Miami Heat
  - G – Allen Iverson, Philadelphia 76ers
  - G – Steve Nash, Phoenix Suns
- All-NBA Second Team:
  - F – LeBron James, Cleveland Cavaliers
  - F – Kevin Garnett, Minnesota Timberwolves
  - C – Amar'e Stoudemire, Phoenix Suns
  - G – Dwyane Wade, Miami Heat
  - G – Ray Allen, Seattle SuperSonics
- All-NBA Third Team
  - F – Tracy McGrady, Houston Rockets
  - F – Shawn Marion, Phoenix Suns
  - C – Ben Wallace, Detroit Pistons
  - G – Kobe Bryant, Los Angeles Lakers
  - G – Gilbert Arenas, Washington Wizards

- NBA All-Defensive First Team
  - F – Kevin Garnett, Minnesota Timberwolves
  - F – Tim Duncan, San Antonio Spurs
  - C – Ben Wallace, Detroit Pistons
  - G – Bruce Bowen, San Antonio Spurs
  - G – Larry Hughes, Washington Wizards
- NBA All-Defensive Second Team
  - F – Tayshaun Prince, Detroit Pistons
  - F – Andrei Kirilenko, Utah Jazz
  - C – Marcus Camby, Denver Nuggets
  - G – Jason Kidd, New Jersey Nets
  - G – Dwyane Wade, Miami Heat
  - G – Chauncey Billups, Detroit Pistons

- NBA All-Rookie First Team
  - Emeka Okafor, Charlotte Bobcats
  - Dwight Howard, Orlando Magic
  - Ben Gordon, Chicago Bulls
  - Andre Iguodala, Philadelphia 76ers
  - Luol Deng, Chicago Bulls
- All-NBA Rookie Second Team
  - Nenad Krstić, New Jersey Nets
  - Josh Smith, Atlanta Hawks
  - Josh Childress, Atlanta Hawks
  - Jameer Nelson, Orlando Magic
  - Al Jefferson, Boston Celtics

=== Players of the month ===
The following players were named the Eastern and Western Conference Players of the Month.

Month	Eastern Conference	Western Conference
October – November	LeBron James (Cleveland Cavaliers) (1/2)	Steve Nash (Phoenix Suns) (1/1)
December	Dwyane Wade (Miami Heat) (1/1)	Dirk Nowitzki (Dallas Mavericks) (1/2)
January	LeBron James (Cleveland Cavaliers) (2/2)	Chris Webber (Sacramento Kings) (1/1)
February	Vince Carter (New Jersey Nets) (1/1)	Dirk Nowitzki (Dallas Mavericks) (2/2)
March	Shaquille O'Neal (Miami Heat) (1/1)	Kevin Garnett (Minnesota Timberwolves) (1/1)
April	Allen Iverson (Philadelphia 76ers) (1/1)	Amar'e Stoudemire (Phoenix Suns) (1/1)

=== Rookies of the month ===
The following players were named the Eastern and Western Conference Rookies of the Month.

Month	Eastern Conference	Western Conference
October – November	Emeka Okafor (Charlotte Bobcats) (1/3)	Devin Harris (Dallas Mavericks) (1/1)
December	Emeka Okafor (Charlotte Bobcats) (2/3)	Beno Udrih (San Antonio Spurs) (1/1)
January	Ben Gordon (Chicago Bulls) (1/3)	J. R. Smith (New Orleans Hornets) (1/3)
February	Ben Gordon (Chicago Bulls) (2/3)	J. R. Smith (New Orleans Hornets) (2/3)
March	Ben Gordon (Chicago Bulls) (3/3)	J. R. Smith (New Orleans Hornets) (3/3)
April	Emeka Okafor (Charlotte Bobcats) (3/3)	Shaun Livingston (Los Angeles Clippers) (1/1)

=== Coaches of the month ===
The following coaches were named the Eastern and Western Conference Coaches of the Month.

Month	Eastern Conference	Western Conference
October – November	Johnny Davis (Orlando Magic) (1/1)	Nate McMillan (Seattle SuperSonics) (1/1)
December	Stan Van Gundy (Miami Heat) (1/2)	Mike D'Antoni (Phoenix Suns) (1/1)
January	Scott Skiles (Chicago Bulls) (1/1)	Mike Fratello (Memphis Grizzlies) (1/1)
February	Larry Brown (Detroit Pistons) (1/1)	George Karl (Denver Nuggets) (1/2)
March	Stan Van Gundy (Miami Heat) (2/2)	George Karl (Denver Nuggets) (2/2)
April	Lawrence Frank (New Jersey Nets) (1/1)	Avery Johnson (Dallas Mavericks) (1/1)

== See also ==
- List of NBA regular season records
