= Southeast Division (NBA) =

Division in the National Basketball Association

- Conference: Eastern Conference
- League: National Basketball Association
- Sport: Basketball
- First season: 2004–05 season
- No. of teams: 5
- Most recent champion: Atlanta Hawks (3rd title) (2025–26)
- Most titles: Miami Heat (12 titles)

Southeast Division Teams Location

The Southeast Division is one of the three divisions in the Eastern Conference of the National Basketball Association (NBA). The division consists of five teams: the Atlanta Hawks, the Charlotte Hornets, the Miami Heat, the Orlando Magic and the Washington Wizards.

The division was created at the start of the 2004–05 season, when the league expanded from 29 to 30 teams with the addition of the Charlotte Bobcats. The league realigned itself into three divisions in each conference. The Southeast Division began with five inaugural members, the Hawks, the Bobcats, the Heat, the Magic and the Wizards. The Hawks joined from the Central Division, while the Heat, the Magic and the Wizards joined from the Atlantic Division. The Bobcats changed their name to the Hornets effective with the 2014–15 season, after which it assumed the history of the original Hornets from 1988 to 2002. The Hornets name was previously used by the now-New Orleans Pelicans from 2002 to 2013.

The Heat have won the most Southeast Division titles with 12, while the Magic have won six, the Hawks have won three and the Wizards have won one. The Heat won the Southeast Division in four consecutive seasons from 2011 to 2014, a record to this day. Miami's three championships (2006, 2012, and 2013) each came after winning the Southeast Division. The current division champions are the Atlanta Hawks. From 2004 through 2014, Florida's two state-based franchises, Miami and Orlando, won a combined ten straight division championships, a streak that was finally broken after Atlanta won with 60 wins in the 2015 season. Twice, in 2010 and 2014, four of five teams in the division made up half of the eight playoff teams in the postseasons of those two years.

Since the 2021–22 season, the Southeast Division champion has received the Earl Lloyd Trophy, named after Hall of Famer Earl Lloyd.

== 2026–27 standings ==
Southeast Division	W	L	PCT	GB	Home	Road	Div	GP
Atlanta Hawks	1	0	1.000	–	0‍–‍0	1‍–‍0	1–0	1
Washington Wizards	1	0	1.000	–	1‍–‍0	0‍–‍0	1–0	1
Charlotte Hornets	1	0	1.000	–	0‍–‍0	1‍–‍0	0–0	1
Orlando Magic	0	1	.000	1.0	0‍–‍1	0‍–‍0	0–1	1
Miami Heat	0	1	.000	1.0	0‍–‍0	0‍–‍1	0–0	1

== Teams ==
Team	City	Year	From
Team	City	Joined	
Atlanta Hawks	Atlanta, Georgia	2004	Central Division
Charlotte Hornets (1988–2002; 2014–present); Charlotte Bobcats (2004–2014)	Charlotte, North Carolina	2004	—†
Miami Heat	Miami, Florida	2004	Atlantic Division
Orlando Magic	Orlando, Florida	2004	Atlantic Division
Washington Wizards	Washington, D.C.	2004	Atlantic Division

Notes

- † denotes an expansion team.

== Earl Lloyd Trophy ==
Beginning with the 2021–22 season, the Southeast Division champion has received the Earl Lloyd Trophy. As with the other division championship trophies, it is named after one of the African American pioneers from NBA history. Earl Lloyd became the first African American to play in an NBA game, debuting for the Washington Capitols on October 31, 1950. The Lloyd Trophy consists of a 200-millimetre (7.9 in) crystal ball.

== Division champions ==
^	Had or tied for the best regular season record for that season

Season	Team	Record	Playoffs result
2004–05	Miami Heat	59–23 (.720)	Lost conference finals
2005–06	Miami Heat	52–30 (.634)	Won NBA Finals
2006–07	Miami Heat	44–38 (.537)	Lost first round
2007–08	Orlando Magic	52–30 (.634)	Lost conference semifinals
2008–09	Orlando Magic	59–23 (.720)	Lost NBA Finals
2009–10	Orlando Magic	59–23 (.720)	Lost conference finals
2010–11	Miami Heat	58–24 (.707)	Lost NBA Finals
2011–12^{[a]}	Miami Heat	46–20 (.697)	Won NBA Finals
2012–13	Miami Heat^	66–16 (.805)	Won NBA Finals
2013–14	Miami Heat	54–28 (.659)	Lost NBA Finals
2014–15	Atlanta Hawks	60–22 (.732)	Lost conference finals
2015–16	Miami Heat	48–34 (.585)	Lost conference semifinals
2016–17	Washington Wizards	49–33 (.598)	Lost conference semifinals
2017–18	Miami Heat	44–38 (.537)	Lost first round
2018–19	Orlando Magic	42–40 (.512)	Lost first round
2019–20	Miami Heat	44–29 (.603)	Lost NBA Finals
2020–21	Atlanta Hawks	41–31 (.569)	Lost conference finals
2021–22	Miami Heat	53–29 (.646)	Lost conference finals
2022–23	Miami Heat	44–38 (.537)	Lost NBA Finals
2023–24	Orlando Magic	47–35 (.573)	Lost first round
2024–25	Orlando Magic	41–41 (.500)	Lost first round
2025–26	Atlanta Hawks	46–36 (.561)	Lost first round

=== Titles by team ===
Team	Titles	Season(s) won
Miami Heat	12	2004–05, 2005–06, 2006–07, 2010–11, 2011–12, 2012–13, 2013–14, 2015–16, 2017–18, 2019–20, 2021–22, 2022–23
Orlando Magic	6	2007–08, 2008–09, 2009–10, 2018–19, 2023–24, 2024–25
Atlanta Hawks	3	2014–15, 2020–21, 2025–26
Washington Wizards	1	2016–17
Charlotte Hornets	0	

== Season results ==
^	Denotes team that won the NBA championship
^{+}	Denotes team that won the Conference finals, but lost the NBA Finals
*	Denotes team that qualified for the NBA Playoffs
×	Denotes team that qualified for the NBA play-in tournament

†	Denotes team that did not qualify for the 2020 NBA Bubble season restart

Season	Team (record)				
Season	1st	2nd	3rd	4th	5th
2004: The Southeast Division was formed with five inaugural members. An expansion team, the Charlotte Bobcats, joined the division. The Atlanta Hawks joined from the Central Division, while the Miami Heat, the Orlando Magic and the Washington Wizards joined from the Atlantic Division.
2004–05	Miami* (59–23)	Washington* (45–37)	Orlando (36–46)	Charlotte (18–64)	Atlanta (13–69)
2005–06	Miami^ (52–30)	Washington* (42–40)	Orlando (36–46)	Charlotte (26–56)	Atlanta (26–56)
2006–07	Miami* (44–38)	Washington* (41–41)	Orlando* (40–42)	Charlotte (33–49)	Atlanta (30–52)
2007–08	Orlando* (52–30)	Washington* (43–39)	Atlanta* (37–45)	Charlotte (32–50)	Miami (15–67)
2008–09	Orlando^{+} (59–23)	Atlanta* (47–35)	Miami* (43–39)	Charlotte (35–47)	Washington (19–63)
2009–10	Orlando* (59–23)	Atlanta* (53–29)	Miami* (47–35)	Charlotte* (44–38)	Washington (26–56)
2010–11	Miami^{+} (58–24)	Orlando* (52–30)	Atlanta* (44–38)	Charlotte (34–48)	Washington (23–59)
2011–12^{[a]}	Miami^ (46–20)	Atlanta* (40–26)	Orlando* (37–29)	Washington (20–46)	Charlotte (7–59)
2012–13	Miami^ (66–16)	Atlanta* (44–38)	Washington (29–53)	Charlotte (21–61)	Orlando (20–62)
2013–14	Miami^{+} (54–28)	Washington* (44–38)	Charlotte* (43–39)	Atlanta* (38–44)	Orlando (23–59)
2014: The Charlotte Bobcats were renamed Charlotte Hornets, and acquired the history and records of the original Charlotte Hornets (1988–2002) from the New Orleans Pelicans.
2014–15	Atlanta* (60–22)	Washington* (46–36)	Miami (35–47)	Charlotte (33–49)	Orlando (25–57)
2015–16	Miami* (48–34)	Atlanta* (48–34)	Charlotte* (48–34)	Washington (41–41)	Orlando (35–47)
2016–17	Washington* (49–33)	Atlanta* (43–39)	Miami (41–41)	Charlotte (36–46)	Orlando (29–53)
2017–18	Miami* (44–38)	Washington* (43–39)	Charlotte (36–46)	Orlando (25–57)	Atlanta (24–58)
2018–19	Orlando* (42–40)	Charlotte (39–43)	Miami (39–43)	Washington (32–50)	Atlanta (29–53)
2019–20	Miami^{+} (44–29)	Orlando* (33–40)	Charlotte† (23–42)	Washington (25–47)	Atlanta† (20–47)
2020–21	Atlanta* (41–31)	Miami* (40–32)	Washington* (34–38)	Charlotte× (33–39)	Orlando (21–51)
2021–22	Miami* (53–29)	Atlanta* (43–39)	Charlotte× (43–39)	Washington (35–47)	Orlando (22–60)
2022–23	Miami^{+} (44–38)	Atlanta* (41–41)	Washington (35–47)	Orlando (34–48)	Charlotte (27–55)
2023–24	Orlando* (47–35)	Miami* (46–36)	Atlanta× (36–46)	Charlotte (21–61)	Washington (15–67)
2024–25	Orlando* (41–41)	Atlanta× (40–42)	Miami* (37–45)	Charlotte (19–63)	Washington (18–64)
2025–26	Atlanta* (46–36)	Orlando* (45–37)	Charlotte× (44–38)	Miami× (43–39)	Washington (17–65)

== Notes ==
- ^{a 1} ^{2} Because of a lockout, the season did not start until December 25, 2011, and all 30 teams played a shortened 66-game regular season schedule.
