= 2004–05 Washington Wizards season =

NBA professional basketball team season

- Head coach: Eddie Jordan
- Arena: MCI Center

Results
- Record: 45–37 (.549)
- Place: Division: 2nd (Southeast); Conference: 5th (Eastern)
- Playoff finish: Conference Semifinals (lost to Heat 0–4)

The 2004–05 Washington Wizards season was the Wizards 44th season in the National Basketball Association, and their 32nd season in the city of Washington, D.C. During the offseason, the Wizards acquired Antawn Jamison from the Dallas Mavericks. The Wizards got off to a decent start and played above .500 for the entire season. The Wizards posted a 20-win improvement over the previous season, finishing second in the Southeast Division with a 45–37 record, and made it back to the playoffs for the first time since 1997, back when they were known as the "Bullets". Gilbert Arenas averaged 25.5 points per game and was selected along with Jamison for the 2005 NBA All-Star Game. In the first round of the playoffs, the Wizards defeated the Chicago Bulls in six games after losing the first two games, winning their first playoff series since 1982, but were swept in the semi-finals by the Miami Heat in four straight games. This was the final full-season at MCI Center, which was rebranded as Verizon Center in January 2006. Following the season, Larry Hughes signed as a free agent with the Cleveland Cavaliers, and Kwame Brown was traded to the Los Angeles Lakers.

== Draft picks ==
| Round | Pick | Player | Position | Nationality | College |
|---|---|---|---|---|---|
| 1 | 5 | Devin Harris | PG | United States | Wisconsin |
| 2 | 32 | Peter John Ramos | C | Puerto Rico | |

== Roster ==
2004-05 Washington Wizards roster
Players

| Pos. | No. | Player | Height | Weight | DOB | From |
|---|---|---|---|---|---|---|
| PG | 0 | Gilbert Arenas | 6 ft 4 in (1.93 m) | 215 lb (98 kg) | 1982-01-06 | Arizona |
| PG | 2 | Steve Blake | 6 ft 3 in (1.91 m) | 172 lb (78 kg) | 1980-02-26 | Maryland |
| SF | 10 | Damone Brown | 6 ft 9 in (2.06 m) | 200 lb (91 kg) | 1979-06-28 | Syracuse |
| PF | 5 | Kwame Brown | 6 ft 11 in (2.11 m) | 270 lb (122 kg) | 1982-03-10 | Glynn Academy HS |
| SG | 3 | Juan Dixon | 6 ft 3 in (1.91 m) | 174 lb (79 kg) | 1978-10-09 | Maryland |
| SF | 24 | Jarvis Hayes | 6 ft 7 in (2.01 m) | 220 lb (100 kg) | 1981-08-09 | Georgia |
| C | 33 | Brendan Haywood | 7 ft 0 in (2.13 m) | 268 lb (122 kg) | 1979-11-27 | North Carolina |
| SG | 20 | Larry Hughes | 6 ft 5 in (1.96 m) | 184 lb (83 kg) | 1979-01-23 | Saint Louis |
| PF | 4 | Antawn Jamison | 6 ft 9 in (2.06 m) | 235 lb (107 kg) | 1976-06-12 | North Carolina |
| SF | 1 | Jared Jeffries | 6 ft 11 in (2.11 m) | 230 lb (104 kg) | 1981-11-25 | Indiana |
| SG | 8 | Anthony Peeler | 6 ft 4 in (1.93 m) | 208 lb (94 kg) | 1969-11-25 | Missouri |
| SF | 7 | Laron Profit | 6 ft 5 in (1.96 m) | 204 lb (93 kg) | 1977-08-05 | Maryland |
| C | 34 | Peter John Ramos | 7 ft 3 in (2.21 m) | 275 lb (125 kg) | 1985-05-13 | Puerto Rico |
| C | 51 | Michael Ruffin | 6 ft 9 in (2.06 m) | 246 lb (112 kg) | 1977-01-21 | Tulsa |
| C | 36 | Etan Thomas | 6 ft 10 in (2.08 m) | 260 lb (118 kg) | 1978-04-01 | Syracuse |
| PF | 52 | Samaki Walker | 6 ft 9 in (2.06 m) | 240 lb (109 kg) | 1976-02-25 | Louisville |

Coaches
Head coach
- Eddie Jordan
Assistant(s)
- Phil Hubbard
- Mike O'Koren
- Tom Young
- Eric Waters (trainer)

Legend
- (DP) Unsigned draft pick
- (FA) Free agent
- (S) Suspended
- Injured

== Regular season ==
=== Standings ===
| Southeast Division | W | L | PCT | GB | Home | Road | Div |
|---|---|---|---|---|---|---|---|
| y-Miami Heat | 59 | 23 | .720 | – | 35–6 | 24–17 | 15–1 |
| x-Washington Wizards | 45 | 37 | .549 | 14 | 29–12 | 16–25 | 10–6 |
| e-Orlando Magic | 36 | 46 | .439 | 23 | 24–17 | 12–29 | 6–10 |
| e-Charlotte Bobcats | 18 | 64 | .220 | 41 | 14–27 | 4–37 | 7–9 |
| e-Atlanta Hawks | 13 | 69 | .159 | 46 | 9–32 | 4–37 | 2–14 |

Eastern Conference
| # | Team | W | L | PCT | GB |
|---|---|---|---|---|---|
| 1 | c-Miami Heat | 59 | 23 | .720 | – |
| 2 | y-Detroit Pistons | 54 | 28 | .659 | 5 |
| 3 | y-Boston Celtics | 45 | 37 | .549 | 14 |
| 4 | x-Chicago Bulls | 47 | 35 | .573 | 12 |
| 5 | x-Washington Wizards | 45 | 37 | .549 | 14 |
| 6 | x-Indiana Pacers | 44 | 38 | .537 | 15 |
| 7 | x-Philadelphia 76ers | 43 | 39 | .524 | 16 |
| 8 | x-New Jersey Nets | 42 | 40 | .512 | 17 |
| 9 | e-Cleveland Cavaliers | 42 | 40 | .512 | 17 |
| 10 | e-Orlando Magic | 36 | 46 | .439 | 23 |
| 11 | e-New York Knicks | 33 | 49 | .402 | 26 |
| 12 | e-Toronto Raptors | 33 | 49 | .402 | 26 |
| 13 | e-Milwaukee Bucks | 30 | 52 | .366 | 29 |
| 14 | e-Charlotte Bobcats | 18 | 64 | .220 | 41 |
| 15 | e-Atlanta Hawks | 13 | 69 | .159 | 46 |

== Playoffs ==
2005 playoff game log
First Round: 4–2 (home: 3–0; road: 1–2)

| Game | Date | Team | Score | High points | High rebounds | High assists | Location Attendance | Series |
|---|---|---|---|---|---|---|---|---|
| 1 | April 24 | @ Chicago | L 94–103 | Larry Hughes (31) | Kwame Brown (9) | Gilbert Arenas (8) | United Center; 22,655 | 0–1 |
| 2 | April 27 | @ Chicago | L 103–113 | Gilbert Arenas (39) | Larry Hughes (10) | Larry Hughes (5) | United Center; 22,605 | 0–2 |
| 3 | April 30 | Chicago | W 117–99 | Gilbert Arenas (22) | Haywood, Thomas (9) | Gilbert Arenas (7) | MCI Center; 20,173 | 1–2 |
| 4 | May 2 | Chicago | W 106–99 | Juan Dixon (35) | Etan Thomas (9) | Gilbert Arenas (5) | MCI Center; 20,173 | 2–2 |
| 5 | May 4 | @ Chicago | W 112–110 | Larry Hughes (33) | Antawn Jamison (10) | Gilbert Arenas (8) | United Center; 22,250 | 3–2 |
| 6 | May 6 | Chicago | W 94–91 | Larry Hughes (21) | Ruffin, Haywood (8) | Gilbert Arenas (7) | MCI Center; 20,173 | 4–2 |

Conference Semifinals: 0–4 (home: 0–2; road: 0–2)

| Game | Date | Team | Score | High points | High rebounds | High assists | Location Attendance | Series |
|---|---|---|---|---|---|---|---|---|
| 1 | May 8 | @ Miami | L 86–105 | Gilbert Arenas (25) | Antawn Jamison (8) | Larry Hughes (3) | American Airlines Arena; 20,151 | 0–1 |
| 2 | May 10 | @ Miami | L 102–108 | Antawn Jamison (32) | Hughes, Ruffin (8) | Gilbert Arenas (5) | American Airlines Arena; 20,205 | 0–2 |
| 3 | May 12 | Miami | L 95–102 | Antawn Jamison (21) | Brendan Haywood (8) | Gilbert Arenas (14) | MCI Center; 20,173 | 0–3 |
| 4 | May 14 | Miami | L 95–99 | Gilbert Arenas (25) | Brendan Haywood (15) | Larry Hughes (5) | MCI Center; 20,173 | 0–4 |

2005 schedule

== Player statistics ==
=== Season ===
| Player | GP | GS | MPG | FG | FGA | FG% | 3P | 3PA | 3P% | FT | FTA | FT% | OPG | DPG | TRB | AST | STL | BLK | TOV | PF | PPG |
|---|---|---|---|---|---|---|---|---|---|---|---|---|---|---|---|---|---|---|---|---|---|
| Gilbert Arenas | 80 | 80 | 3274 | 656 | 1523 | .431 | 205 | 562 | .365 | 521 | 640 | .814 | 83 | 295 | 378 | 411 | 139 | 23 | 242 | 245 | 2038 |
| Larry Hughes | 61 | 61 | 2358 | 467 | 1086 | .430 | 59 | 209 | .282 | 352 | 453 | .777 | 74 | 308 | 382 | 285 | 176 | 18 | 153 | 168 | 1345 |
| Antawn Jamison | 68 | 68 | 2605 | 519 | 1189 | .437 | 71 | 208 | .341 | 225 | 296 | .760 | 160 | 359 | 519 | 154 | 55 | 16 | 118 | 151 | 1334 |
| Brendan Haywood | 68 | 68 | 1865 | 239 | 427 | .560 | 0 | 0 | | 159 | 261 | .609 | 202 | 262 | 464 | 57 | 52 | 114 | 96 | 218 | 637 |
| Jarvis Hayes | 54 | 22 | 1560 | 206 | 530 | .389 | 42 | 123 | .341 | 99 | 118 | .839 | 41 | 186 | 227 | 90 | 49 | 9 | 62 | 107 | 553 |
| Jared Jeffries | 77 | 71 | 2007 | 203 | 434 | .468 | 16 | 51 | .314 | 101 | 173 | .584 | 152 | 222 | 374 | 151 | 66 | 35 | 114 | 206 | 523 |
| Juan Dixon | 63 | 4 | 1054 | 186 | 447 | .416 | 48 | 147 | .327 | 87 | 97 | .897 | 32 | 87 | 119 | 111 | 43 | 4 | 68 | 98 | 507 |
| Etan Thomas | 47 | 10 | 976 | 128 | 255 | .502 | 0 | 0 | | 76 | 144 | .528 | 85 | 159 | 244 | 20 | 17 | 51 | 50 | 133 | 332 |
| Kwame Brown | 42 | 14 | 908 | 109 | 237 | .460 | 0 | 0 | | 74 | 129 | .574 | 72 | 134 | 206 | 39 | 25 | 15 | 67 | 112 | 292 |
| Steve Blake | 44 | 1 | 648 | 61 | 186 | .328 | 36 | 93 | .387 | 33 | 41 | .805 | 18 | 53 | 71 | 69 | 13 | 0 | 39 | 47 | 191 |
| Anthony Peeler | 40 | 0 | 529 | 56 | 150 | .373 | 25 | 65 | .385 | 16 | 18 | .889 | 14 | 51 | 65 | 57 | 18 | 2 | 28 | 39 | 153 |
| Laron Profit | 42 | 4 | 428 | 56 | 128 | .438 | 8 | 28 | .286 | 16 | 25 | .640 | 24 | 52 | 76 | 37 | 16 | 5 | 27 | 44 | 136 |
| Michael Ruffin | 79 | 7 | 1262 | 41 | 99 | .414 | 0 | 1 | .000 | 29 | 67 | .433 | 157 | 175 | 332 | 64 | 43 | 41 | 44 | 193 | 111 |
| Damone Brown | 14 | 0 | 152 | 23 | 62 | .371 | 4 | 11 | .364 | 4 | 9 | .444 | 10 | 18 | 28 | 14 | 1 | 6 | 15 | 17 | 54 |
| Samaki Walker | 14 | 0 | 134 | 11 | 31 | .355 | 0 | 0 | | 2 | 3 | .667 | 8 | 10 | 18 | 4 | 3 | 7 | 8 | 25 | 24 |
| Peter John Ramos | 6 | 0 | 20 | 5 | 10 | .500 | 0 | 0 | | 1 | 2 | .500 | 1 | 3 | 4 | 0 | 0 | 1 | 3 | 4 | 11 |

=== Playoffs ===
| Player | GP | GS | MPG | FG | FGA | FG% | 3P | 3PA | 3P% | FT | FTA | FT% | OPG | DPG | TRB | AST | STL | BLK | TOV | PF | PPG |
|---|---|---|---|---|---|---|---|---|---|---|---|---|---|---|---|---|---|---|---|---|---|
| Gilbert Arenas | 10 | 10 | 450 | 73 | 194 | .376 | 18 | 77 | .234 | 72 | 94 | .766 | 8 | 44 | 52 | 62 | 21 | 6 | 39 | 34 | 236 |
| Larry Hughes | 10 | 10 | 401 | 68 | 181 | .376 | 7 | 33 | .212 | 64 | 77 | .831 | 17 | 54 | 71 | 37 | 20 | 7 | 25 | 35 | 207 |
| Antawn Jamison | 10 | 10 | 380 | 73 | 162 | .451 | 17 | 34 | .500 | 22 | 32 | .688 | 16 | 47 | 63 | 12 | 7 | 4 | 16 | 24 | 185 |
| Juan Dixon | 10 | 0 | 219 | 41 | 101 | .406 | 11 | 34 | .324 | 21 | 25 | .840 | 3 | 23 | 26 | 13 | 7 | 0 | 12 | 19 | 114 |
| Brendan Haywood | 10 | 10 | 296 | 39 | 72 | .542 | 0 | 0 | | 28 | 44 | .636 | 35 | 41 | 76 | 10 | 14 | 20 | 10 | 40 | 106 |
| Jared Jeffries | 10 | 10 | 247 | 24 | 49 | .490 | 3 | 6 | .500 | 13 | 17 | .765 | 19 | 22 | 41 | 18 | 9 | 9 | 13 | 34 | 64 |
| Etan Thomas | 8 | 0 | 126 | 19 | 29 | .655 | 0 | 0 | | 10 | 22 | .455 | 12 | 24 | 36 | 2 | 0 | 7 | 9 | 23 | 48 |
| Michael Ruffin | 9 | 0 | 156 | 7 | 10 | .700 | 0 | 0 | | 9 | 16 | .563 | 15 | 22 | 37 | 9 | 3 | 3 | 4 | 33 | 23 |
| Kwame Brown | 3 | 0 | 60 | 5 | 13 | .385 | 0 | 0 | | 5 | 9 | .556 | 4 | 11 | 15 | 3 | 0 | 2 | 2 | 5 | 15 |
| Anthony Peeler | 7 | 0 | 43 | 1 | 9 | .111 | 0 | 3 | .000 | 2 | 2 | 1.000 | 0 | 7 | 7 | 3 | 1 | 0 | 3 | 4 | 4 |
| Steve Blake | 4 | 0 | 17 | 1 | 4 | .250 | 0 | 1 | .000 | 0 | 0 | | 0 | 3 | 3 | 2 | 0 | 0 | 1 | 3 | 2 |
| Laron Profit | 3 | 0 | 5 | 0 | 2 | .000 | 0 | 0 | | 0 | 0 | | 0 | 1 | 1 | 1 | 0 | 0 | 0 | 0 | 0 |

== Awards and records ==
- Gilbert Arenas, All-NBA Third Team
- Larry Hughes, NBA All-Defensive First Team

== Transactions ==
Transactions listed are from July 1, 2004, to June 30, 2005.

- July 29, 2004- Signed Anthony Peeler as a free agent.
- August 2, 2004- Signed Michael Ruffin as a free agent.
- August 4, 2004- Signed Samaki Walker as a free agent.
- October 1, 2004- Signed Laron Profit as a free agent. Signed Gerald Fitch as a free agent. Signed Billy Thomas as a free agent.
- October 30, 2004- Waived Billy Thomas. Waived Gerald Fitch.
- March 17, 2005- Signed Damone Brown to two 10-day contracts, then signed to a contract for the rest of the season.
- March 18, 2005- Released Samaki Walker.
- June 28, 2005- Drafted Andray Blatche in the 2nd round (49th pick) of the 2005 NBA Draft.
