= 2004–05 Milwaukee Bucks season =

NBA professional basketball team season

- Head coach: Terry Porter
- Owners: Herb Kohl
- Arena: Bradley Center

Results
- Record: 30–52 (.366)
- Place: Division: 5th Conference: 13th
- Playoff finish: Did not qualify
- Stats at Basketball Reference

The 2004–05 Milwaukee Bucks season was the Bucks' 37th season in the National Basketball Association. During the offseason, the Bucks signed free agents Mike James and second-year guard Mo Williams, while acquiring Zaza Pachulia from the expansion Charlotte Bobcats. Injuries hampered the Bucks from the start as a second-year guard T. J. Ford was lost for the entire season due to a neck injury. The Bucks would get off to a sluggish start losing 16 of their first 22 games. At midseason, the team traded Keith Van Horn to the Dallas Mavericks, and dealt James to the Houston Rockets. They lost 15 of their final 18 games including an 8-game losing streak, finishing in last place in the Central Division with a 30–52 record. The only bright spot came from Michael Redd, who averaged a team-high of 23.0 points per game. Following the season, head coach Terry Porter was fired, and Pachulia signed as a free agent with the Atlanta Hawks.

== Draft picks ==
The Bucks had no draft picks in 2004.

== Roster ==
2004–05 Milwaukee Bucks roster
Players

Pos.	No.	Player	Height	Weight	DOB	From
F/C	52	Calvin Booth	6 ft 11 in (2.11 m)	250 lb (113 kg)		Penn State
F	21	Marcus Fizer	6 ft 8 in (2.03 m)	265 lb (120 kg)		Iowa State
G	11	T. J. Ford (injured) (IN)	6 ft 0 in (1.83 m)	165 lb (75 kg)		Texas
C	50	Dan Gadzuric	6 ft 11 in (2.11 m)	240 lb (109 kg)		UCLA
PG	34	Reece Gaines	6 ft 6 in (1.98 m)	205 lb (93 kg)		Louisville
PG	5	Anthony Goldwire	6 ft 1 in (1.85 m)	182 lb (83 kg)		Houston
SF	7	Toni Kukoč	6 ft 11 in (2.11 m)	235 lb (107 kg)		Croatia
G/F	24	Desmond Mason	6 ft 5 in (1.96 m)	222 lb (101 kg)		Oklahoma State
C	27	Zaza Pachulia	6 ft 11 in (2.11 m)	275 lb (125 kg)		Republic of Georgia
SG	22	Michael Redd	6 ft 6 in (1.98 m)	215 lb (98 kg)		Ohio State
C	15	Daniel Santiago	7 ft 1 in (2.16 m)	260 lb (118 kg)		Saint Vincent
PF	8	Joe Smith	6 ft 10 in (2.08 m)	225 lb (102 kg)		Maryland
G	20	Erick Strickland	6 ft 3 in (1.91 m)	210 lb (95 kg)		Nebraska
PG	25	Mo Williams	6 ft 1 in (1.85 m)	198 lb (90 kg)		Alabama

Coaches
Head coach
- Terry Porter (UW–Stevens Point)
Assistant(s)
- Bob Ociepka (Quincy)

Legend
- (DP) Unsigned draft pick
- (FA) Free agent
- (S) Suspended
- Injured

Roster

=== Roster Notes ===
- Point guard T. J. Ford missed the entire season due to a neck injury.

== Regular season ==
=== Season standings ===
Central Division	W	L	PCT	GB	Home	Road	Div
y-Detroit Pistons	54	28	.659	–	32–9	22–19	8–8
x-Chicago Bulls	47	35	.573	7	27–14	20–21	8–8
x-Indiana Pacers	44	38	.537	10	25–16	19–22	9–7
e-Cleveland Cavaliers	42	40	.512	12	29–12	13–28	7–9
e-Milwaukee Bucks	30	52	.366	24	23–18	7–34	8–8

Eastern Conference
#	Team	W	L	PCT	GB
1	c-Miami Heat	59	23	.720	–
2	y-Detroit Pistons	54	28	.659	5
3	y-Boston Celtics	45	37	.549	14
4	x-Chicago Bulls	47	35	.573	12
5	x-Washington Wizards	45	37	.549	14
6	x-Indiana Pacers	44	38	.537	15
7	x-Philadelphia 76ers	43	39	.524	16
8	x-New Jersey Nets	42	40	.512	17
9	e-Cleveland Cavaliers	42	40	.512	17
10	e-Orlando Magic	36	46	.439	23
11	e-New York Knicks	33	49	.402	26
12	e-Toronto Raptors	33	49	.402	26
13	e-Milwaukee Bucks	30	52	.366	29
14	e-Charlotte Bobcats	18	64	.220	41
15	e-Atlanta Hawks	13	69	.159	46

z - clinched division title
y - clinched division title
x - clinched playoff spot

=== Game log ===
2004–05 game log
Total: 30–52 (Home: 0–0; Road: 0–0)
November: 0–0 (home: 0–0; road: 0–0)

Game	Date	Team	Score	High points	High rebounds	High assists	Location Attendance	Record

December: 0–0 (home: 0–0; road: 0–0)

Game	Date	Team	Score	High points	High rebounds	High assists	Location Attendance	Record

January: 0–0 (home: 0–0; road: 0–0)

Game	Date	Team	Score	High points	High rebounds	High assists	Location Attendance	Record

February: 0–0 (home: 0–0; road: 0–0)

Game	Date	Team	Score	High points	High rebounds	High assists	Location Attendance	Record

March: 0–0 (home: 0–0; road: 0–0)

Game	Date	Team	Score	High points	High rebounds	High assists	Location Attendance	Record

April: 0–0 (home: 0–0; road: 0–0)

Game	Date	Team	Score	High points	High rebounds	High assists	Location Attendance	Record

2004–05 schedule

== Playoffs ==
The Bucks failed to qualify for the playoffs for the first time since 2002.

== Player statistics ==
Legend
GP	Games played	GS	Games started	MPG	Minutes per game
FG%	Field-goal percentage	3P%	3-point field-goal percentage	FT%	Free-throw percentage
RPG	Rebounds per game	APG	Assists per game	SPG	Steals per game
BPG	Blocks per game	PPG	Points per game

Player	GP	GS	MPG	FG%	3FG%	FT%	RPG	APG	SPG	BPG	PPG
Michael Redd	75	75	38.0	44.1	35.5	85.4	4.2	2.3	0.8	0.1	23.0
Desmond Mason	80	71	36.2	44.3	12.5	80.2	3.9	2.7	0.7	0.3	17.2
Mike James	47	0	24.8	44.6	38.2	74.4	2.6	3.9	0.9	0.1	11.4
Joe Smith	74	73	30.6	51.4	0.0	76.8	7.3	0.9	0.6	0.5	11.0
Keith Van Horn	33	13	24.8	44.9	38.5	86.2	5.0	1.2	0.6	0.3	10.4
Mo Williams	80	80	28.2	43.8	32.3	85.0	3.1	6.1	0.9	0.1	10.2
Dan Gadzuric	81	81	22.0	53.9	0.0	53.8	8.3	0.4	0.6	1.3	7.3
Anthony Goldwire	24	2	20.1	43.8	40.8	82.6	2.1	3.3	0.6	0.0	6.4
Zaza Pachulia	74	4	18.9	45.2	0.0	74.6	5.1	0.8	0.6	0.5	6.2
Marcus Fizer	54	0	16.7	45.5	0.0	68.0	3.2	1.2	0.5	0.2	6.2
Kendall Gill	14	0	20.3	40.0	33.3	90.0	2.6	1.9	1.0	0.3	6.1
Toni Kukoč	53	6	20.7	41.0	36.2	72.1	3.0	3.0	0.7	0.2	5.6
Erick Strickland	62	5	16.4	37.5	25.3	81.3	1.7	1.9	0.5	0.0	4.9
Zendon Hamilton	16	0	9.9	34.4	0.0	60.4	2.6	0.4	0.3	0.1	3.2
Eddie House	5	0	8.2	35.3	66.7	0.0	0.6	1.0	0.4	0.0	3.2
Calvin Booth	17	0	11.1	51.7	0.0	75.0	2.9	0.2	0.2	0.7	2.5
Daniel Santiago	11	0	9.5	33.3	0.0	72.7	1.7	0.1	0.3	0.4	2.0
Reece Gaines	11	0	7.2	30.4	50.0	0.0	0.3	0.4	0.2	0.1	1.4

== Transactions ==
=== Trades ===
June 23, 2004
To Milwaukee Bucks
- Zaza Pachulia
To Charlotte Bobcats
- 2nd round draft pick (Bernard Robinson)
February 25, 2005
To Milwaukee Bucks----
- Calvin Booth
- Alvin Henderson
To Dallas Mavericks----
- Keith Van Horn
February 25, 2005
To Milwaukee Bucks----
- Reece Gaines
To Houston Rockets----
- Zendon Hamilton
- Mike James

=== Free agents ===
Player	Signed	Former team
Mike James	August 5, 2004	Detroit Pistons
Mo Williams	August 21, 2004	Utah Jazz
Marcus Fizer	November 4, 2004	Charlotte Bobcats

== See also ==
- 2004-05 NBA season
