= 2004–05 New Jersey Nets season =

NBA professional basketball team season

- Head coach: Lawrence Frank
- President: Rod Thorn
- General manager: Ed Stefanski
- Owner: Bruce Ratner
- Arena: Continental Airlines Arena

Results
- Record: 42–40 (.512)
- Place: Division: 3rd (Atlantic); Conference: 8th (Eastern)
- Playoff finish: First round (lost to Heat 0–4)
- Stats at Basketball Reference

The 2004–05 New Jersey Nets season was the Nets' 38th season in the National Basketball Association, and 29th season in East Rutherford, New Jersey. Without Kenyon Martin, who was traded to the Denver Nuggets in the offseason, the Nets stumbled out of the gate losing 11 of their first 13 games including a nine-game losing streak, as Jason Kidd missed the first month of the season from offseason knee surgery. In December, the Nets made a move acquiring All-Star guard Vince Carter from the Toronto Raptors in a trade for Alonzo Mourning, Eric Williams, and Aaron Williams. Mourning did not report to Toronto and he was waived not long after the trade. He later signed with the Miami Heat for his second stint. By the time Carter arrived, Kidd returned from his knee surgery. Richard Jefferson spent most of the season on injured reserve due to a wrist injury. The Kidd and Carter duo-led Nets won 10 of their final 12 games to finished with a 42–40 record, winning a tie-breaker for the #8 seed in the Eastern Conference over the Cleveland Cavaliers. Carter was selected for the 2005 NBA All-Star Game.

In the first round of the playoffs, New Jersey faced the top-seeded Miami Heat, led by Shaquille O'Neal and a young Dwyane Wade. They were eliminated from the playoffs by the Heat in four straight games. It was the Nets' first round playoff exit since 1998. Following the season, Brian Scalabrine signed as the free agent with the Boston Celtics.

== Offseason ==
=== Draft picks ===
Round	Pick	Player	Position	Nationality	College
1	22	Viktor Khryapa	PF	Russia	
2	51	Christian Drejer	SF	Denmark	Florida

== Roster ==
2004–05 New Jersey Nets roster
Players

Pos.	No.	Player	Height	Weight	DOB	From
PG	6	Travis Best	5 ft 11 in (1.80 m)	182 lb (83 kg)	1972-07-12	Georgia Tech
G/F	2	Rodney Buford	6 ft 5 in (1.96 m)	189 lb (86 kg)	1977-11-02	Creighton
G/F	15	Vince Carter	6 ft 6 in (1.98 m)	215 lb (98 kg)	1977-01-26	North Carolina
C	35	Jason Collins	7 ft 0 in (2.13 m)	255 lb (116 kg)	1978-12-02	Stanford
SF	24	Richard Jefferson	6 ft 7 in (2.01 m)	230 lb (104 kg)	1980-06-21	Arizona
PG	5	Jason Kidd	6 ft 4 in (1.93 m)	210 lb (95 kg)	1973-03-23	California
F/C	12	Nenad Krstić	7 ft 0 in (2.13 m)	240 lb (109 kg)	1983-07-25	Serbia
G/F	1	Ron Mercer	6 ft 7 in (2.01 m)	210 lb (95 kg)	1976-05-18	Kentucky
G	10	Zoran Planinić	6 ft 7 in (2.01 m)	210 lb (95 kg)	1982-09-12	Croatia
F/C	30	Clifford Robinson	6 ft 10 in (2.08 m)	225 lb (102 kg)	1966-12-16	Connecticut
F/C	21	Brian Scalabrine	6 ft 9 in (2.06 m)	235 lb (107 kg)	1978-03-18	USC
F/C	55	Jabari Smith	6 ft 11 in (2.11 m)	250 lb (113 kg)	1977-02-12	LSU
G/F	20	Billy Thomas	6 ft 4 in (1.93 m)	208 lb (94 kg)	1975-12-23	Kansas
G	11	Jacque Vaughn	6 ft 1 in (1.85 m)	190 lb (86 kg)	1975-02-11	Kansas

Coaches
Head coach
- Lawrence Frank
Assistant(s)
- Tom Barrise
- Bill Cartwright
- Brian Hill
- John Kuester

Legend
- (DP) Unsigned draft pick
- (FA) Free agent
- (S) Suspended
- Injured

Roster
Updated: February 14, 2005

== Regular season ==
=== Season standings ===
Atlantic Division	W	L	PCT	GB	Home	Road	Div
y-Boston Celtics	45	37	.549	–	27–14	18–23	8–8
x-Philadelphia 76ers	43	39	.524	2	25–16	18–23	8–8
x-New Jersey Nets	42	40	.512	3	24–17	18–23	11–5
e-New York Knicks	33	49	.402	12	22–19	11–30	6–10
e-Toronto Raptors	33	49	.402	12	22–19	11–30	7–9

Eastern Conference
#	Team	W	L	PCT	GB
1	c-Miami Heat	59	23	.720	–
2	y-Detroit Pistons	54	28	.659	5
3	y-Boston Celtics	45	37	.549	14
4	x-Chicago Bulls	47	35	.573	12
5	x-Washington Wizards	45	37	.549	14
6	x-Indiana Pacers	44	38	.537	15
7	x-Philadelphia 76ers	43	39	.524	16
8	x-New Jersey Nets	42	40	.512	17
9	e-Cleveland Cavaliers	42	40	.512	17
10	e-Orlando Magic	36	46	.439	23
11	e-New York Knicks	33	49	.402	26
12	e-Toronto Raptors	33	49	.402	26
13	e-Milwaukee Bucks	30	52	.366	29
14	e-Charlotte Bobcats	18	64	.220	41
15	e-Atlanta Hawks	13	69	.159	46

z – clinched division title
y – clinched division title
x – clinched playoff spot

== Playoffs ==
2005 playoff game log
First round: 0–4 (home: 0–2; road: 0–2)

Game	Date	Team	Score	High points	High rebounds	High assists	Location Attendance	Series
1	April 24	@ Miami	L 98–116	Vince Carter (27)	Vince Carter (10)	Vince Carter (8)	American Airlines Arena; 20,212	0–1
2	April 26	@ Miami	L 87–104	Nenad Krstić (27)	Collins, Krstić (8)	Best, Kidd (5)	American Airlines Arena; 20,276	0–2
3	April 28	Miami	L 105–108 (2OT)	Vince Carter (36)	Jason Kidd (16)	Jason Kidd (13)	Continental Airlines Arena; 20,174	0–3
4	May 1	Miami	L 97–110	Jason Kidd (25)	Vince Carter (10)	Jason Kidd (7)	Continental Airlines Arena; 20,174	0–4

2005 schedule

== Player statistics ==
Legend
GP	Games played	GS	Games started	MPG	Minutes per game
FG%	Field-goal percentage	3P%	3-point field-goal percentage	FT%	Free-throw percentage
RPG	Rebounds per game	APG	Assists per game	SPG	Steals per game
BPG	Blocks per game	PPG	Points per game

=== Regular season ===
New Jersey Nets statistics
Player	GP	GS	MPG	FG%	3P%	FT%	RPG	APG	SPG	BPG	PPG
Travis Best	76	6	19.2	.420	.306	.885	1.4	1.9	0.9	0.1	6.8
Rodney Buford	64	17	20.5	.382	.315	.822	3.0	1.0	0.6	0.1	7.0
Elden Campbell	10	0	5.0	.000		0.500	1.1	0.3	0	0.1	0.2
Vince Carter	57	56	38.9	.462	.425	.817	5.9	4.7	1.5	0.6	27.5
Jason Collins	80	80	31.8	.412	.333	.656	6.1	1.3	0.9	0.9	6.4
Kaniel Dickens	11	0	5.5	.286	.333	1.00	0.8	0.1	0.2	0.1	1.2
Donnell Harvey	3	0	5.3	1.00		1.00	2.3	0.3	0.3	0.3	2.7
Richard Jefferson	33	33	41.1	.422	.337	.844	7.3	4	1	0.5	22.2
Jason Kidd	66	65	36.9	.398	.360	.740	7.4	8.3	1.9	0.1	14.4
Nenad Krstić	75	57	26.2	.493	.000	.725	5.3	1	0.4	0.8	10.0
Ron Mercer	18	3	21.7	.411	.000	.700	2.2	1.1	0.9	0.1	7.6
Jérôme Moïso	8	0	3	.750		.500	0.9	0	0	0.1	1.0
Alonzo Mourning	18	14	25.4	.453		.593	7.1	0.8	0.3	2.3	10.4
Zoran Planinić	43	8	12	.448	.375	.697	1.6	1	0.6	0	5.0
Clifford Robinson	29	0	20.7	.361	.379	.692	3.3	1	0.6	0.5	6.0
Brian Scalabrine	54	14	21.6	.398	.324	.768	4.5	1.6	0.6	0.3	6.3
Jabari Smith	45	2	14.4	.419	.500	.745	2.5	0.8	0.6	0.3	3.7
Awvee Storey	9	0	3.6	.300	.500	.500	0.6	0.1	0	0	0.9
Billy Thomas	25	0	14.2	.362	.304	.778	1.4	0.7	0.6	0	3.7
Eric Williams	21	21	35.2	.470	.425	.685	4.5	2.0	0.8	0.1	12.6
Aaron Williams	19	0	7.9	.519		.900	1.6	0.3	0.2	0.3	1.9

=== Playoffs ===
New Jersey Nets statistics
Player	GP	GS	MPG	FG%	3P%	FT%	RPG	APG	SPG	BPG	PPG
Jason Kidd	4	4	45.5	.388	.367	.545	9.0	7.3	2.5	0	17.3
Vince Carter	4	4	44.8	.365	.316	.861	8.5	5.8	2.3	0	26.8
Nenad Krstić	4	4	38.5	.563		.792	7.5	1.8	0.3	0.5	18.3
Richard Jefferson	4	1	35.0	.400	.200	.677	5.5	2.3	0.8	0	15.8
Jason Collins	4	4	32.0	.235		.375	6.5	0.3	0.5	0	2.8
Travis Best	4	0	20.5	.409	.111	.889	1.5	2.3	0.3	0	6.8
Clifford Robinson	4	0	17.8	.407	.286	1.0	2.5	1.3	0.8	0.3	7.0
Brian Scalabrine	4	3	15.3	.182	.250	1.0	1.8	0.5	0.3	0.5	2.3
Rodney Buford	3	0	1.3				0	0	0	0	0
Jabari Smith	3	0	1.3				0	0	0	0	0
Zoran Planinić	3	0	1.0				0	0	0	0	0
Billy Thomas	2	0	1.0	.000			0	0	0	0	0

== Awards and records ==
- Jason Kidd, NBA All-Defensive Second Team
- Nenad Krstić, NBA All-Rookie Second Team

== See also ==
- 2004–05 NBA season
