= 2004–05 Chicago Bulls season =

NBA professional basketball team season

- Head coach: Scott Skiles
- General manager: John Paxson
- Owners: Jerry Reinsdorf
- Arena: United Center

Results
- Record: 47–35 (.573)
- Place: Division: 2nd (Central); Conference: 4th (Eastern)
- Playoff finish: First Round (lost to Wizards 2–4)
- Stats at Basketball Reference

Local media
- Television: CSN Chicago, WGN, WCIU
- Radio: WMVP

The 2004–05 Chicago Bulls season was the Bulls' 39th season in the National Basketball Association. After the retirement of Scottie Pippen, the Bulls stumbled out of the gate as they lost their first nine games on their way to an awful 3–14 start. However, they would win 13 of their 16 games in January including a 7-game winning streak, then win nine straight games between March and April. The Bulls finished second in the Central Division with a record of 47–35, and qualified for the playoffs for the first time since 1998, when they last made the NBA Finals, as well as when they won their last NBA championship. Second-year star Kirk Hinrich averaged 15.7 points, 6.4 assists and 1.6 steals per game. Top draft pick Ben Gordon became the first rookie to win the Sixth Man of The Year Award, as he and Luol Deng were both selected to the All-Rookie First Team.

However, injuries were an issue as Deng was out for April and the postseason with a wrist injury, and Eddy Curry was sidelined due to a heart ailment. In the first round of the playoffs, the Bulls took a 2–0 lead over the Washington Wizards, but would lose the final four games of the series. Following the season, Curry and Antonio Davis were both traded to the New York Knicks.

This was the Bulls' first winning season and first playoff run since 1998, during the Michael Jordan era, when they won their sixth and most recent NBA championship.

For the season, they slightly changed their uniforms added the Bulls secondary logo on the back of the jersey. They remained in use until 2014.

== Offseason ==
The Bulls drafted Ben Gordon, Chris Duhon, and getting Luol Deng from a trade with the Phoenix Suns, with Gordon coming from Connecticut and Deng and Duhon coming from Duke. They also signed Argentinian forward Andrés Nocioni, who had played on several successful international teams. These acquisitions reflected John Paxson's strategy of building around players who had already been on successful teams, a departure from what Jerry Krause had done as General Manager, drafting Eddy Curry and Tyson Chandler in the same season, players who both showed tremendous potential, but were both coming to the NBA directly from high school.

Jamal Crawford and Jerome Williams were traded to the New York Knicks for Dikembe Mutombo and Cezary Trybanski. However, Mutombo was traded again to the Houston Rockets for Eric Piatkowski and Adrian Griffin without ever playing in a game for the Bulls and Trybanksi was waived by the team in October.

== NBA draft ==
Round	Pick	Player	Position	Nationality	College / Club Team
1	3	Ben Gordon	SG	United States; United Kingdom	Connecticut
2	32	Jackson Vroman	C	United States	Iowa State
2	38	Chris Duhon	PG	United States	Duke

== Roster ==
2004–05 Chicago Bulls roster
Players

Pos.	No.	Player	Height	Weight	DOB	From
C	3	Tyson Chandler	7 ft 1 in (2.16 m)	235 lb (107 kg)	1982-10-02	Dominguez HS (CA)
C	2	Eddy Curry	6 ft 11 in (2.11 m)	285 lb (129 kg)	1982-12-05	Thornwood HS (IL)
F/C	34	Antonio Davis	6 ft 9 in (2.06 m)	245 lb (111 kg)	1968-10-31	UTEP
F	9	Luol Deng	6 ft 8 in (2.03 m)	220 lb (100 kg)	1985-04-16	Duke
G	21	Chris Duhon	6 ft 1 in (1.85 m)	185 lb (84 kg)	1982-08-31	Duke
F	51	Lawrence Funderburke	6 ft 9 in (2.06 m)	230 lb (104 kg)	1970-12-15	Ohio State
G	7	Ben Gordon	6 ft 3 in (1.91 m)	200 lb (91 kg)	1983-04-04	Connecticut
G/F	44	Adrian Griffin	6 ft 5 in (1.96 m)	217 lb (98 kg)	1974-07-04	Seton Hall
F	24	Othella Harrington	6 ft 9 in (2.06 m)	235 lb (107 kg)	1974-01-31	Georgetown
G	12	Kirk Hinrich	6 ft 3 in (1.91 m)	190 lb (86 kg)	1981-01-02	Kansas
F	5	Andres Nocioni	6 ft 7 in (2.01 m)	225 lb (102 kg)	1979-11-30	Argentina
G	15	Jannero Pargo	6 ft 1 in (1.85 m)	175 lb (79 kg)	1979-10-22	Arkansas
G	52	Eric Piatkowski	6 ft 7 in (2.01 m)	215 lb (98 kg)	1970-09-30	Nebraska
C	35	Jared Reiner	6 ft 11 in (2.11 m)	255 lb (116 kg)	1982-04-08	Iowa
G	30	Frank Williams	6 ft 3 in (1.91 m)	212 lb (96 kg)	1980-02-25	Illinois

Coaches
Head coach
- Scott Skiles
Assistant(s)
- Ron Adams
- Jim Boylan
- Pete Myers
- Mike Wilhelm
- Fred Tedeschi (trainer)

Legend
- (DP) Unsigned draft pick
- (FA) Free agent
- (S) Suspended
- Injured

Roster
Updated: April 18, 2005

== Regular season ==
=== Season standings ===
Central Division	W	L	PCT	GB	Home	Road	Div
y-Detroit Pistons	54	28	.659	–	32–9	22–19	8–8
x-Chicago Bulls	47	35	.573	7	27–14	20–21	8–8
x-Indiana Pacers	44	38	.537	10	25–16	19–22	9–7
e-Cleveland Cavaliers	42	40	.512	12	29–12	13–28	7–9
e-Milwaukee Bucks	30	52	.366	24	23–18	7–34	8–8

Eastern Conference
#	Team	W	L	PCT	GB
1	c-Miami Heat	59	23	.720	–
2	y-Detroit Pistons	54	28	.659	5
3	y-Boston Celtics	45	37	.549	14
4	x-Chicago Bulls	47	35	.573	12
5	x-Washington Wizards	45	37	.549	14
6	x-Indiana Pacers	44	38	.537	15
7	x-Philadelphia 76ers	43	39	.524	16
8	x-New Jersey Nets	42	40	.512	17
9	e-Cleveland Cavaliers	42	40	.512	17
10	e-Orlando Magic	36	46	.439	23
11	e-New York Knicks	33	49	.402	26
12	e-Toronto Raptors	33	49	.402	26
13	e-Milwaukee Bucks	30	52	.366	29
14	e-Charlotte Bobcats	18	64	.220	41
15	e-Atlanta Hawks	13	69	.159	46

=== Schedule ===
Game	Date	Opponent	Result	Bulls score	Opponent score	Record	Streak	OT
1	November 5	New Jersey	Loss	106	111	0-1	Lost 1	2OT
2	November 6	@ Indiana	Loss	90	100	0-2	Lost 2	
3	November 9	Phoenix	Loss	74	94	0-3	Lost 3	
4	November 13	LA Clippers	Loss	96	97	0-4	Lost 4	
5	November 16	@ Sacramento	Loss	106	113	0-5	Lost 5	
6	November 17	@ Golden State	Loss	85	98	0-6	Lost 6	
7	November 19	@ Denver	Loss	81	99	0-7	Lost 7	
8	November 21	@ LA Lakers	Loss	93	102	0-8	Lost 8	
9	November 22	@ Phoenix	Loss	82	100	0-9	Lost 9	
10	November 24	@ Utah	Win	101	99	1-9	Won 1	
11	November 27	@ Cleveland	Loss	74	96	1-10	Lost 1	
12	December 1	LA Lakers	Win	92	84	2-10	Won 1	
13	December 3	Miami	Loss	81	105	2-11	Lost 1	
14	December 4	@ Washington	Loss	88	95	2-12	Lost 2	
15	December 6	San Antonio	Loss	75	91	2-13	Lost 3	
16	December 8	Cleveland	Win	113	85	3-13	Won 1	
17	December 10	Philadelphia	Loss	88	93	3-14	Lost 1	
18	December 11	Minnesota	Win	99	88	4-14	Won 1	
19	December 13	Dallas	Loss	93	94	4-15	Lost 1	
20	December 15	@ Memphis	Win	96	88	5-15	Won 1	
21	December 16	Milwaukee	Win	85	77	6-15	Won 2	
22	December 18	Indiana	Win	85	71	7-15	Won 3	
23	December 20	Portland	Win	92	87	8-15	Won 4	
24	December 22	@ Detroit	Win	89	82	9-15	Won 5	
25	December 26	@ Milwaukee	Loss	92	99	9-16	Lost 1	
26	December 28	New Jersey	Loss	80	84	9-17	Lost 2	
27	January 1	Orlando	Win	105	90	10-17	Won 1	
28	January 3	Detroit	Loss	80	87	10-18	Lost 1	
29	January 5	@ New Orleans	Win	95	89	11-18	Won 1	
30	January 7	Utah	Win	84	78	12-18	Won 2	
31	January 8	Boston	Win	102	91	13-18	Won 3	
32	January 10	Golden State	Win	94	85	14-18	Won 4	
33	January 12	Philadelphia	Win	110	87	15-18	Won 5	
34	January 15	New York	Win	86	84	16-18	Won 6	
35	January 17	@ New York	Win	88	86	17-18	Won 7	
36	January 19	@ Boston	Loss	83	92	17-19	Lost 1	
37	January 21	Atlanta	Win	95	85	18-19	Won 1	
38	January 22	@ Detroit	Win	100	89	19-19	Won 2	
39	January 24	@ Atlanta	Win	107	82	20-19	Won 3	
40	January 25	Denver	Win	111	107	21-19	Won 4	
41	January 27	Charlotte	Win	101	93	22-19	Won 5	
42	January 29	Boston	Loss	97	101	22-20	Lost 1	
43	February 1	@ New Jersey	Loss	97	107	22-21	Lost 2	
44	February 5	@ Miami	Loss	97	108	22-22	Lost 3	
45	February 8	@ Dallas	Win	107	100	23-22	Won 1	
46	February 9	@ Houston	Loss	92	105	23-23	Lost 1	
47	February 13	@ Minnesota	Win	87	83	24-23	Won 1	
48	February 15	Sacramento	Win	107	102	25-23	Won 2	
49	February 16	@ Toronto	Win	121	115	26-23	Won 3	
50	February 22	Miami	Win	105	101	27-23	Won 4	OT
51	February 23	@ Cleveland	Loss	91	100	27-24	Lost 1	
52	February 25	Washington	Win	97	90	28-24	Won 1	
53	February 26	@ Charlotte	Win	94	90	29-24	Won 2	
54	March 1	Houston	Loss	89	119	29-25	Lost 1	
55	March 4	@ San Antonio	Loss	99	102	29-26	Lost 2	
56	March 5	@ Milwaukee	Loss	87	95	29-27	Lost 3	
57	March 7	Milwaukee	Win	90	85	30-27	Won 1	
58	March 9	@ Portland	Win	97	84	31-27	Won 2	
59	March 11	@ Seattle	Win	100	97	32-27	Won 3	
60	March 13	@ LA Clippers	Loss	78	83	32-28	Lost 1	
61	March 15	Seattle	Loss	93	99	32-29	Lost 2	
62	March 16	@ New Jersey	Loss	84	100	32-30	Lost 3	
63	March 18	New Orleans	Loss	90	94	32-31	Lost 4	
64	March 19	@ Philadelphia	Win	94	88	33-31	Won 1	
65	March 21	Atlanta	Win	105	91	34-31	Won 2	
66	March 23	@ Toronto	Win	94	85	35-31	Won 3	
67	March 25	@ Boston	Win	94	86	36-31	Won 4	
68	March 26	Indiana	Win	100	96	37-31	Won 5	
69	March 28	Memphis	Win	94	86	38-31	Won 6	
70	March 30	@ Charlotte	Win	102	99	39-31	Won 7	
71	March 31	Cleveland	Win	102	90	40-31	Won 8	OT
72	April 2	Charlotte	Win	112	97	41-31	Won 9	
73	April 5	@ Miami	Loss	86	104	41-32	Lost 1	
74	April 6	@ Orlando	Win	102	101	42-32	Won 1	OT
75	April 8	@ New York	Win	102	94	43-32	Won 2	
76	April 9	Toronto	Win	110	97	44-32	Won 3	
77	April 11	Detroit	Loss	84	85	44-33	Lost 1	OT
78	April 13	@ Washington	Loss	82	93	44-34	Lost 2	
79	April 15	Orlando	Win	117	77	45-34	Won 1	
80	April 16	@ Atlanta	Win	114	105	46-34	Won 2	
81	April 19	New York	Win	92	91	47-34	Won 3	
82	April 20	@ Indiana	Loss	83	85	47-35	Lost 1	

== Playoffs ==
The Bulls' record of 47-35 was good enough for the #4 seed in the Eastern conference. In the first round of the playoffs the Bulls met another young team on the upswing, the Washington Wizards. The Bulls would lose the series 4–2, staying competitive throughout most of the series, but ultimately unable to find an answer for Wizards star Gilbert Arenas. The Bulls also entered the series nursing injuries. Most notably, Eddy Curry was injured in late March, and the Bulls signed veteran Lawrence Funderburke just days before the beginning of the postseason in an attempt to add more depth to their front-court.

2005 playoff game log
First Round: 2–4 (home: 2–1; road: 0–3)

Game	Date	Team	Score	High points	High rebounds	High assists	Location Attendance	Series
1	April 24	Washington	W 103–94	Ben Gordon (30)	Andrés Nocioni (18)	Kirk Hinrich (7)	United Center; 22,655	1–0
2	April 27	Washington	W 113–103	Kirk Hinrich (34)	Chris Duhon (8)	Chris Duhon (7)	United Center; 22,605	2–0
3	April 30	@ Washington	L 99–117	Tyson Chandler (15)	Antonio Davis (11)	three players tied (4)	MCI Center; 20,173	2–1
4	May 2	@ Washington	L 99–106	Hinrich, Pargo (18)	Tyson Chandler (13)	Gordon, Hinrich (5)	MCI Center; 20,173	2–2
5	May 4	Washington	L 110–112	Ben Gordon (27)	Tyson Chandler (10)	Kirk Hinrich (7)	United Center; 22,250	2–3
6	May 6	@ Washington	L 91–94	Hinrich, Nocioni (22)	Tyson Chandler (11)	Kirk Hinrich (9)	MCI Center; 20,173	2–4

2005 schedule

== Player statistics ==
Legend
GP	Games played	GS	Games started	MPG	Minutes per game
FG%	Field-goal percentage	3P%	3-point field-goal percentage	FT%	Free-throw percentage
RPG	Rebounds per game	APG	Assists per game	SPG	Steals per game
BPG	Blocks per game	PPG	Points per game

=== Regular season ===
Player	GP	GS	MPG	FG%	3P%	FT%	RPG	APG	SPG	BPG	PPG
Tyson Chandler	80	10	27.4	.494	.000	.673	9.7	.8	.9	1.8	8.0
Eddy Curry	63	60	28.7	.538		.720	5.4	.6	.3	.9	16.1
Antonio Davis	72	62	25.6	.461		.757	5.9	1.1	.4	.6	7.0
Luol Deng	61	45	27.3	.434	.265	.741	5.3	2.2	.8	.4	11.7
Chris Duhon	82	73	26.5	.352	.355	.731	2.6	4.9	1.0	.0	5.9
Lawrence Funderburke	2	0	10.5	.500		.600	1.5	.0	.0	.0	4.5
Ben Gordon	82	3	24.4	.411	.405	.863	2.6	2.0	.6	.1	15.1
Adrian Griffin	69	1	9.7	.360	.222	.750	2.1	.8	.6	.1	2.2
Othella Harrington	70	28	18.2	.512		.718	4.2	.8	.3	.3	8.0
Kirk Hinrich	77	77	36.4	.397	.355	.792	3.9	6.4	1.6	.3	15.7
Andrés Nocioni	81	38	23.4	.401	.258	.766	4.8	1.5	.5	.4	8.4
Jannero Pargo	32	0	14.2	.385	.348	.739	1.5	2.4	.5	.0	6.4
Eric Piatkowski	68	11	12.4	.430	.425	.804	1.2	.8	.4	.0	4.8
Jared Reiner	19	2	6.9	.333		.250	2.0	.1	.2	.4	1.1
Frank Williams	9	0	7.9	.150	.000		.7	1.2	.2	.3	.7

=== Playoffs ===
Player	GP	GS	MPG	FG%	3P%	FT%	RPG	APG	SPG	BPG	PPG
Tyson Chandler	6	0	28.7	.475		.696	9.7	1.3	.2	2.2	11.7
Antonio Davis	6	6	29.2	.435		.739	6.8	1.8	.7	.7	9.5
Chris Duhon	6	5	26.5	.297	.273	.818	4.3	3.5	.3	.0	6.2
Lawrence Funderburke	5	0	5.6	.500		.500	.6	.2	.0	.0	.6
Ben Gordon	6	1	25.5	.405	.318	.800	2.7	2.5	.8	.3	14.5
Adrian Griffin	5	0	17.2	.517		.800	4.0	1.8	1.0	.0	6.8
Othella Harrington	6	6	17.2	.500		.545	2.5	.5	.2	.0	8.0
Kirk Hinrich	6	6	35.5	.450	.515	.690	3.7	5.8	2.0	.7	21.2
Andrés Nocioni	6	6	33.7	.403	.353	.739	8.2	2.3	.2	1.0	12.8
Jannero Pargo	5	0	15.2	.353	.406	.600	1.0	2.0	.6	.0	10.4
Eric Piatkowski	5	0	13.2	.316	.385	.857	1.8	.6	.8	.2	4.6
Jared Reiner	3	0	2.3	.000			1.0	.0	.0	.0	.0

- ^{†} Denotes player spent time with another team in the season. Stats reflect time with the Bulls only.

== Awards and records ==
- Ben Gordon, NBA Sixth Man of the Year Award
- Ben Gordon, NBA All-Rookie Team 1st Team
- Luol Deng, NBA All-Rookie Team 1st Team

Ben Gordon lost out to Emeka Okafor for Rookie of the Year honors, but did win Sixth Man of the Year honors, averaging 15.1 points per game despite making only three starts.

== Transactions ==
- June 24, 2004: Drafted G Ben Gordon in the 1st round (3rd overall) of the 2004 NBA Draft
- June 24, 2004: Drafted C Jackson Vroman in the 2nd round (31st overall) of the 2004 NBA Draft
- June 24, 2004: Drafted G Chris Duhon in the 2nd round (38th overall) of the 2004 NBA Draft
- June 24, 2004: Traded C Jackson Vroman, a future first-round pick and cash to the Phoenix Suns for F Luol Deng
- August 5, 2004: Traded G Jamal Crawford and F Jerome Williams to the New York Knicks for C Dikembe Mutombo, F Othella Harrington, G Frank Williams and C Cezary Trybański
- August 11, 2004: Signed free agent F Andrés Nocioni
- August 20, 2004: Waived F Paul Shirley
- September 8, 2004: Traded C Dikembe Mutombo to the Houston Rockets for G Adrian Griffin, F Eric Piatkowski and G Mike Wilks
- September 30, 2004: Signed free agent C Jared Reiner
- October 4, 2004: Waived F Chris Jefferies
- October 5, 2004: Announced the retirement of F Scottie Pippen
- October 20, 2004: Waived G Mike Wilks
- October 28, 2004: Waived C Cezary Trybański
- November 1, 2004: Waived F Eddie Robinson
- January 5, 2005: Waived F Tommy Smith
- April 18, 2005: Signed F Lawrence Funderburke
