= 2004–05 Orlando Magic season =

NBA professional basketball team season

- Head coach: Johnny Davis; Chris Jent (interim)
- President: Bob Vander Weide
- General manager: John Weisbrod
- Owner: Richard DeVos
- Arena: TD Waterhouse Centre

Results
- Record: 36–46 (.439)
- Place: Division: 3rd (Southeast); Conference: 10th (Eastern)
- Playoff finish: Did not qualify
- Stats at Basketball Reference

Local media
- Television: FSN Florida, WBRW

The 2004–05 season was the 16th season of the Orlando Magic in the National Basketball Association (NBA). After finishing the previous year with a league-worst 21–61 record, the Magic won the NBA Draft Lottery for the third time in franchise history, and selected high school star Dwight Howard with the first overall pick in the 2004 NBA draft. During the offseason, the Magic acquired All-Star guard Steve Francis and Cuttino Mobley from the Houston Rockets, and signed free agent Hedo Turkoglu. The team looked to be a playoff contender playing above .500 for the first half of the season. In January, Mobley was traded to the Sacramento Kings for Doug Christie. However, head coach Johnny Davis was fired after a 31–33 start, and was replaced with Chris Jent. The Magic finished third in the Southeast Division with a 36–46 record, a 15-game improvement from the previous season.

Grant Hill finally played a full season with the Magic averaging 19.7 points per game, while being selected to play in the 2005 NBA All-Star Game, his first All-Star selection since 2000. Howard was selected to the All-Rookie First Team, while Jameer Nelson made the All-Rookie Second Team.

== Draft picks ==
Round	Pick	Player	Position	Nationality	College / Club
1	1	Dwight Howard	C	United States	
2	31	Anderson Varejão	F/C	Brazil	FC Barcelona (Spain)
2	37	Antonio Burks	G	United States	Memphis

== Roster ==
2004–05 Orlando Magic roster
Players

Pos.	No.	Player	Height	Weight	DOB	From
F	2	Stacey Augmon	6 ft 8 in (2.03 m)	205 lb (93 kg)	1968-08-01	UNLV
G	11	Andre Barrett	5 ft 10 in (1.78 m)	172 lb (78 kg)	1982-01-17	Seton Hall
F/C	4	Tony Battie	6 ft 11 in (2.11 m)	230 lb (104 kg)	1976-02-11	Texas Tech
C	13	Kelvin Cato	6 ft 11 in (2.11 m)	255 lb (116 kg)	1974-08-26	Iowa State
G/F	1	Doug Christie	6 ft 6 in (1.98 m)	200 lb (91 kg)	1970-05-09	Pepperdine
F/C	55	Andrew DeClercq	6 ft 10 in (2.08 m)	230 lb (104 kg)	1973-02-01	Florida
G	3	Steve Francis	6 ft 3 in (1.91 m)	195 lb (88 kg)	1977-02-21	Maryland
F	8	Pat Garrity	6 ft 9 in (2.06 m)	238 lb (108 kg)	1976-08-03	Notre Dame
F	33	Grant Hill	6 ft 8 in (2.03 m)	225 lb (102 kg)	1972-10-05	Duke
C	12	Dwight Howard	6 ft 11 in (2.11 m)	240 lb (109 kg)	1985-12-08	SW Atlanta Christian Academy HS (GA)
F	34	Brandon Hunter	6 ft 7 in (2.01 m)	260 lb (118 kg)	1980-11-24	Ohio
C	41	Mario Kasun	7 ft 1 in (2.16 m)	260 lb (118 kg)	1980-04-05	Croatia
G	5	Cuttino Mobley	6 ft 4 in (1.93 m)	190 lb (86 kg)	1975-09-01	Rhode Island
G	14	Jameer Nelson	6 ft 0 in (1.83 m)	190 lb (86 kg)	1982-02-09	Saint Joseph's
G	9	DeShawn Stevenson	6 ft 5 in (1.96 m)	210 lb (95 kg)	1981-04-03	Washington Union HS (CA)
F	15	Hedo Türkoğlu	6 ft 10 in (2.08 m)	220 lb (100 kg)	1979-03-19	Turkey

Coaches
Head coach
- Johnny Davis (fired)
- Chris Jent
Assistant(s)
- Clifford Ray
- Paul Westhead
- Morlon Wiley

Legend
- (DP) Unsigned draft pick
- (FA) Free agent
- (S) Suspended
- Injured

Roster
Updated: March 31, 2005

== Regular season ==
=== Season standings ===
Southeast Division	W	L	PCT	GB	Home	Road	Div
y-Miami Heat	59	23	.720	–	35–6	24–17	15–1
x-Washington Wizards	45	37	.549	14	29–12	16–25	10–6
e-Orlando Magic	36	46	.439	23	24–17	12–29	6–10
e-Charlotte Bobcats	18	64	.220	41	14–27	4–37	7–9
e-Atlanta Hawks	13	69	.159	46	9–32	4–37	2–14

Eastern Conference
#	Team	W	L	PCT	GB
1	c-Miami Heat	59	23	.720	–
2	y-Detroit Pistons	54	28	.659	5
3	y-Boston Celtics	45	37	.549	14
4	x-Chicago Bulls	47	35	.573	12
5	x-Washington Wizards	45	37	.549	14
6	x-Indiana Pacers	44	38	.537	15
7	x-Philadelphia 76ers	43	39	.524	16
8	x-New Jersey Nets	42	40	.512	17
9	e-Cleveland Cavaliers	42	40	.512	17
10	e-Orlando Magic	36	46	.439	23
11	e-New York Knicks	33	49	.402	26
12	e-Toronto Raptors	33	49	.402	26
13	e-Milwaukee Bucks	30	52	.366	29
14	e-Charlotte Bobcats	18	64	.220	41
15	e-Atlanta Hawks	13	69	.159	46

z – clinched division title
y – clinched division title
x – clinched playoff spot

== Player statistics ==
=== Regular season ===
Player	POS	GP	GS	MP	REB	AST	STL	BLK	PTS	MPG	RPG	APG	SPG	BPG	PPG
Dwight Howard	PF	82	82	2,670	823	75	77	136	981	32.6	10.0	.9	.9	1.7	12.0
Tony Battie	C	81	32	1,894	452	42	30	81	394	23.4	5.6	.5	.4	1.0	4.9
Jameer Nelson	PG	79	21	1,612	193	237	78	3	689	20.4	2.4	3.0	1.0	.0	8.7
Steve Francis	PG	78	78	2,978	450	547	112	28	1,663	38.2	5.8	7.0	1.4	.4	21.3
Pat Garrity	PF	71	0	955	124	30	19	9	324	13.5	1.7	.4	.3	.1	4.6
Grant Hill	SF	67	67	2,338	318	220	97	28	1,317	34.9	4.7	3.3	1.4	.4	19.7
Hedo Türkoğlu	SF	67	11	1,757	233	153	41	18	937	26.2	3.5	2.3	.6	.3	14.0
Kelvin Cato	C	62	50	1,525	416	40	55	82	432	24.6	6.7	.6	.9	1.3	7.0
DeShawn Stevenson	SG	55	27	1,089	102	69	16	9	429	19.8	1.9	1.3	.3	.2	7.8
Stacey Augmon	SF	55	7	663	99	36	23	8	193	12.1	1.8	.7	.4	.1	3.5
Mario Kasun	C	45	0	356	128	8	8	13	118	7.9	2.8	.2	.2	.3	2.6
Brandon Hunter	PF	31	0	224	69	3	4	7	95	7.2	2.2	.1	.1	.2	3.1
Cuttino Mobley^{†}	SG	23	21	726	63	42	23	9	369	31.6	2.7	1.8	1.0	.4	16.0
Doug Christie^{†}	SG	21	13	529	54	46	37	5	119	25.2	2.6	2.2	1.8	.2	5.7
Andre Barrett^{†}	PG	11	1	169	21	27	5	1	62	15.4	1.9	2.5	.5	.1	5.6
Mark Jones	SF	10	0	116	13	6	5	2	23	11.6	1.3	.6	.5	.2	2.3
Michael Bradley^{†}	PF	8	0	55	14	2	1	2	6	6.9	1.8	.3	.1	.3	.8
Andrew DeClercq	C	8	0	49	10	0	2	0	9	6.1	1.3	.0	.3	.0	1.1

- ^{†} Denotes player spent time with another team in the season. Stats reflect time with the Magic only.

== Awards and honors ==
- Grant Hill – NBA Sportsmanship Award, All-Star
- Dwight Howard – All-Rookie 1st Team
- Jameer Nelson – All-Rookie 2nd Team
