= 2004–05 Charlotte Bobcats season =

NBA professional basketball team season

- Head coach: Bernie Bickerstaff
- General manager: Bernie Bickerstaff
- Owner: Robert L. Johnson
- Arena: Charlotte Coliseum

Results
- Record: 18–64 (.220)
- Place: Division: 4th (Southeast); Conference: 14th (Eastern)
- Playoff finish: Did not qualify
- Stats at Basketball Reference

Local media
- Television: C-SET, WJZY
- Radio: WOLS

The 2004–05 Charlotte Bobcats season was the first season for the Charlotte Bobcats in the National Basketball Association. This season marked the return of NBA basketball to Charlotte after a two-year hiatus. The original Hornets had moved to New Orleans after the 2001–02 season to become the New Orleans Hornets, now the New Orleans Pelicans. The Bobcats had the second overall pick in the 2004 NBA draft, which they used to select Emeka Okafor out of the University of Connecticut. The team hired Bernie Bickerstaff as head coach during the offseason, and added veteran players like Gerald Wallace, Primož Brezec, Brevin Knight, Jason Hart, Jason Kapono, Melvin Ely and Steve Smith to their roster. The Bobcats played their first game at the Charlotte Coliseum on November 4, which was a 103–96 loss to the Washington Wizards. They would win their first game defeating the Orlando Magic 111–100 at home on November 6. However, the expansion team struggled, losing ten straight games in January and March, finishing fourth in the Southeast Division with an 18–64 record. Okafor averaged 15.1 points, 10.9 rebounds, 1.7 blocks per game and was named Rookie of The Year, and selected to the NBA All-Rookie First Team. Unable to improve on their 44–38 record from 2002, the Bobcats failed to qualify for the playoffs for the first time since 1999 when they were the Charlotte Hornets, and instead went 18–64, which was at the time, the worst record posted by a Hornet/Bobcat team.

At the time, this was reckoned as the inaugural season of the Bobcats. However, after the 2013–14 season, the Bobcats reclaimed the Hornets name and pre-2002 history after the original Hornets team changed its name to the Pelicans. As a result, this is now considered the 15th season of the Hornets/Bobcats franchise, the team having returned after suspending operations from 2002 to 2004. Thus, it was also their final season in which the franchise played their home games at the Charlotte Coliseum, as they would move to the newly built Charlotte Bobcats Arena for the following season.

As an expansion franchise, the team unveiled their new logo and uniforms, which added dark navy blue, grey, and orange to their color scheme and added side panels to their jerseys and shorts, which remained in use until 2008.

== Draft picks ==
Round	Pick	Player	Position	Nationality	College
1	2	Emeka Okafor	United States	PF/C	Connecticut
2	45	Bernard Robinson	United States	SF	Michigan

The team debuted in the draft as the Bobcats with one first-round pick and one second-round pick, both of which were acquired via trades in the preceding days. They had also traded their two original selections to the Los Angeles Clippers in exchange for that first-round pick.

== Roster ==
2004–05 Charlotte Bobcats roster
Players

Pos.	No.	Player	Height	Weight	DOB	From
SG	12	Cory Alexander	6 ft 1 in (1.85 m)	185 lb (84 kg)	1973-06-22	Virginia
PF	35	Malik Allen	6 ft 10 in (2.08 m)	255 lb (116 kg)	1978-06-27	Villanova
SG	10	Keith Bogans	6 ft 5 in (1.96 m)	215 lb (98 kg)	1980-05-12	Kentucky
C	7	Primož Brezec	7 ft 2 in (2.18 m)	252 lb (114 kg)	1979-10-02	Slovenia
SG	13	Matt Carroll	6 ft 6 in (1.98 m)	212 lb (96 kg)	1980-08-28	Notre Dame
PF	2	Melvin Ely	6 ft 10 in (2.08 m)	260 lb (118 kg)	1978-05-02	Fresno State
PG	1	Jason Hart	6 ft 3 in (1.91 m)	180 lb (82 kg)	1978-04-29	Syracuse
SF	24	Jason Kapono	6 ft 8 in (2.03 m)	215 lb (98 kg)	1981-02-04	UCLA
PG	22	Brevin Knight	5 ft 10 in (1.78 m)	173 lb (78 kg)	1975-11-08	Stanford
F/C	50	Emeka Okafor	6 ft 10 in (2.08 m)	252 lb (114 kg)	1982-09-28	Connecticut
SG	4	Kareem Rush	6 ft 5 in (1.96 m)	200 lb (91 kg)	1980-10-30	Missouri
SG	32	Tamar Slay	6 ft 8 in (2.03 m)	215 lb (98 kg)	1980-04-02	Marshall
SF	3	Gerald Wallace	6 ft 7 in (2.01 m)	215 lb (98 kg)	1982-07-23	Alabama
F/C	55	Jahidi White	6 ft 9 in (2.06 m)	290 lb (132 kg)	1976-02-19	Georgetown

Coaches
Head coach
- Bernie Bickerstaff
Assistant(s)
- J. B. Bickerstaff
- Gary Brokaw
- Jeff Capel II
- Gary Kloppenburg
- John Outlaw

Legend
- (DP) Unsigned draft pick
- (FA) Free agent
- (S) Suspended
- Injured

Roster
Updated: March 2, 2005

== Standings ==
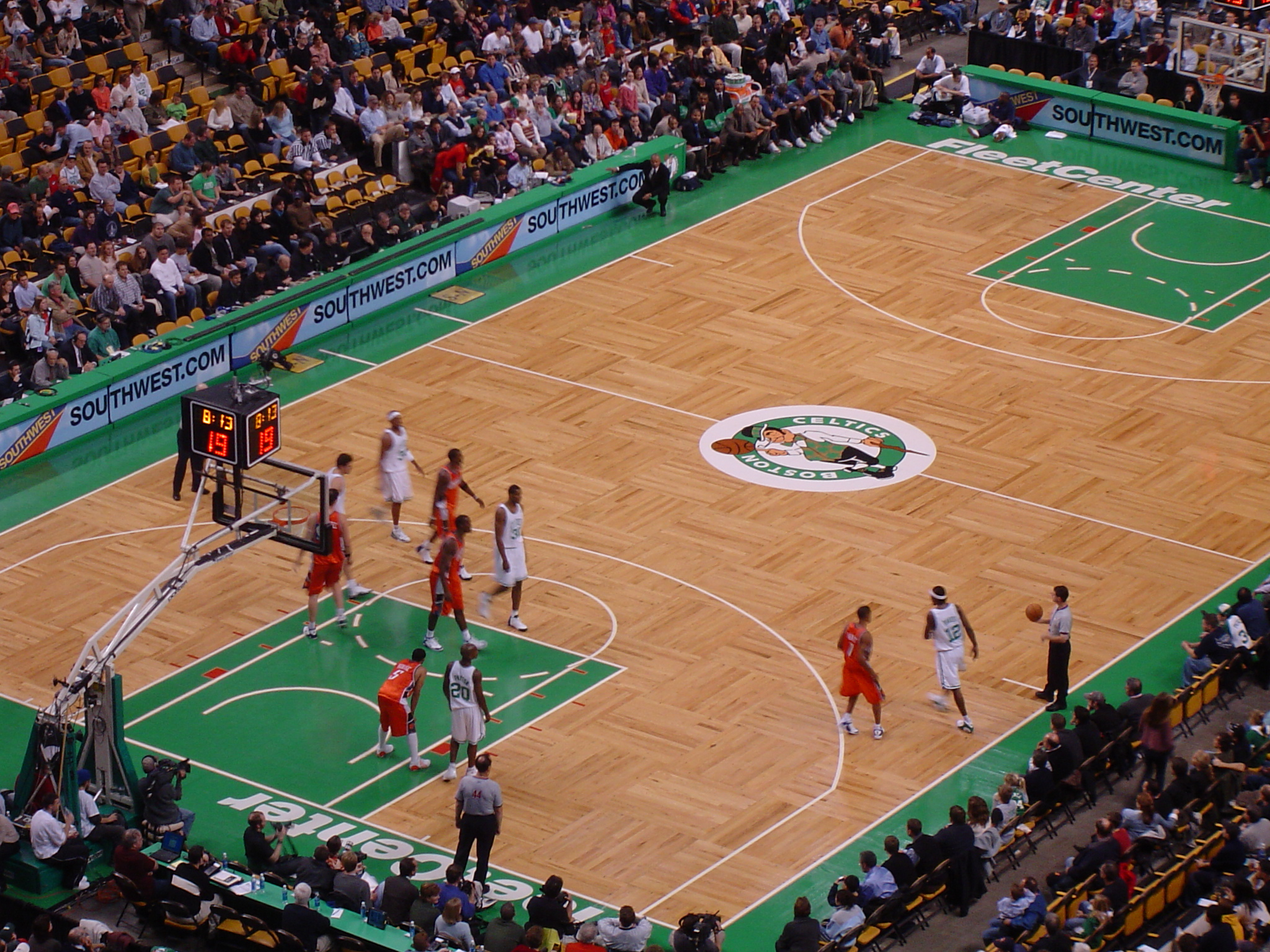
A regular-season game between the Charlotte Bobcats and the Boston Celtics at Fleet Center on November 12, 2004.

Southeast Division	W	L	PCT	GB	Home	Road	Div
y-Miami Heat	59	23	.720	–	35–6	24–17	15–1
x-Washington Wizards	45	37	.549	14	29–12	16–25	10–6
e-Orlando Magic	36	46	.439	23	24–17	12–29	6–10
e-Charlotte Bobcats	18	64	.220	41	14–27	4–37	7–9
e-Atlanta Hawks	13	69	.159	46	9–32	4–37	2–14

Eastern Conference
#	Team	W	L	PCT	GB
1	c-Miami Heat	59	23	.720	–
2	y-Detroit Pistons	54	28	.659	5
3	y-Boston Celtics	45	37	.549	14
4	x-Chicago Bulls	47	35	.573	12
5	x-Washington Wizards	45	37	.549	14
6	x-Indiana Pacers	44	38	.537	15
7	x-Philadelphia 76ers	43	39	.524	16
8	x-New Jersey Nets	42	40	.512	17
9	e-Cleveland Cavaliers	42	40	.512	17
10	e-Orlando Magic	36	46	.439	23
11	e-New York Knicks	33	49	.402	26
12	e-Toronto Raptors	33	49	.402	26
13	e-Milwaukee Bucks	30	52	.366	29
14	e-Charlotte Bobcats	18	64	.220	41
15	e-Atlanta Hawks	13	69	.159	46

=== Record vs. opponents ===
2004-05 NBA Records
Team	ATL	BOS	CHA	CHI	CLE	DAL	DEN	DET	GSW	HOU	IND	LAC	LAL	MEM	MIA	MIL	MIN	NJN	NOH	NYK	ORL	PHI	PHO	POR	SAC	SAS	SEA	TOR	UTA	WAS
Atlanta	—	1–3	1–3	0–4	0–4	1–1	0–2	1–3	0–2	1–1	0–3	0–2	1–1	0–2	0–4	1–2	1–1	0–3	1–1	1–3	1–3	1–3	0–2	0–2	0–2	0–2	0–2	1–2	0–2	0–4
Boston	3–1	—	4–0	2–2	1–2	0–2	0–2	1–3	1–1	1–1	1–2	2–0	1–1	1–1	1–2	3–1	1–1	1–3	2–0	3–1	3–0	1–3	1–1	1–1	0–2	0–2	2–0	3–1	2–0	3–1
Charlotte	3–1	0–4	—	0–4	0–4	0–2	1–1	2–1	0–2	2–0	0–3	0–2	0–2	0–2	1–3	0–4	1–1	0–4	1–1	1–3	3–1	0–3	0–2	0–2	1–1	0–2	0–2	1–2	1–1	0–4
Chicago	4–0	2–2	4–0	—	2–2	1–1	1–1	2–2	1–1	0–2	2–2	0–2	1–1	2–0	1–3	2–2	2–0	0–4	1–1	4–0	3–0	2–1	0–2	2–0	1–1	0–2	1–1	3–0	2–0	1–2
Cleveland	4–0	2–1	4–0	2–2	—	1–1	1–1	2–2	2–0	0–2	1–3	1–1	1–1	2–0	0–3	2–2	1–1	1–3	2–0	1–3	3–1	0–3	1–1	2–0	0–2	0–2	0–2	3–1	2–0	1–2
Dallas	1–1	2–0	2–0	1–1	1–1	—	2–1	1–1	3–1	2–2	1–1	1–2	2–2	4–0	2–0	2–0	2–2	2–0	4–0	2–0	1–1	1–1	1–2	4–0	3–1	1–3	3–1	2–0	3–0	2–0
Denver	2–0	2–0	1–1	1–1	1–1	1–2	—	1–1	2–2	1–2	2–0	2–1	2–2	4–0	1–1	2–0	2–2	1–1	4–0	1–1	1–1	1–1	0–4	3–1	1–2	2–2	2–2	2–0	2–2	2–0
Detroit	3–1	3–1	1–2	2–2	2–2	1–1	1–1	—	2–0	2–0	2–2	2–0	2–0	0–2	2–1	2–2	1–1	2–1	2–0	3–0	3–1	3–1	1–1	1–1	1–1	1–1	1–1	3–1	1–1	4–0
Golden State	2–0	1–1	2–0	1–1	0–2	1–3	2–2	0–2	—	1–2	1–1	0–4	1–3	1–3	0–2	2–0	1–2	0–2	2–2	1–1	1–1	1–1	2–2	2–2	3–1	0–3	2–2	1–1	2–1	1–1
Houston	1–1	1–1	0–2	2–0	2–0	2–2	2–1	0–2	2–1	—	1–1	3–0	2–2	3–1	1–1	1–1	1–2	2–0	3–1	1–1	2–0	2–0	2–2	4–0	2–2	2–2	3–1	1–1	2–2	1–1
Indiana	3–0	2–1	3–0	2–2	3–1	1–1	0–2	2–2	1–1	1–1	—	0–2	1–1	2–0	3–1	2–2	2–0	2–2	1–1	2–2	1–3	0–4	1–1	2–0	0–2	1–1	0–2	2–1	2–0	2–2
L.A. Clippers	2–0	0–2	2–0	2–0	1–1	2–1	1–2	0–2	4–0	0–3	2–0	—	2–2	1–3	1–1	1–1	1–3	1–1	3–1	1–1	1–1	1–1	0–4	2–2	0–4	0–4	2–1	1–1	2–2	1–1
L.A. Lakers	1–1	1–1	2–0	1–1	1–1	2–2	2–2	0–2	3–1	2–2	1–1	2–2	—	0–3	0–2	2–0	2–1	1–1	3–0	1–1	1–1	0–2	0–4	2–1	1–3	0–4	1–3	1–1	1–3	0–2
Memphis	2–0	1–1	2–0	0–2	0–2	0–4	0–4	2–0	3–1	1–3	0–2	3–1	3–0	—	1–1	2–0	3–1	2–0	3–1	1–1	1–1	2–0	2–2	3–1	0–3	3–1	0–3	2–0	3–0	0–2
Miami	4–0	2–1	3–1	3–1	3–0	0–2	1–1	1–2	2–0	1–1	1–3	1–1	2–0	1–1	—	4–0	1–1	3–0	2–0	4–0	4–0	2–2	1–1	1–1	2–0	1–1	0–2	3–1	2–0	4–0
Milwaukee	2–1	1–3	4–0	2–2	2–2	0–2	0–2	2–2	0–2	1–1	2–2	1–1	0–2	0–2	0–4	—	1–1	2–1	1–1	2–1	2–1	0–4	0–2	0–2	0–2	0–2	1–1	2–2	1–1	1–3
Minnesota	1–1	1–1	1–1	0–2	1–1	2–2	2–2	1–1	2–1	2–1	0–2	3–1	1–2	1–3	1–1	1–1	—	2–0	4–0	1–1	1–1	2–0	1–3	4–0	3–1	1–2	1–3	0–2	3–1	1–1
New Jersey	3–0	3–1	4–0	4–0	3–1	0–2	1–1	1–2	2–0	0–2	2–2	1–1	1–1	0–2	0–3	1–2	0–2	—	2–0	3–1	1–3	3–1	0–2	1–1	1–1	0–2	0–2	2–2	2–0	1–3
New Orleans	1–1	0–2	1–1	1–1	0–2	0–4	0–4	0–2	2–2	1–3	1–1	1–3	0–3	1–3	0–2	1–1	0–4	0–2	—	1–1	0–2	1–1	0–4	2–1	1–2	0–4	0–3	0–2	2–2	1–1
New York	3–1	1–3	3–1	0–4	3–1	0–2	1–1	0–3	1–1	1–1	2–2	1–1	1–1	1–1	0–4	1–2	1–1	1–3	1–1	—	1–2	3–1	0–2	1–1	0–2	1–1	0–2	1–3	2–0	2–1
Orlando	3–1	0–3	1–3	0–3	1–3	1–1	1–1	1–3	1–1	0–2	3–1	1–1	1–1	1–1	0–4	1–2	1–1	3–1	2–0	2–1	—	2–2	0–2	1–1	1–1	1–1	1–1	2–2	2–0	2–2
Philadelphia	3–1	3–1	3–0	1–2	3–0	1–1	1–1	1–3	1–1	0–2	4–0	1–1	2–0	0–2	2–2	4–0	0–2	1–3	1–1	1–3	2–2	—	0–2	1–1	0–2	0–2	1–1	3–1	1–1	2–1
Phoenix	2–0	1–1	2–0	2–0	1–1	2–1	4–0	1–1	2–2	2–2	1–1	4–0	4–0	2–2	1–1	2–0	3–1	2–0	4–0	2–0	2–0	2–0	—	3–0	2–2	1–2	2–1	2–0	3–1	1–1
Portland	2–0	1–1	2–0	0–2	0–2	0–4	1–3	1–1	2–2	0–4	0–2	2–2	1–2	1–3	1–1	2–0	0–4	1–1	1–2	1–1	1–1	1–1	0–3	—	1–3	1–2	1–3	1–1	2–2	0–2
Sacramento	2–0	2–0	1–1	1–1	2–0	1–3	2–1	1–1	1–3	2–2	2–0	4–0	3–1	3–0	0–2	2–0	1–3	1–1	2–1	2–0	1–1	2–0	2–2	3–1	—	1–3	1–3	1–1	2–1	2–0
San Antonio	2–0	2–0	2–0	2–0	2–0	3–1	2–2	1–1	3–0	2–2	1–1	4–0	4–0	1–3	1–1	2–0	2–1	2–0	4–0	1–1	1–1	2–0	2–1	2–1	3–1	—	2–2	1–1	2–2	1–1
Seattle	2–0	0–2	2–0	1–1	2–0	1–3	2–2	1–1	2–2	1–3	2–0	1–2	3–1	3–0	2–0	1–1	3–1	2–0	3–0	2–0	1–1	1–1	1–2	3–1	3–1	2–2	—	2–0	3–1	0–2
Toronto	2–1	1–3	2–1	0–3	1–3	0–2	0–2	1–3	1–1	1–1	1–2	1–1	1–1	0–2	1–3	2–2	2–0	2–2	2–0	3–1	2–2	1–3	0–2	1–1	1–1	1–1	0–2	—	2–0	1–3
Utah	2–0	0–2	1–1	0–2	0–2	0–3	2–2	1–1	1–2	2–2	0–2	2–2	3–1	0–3	0–2	1–1	1–3	0–2	2–2	0–2	0–2	1–1	1–3	2–2	1–2	2–2	1–3	0–2	—	0–2
Washington	4–0	1–3	4–0	2–1	2–1	0–2	0–2	0–4	1–1	1–1	2–2	1–1	2–0	2–0	0–4	3–1	1–1	3–1	1–1	1–2	2–2	1–2	1–1	2–0	0–2	1–1	2–0	3–1	2–0	—

== Player statistics ==
=== Regular season ===
Player	POS	GP	GS	MP	REB	AST	STL	BLK	PTS	MPG	RPG	APG	SPG	BPG	PPG
Jason Kapono	SF	81	14	1,491	164	61	40	6	688	18.4	2.0	.8	.5	.1	8.5
Melvin Ely	PF	79	17	1,649	326	76	32	69	576	20.9	4.1	1.0	.4	.9	7.3
Keith Bogans	SG	74	42	1,791	226	135	68	8	714	24.2	3.1	1.8	.9	.1	9.6
Jason Hart	PG	74	27	1,887	203	367	99	14	706	25.5	2.7	5.0	1.3	.2	9.5
Emeka Okafor	PF	73	73	2,600	795	64	62	125	1,105	35.6	10.9	.9	.8	1.7	15.1
Primož Brezec	C	72	72	2,276	531	86	33	55	938	31.6	7.4	1.2	.5	.8	13.0
Gerald Wallace	SF	70	68	2,147	386	137	117	91	780	30.7	5.5	2.0	1.7	1.3	11.1
Brevin Knight	PG	66	61	1,944	170	591	131	5	666	29.5	2.6	9.0	2.0	.1	10.1
Steve Smith^{†}	SG	37	1	636	49	57	12	7	291	17.2	1.3	1.5	.3	.2	7.9
Kareem Rush^{†}	SG	34	22	877	79	65	18	6	390	25.8	2.3	1.9	.5	.2	11.5
Theron Smith	SF	33	5	510	116	28	6	4	105	15.5	3.5	.8	.2	.1	3.2
Bernard Robinson	SG	31	1	328	48	30	11	4	93	10.6	1.5	1.0	.4	.1	3.0
Matt Carroll	SG	25	0	430	60	17	17	2	224	17.2	2.4	.7	.7	.1	9.0
Jamal Sampson	PF	23	0	329	122	8	4	17	79	14.3	5.3	.3	.2	.7	3.4
Malik Allen^{†}	PF	22	1	271	47	7	5	11	111	12.3	2.1	.3	.2	.5	5.0
Jahidi White	C	17	0	135	34	1	2	12	42	7.9	2.0	.1	.1	.7	2.5
Cory Alexander	SG	16	1	201	29	37	9	1	49	12.6	1.8	2.3	.6	.1	3.1
Eddie House^{†}	SG	13	5	300	19	24	24	3	144	23.1	1.5	1.8	1.8	.2	11.1
Tamar Slay	SG	8	0	78	14	3	5	0	28	9.8	1.8	.4	.6	.0	3.5

- ^{†} Denotes player spent time with another team in the season. Stats reflect time with the Bobcats only.

== Awards and records ==
Rookie of the Year

- Emeka Okafor

NBA All-Rookie First Team

- Emeka Okafor
