= Jared Reiner =

American basketball player (born 1982)

Personal information
- Born: April 8, 1982 (age 44) Mitchell, South Dakota, U.S.
- Listed height: 6 ft 11 in (2.11 m)
- Listed weight: 255 lb (116 kg)

Career information
- High school: Tripp-Delmont (Tripp, South Dakota)
- College: Iowa (2000–2004)
- NBA draft: 2004: undrafted
- Playing career: 2004–2011
- Position: Center
- Number: 35, 55

Career history
- 2004–2005: Chicago Bulls
- 2006–2007: Sioux Falls Skyforce
- 2007: Milwaukee Bucks
- 2007–2008: Polaris World Murcia
- 2008: Brose Baskets
- 2008–2009: Eisbären Bremerhaven
- 2009–2010: Fort Wayne Mad Ants
- 2010: Gallitos de Isabela
- 2010–2011: BBC Bayreuth

Career highlights
- All-NBA D-League Second Team (2007)
- Stats at NBA.com
- Stats at Basketball Reference

Jared Thomas Reiner (born April 8, 1982) is an American former professional basketball player who had a brief National Basketball Association (NBA) career.

== Early life ==
Reiner was born in Mitchell, South Dakota on April 8, 1982, and was raised in the town of Tripp, South Dakota, population 804. Reiner's mother, Joanne, raised Jared and his two brothers, Matt and Ryan, after his father, Glen, died of leukemia in 1989.

By the end of first grade, Reiner had earned a black belt in Tae-kwon-do. Reiner placed seventh in the nation at Hershey Track Meet in Hershey, Pennsylvania in the softball throw at age 10.

Reiner attended Tripp-Delmont School during all of grade school and junior high. He attended Freeman High School in Freeman, SD during his freshman year of high school and along with his brother Ryan, was a member of the State 9A football Championship team and runner-up to the State B Basketball team.

Upon returning to Tripp-Delmont High School in 1997, he started on both offense and defense as a sophomore on Class 9B Football State Champion team. Again, he played alongside his older brother Ryan.

He was Tripp-Delmont High School valedictorian in 2000.

== Basketball career ==
Reiner was a Class B Boys Basketball State Runner-up as a Freshman at Freeman High School.

As a senior at Tripp-Delmont High School he won the Spirit of Su award which is given annually at South Dakota State Tournament to the individual who best portrays SuAnne Big Crow's personality traits. These qualities are athletic accomplishment, academic excellence and community involvement. After receiving the award at half-time of championship game, he went on to lead his team to victory over Castlewood High School to win 2000 South Dakota Boys State B Championship.

Reiner was named Player of the Year in South Dakota by USA Today, Gatorade, the Argus Leader (Sioux Falls, SD), the Mitchell (SD) Daily Leader, Rivals.com. He was named first team all-state and all-conference as junior and senior. Reiner competed in the Capital Classic in Washington, D.C. following his senior season and traveled with Team USA to Germany for the Albert Schweitzer Games.

Reiner played collegiately at the University of Iowa, where he won the 2001 Big Ten Men's Basketball Tournament Title and 2002 Big Ten Men's Tournament Runner-up. He led the Big Ten Conference in rebounding as a junior and was voted honorable mention all Big Ten.

His senior season was cut short due to a misdiagnosed foot injury which resulted in a season-ending surgery. He ranks number 7 in career blocks at University of Iowa. He was named Academic all-Big Ten in 2000–01, 2001–02, 2002–03, and 2003–04.

Reiner went undrafted and signed with the Chicago Bulls in 2004-05. He played sparingly as a back-up center but started two games. In 19 games for the Bulls, he averaged 1.1 points and two rebounds per game.

In 2005–06, Reiner went to camp with the Los Angeles Clippers and - in his own words - "was released on the tarmac" at the end of training camp. Claimed off waivers by the Phoenix Suns, his season ended with another misdiagnosed knee injury, however, and he had surgeries in January and February in 2006, being released shortly after without making a single appearance.

Reiner played on the 2006 summer league team for the Seattle SuperSonics, then went to training camp with the San Antonio Spurs; yet, he was waived again, on October 20, 2006. Reiner then played for the Sioux Falls Skyforce of the NBA's Development League, averaging 13.9 points, 8.8 rebounds and 1.5 assists, being was voted to the D-League All-Star Game. He was also voted to All D-League Second Team.

On February 8, 2007, Reiner signed a 10-day contract with the Milwaukee Bucks, being signed until the end of the season on March 1.

On July 24, 2007, Jared chose to not wait for an NBA contact during free agency and moved to Spain with his wife and signed with Polaris World Murcia, in the Spanish first division. In February 2008, he then moved to Brose Baskets Bamberg in Germany BBL where he helped team to the Playoffs.

During 2008-09's preseason, Reiner appeared for the Philadelphia 76ers, but was again waived prior to the season's tip-off. Shortly after Reiner signed for BBL club Eisbären Bremerhaven.

During 2009-10's preseason, Jared played with the Minnesota Timberwolves only to be released after Nathan Jawai was traded to Minnesota Timberwolves from Dallas Mavericks a few short days before regular season began. He played in Fort Wayne Mad Ants before being signed by Gallitos de Isabela in Puerto Rico in May 2010 where he helped team reach playoffs.

In August 2010, Jared signed in Germany BBL with BBC Bayreuth. He led the team in scoring, rebounding, and efficiency for the 2010–11 season.

== Career statistics ==
Legend
GP	Games played	GS	Games started	MPG	Minutes per game
FG%	Field goal percentage	3P%	3-point field goal percentage	FT%	Free throw percentage
RPG	Rebounds per game	APG	Assists per game	SPG	Steals per game
BPG	Blocks per game	PPG	Points per game	**Bold**	Career high

=== NBA ===
==== Regular season ====
Year	Team	GP	GS	MPG	FG%	3P%	FT%	RPG	APG	SPG	BPG	PPG
2004–05	Chicago	19	**2**	6.9	.333	–	.250	2.0	.1	**.2**	**.4**	1.1
2006–07	Milwaukee	**27**	**2**	**9.0**	**.349**	–	**.300**	**2.6**	**.5**	**.2**	.2	**1.2**
Career		46	4	8.2	.342	–	.286	2.4	.3	.2	.3	1.2

==== Playoffs ====
Year	Team	GP	GS	MPG	FG%	3P%	FT%	RPG	APG	SPG	BPG	PPG
2005	Chicago	3	0	2.3	.000	–	–	1.0	.0	.0	.0	.0
