= 2004–05 New York Knicks season =

Season of National Basketball Association team the New York Knicks

- Head coach: Lenny Wilkens (resigned); Herb Williams
- General manager: Isiah Thomas
- Owners: Cablevision
- Arena: Madison Square Garden

Results
- Record: 33–49 (.402)
- Place: Division: 4th (Atlantic); Conference: 11th (Eastern)
- Playoff finish: Did not qualify
- Stats at Basketball Reference

Local media
- Television: MSG Network
- Radio: WFAN

The 2004–05 New York Knicks season was the 59th season for the team in the National Basketball Association (NBA). During the offseason, the Knicks acquired Jamal Crawford from the Chicago Bulls. Early in the season, the team released Shandon Anderson after he had played one game; Anderson later joined the Miami Heat as a free agent. The Knicks played around .500 with a 16–13 start, but then lost 16 of their next 18 games. Head coach Lenny Wilkens resigned after a 17–22 start, and was replaced by assistant Herb Williams for the remainder of the season. The Knicks then lost nine straight games between March and April, finishing fourth place in the Atlantic Division with a 33–49 record, and failing to qualify for the NBA playoffs.

In his first full season with the Knicks, Stephon Marbury led the team with 21.7 points, 8.1 assists and 1.5 steals per game, and Jamal Crawford finished second on the team in scoring, averaging 17.7 points per game. Following the season, Larry Brown was hired as coach, Kurt Thomas was traded to the Phoenix Suns, Tim Thomas was dealt to the Chicago Bulls, and Allan Houston, who played just 20 games due to injury, retired after 12 seasons in the NBA.

== NBA draft ==
Round	Pick	Player	Position	Nationality	School/Club team
2	44	Trevor Ariza	F	United States	UCLA

== Roster ==
2004–05 New York Knicks roster
Players

Pos.	No.	Player	Height	Weight	DOB	From
SF	21	Trevor Ariza	6 ft 8 in (2.03 m)	210 lb (95 kg)	1985-06-30	UCLA
C	45	Jackie Butler	6 ft 10 in (2.08 m)	265 lb (120 kg)	1985-03-10	Coastal Christian Academy
SG	11	Jamal Crawford	6 ft 5 in (1.96 m)	200 lb (91 kg)	1980-03-20	Michigan
SF	1	Penny Hardaway	6 ft 7 in (2.01 m)	195 lb (88 kg)	1971-07-18	Memphis
SG	20	Allan Houston	6 ft 6 in (1.98 m)	205 lb (93 kg)	1971-04-20	Tennessee
SG	8	Jermaine Jackson	6 ft 4 in (1.93 m)	204 lb (93 kg)	1976-06-07	Detroit Mercy
PG	3	Stephon Marbury	6 ft 2 in (1.88 m)	205 lb (93 kg)	1977-02-20	Georgia Tech
PF	13	Malik Rose	6 ft 7 in (2.01 m)	250 lb (113 kg)	1974-11-23	Drexel
C	14	Bruno Šundov	7 ft 2 in (2.18 m)	220 lb (100 kg)	1980-02-10	The Winchendon School (HS)
C	50	Mike Sweetney	6 ft 8 in (2.03 m)	295 lb (134 kg)	1982-10-25	Georgetown
C	2	Maurice Taylor	6 ft 9 in (2.06 m)	265 lb (120 kg)	1976-10-30	Michigan
PF	40	Kurt Thomas	6 ft 9 in (2.06 m)	240 lb (109 kg)	1972-10-04	TCU
SF	5	Tim Thomas	6 ft 10 in (2.08 m)	240 lb (109 kg)	1977-02-26	Villanova
SF	31	Jerome Williams	6 ft 9 in (2.06 m)	206 lb (93 kg)	1973-05-10	Georgetown

Coaches
Head coach
- Lenny Wilkens (resigned)
- Herb Williams
Assistant(s)
- Mark Aguirre
- Greg Brittenham
- George Glymph
- Dick Helm
- Michael Malone

Legend
- (DP) Unsigned draft pick
- (FA) Free agent
- (S) Suspended
- Injured

Roster
Updated: May 15, 2005

== Regular season ==
Atlantic Division	W	L	PCT	GB	Home	Road	Div
y-Boston Celtics	45	37	.549	–	27–14	18–23	8–8
x-Philadelphia 76ers	43	39	.524	2	25–16	18–23	8–8
x-New Jersey Nets	42	40	.512	3	24–17	18–23	11–5
e-New York Knicks	33	49	.402	12	22–19	11–30	6–10
e-Toronto Raptors	33	49	.402	12	22–19	11–30	7–9

Eastern Conference
#	Team	W	L	PCT	GB
1	c-Miami Heat	59	23	.720	–
2	y-Detroit Pistons	54	28	.659	5
3	y-Boston Celtics	45	37	.549	14
4	x-Chicago Bulls	47	35	.573	12
5	x-Washington Wizards	45	37	.549	14
6	x-Indiana Pacers	44	38	.537	15
7	x-Philadelphia 76ers	43	39	.524	16
8	x-New Jersey Nets	42	40	.512	17
9	e-Cleveland Cavaliers	42	40	.512	17
10	e-Orlando Magic	36	46	.439	23
11	e-New York Knicks	33	49	.402	26
12	e-Toronto Raptors	33	49	.402	26
13	e-Milwaukee Bucks	30	52	.366	29
14	e-Charlotte Bobcats	18	64	.220	41
15	e-Atlanta Hawks	13	69	.159	46

== Player statistics ==
Legend
GP	Games played	GS	Games started	MPG	Minutes per game
FG%	Field-goal percentage	3P%	3-point field-goal percentage	FT%	Free-throw percentage
RPG	Rebounds per game	APG	Assists per game	SPG	Steals per game
BPG	Blocks per game	PPG	Points per game

=== Regular season ===
Player	GP	GS	MPG	FG%	3P%	FT%	RPG	APG	SPG	BPG	PPG
Shandon Anderson^{†}	1	0	20.0	.000	.000		1.0	.0	.0	.0	.0
Trevor Ariza	80	12	17.3	.442	.231	.695	3.0	1.1	.9	.2	5.9
Vin Baker^{†}	24	0	8.0	.342	.000	.467	1.5	.4	.1	.2	1.4
Jamison Brewer	18	0	10.3	.297	.200	.462	1.2	.7	.4	.1	1.7
Jackie Butler	3	0	1.7	1.000		1.000	.0	.0	.3	.0	3.3
Jamal Crawford	70	67	38.4	.398	.361	.843	2.9	4.3	1.3	.3	17.7
Penny Hardaway	37	0	24.2	.423	.300	.739	2.4	2.0	.8	.1	7.3
Allan Houston	20	11	26.6	.415	.388	.837	1.2	2.1	.4	.1	11.9
Jermaine Jackson	21	0	11.0	.515	.000	.615	1.1	1.1	.3	.0	2.0
Stephon Marbury	82	82	40.0	.462	.354	.834	3.0	8.1	1.5	.1	21.7
Nazr Mohammed^{†}	54	54	28.1	.509	.000	.708	8.1	.5	1.0	1.0	10.9
Moochie Norris^{†}	32	0	10.0	.344	.000	.818	1.3	1.1	.5	.1	2.6
Malik Rose^{†}	26	4	23.6	.425	.167	.782	4.4	.7	.6	.3	8.3
Bruno Šundov	21	0	3.5	.297	.333	1.000	.6	.1	.1	.1	1.2
Michael Sweetney	77	28	19.6	.531	.000	.749	5.4	.6	.4	.4	8.4
Maurice Taylor^{†}	27	0	16.0	.494	.000	.558	3.4	.5	.4	.3	6.5
Kurt Thomas	80	80	35.7	.471	.500	.786	10.4	2.0	.9	1.0	11.5
Tim Thomas	71	68	27.3	.439	.409	.786	3.3	1.5	.6	.2	12.0
Jerome Williams	79	4	15.3	.502	.000	.669	3.6	.5	.7	.1	4.5

- ^{†} Denotes player spent time with another team in the season. Stats reflect time with the Knicks only.

== See also ==
- 2004–05 NBA season
