= Aaron Williams (basketball) =

American basketball player (born 1971)

Personal information
- Born: October 2, 1971 (age 55) Evanston, Illinois, U.S.
- Listed height: 6 ft 9 in (2.06 m)
- Listed weight: 235 lb (107 kg)

Career information
- High school: Rolling Meadows (Rolling Meadows, Illinois)
- College: Xavier (1989–1993)
- NBA draft: 1993: undrafted
- Playing career: 1993–2008
- Position: Power forward / center
- Number: 33, 44, 55, 15, 34

Career history
- 1993: Grand Rapids Hoops
- 1993: Utah Jazz
- 1993–1994: Aresium Milan
- 1994–1995: Milwaukee Bucks
- 1995–1996: KK Split
- 1996: Connecticut Pride
- 1996–1997: Denver Nuggets
- 1997: Connecticut Pride
- 1997: Vancouver Grizzlies
- 1997–1999: Seattle SuperSonics
- 1999–2000: Washington Wizards
- 2000–2004: New Jersey Nets
- 2004–2006: Toronto Raptors
- 2006: New Orleans/Oklahoma City Hornets
- 2006–2008: Los Angeles Clippers

Career highlights
- CBA All-Rookie Second Team (1994)

Career NBA statistics
- Points: 4,120 (5.8 ppg)
- Rebounds: 2,790 (3.9 rpg)
- Blocks: 539 (0.8 bpg)
- Stats at NBA.com
- Stats at Basketball Reference

Aaron Scott Williams (born October 2, 1971) is an American former professional basketball player who played fourteen seasons in the National Basketball Association (NBA). He played at the power forward and center positions.

== Basketball career ==
Williams was undrafted after a college career at Xavier University, and played for the NBA's Utah Jazz, Milwaukee Bucks, Denver Nuggets, Vancouver Grizzlies, Seattle SuperSonics, Washington Wizards, New Jersey Nets, Toronto Raptors, New Orleans/Oklahoma City Hornets and Los Angeles Clippers. He also had brief stints in the Continental Basketball Association, Italy and Greece (Ampelokipoi B.C.). Williams was selected to the CBA All-Rookie Second Team in 1994.

In 2000–01, as a member of the New Jersey Nets, Williams posted his best numbers as a pro, playing all 82 games while averaging 10.1 points and 7.2 rebounds per game, but also had the dubious distinction of leading the league in total personal fouls committed, with 319 (an average of 3.89 fouls per game).

On December 17, 2004, he was traded by the Nets to the Toronto Raptors along with Alonzo Mourning, Eric Williams, and two first round draft picks in exchange for Vince Carter.

On January 31, 2006, he was traded by the Raptors to the New Orleans/Oklahoma City Hornets in exchange for two second-round draft picks. On July 31, Williams signed a free agent contract with the Los Angeles Clippers. On March 28, 2008, after rarely having been used throughout two seasons, he was waived.

After a professional career spanning 15 years, he spent part of the 2011–12 season as a temporary assistant men's basketball coach at his alma mater, Xavier University in Cincinnati, Ohio.

== Career statistics ==
Legend
GP	Games played	GS	Games started	MPG	Minutes per game
FG%	Field goal percentage	3P%	3-point field goal percentage	FT%	Free throw percentage
RPG	Rebounds per game	APG	Assists per game	SPG	Steals per game
BPG	Blocks per game	PPG	Points per game	**Bold**	Career high
*	Led the league

=== NBA ===
==== Regular season ====
Year	Team	GP	GS	MPG	FG%	3P%	FT%	RPG	APG	SPG	BPG	PPG
1993–94	Utah	6	0	2.0	.250	.000	.000	0.5	0.2	0.0	0.0	0.7
1994–95	Milwaukee	15	0	4.8	.333	.000	.667	1.3	0.0	0.1	0.4	1.6
1996–97	Denver	1	0	10.0	**.600**	.000	.000	5.0	0.0	0.0	**3.0**	6.0
1996–97	Vancouver	32	1	17.3	.573	.000	.673	4.3	0.5	0.5	0.8	6.2
1997–98	Seattle	65	9	11.6	.523	.000	.776	2.3	0.2	0.3	0.6	4.6
1998–99	Seattle	40	2	11.5	.423	.000	.730	3.2	0.6	0.4	0.6	4.0
1999–00	Washington	81	0	19.1	.522	.000	.726	5.0	0.7	0.5	1.1	7.6
2000–01	New Jersey	**82**	**25**	**28.5**	.457	.000	.787	**7.2**	**1.1**	**0.7**	1.4	**10.2**
2001–02	New Jersey	**82**	13	18.9	.526	.000	.699	4.1	0.9	0.4	0.9	7.2
2002–03	New Jersey	81	0	19.7	.453	.000	.785	4.1	**1.1**	0.3	0.7	6.2
2003–04	New Jersey	72	7	18.6	.503	**.333**	.677	4.1	**1.1**	0.5	0.6	6.3
2004–05	New Jersey	19	0	7.9	.519	.000	**.900**	1.6	0.3	0.2	0.3	1.9
2004–05	Toronto	23	4	7.2	.417	.000	.857	1.3	0.1	0.0	0.1	1.6
2005–06	Toronto	14	3	7.1	.526	.000	.833	1.1	0.1	0.3	0.2	1.8
2005–06	New Orleans/Oklahoma City	34	2	20.4	.516	.000	.673	4.9	0.5	0.4	0.5	5.8
2006–07	Los Angeles	38	7	9.8	.547	.000	.818	2.2	0.2	0.2	0.4	2.0
2007–08	Los Angeles	30	5	9.9	.491	.000	.778	2.0	0.3	0.4	0.5	2.3
Career		715	78	16.8	.493	.063	.740	3.9	0.7	0.4	0.8	5.8

==== Playoffs ====
Year	Team	GP	GS	MPG	FG%	3P%	FT%	RPG	APG	SPG	BPG	PPG
1997–98	Seattle	3	0	2.3	.000	.000	**1.000**	0.3	0.0	0.0	0.3	0.7
2001–02	New Jersey	**20***	0	**20.8**	.479	.000	.826	3.5	0.8	**0.4**	0.8	**6.5**
2002–03	New Jersey	19	0	17.9	.472	.000	.742	**4.6**	**0.9**	0.3	**0.9**	**6.5**
2003–04	New Jersey	11	0	13.5	**.545**	.000	.600	2.0	0.4	0.0	0.6	3.8
Career		53	0	17.2	.479	.000	.775	3.4	0.7	0.3	0.8	5.6

=== College ===
Year	Team	GP	GS	MPG	FG%	3P%	FT%	RPG	APG	SPG	BPG	PPG
1989–90	Xavier	28	1	9.9	.574	.000	.400	2.7	0.2	0.2	1.0	2.2
1990–91	Xavier	**32**	–	26.8	.536	.000	.714	6.5	1.0	**0.8**	1.8	9.7
1991–92	Xavier	27	–	**29.1**	**.585**	.000	.699	**8.0**	1.1	0.6	**2.1**	**13.9**
1992–93	Xavier	30	**20**	28.1	.543	.000	**.777**	7.1	**1.8**	0.7	1.8	10.9
Career		117	21	23.6	.556	.000	.707	6.1	1.1	0.6	1.7	9.2
