= 2004–05 Toronto Raptors season =

NBA professional basketball team season

- Head coach: Sam Mitchell
- General manager: Rob Babcock
- Owners: Maple Leaf Sports & Entertainment
- Arena: Air Canada Centre

Results
- Record: 33–49 (.402)
- Place: Division: 4th (Atlantic); Conference: 11th (Eastern)
- Playoff finish: Did not qualify
- Stats at Basketball Reference

Local media
- Television: Rogers Sportsnet; Raptors NBA TV; TSN; The Score
- Radio: CJCL

The 2004–05 Toronto Raptors season was the Raptors' tenth season in the National Basketball Association. A new management team of head coach Sam Mitchell, and General Manager Rob Babcock was hired before the 2004–05 season by the Raptors. On December 17, 2004, disgruntled All-Star Vince Carter was traded to the New Jersey Nets for Eric Williams, Aaron Williams, and Alonzo Mourning. Mourning would never report to Toronto and he was waived not long after the trade. He later signed with the Miami Heat for his second stint. Guard Alvin Williams missed the entire season due to right knee inflammation. The Raptors finished fourth in the Atlantic Division with a 33–49 record, which was the same record as the previous season. Sophomore star Chris Bosh showed improvement averaging 16.8 points and 8.9 rebounds per game.

This season marked the end of the Vince Carter era and began the Chris Bosh era in Toronto and the Raptors' first season without Carter on the roster since the 1997–98 season. Carter, now as a Net, returned to Toronto on April 15, 2005. He was booed by the Toronto crowd during starting lineups and whenever he touched the ball. This tradition continued until 2015, where he has since played for the Phoenix Suns, Orlando Magic, Dallas Mavericks, Memphis Grizzlies, Sacramento Kings, the Atlanta Hawks.

== Offseason ==
In the NBA draft, the Raptors selected Rafael Araújo and Albert Miralles. Miralles was traded to the Miami Heat for Pape Sow and a 2005 2nd round draft pick on draft day. Araújo would only play three seasons in the NBA: two with the Raptors, and one with the Utah Jazz.

Over the offseason, the Raptors signed two free agents. On July 14, they signed Rafer Alston, and on August 18, they signed Loren Woods.

=== Draft picks ===
| Round | Pick | Player | Position | Nationality | College |
|---|---|---|---|---|---|
| 1 | 8 | Rafael Araújo | Center | Brazil | BYU |
| 2 | 39 | Albert Miralles (Traded to Miami) | Power Forward | Spain | Roseto Basket (Italy) |

== Roster ==
Toronto Raptors roster
Players

| Pos. | No. | Player | Height | Weight | DOB | From |
|---|---|---|---|---|---|---|
| PG | 11 | Rafer Alston | 6 ft 2 in (1.88 m) | 171 lb (78 kg) | 1976-07-24 | Fresno State |
| C | 55 | Rafael Araújo | 6 ft 11 in (2.11 m) | 280 lb (127 kg) | 1980-08-12 | BYU |
| C | 16 | Matt Bonner | 6 ft 10 in (2.08 m) | 235 lb (107 kg) | 1980-04-05 | Florida |
| PF | 4 | Chris Bosh | 6 ft 11 in (2.11 m) | 235 lb (107 kg) | 1984-03-24 | Georgia Tech |
| PG | 1 | Omar Cook | 6 ft 1 in (1.85 m) | 190 lb (86 kg) | 1982-01-28 | St. John's |
| PF | 42 | Donyell Marshall | 6 ft 9 in (2.06 m) | 245 lb (111 kg) | 1973-05-18 | Connecticut |
| SF | 21 | Lamond Murray | 6 ft 7 in (2.01 m) | 236 lb (107 kg) | 1973-04-20 | California |
| PG | 10 | Milt Palacio | 6 ft 4 in (1.93 m) | 210 lb (95 kg) | 1978-02-07 | Colorado State |
| SG | 24 | Morris Peterson | 6 ft 7 in (2.01 m) | 220 lb (100 kg) | 1977-08-26 | Michigan State |
| SF | 5 | Jalen Rose | 6 ft 8 in (2.03 m) | 215 lb (98 kg) | 1973-01-30 | Michigan |
| C | 9 | Pape Sow | 6 ft 10 in (2.08 m) | 250 lb (113 kg) | 1981-11-22 | Cal State Fullerton |
| C | 34 | Aaron Williams | 6 ft 9 in (2.06 m) | 220 lb (100 kg) | 1971-10-02 | Xavier |
| G | 20 | Alvin Williams (injured) | 6 ft 5 in (1.96 m) | 185 lb (84 kg) | 1974-08-06 | Villanova |
| SG | 17 | Eric Williams | 6 ft 8 in (2.03 m) | 220 lb (100 kg) | 1972-07-17 | Providence |
| C | 3 | Loren Woods | 7 ft 1 in (2.16 m) | 245 lb (111 kg) | 1978-06-21 | Arizona |

Coaches
Head coach
- Sam Mitchell
Assistant(s)
- Alex English
- Jim Todd
- Jay Triano

Legend
- (DP) Unsigned draft pick
- (FA) Free agent
- (S) Suspended
- Injured

Roster
Updated: April 9, 2005

=== Roster notes ===
- Guard Alvin Williams missed the entire season due to a knee injury.

== Regular season ==
The Raptors started the season well, winning their first three games. On November 9, they lost against the Sacramento Kings, but they would win the next game against the Utah Jazz. the Raptors then suffered a five-game losing streak, which was snapped when they won against the San Antonio Spurs on November 21. They would lose against the Washington Wizards on November 23, and the next day, they would win against the New York Knicks. They would lose two straight games against the Knicks and the Wizards, and they would win their last game of the month of November against the Miami Heat. At the end of November, the Raptors had a 7–9 record.

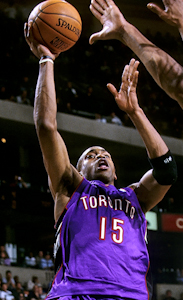
Vince Carter was traded to the New Jersey Nets in December.

December was the team's worst month of the season, winning 20% of their games. They started the month with a seven-game losing streak which ended on the 15th with a win against the Minnesota Timberwolves. On the 17th, Vince Carter was traded to the New Jersey Nets for Alonzo Mourning, Aaron Williams, Eric Williams, a 2005 1st round draft pick, and a 2006 1st round draft pick. The same day, the Raptors played against the Indiana Pacers and lost. Aaron Williams, Eric Williams, and Mourning did not play the game due to a pending physical. Ironically, the next game (on December 19) was against the New Jersey Nets. However, Vince Carter did not play in this game. The Raptors beat the Nets 110–99. The next day, the Raptors lost to the Houston Rockets. On December 22, the Raptors beat the Utah Jazz. To end the month, the Raptors went on a 3-game losing streak against the Phoenix Suns, the Los Angeles Lakers, and the Golden State Warriors. At the end of the month, the Raptors had a 10–21 record, and during the month of December, they were 0–10 on the road.

January was the team's best month of the season, and they won eight of the 14 games they played during the month. They won two games in a row against the Orlando Magic and the Sacramento Kings to begin the month, and they lost on January 7 against the Milwaukee Bucks. They once again won two games in a row, beating the Golden State Warriors on the 9th, and the Boston Celtics on the 12th. In the game against the Celtics, Morris Peterson scored a team-season high of 37 points. They were defeated by the Philadelphia 76ers on the 14th. The Raptors then went on a three-game winning streak, which would be ended by a loss against the Wizards on the 21st. They won against the Charlotte Bobcats on the 23rd, and they would end the month with a three-game losing streak. At the end of the month, the Raptors had an 18–27 record.

In February, the team once again won more than 50% of their games played in the month. In every game played during February, either Chris Bosh or Jalen Rose was the team's leading scorer. The team started February by winning two consecutive games: the first against the Indiana Pacers, and the second against the Wizards. The Raptors then lost four games in a row against the Dallas Mavericks, the Cleveland Cavaliers, the Milwaukee Bucks, and the Philadelphia 76ers. On February 11, the team waived Alonzo Mourning. He would sign with the Miami Heat on March 1, marking his second tenure with the Heat. The Raptors won on February 13 against the Los Angeles Clippers, which would be followed by a loss to the Chicago Bulls on the 16th. The team ended the month with a three-game winning streak, and their record at the end of the month was 24–32.

In March, the Raptors won a third of their games played during the month. They started the month with back-to-back losses against the San Antonio Spurs and the Memphis Grizzlies. They then won against the New Orleans Hornets on the 6th. The next day, the Raptors lost to the Dallas Mavericks, which was followed by a win against the Orlando Magic. On the 11th, they lost against the Atlanta Hawks. On the 13th, they won against the 76ers. They lost two consecutive games against the Celtics and the Detroit Pistons. On the 20th, the Raptors won against the Cleveland Cavaliers. The Raptors then lost two straight games against the Chicago Bulls and the 76ers. They won against Atlanta on the 26th, and the Raptors ended the month with two losses against the Miami Heat and the Orlando Magic. At the end of the month, the Raptors' record was 29–42.

"Boos are boos. You notice it when you get out there, but my focus was on getting the job done and trying to get a win. This game wasn't for bragging rights, this was for the opportunity to get into the playoffs, get one step closer to the playoffs."

-Vince Carter

In April, the Raptors had a mediocre month. Having a 4–7 record for games played in April, they were successful on the road, but they were unsuccessful at home. Their first game of the month was a win against the Charlotte Bobcats. They would then lose two games against the Pistons and the Grizzlies. On April 8, the Raptors won against the Hawks, which was also followed by two straight losses to the Bulls and the Pacers. On April 12, the Raptors won against the New York Knicks, which was again followed by two consecutive losses, which were to the Nets and the Celtics. In the April 15 home game against the Nets, Vince Carter returned to Toronto to face his former team. As the starting lineups were announced, Carter was booed by Raptors fans. On April 19, the Raptors won against the Milwaukee Bucks, and they lost the last game of the season against the Cleveland Cavaliers on April 20. At the end of the regular season, the Raptors had a 33–49 record, and they missed the playoffs.

=== Standings ===
| Atlantic Division | W | L | PCT | GB | Home | Road | Div |
|---|---|---|---|---|---|---|---|
| y-Boston Celtics | 45 | 37 | .549 | – | 27–14 | 18–23 | 8–8 |
| x-Philadelphia 76ers | 43 | 39 | .524 | 2 | 25–16 | 18–23 | 8–8 |
| x-New Jersey Nets | 42 | 40 | .512 | 3 | 24–17 | 18–23 | 11–5 |
| e-New York Knicks | 33 | 49 | .402 | 12 | 22–19 | 11–30 | 6–10 |
| e-Toronto Raptors | 33 | 49 | .402 | 12 | 22–19 | 11–30 | 7–9 |

Eastern Conference
| # | Team | W | L | PCT | GB |
|---|---|---|---|---|---|
| 1 | c-Miami Heat | 59 | 23 | .720 | – |
| 2 | y-Detroit Pistons | 54 | 28 | .659 | 5 |
| 3 | y-Boston Celtics | 45 | 37 | .549 | 14 |
| 4 | x-Chicago Bulls | 47 | 35 | .573 | 12 |
| 5 | x-Washington Wizards | 45 | 37 | .549 | 14 |
| 6 | x-Indiana Pacers | 44 | 38 | .537 | 15 |
| 7 | x-Philadelphia 76ers | 43 | 39 | .524 | 16 |
| 8 | x-New Jersey Nets | 42 | 40 | .512 | 17 |
| 9 | e-Cleveland Cavaliers | 42 | 40 | .512 | 17 |
| 10 | e-Orlando Magic | 36 | 46 | .439 | 23 |
| 11 | e-New York Knicks | 33 | 49 | .402 | 26 |
| 12 | e-Toronto Raptors | 33 | 49 | .402 | 26 |
| 13 | e-Milwaukee Bucks | 30 | 52 | .366 | 29 |
| 14 | e-Charlotte Bobcats | 18 | 64 | .220 | 41 |
| 15 | e-Atlanta Hawks | 13 | 69 | .159 | 46 |

=== Game log ===
2004–05 game log
November: 7–9 (home: 5–2; road: 2–7)

| Game | Date | Team | Score | High points | High rebounds | High assists | Location Attendance | Record |
|---|---|---|---|---|---|---|---|---|
| 1 | November 3 | Houston | W 95–88 | Chris Bosh (20) | Rafer Alston, Chris Bosh, Loren Woods (7) | Rafer Alston (8) | Air Canada Centre; 19,800 | 1–0 |
| 2 | November 5 | Detroit | W 101–89 | Chris Bosh (18) | Loren Woods (14) | Vince Carter (5) | Air Canada Centre; 15,284 | 2–0 |
| 3 | November 7 | Portland | W 101–97 | Vince Carter (25) | Donyell Marshall (9) | Rafer Alston (8) | Air Canada Centre; 13,863 | 3–0 |
| 4 | November 9 | @ Sacramento | L 92–108 | Rafer Alston, Jalen Rose (15) | Loren Woods (11) | Milt Palacio (5) | ARCO Arena; 17,317 | 3–1 |
| 5 | November 10 | @ Utah | W 104–95 | Chris Bosh (20) | Loren Woods (9) | Vince Carter (5) | Delta Center; 19,683 | 4–1 |
| 6 | November 12 | @ Seattle | L 87–88 | Chris Bosh (19) | Chris Bosh (9) | Rafer Alston (11) | KeyArena; 15,702 | 4–2 |
| 7 | November 13 | @ Portland | L 102–105 | Rafer Alston (27) | Chris Bosh (8) | Rafer Alston (7) | Rose Garden; 16,362 | 4–3 |
| 8 | November 16 | @ L.A. Clippers | L 89–101 | Vince Carter (21) | Chris Bosh (7) | Rafer Alston (5) | Staples Center; 14,985 | 4–4 |
| 9 | November 17 | @ Denver | L 106–112 | Jalen Rose (30) | Jérôme Moïso (11) | Rafer Alston (6) | Pepsi Center; 14,818 | 4–5 |
| 10 | November 19 | Seattle | L 94–101 | Vince Carter (21) | Chris Bosh, Matt Bonner (7) | Rafer Alston (7) | Air Canada Centre; 16,886 | 4–6 |
| 11 | November 21 | San Antonio | W 96–91 | Rafer Alston, Chris Bosh (20) | Chris Bosh (10) | Rafer Alston (11) | Air Canada Centre; 17,264 | 5–6 |
| 12 | November 23 | @ Washington | L 86–102 | Vince Carter (25) | Chris Bosh, Loren Woods (10) | Rafer Alston (13) | MCI Center; 14,541 | 5–7 |
| 13 | November 24 | New York | W 114–91 | Vince Carter (22) | Loren Woods (10) | Milt Palacio (7) | Air Canada Centre; 18,192 | 6–7 |
| 14 | November 27 | @ New York | L 102–108 | Vince Carter (19) | Loren Woods (10) | Milt Palacio (8) | Madison Square Garden; 19,763 | 6–8 |
| 15 | November 28 | Washington | L 109–114 (OT) | Jalen Rose (29) | Donyell Marshall, Loren Woods (7) | Rafer Alston (8) | Air Canada Centre; 16,121 | 6–9 |
| 16 | November 30 | @ Miami | W 94–92 | Jalen Rose (24) | Chris Bosh (10) | Rafer Alston, Vince Carter (4) | American Airlines Arena; 18,993 | 7–9 |

December: 3–12 (home: 3–2; road: 0–10)

| Game | Date | Team | Score | High points | High rebounds | High assists | Location Attendance | Record |
|---|---|---|---|---|---|---|---|---|
| 17 | December 1 | @ Orlando | L 108–129 | Vince Carter (21) | Loren Woods (7) | Rafer Alston (6) | TD Waterhouse Centre; 12,175 | 7–10 |
| 18 | December 3 | @ Boston | L 89–91 | Jalen Rose (19) | Donyell Marshall (11) | Rafer Alston, Milt Palacio (4) | FleetCenter; 15,201 | 7–11 |
| 19 | December 4 | @ Cleveland | L 97–105 | Rafer Alston (20) | Chris Bosh (10) | Rafer Alston (10) | Gund Arena; 19,205 | 7–12 |
| 20 | December 6 | @ New Jersey | L 86–88 | Vince Carter (22) | Donyell Marshall (9) | Rafer Alston (8) | Continental Airlines Arena; 11,227 | 7–13 |
| 21 | December 8 | @ Detroit | L 86–90 (OT) | Donyell Marshall (22) | Donyell Marshall (15) | Rafer Alston, Milt Palacio (6) | The Palace of Auburn Hills; 22,076 | 7–14 |
| 22 | December 10 | Denver | L 87–101 | Rafer Alston (25) | Chris Bosh (8) | Rafer Alston (8) | Air Canada Centre; 17,197 | 7–15 |
| 23 | December 12 | Miami | L 98–106 | Jalen Rose (25) | Loren Woods (11) | Rafer Alston (9) | Air Canada Centre; 19,202 | 7–16 |
| 24 | December 15 | Minnesota | W 96–90 | Chris Bosh (24) | Chris Bosh (14) | Morris Peterson (4) | Air Canada Centre; 16,888 | 8–16 |
| 25 | December 17 | @ Indiana | L 86–89 | Jalen Rose (23) | Loren Woods (9) | Milt Palacio (6) | Conseco Fieldhouse; 15,357 | 8–17 |
| 26 | December 19 | New Jersey | W 110–99 | Morris Peterson (20) | Morris Peterson (6) | Rafer Alston (7) | Air Canada Centre; 16,938 | 9–17 |
| 27 | December 20 | @ Houston | L 102–114 | Chris Bosh (16) | Donyell Marshall (12) | Donyell Marshall, Milt Palacio, Eric Williams (4) | Toyota Center; 14,241 | 9–18 |
| 28 | December 22 | Utah | W 98–86 | Donyell Marshall (22) | Chris Bosh, Donyell Marshall, Eric Williams (8) | Rafer Alston (14) | Air Canada Centre; 17,479 | 10–18 |
| 29 | December 26 | @ Phoenix | L 94–106 | Jalen Rose (19) | Donyell Marshall (9) | Rafer Alston (3) | America West Arena; 18,422 | 10–19 |
| 30 | December 28 | @ L.A. Lakers | L 99–117 | Rafer Alston (13) | Rafael Araújo, Chris Bosh (10) | Rafer Alston (11) | Staples Center; 18,997 | 10–20 |
| 31 | December 29 | @ Golden State | L 105–111 | Jalen Rose (23) | Donyell Marshall (12) | Rafer Alston (9) | The Arena in Oakland; 15,279 | 10–21 |

January: 8–6 (home: 7–3; road: 1–3)

| Game | Date | Team | Score | High points | High rebounds | High assists | Location Attendance | Record |
|---|---|---|---|---|---|---|---|---|
| 32 | January 3 | Orlando | W 105–94 | Chris Bosh (25) | Chris Bosh (12) | Rafer Alston, Milt Palacio (6) | Air Canada Centre; 15,782 | 11–21 |
| 33 | January 5 | Sacramento | W 96–93 | Chris Bosh (23) | Rafael Araújo (14) | Rafer Alston (10) | Air Canada Centre; 18,288 | 12–21 |
| 34 | January 7 | Milwaukee | L 105–107 (OT) | Jalen Rose, Eric Williams (21) | Donyell Marshall (14) | Rafer Alston (8) | Air Canada Centre; 16,537 | 12–22 |
| 35 | January 9 | Golden State | W 109–87 | Chris Bosh, Morris Peterson (21) | Chris Bosh (17) | Rafer Alston (7) | Air Canada Centre; 14,372 | 13–22 |
| 36 | January 12 | Boston | W 104–93 | Morris Peterson (37) | Chris Bosh (11) | Rafer Alston, Morris Peterson (6) | Air Canada Centre; 15,108 | 14–22 |
| 37 | January 14 | @ Philadelphia | L 96–106 | Donyell Marshall (20) | Chris Bosh (13) | Rafer Alston (13) | Wachovia Center; 18,001 | 14–23 |
| 38 | January 16 | New Orleans | W 102–99 | Morris Peterson (25) | Chris Bosh, Morris Peterson (10) | Rafer Alston (7) | Air Canada Centre; 14,422 | 15–23 |
| 39 | January 17 | @ Minnesota | W 100–91 | Donyell Marshall (22) | Chris Bosh (11) | Rafer Alston (15) | Target Center; 16,632 | 16–23 |
| 40 | January 19 | New York | W 98–81 | Jalen Rose (24) | Chris Bosh (14) | Rafer Alston, Jalen Rose (5) | Air Canada Centre; 16,613 | 17–23 |
| 41 | January 21 | @ Washington | L 109–118 | Jalen Rose (32) | Morris Peterson (9) | Rafer Alston (7) | MCI Center; 15,424 | 17–24 |
| 42 | January 23 | Charlotte | W 103–92 | Morris Peterson (26) | Rafael Araújo, Chris Bosh (8) | Rafer Alston (8) | Air Canada Centre; 14,196 | 18–24 |
| 43 | January 26 | Miami | L 96–111 | Rafer Alston (29) | Lamond Murray (8) | Rafer Alston (8) | Air Canada Centre; 19,800 | 18–25 |
| 44 | January 28 | @ Charlotte | L 94–101 | Rafer Alston (20) | Jalen Rose (6) | Jalen Rose (5) | Charlotte Coliseum; 15,986 | 18–26 |
| 45 | January 30 | Phoenix | L 105–123 | Chris Bosh (27) | Matt Bonner (8) | Milt Palacio (9) | Air Canada Centre; 19,800 | 18–27 |

February: 6–5 (home: 3–4; road: 3–1)

| Game | Date | Team | Score | High points | High rebounds | High assists | Location Attendance | Record |
|---|---|---|---|---|---|---|---|---|
| 46 | February 2 | @ Indiana | W 98–97 | Chris Bosh (25) | Chris Bosh (15) | Milt Palacio (7) | Conseco Fieldhouse; 14,783 | 19–27 |
| 47 | February 4 | Washington | W 103–100 | Jalen Rose (26) | Chris Bosh (11) | Rafer Alston (8) | Air Canada Centre; 15,546 | 20–27 |
| 48 | February 6 | Dallas | L 113–122 | Chris Bosh (29) | Chris Bosh (8) | Rafer Alston (8) | Air Canada Centre; 17,896 | 20–28 |
| 49 | February 8 | @ Cleveland | L 91–104 | Jalen Rose (21) | Loren Woods (9) | Milt Palacio (9) | Gund Arena; 17,036 | 20–29 |
| 50 | February 9 | Milwaukee | L 107–110 | Jalen Rose (26) | Chris Bosh (9) | Rafer Alston (12) | Air Canada Centre; 14,269 | 20–30 |
| 51 | February 11 | Philadelphia | L 91–106 | Jalen Rose (23) | Jalen Rose (10) | Chris Bosh, Morris Peterson, Jalen Rose (5) | Air Canada Centre; 19,800 | 20–31 |
| 52 | February 13 | L.A. Clippers | W 109–106 | Chris Bosh (26) | Chris Bosh (10) | Rafer Alston (8) | Air Canada Centre; 15,721 | 21–31 |
| 53 | February 16 | Chicago | L 115–121 | Chris Bosh (28) | Chris Bosh, Jalen Rose (7) | Rafer Alston (8) | Air Canada Centre; 15,881 | 21–32 |
| 54 | February 22 | @ New Jersey | W 100–82 | Jalen Rose (30) | Chris Bosh (12) | Rafer Alston (6) | Continental Airlines Arena; 14,080 | 22–32 |
| 55 | February 25 | @ Milwaukee | W 106–102 | Chris Bosh (27) | Chris Bosh, Donyell Marshall (8) | Rafer Alston (7) | Bradley Center; 15,883 | 23–32 |
| 56 | February 27 | L.A. Lakers | W 108–102 | Jalen Rose (26) | Chris Bosh (15) | Milt Palacio (7) | Air Canada Centre; 19,800 | 24–32 |

March: 5–10 (home: 3–2; road: 2–8)

| Game | Date | Team | Score | High points | High rebounds | High assists | Location Attendance | Record |
|---|---|---|---|---|---|---|---|---|
| 57 | March 2 | @ San Antonio | L 86–92 | Chris Bosh (16) | Donyell Marshall (9) | Milt Palacio (6) | SBC Center; 17,795 | 24–33 |
| 58 | March 4 | @ Memphis | L 75–86 | Jalen Rose (19) | Donyell Marshall (9) | Morris Peterson (4) | FedExForum; 18,119 | 24–34 |
| 59 | March 6 | @ New Orleans | W 95–84 | Chris Bosh (33) | Chris Bosh (15) | Milt Palacio (9) | New Orleans Arena; 10,638 | 25–34 |
| 60 | March 7 | @ Dallas | L 105–113 | Morris Peterson (23) | Chris Bosh (8) | Rafer Alston (7) | American Airlines Center; 19,509 | 25–35 |
| 61 | March 9 | Orlando | W 106–96 | Rafer Alston, Morris Peterson (16) | Chris Bosh (15) | Jalen Rose (8) | Air Canada Centre; 17,362 | 26–35 |
| 62 | March 11 | Atlanta | L 112–116 (OT) | Jalen Rose (22) | Chris Bosh, Donyell Marshall (11) | Rafer Alston (11) | Air Canada Centre; 17,890 | 26–36 |
| 63 | March 13 | Philadelphia | W 128–110 | Donyell Marshall (38) | Chris Bosh, Donyell Marshall (10) | Morris Peterson (8) | Air Canada Centre; 19,800 | 27–36 |
| 64 | March 16 | @ Boston | L 109–110 | Jalen Rose (35) | Donyell Marshall (9) | Rafer Alston (6) | FleetCenter; 17,020 | 27–37 |
| 65 | March 18 | @ Detroit | L 92–103 | Donyell Marshall (25) | Donyell Marshall (12) | Rafer Alston, Milt Palacio (4) | The Palace of Auburn Hills; 22,076 | 27–38 |
| 66 | March 20 | Cleveland | W 105–98 | Jalen Rose (30) | Donyell Marshall (10) | Rafer Alston (4) | Air Canada Centre; 19,800 | 28–38 |
| 67 | March 23 | Chicago | L 85–94 | Jalen Rose (30) | Chris Bosh, Jalen Rose (9) | Rafer Alston (5) | Air Canada Centre; 16,974 | 28–39 |
| 68 | March 25 | @ Philadelphia | L 101–103 | Donyell Marshall (26) | Chris Bosh (22) | Rafer Alston (10) | Wachovia Center; 18,521 | 28–40 |
| 69 | March 26 | @ Atlanta | W 109–104 | Chris Bosh (32) | Chris Bosh (11) | Milt Palacio (6) | Philips Arena; 16,648 | 29–40 |
| 70 | March 29 | @ Miami | L 91–103 | Rafer Alston (19) | Chris Bosh (13) | Rafer Alston, Jalen Rose (6) | American Airlines Arena; 20,197 | 29–41 |
| 71 | March 30 | @ Orlando | L 96–108 | Rafer Alston (17) | Chris Bosh (11) | Jalen Rose (5) | TD Waterhouse Centre; 12,410 | 29–42 |

April: 4–7 (home: 1–6; road: 3–1)

| Game | Date | Team | Score | High points | High rebounds | High assists | Location Attendance | Record |
|---|---|---|---|---|---|---|---|---|
| 72 | April 1 | @ Charlotte | W 119–107 | Chris Bosh (27) | Donyell Marshall (12) | Milt Palacio, Morris Peterson, Jalen Rose (4) | Charlotte Coliseum; 13,550 | 30–42 |
| 73 | April 3 | Detroit | L 103–113 | Morris Peterson, Jalen Rose (22) | Chris Bosh (9) | Jalen Rose (5) | Air Canada Centre; 19,800 | 30–43 |
| 74 | April 6 | Memphis | L 74–104 | Jalen Rose (19) | Chris Bosh (10) | Matt Bonner, Jalen Rose (3) | Air Canada Centre; 14,964 | 30–44 |
| 75 | April 8 | Atlanta | W 109–101 (OT) | Jalen Rose (30) | Morris Peterson (14) | Rafer Alston (8) | Air Canada Centre; 14,352 | 31–44 |
| 76 | April 9 | @ Chicago | L 97–110 | Jalen Rose (19) | Chris Bosh (9) | Rafer Alston (9) | United Center; 22,281 | 31–45 |
| 77 | April 11 | Indiana | L 90–94 | Jalen Rose (26) | Chris Bosh (13) | Rafer Alston (9) | Air Canada Centre; 15,104 | 31–46 |
| 78 | April 12 | @ New York | W 105–93 | Chris Bosh (29) | Rafer Alston (9) | Rafer Alston (7) | Madison Square Garden; 18,907 | 32–46 |
| 79 | April 15 | New Jersey | L 90–101 | Jalen Rose (20) | Morris Peterson (8) | Rafer Alston (7) | Air Canada Centre; 19,800 | 32–47 |
| 80 | April 17 | Boston | L 98–103 | Jalen Rose (31) | Chris Bosh, Pape Sow (7) | Rafer Alston (6) | Air Canada Centre; 18,797 | 32–48 |
| 81 | April 19 | @ Milwaukee | W 127–109 | Jalen Rose (29) | Pape Sow (9) | Omar Cook (10) | Bradley Center; 13,947 | 33–48 |
| 82 | April 20 | Cleveland | L 95–104 | Jalen Rose (25) | Morris Peterson (9) | Omar Cook (9) | Air Canada Centre; 19,800 | 33–49 |

2004–05 season schedule

== Player statistics ==
=== Regular season ===
| Player | POS | GP | GS | MP | REB | AST | STL | BLK | PTS | MPG | RPG | APG | SPG | BPG | PPG |
|---|---|---|---|---|---|---|---|---|---|---|---|---|---|---|---|
| Morris Peterson | SG | 82 | 61 | 2,510 | 340 | 169 | 91 | 18 | 1,029 | 30.6 | 4.1 | 2.1 | 1.1 | .2 | 12.5 |
| Matt Bonner | C | 82 | 0 | 1,553 | 285 | 48 | 39 | 19 | 589 | 18.9 | 3.5 | .6 | .5 | .2 | 7.2 |
| Chris Bosh | PF | 81 | 81 | 3,017 | 718 | 153 | 76 | 113 | 1,361 | 37.2 | 8.9 | 1.9 | .9 | 1.4 | 16.8 |
| Jalen Rose | SF | 81 | 65 | 2,710 | 276 | 209 | 63 | 10 | 1,495 | 33.5 | 3.4 | 2.6 | .8 | .1 | 18.5 |
| Rafer Alston | PG | 80 | 78 | 2,717 | 279 | 514 | 118 | 7 | 1,136 | 34.0 | 3.5 | 6.4 | 1.5 | .1 | 14.2 |
| Milt Palacio | PG | 80 | 4 | 1,533 | 134 | 279 | 48 | 13 | 467 | 19.2 | 1.7 | 3.5 | .6 | .2 | 5.8 |
| Donyell Marshall | PF | 65 | 2 | 1,645 | 428 | 81 | 57 | 46 | 747 | 25.3 | 6.6 | 1.2 | .9 | .7 | 11.5 |
| Lamond Murray | SF | 62 | 1 | 918 | 164 | 47 | 32 | 16 | 371 | 14.8 | 2.6 | .8 | .5 | .3 | 6.0 |
| Rafael Araújo | C | 59 | 41 | 736 | 185 | 16 | 21 | 8 | 196 | 12.5 | 3.1 | .3 | .4 | .1 | 3.3 |
| Loren Woods | C | 45 | 30 | 712 | 220 | 17 | 8 | 39 | 176 | 15.8 | 4.9 | .4 | .2 | .9 | 3.9 |
| Eric Williams^{†} | SG | 34 | 18 | 583 | 77 | 50 | 22 | 2 | 159 | 17.1 | 2.3 | 1.5 | .6 | .1 | 4.7 |
| Pape Sow | C | 27 | 4 | 255 | 57 | 2 | 12 | 4 | 62 | 9.4 | 2.1 | .1 | .4 | .1 | 2.3 |
| Aaron Williams^{†} | C | 23 | 4 | 165 | 29 | 2 | 1 | 3 | 36 | 7.2 | 1.3 | .1 | .0 | .1 | 1.6 |
| Vince Carter^{†} | SG | 20 | 20 | 608 | 66 | 61 | 25 | 15 | 317 | 30.4 | 3.3 | 3.1 | 1.3 | .8 | 15.9 |
| Jérôme Moïso^{†} | C | 8 | 1 | 69 | 23 | 0 | 2 | 3 | 14 | 8.6 | 2.9 | .0 | .3 | .4 | 1.8 |
| Omar Cook | PG | 5 | 0 | 74 | 7 | 22 | 6 | 1 | 23 | 14.8 | 1.4 | 4.4 | 1.2 | .2 | 4.6 |

- ^{†} Denotes player spent time with another team in the season. Stats reflect time with the Raptors only.

== Transactions ==
=== Trades ===
| June 24, 2004 | To Toronto Raptors Pape Sow; 2005 2nd round draft pick To Miami Heat Albert Miralles |

| December 17, 2004 | To Toronto Raptors Alonzo Mourning; Aaron Williams; Eric Williams; 2005 1st round draft pick 2006 1st round draft pick To New Jersey Nets Vince Carter |

=== Free agents ===
Additions
| Player | Date signed | Former team |
|---|---|---|
| Rafer Alston | July 14 | Miami Heat |
| Loren Woods | August 18 | Miami Heat |
| Omar Cook | April 9 | Fayetteville Patriots (D-League) |

Subtractions
| Player | Date released | New Team |
|---|---|---|
| Alonzo Mourning | February 11 | Miami Heat |

== Award winners ==
- Chris Bosh, NBA All-Star Rookie-Sophomore Game Appearance (Sophomore)
