= Ed Tapscott =

American sports executive (born 1953)

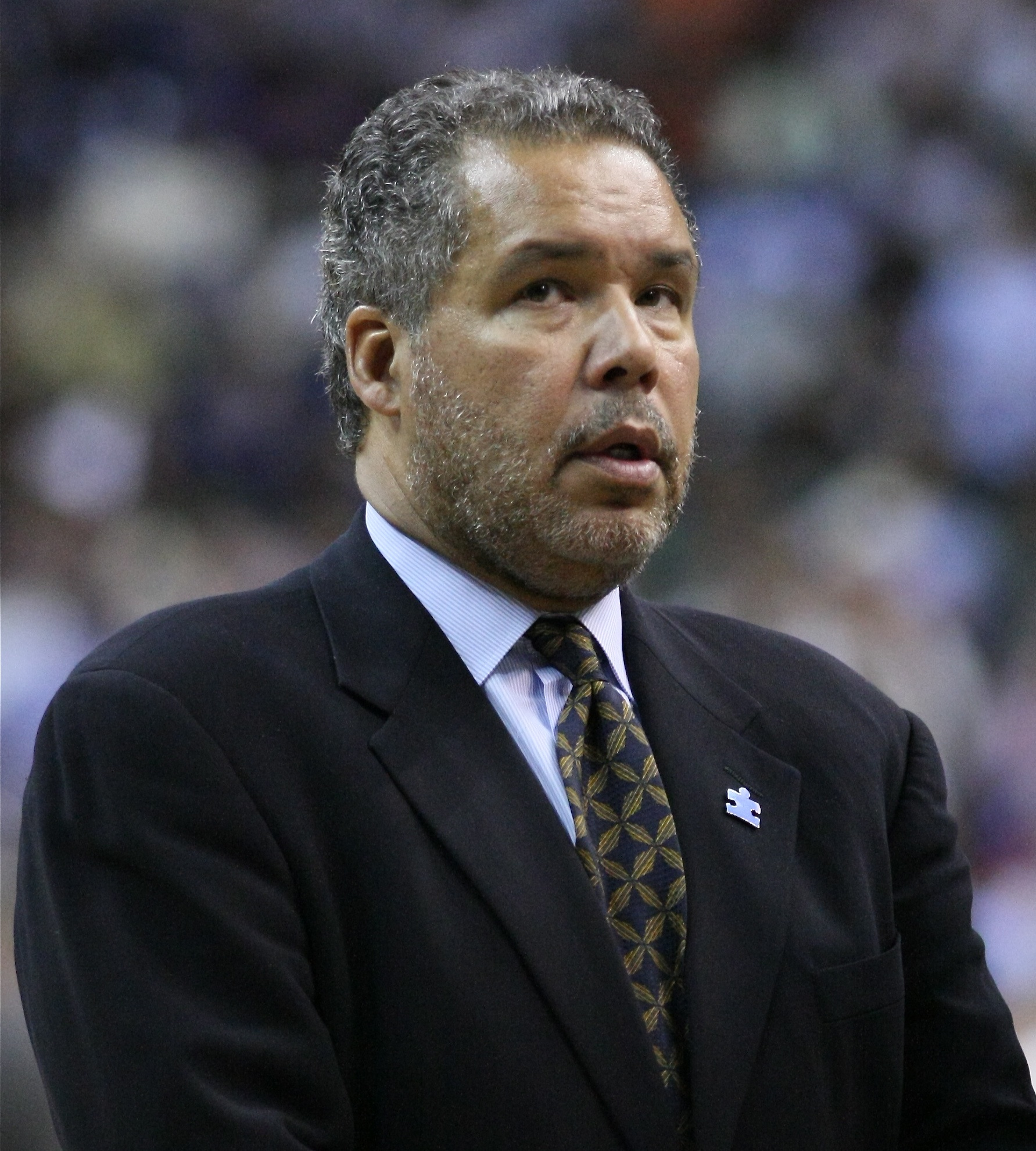
- Born: June 11, 1953 (age 73); Washington, D.C., U.S.
- Education: Tufts University (BA); American University (JD)
- Occupation: Sports Executive

Edmond A. Tapscott III (born June 11, 1953) is an American sports executive and former basketball coach. He is the former interim head coach of the NBA's Washington Wizards.

== Coaching ==
Tapscott received his bachelor's degree from Tufts University and his Juris Doctor (J.D.) from American University Washington College of Law. He was an assistant to Gary Williams at American University in the 1970s while a law student, and took over head coaching duties in 1982. By the time Tapscott left American in 1990 to finally use his J.D. as director of team sports for Advantage International (a sports marketing and management firm), he was the coach with the 2nd highest winning percentage.

He subsequently led the team to one of the program's biggest victories. On December 15, 1982, in his fifth game as coach Tapscott guided the Eagles to a 62–61 upset over its cross-town rival Georgetown who were led by Patrick Ewing and ranked fifth in the nation. The game is also notable because the Washington Cardiovascular Institute had given the coach a portable heart monitor to wear during the game, with his heart rate jumping from a pregame rate of 68 to 130 to 170 in the second half. Tapscott almost scored another upset over a highly ranked Georgetown four years later but the Reggie Williams-led Hoyas held on 62–59 and Coach John Thompson dropped American University from its schedule thereafter.

An NBA executive level professional for years, Tapscott was the first employee hired to lead the Charlotte Bobcats as Executive Vice President and Chief Operating Officer, but resigned after serving as president and chief executive officer in 2006.

Tapscott formerly worked in the New York Knicks’ front office, including a stint as interim president and general manager. He’s perhaps best remembered in New York for the 1999 drafting of French center Frédéric Weis who never played a game in the NBA, but much less credited for formulating the New York Knicks team, which culminated its season in the 1999 NBA Finals.

On November 24, 2008, Tapscott, at that time director of player development, was named as interim head coach, replacing Eddie Jordan after a dismal 1–10 start during the season. General manager of the Wizards, Ernie Grunfeld, stated that Tapscott will run the team for the rest of the season.

Tapscott made his professional coaching debut against the Golden State Warriors on November 25, 2008, a game which resulted in a win. Under Tapscott, the Wizards accrued an 18–53 record in the 2008–2009 season.

After Flip Saunders was hired as coach of the Wizards, Tapscott returned to his position as the team's director of player development.

== Head coaching record ==
Legend
Regular season	G	Games coached	W	Games won	L	Games lost	W–L %	Win–loss %
Playoffs	PG	Playoff games	PW	Playoff wins	PL	Playoff losses	PW–L %	Playoff win–loss %

Team	Year	G	W	L	W–L%	Finish	PG	PW	PL	PW–L%	Result
Washington	2008–09	71	18	53	.254	5th in Atlantic	—	—	—	—	—
Career		71	18	53	.254		—	—	—	—	
