= Kwame Brown =

American basketball player (born 1982)

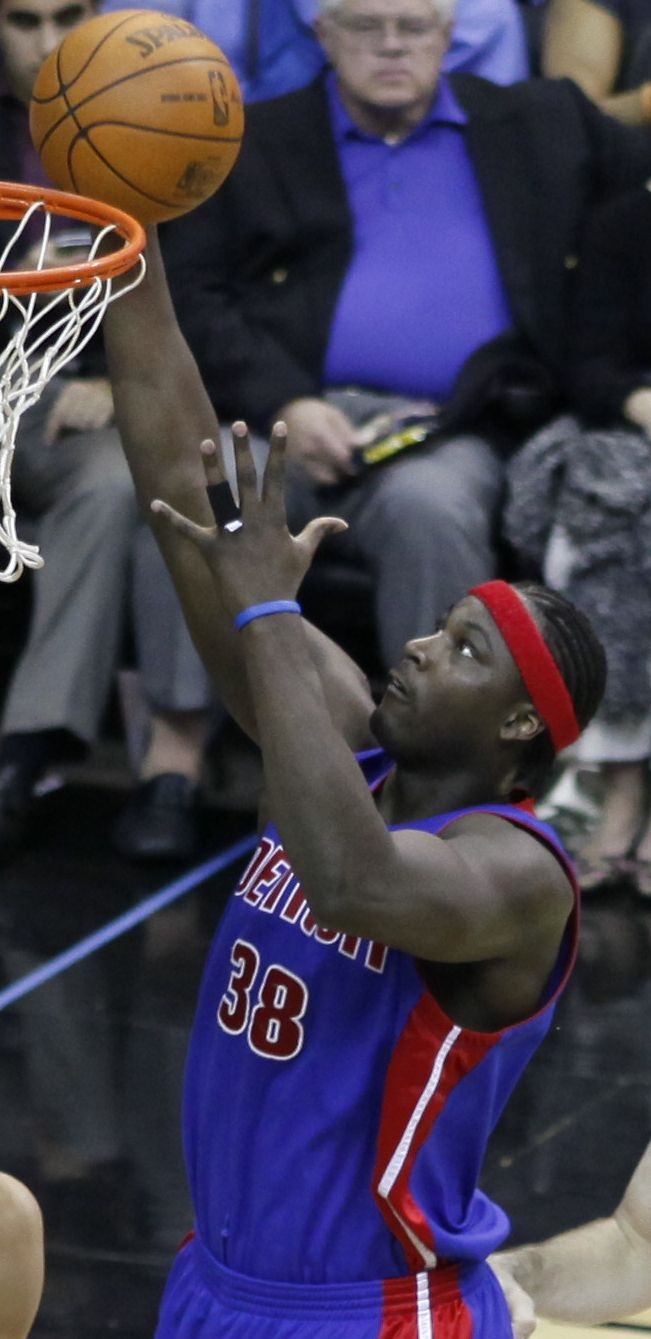
- Brown with the Detroit Pistons in 2009

Personal information
- Born: March 10, 1982 (age 44) Charleston, South Carolina, U.S.
- Listed height: 6 ft 11 in (2.11 m)
- Listed weight: 290 lb (132 kg)

Career information
- High school: Glynn Academy (Brunswick, Georgia)
- NBA draft: 2001: 1st round, 1st overall pick
- Drafted by: Washington Wizards
- Playing career: 2001–2013
- Position: Power forward / center
- Number: 5, 54, 38

Career history
- 2001–2005: Washington Wizards
- 2005–2008: Los Angeles Lakers
- 2008: Memphis Grizzlies
- 2008–2010: Detroit Pistons
- 2010–2011: Charlotte Bobcats
- 2011–2012: Golden State Warriors
- 2012–2013: Philadelphia 76ers

Career highlights
- First-team Parade All-American (2001); McDonald's All-American (2001); Mr. Georgia Basketball (2001)

Career statistics
- Points: 4,035 (6.6 ppg)
- Rebounds: 3,333 (5.5 rpg)
- Assists: 554 (0.9 apg)
- Stats at NBA.com
- Stats at Basketball Reference

Kwame Hasani Brown (born March 10, 1982) is an American former professional basketball player who spent 12 seasons in the National Basketball Association (NBA). Selected first overall by the Washington Wizards in the 2001 NBA draft, Brown was the first player to be drafted number one overall straight out of high school. He later played for the Los Angeles Lakers, Memphis Grizzlies, Detroit Pistons, Charlotte Bobcats, Golden State Warriors, and Philadelphia 76ers.

== High school ==
Brown was consistently rated as the "best high school player" in his class, which also included high school standouts Eddy Curry and Tyson Chandler. He was the high school player of the year as a senior in Georgia.

Brown finished his high school career at the historic Glynn Academy (in Brunswick, Georgia) as the school's all-time leading rebounder (1,235) and shot-blocker (605), and also finished second all-time as a scorer (1,539 points). He was named to the 2001 McDonald's All-American Team.

Brown's senior averages were 20.1 points, 13.3 rebounds, 5.8 blocks, 3 assists and 2 steals per game. While Brown was a senior, Glynn Academy produced a 24–7 record and reached the GHSA semifinals.

== Professional career ==
=== Washington Wizards (2001–2005) ===
Originally signing a letter of intent to play for the University of Florida, he later declared for the 2001 NBA draft. The Washington Wizards, under team president Michael Jordan, used their first overall pick on him. Following a pre-draft workout with the Wizards, it had been reported that Brown told then-Wizards coach Doug Collins, "If you draft me, you'll never regret it."

Perhaps as a result of hype and high expectations, Brown's rookie season was marred by a lack of maturity and production on the court. In his rookie year, Brown averaged 4.5 points and 3.5 rebounds per game.

However, the Wizards believed in Brown's potential. In his second season as a professional, Brown saw more action in the league. He started 20 out of the 80 games he played and the total minutes he played doubled.

Brown improved his numbers, posting averages of 7.4 points and 5.3 rebounds per game. In his third season, Brown continued to improve, posting career highs in both points (10.9) and rebounds (7.4). In a game against the Sacramento Kings, he registered 30 points and 19 rebounds.

After his first three years in Washington, Brown rejected a five-year, $30 million contract offer, electing instead to test the free agent market when his contract expired after the season. In his fourth season, Brown was limited to 42 games due to injuries. His highest-scoring game of the season was 19 points, compared to his season-high of 30 the year before, and he averaged 7.0 points per game. Late in the season, criticism increased; he feuded with Gilbert Arenas, other teammates, and his coach Eddie Jordan.

=== Los Angeles Lakers (2005–2008) ===
On August 2, 2005, Brown and Laron Profit were traded to the Lakers in exchange for Caron Butler and Chucky Atkins. This move was met with some controversy from fans who disliked Brown's reputation and his label as an "under-achiever." In the beginning of the season, he averaged just above 6 points and 6 rebounds.

On December 26, 2005, he played his first game at the Washington Wizards' MCI Center (now known as Capital One Arena) as a Laker. The sold-out crowd of 20,173 fans loudly booed him upon entering the game and whenever he touched the ball. In the second quarter, Brown was looking the other way when teammate Sasha Vujačić threw a pass his way. The ball bounced off his head and landed out of bounds, which was met with loud cheers from the crowd. Brown called the reception "weak" and stated that "they should be cheering that I'm gone." The Wizards won the game 94–91.

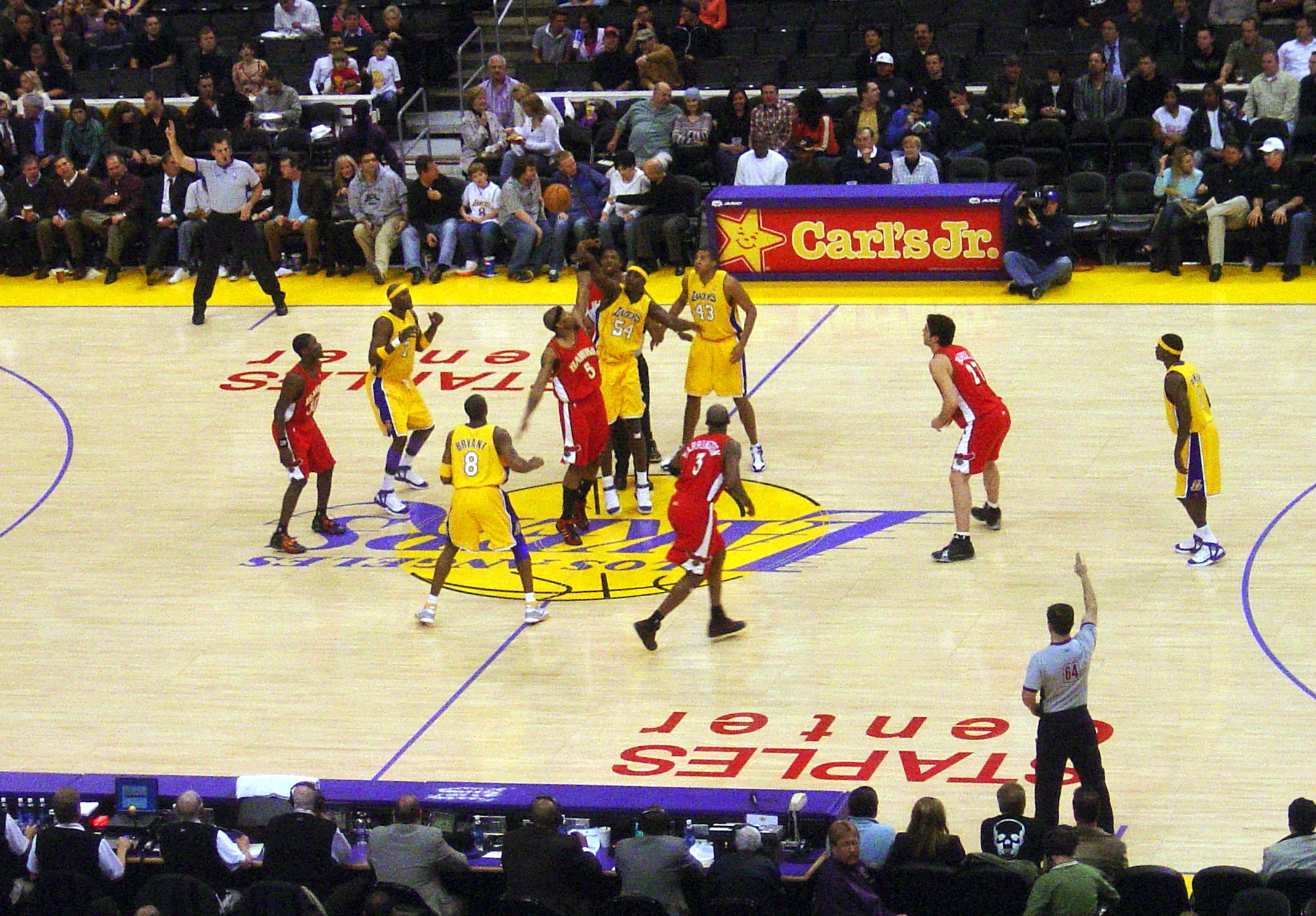
Brown winning a jump ball while playing against the Atlanta Hawks, February 2006

When Lakers center Chris Mihm went down with a season-ending ankle injury on March 12, 2006, Brown took over the starting center position. During his stint as a center, he raised his averages from 6.1 points and 6.3 rebounds to 12.3 points and 9.1 rebounds and started every game for the Lakers in the playoffs. Brown became a central part of the Lakers seven-game series with the Phoenix Suns. Although they ended up losing the series, it had appeared that Kwame Brown's potential was beginning to show.

The surprising consistency Brown showed while playing center prompted Phil Jackson to make Brown the starting center in the 2006–07 season. Brown was injured at the beginning of the season and Mihm was also out with injury for the whole season, so the starting job at center was given to the young Andrew Bynum. After playing the majority of the minutes at center despite the bench role, he was given the starting job in early December.

Brown again became injured in the 2007–08 season which allowed Bynum to start again at the center position where he flourished. However, when Bynum suffered a knee injury that appeared to jeopardize the Lakers' playoff chances, Brown regained his starting position.

=== Memphis Grizzlies (2008) ===
On February 1, 2008, Brown was traded along with Javaris Crittenton, Aaron McKie, the draft rights to Marc Gasol, and the Lakers' 2008 and 2010 first-round draft picks for Pau Gasol and a second-round pick in 2010. On July 1, 2008, the Memphis Grizzlies chose not to sign Brown to a new contract, making him an unrestricted free agent.

=== Detroit Pistons (2008–2010) ===
On July 28, 2008, ESPN.com reported that the Pistons signed Brown to a two-year deal worth $8 million, with the second year a player option.

=== Charlotte Bobcats (2010–2011) ===
On August 23, 2010, Brown signed a one-year deal with the Bobcats.

=== Golden State Warriors (2011–2012) ===
On December 14, 2011, Brown signed a one-year, $7 million contract with the Warriors.

=== Philadelphia 76ers (2012–2013) ===
On March 13, 2012, Brown, along with Monta Ellis and Ekpe Udoh, was traded to the Milwaukee Bucks in exchange for Andrew Bogut and Stephen Jackson. Brown never played for the Bucks during the season.

On July 20, 2012, Brown signed a two-year contract for nearly $6 million with the Philadelphia 76ers. After sustaining a right hamstring strain in September 2013, Brown was waived by the 76ers on November 20 before appearing in a game for them in the 2013–14 season.

== Post-NBA career ==
In 2017, Brown was the fifth overall pick in the inaugural draft of the BIG3 basketball league. In BIG3 Brown played for the 3 Headed Monsters, who made it to the finals and ended up losing to Trilogy 51–46.

In 2021, Brown created numerous YouTube videos critiquing the assertion that he was a 'bust" as a first round draft pick, claiming that mainstream U.S. sports media unfairly targeted him for over twenty years, as well as negatively depicting black men, in general. The videos were created in response to negative comments about Brown's career from former NBA players Matt Barnes and Stephen Jackson on a May 2021 episode of their podcast All the Smoke. Brown's response has led to a significant increase of social media attention, especially via YouTube and Instagram.

== Personal life ==
Brown's cousin Jabari Smith also played in the NBA. Smith's son, Jabari Smith Jr., also became an NBA player.

In 2002, Brown's hometown girlfriend, Joselyn Vaughn, moved into his Virginia home. Together they had three daughters. In 2019, Brown sued for custody of the children.

=== Legal issues ===
In August 2003, Brown was arrested and charged with driving while intoxicated near his hometown of Brunswick. In October 2007, Brown was arrested in Georgia and charged with disorderly conduct and interference with a law enforcement officer after an incident in which the driver of a car in which he was a passenger was arrested for driving drunk with a suspended license.

Brown was arrested on March 31, 2019, by Georgia police and charged with felony possession of edible marijuana products and misdemeanor possession of less than one ounce of marijuana.

== NBA career statistics ==
Legend
GP	Games played	GS	Games started	MPG	Minutes per game
FG%	Field goal percentage	3P%	3-point field goal percentage	FT%	Free throw percentage
RPG	Rebounds per game	APG	Assists per game	SPG	Steals per game
BPG	Blocks per game	PPG	Points per game	**Bold**	Career high

=== Regular season ===
Year	Team	GP	GS	MPG	FG%	3P%	FT%	RPG	APG	SPG	BPG	PPG
2001–02	Washington	57	3	14.3	.387	.000	**.707**	3.5	.8	.3	.5	4.5
2002–03	Washington	**80**	20	22.2	.446	.000	.668	5.3	.7	.6	1.0	7.4
2003–04	Washington	74	**57**	**30.3**	.489	**.500**	.683	**7.4**	1.5	.9	.7	**10.9**
2004–05	Washington	42	14	21.6	.460	.000	.574	4.9	.9	.6	.4	7.0
2005–06	L.A. Lakers	72	49	27.5	.526	.000	.545	6.6	1.0	.4	.6	7.4
2006–07	L.A. Lakers	41	28	27.6	**.591**	.000	.440	6.0	**1.8**	**1.0**	**1.2**	8.4
2007–08	L.A. Lakers	23	14	22.1	.515	.000	.406	5.7	1.2	.7	.8	5.7
2007–08	Memphis	15	1	13.6	.487	.000	.412	3.8	1.1	.4	.3	3.5
2008–09	Detroit	58	30	17.2	.533	.000	.516	5.0	.6	.4	.4	4.2
2009–10	Detroit	48	1	13.8	.500	.000	.337	3.7	.5	.3	.3	3.3
2010–11	Charlotte	66	50	26.0	.517	.000	.589	6.8	.7	.4	.6	7.9
2011–12	Golden State	9	3	20.8	.525	.000	.441	6.3	.4	.9	.0	6.3
2012–13	Philadelphia	22	11	12.2	.459	.000	.368	3.4	.4	.3	.5	1.9
Career		607	281	22.1	.492	.111	.570	5.5	.9	.5	.6	6.6

=== Playoffs ===
Year	Team	GP	GS	MPG	FG%	3P%	FT%	RPG	APG	SPG	BPG	PPG
2005	Washington	3	0	20.0	.385	.000	.556	5.0	**1.0**	.0	.7	5.0
2006	L.A. Lakers	**7**	**7**	**32.1**	.523	.000	.710	**6.6**	**1.0**	**.3**	.9	**12.9**
2007	L.A. Lakers	5	5	26.6	**.528**	.000	.556	5.6	.2	.2	.8	8.6
2009	Detroit	3	0	16.0	.375	.000	**.750**	5.0	.0	.0	**1.0**	3.0
Career		18	12	25.9	.500	.000	.660	5.8	.6	.2	.8	8.7
