= Stephen Jackson =

American basketball player (born 1978)

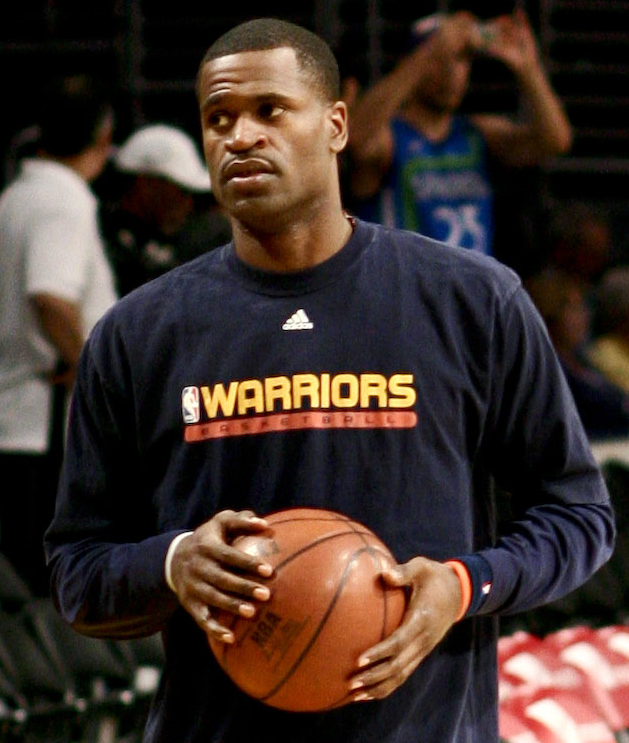
- Jackson with the Golden State Warriors in 2008

Personal information
- Born: April 5, 1978 (age 48) Houston, Texas, U.S.
- Listed height: 6 ft 8 in (2.03 m)
- Listed weight: 220 lb (100 kg)

Career information
- High school: Abraham Lincoln (Port Arthur, Texas); Oak Hill Academy (Mouth of Wilson, Virginia)
- NBA draft: 1997: 2nd round, 42nd overall pick
- Drafted by: Phoenix Suns
- Playing career: 1997–2014
- Position: Small forward / shooting guard
- Number: 24, 3, 1, 5

Career history
- 1997–1998: La Crosse Bobcats
- 1998: Sydney Kings
- 1999, 2000: Marinos de Oriente
- 1999, 2000: San Carlos
- 1999: Fort Wayne Fury
- 2000: Pueblo Nuevo
- 2000–2001: New Jersey Nets
- 2001–2003: San Antonio Spurs
- 2003–2004: Atlanta Hawks
- 2004–2007: Indiana Pacers
- 2007–2009: Golden State Warriors
- 2009–2011: Charlotte Bobcats
- 2011–2012: Milwaukee Bucks
- 2012–2013: San Antonio Spurs
- 2013–2014: Los Angeles Clippers

Career highlights
- NBA champion (2003); Second-team Parade All-American (1996); McDonald's All-American (1996)

Career statistics
- Points: 12,976 (15.1 ppg)
- Rebounds: 3,328 (3.9 rpg)
- Assists: 2,634 (3.1 apg)
- Stats at NBA.com
- Stats at Basketball Reference

Stephen Jesse Jackson (born April 5, 1978) is an American former professional basketball player who played 14 seasons in the National Basketball Association (NBA). Jackson played with numerous teams during his career, including the New Jersey Nets, Indiana Pacers, Golden State Warriors, Milwaukee Bucks, San Antonio Spurs, and Los Angeles Clippers. Jackson won an NBA championship with the Spurs in 2003. Jackson emerged as an activist and spokesman for civil rights during the Black Lives Matter movement. He is currently the Head Coach for the DMV Trilogy of the BIG3 Summer Basketball League.

== Early life and education ==
Jackson was born in Houston, Texas, and spent his childhood in Port Arthur, Texas. He was raised by his mother, Judyette, a single parent who worked two jobs. As a teenager, Jackson worked in his grandfather's soul food restaurant in Port Arthur, where he washed dishes and bus tables.

When Jackson was 16, his half-brother, Donald Buckner Jr., died at the age of 25 from head injuries after being struck in the head with a glass bottle. Following the violent tragedy, Jackson said that he wished he could have been there to assist and protect a member of his family. "You can't tell me seeing his brother die that way hasn't had an effect," recalls Pacers CEO Donnie Walsh. "To me, it's why he is always coming to the help of his teammates."

Jackson led Lincoln High School to a state championship in his junior year. However, facing academic "ineligibility" at Lincoln, he transferred to Oak Hill Academy (Virginia), where he earned All-American honors in 1996. He was the leading scorer in the 1996 McDonald's All-American Boys Game, on a team that included Kobe Bryant, Jermaine O'Neal and Tim Thomas.

Following a commitment to join the University of Arizona, Jackson was deemed academically ineligible due to his low SAT and ACT scores. He instead attended Butler County Community College of El Dorado, Kansas for one semester; he did not play basketball there. Prior to the 1997 NBA draft, Jackson participated in several pickup games with the Phoenix Suns after family friend Virginia Bibby (mother of NBA player Mike Bibby) brought him to the Suns arena during tryouts. Jackson's strong play, and particularly his fearlessness against the Suns' Cedric Ceballos, is largely what led to team president Danny Ainge to draft him months later.

== Professional career ==
=== CBA and foreign leagues (1997–2000) ===
Jackson was selected 42nd overall in the 1997 NBA draft by the Phoenix Suns, yet did not play as he was waived by the team on October 30. Following this development, Jackson then saw action in six games with the La Crosse Bobcats over two on-and-off seasons in the Continental Basketball Association (CBA), in which he averaged 2.7 points in 12.7 minutes per game. Additionally, Jackson played four games in 1998 with the Sydney Kings in Australia's National Basketball League. Continuing his basketball journey, Jackson played professionally in Venezuela and the Dominican Republic. Throughout the spring and summer of 2000, Jackson played in those Latin American countries, with the Dominican Republic teams San Carlos and Pueblo Nuevo and the Venezuelan team the Marinos. In the 1999 season in Venezuela, Jackson played 48 games and averaged 22.8 points (third in the league), 3.9 assists and 3 steals per game, shooting 42.6% from three (second in the league).

=== New Jersey Nets (2000–2001) ===
Jackson did not play in a NBA game until the 2000–01 season with the New Jersey Nets, officially deemed his rookie season. He appeared in 77 games (including 40 starts), in which he averaged 8.2 points per game, and established a close friendship with star point guard Stephon Marbury. The Nets did not have interest in retaining him.

=== San Antonio Spurs (2001–2003) ===
Before the 2001–2002 NBA season, Jackson was signed by the San Antonio Spurs. He was hampered by injuries, missing 45 games. Former assistant coach Mike Brown stated: "The first year we had him in San Antonio, he was on the (injured reserve) most of the year. At first, he didn't understand why because he probably was the most talented player we had on that team, but he needed to mature a little bit so we stuck him there to see how he would respond. He was the best teammate on our team that first year. He was juiced at practice ready to play and compete and make the starters better, and it carried over into his second year when he got his opportunity to get out onto the floor and prove he could be a vital part of the organization." His season averages were 3.9 points and 1.1 rebounds, logging approximately 9.9 minutes per game.

During the 2002–2003 NBA season, Jackson became a key member of the Spurs. Appearing in 80 games (58 starts), his season averages were 11.8 points, 3.6 rebounds and 2.3 assists in 28.2 minutes per game. During the team's run in the 2003 NBA Playoffs, Jackson proved to be a vital asset and helped the Spurs win their second NBA title, averaging 12.8 points per game during the playoffs –- the team's 3rd leading scorer. Jackson's first foray into the playoffs produced variable results in terms of individual performances. Through the course of the postseason, Jackson vacillated between fourth quarter heroics and clutch shooting (elimination games of the Western Conference Finals versus the Dallas Mavericks and NBA Finals versus the New Jersey Nets) and uneven, mistake-prone play (26 turnovers in the 6-game championship series).

=== Atlanta Hawks (2003–2004) ===
In 2003, Jackson became a free agent during the offseason and expected to parlay his success with the Spurs into a long-term contract. After rejecting an initial offer by the Spurs, he and his agent were criticized by sports media for miscalculating the market. Eventually, Jackson agreed to a 2-year contract with the Atlanta Hawks. Registering his best professional season to date, Jackson established season averages of 18.1 points, 4.6 rebounds and 3.1 assists per game in 80 total games (78 starts). On March 12, against the Washington Wizards, Jackson scored a career-best 42 points. In the 29 games following the All-Star Break, Jackson averaged 24.0 points, 5.5 rebounds, 3.5 assists, and 2.2 steals per game. During this stretch, he was the NBA's 6th leading scorer.

Following the 2003–04 NBA season, he was traded to the Indiana Pacers for power forward Al Harrington (who finished 2nd place in Sixth Man of the Year voting), after signing a 6-year, $38.3 million contract.

=== Indiana Pacers (2004–2007) ===
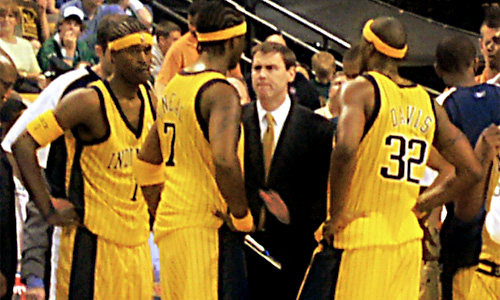
Jackson (left) with Pacers teammates Jermaine O'Neal and Dale Davis and coach Rick Carlisle

During his first season as a member of the Indiana Pacers in the 2004–05 NBA season, Jackson tallied averages of 18.7 points, 4.9 rebounds, and 2.3 assists per game.

On November 19, 2004, during The Malice at the Palace, Jackson was involved in a brawl with fans in the stands at The Palace of Auburn Hills. In the aftermath, Jackson was suspended for 30 games without pay, thereby losing $1.7 million in salary. He was also put on probation for a year, fined $250, and ordered to undergo anger management classes and perform 60 hours of community service. After he failed to complete the terms of the sentence he received, his probation was extended one year.

Indiana's once promising post-season possibilities were marred by the suspension of starting small forward Ron Artest. Jackson averaged 18.9 points per game during the first round of the 2005 NBA Playoffs versus the Boston Celtics. A series loss in the next round at the hands of the Detroit Pistons ended their season, with Jackson leading the team in scoring during the playoffs with an average of 16.1 points per game.

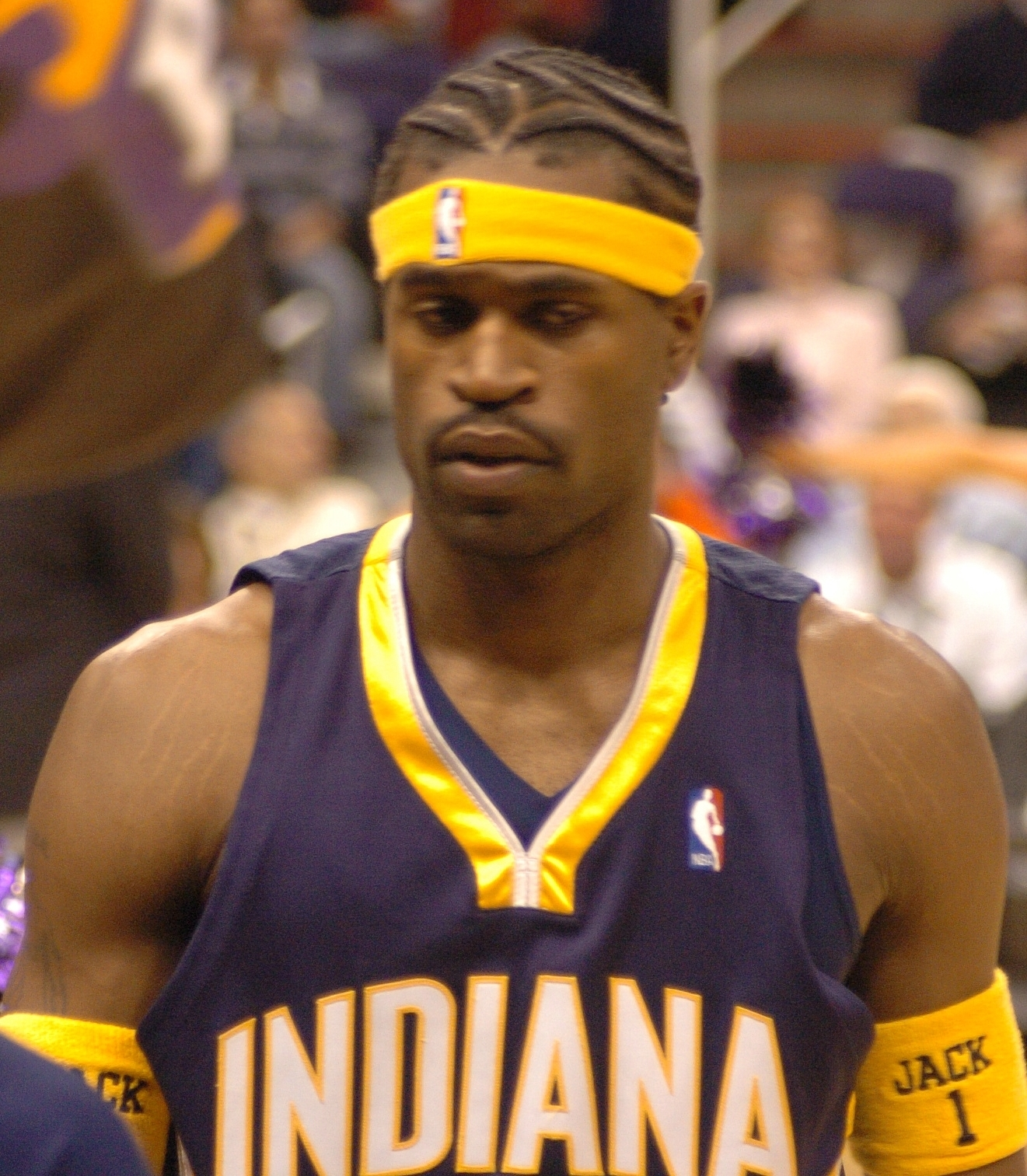
Jackson with the Pacers in 2005

In the 2005–06 NBA season, Jackson appeared in 81 games for the Pacers, averaging 16.4 points, 3.9 rebounds, and 2.8 assists per game. A notable exhibition of Jackson's scoring ability came during a 31-point performance in a midseason victory over the Sacramento Kings, in which he made 3-pointers on four consecutive possessions. Jackson tied the Kings franchise record for the most 3-pointers in a quarter by an opponent. As the playoff push ensued, he tallied an average of 20.2 points per game in the month of April.

On October 6, 2006, Jackson and three other Pacers players had an argument with several patrons at Club Rio, a strip club in Indianapolis. Jackson was punched by one of the patrons and was hit by a car, rolling onto the hood. His injuries were minor. Jackson, who was on probation in Michigan after pleading no contest to misdemeanor assault and battery charges there for his part in the “Malice at the Palace”, fired several gunshots from a 9-mm pistol, he asserted as an act of self-defense. However, prosecutors later said he fired first. Jackson was charged October 11, 2006, with a felony count of criminal recklessness, and misdemeanor counts of battery and disorderly conduct. He pled guilty to a felony count of criminal recklessness, received one year of probation, and was ordered to pay a $5,000 fine and perform 100 hours of community service. Because he had no prior felony convictions, he was eligible to receive misdemeanor sentencing despite pleading guilty to the felony. He served a seven-game suspension at the beginning of the 2007–08 NBA season as a Warrior for his legal problems.

=== Golden State Warriors (2007–2009) ===
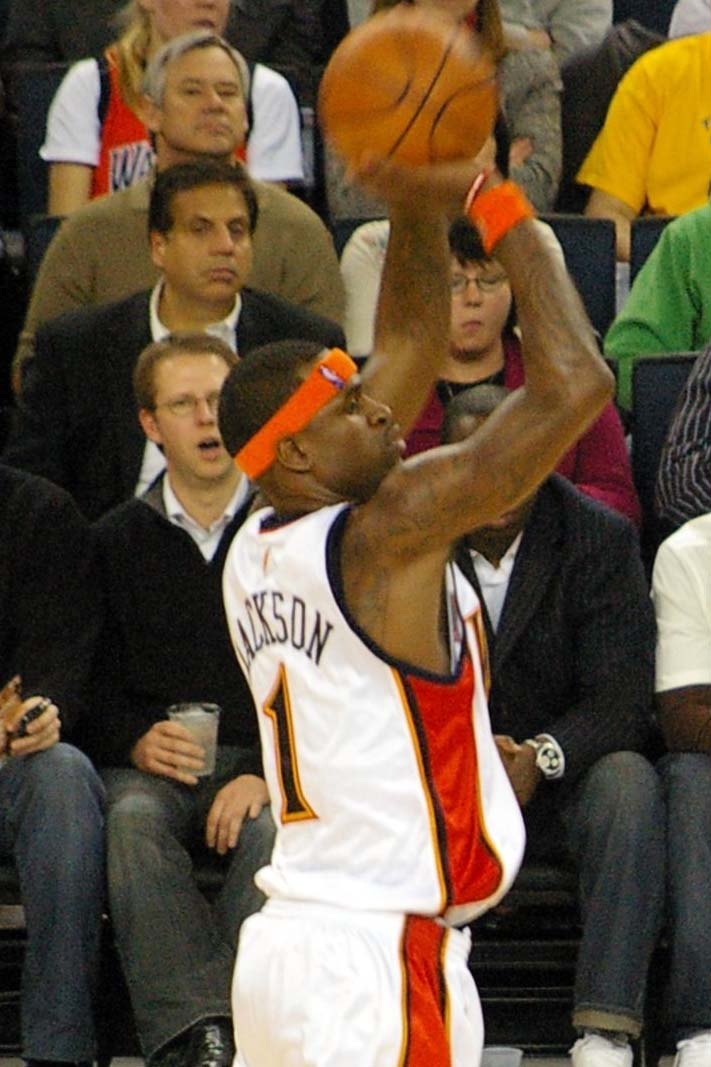
Jackson takes a jump shot during a regular season Warriors game

On January 17, 2007, the Pacers dealt Jackson to the Golden State Warriors in a blockbuster eight player trade. Along with Al Harrington, Šarūnas Jasikevičius, and Josh Powell, Jackson was swapped for Mike Dunleavy, Troy Murphy, Ike Diogu, and Keith McLeod of the Warriors.

Jackson registered 29 points, 7 rebounds, 4 assists, and 5 steals in his Warriors debut, January 20, 2007, versus the Cleveland Cavaliers. On February 5, when Golden State traveled to Conseco Fieldhouse to compete against Jackson's former team, he tallied 36 points and led the Warriors to a 113–98 victory over the Indiana Pacers. Jackson joined Vince Carter and Dominique Wilkins as the only players in 25 years to amass 30 or more points against a team that they played for earlier in the season.

In the Warriors 4–2 series victory over the Dallas Mavericks in the first round of the 2007 NBA Playoffs, Jackson garnered both positive and negative publicity. In what some consider the biggest upset in NBA history, Jackson was ejected from Games 2 and 5. The latter decision, in Game 5, was heavily criticized as Jackson appeared to be merely applauding at the end of the game to lift the spirits of his teammates, and not sarcastically at a referee. However, Jackson redeemed himself by playing well the entire series, especially in the series-clinching Game 6, where Jackson tallied 33 points on a then franchise playoff-record 7 three-pointers. This team playoff record has since been matched or exceeded 25 times by Stephen Curry and Klay Thompson.

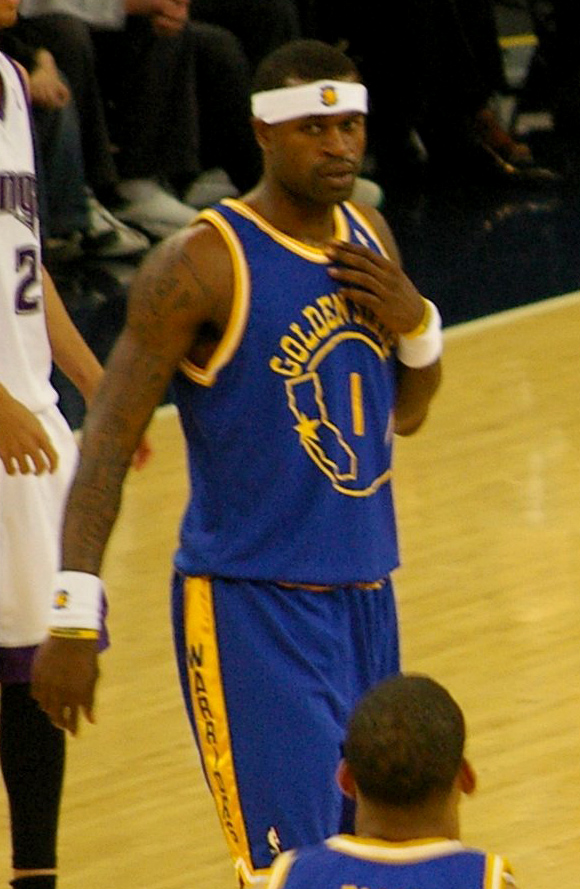
Jackson in the Warriors "throwback" uniform in 2008.

Baron Davis, who suffered a slight hamstring injury in the 1st quarter of Game 6, shares his thoughts regarding Jackson: "I told him (Stephen Jackson) I'll give it all I got and I didn't want to be the hardest worker out there. He had to carry me. He is the leader of this team and if you ask anyone on this team, he is the heart and soul of this team. He is a big-game performer and he knew just how important this game was. He is the only one on our team to have won a championship, so we had to feed off of him."

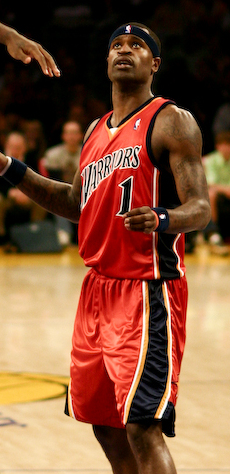
Jackson with the Warriors in 2008.

Jackson finished the series with per-game averages of 22.8 points, 4.5 rebounds, 3.7 assists, and 2.0 steals. In the Conference Semifinals, the Warriors were dispatched by a physical Utah Jazz team in 5 games. Jackson struggled due to the defensive tandem of Andrei Kirilenko and Matt Harpring and his offensive output decreased from the previous series.

Prior to the 2007–08 NBA season, Jackson (along with guard Baron Davis and forward Matt Barnes) was named a team captain of the Warriors. Jackson was the recipient of the NBA's Western Conference Player of the Week award (November 26 – December 2), averaging 23.0 points, 5.5 rebounds, 3.8 assists, and 2.8 steals. Despite winning 48 games, the Warriors missed the playoffs in a Western Conference where all eight playoff teams won at least 50 games (Their 48 wins are the most of a team that did not qualify for playoffs in NBA history).

During the 2008–09 NBA season, Jackson registered three games of at least 30 points and 10 assists in a five-game span – the first NBA player to do so since LeBron James in 2007, and the first member of the Warriors since Tim Hardaway in 1992. He also tallied his first career triple double (30 points, 11 rebounds, 10 assists) against the Phoenix Suns in the midst of this stretch, on February 4. On November 17, 2008, Jackson signed a three-year contract extension with the Warriors.

Jackson's 2008–09 campaign effectively ended when he decided to determine the root cause of turf toe on his left foot, which had been ailing him for over 2 years. He underwent surgery on March 31, 2009, to remove multiple bone spurs above the nerve tissue under his big toe. His per-game season averages were 20.7 points, 5.1 rebounds, 6.5 assists (2nd only to LeBron James for forwards), 1.5 steals, and 39.6 minutes (2nd in the league, trailing only Joe Johnson of the Atlanta Hawks).

=== Charlotte Bobcats (2009–2011) ===
On November 16, 2009, Jackson was traded to the Charlotte Bobcats along with Acie Law in exchange for Raja Bell and Vladimir Radmanović. Jackson set a Bobcats franchise record with 43 points scored versus the Houston Rockets, on January 12, 2010. The NBA recognized Jackson as the Eastern Conference's Player of the Week on January 17, after he averaged 29.3 points, 6.7 rebounds, 4.7 assists and 3.3 steals. In tandem with forward Gerald Wallace, Jackson led the Bobcats to the franchise's first playoff appearance (culminating in a 4–0 series loss at the hands of the Orlando Magic). In league MVP voting, Jackson finished in 12th place, tied with Chris Bosh, Joe Johnson, and Chauncey Billups.

In the 2010-11 NBA season, Jackson recorded the first triple double (24 points, 10 rebounds, and 10 assists) in Bobcats team history versus the Phoenix Suns on November 20, 2010. However, Jackson failed to lead the Bobcats to the playoffs in 2011 and expressed disappointment with the team following a midseason trade of Gerald Wallace.

=== Milwaukee Bucks (2011–2012) ===
On June 23, 2011, after only two seasons with the Charlotte Bobcats, Jackson was traded to the Milwaukee Bucks as part of a three-way deal with the Sacramento Kings and Charlotte Bobcats. As part of the terms, the Milwaukee Bucks received Jackson, Shaun Livingston, the rights to the 19th overall pick in the 2011 NBA draft, Tobias Harris from Charlotte, and Beno Udrih from Sacramento. Charlotte received Corey Maggette from Milwaukee and the rights to the 7th overall pick in the 2011 NBA Draft, Bismack Biyombo, from Sacramento. Sacramento received John Salmons from Milwaukee and the rights to Jimmer Fredette, the 10th overall pick in the 2011 NBA Draft.

Jackson's brief stint with Milwaukee would be characterized by dysfunction and underwhelming play. Due to recurring issues with his hamstring throughout the lockout-extended offseason and several publicized clashes with coach Scott Skiles, Jackson's role and playing time diminished. On March 13, 2012, Jackson was traded back to the Golden State Warriors along with Andrew Bogut, in exchange for Monta Ellis, Ekpe Udoh, and Kwame Brown.

=== Return to San Antonio (2012–2013) ===
Without playing a game for the Warriors, Jackson was traded to the Spurs for Richard Jefferson, T. J. Ford and a conditional first-round pick on March 15, 2012. Due to the ascendant performance of rookie forward Kawhi Leonard, Jackson was a second-unit player for the first time in nearly 10 years. A re-adjustment period to San Antonio's structured offensive system caused Jackson's minutes to fluctuate in the regular season and playoffs.

The Spurs capped off an excellent regular season by reaching the Western Conference Playoffs as the highest seed. Ultimately, San Antonio lost 4 games to 2 to the Oklahoma City Thunder in the Western Conference Finals. Jackson drew praise for his defensive efforts against league scoring champion Kevin Durant. In the elimination game of the series, Jackson connected on his first 6 three-point attempts. For the playoffs, Jackson shot 53.5% from the field, 60.5% from three-point range, and 93.3% from the free throw line.

On December 9, 2012, Jackson was fined $25,000 for threatening Serge Ibaka via Twitter. "The recent public comments made by Stephen Jackson are absolutely unacceptable, cannot be tolerated, and do not reflect the standards held by the San Antonio Spurs," said Spurs general manager R.C. Buford.

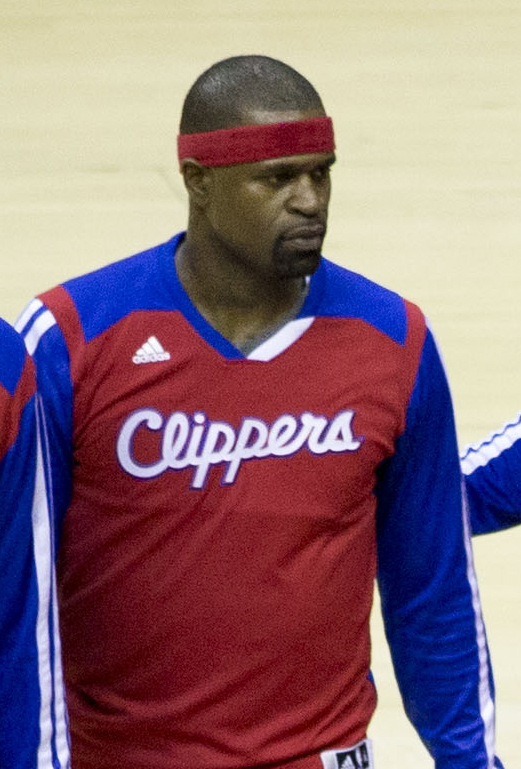
Jackson with the Clippers in 2013

On April 12, 2013, Jackson was waived by the Spurs.

=== Los Angeles Clippers (2013–2014) ===
On December 10, 2013, he signed with the Los Angeles Clippers. Jackson struggled with the Clippers. In 9 games, he averaged a career-low 1.7 points per game, while shooting 23.1% from the field and 7.1% from three-point range. On January 7, 2014, he was waived by the Clippers.

=== Retirement ===
On July 22, 2015, Jackson announced his retirement. During his 14-year NBA career, Jackson earned more than $68.6 million in salary (excluding his stint with the Clippers in which his contract was not guaranteed).

== BIG3 ==
In 2017, Jackson joined the BIG3 basketball league, playing alongside Chauncey Billups and head coach Charles Oakley with the Killer 3s.

In 2021, he was named head coach of Trilogy, and led the team to back-to-back BIG3 Championships (2021–22).

Teams

As player:

2017–2019 Killer 3's

As coach:

2021–present Trilogy

Accomplishments

- 2x BIG3 Champion (2021, 2022)
- Trash Talker Of The Year (2021)
- Coach Of The Year (2021)

== Podcasting career ==
Jackson hosts the digital video podcast All the Smoke with Matt Barnes and Stephen Jackson. The podcast had the last exclusive interview with Kobe Bryant before his death in January 2020. It is produced by Malka Media and Showtime Networks.

== NBA career statistics ==
Legend
GP	Games played	GS	Games started	MPG	Minutes per game
FG%	Field goal percentage	3P%	3-point field goal percentage	FT%	Free throw percentage
RPG	Rebounds per game	APG	Assists per game	SPG	Steals per game
BPG	Blocks per game	PPG	Points per game	**Bold**	Career high
†	Won an NBA championship	*	Led the league

=== Regular season ===
Year	Team	GP	GS	MPG	FG%	3P%	FT%	RPG	APG	SPG	BPG	PPG
2000–01	New Jersey	77	40	21.6	.425	.335	.719	2.7	1.8	1.1	.2	8.2
2001–02	San Antonio	23	1	9.9	.374	.250	.706	1.1	.5	.7	.1	3.9
2002–03†	San Antonio	80	58	28.2	.435	.320	.760	3.6	2.3	1.6	.4	11.8
2003–04	Atlanta	80	78	36.8	.425	.340	.785	4.6	3.1	**1.8**	.3	18.1
2004–05	Indiana	51	49	35.4	.403	.360	.830	4.9	2.3	1.3	.3	18.7
2005–06	Indiana	**81**	**81**	35.9	.411	.345	.786	3.9	2.8	1.3	.5	16.4
2006–07	Indiana	37	32	32.1	.419	.297	.822	2.6	3.1	.9	.5	14.1
2006–07	Golden State	38	37	34.0	**.446**	.341	.804	3.3	4.6	1.3	.4	16.8
2007–08	Golden State	73	73	39.1	.405	**.363**	**.832**	4.4	4.1	1.3	.4	20.1
2008–09	Golden State	59	59	**39.6**	.414	.338	.826	**5.1**	**6.5**	1.5	.5	20.7
2009–10	Golden State	9	9	33.3	.421	.275	.703	3.9	4.7	1.6	**.7**	16.6
2009–10	Charlotte	72	72	39.3	.423	.334	.786	5.1	3.6	1.6	.5	**21.1**
2010–11	Charlotte	67	67	35.9	.411	.337	.816	4.5	3.6	1.2	.4	18.5
2011–12	Milwaukee	26	13	27.4	.357	.278	.833	3.2	3.0	1.0	.2	10.5
2011–12	San Antonio	21	1	23.8	.405	.306	.815	3.9	2.0	1.3	.3	8.9
2012–13	San Antonio	55	6	19.5	.373	.271	.700	2.8	1.5	.7	.3	6.2
2013–14	L.A. Clippers	9	0	11.9	.231	.071	.500	1.1	0.6	.7	.1	1.7
Career		858	676	31.9	.414	.333	.798	3.9	3.1	1.3	.4	15.1

=== Playoffs ===
Year	Team	GP	GS	MPG	FG%	3P%	FT%	RPG	APG	SPG	BPG	PPG
2003†	San Antonio	**24**	**24**	33.8	.414	.336	.803	4.1	2.7	1.4	.4	12.8
2005	Indiana	13	13	36.3	.393	.317	.817	3.8	2.2	1.9	.5	16.1
2006	Indiana	6	6	37.8	.366	.231	.778	4.5	3.3	.7	.2	13.3
2007	Golden State	11	11	**41.3**	.379	.361	.816	3.6	3.6	**2.0**	**.7**	**19.9**
2010	Charlotte	4	4	39.0	.358	.167	.808	**5.0**	**3.8**	1.3	.3	18.0
2012	San Antonio	14	0	21.4	**.535**	**.605***	**.933**	2.0	1.7	.6	.2	8.3
Career		72	58	33.6	.404	.355	.816	3.7	2.7	1.4	.4	13.9

== Player profile ==
Jackson was an NBA swingman who was known to be a somewhat streaky outside shooter, but with scoring range that extended from the basket to the 3-point line. Despite spurts of inefficient, turnover-prone play, Jackson proved a capable playmaking option, with above-average passing abilities and court vision.

Larry Brown, a member of the Basketball Hall of Fame and former head coach of the Charlotte Bobcats, readily acknowledged Jackson's ability: "You ask anyone in the league – Stephen is an elite player. He's as bright as anyone I've coached." Former Golden State Warriors head coach Don Nelson, the second most winning coach in NBA history, summarized Jackson's game: "I don't think that people realize how good a player Jackson is, he guards every night, he makes plays, he can shoot, and the only thing that he doesn't do is rebound. He makes everyone around him better." Jackson's coach during his Indiana days, Rick Carlisle, described Jackson as a "terrific all-around player... He's an experienced guy, strong and quick. He has a good understanding of the game on the defensive side of the ball." NBA legend and former Pacers president Larry Bird called Jackson the toughest player in the league, regarding injuries and subsequently playing through the pain. Bird also praised Jackson's ability to "do every aspect of the game at a high level." Theo Ratliff, a former Bobcats teammate, asserted that "if he is not an All-Star in this league, I don't know who is. It is time people recognize what he does on the floor."

Tim Duncan once labeled Jackson as the "ultimate teammate" during Jackson's first stint in San Antonio. ESPN analyst and sportswriter Michael Smith finds Jackson to be "articulate, charming, and thoughtful."

Marcus Thompson of the Contra Costa Times conveys his opinion as such: "He takes the younger players under his wing, taking them shopping, dispensing advice, lending an ear. What's more, he does the little things that are unbecoming of a millionaire. He looks people in the eye when they talk to him, as if he cares about what they're saying. He frequently doles out handshakes, half-hugs and, to women, pecks on the cheek. He returns phone calls. He mends fences, lifts spirits, makes others feel special." Following a community outreach event, Gwen Knapp of the San Francisco Chronicle stated that "[Jackson] couldn't have been more charming or more engaged, the perfect face of the franchise."

[Jackson's] a one and only, as it should be.

— Hall of Fame inductee and former NBA coach Don Nelson

Former coaches Rick Carlisle and Don Nelson have constantly referred to Jackson's high character. During an appearance on the Jim Rome radio show, Nelson alluded to Jackson in a laudatory manner beyond the limited scope of the NBA. Former Pacers executive Donnie Walsh, who was principally responsible for the Golden State trade, stated "I love Jack to death. He's emotional and he's going to get technicals. But that's just part of the package. He's a great team guy."

== Personal life ==
Stemming from the two referenced incidents in 2004 and 2006, Jackson has pled guilty to felony criminal recklessness, and been charged with a number of misdemeanors, including assault, disorderly conduct, and two counts of battery.

On January 4, 2018, Jackson told TMZ, "I smoked my whole career, had a hell of a career. Didn't miss no games," when asked by a reporter if the NBA should remove marijuana from their banned substances list.

On July 7, 2020, Jackson defended Philadelphia Eagles wide receiver DeSean Jackson for posting an antisemitic post on Instagram, which included a quote falsely attributed to Adolf Hitler. After receiving criticism from Naismith Hall of Fame members such as Kareem Abdul-Jabbar and Charles Barkley, Jackson apologized for his comments, saying that he "used the wrong words".

On January 6, 2021, Jackson officially converted to Islam. Jackson stated in an interview, "I can honestly say that there is no one who loves Allah more than me." He also stated, "Everything I have today is because I get on my knees and pray five times a day. I wouldn't be able to wake up, breathe, and provide for my child, if I didn't get on my knees and worship Allah. Allah is the one in control, and each and every one of us in creation are reliant on Allah in each and every moment. It is only when we realize this that this inner peace descends upon us. And that's what Islam is about–Salaam–that peace."

In December 2011, under the alias Stak5, Jackson released a rap mixtape entitled What's a Lockout?, hosted by DJ Scream of Maybach Music Group. The mixtape included guest appearances by various artists, including rapper Scarface.

Imani Showalter, Jackson's ex-fiancée and mother of two of his children, was a cast member of the first season of Basketball Wives: LA, a reality show airing on American cable television network VH1.

=== Activism and charity ===
During his seven-game suspension to begin the 2007–08 NBA season, Jackson donated significant time toward community service in the Oakland area, organizing several events geared toward children. Additionally, during a game against the Toronto Raptors, Jackson paid tribute to forward Matt Barnes and his cancer-stricken mother by inscribing Barnes' 22 on his headband. Jackson also offered to delay his return from suspension if Barnes needed the support at home. Throughout his tenure in Golden State, Jackson attended Bible study with teammates such as Kelenna Azubuike, Al Harrington, and Brandan Wright. Pairing up with Southwest Airlines, Jackson and the Warriors organization arranged an essay contest for elementary school students from his hometown of Port Arthur, which gave 10 third-graders the opportunity to meet Jackson and receive tickets to the following night's game.

The NBA recognized Jackson for his commitment to charity and presented him with the league's Community Assist Award for March 2008. During the month, he participated in a Silence the Violence rally, teamed up with Grammy Award-winner John Legend to raise funds for the Show Me Campaign, participated in a groundbreaking for a basketball court, and launched his own foundation. In conjunction with the Good Tidings Foundation, Jackson unveiled the Stephen Jackson Basketball Court at Omega Boys Club in San Francisco, California on April 11, 2008. Additionally, in honor of Jackson's continued commitment to the Bay Area community, San Francisco Mayor Gavin Newsom proclaimed Saturday, April 12, 2008 – the day after the unveiling – as Stephen Jackson Day.

Jackson established the Stephen Jackson Academy of Art, Science, and Technology in the summer of 2008 in Port Arthur. New construction for the school was completed in 2009; as of 2012, the academy offered after-school programs for local children and houses a gymnasium for public use. In order to pursue educational accreditation, Jackson planned to expand the academy. Jackson hoped construction commence by the end of 2012. but in 2018 Jackson stated he would be selling the academy after expressing his frustration that the city had not matched his investment in the gym. Additionally, they offered no support for his goal of establishing an elementary school.

Jackson was a close friend of George Floyd, who drew international attention when he was killed by police in Minneapolis on May 25, 2020. Jackson received media attention for an impassioned speech he gave at a protest rally in Minnesota. In it, he stated, "I'm here because they're not gonna demean the character of George Floyd, my twin." Jackson and Floyd called each other "Twin" due to their similar physical resemblance.

Jackson described himself as inspired by Malcolm X, who is described as "the biggest reason for the continuation of Islam in the African-American community." Jackson stated, "Every black man is influenced by Malcolm X. When you are growing up and hear the story of Malcolm X, you are influenced by Malcolm X, and by Islam, in some type of way. For me, I am of course influenced by Malcolm X. It is impossible for me not to be...I do not see myself just following him. I want to be greater than Malcolm X. Even when I say that, it might be damn near impossible, because the man was so special. Malcolm X was so special. I strive to be like him or even better than him. And for you to say that he is the most respected American Muslim ever, I strive to be that. I plan to be that."

== See also ==
- List of people banned or suspended by the NBA
