= 2008–09 Washington Wizards season =

NBA professional basketball team season

- Head coach: Eddie Jordan (Games 1-11); Ed Tapscott (interim) (Games 12-82)
- Arena: Verizon Center

Results
- Record: 19–63 (.232)
- Place: Division: 5th (Southeast); Conference: 15th (Eastern)
- Playoff finish: Did not qualify
- Stats at Basketball Reference

Local media
- Television: CSN Mid-Atlantic, The CW Washington, News Channel 8
- Radio: ESPN 980

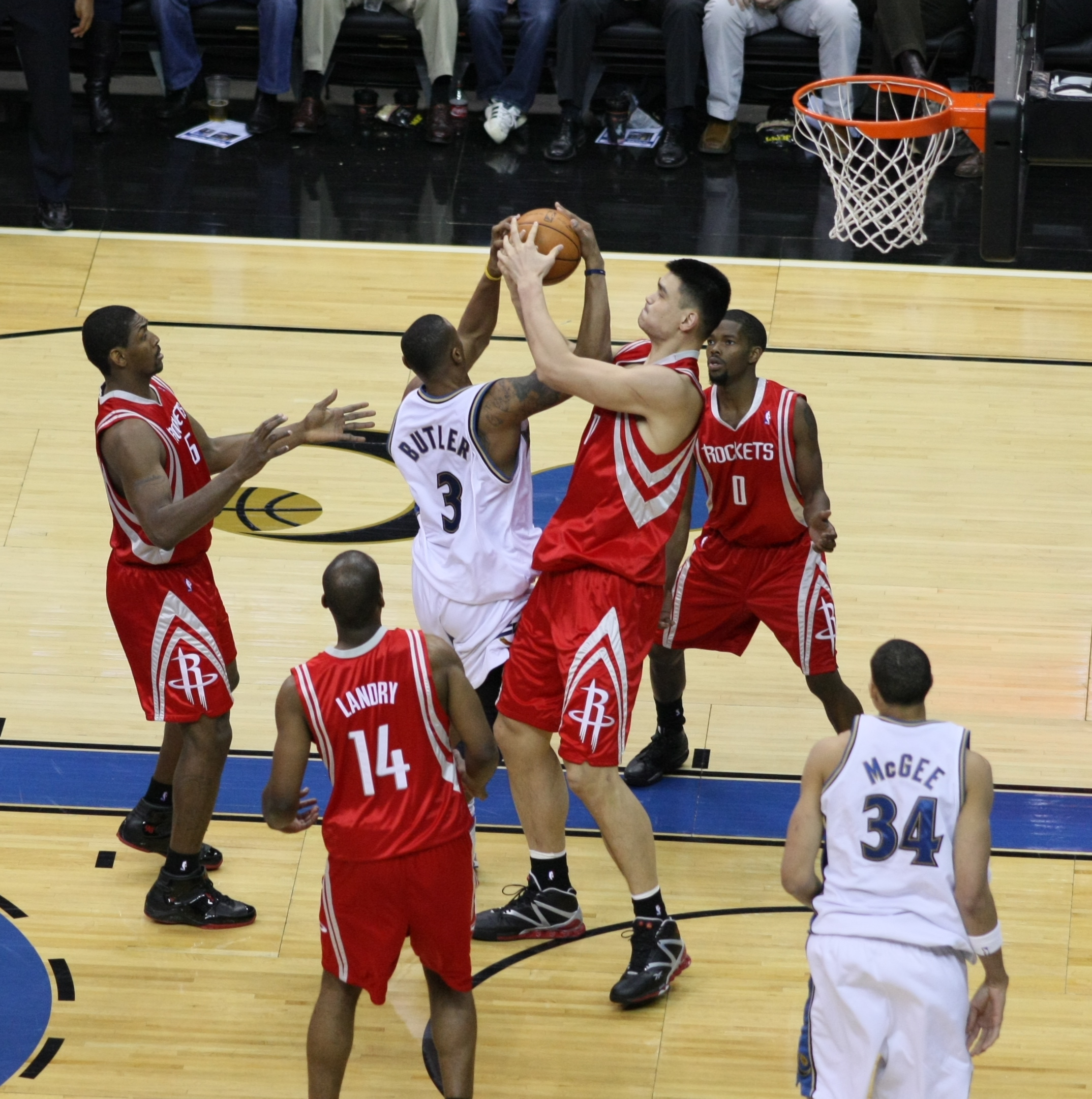
Yao Ming battles Caron Butler for a rebound during the Washington Wizards v/s Houston Rockets game on Nov 21, 2008 at Verizon Center in Washington, D.C.

The 2008–09 Washington Wizards season was the 48th season of the franchise in the National Basketball Association (NBA). The Wizards began the season hoping to improve on their 43–39 record from the previous season, but failed and fell 24 games short. The team finished 2008–09 with a dismal 19–63 record that equalled their worst 82-game performance from the 2000–01 season, and failed to qualify for the playoffs for the first time since the 2003–04 season.

== Key dates ==
- June 26: The 2008 NBA draft took place in New York City, New York.
- July 1: The free agency period started.

== Transactions ==
- June 30 - Re-signed forward Antawn Jamison to a 4-year, $50 million contract
- July 11 - Guard Roger Mason signed with the San Antonio Spurs
- July 13 - Re-signed guard Gilbert Arenas to a 6-year, $111 million contract
- September 23 - Signed guard Juan Dixon to a contract.
- December 10 - Traded guard Antonio Daniels to the New Orleans Hornets and a conditional first-round draft pick to the Memphis Grizzlies in a three-team deal in exchange for guards Mike James and Javaris Crittenton. Also waived guard Dee Brown

== Draft picks ==
Round	Pick	Player	Position	Nationality	College
1	18	JaVale McGee	C	United States	Nevada
2	47	Bill Walker (traded to Boston)	SF	United States	Kansas State

== Roster ==
Washington Wizards roster
Players

Pos.	No.	Player	Height	Weight	DOB	From
PG	0	Gilbert Arenas	6 ft 3 in (1.91 m)	191 lb (87 kg)		Arizona
F/C	32	Andray Blatche	6 ft 11 in (2.11 m)	235 lb (107 kg)		South Kent Prep (HS)
SG	3	Caron Butler	6 ft 7 in (2.01 m)	217 lb (98 kg)		Connecticut
G	8	Javaris Crittenton	6 ft 5 in (1.96 m)	200 lb (91 kg)		Georgia Tech
G	12	Juan Dixon	6 ft 3 in (1.91 m)	164 lb (74 kg)		Maryland
C	33	Brendan Haywood	7 ft 0 in (2.13 m)	268 lb (122 kg)		North Carolina
PG	13	Mike James	6 ft 2 in (1.88 m)	188 lb (85 kg)		Duquesne
PF	4	Antawn Jamison	6 ft 8 in (2.03 m)	223 lb (101 kg)		North Carolina
C	34	JaVale McGee	7 ft 0 in (2.13 m)	237 lb (108 kg)		Nevada
SF	5	Dominic McGuire	6 ft 9 in (2.06 m)	220 lb (100 kg)		Fresno State
C	14	Oleksiy Pecherov	7 ft 0 in (2.13 m)	234 lb (106 kg)		Ukraine
C	9	Darius Songaila	6 ft 9 in (2.06 m)	248 lb (112 kg)		Wake Forest
SG	2	DeShawn Stevenson	6 ft 5 in (1.96 m)	210 lb (95 kg)		Washington Union High School
C	36	Etan Thomas	6 ft 9 in (2.06 m)	256 lb (116 kg)		Syracuse
SG	1	Nick Young	6 ft 6 in (1.98 m)	200 lb (91 kg)		USC

Coaches
Head coach
- Eddie Jordan (fired)
- Ed Tapscott (interim)

Legend
- (DP) Unsigned draft pick
- (FA) Free agent
- (S) Suspended
- Injured

== Regular season ==
=== Standings ===
Southeast Division	W	L	PCT	GB	Home	Road	Div	GP
y-Orlando Magic	59	23	.720	—	32–9	27–14	14–2	82
x-Atlanta Hawks	47	35	.573	12	31–10	16–25	11–5	82
x-Miami Heat	43	39	.524	16	28–13	15–26	9–7	82
Charlotte Bobcats	35	47	.427	24	23–18	12–29	5–11	82
Washington Wizards	19	63	.232	40	13–28	6–35	1–15	82

#	Eastern Conference				
#	Team	W	L	PCT	GB
1	z-Cleveland Cavaliers	66	16	.805	—
2	y-Boston Celtics	62	20	.756	4
3	y-Orlando Magic	59	23	.720	7
4	x-Atlanta Hawks	47	35	.573	19
5	x-Miami Heat	43	39	.524	23
6	x-Philadelphia 76ers	41	41	.500	25
7	x-Chicago Bulls	41	41	.500	25
8	x-Detroit Pistons	39	43	.476	27
9	Indiana Pacers	36	46	.439	30
10	Charlotte Bobcats	35	47	.427	31
11	New Jersey Nets	34	48	.415	32
12	Milwaukee Bucks	34	48	.415	32
13	Toronto Raptors	33	49	.402	33
14	New York Knicks	32	50	.390	34
15	Washington Wizards	19	63	.232	47

=== Game log ===
2008–09 game log
Total: 19–63 (Home: 13–28; Road: 6–35)
October: 0–1 (home: 0–1; road: 0–0)

Game	Date	Team	Score	High points	High rebounds	High assists	Location Attendance	Record
1	October 29	New Jersey	L 85–95	Antawn Jamison, DeShawn Stevenson (14)	Caron Butler (11)	Caron Butler (5)	Verizon Center; 20,173	0–1

November: 2–11 (home: 2–5; road: 0–6)

Game	Date	Team	Score	High points	High rebounds	High assists	Location Attendance	Record
2	November 1	@ Detroit	L 109–117	Antawn Jamison (24)	Antawn Jamison (8)	Caron Butler (6)	The Palace of Auburn Hills; 22,076	0–2
3	November 5	@ Milwaukee	L 104–112 (OT)	Caron Butler (27)	Antawn Jamison (10)	Juan Dixon, Antonio Daniels (4)	Bradley Center; 13,895	0–3
4	November 7	New York	L 108–114	Caron Butler (30)	Antawn Jamison (12)	Juan Dixon (11)	Verizon Center; 20,173	0–4
5	November 8	@ Orlando	L 81–106	Nick Young (20)	JaVale McGee, Oleksiy Pecherov, Etan Thomas (6)	Dee Brown (5)	Amway Arena; 16,911	0–5
6	November 12	Utah	W 95–87	Caron Butler (27)	JaVale McGee (11)	Caron Butler (3)	Verizon Center; 14,885	1–5
7	November 14	@ Miami	L 77–97	Antawn Jamison (15)	Antawn Jamison (10)	Juan Dixon (3)	American Airlines Arena; 15,284	1–6
8	November 18	Miami	L 87–94	Antawn Jamison (25)	Antawn Jamison, Caron Butler (12)	Juan Dixon (5)	Verizon Center; 15,102	1–7
9	November 19	@ Atlanta	L 87–91	Caron Butler (32)	Antawn Jamison (11)	DeShawn Stevenson (5)	Philips Arena; 14,416	1–8
10	November 21	Houston	L 91–103	Antawn Jamison (27)	Antawn Jamison (10)	DeShawn Stevenson (7)	Verizon Center; 20,173	1–9
11	November 22	@ New York	L 117–122	Antawn Jamison (29)	Antawn Jamison (13)	DeShawn Stevenson (8)	Madison Square Garden; 19,763	1–10
12	November 25	Golden State	W 124–100	Caron Butler (35)	Andray Blatche (12)	DeShawn Stevenson (7)	Verizon Center; 13,852	2–10
13	November 27	Orlando	L 90–105	Caron Butler (25)	Antawn Jamison (12)	Caron Butler, DeShawn Stevenson (6)	Verizon Center; 13,295	2–11
14	November 29	Atlanta	L 98–102	Antawn Jamison (26)	Antawn Jamison (13)	Antawn Jamison, Caron Butler (5)	Verizon Center; 18,110	2–12

December: 4–12 (home: 2–6; road: 2–6)

Game	Date	Team	Score	High points	High rebounds	High assists	Location Attendance	Record
15	December 2	@ New Jersey	W 108–88	Caron Butler, Antawn Jamison (22)	Antawn Jamison (8)	Caron Butler (10)	Izod Center; 15,062	3–12
16	December 3	Portland	L 92–98	Antawn Jamison (22)	JaVale McGee (7)	Antawn Jamison (5)	Verizon Center; 12,802	3–13
17	December 5	L.A. Lakers	L 104–106	Caron Butler (26)	Andray Blatche, Antawn Jamison (12)	DeShawn Stevenson (6)	Verizon Center; 20,173	3–14
18	December 6	@ Chicago	L 110–117	Caron Butler (27)	Antawn Jamison (12)	Caron Butler (6)	United Center; 21,741	3–15
19	December 9	Detroit	W 107–94	Caron Butler (33)	Antawn Jamison (11)	Juan Dixon (7)	Verizon Center; 14,707	4–15
20	December 11	Boston	L 88–122	Caron Butler (19)	JaVale McGee (6)	Juan Dixon (7)	Verizon Center; 20,173	4–16
21	December 13	@ Philadelphia	L 89–104	Antawn Jamison (17)	Antawn Jamison (9)	Juan Dixon (5)	Wachovia Center; 15,865	4–17
22	December 15	Indiana	L 98–118	Antawn Jamison, Caron Butler (26)	Antawn Jamison (15)	Mike James (6)	Verizon Center; 14,502	4–18
23	December 17	@ Detroit	L 74–88	Mike James (16)	Antawn Jamison, Andray Blatche (11)	Andray Blatche, Caron Butler (4)	The Palace of Auburn Hills; 22,076	4–19
24	December 19	Philadelphia	L 103–109	Antawn Jamison (23)	Antawn Jamison (10)	Antawn Jamison (5)	Verizon Center; 18,323	4–20
25	December 21	Dallas	L 86–97	Antawn Jamison (22)	Mike James, Antawn Jamison (8)	Mike James (5)	Verizon Center; 15,582	4–21
26	December 23	@ Charlotte	L 72–80	Caron Butler (31)	Dominic McGuire (10)	Caron Butler (4)	Time Warner Cable Arena; 13,776	4–22
27	December 25	@ Cleveland	L 89–93	Antawn Jamison (28)	Dominic McGuire (11)	Caron Butler (10)	Quicken Loans Arena; 20,562	4–23
28	December 27	Oklahoma City	W 104–95	Antawn Jamison (29)	Andray Blatche (15)	Mike James (11)	Verizon Center; 16,181	5–23
29	December 29	@ Houston	W 89–87	Antawn Jamison (30)	Antawn Jamison (12)	Dominic McGuire (6)	Toyota Center; 18,278	6–23
30	December 30	@ New Orleans	L 85–97	Antawn Jamison (22)	Antawn Jamison (12)	Mike James (7)	New Orleans Arena; 18,021	6–24

January: 4–13 (home: 3–4; road: 1–9)

Game	Date	Team	Score	High points	High rebounds	High assists	Location Attendance	Record
31	January 2	@ Boston	L 83–108	Nick Young (15)	Antawn Jamison (9)	Caron Butler (5)	TD Banknorth Garden; 18,624	6–25
32	January 4	Cleveland	W 80–77	Antawn Jamison (26)	Antawn Jamison (13)	Andray Blatche (4)	Verizon Center; 20,173	7–25
33	January 6	@ Orlando	L 80–89	Caron Butler (29)	Antawn Jamison (9)	Caron Butler, Mike James (5)	Amway Arena; 16,011	7–26
34	January 7	Toronto	L 93–99	Antawn Jamison (32)	Antawn Jamison (7)	Caron Butler, Javaris Crittenton (6)	Verizon Center; 13,864	7–27
35	January 9	@ Chicago	L 86–98	Nick Young (28)	Antawn Jamison (11)	Caron Butler (6)	United Center; 20,125	7–28
36	January 10	Charlotte	L 89–92	Caron Butler (19)	Andray Blatche (10)	Andray Blatche (4)	Verizon Center; 20,173	7–29
37	January 12	Milwaukee	L 91–97	Nick Young (30)	Dominic McGuire (10)	Dominic McGuire (5)	Verizon Center; 13,510	7–30
38	January 14	@ New York	L 122–128	Nick Young (33)	Antawn Jamison (7)	Mike James (5)	Madison Square Garden; 18,020	7–31
39	January 16	New York	W 96–89	Antawn Jamison (28)	Andray Blatche (11)	Caron Butler (7)	Verizon Center; 17,526	8–31
40	January 19	@ Golden State	L 98–119	Andray Blatche, Antawn Jamison, Caron Butler (22)	Dominic McGuire (11)	Dominic McGuire (6)	Oracle Arena; 19,244	8–32
41	January 21	@ Sacramento	W 110–107	Antawn Jamison (33)	Dominic McGuire (12)	Caron Butler (5)	ARCO Arena; 10,821	9–32
42	January 22	@ L.A. Lakers	L 97–117	Antawn Jamison (19)	JaVale McGee (9)	Caron Butler, Mike James (6)	Staples Center; 18,997	9–33
43	January 24	@ Portland	L 87–100	Caron Butler (31)	Caron Butler (10)	Mike James (7)	Rose Garden; 20,566	9–34
44	January 26	Phoenix	L 87–103	Caron Butler (28)	Antawn Jamison (13)	Dominic McGuire (7)	Verizon Center; 17,344	9–35
45	January 28	@ Miami	L 71–93	Antawn Jamison (21)	Antawn Jamison (12)	Caron Butler (6)	American Airlines Arena; 16,424	9–36
46	January 30	@ Philadelphia	L 94–104	Antawn Jamison (25)	Antawn Jamison (15)	Javaris Crittenton (7)	Wachovia Center; 15,528	9–37
47	January 31	L.A. Clippers	W 106–94	Antawn Jamison (25)	Caron Butler (13)	Caron Butler (7)	Verizon Center; 18,227	10–37

February: 4–8 (home: 3–5; road: 1–3)

Game	Date	Team	Score	High points	High rebounds	High assists	Location Attendance	Record
48	February 2	Memphis	L 97–113	Antawn Jamison (29)	Antawn Jamison (13)	Caron Butler (5)	Verizon Center; 11,442	10–38
49	February 4	New Jersey	L 88–115	Nick Young (21)	Antawn Jamison (6)	Nick Young (4)	Verizon Center; 12,602	10–39
50	February 6	Denver	L 103–124	Antawn Jamison (26)	Dominic McGuire, Antawn Jamison (8)	Javaris Crittenton (7)	Verizon Center; 20,173	10–40
51	February 8	Indiana	W 119–117	Caron Butler (35)	Caron Butler (13)	Mike James (7)	Verizon Center; 13,708	11–40
52	February 10	@ Atlanta	L 90–111	Caron Butler (22)	Antawn Jamison (12)	Javaris Crittenton (7)	Philips Arena; 17,027	11–41
53	February 11	@ Charlotte	L 89–101	Caron Butler (26)	Antawn Jamison (9)	Caron Butler (6)	Time Warner Cable Arena; 10,237	11–42
54	February 17	Minnesota	W 111–103	Antawn Jamison (29)	Antawn Jamison (11)	Caron Butler (6)	Verizon Center; 11,623	12–42
55	February 20	@ New Jersey	W 107–96	Antawn Jamison (28)	Dominic McGuire (14)	Dominic McGuire, Javaris Crittenton, Andray Blatche (3)	Izod Center; 15,113	13–42
56	February 21	San Antonio	L 67–98	Caron Butler (24)	Caron Butler, Antawn Jamison (7)	Dominic McGuire, Caron Butler (4)	Verizon Center; 20,173	13–43
57	February 25	Philadelphia	L 98–106	Caron Butler (17)	Dominic McGuire (14)	Caron Butler (5)	Verizon Center; 16,505	13–44
58	February 27	Chicago	W 113–90	Antawn Jamison (27)	Dominic McGuire, Antawn Jamison (11)	Caron Butler (6)	Verizon Center; 18,114	14–44
59	February 28	@ Milwaukee	L 93–109	Antawn Jamison (21)	Antawn Jamison (14)	Caron Butler (6)	Bradley Center; 15,970	14–45

March: 3–13 (home: 2–5; road: 1–8)

Game	Date	Team	Score	High points	High rebounds	High assists	Location Attendance	Record
60	March 2	Atlanta	L 89–98	Antawn Jamison (23)	Antawn Jamison, JaVale McGee (9)	Dominic McGuire (9)	Verizon Center; 10,189	14–46
61	March 4	@ Oklahoma City	L 83–88	Antawn Jamison (29)	Antawn Jamison (10)	Dominic McGuire (6)	Ford Center; 18,576	14–47
62	March 6	@ San Antonio	L 78–100	Antawn Jamison (14)	Nick Young (6)	Dominic McGuire (4)	AT&T Center; 18,440	14–48
63	March 7	@ Dallas	L 103–119	Antawn Jamison (24)	Antawn Jamison (11)	Mike James (7)	American Airlines Center; 20,150	14–49
64	March 9	@ Minnesota	W 110–99	Caron Butler (27)	Caron Butler (10)	Caron Butler (6)	Target Center; 13,119	15–49
65	March 11	New Orleans	L 98–109	Antawn Jamison (25)	Antawn Jamison (10)	Caron Butler (9)	Verizon Center; 15,255	15–50
66	March 13	Orlando	L 103–112	Antawn Jamison (36)	Dominic McGuire (7)	Javaris Crittenton (7)	Verizon Center; 18,152	15–51
67	March 15	Sacramento	W 106–104	Antawn Jamison (30)	Antawn Jamison (9)	Dominic McGuire (8)	Verizon Center; 15,108	16–51
68	March 17	@ Utah	L 88–103	Nick Young, Juan Dixon (14)	Andray Blatche (13)	Darius Songaila (3)	EnergySolutions Arena; 19,911	16–52
69	March 18	@ L.A. Clippers	L 108–123	Antawn Jamison (24)	Antawn Jamison (11)	Antawn Jamison (7)	Staples Center; 15,123	16–53
70	March 20	@ Denver	L 105–116	Antawn Jamison (27)	JaVale McGee (11)	Mike James (9)	Pepsi Center; 18,231	16–54
71	March 21	@ Phoenix	L 96–128	Antawn Jamison (25)	Andray Blatche (9)	Darius Songaila (3)	US Airways Center; 18,422	16–55
72	March 23	Chicago	L 99–101	Antawn Jamison (34)	Andray Blatche (13)	Dominic McGuire (7)	Verizon Center; 15,421	16–56
73	March 25	Charlotte	W 95–93	Antawn Jamison (27)	Antawn Jamison (8)	Mike James (5)	Verizon Center; 14,657	17–56
74	March 28	Detroit	L 96–98	Antawn Jamison (21)	Caron Butler (10)	Gilbert Arenas (10)	Verizon Center; 20,173	17–57
75	March 29	@ Indiana	L 115–124	Caron Butler (31)	Caron Butler (13)	Javaris Crittenton, Caron Butler (3)	Conseco Fieldhouse; 13,729	17–58

April: 2–5 (home: 1–2; road: 1–3)

Game	Date	Team	Score	High points	High rebounds	High assists	Location Attendance	Record
76	April 1	@ Memphis	L 107–112	Caron Butler (31)	Javaris Crittenton (11)	Caron Butler (4)	FedExForum; 10,013	17–59
77	April 2	Cleveland	W 109–101	Caron Butler (25)	Brendan Haywood, Dominic McGuire (10)	Gilbert Arenas (10)	Verizon Center; 20,173	18–59
78	April 4	Miami	L 104–118	Caron Butler (27)	Brendan Haywood (12)	Javaris Crittenton (8)	Verizon Center; 20,173	18–60
79	April 8	@ Cleveland	L 86–98	Nick Young (16)	Brendan Haywood (7)	Dominic McGuire (4)	Quicken Loans Arena; 20,562	18–61
80	April 10	@ Toronto	W 100–98	Antawn Jamison (24)	Antawn Jamison (12)	Caron Butler (7)	Air Canada Centre; 18,107	19–61
81	April 13	Toronto	L 96–97	Caron Butler (28)	Caron Butler, Dominic McGuire (9)	Juan Dixon (7)	Verizon Center; 18,455	19–62
82	April 15	@ Boston	L 107–115	Caron Butler (39)	Oleksiy Pecherov (10)	Caron Butler, Javaris Crittenton (4)	TD Banknorth Garden; 18,624	19–63

2008–09 season schedule

== Playoffs ==
Did not qualify

== Player statistics ==
Legend
GP	Games played	GS	Games started	MPG	Minutes per game
FG%	Field-goal percentage	3P%	3-point field-goal percentage	FT%	Free-throw percentage
RPG	Rebounds per game	APG	Assists per game	SPG	Steals per game
BPG	Blocks per game	PPG	Points per game	Source:

=== Season ===
Player	GP	GS	MPG	FG%	3P%	FT%	RPG	APG	SPG	BPG	PPG
Antawn Jamison	81	81	38:12	46.8	35.1	75.4	8.9	1.9	1.2	0.3	22.2
Caron Butler	67	67	38:36	45.3	31.0	85.8	6.2	4.3	1.6	0.3	20.8
Gilbert Arenas	2	2	31:18	26.1	28.6	75.0	4.5	10.0	0.0	0.5	13.0
Nick Young (basketball)	82	5	22:23	44.4	34.1	85.0	1.8	1.2	0.5	0.2	10.9
Andray Blatche	71	36	24:00	47.1	23.8	70.4	5.3	1.7	0.7	1.0	10.0
Brendan Haywood	6	5	29:11	48.0	0.0	47.6	7.3	1.3	0.7	2.5	9.7
Mike James	53	50	29:41	38.7	36.7	83.8	2.4	3.6	0.8	0.1	9.6
Darius Songaila	77	29	19:48	53.2	0.0	88.9	2.9	1.2	0.8	0.3	7.4
DeShawn Stevenson	32	25	27:41	31.2	27.1	53.3	2.4	3.1	0.7	0.1	6.6
JaVale McGee	75	14	15:11	49.4	0.0	66.5	3.9	0.3	0.4	0.8	6.5
Javaris Crittenton	56	10	20:11	45.9	14.3	59.3	2.9	2.6	0.7	0.1	5.3
Juan Dixon	50	6	16:18	39.5	33.3	87.2	1.3	2.4	0.7	0.1	5.2
Antonio Daniels	13	5	22:11	40.0	45.5	75.8	1.7	3.6	0.5	0.0	5.1
Dominic McGuire	79	57	26:11	43.2	50.0	72.5	5.4	2.5	0.8	0.9	4.5
Oleksiy Pecherov	32	0	08:41	38.6	32.6	82.8	2.4	0.1	0.2	0.1	3.6
Etan Thomas	26	7	11:48	48.5	0.0	69.6	2.5	0.2	0.1	0.7	3.1
Dee Brown (basketball, born 1984)	17	11	13:41	38.6	30.0	33.3	1.7	1.9	0.6	0.0	2.4

== Transactions ==
=== Trades ===
June 26, 2008	To Washington Wizards Cash considerations	To Boston Celtics The 47th pick in the 2008 NBA draft (Bill Walker)
December 10, 2008	To Washington Wizards Mike James & Javaris Crittenton	To New Orleans Hornets Antonio Daniels To Memphis Grizzlies Conditional 1st round pick
