= Dominic McGuire =

American basketball player (born 1985)

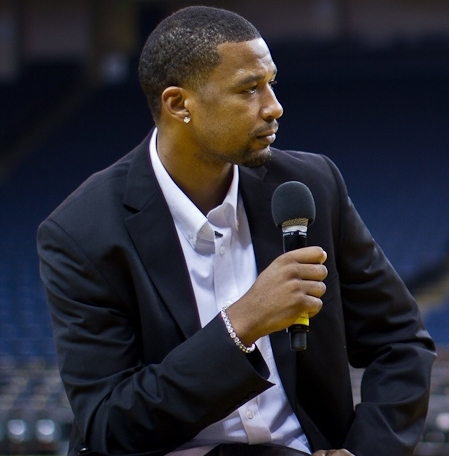
- Dominic McGuire during an interview at Oracle Arena in December 2011

Personal information
- Born: October 20, 1985 (age 41) San Diego, California, U.S.
- Listed height: 6 ft 9 in (2.06 m)
- Listed weight: 235 lb (107 kg)

Career information
- High school: Lincoln (San Diego, California)
- College: California (2003–2005); Fresno State (2006–2007)
- NBA draft: 2007: 2nd round, 47th overall pick
- Drafted by: Washington Wizards
- Playing career: 2007–2019
- Position: Small forward / power forward

Career history
- 2007–2010: Washington Wizards
- 2010: Sacramento Kings
- 2010–2011: Charlotte Bobcats
- 2011–2012: Golden State Warriors
- 2012: Toronto Raptors
- 2012–2013: New Orleans Hornets
- 2013: Indiana Pacers
- 2014: Santa Cruz Warriors
- 2014: Tulsa 66ers
- 2014: Gigantes de Guayana
- 2014: Hapoel Eilat
- 2014–2015: Hapoel Holon
- 2015–2016: Shenzhen Leopards
- 2016: Leones de Ponce
- 2018: Club Malvín
- 2018: Aguacateros de Michoacán
- 2019: Real Estelí
- Stats at NBA.com
- Stats at Basketball Reference

Dominic Rashad McGuire (born October 20, 1985) is an American former professional basketball player who last played for the Real Estelí Baloncesto.

== High school career ==
McGuire played high school prep basketball at Lincoln High School in San Diego.

== College career ==
After high school, McGuire subsequently attended the University of California, Berkeley, where he played college basketball with the Cal Golden Bears. He transferred to California State University, Fresno to play with the Fresno State Bulldogs, after his sophomore year of college, when he was the fourth-leading scorer for the Cal Golden Bears the during the 2004–05 season.

== Professional career ==
=== Washington Wizards (2007–2010) ===
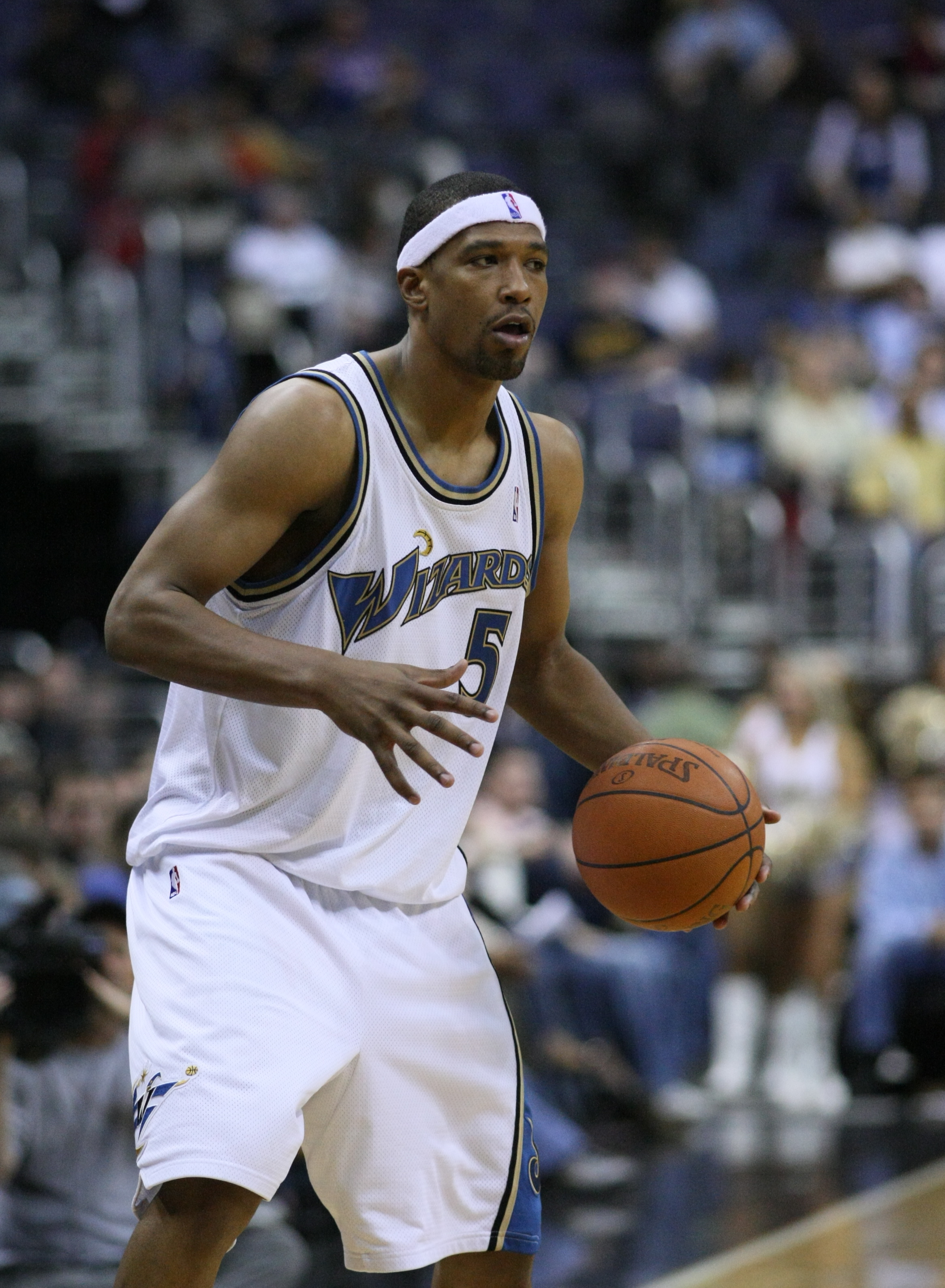
McGuire with the Washington Wizards in November 2008

McGuire was selected in the second round (47th overall) of the 2007 NBA draft out of Fresno State by the Washington Wizards. On August 13, 2007, McGuire signed a 3-year deal with the Washington Wizards. On April 16, 2008, McGuire got his first start in his NBA career, against the Orlando Magic.

=== Sacramento Kings (2010) ===
On February 18, 2010, he was traded to the Sacramento Kings for a protected 2010 2nd round draft pick.

=== Charlotte Bobcats (2010–2011) ===
On July 22, 2010, he signed with the Charlotte Bobcats. On February 24, 2011, McGuire was waived by the Bobcats following a trade between the Bobcats and Portland Trail Blazers. However, he was re-signed on March 3, 2011.

=== Golden State Warriors (2011–2012) ===
On December 15, 2011, McGuire signed with the Golden State Warriors.

=== Toronto Raptors (2012) ===
On September 12, 2012, he signed with the Toronto Raptors. He was waived on November 30, 2012, when the team signed Mickael Pietrus.

=== New Orleans Hornets (2012–2013) ===
On December 16, 2012, McGuire signed with the New Orleans Hornets. He was waived by the Hornets on January 4, 2013.

=== Indiana Pacers (2013) ===
On January 7, 2013, McGuire signed with the Indiana Pacers on a 10-day contract. He was signed to another 10-day contract on January 17, 2013.

=== Utah Jazz (2013) ===
On September 26, 2013, he signed with the Utah Jazz. He was later waived by the Jazz on October 26.

=== Santa Cruz Warriors (2014) ===
In January 2014, he was acquired by the NBA D-League's Santa Cruz Warriors. In March 2014, he was traded to the NBA D-League's Tulsa 66ers.

=== Gigantes de Guayana (2014) ===
In April 2014, he signed with Gigantes de Guayana of Venezuela for the rest of the 2014 LPB season.

=== Hapoel Eilat (2014) ===
On August 27, 2014, he signed to play in Israel with Hapoel Eilat of the Israeli Basketball Premier League.

=== Hapoel Holon (2014–2015) ===
On November 6, 2014, he left Eilat and signed with another Israeli club, Hapoel Holon for the rest of the season.

=== Shenzhen Leopards (2015–2016) ===
In August 2015, McGuire signed with the Shenzhen Leopards of China for the 2015–16 CBA season.

=== Leones de Ponce (2016) ===
On February 26, 2016, he signed with the Leones de Ponce of Puerto Rico for the 2016 BSN season. On April 14, 2016, he parted ways with Leones de Ponce.

=== Club Malvín (2018) ===
On April 19, 2018, McGuire was reported to have signed with Club Malvín of the Liga Uruguaya de Basketball.

=== Aguacateros de Michoacán (2018–present) ===
In December 2018, McGuire joined Mexican team Aguacateros de Michoacán of the Liga Nacional de Baloncesto Profesional.

== NBA career statistics ==
Legend
GP	Games played	GS	Games started	MPG	Minutes per game
FG%	Field goal percentage	3P%	3-point field goal percentage	FT%	Free throw percentage
RPG	Rebounds per game	APG	Assists per game	SPG	Steals per game
BPG	Blocks per game	PPG	Points per game	**Bold**	Career high

=== Regular season ===
Year	Team	GP	GS	MPG	FG%	3P%	FT%	RPG	APG	SPG	BPG	PPG
2007–08	Washington	70	1	9.9	.379	.167	.438	2.0	.6	.3	.4	1.3
2008–09	Washington	**79**	**57**	**26.2**	.432	**.500**	.725	**5.4**	**2.5**	.8	**.9**	**4.5**
2009–10	Washington	41	0	5.9	.375	.000	.000	1.5	.2	.1	.1	.7
2009–10	Sacramento	10	2	6.7	.333	.000	.000	1.8	.3	.1	.1	.8
2010–11	Charlotte	52	8	14.6	.396	.000	**.769**	3.8	.8	.2	.6	3.3
2011–12	Golden State	64	6	17.6	.448	.000	.736	3.8	1.7	.7	.6	3.5
2012–13	Toronto	15	9	15.3	**.469**	.000	.333	3.2	.7	.3	.5	2.1
2012–13	New Orleans	9	0	16.1	.429	.000	.500	3.1	1.0	**.9**	.3	2.1
2012–13	Indiana	2	1	6.0	.000	.000	.000	1.0	.5	.0	.0	.0
Career		342	84	15.6	.419	.188	.658	3.4	1.2	.5	.5	2.7

=== Playoffs ===
Year	Team	GP	GS	MPG	FG%	3P%	FT%	RPG	APG	SPG	BPG	PPG
2008	Washington	3	0	5.0	.000	.000	.500	1.0	.3	.3	.3	.3
Career		3	0	5.0	.000	.000	.500	1.0	.3	.3	.3	.3

=== Career highs ===
- Points: **16** @ Philadelphia 01/30/09
- Rebounds: **17** @ Atlanta 12/17/10
- Assists: **9** vs. Atlanta 03/02/09
- Steals: **4** vs. Phoenix 01/26/09
- Blocks: **4** 3 times
