= 2010–11 Charlotte Bobcats season =

NBA professional basketball team season

- Head coach: Larry Brown (games 1-28); Paul Silas (games 29-82)
- General manager: Rod Higgins
- Owner: Michael Jordan
- Arena: Time Warner Cable Arena

Results
- Record: 34–48 (.415)
- Place: Division: 4th (Southeast); Conference: 10th (Eastern)
- Playoff finish: Did not qualify
- Stats at Basketball Reference

Local media
- Television: Fox Sports Carolinas, SportSouth
- Radio: WFNZ

The 2010–11 Charlotte Bobcats season was the 21st season of NBA Basketball in Charlotte in the National Basketball Association (NBA), and their 7th as the Charlotte Bobcats.

== Key dates ==
- June 24: The 2010 NBA draft took place in New York City.
- July 1 – The free agency period begun.

== Roster ==
Charlotte Bobcats roster
Players

| Pos. | No. | Player | Height | Weight | DOB | From |
|---|---|---|---|---|---|---|
| G | 14 | D. J. Augustin | 6 ft 0 in (1.83 m) | 180 lb (82 kg) | | Texas |
| C | 54 | Kwame Brown | 6 ft 11 in (2.11 m) | 270 lb (122 kg) | | Glynn Academy |
| G | 33 | Matt Carroll | 6 ft 6 in (1.98 m) | 212 lb (96 kg) | | Notre Dame |
| F | 44 | Dante Cunningham | 6 ft 8 in (2.03 m) | 230 lb (104 kg) | | Villanova |
| F | 32 | Boris Diaw | 6 ft 8 in (2.03 m) | 235 lb (107 kg) | | France |
| C | 7 | DeSagana Diop (injured) | 7 ft 0 in (2.13 m) | 280 lb (127 kg) | | Oak Hill Academy (Virginia) |
| G | 15 | Gerald Henderson | 6 ft 5 in (1.96 m) | 215 lb (98 kg) | | Duke |
| SG | 1 | Stephen Jackson | 6 ft 8 in (2.03 m) | 215 lb (98 kg) | | Oak Hill Academy (Virginia) |
| G | 2 | Shaun Livingston | 6 ft 7 in (2.01 m) | 185 lb (84 kg) | | Peoria Central (IL) |
| F | 5 | Dominic McGuire | 6 ft 8 in (2.03 m) | 220 lb (100 kg) | | Fresno State |
| F | 21 | Eduardo Nájera | 6 ft 8 in (2.03 m) | 235 lb (107 kg) | | Oklahoma |
| C | 10 | Joel Przybilla | 7 ft 1 in (2.16 m) | 245 lb (111 kg) | | Minnesota |
| F | 12 | Tyrus Thomas (injured) | 6 ft 10 in (2.08 m) | 225 lb (102 kg) | | LSU |
| F | 41 | Garrett Temple | 6 ft 6 in (1.98 m) | 195 lb (88 kg) | | LSU |
| F | 8 | D. J. White | 6 ft 9 in (2.06 m) | 251 lb (114 kg) | | Indiana |

Coaches
Head coach
- Paul Silas (Creighton)
Assistant(s)
- Charles Oakley (Virginia Union)
- Stephen Silas (Brown)
- Ralph Lewis (La Salle)

Legend
- (DP) Unsigned draft pick
- (FA) Free agent
- (S) Suspended
- Injured

== Pre-season ==
=== Game log ===
2010 pre-season game log
Pre-season: 4–4 (home: 3–1; road: 1–3)

| Game | Date | Team | Score | High points | High rebounds | High assists | Location Attendance | Record |
|---|---|---|---|---|---|---|---|---|
| 1 | October 5 | @ Cleveland | L 72–87 | D. J. Augustin (14) | Gerald Wallace (9) | Boris Diaw (4) | Quicken Loans Arena n/a | 0–1 |
| 2 | October 6 | Oklahoma City | L 93–97 | Tyrus Thomas (16) | Tyrus Thomas (7) | D. J. Augustin (6) | Crown Coliseum; 7,491 | 0–2 |
| 3 | October 9 | @ Milwaukee | L 78–86 | Gerald Wallace (15) | Darius Miles (7) | Gerald Wallace (5) | Resch Center; 5,467 | 0–3 |
| 4 | October 14 | @ Orlando | L 73–86 | D. J. Augustin (17) | Boris Diaw (7) | D. J. Augustin (4) | Amway Center; 18,846 | 0–4 |
| 5 | October 16 | Detroit | W 97–94 | Tyrus Thomas (23) | Tyrus Thomas (7) | D. J. Augustin (8) | Colonial Life Arena; 6,847 | 1–4 |
| 6 | October 18 | @ Miami | W 102–96 | D. J. Augustin (19) | Gerald Henderson (6) | Stephen Jackson (6) | American Airlines Arena; 18,557 | 2–4 |
| 7 | October 20 | New Orleans | W 105–98 | Stephen Jackson (25) | Gerald Wallace (13) | Boris Diaw (7) | Time Warner Cable Arena; 19,077 | 3–4 |
| 8 | October 22 | Atlanta | W 99–66 | Stephen Jackson (21) | Stephen Jackson, Gerald Wallace, Derrick Brown (8) | D. J. Augustin (5) | Time Warner Cable Arena; 8,849 | 4–4 |

2010–11 season schedule

== Regular season ==
=== Standings ===
| Southeast Division | W | L | PCT | GB | Home | Road | Div |
|---|---|---|---|---|---|---|---|
| y-Miami Heat | 58 | 24 | .707 | – | 30–11 | 28–13 | 13–3 |
| x-Orlando Magic | 52 | 30 | .634 | 6 | 29–12 | 23–18 | 11–5 |
| x-Atlanta Hawks | 44 | 38 | .537 | 14 | 24–17 | 20–21 | 9–7 |
| Charlotte Bobcats | 34 | 48 | .415 | 24 | 21–20 | 13–28 | 4–12 |
| Washington Wizards | 23 | 59 | .280 | 35 | 20–21 | 3–38 | 3–13 |

| # | Eastern Conference | | | | |
| # | Team | W | L | PCT | GB |
|---|---|---|---|---|---|
| 1 | z-Chicago Bulls | 62 | 20 | .756 | – |
| 2 | y-Miami Heat | 58 | 24 | .707 | 4 |
| 3 | y-Boston Celtics | 56 | 26 | .683 | 6 |
| 4 | x-Orlando Magic | 52 | 30 | .634 | 10 |
| 5 | x-Atlanta Hawks | 44 | 38 | .537 | 18 |
| 6 | x-New York Knicks | 42 | 40 | .512 | 20 |
| 7 | x-Philadelphia 76ers | 41 | 41 | .500 | 21 |
| 8 | x-Indiana Pacers | 37 | 45 | .451 | 25 |
| 9 | Milwaukee Bucks | 35 | 47 | .427 | 27 |
| 10 | Charlotte Bobcats | 34 | 48 | .415 | 28 |
| 11 | Detroit Pistons | 30 | 52 | .366 | 32 |
| 12 | New Jersey Nets | 24 | 58 | .293 | 38 |
| 13 | Washington Wizards | 23 | 59 | .280 | 39 |
| 14 | Toronto Raptors | 22 | 60 | .268 | 40 |
| 15 | Cleveland Cavaliers | 19 | 63 | .232 | 43 |

=== Game log ===
2010–11 game log
Total: 34–48 (Home: 21–20; Road: 13–28)
October: 0–3 (home: 0–1; road: 0–2)

| Game | Date | Team | Score | High points | High rebounds | High assists | Location Attendance | Record |
|---|---|---|---|---|---|---|---|---|
| 1 | October 27 | @ Dallas | L 86–101 | Tyrus Thomas (22) | Gerald Wallace (9) | D. J. Augustin (5) | American Airlines Center; 19,440 | 0–1 |
| 2 | October 29 | Indiana | L 101–104 | Gerald Wallace (29) | Boris Diaw (8) | D. J. Augustin, Stephen Jackson (6) | Time Warner Cable Arena; 18,351 | 0–2 |
| 3 | October 30 | @ Milwaukee | L 88–98 | D. J. Augustin (26) | Tyrus Thomas (7) | D. J. Augustin (5) | Bradley Center; 16,519 | 0–3 |

November: 6–8 (home: 3–4; road: 3–4)

| Game | Date | Team | Score | High points | High rebounds | High assists | Location Attendance | Record |
|---|---|---|---|---|---|---|---|---|
| 4 | November 3 | @ New Jersey | W 85–83 | Boris Diaw (24) | Gerald Wallace (11) | D. J. Augustin (7) | Prudential Center; 11,778 | 1–3 |
| 5 | November 5 | @ Detroit | L 90–97 | Stephen Jackson (28) | Boris Diaw, Derrick Brown (7) | D. J. Augustin (8) | The Palace of Auburn Hills; 13,291 | 1–4 |
| 6 | November 6 | Orlando | L 88–91 | Gerald Wallace (25) | Gerald Wallace (14) | D. J. Augustin (8) | Time Warner Cable Arena; 18,136 | 1–5 |
| 7 | November 8 | San Antonio | L 91–95 | Tyrus Thomas (16) | Tyrus Thomas (8) | D. J. Augustin (6) | Time Warner Cable Arena; 14,152 | 1–6 |
| 8 | November 10 | @ Toronto | W 101–96 | Stephen Jackson (20) | Gerald Wallace (14) | D. J. Augustin (7) | Air Canada Centre; 14,309 | 2–6 |
| 9 | November 12 | @ Washington | W 93–85 | Gerald Wallace (25) | Gerald Wallace (14) | D. J. Augustin (10) | Verizon Center; 14,855 | 3–6 |
| 10 | November 13 | Utah | L 95–96 | Stephen Jackson (24) | Nazr Mohammed (20) | D. J. Augustin (10) | Time Warner Cable Arena; 15,486 | 3–7 |
| 11 | November 15 | Minnesota | W 113–110 | Stephen Jackson, Gerald Wallace (26) | Tyrus Thomas (10) | D. J. Augustin (11) | Time Warner Cable Arena; 11,211 | 4–7 |
| 12 | November 19 | @ Miami | L 87–95 | Stephen Jackson (30) | Gerald Wallace (9) | Boris Diaw (7) | American Airlines Arena; 19,600 | 4–8 |
| 13 | November 20 | Phoenix | W 123–105 | Boris Diaw (26) | Stephen Jackson (10) | Stephen Jackson (10) | Time Warner Cable Arena; 16,428 | 5–8 |
| 14 | November 23 | @ New York | L 107–110 | D. J. Augustin (24) | Gerald Wallace (8) | D. J. Augustin (7) | Madison Square Garden; 19,763 | 5–9 |
| 15 | November 24 | New York | L 95–99 | Tyrus Thomas (26) | Tyrus Thomas (11) | D. J. Augustin (7) | Time Warner Cable Arena; 15,588 | 5–10 |
| 16 | November 26 | Houston | W 99–89 | Gerald Wallace (21) | Gerald Wallace (14) | D. J. Augustin (11) | Time Warner Cable Arena; 16,473 | 6–10 |
| 17 | November 27 | @ Milwaukee | L 101–104 | D. J. Augustin (26) | Dominic McGuire (15) | D. J. Augustin (6) | Bradley Center; 15,213 | 6–11 |

December: 5–9 (home: 5–3; road: 0–6)

| Game | Date | Team | Score | High points | High rebounds | High assists | Location Attendance | Record |
|---|---|---|---|---|---|---|---|---|
| 18 | December 1 | @ New Orleans | L 73–89 | Gerald Wallace (18) | Tyrus Thomas (10) | D. J. Augustin (6) | New Orleans Arena; 10,866 | 6–12 |
| 19 | December 3 | New Jersey | W 91–84 (OT) | Stephen Jackson (25) | Boris Diaw (16) | Boris Diaw (8) | Time Warner Cable Arena; 12,183 | 7–12 |
| 20 | December 4 | @ Philadelphia | L 91–109 | Boris Diaw (19) | Kwame Brown (7) | Boris Diaw (6) | Wells Fargo Center; 14,611 | 7–13 |
| 21 | December 7 | Denver | W 100–98 | Stephen Jackson (23) | Stephen Jackson, Gerald Wallace (9) | Stephen Jackson (7) | Time Warner Cable Arena; 15,737 | 8–13 |
| 22 | December 10 | @ Indiana | L 92–100 | Gerald Wallace (26) | Gerald Wallace (13) | Stephen Jackson (8) | Conseco Fieldhouse; 13,128 | 8–14 |
| 23 | December 11 | Boston | L 62–93 | Nazr Mohammed (14) | Kwame Brown (9) | Stephen Jackson (7) | Time Warner Cable Arena; 19,603 | 8–15 |
| 24 | December 14 | Toronto | W 97–91 | Nazr Mohammed (18) | Nazr Mohammed (8) | D. J. Augustin (7) | Time Warner Cable Arena; 12,482 | 9–15 |
| 25 | December 15 | @ Memphis | L 80–113 | Stephen Jackson (16) | Dominic McGuire (7) | D. J. Augustin (7) | FedExForum; 12,219 | 9–16 |
| 26 | December 17 | @ Atlanta | L 85–90 | D. J. Augustin, Boris Diaw (22) | Dominic McGuire (17) | Shaun Livingston (5) | Philips Arena; 15,006 | 9–17 |
| 27 | December 20 | @ Washington | L 75–108 | Stephen Jackson (13) | Boris Diaw (7) | D. J. Augustin, Boris Diaw (4) | Verizon Center; 13,825 | 9–18 |
| 28 | December 21 | Oklahoma City | L 81–99 | Stephen Jackson (20) | Boris Diaw (7) | Boris Diaw (8) | Time Warner Cable Arena; 16,876 | 9–19 |
| 29 | December 27 | Detroit | W 105–100 | D. J. Augustin (27) | Stephen Jackson (9) | Boris Diaw (6) | Time Warner Cable Arena; 14,418 | 10–19 |
| 30 | December 29 | Cleveland | W 101–92 | Stephen Jackson (38) | Gerald Wallace (10) | D. J. Augustin (6) | Time Warner Cable Arena; 15,287 | 11–19 |
| 31 | December 31 | Golden State | L 95–96 | Stephen Jackson (22) | Dominic McGuire, Nazr Mohammed, Gerald Wallace (8) | D. J. Augustin (6) | Time Warner Cable Arena; 16,249 | 11–20 |

January: 9–7 (home: 4–3; road: 5–4)

| Game | Date | Team | Score | High points | High rebounds | High assists | Location Attendance | Record |
|---|---|---|---|---|---|---|---|---|
| 32 | January 3 | Miami | L 82–96 | Stephen Jackson (22) | Kwame Brown, Dominic McGuire (7) | Boris Diaw, Stephen Jackson (5) | Time Warner Cable Arena; 19,233 | 11–21 |
| 33 | January 5 | @ Minnesota | W 108–105 (OT) | Tyrus Thomas (21) | Kwame Brown (14) | D. J. Augustin (8) | Target Center; 14,881 | 12–21 |
| 34 | January 8 | Washington | W 104–89 | Stephen Jackson (21) | Boris Diaw, Stephen Jackson (10) | D. J. Augustin (9) | Time Warner Cable Arena; 16,038 | 13–21 |
| 35 | January 10 | Memphis | W 96–82 | Stephen Jackson (27) | Boris Diaw (9) | D. J. Augustin (9) | Time Warner Cable Arena; 10,188 | 14–21 |
| 36 | January 12 | Chicago | W 96–91 | D. J. Augustin (22) | Tyrus Thomas (13) | D. J. Augustin (12) | Time Warner Cable Arena; 12,468 | 15–21 |
| 37 | January 14 | @ Boston | L 94–99 | Gerald Wallace (20) | Tyrus Thomas (9) | D. J. Augustin (6) | TD Garden; 18,624 | 15–22 |
| 38 | January 15 | New Orleans | L 81–88 | Stephen Jackson, Gerald Wallace (15) | Kwame Brown (14) | D. J. Augustin (7) | Time Warner Cable Arena; 17,486 | 15–23 |
| 39 | January 17 | @ Philadelphia | L 92–96 (OT) | Boris Diaw (25) | Kwame Brown (16) | Boris Diaw (11) | Wells Fargo Center; 13,508 | 15–24 |
| 40 | January 18 | @ Chicago | W 83–82 | D. J. Augustin (15) | Gerald Wallace (16) | D. J. Augustin (5) | United Center; 21,263 | 16–24 |
| 41 | January 20 | Philadelphia | W 100–97 | D. J. Augustin (31) | Kwame Brown (9) | D. J. Augustin (8) | Time Warner Cable Arena; 14,326 | 17–24 |
| 42 | January 22 | Atlanta | L 87–103 | D. J. Augustin (20) | Gerald Wallace (8) | D. J. Augustin (7) | Time Warner Cable Arena; 17,286 | 17–25 |
| 43 | January 25 | @ Sacramento | W 94–89 | Stephen Jackson (21) | Kwame Brown (18) | Shaun Livingston (3) | ARCO Arena; 13,984 | 18–25 |
| 44 | January 26 | @ Phoenix | W 114–107 | Stephen Jackson (23) | Kwame Brown, Gerald Wallace (10) | D. J. Augustin (10) | US Airways Center; 16,986 | 19–25 |
| 45 | January 28 | @ Golden State | W 121–113 (OT) | Stephen Jackson (31) | Stephen Jackson (7) | D. J. Augustin (12) | Oracle Arena; 18,407 | 20–25 |
| 46 | January 29 | @ L.A. Clippers | L 88–103 | Gerald Henderson, Stephen Jackson (14) | Kwame Brown (12) | Boris Diaw (5) | Staples Center; 18,332 | 20–26 |
| 47 | January 31 | @ Utah | L 78–83 | Stephen Jackson (24) | D. J. Augustin, Stephen Jackson (8) | D. J. Augustin (7) | EnergySolutions Arena; 19,499 | 20–27 |

February: 6–6 (home: 4–3; road: 2–3)

| Game | Date | Team | Score | High points | High rebounds | High assists | Location Attendance | Record |
|---|---|---|---|---|---|---|---|---|
| 48 | February 2 | @ Detroit | W 97–87 | Stephen Jackson (39) | Kwame Brown (10) | Boris Diaw (9) | The Palace of Auburn Hills; 14,376 | 21–27 |
| 49 | February 4 | Miami | L 97–109 | Stephen Jackson, Gerald Wallace (25) | Gerald Wallace (10) | D. J. Augustin (8) | Time Warner Cable Arena; 19,592 | 21–28 |
| 50 | February 5 | Dallas | L 92–101 | D. J. Augustin (21) | Gerald Wallace (11) | Stephen Jackson (5) | Time Warner Cable Arena; 17,743 | 21–29 |
| 51 | February 7 | Boston | W 94–89 | Gerald Wallace (19) | Gerald Wallace (16) | D. J. Augustin (4) | Time Warner Cable Arena; 19,081 | 22–29 |
| 52 | February 9 | @ Indiana | L 103–104 | Stephen Jackson (27) | Gerald Wallace (9) | Gerald Wallace (6) | Conseco Fieldhouse; 10,268 | 22–30 |
| 53 | February 11 | New Jersey | L 89–94 | Stephen Jackson (21) | Gerald Wallace (9) | Boris Diaw, Stephen Jackson (4) | Time Warner Cable Arena; 15,386 | 22–31 |
| 54 | February 12 | @ Atlanta | W 88–86 | Stephen Jackson (32) | Gerald Wallace (13) | Gerald Wallace (7) | Philips Arena; 16,948 | 23–31 |
| 55 | February 14 | L.A. Lakers | W 109–89 | Gerald Wallace (20) | Gerald Wallace (11) | D. J. Augustin (9) | Time Warner Cable Arena; 19,488 | 24–31 |
| 56 | February 15 | @ Chicago | L 94–106 | Gerald Henderson (22) | Gerald Wallace (8) | Stephen Jackson (6) | United Center; 21,391 | 24–32 |
All-Star Break
| 57 | February 22 | Toronto | W 114–101 | D. J. Augustin (23) | Nazr Mohammed (14) | Boris Diaw (9) | Time Warner Cable Arena; 12,976 | 25–32 |
| 58 | February 25 | Sacramento | W 110–98 | Stephen Jackson (30) | Kwame Brown (13) | Shaun Livingston (5) | Time Warner Cable Arena; 15,782 | 26–32 |
| 59 | February 27 | @ Orlando | L 86–100 | Stephen Jackson (35) | Boris Diaw (9) | D. J. Augustin (4) | Amway Center; 18,846 | 26–33 |

March: 6–9 (home: 4–3; road: 2–6)

| Game | Date | Team | Score | High points | High rebounds | High assists | Location Attendance | Record |
|---|---|---|---|---|---|---|---|---|
| 60 | March 2 | @ Denver | L 80–120 | Matt Carroll (19) | Boris Diaw (6) | Shaun Livingston (7) | Pepsi Center; 14,255 | 26–34 |
| 61 | March 4 | @ L.A. Lakers | L 84–92 | D. J. Augustin (22) | Dominic McGuire, Joel Przybilla (8) | D. J. Augustin, Shaun Livingston (4) | Staples Center; 18,997 | 26–35 |
| 62 | March 5 | @ Portland | L 69–93 | Gerald Henderson (16) | D. J. White (9) | Boris Diaw (5) | Rose Garden; 20,588 | 26–36 |
| 63 | March 7 | L.A. Clippers | L 87–92 | Gerald Henderson (20) | Boris Diaw (8) | Boris Diaw (8) | Time Warner Cable Arena; 16,438 | 26–37 |
| 64 | March 9 | Chicago | L 84–101 | Gerald Henderson (20) | Kwame Brown (11) | Gerald Henderson (8) | Time Warner Cable Arena; 15,286 | 26–38 |
| 65 | March 11 | Portland | W 97–92 | Stephen Jackson (29) | Stephen Jackson (10) | D. J. Augustin (5) | Time Warner Cable Arena; 18,176 | 27–38 |
| 66 | March 13 | @ Toronto | W 95–90 | D. J. Augustin (23) | Kwame Brown, Stephen Jackson (5) | Boris Diaw (6) | Air Canada Centre; 16,557 | 28–38 |
| 67 | March 16 | @ Houston | L 78–94 | D. J. Augustin (22) | Kwame Brown, D. J. White (6) | D. J. Augustin, Stephen Jackson (4) | Toyota Center; 14,822 | 28–39 |
| 68 | March 18 | @ Oklahoma City | L 82–99 | Stephen Jackson (18) | Kwame Brown (8) | D. J. Augustin (8) | Oklahoma City Arena; 18,203 | 28–40 |
| 69 | March 19 | @ San Antonio | L 98–109 | Gerald Henderson (19) | Kwame Brown (7) | Shaun Livingston (8) | AT&T Center; 19,075 | 28–41 |
| 70 | March 23 | Indiana | L 88–111 | D. J. Augustin (17) | Kwame Brown (9) | Boris Diaw (7) | Time Warner Cable Arena; 14,703 | 28–42 |
| 71 | March 25 | @ Boston | W 83–81 | D. J. White (17) | Kwame Brown, Dominic McGuire (7) | D. J. Augustin (4) | TD Garden; 18,624 | 29–42 |
| 72 | March 26 | New York | W 114–106 | Boris Diaw (20) | Boris Diaw (8) | D. J. Augustin (9) | Time Warner Cable Arena; 19,356 | 30–42 |
| 73 | March 28 | Milwaukee | W 87–86 | Stephen Jackson (18) | Tyrus Thomas (6) | D. J. Augustin, Boris Diaw (8) | Time Warner Cable Arena; 12,368 | 31–42 |
| 74 | March 30 | Cleveland | W 98–97 | Boris Diaw (26) | Kwame Brown (8) | D. J. Augustin (12) | Time Warner Cable Arena; 12,584 | 32–42 |

April: 2–6 (home: 1–3; road: 1–3)

| Game | Date | Team | Score | High points | High rebounds | High assists | Location Attendance | Record |
|---|---|---|---|---|---|---|---|---|
| 75 | April 1 | @ Orlando | L 77–89 | Dante Cunningham (21) | Kwame Brown (11) | D. J. Augustin, Boris Diaw (6) | Amway Center; 18,969 | 32–43 |
| 76 | April 3 | Washington | L 91–97 | Matt Carroll (26) | D. J. White (8) | D. J. Augustin (7) | Time Warner Cable Arena; 16,444 | 32–44 |
| 77 | April 5 | @ Cleveland | L 89–99 | D. J. Augustin (22) | Dante Cunningham, Boris Diaw (11) | D. J. Augustin (8) | Quicken Loans Arena; 19,835 | 32–45 |
| 78 | April 6 | Orlando | L 102–111 (OT) | Gerald Henderson (32) | Dante Cunningham (10) | Boris Diaw (9) | Time Warner Cable Arena; 16,234 | 32–46 |
| 79 | April 8 | @ Miami | L 103–112 | Kwame Brown (23) | Kwame Brown (13) | Dominic McGuire (3) | American Airlines Arena; 19,897 | 32–47 |
| 80 | April 10 | Detroit | L 101–112 | Gerald Henderson (21) | Kwame Brown (7) | D. J. Augustin (14) | Time Warner Cable Arena; 16,234 | 32–48 |
| 81 | April 11 | @ New Jersey | W 105–103 | Dante Cunningham (21) | Kwame Brown (7) | D. J. Augustin (10) | Prudential Center; 13,853 | 33–48 |
| 82 | April 13 | Atlanta | W 96–85 | Gerald Henderson (20) | Kwame Brown (8) | Boris Diaw (9) | Time Warner Cable Arena; 16,138 | 34–48 |

2010–11 season schedule

== Player statistics ==
=== Regular season ===
| Player | POS | GP | GS | MP | REB | AST | STL | BLK | PTS | MPG | RPG | APG | SPG | BPG | PPG |
|---|---|---|---|---|---|---|---|---|---|---|---|---|---|---|---|
| Boris Diaw | PF | 82 | 82 | 2,778 | 414 | 337 | 74 | 46 | 924 | 33.9 | 5.0 | 4.1 | .9 | .6 | 11.3 |
| D. J. Augustin | PG | 82 | 82 | 2,757 | 225 | 498 | 54 | 3 | 1,178 | 33.6 | 2.7 | 6.1 | .7 | .0 | 14.4 |
| Shaun Livingston | PG | 73 | 0 | 1,261 | 149 | 164 | 47 | 29 | 479 | 17.3 | 2.0 | 2.2 | .6 | .4 | 6.6 |
| Gerald Henderson Jr. | SG | 68 | 30 | 1,661 | 207 | 101 | 50 | 32 | 653 | 24.4 | 3.0 | 1.5 | .7 | .5 | 9.6 |
| Stephen Jackson | SG | 67 | 67 | 2,405 | 304 | 241 | 80 | 28 | 1,240 | 35.9 | 4.5 | 3.6 | 1.2 | .4 | 18.5 |
| Kwame Brown | C | 66 | 50 | 1,714 | 450 | 43 | 26 | 39 | 524 | 26.0 | 6.8 | .7 | .4 | .6 | 7.9 |
| Matt Carroll | SG | 54 | 1 | 582 | 68 | 23 | 17 | 6 | 235 | 10.8 | 1.3 | .4 | .3 | .1 | 4.4 |
| Dominic McGuire | SF | 52 | 8 | 760 | 199 | 43 | 10 | 33 | 174 | 14.6 | 3.8 | .8 | .2 | .6 | 3.3 |
| Nazr Mohammed^{†} | C | 51 | 30 | 851 | 252 | 17 | 14 | 46 | 370 | 16.7 | 4.9 | .3 | .3 | .9 | 7.3 |
| Gerald Wallace^{†} | SF | 48 | 48 | 1,872 | 394 | 116 | 59 | 48 | 749 | 39.0 | 8.2 | 2.4 | 1.2 | 1.0 | 15.6 |
| Tyrus Thomas | C | 41 | 2 | 861 | 224 | 29 | 30 | 66 | 419 | 21.0 | 5.5 | .7 | .7 | 1.6 | 10.2 |
| Derrick Brown^{†} | SF | 41 | 1 | 488 | 84 | 29 | 16 | 8 | 151 | 11.9 | 2.0 | .7 | .4 | .2 | 3.7 |
| Eduardo Nájera | PF | 31 | 0 | 372 | 44 | 20 | 11 | 6 | 69 | 12.0 | 1.4 | .6 | .4 | .2 | 2.2 |
| D. J. White^{†} | C | 24 | 0 | 466 | 106 | 15 | 6 | 12 | 203 | 19.4 | 4.4 | .6 | .3 | .5 | 8.5 |
| Dante Cunningham^{†} | PF | 22 | 9 | 529 | 88 | 13 | 15 | 11 | 198 | 24.0 | 4.0 | .6 | .7 | .5 | 9.0 |
| Sherron Collins | PG | 20 | 0 | 66 | 5 | 8 | 2 | 0 | 17 | 3.3 | .3 | .4 | .1 | .0 | .9 |
| DeSagana Diop | C | 16 | 0 | 181 | 40 | 7 | 4 | 15 | 20 | 11.3 | 2.5 | .4 | .3 | .9 | 1.3 |
| Garrett Temple^{†} | PG | 12 | 0 | 126 | 15 | 24 | 9 | 4 | 38 | 10.5 | 1.3 | 2.0 | .8 | .3 | 3.2 |
| Joel Przybilla^{†} | C | 5 | 0 | 74 | 24 | 0 | 0 | 1 | 9 | 14.8 | 4.8 | .0 | .0 | .2 | 1.8 |

- ^{†} Denotes player spent time with another team in the season. Stats reflect time with the Bobcats only.

== Injuries and surgeries ==
- Stephen Jackson with Hamstring injury

== Transactions ==
=== Trades ===
July 13, 2010
To Charlotte Bobcats----
- (United States) Erick Dampier
  (United States) Matt Carroll
  (Mexico) Eduardo Nájera
  cash considerations
To Dallas Mavericks----
- (United States) Tyson Chandler
  (France) Alexis Ajinça
February 24, 2011
To Charlotte Bobcats----
- (United States) D. J. White
- (United States) Morris Peterson
To Oklahoma City Thunder----
- (United States) Nazr Mohammed
February 24, 2011
To Charlotte Bobcats----
- (United States) Dante Cunningham
- (United States) Joel Przybilla
- (New Zealand) Sean Marks
- 2011 first-round pick
- 2013 first-round pick
- Cash considerations
To Portland Trail Blazers----
- (United States) Gerald Wallace

=== Free agents ===
==== Additions ====
| Player | Signed | Former Team |
|---|---|---|
| Tyrus Thomas | Signed 5-year contract for $40 million | Charlotte Bobcats |
| Shaun Livingston | Signed 2-year contract for $7 million | Washington Wizards |

==== Subtractions ====
| Player | Reason left | New team |
|---|---|---|
| Raymond Felton | Free agent | New York Knicks |
| Theo Ratliff | Free agent | Los Angeles Lakers |
| Derrick Brown | Waived | New York Knicks |
| Sherron Collins | Waived | |
