= Eddie Jordan (basketball) =

American basketball player and coach

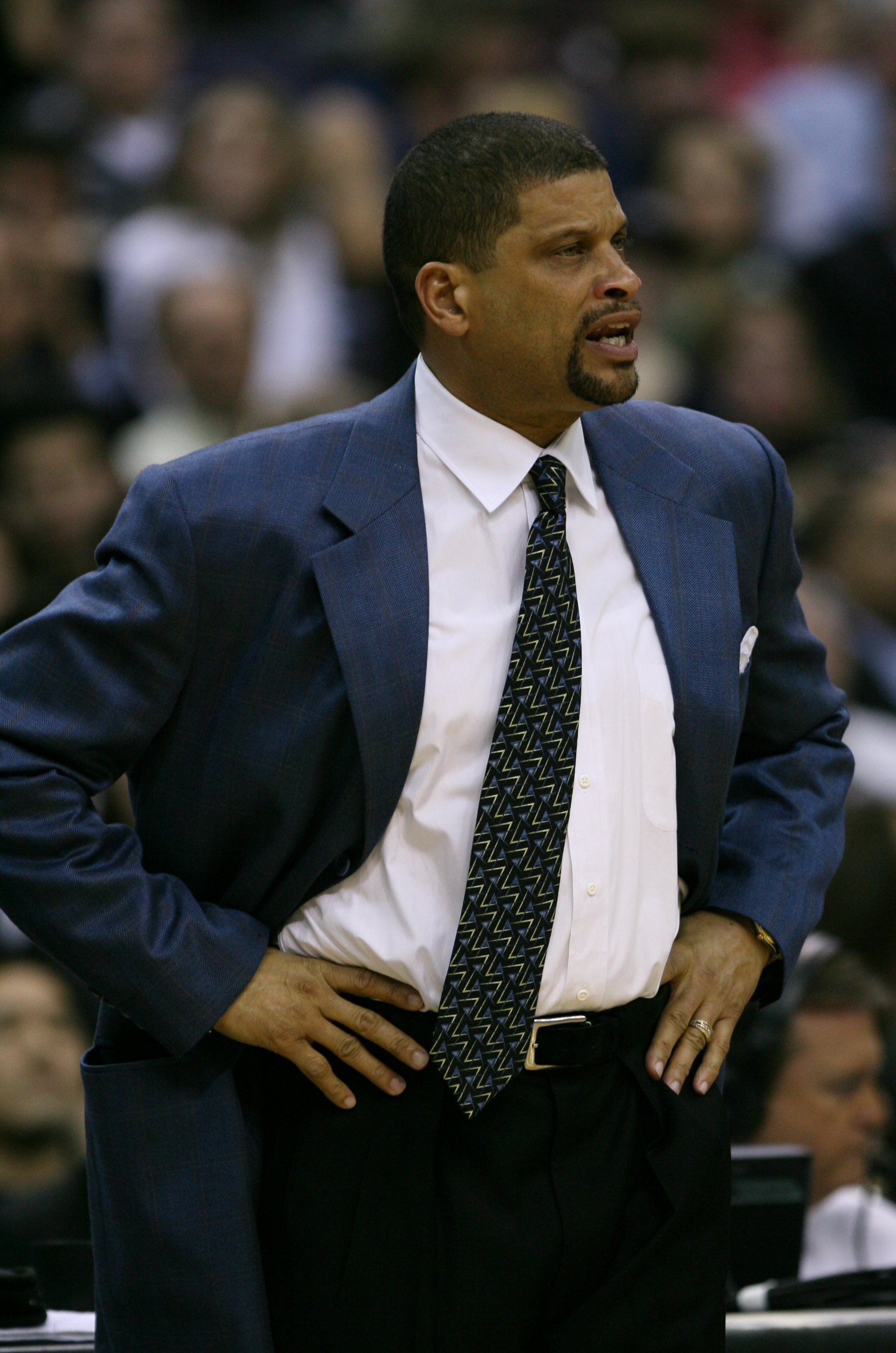
- Jordan in 2007

Personal information
- Born: January 29, 1955 (age 71) Washington, D.C., U.S.
- Listed height: 6 ft 1 in (1.85 m)
- Listed weight: 170 lb (77 kg)

Career information
- High school: Archbishop Carroll (Washington, D.C.)
- College: Rutgers (1973–1977)
- NBA draft: 1977: 2nd round, 33rd overall pick
- Drafted by: Cleveland Cavaliers
- Playing career: 1977–1984
- Position: Shooting guard
- Number: 30, 15, 5
- Coaching career: 1997–2018

Career history

Playing
- 1977: Cleveland Cavaliers
- 1977–1980: New Jersey Nets
- 1980–1983: Los Angeles Lakers
- 1983: Wyoming Wildcatters
- 1984: Portland Trail Blazers
- 1984: Los Angeles Lakers

Career highlights
- As player: NBA champion (1982); As coach: NBA All-Star Game head coach (2007)

Career NBA statistics
- Points: 3,414 (8.1 ppg)
- Rebounds: 788 (1.9 rpg)
- Assists: 1,595 (3.8 apg)
- Stats at NBA.com
- Stats at Basketball Reference

Edward Montgomery Jordan (born January 29, 1955) is an American former professional basketball player and coach. He formerly served as head coach of the Philadelphia 76ers, Washington Wizards, and Sacramento Kings in the National Basketball Association (NBA). He was also head coach for three seasons at Rutgers University.

== Basketball career ==
=== College career ===
Jordan attended Rutgers University from 1973 to 1977. He was enrolled as a physical education student, but did not earn his diploma until he was 60, after his NBA careers, while he was head coach of the Rutgers basketball team. Jordan helped lead the school to the 1976 NCAA Final Four, during which he was named East Regional MVP. At Rutgers, Jordan acquired the nickname "Fast Eddie." In his senior season, Jordan was named honorable mention All-America, while setting Rutgers' all-time career records in assists (585) and steals (220).

After he was named head coach of the basketball team, he graduated from Rutgers University in May 2015 with a Bachelor of Science degree in Labor and Employment Relations.

=== NBA career ===
==== Early NBA career ====
Jordan was selected by the Cleveland Cavaliers in the second round of the 1977 NBA draft (33rd overall), and was acquired by the New Jersey Nets halfway through his rookie season. Jordan tied Norm Nixon (Los Angeles Lakers) for the lead in total steals with 201 in 1978–1979, and was second in total steals, 223, in 1979–80 (behind the New York Knicks' Micheal Ray Richardson with 265).

==== Later NBA career ====
Jordan played for the Los Angeles Lakers during the 1980–81 season, and was a member of the 1982 NBA World Championship team. He played for the Lakers for four years and then played briefly with the Portland Trail Blazers. Jordan retired from the NBA after the 1983–84 season. Over his seven-year NBA career, Jordan averaged 8.1 points, 3.8 assists and 1.82 steals per game.

== Coaching career ==
=== NCAA ===
After retiring from the NBA in 1984, Jordan was a volunteer assistant at Rutgers University under his former college head coach, and his eventual Wizards' assistant, Tom Young. Jordan followed Young to Old Dominion University as a part-time assistant as before and subsequently obtained an assistant coaching position at Boston College under Jim O'Brien in 1986. He also became an assistant coach at Rutgers in 1988.

=== NBA ===
==== Kings ====
In 1992, Jordan became an assistant coach with the Sacramento Kings, and remained an assistant for five seasons. Jordan was promoted to head coach on March 20, 1997, during the final fifteen games of the 1996–97 regular season and remained the head coach during the 1997–98 season, during which he compiled a 33–64 record as the Kings' head coach. Jordan was fired after the 1997–98 season.

==== Nets ====
Jordan joined the New Jersey Nets coaching staff on March 17, 1999, and served as the lead assistant for four seasons. While in New Jersey, Jordan helped guide the squad to consecutive Atlantic Division and Eastern Conference Championships in 2002 and 2003.

==== Wizards ====
===== 2003–06 =====
Later that year, Jordan signed a four-year contract worth a little more than $3 million per year with the Washington Wizards and was introduced as head coach of the team on June 19, 2003.

Washington finished with a 25–57 record during Jordan's inaugural season as head coach. The following year, Jordan helped guide the Wizards to a 20-game improvement in 2004–05. Only the Chicago Bulls and Phoenix Suns experienced a greater improvement in total wins from the previous year.

On April 11, 2005, Jordan won his 100th career game as a head coach, and improved his career record to 103–158. During the 2004–05 regular season, Jordan's second with the Wizards, he led the team to a 45–37 record, which was the franchise's best season since 1978–79. The record established a new record for wins in a season at Verizon Center, earned the team a five seed in the Eastern Conference, and was the Wizards' first playoff berth since the 1996–97 season. The Wizards played the fourth seeded Chicago Bulls and won the series four games to two. The team rallied from a 0–2 deficit to win the series with four consecutive wins. It was the team's first postseason series win since 1982.

===== 2006–07 =====
In the 2006–07 season, Jordan guided the Wizards to a third straight playoff berth for the first time since 1988. Jordan won the Coach of the Month award for December, guiding Washington to a 12–4 record during that month. Jordan coached the Eastern Conference All-Stars at the NBA All-Star Game on February 18 in Las Vegas, the first coach from the franchise since Dick Motta in 1978–79.

===== 2007–08 =====
In the 2007–08 season Jordan led the Wizards to a fourth straight playoff berth despite beginning the year 0–5. The Wizards were eliminated in the first round by the Cleveland Cavaliers for the third straight year.

Jordan was fired as head coach of the Washington Wizards on November 24, 2008, after a 1–10 start. At the time of his firing Jordan was the longest tenured coach in the Eastern Conference and as their coach he guided the Wizards to four straight playoff appearances, advancing only once. He compiled a regular season record of 197–224. The 197 victories rank third all-time in franchise history.

==== 76ers ====
===== 2009–2010 =====
Jordan was officially introduced as the head coach of the Philadelphia 76ers on June 1, 2009.

On April 15, Jordan was fired by the 76ers after one season. Later that month, it was reported that Jordan had been one of the leading candidates for the head coaching vacancy at his alma mater, Rutgers, but had pulled out of the running to continue to seek a new coaching job in the NBA.

==== Lakers ====
In 2012, Jordan was hired as an assistant coach with the Los Angeles Lakers. Jordan was brought in primarily to assist head coach Mike Brown in installing the Princeton offense.

=== Rutgers ===
On April 18, 2013, it was reported that Rutgers would name Jordan head coach, replacing fired head coach Mike Rice. On April 23, 2013, Rutgers officially announced the hiring of Eddie Jordan as the 18th head coach of the men's basketball program.

In three years as coach of the Scarlet Knights, which included their transition from the American Athletic Conference to the Big Ten Conference, Jordan finished each season with twenty or more losses and the 2015–16 season was the worst of the three. Rutgers finished with twenty-five losses, sixteen of which were in conference; a victory against Minnesota in their final regular season game prevented the Scarlet Knights from finishing winless in Big Ten play and broke a thirty-two game conference losing streak. Jordan's final game was on March 9, 2016, as the Scarlet Knights lost to Nebraska in the opening round of the Big Ten tournament; Rutgers announced his firing the next day. His overall record was 29–68, with an 8–46 record on conference play.

== Career player statistics ==
Legend
GP	Games played	GS	Games started	MPG	Minutes per game
FG%	Field goal percentage	3P%	3-point field goal percentage	FT%	Free throw percentage
RPG	Rebounds per game	APG	Assists per game	SPG	Steals per game
BPG	Blocks per game	PPG	Points per game	**Bold**	Career high
†	Won an NBA championship	*	Led the league

=== NBA ===
==== Regular season ====
Year	Team	GP	GS	MPG	FG%	3P%	FT%	RPG	APG	SPG	BPG	PPG
1977–78	Cleveland	22		7.8	.339		.750	.5	1.5	.2	.0	2.3
1977–78	New Jersey	51		20.4	.407		.788	2.1	2.8	2.2	.4	10.0
1978–79	New Jersey	**82***		27.6	.418		.777	2.6	4.5	2.5	**.5**	12.4
1979–80	New Jersey	**82**	**82**	**32.4**	.430	.250	.779	**3.3**	**6.8**	**2.7**	.3	**13.3**
1980–81	New Jersey	14		17.1	.411	**.300**	.750	1.3	3.3	1.7	.1	6.2
1980–81	L.A. Lakers	60		16.5	.430	.250	.663	1.3	3.3	1.2	.1	5.1
1981–82†	L.A. Lakers	58	0	10.5	.428	.111	**.796**	.7	2.3	1.1	.0	3.8
1982–83	L.A. Lakers	35	0	9.5	.303	.188	.647	.7	2.3	.9	.0	2.7
1983–84	Portland	13	0	14.1	.317	.000	.700	1.0	3.0	1.6	.0	2.5
1983–84	L.A. Lakers	3	0	9.0	**.500**	–	.500	1.3	1.7	1.3	.0	3.0
Career		420	82	20.3	.414	.224	.763	1.9	3.8	1.8	.2	8.1

==== Playoffs ====
Year	Team	GP	MPG	FG%	3P%	FT%	RPG	APG	SPG	BPG	PPG
1979	New Jersey	2	**41.5**	**.395**		**.889**	**7.5**	**8.5**	**4.0**	**1.5**	**19.0**
1981	L.A. Lakers	2	2.0	–	–	–	.0	.5	.0	.0	.0
1982†	L.A. Lakers	**3**	2.0	.000	.000	–	.0	1.7	.7	.0	.0
Career		7	13.3	.375	.000	.889	2.1	3.3	1.4	.4	5.4

== Head coaching record ==
=== NBA ===
Legend
Regular season	G	Games coached	W	Games won	L	Games lost	W–L %	Win–loss %
Playoffs	PG	Playoff games	PW	Playoff wins	PL	Playoff losses	PW–L %	Playoff win–loss %

Team	Year	G	W	L	W–L%	Finish	PG	PW	PL	PW–L%	Result
Sacramento	1996–97	15	6	9	.400	6th in Pacific	—	—	—	—	Missed Playoffs
Sacramento	1997–98	82	27	55	.329	5th in Pacific	—	—	—	—	Missed Playoffs
Washington	2003–04	82	25	57	.305	6th in Atlantic	—	—	—	—	Missed Playoffs
Washington	2004–05	82	45	37	.549	2nd in Southeast	10	4	6	.400	Lost in Conf. Semifinals
Washington	2005–06	82	42	40	.512	2nd in Southeast	6	2	4	.333	Lost in First Round
Washington	2006–07	82	41	41	.500	2nd in Southeast	4	0	4	.000	Lost in First Round
Washington	2007–08	82	43	39	.524	2nd in Southeast	6	2	4	.333	Lost in First Round
Washington	2008–09	11	1	10	.091	(fired)	—	—	—	—	—
Philadelphia	2009–10	82	27	55	.329	4th in Atlantic	—	—	—	—	Missed Playoffs
Career		600	257	343	.428		26	8	18	.308	

=== College ===
Record table
Season	Team	Overall	Conference	Standing	Postseason
Rutgers Scarlet Knights (American Athletic Conference) (2013–2014)
2013–14	Rutgers	12–21	5–13	7th	
Rutgers Scarlet Knights (Big Ten Conference) (2014–2016)
2014–15	Rutgers	10–22	2–16	14th	
2015–16	Rutgers	7–25	1–17	14th	
Rutgers:		29–68 (.299)	8–46 (.148)		
Total:		29–68 (.299)			

== See also ==
- List of National Basketball Association players with most steals in a game
