= Gilbert Arenas =

American basketball player (born 1982)

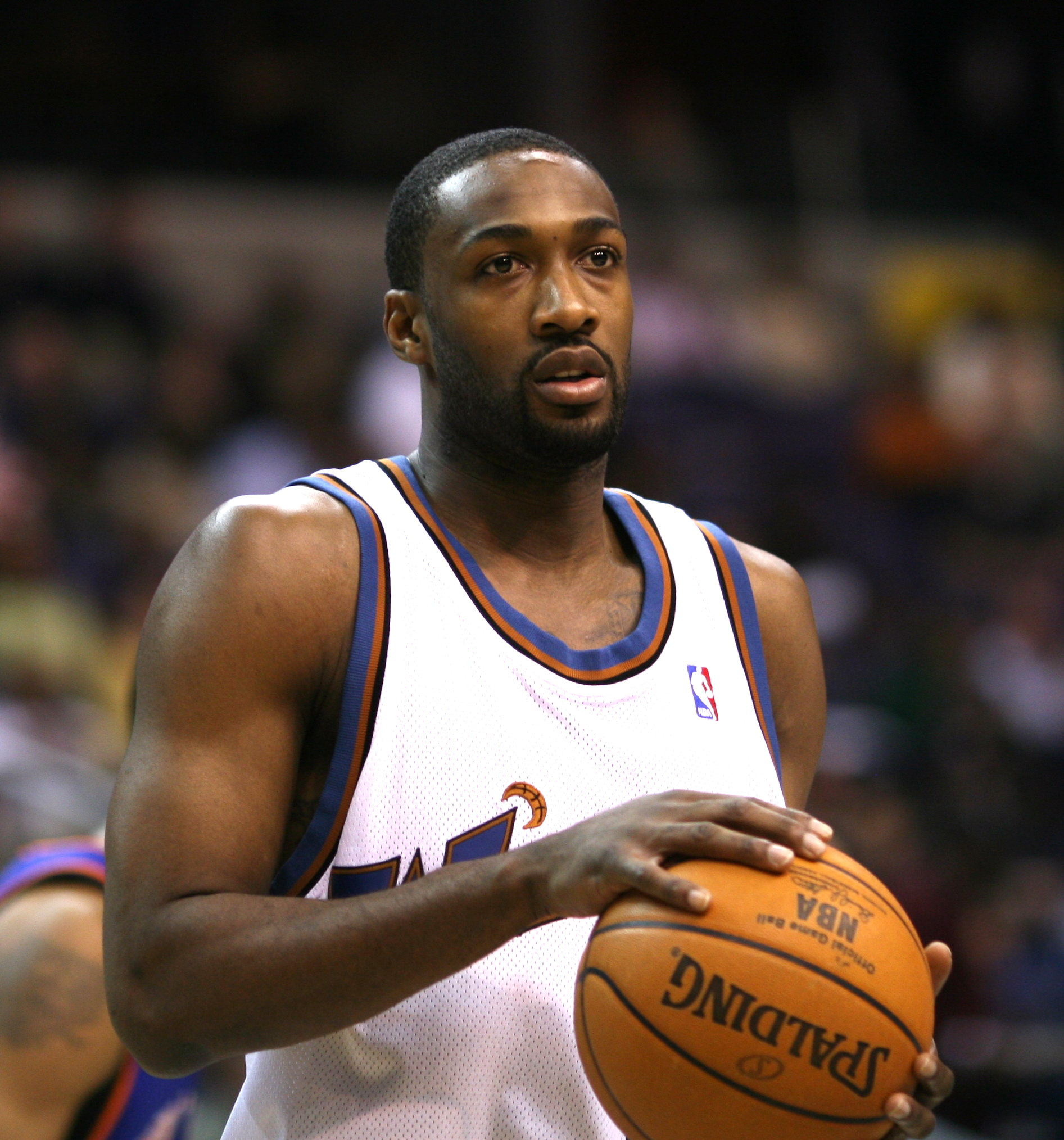
- Arenas with the Washington Wizards in 2008

Personal information
- Born: January 6, 1982 (age 44) Tampa, Florida, U.S.
- Listed height: 6 ft 4 in (1.93 m)
- Listed weight: 215 lb (98 kg)

Career information
- High school: Grant (Los Angeles, California)
- College: Arizona (1999–2001)
- NBA draft: 2001: 2nd round, 31st overall pick
- Drafted by: Golden State Warriors
- Playing career: 2001–2013
- Position: Point guard / shooting guard
- Number: 0, 9, 1, 10

Career history
- 2001–2003: Golden State Warriors
- 2003–2010: Washington Wizards
- 2010–2011: Orlando Magic
- 2012: Memphis Grizzlies
- 2012–2013: Shanghai Sharks

Career highlights
- 3× NBA All-Star (2005–2007); All-NBA Second Team (2007); 2× All-NBA Third Team (2005, 2006); NBA Most Improved Player (2003); First-team All-Pac-10 (2001); Pac-10 All-Freshman Team (2000)

Career statistics
- Points: 11,402 (20.7 ppg)
- Rebounds: 2,168 (3.9 rpg)
- Assists: 2,909 (5.3 apg)
- Stats at NBA.com
- Stats at Basketball Reference

Gilbert Jay Arenas Jr. (/əˈriːnəz/ ə-REE-nəz; born January 6, 1982) is an American former professional basketball player. Arenas attended Grant High School in the Valley Glen district of Los Angeles, and accepted a scholarship offer to the University of Arizona late in his junior year. He was drafted by the Golden State Warriors with the 31st overall pick in the 2001 NBA draft.

Arenas was a three-time NBA All-Star, three-time member of the All-NBA Team during his time in Washington, and was voted the NBA Most Improved Player in the 2002–03 season in his final season in Golden State. Arenas was nicknamed "Agent Zero" while playing with Washington, due to his jersey number (0). He was also nicknamed "Hibachi" for "cooking" his opponents. This nickname also referred to his ability to "heat up" quickly. Both names quickly became fan favorites during his time in the Washington, D.C. area. Arenas played the point guard and shooting guard positions.

Arenas was suspended for most of the 2009–10 NBA season because of handgun violations stemming from an incident on December 24, 2009, and for subsequent actions that appeared to make light of the incident.

In late 2010, Arenas was traded to the Orlando Magic. After the 2011 NBA lockout, Arenas was the first NBA player to be waived under the "amnesty clause". He signed with the Memphis Grizzlies for the 2011–12 NBA season, which would be his final season in the league.

== Early life ==
Gilbert Arenas was born in Tampa, Florida, to parents Gilbert Arenas Sr. and Mary Francis Robinson. His paternal grandfather Hipolito Arenas Sr., was a first-generation Cuban American and also an American Negro League baseball player. Arenas was raised in the San Fernando Valley section of Los Angeles where he played basketball at Ulysses S. Grant High School. His number, #25, was retired by the school. Arenas was a late bloomer, taking the final spot on the national ranking as the 99th in the class of 1999. He averaged 36.5 ppg 7.5 rebounds and 4.1 steals his senior year. Before beginning his freshman year at the University of Arizona, Arenas attended Michael Jordan's basketball camp and was chosen to play on Jordan's team during a game. He impressed Jordan by scoring eight baskets in his first eight possessions. Following the camp, Jordan told coach Lute Olson that Arenas deserved time on the court. Rodney Tention recruited Arenas to Arizona during a Summer AAU game.

== College career ==
Arenas played basketball at the University of Arizona. He was 17 years old during his freshman season at Arizona, where he played 34 games, starting 31 of them and averaging 15.4 PPG and 4.1 RPG playing both shooting guard and point guard. One of his teammates, Richard Jefferson, would later join him in entering the 2001 NBA draft. In 2001, Arenas' sophomore year, he was named first-team All-Pac-10. He helped lead Arizona to the national championship game, where they lost to the Duke Blue Devils, 82–72. Arenas, who was reportedly dealing with a knee injury, struggled in the championship game. He scored 10 points, grabbing 4 rebounds and dishing 4 assists, shooting 4–17 from the field and 0–4 from 3, in what would be his final game with Arizona. Shortly after the tournament, Arenas announced that he was foregoing his last two years at college and would enter the 2001 NBA draft. NBA scouts thought that Arenas, at the time aged only 19, was Arizona's best pro prospect.

== Professional career ==
=== Golden State Warriors (2001–2003) ===
After a productive college career, Arenas entered the 2001 NBA draft. Despite strong consideration from many teams in the first round and even lottery teams such as the Boston Celtics, Golden State Warriors, and Sacramento Kings, Arenas fell to the second round in part due to his effort in interviews despite strong performances in workouts and scrimmages, being selected with the first pick of the second round (31st overall) by the Golden State Warriors. Arenas stated, "I had my 2-day pre-Draft workout with Celtics. Killed the first one, I skipped the 2nd to heal my Achilles so I can tryout with other teams. Celtic's Jim O'Brien put out the rumor that I was immature, didn't take it seriously. Once I was labelled that I was done as a 1st rounder." While slipping through the draft, Arenas contacted Rodney Tention, who was responsible for recruiting him to Arizona to see if he could return to school. Arenas was shocked teammate Richard Jefferson was selected ahead of him despite Jefferson mocked commonly in the top 10 to the late lottery. Arenas would wear the number 0 on his jersey to signify the number of minutes that experts predicted he would play coming as a 17 year old low end prospect from a small high school going to a college powerhouse in Arizona.

Arenas made his NBA debut on November 4, 2001, vs the Portland Trail Blazers. After not playing his first 3 games, Arenas went scoreless. Arenas scored his first point a free throw in a game vs the Toronto Raptors on November 7, 2001. Arenas made his first field goal on January 16, 2002, in a game vs the Cleveland Cavaliers scoring 7 points and going 3–4 from the field. Arenas made his first career start on February 15, 2002, and on February 17, 2002, vs the Atlanta Hawks, Arenas had his first double digit scoring game with 12 points; he continued the streak to 9 games with one double double in that stretch. Arenas started 30 games and averaged 10.9 points per game for the Warriors, who finished in last place in the Western Conference that season. Arenas was often forced to sleep at the Warriors' arena due to lavish spending of his rookie money and signing bonus. He later stated the time at the arena allowed him to focus on his game and become a better player.

In 2002–03, his sophomore season, Arenas received the NBA Most Improved Player Award averaging 18.3 points, 6.3 assists and 4.7 rebounds as Golden State improved its victory total to 38, up from 21 last season with Arenas leading the charge, and was named Most Valuable Player of the Rookie-Sophomore game during the NBA All-Star Weekend. Arenas had a 33 game stretch where he averaged 23.4 PPG, 5.7 APG, and 4.7 RPG with 1.5 SPG on 46.7% FG and 37.7% from 3. Arenas had one of the best performances of his career during March 2003, when he dropped 41 points, grabbed six rebounds and dished five assists in a win against the Wizards which would be the team that made him their franchise player after the Warriors were unable to match. Arenas said after he won the Most Improved Player award that he didn't think there was much to improve, and he had only needed more playing time and more experience.

=== Washington Wizards (2003–2010) ===
==== 2003–04 season ====
After the 2002–03 season, Arenas became a restricted free agent. He reportedly flipped a coin to decide among several teams seeking to sign him, including the Wizards, Warriors, and Clippers. The Washington Wizards offered him a six-year, $60 million contract making him the face of the franchise after just turning 21 years old. The Warriors were unable to match this offer because they were over the salary cap and because Arenas was a second-round pick. If Arenas had been drafted in the first round, the salary cap had exceptions that would have allowed the Warriors to match the offer sheet. The "Gilbert Arenas Rule" was later created to allow teams to re-sign restricted free agents who were not first-round picks. Arenas battled a strained abdominal muscle injury all season which would cause him to have only to start 52 games in his first year in Washington and constantly sitting on the sidelines dropped his shooting percentage instead of breaking out into the franchise cornerstones in his first year Washington envisioned, Arenas still led the team in PPG and APG.

==== 2004–05 season ====
With Arenas being healthy, he teamed up with former teammate guard Larry Hughes (22.0 points per game) in 2004–05 to give the Wizards the highest-scoring backcourt duo in the NBA. Arenas was selected for his first NBA All-Star Game. He guided the team to a 45-win season and its first playoff berth since 1997. Arenas led the team in scoring with 25.5 ppg, finishing seventh in the league in that category. He also finished sixth in the league in steals per game in 2004–05 with 2.24 (Hughes led the league with 2.93 steals per game).

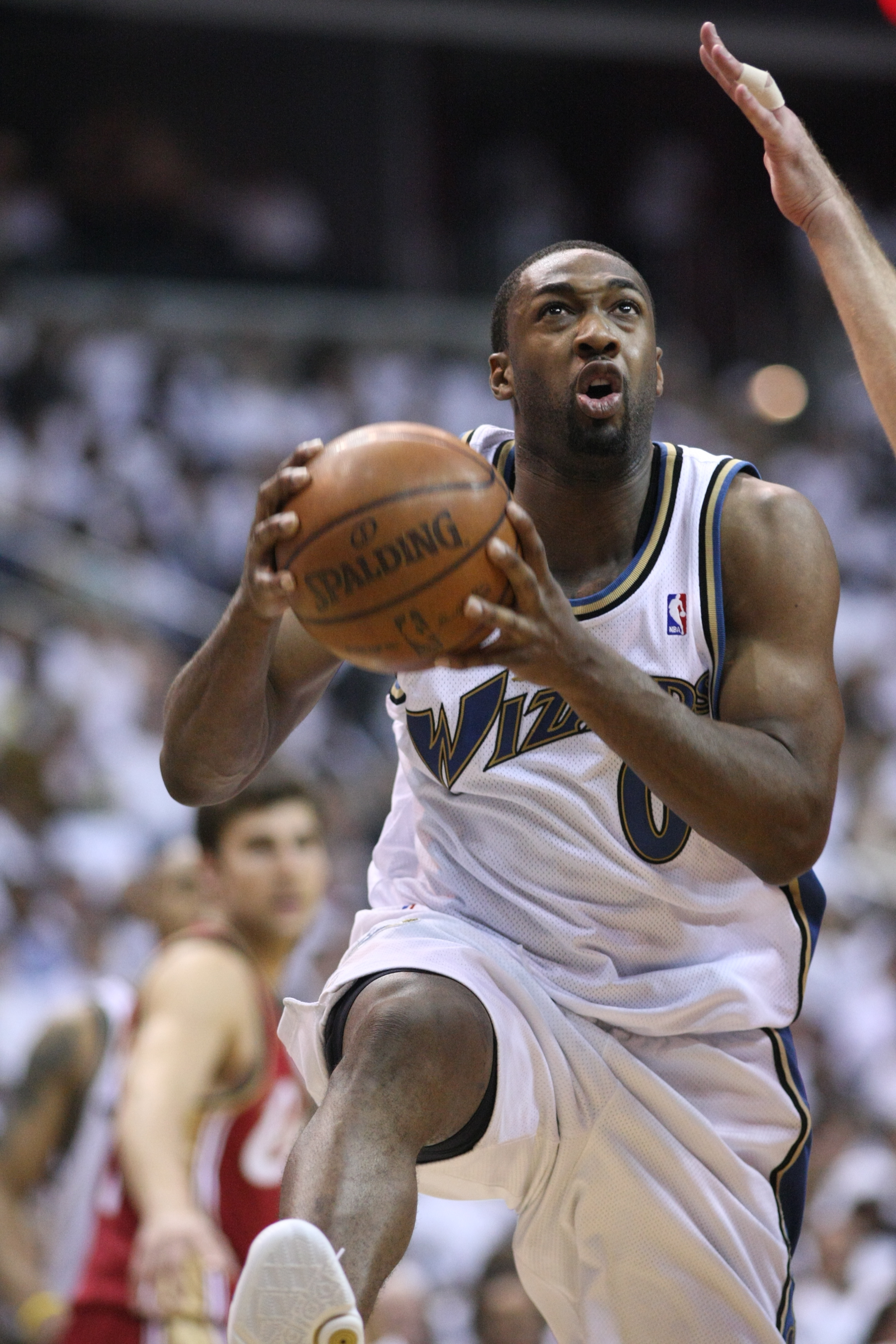
Arenas during his tenure with the Washington Wizards

In the fifth game of the first round of the Eastern Conference playoffs in 2005, Arenas hit a 16-foot fadeaway as time expired to give the Wizards a 112–110 win over the Chicago Bulls. The Wizards eventually won the series, the franchise's first playoff series victory in more than two decades. In the second round, the Wizards were swept by the Miami Heat, who had been the #1 seed in the Eastern Conference.

==== 2005–06 season ====
In 2006, Wizards fansite Wizznutzz.com jokingly nicknamed him "Agent Zero", a nickname Arenas liked so much that it stuck.

Arenas averaged 29.3 points, which ranked fourth among the scoring leaders, two steals (also fourth), and 6.1 assists per game during the 2005–06 NBA season. However, he was not initially chosen for the 2006 All-Star Game. He was named as a replacement after Indiana Pacers forward–center Jermaine O'Neal was injured. He also participated in the Three-point Shootout, where he placed second, after Dirk Nowitzki. The Washington Wizards finished 42–40 and earned the fifth seed in the Eastern Conference.

During the off-season, Arenas said that he was willing to take a pay cut in order to give the Wizards additional money with which to sign available free agents. He had expressed a desire to win a championship with the Wizards. One of Arenas' most memorable plays was a 40-foot jump shot in Round 1 of the 2006 NBA playoffs in which the Wizards were eliminated by the LeBron James-led Cleveland Cavaliers in six games.

==== 2006–07 season ====
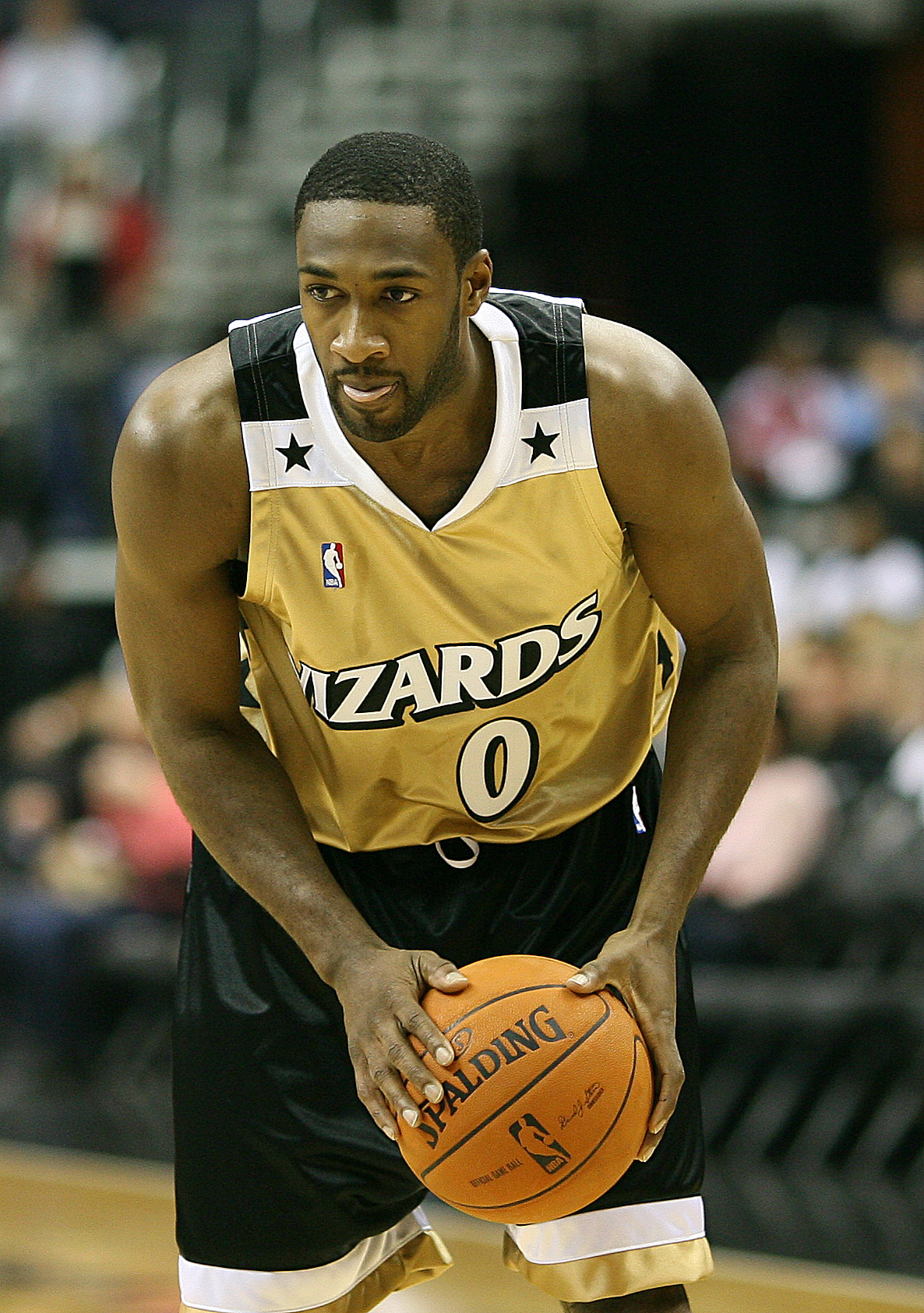
Arenas (pictured November 2006) in the Wizards gold alternate jersey, also worn in the 60 point game vs. the Los Angeles Lakers a month later

Arenas himself has noted that he withdrew from the United States national team for the 2006 FIBA World Championship because he felt that assistant coaches Mike D'Antoni and Nate McMillan had determined the roster even prior to tryouts. Afterward, he stated that he planned on averaging 50 points against their respective teams (Phoenix Suns and Portland Trail Blazers). He succeeded at his goal versus powerhouse Phoenix, scoring 54 points, including 21-of-37 from the field, 6-of-12 three-pointers (while reportedly eyeing in the direction of Suns chairman Jerry Colangelo), in a high-scoring 144–139 Wizards win over the Suns. However, on February 11 versus the Blazers, he was held to a lowly nine points, including tying the Wizards' franchise record for three-point futility, going 0-for-8 from behind the arc, in a 94–73 loss versus Portland.

In an overtime game versus the Los Angeles Lakers on December 17, 2006, at the Staples Center in Los Angeles, Arenas scored a career-high 60 points, adding 8 rebounds and 8 assists in helping lead the Wizards over the Lakers, 147–141. Arenas holds the Wizards' franchise record for points scored in a game by an individual, a record he now shares with Bradley Beal. The previous record of 56 points was held by Earl Monroe, achieved in 1968, which was also an overtime game against the Lakers. Arenas' 16 points in the extra period also set an NBA record for most points in one overtime period, surpassing Earl Boykins' record by one point.

On January 3, 2007, Arenas hit a 32-foot buzzer-beater to win the game against the Milwaukee Bucks, 108–105. Two weeks later on Martin Luther King Jr. Day he hit another buzzer-beating three-pointer to beat the Utah Jazz, 114–111, in a thriller at the Verizon Center. This same scenario has been added as a cut scene in the video game NBA Live 2008. He also hit a game-winning layup as time expired to beat the Seattle SuperSonics on March 21, 2007.

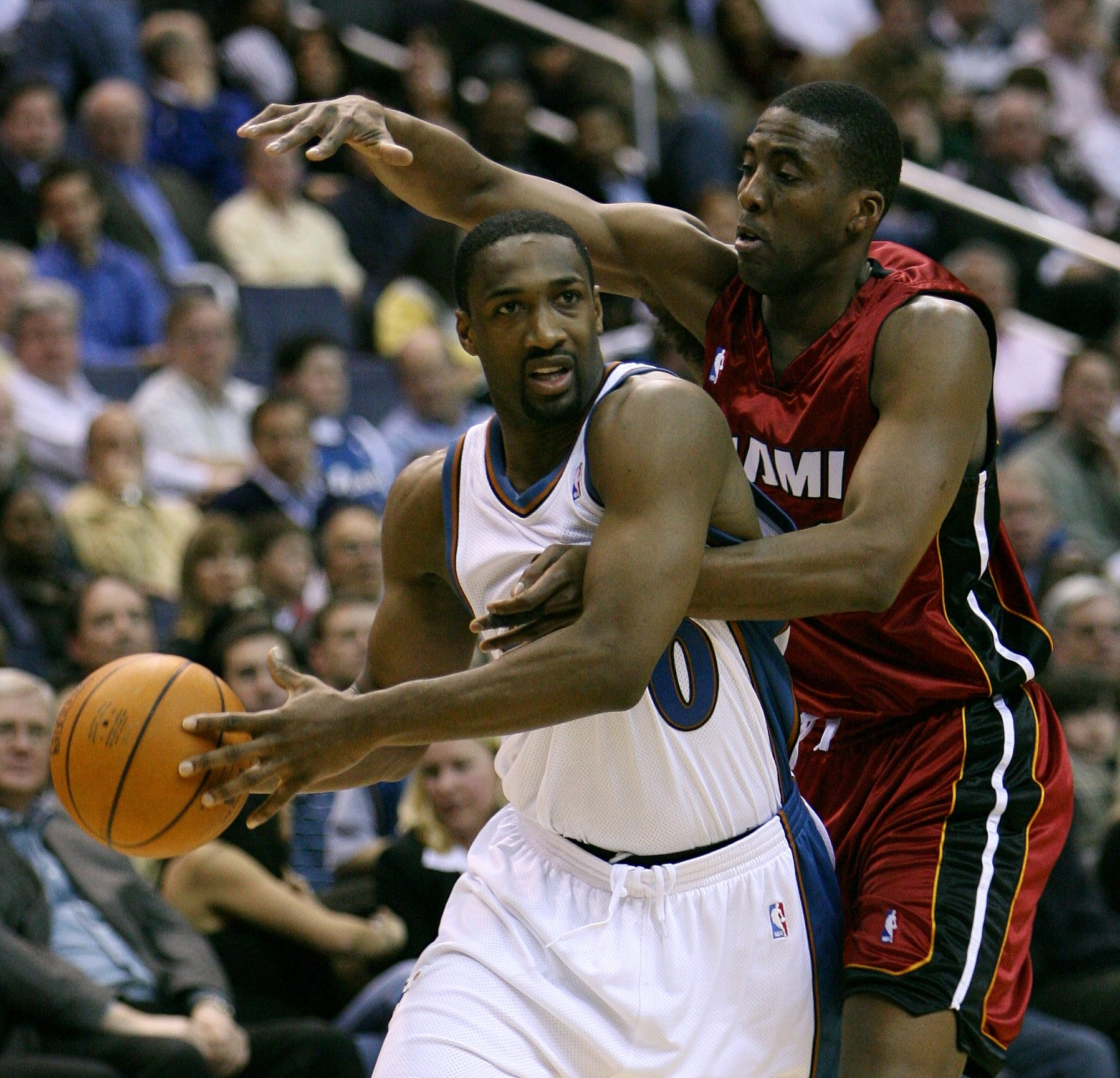
Arenas (left) in 2007

In February 2007, during the final days of All-Star voting, Arenas was voted as a first-time starter for the 2007 NBA All-Star game for the Eastern Conference, edging out Vince Carter by a slight margin, with 1,454,166 votes to Carter's 1,451,156. At the time he was averaging 29.7 points per game, and led all Eastern Conference point guards in scoring and was second in the league.

Towards the end of the season, Arenas tore his MCL during a game against the Charlotte Bobcats, when Gerald Wallace fell into his leg. The Wizards struggled to finish the season with Arenas and teammate Caron Butler both being injured. Washington earned a playoff berth, but was swept in the first round in a rematch with the Cleveland Cavaliers. This was the last season Arenas made an All-Star game and All-NBA team before constant injuries and off-court issues.

==== 2007–08 season ====
During the off-season, Arenas told The Washington Post that he would opt out of his contract after the 2007–08 season, making him a free agent. He stated, "if something happens where they don't want me or they're going in a different direction, I can look elsewhere. But my intentions are not to leave."

Arenas only played eight games during the 2007–08 season, due to a knee injury, before he started practicing again in March, and returned to action on April 2, 2008, against the Milwaukee Bucks, scoring 17 points in a 110–109 home loss.

Ten days prior, Arenas stormed out of the locker room before a game against the Detroit Pistons. He had wanted to play, but his doctor did not give him clearance. Arenas made a surprise return on April 9, when he came out of the locker room with 5:30 left in the first quarter. He finished the game scoring 13 points and dishing out 3 assists in helping the Wizards beat the Boston Celtics, 109–95. He came off the bench for the rest of the regular season as not to disrupt the chemistry the Wizards had built without him. Arenas got his wish when they matched up against the Cavaliers for the third straight year; however, it was apparent he was not 100% healthy. In games 1–3, he played limited minutes, citing soreness in his surgically repaired knee. A few minutes before game 4 of their first-round playoff appearance against the Cavaliers, Arenas announced he would sit out the rest of the playoffs.

==== 2008–09 season ====
On June 9, 2008, Arenas officially opted out of the final year of his contract, but said that he would re-sign with the Wizards if they retained teammate Antawn Jamison, also a free agent. The Wizards did indeed sign Jamison to a contract. Arenas was offered a five-year contract worth more than $100 million by the Golden State Warriors and another max deal by the Wizards, a six-year deal worth $124 million. Arenas was teammates with Jamison during their time in Golden State.

On July 13, 2008, Arenas signed a six-year contract worth $111 million with the Wizards.

Due to the lingering injuries from April 2007, Arenas would not make his season debut until March 28, 2009, scoring 15 points and dishing 10 assists in a 98–96 loss to the Detroit Pistons.

He also played a second and final game against the number one seed Cleveland Cavaliers on April 2, in which both teams wore their respective throwback jerseys. Arenas dished out 10 assists and scored 11 points, in a win, and fans were excited to see Arenas, Brendan Haywood, Antawn Jamison, and Caron Butler re-uniting for the only time in the season. However, the Wizards finished poorly with a record of 19–63, the second-worst record in the NBA, tied with the Los Angeles Clippers, ending four years of consecutive playoff appearances.

==== 2009–10 season ====
Arenas opened the 2009–10 season on a hopeful note, scoring 29 points as the Wizards beat the Dallas Mavericks 102–91 in their season opener. However, Arenas' performance would be inconsistent in the weeks ahead; on November 11, he set a Wizards team record for turnovers in a game with 12. On December 12, Arenas netted his first triple-double in 5 1/2 years in a loss to the Pacers. Six days later Arenas had a season-best 45 points in a Wizards win over his former team, the Golden State Warriors.

==== Firearms incident ====
On December 24, 2009, it was reported that Arenas had admitted to storing unloaded firearms in his locker at the Verizon Center and had surrendered them to team security. In doing so, Arenas not only violated NBA rules against bringing firearms into an arena, but also violated D.C. ordinances as well. On January 1, 2010, it was also reported that Arenas and teammate Javaris Crittenton had drawn guns on each other in the Wizards' locker room during a Christmas Eve argument regarding gambling debts. The D.C. Metropolitan Police and the U.S. Attorney's office began investigating, and on January 14, 2010, Arenas was charged with carrying a pistol without a license, a violation of Washington, D.C.'s gun-control laws. Arenas pleaded guilty on January 15 to the felony of carrying an unlicensed pistol outside a home or business.

On January 6, 2010, Arenas' 28th birthday, the NBA suspended him indefinitely without pay until its investigation was complete. By nearly all accounts, the league felt compelled to act when Arenas' teammates surrounded him during pregame introductions prior to a game with the Philadelphia 76ers, and he pretended to shoot them with guns made from his fingers. NBA Commissioner David Stern said in a statement that Arenas' behavior after the investigation started "has led me to conclude that he is not currently fit to take the court in an NBA game." He also said that Arenas was likely facing a lengthy suspension. The Wizards issued a statement of their own condemning the players' pregame stunt as "unacceptable". On January 27, 2010, Arenas and Crittenton were suspended for the rest of the season, after meeting with Stern. On February 2, 2010, Arenas wrote an open editorial in The Washington Post, in which he apologized for his actions, particularly for failing to be a better role model to young fans and for "making light of a serious situation." On March 26, 2010, Arenas was convicted for his crimes and was sentenced to two years' probation and 30 days in a halfway house. Arenas started his sentence in the halfway house on April 9. He was released on May 7. The punishment for Arenas was significantly stiffer than for Crittenton, who received a year of unsupervised probation.

Upon his return to the Wizards for the 2010–11 season, Arenas elected to change his number from 0 to 9, claiming he was trying to put the entire incident from the previous season behind him. (Arenas had worn #0 all the way from college through his time in the NBA as a constant reminder of the number of minutes his critics said he would play in the NBA.)

After the first 24 games of the season, Arenas led the Wizards with an average of 17.3 points per game but the team had one of the worst win-loss records in the league at 6–18.

=== Orlando Magic (2010–2011) ===
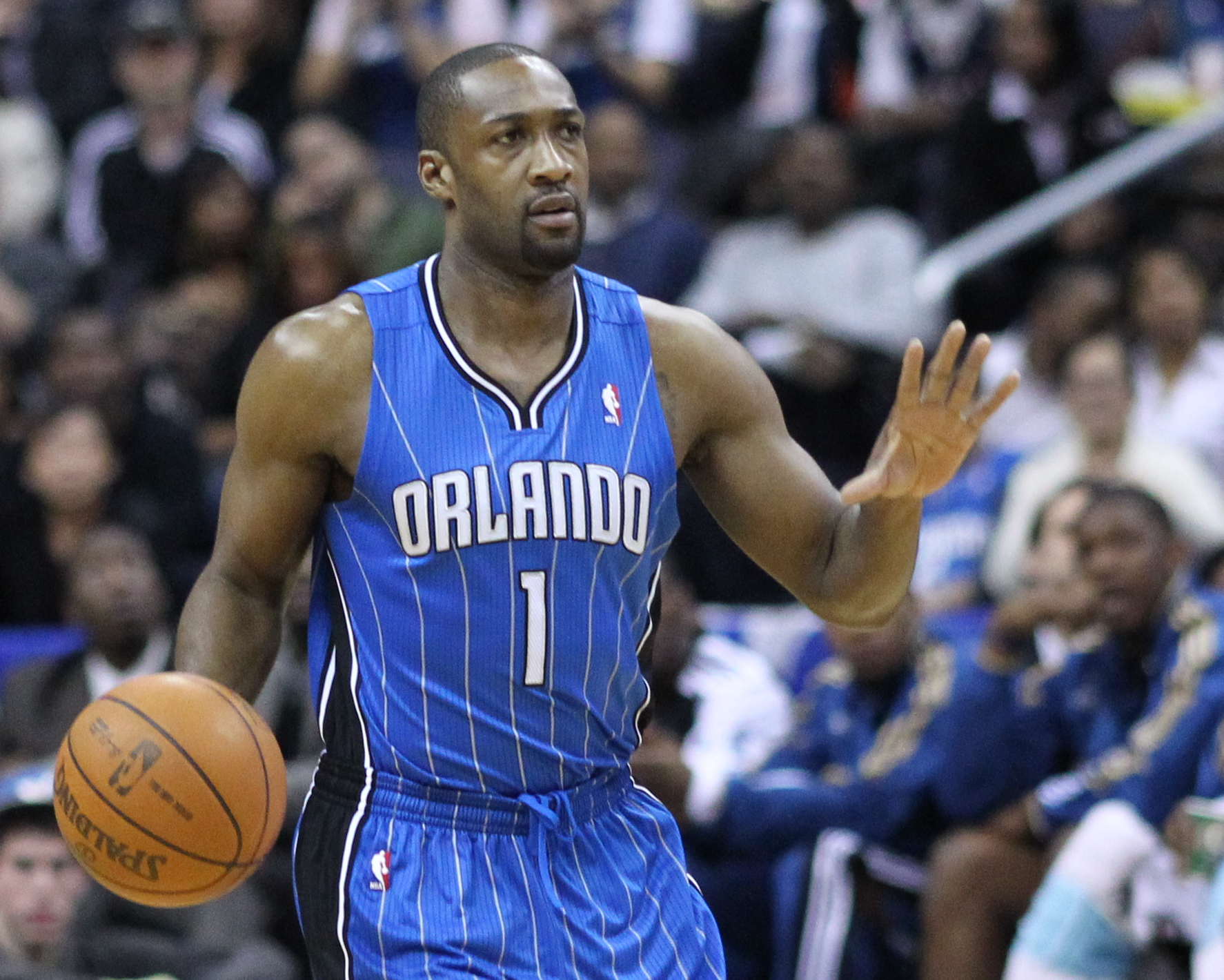
Arenas with the Magic in 2010

On December 18, 2010, Arenas was traded to the Orlando Magic for Rashard Lewis. Arenas was reunited with former Warriors teammate and draftmate Jason Richardson in Orlando. Arenas chose to wear #1 on his jersey in honor of his favorite player, Penny Hardaway. He was the backup point guard, with Jameer Nelson at the starting role. The Magic finished 52–30 and clinched the fourth seed in the Eastern Conference and made the playoffs. However, Orlando lost to the Atlanta Hawks in six games in the opening round of the playoffs.

On December 9, 2011, after the end of the 2011 NBA lockout, Arenas was waived by the Orlando Magic under the amnesty clause, being the first player to be waived under the newly established clause at the time of its inclusion. He cleared waivers and became a free agent. Due to the 2011 NBA lockout, the 2011–12 NBA season was reduced from its normal 82 games to 66 games.

In the summer of 2011, Arenas acted with former Wizards teammate Etan Thomas in a dramatic production of Our Town by Thornton Wilder.

=== Memphis Grizzlies (2012) ===
On March 20, 2012, the Memphis Grizzlies signed Arenas. His primary role was again a backup point guard, this time to Mike Conley Jr. The Grizzlies finished 41–25 and clinched the fourth seed in the Western Conference. However, they lost in the first round to the Los Angeles Clippers in a full seven-game series. Arenas' final NBA game was played in seventh and deciding game of the 2012 Western Conference First Round on May 13, 2012. Memphis lost to the Los Angeles Clippers, with Arenas only playing for 3 minutes and recording no stats; Arenas was only 30 years old in his final NBA game.

=== Shanghai Sharks (2012–2013) ===
On November 19, 2012, Arenas signed with the Shanghai Sharks of the Chinese Basketball Association (CBA). In his one season in the CBA, Arenas averaged 20.7 points per game, 7.3 rebounds per game, and 3.0 assists per game in 27.3 minutes per game. He played in 14 games and started in 8 of them. However, the Sharks finished at 10–22 and missed the playoffs.

== Broadcasting career ==
Arenas hosted a daily sports show on Complex News' YouTube channel. He also has his own No Chill Productions podcast, The No Chill Podcast. In 2023, he launched another podcast called Gil's Arena in partnership with Underdog Fantasy Sports which he hosted with Josiah Johnson and featured former NBA and WNBA players such as Brandon Jennings, Rashad McCants, Kenyon Martin, Lexie Brown, Sheryl Swoopes, and Nick Young with Norris Cole being a frequent guest on the show. In 2024, Arenas was a regular co-host alongside Chad Johnson on Shannon Sharpe's podcast, Nightcap. Arenas has had a show and created content with Fubo Tv for many years. In August 2025, it was announced that Arenas would be a host on an Underdog Fantasy Sports podcast "The Arena: Gridiron" alongside Skip Bayless, Jay Gruden, and Aqib Talib. After splitting from Underdog Fantasy Sports and selling 50% of the Gil's Arena show, Arenas would sign a new partnership deal with Playmaker in July 2026 to relaunch Gil's Arena with new episodes starting in August.

== Personal life ==
Arenas has four children with Laura Govan, whom he dated from 2002 until 2014. Arenas met Govan while he was playing for the Warriors. Govan worked with the Sacramento Kings' public relations department. Arenas' son Alijah is a 5 star prospect in the class of 2025, who committed to play for the USC Trojans. His daughter Izela Arenas is the 88th ranked prospect in the class of 2024 and is committed to Louisville. In July 2024, Arenas announced his engagement to French social media influencer Melli Monaco. Arenas and Monaco married on January 20, 2025.

One of Arenas' cousins is Javier Arenas, a professional football player who played for the NFL's Buffalo Bills. Another cousin, Armando Murillo, has played in the Canadian Football League.

Arenas is a friend of rapper the Game and was listed in the booklet for the Game's second album Doctor's Advocate.

He collects a synthetic basketball from each team played, as well as players' jerseys, of which he has more than 400, most of which are autographed. He supported PETA's anti-fur mission by posing shirtless for their Ink, Not Mink campaign.

Arenas donated $100 for every point he scored in each home game during the 2006–07 season to local D.C.-area schools, while Wizards team owner Abe Pollin matched that contribution for each away game. He has also mentored a D.C. boy who lost his family in a fire at age 10. Arenas got him a job as a ball boy for the Wizards.

Arenas has had his own shoe, the Adidas Gil Zero, as well as his own line of Adidas TS Lightswitch shoes. Arenas wears size 14 1/2 shoes. Following the gun incident in 2009, Adidas dropped their sponsorship of Arenas. Instead of signing another endorsement deal, he turned to his vast collection of shoes. For nearly every game of the season, Arenas wore a different pair of shoes, wearing a total of 77 different pairs.

Arenas admitted that he ran about 60 red lights in 4 months and got away with it by keeping his dealer plates on his vehicle.

== Legal issues ==
On June 27, 2013, Arenas was arrested by the LAPD for the possession of illegal fireworks.

On July 30, 2025, Arenas was arrested after being indicted on a federal charge of running an illegal underground high stakes gambling operation.

== Career statistics ==
Legend
GP	Games played	GS	Games started	MPG	Minutes per game
FG%	Field goal percentage	3P%	3-point field goal percentage	FT%	Free throw percentage
RPG	Rebounds per game	APG	Assists per game	SPG	Steals per game
BPG	Blocks per game	PPG	Points per game	**Bold**	Career high
*	Led the league

=== Regular season ===
Year	Team	GP	GS	MPG	FG%	3P%	FT%	RPG	APG	SPG	BPG	PPG
2001–02	Golden State	47	30	24.6	**.453**	.345	.775	2.8	3.7	1.5	.2	10.9
2002–03	Golden State	**82**	**82***	35.0	.431	.348	.791	**4.7**	6.3	1.5	.2	18.3
2003–04	Washington	55	52	37.6	.392	**.375**	.748	4.6	5.0	1.9	.2	19.6
2004–05	Washington	80	80	40.9	.431	.365	.814	**4.7**	5.1	1.7	.3	25.5
2005–06	Washington	80	80	**42.3**	.447	.369	.820	3.5	6.1	**2.0**	.3	**29.3**
2006–07	Washington	74	73	39.8	.418	.351	**.844**	4.6	6.0	1.9	.2	28.4
2007–08	Washington	13	8	32.7	.398	.282	.771	3.9	5.1	1.8	.1	19.4
2008–09	Washington	2	2	31.5	.261	.286	.750	4.5	**10.0**	.0	.5	13.0
2009–10	Washington	32	32	36.5	.411	.348	.739	4.2	7.2	1.3	.3	22.6
2010–11	Washington	21	14	34.6	.394	.324	.836	3.3	5.6	1.4	**.6**	17.3
2010–11	Orlando	49	2	21.6	.344	.275	.744	2.4	3.2	.9	.2	8.0
2011–12	Memphis	17	0	12.4	.406	.333	.700	1.1	1.1	.6	.1	4.2
Career		552	455	35.0	.421	.351	.803	3.9	5.3	1.6	.2	20.7
All-Star		3	1	15.0	.261	.250	.500	1.0	2.3	1.0	.0	5.3

=== Playoffs ===
Year	Team	GP	GS	MPG	FG%	3P%	FT%	RPG	APG	SPG	BPG	PPG
2005	Washington	**10**	**10**	45.0	.376	.234	.766	5.2	**6.2**	2.1	.6	23.6
2006	Washington	6	6	**47.3**	**.464**	**.435**	.771	**5.5**	5.3	**2.2**	**.7**	**34.0**
2008	Washington	4	2	23.5	.389	.417	**.833**	1.8	2.8	.5	.0	10.8
2011	Orlando	5	0	16.2	.429	.250	.667	2.8	2.4	.2	.2	8.6
2012	Memphis	6	0	12.5	.250	.000	.000	1.2	.2	.0	.0	0.7
Career		31	18	30.1	.410	.305	.769	3.5	3.8	1.2	.4	17.1

=== College ===
Year	Team	GP	GS	MPG	FG%	3P%	FT%	RPG	APG	SPG	BPG	PPG
1999–00	Arizona	34	31	32.1	.453	.292	.750	4.1	2.1	2.1	.3	15.4
2000–01	Arizona	36	33	29.0	.479	.416	.724	3.6	2.3	1.8	.2	16.2
Career		70	64	30.5	.466	.361	.738	3.8	2.2	1.9	.2	15.8

== Awards and honors ==
- 3-time NBA All-Star: 2005, 2006, 2007
- 3-time All-NBA Team:

- Second team: 2007
- Third team: 2005, 2006

- NBA Most Improved Player Award: 2003
- Rising Stars Challenge MVP (2003)
- NBA regular season leader, minutes played: 2006 (3,384)
- NBA three-point scoring leader: (2007)
- NBA Eastern Conference Player of the Month for December 2006. Averaged a league-high 34.1 points per game during December.
- 7-time NBA Eastern Conference Player of the Week (1-time in 2004–05, 3-time in 2005–06 and 2006–07).
- NBA Western Conference Rookie of the Month for April 2002.
- Cover Player of NBA Live 08
- 2007 Weblog Award for Best Celebrity Blogger
- All-Pac-10 First Team: 2001

=== Career records ===
- Career-high 60 points on December 17, 2006, vs. the Los Angeles Lakers (breaking Earl Monroe's franchise record of 56 on February 13, 1968).
- Career 50-plus-point games (regular season): 3
- Career 40-plus-point games (regular season): 29 (28 with Washington)
- Career 40-plus-point games (playoffs): 1
- On November 6, 2009, he scored his 10,000th career point, making a three-pointer against the Indiana Pacers.
- Most points scored in an overtime period (regular season): 16, set on December 17, 2006

=== Wizards franchise records ===
- Held franchise record for most three-point field goals made all time with 868
- Holds franchise record for most points in a game (60 against the Los Angeles Lakers).
- Holds franchise record for most turnovers in a game (12 against the Miami Heat, November 11, 2009).

== See also ==
- List of NBA single-game scoring leaders
- List of people banned or suspended by the NBA
