= Underdog Fantasy Sports =

Fantasy sports website

Underdog Fantasy Sports is an online daily fantasy sports website and mobile app that is legal in several U.S. states. The app was launched in 2020, and was valued at $485 million in 2022.

== Games ==
=== Best ball ===
"Best ball" is a season-long, weekly, and daily fantasy format, in which the user drafts a team, but there are no managerial moves that the user can make. Once rosters are drafted, they cannot be interfered with. Points are given based on player performance and the highest scoring players are counted towards the user's score.

=== Pick'em ===
"Pick'em" is a mode in which players will build a parlay with player props. Players can select over or under on a specific player's stat, and if they get all the picks correct, they win large multiplied payouts. This mode is offered for MLB, NBA, NHL, NFL, CBB, CFB, PGA, Tennis, UFC, F1, FIFA and esports.

== Podcasts ==
In addition to fantasy sports, Underdog Fantasy Sports also produces and distributes sports podcasts including Gil's Arenas, Section 10, and Baseball is Dead.

== Legal status ==
Underdog is legal for playing best ball and pick'em contests in 31 U.S. states. Only best ball mode is offered in nine of the states; the app is not legal in Connecticut, Delaware, Hawaii, Idaho, Iowa, Louisiana, Michigan, Montana, Nevada, and Washington.
