= Jameer Nelson =

American basketball player (born 1982)

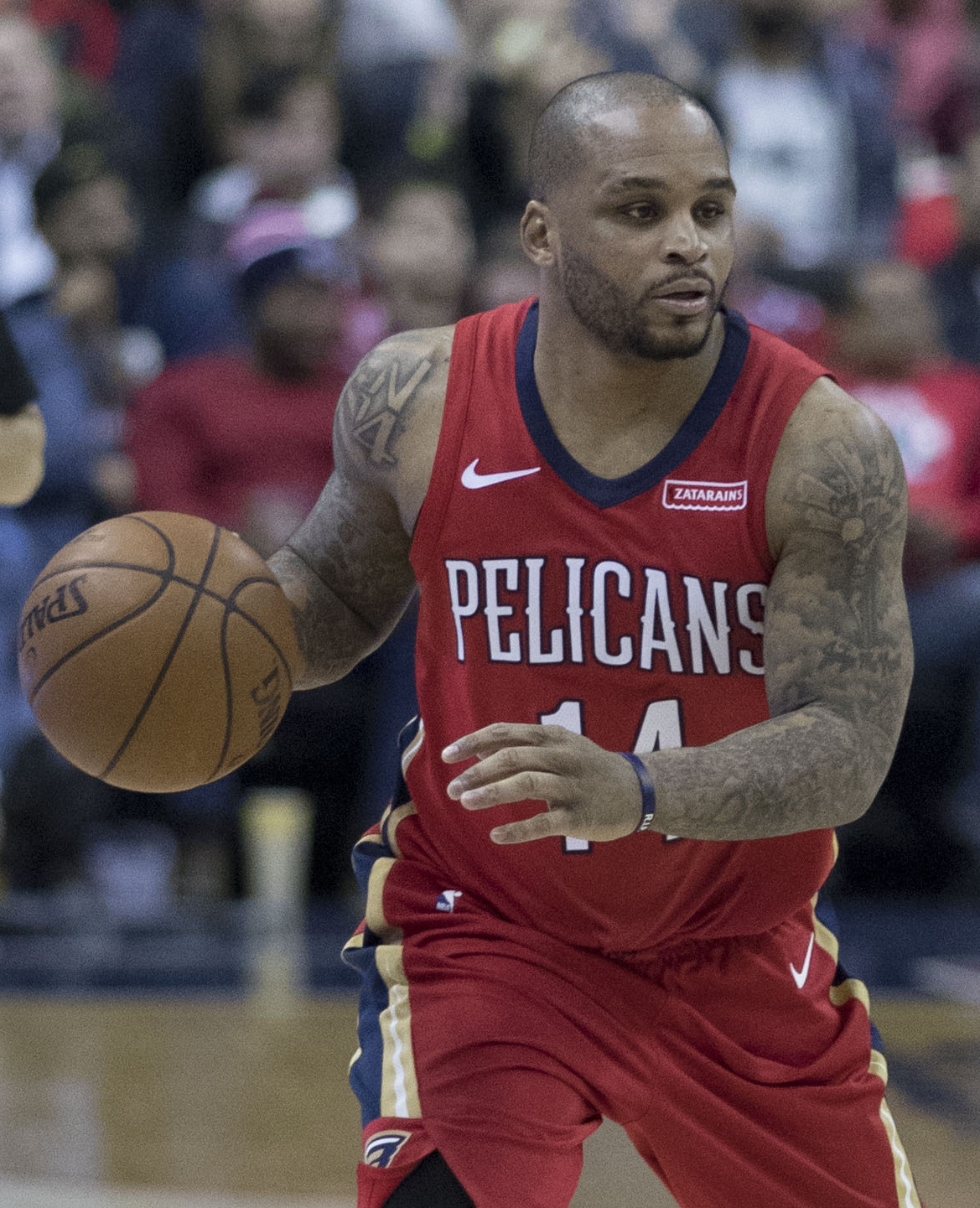
- Nelson with the New Orleans Pelicans in 2017

Philadelphia 76ers
- Title: Executive vice president of basketball operations
- League: NBA

Personal information
- Born: February 9, 1982 (age 44) Chester, Pennsylvania, U.S.
- Listed height: 6 ft 0 in (1.83 m)
- Listed weight: 190 lb (86 kg)

Career information
- High school: Chester (Chester, Pennsylvania)
- College: Saint Joseph's (2000–2004)
- NBA draft: 2004: 1st round, 20th overall pick
- Drafted by: Denver Nuggets
- Playing career: 2004–2018
- Position: Point guard
- Number: 14, 28, 1, 41

Career history
- 2004–2014: Orlando Magic
- 2014: Dallas Mavericks
- 2014–2015: Boston Celtics
- 2015–2017: Denver Nuggets
- 2017–2018: New Orleans Pelicans
- 2018: Detroit Pistons

Career highlights
- NBA All-Star (2009); NBA All-Rookie Second Team (2005); National college player of the year (2004); Consensus first-team All-American (2004); Bob Cousy Award (2004); Frances Pomeroy Naismith Award (2004); Atlantic 10 Player of the Year (2004); Adolph Rupp Trophy (2004); 3× First-team All-Atlantic 10 (2002–2004); Second-team All-Atlantic 10 (2001); 2× Atlantic 10 All-Defensive Team (2003, 2004); No. 14 retired by Saint Joseph's Hawks

Career NBA statistics
- Points: 9,940 (11.3 ppg)
- Rebounds: 2,595 (3.0 rpg)
- Assists: 4,508 (5.1 apg)
- Stats at NBA.com
- Stats at Basketball Reference
Medals
Men's basketball
Representing United States
FIBA U21 World Championship
Gold medal – first place	2001 Saitama	Team

Jameer Lamar Nelson Sr. (born February 9, 1982) is an American former professional basketball player who currently serves as the executive vice president of basketball operations for the Philadelphia 76ers of the National Basketball Association (NBA). He played college basketball for the Saint Joseph's Hawks, where he was named national college player of the year in 2004. Drafted 20th overall in the 2004 NBA draft, Nelson spent the first ten years of his NBA career with the Orlando Magic. In 2009, he was named an All-Star and made an appearance in the NBA Finals with the Magic. He also played in the NBA for the Dallas Mavericks, Boston Celtics, Denver Nuggets, New Orleans Pelicans, and Detroit Pistons.

== High school career ==
Nelson attended Chester High School in Chester, Pennsylvania and was a letterman in basketball. In 2000, he helped lead his team to the PIAA AAAA State championship.

== College career ==
Nelson began his play at Saint Joseph's University in the 2000–01 season. He had a breakout freshman season in which he was named unanimous National Freshman of the Year. During his junior season in 2002–03, he averaged 19.7 points per game, 5.1 rebounds per game, and 4.7 assists per game. He declared for the 2003 NBA draft, but later decided to remain for his senior season.

Nelson led the Saint Joseph's Hawks to a 27–0 regular season record in 2003–04. The Hawks' first loss came in the Atlantic 10 tournament to Xavier. Nelson and junior guard Delonte West formed what was largely considered the nation's best backcourt, helping the Hawks earn a #1 seed in the NCAA tournament. They advanced to the Elite Eight and were within seconds of the Final Four before Oklahoma State Cowboys' John Lucas III hit a three-pointer with only a few seconds remaining (after the make, Nelson dribbled up the court and had a chance to tie the game, but his 15-foot shot fell short). Saint Joseph's finished with a 30–2 record, the best in the university's history. Nelson averaged 20.6 points, 5.3 assists, and 2.9 steals per game. He received the Lowe's Senior CLASS Award his final year, recognizing him as the nation's top senior men's basketball player. He left the Hawks as the best player in the program's history, as its all-time leader in scoring (2,094 points), assists (714), and steals (256). Nelson's number was retired by the university on April 23, 2004.

Because of his extraordinary accomplishments as a senior, Nelson won the 2004 Wooden Award, the 2004 Naismith Award, the 2004 Bob Cousy Award, the Rupp Trophy, the Oscar Robertson Trophy and many more accolades, including being featured on the cover of Sports Illustrated. Nelson was the first Atlantic 10 athlete to be on the cover of the magazine since Mark Macon in 1988.

== Professional career ==
=== Orlando Magic (2004–2014) ===
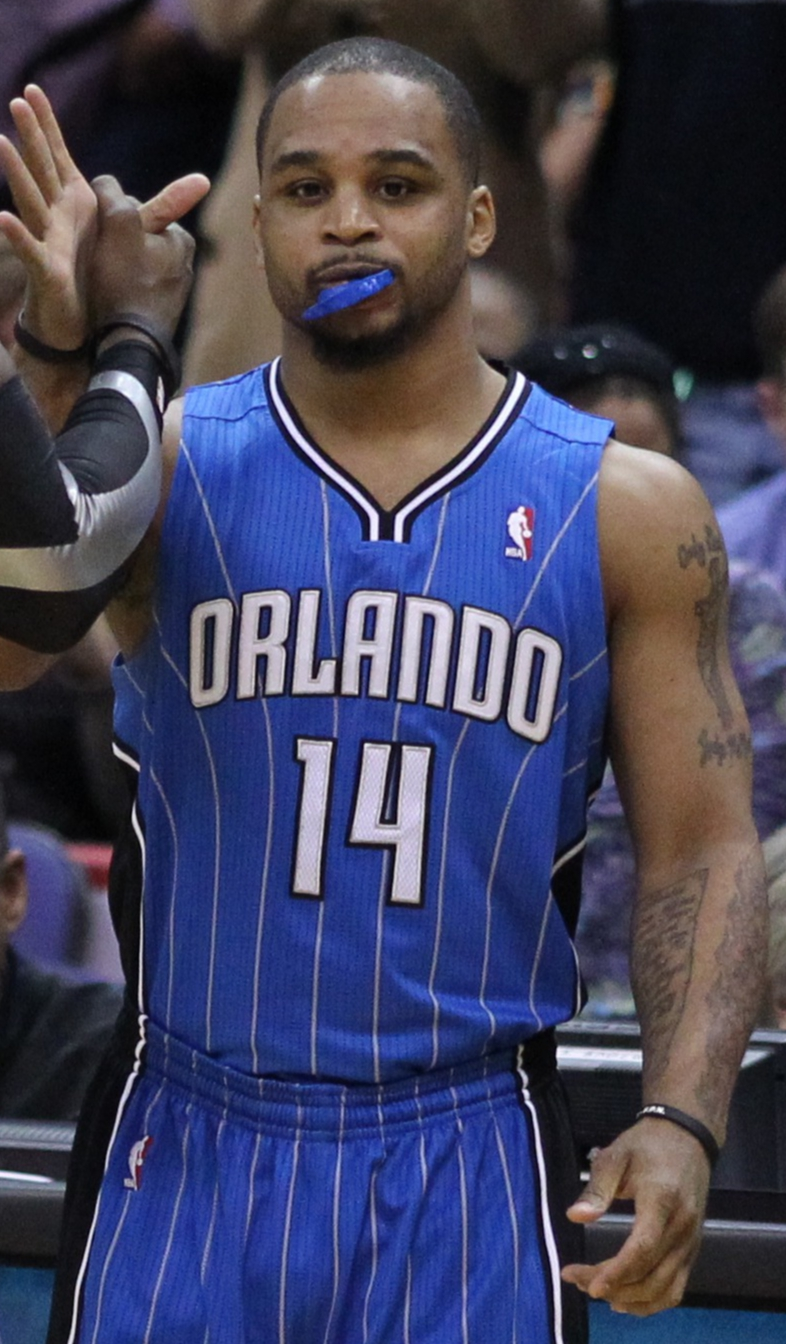
Nelson spent 11 seasons with Orlando from 2004 to 2014.

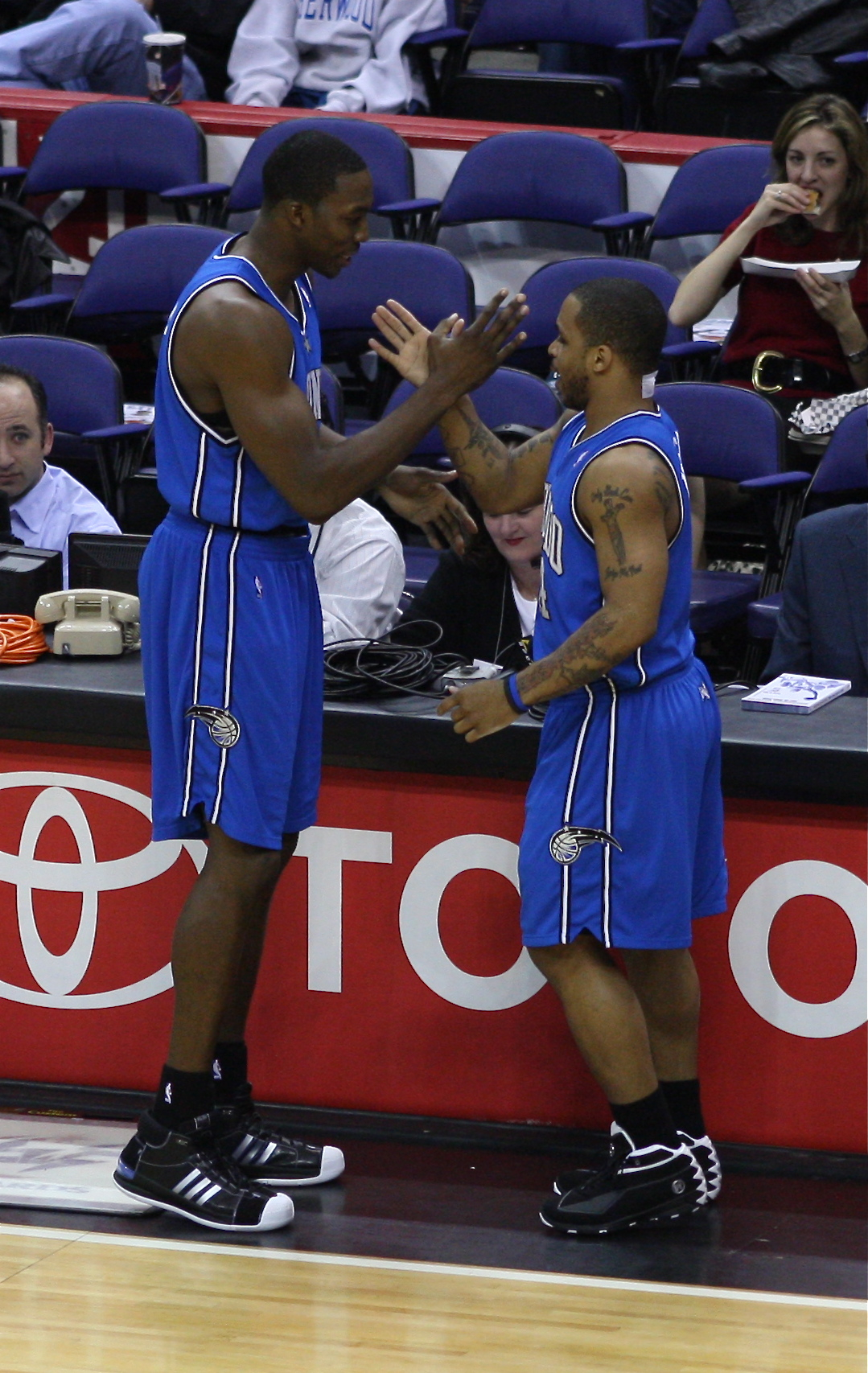
Nelson with then-Magic teammate Dwight Howard

Nelson was selected with the 20th overall pick in the 2004 NBA draft by the Denver Nuggets, and was subsequently traded to the Orlando Magic for a 2005 first-round draft pick. Though many speculated he would be a top 10 pick, he fell to number 20, and the Magic were able to acquire both Nelson and Dwight Howard in the same draft.

As a rookie, Nelson served as the primary backup to the Magic's All-Star point guard Steve Francis. Due to Nelson's impressive play, the Magic moved Francis to shooting guard to make room for Nelson to start at point guard. He was named to the NBA All-Rookie Second Team, and garnered Rookie of the Year consideration.

On February 22, 2006, the Magic dealt Francis to the New York Knicks, paving the way for Nelson to become the long-term starting point guard of Orlando. Nelson's play improved with the mid-season trade of Francis, finishing the season with averages of 14.6 points and 5 assists per game on 48.3% field goal shooting.

The following year, Nelson helped lead the Magic back into the postseason for the first time since 2003. He averaged 14.3 points, 3 rebounds, and 3.3 assists per game during the NBA playoffs, however the Magic were ultimately swept by the top-seeded Detroit Pistons in the first round.

During the 2008 All-Star weekend Slam Dunk Contest, Nelson assisted teammate Dwight Howard on several of his dunks, including the famous Superman dunk. That year, the Magic once again made the playoffs, defeating the Toronto Raptors in the first round before falling to the Pistons in the second round. He averaged 16.2 points, 4.7 assists and 4.1 rebounds per game through the playoffs, helping Orlando to their first playoff series win in 12 years.

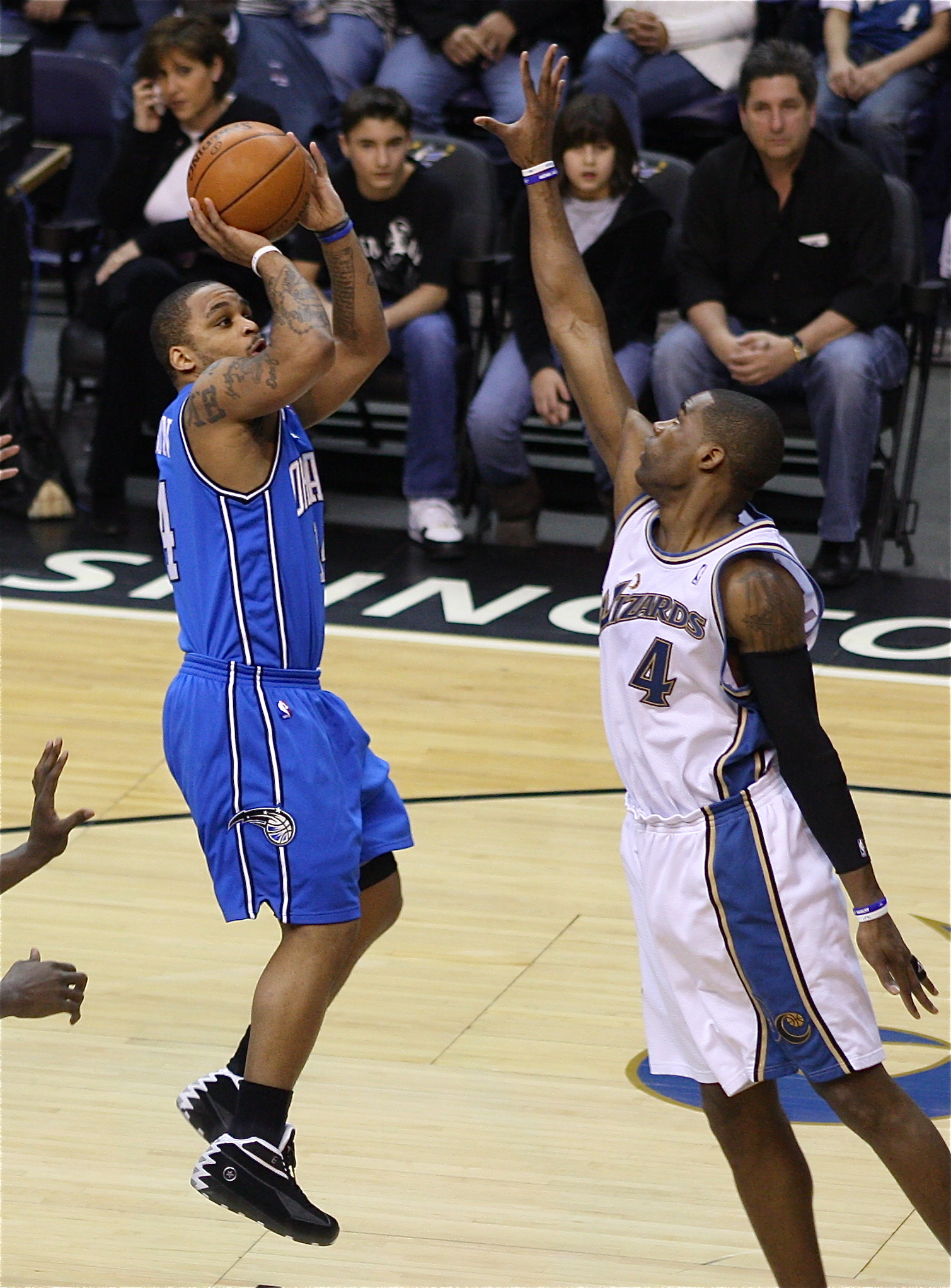
Nelson taking a shot over Antawn Jamison of the Washington Wizards

Nelson set career highs in points, steals, and shooting percentages during the 2008–09 NBA season. He, along with teammates Dwight Howard and Rashard Lewis, was selected to the 2009 NBA All-Star Game. However, a torn labrum in his right shoulder forced him to miss the game. At the time of the injury, Nelson was averaging 16.7 points and 5.4 assists per game. After a four-month recovery, Nelson returned during the 2009 NBA Finals, sharing point guard duties with Rafer Alston as the Magic lost to the Los Angeles Lakers in five games.

On November 16, Nelson suffered a torn meniscus in his left knee, and had arthroscopic surgery to repair his knee. He returned to action on December 21. Nelson and the Magic again surged into the playoffs with their third straight Southeast Division title, sweeping the Charlotte Bobcats and Atlanta Hawks before falling to the Boston Celtics in six games in the Eastern Conference Finals. He averaged 19 points and 4.8 assists per game in Orlando's 14 playoff games.

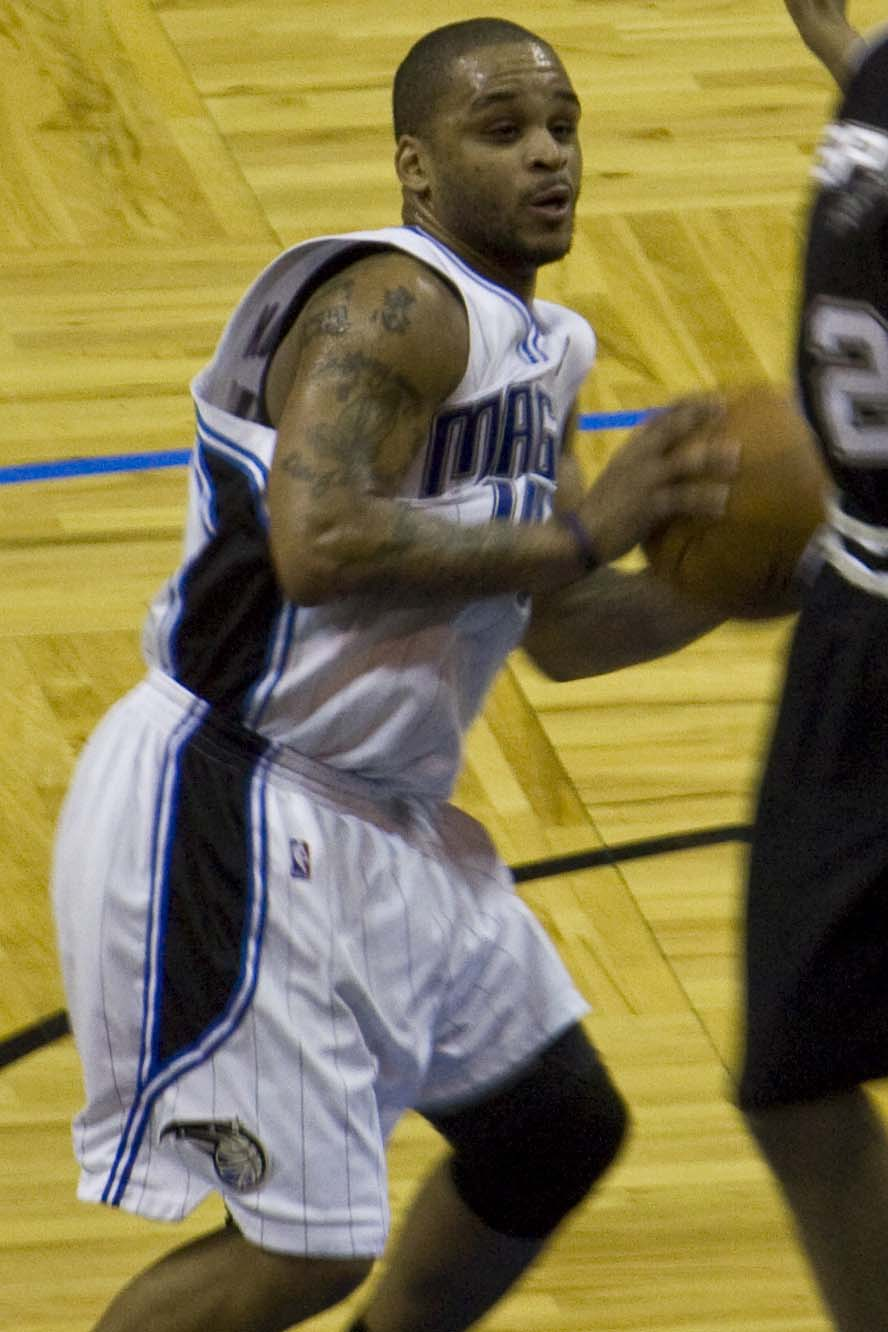
Nelson getting ready to take a shot against Richard Jefferson of the San Antonio Spurs

On March 18, 2011, Nelson made a game winning buzzer beater against the Denver Nuggets to secure an 85–82 victory for Orlando. On April 10, 2011, Nelson's last-second three-pointer was ruled "no basket", and the Magic lost to the Chicago Bulls 102–99.

Nelson and Dwight Howard, who were close friends since their rookie seasons, were on opposite sides of a trade that sent Rashard Lewis to Washington in exchange for Gilbert Arenas (Nelson considered Lewis one of the team's leaders while Howard reportedly pushed management into making the trade). Their relationship was further strained when Howard publicly stated his desire to play with a superstar point guard like Deron Williams or Chris Paul, and was reportedly the driving force behind the firing of coach Stan Van Gundy. Howard eventually forced a trade to the Lakers in the 2012 offseason. Despite this, Nelson re-signed with the Magic on a three-year deal.

On February 23, 2014, Nelson scored his 8020th point, passing Shaquille O'Neal for fourth place on the Magic's all-time scoring list.

On June 30, 2014, he was waived by the Magic after 10 seasons with the team.

=== Dallas Mavericks (2014) ===
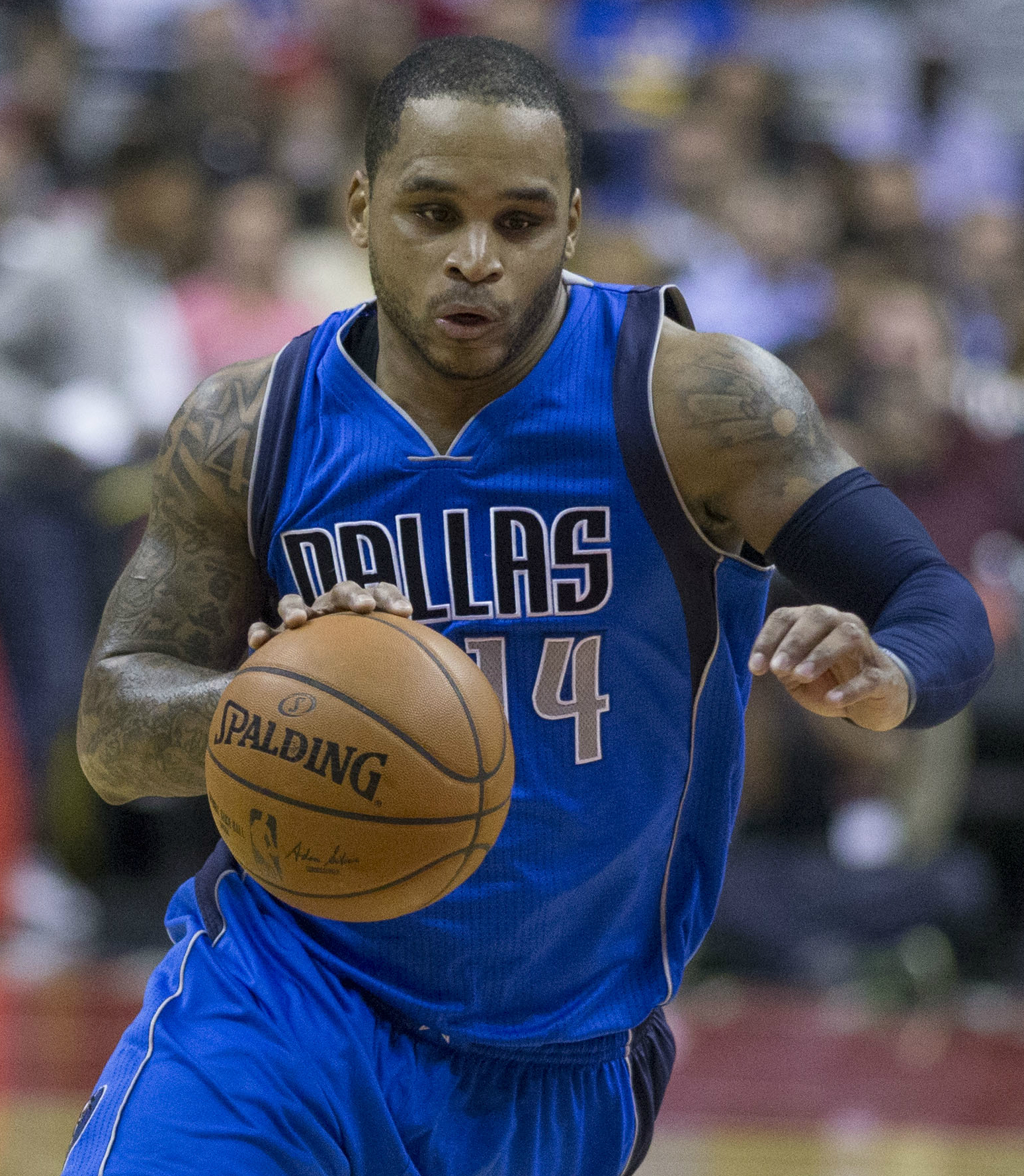
Nelson spent the first 23 games of the 2014–15 season with Dallas.

On July 24, 2014, Nelson signed a two-year, $5.6 million contract with the Dallas Mavericks. He appeared in 23 games for the Mavericks and averaged 7.3 points and 4.1 assists per game.

=== Boston Celtics (2014–2015) ===
On December 18, 2014, Nelson was traded, along with Jae Crowder, Brandan Wright, a 2015 first-round pick, a 2016 second-round pick and a $12.9 million trade exception, to the Boston Celtics in exchange for Rajon Rondo and Dwight Powell. In six games for Boston, Nelson averaged 4.8 points and 5.5 assists per game. In his second game with Boston, Nelson returned to Orlando for the first time since leaving for Dallas as a free agent.

=== Denver Nuggets (2015–2017) ===
On January 13, 2015, Nelson was traded to the Denver Nuggets in exchange for Nate Robinson. On June 26, 2015, Nelson opted out of the remaining year of his contract with the Nuggets to become a free agent.

On August 7, 2015, Nelson re-signed with the Nuggets.

On October 18, 2017, Nelson was waived by the Nuggets.

=== New Orleans Pelicans (2017–2018) ===
On October 22, 2017, Nelson signed with the New Orleans Pelicans.

=== Detroit Pistons (2018) ===
On February 1, 2018, Nelson was traded, along with Ömer Aşık, Tony Allen and a protected first-round pick, to the Chicago Bulls in exchange for Nikola Mirotić and a 2018 second-round pick. In addition, Chicago will have the right to swap its 2021 second-round pick with New Orleans' own 2021 second-round pick. Seven days later, he was traded to the Detroit Pistons in exchange for Willie Reed and future second-round draft considerations.

Nelson's final NBA game was played on March 13, 2018, in a 79–110 loss to the Utah Jazz. In his final game, Nelson played for 26 minutes and recorded 4 assists, 1 rebound, 1 steal but no points.

== Executive career ==
On November 11, 2020, the Delaware Blue Coats of the NBA G League named Nelson as the assistant general manager. On May 13, 2025, Nelson was promoted to serve as the assistant general manager for the Philadelphia 76ers under Daryl Morey. On June 7, 2026, after Morey was fired and Mike Gansey was hired as president of basketball operations, Nelson was promoted to executive vice president of basketball operations.

== Career statistics ==
Legend
GP	Games played	GS	Games started	MPG	Minutes per game
FG%	Field goal percentage	3P%	3-point field goal percentage	FT%	Free throw percentage
RPG	Rebounds per game	APG	Assists per game	SPG	Steals per game
BPG	Blocks per game	PPG	Points per game	**Bold**	Career high

=== College ===
Year	Team	GP	GS	MPG	FG%	3P%	FT%	RPG	APG	SPG	BPG	PPG
2000–01	Saint Joseph's	**33**	**33**	33.8	.461	.373	**.820**	4.0	**6.5**	1.7	.1	12.5
2001–02	Saint Joseph's	30	30	**35.5**	.438	.359	.762	4.8	6.3	1.3	.0	14.4
2002–03	Saint Joseph's	30	30	34.9	.437	.339	.772	**5.1**	4.7	2.2	**.2**	19.7
2003–04	Saint Joseph's	32	32	33.9	**.475**	**.390**	.792	4.7	5.3	**2.8**	.0	**20.6**
Career		125	125	34.5	.454	.365	.786	4.6	5.7	2.0	.1	16.8

=== NBA ===
==== Regular season ====
Year	Team	GP	GS	MPG	FG%	3P%	FT%	RPG	APG	SPG	BPG	PPG
2004–05	Orlando	**79**	21	20.4	.455	.312	.682	2.4	3.0	1.0	.0	8.7
2005–06	Orlando	62	33	28.8	.483	.424	.779	2.9	4.9	1.1	**.1**	14.6
2006–07	Orlando	77	**77**	30.3	.430	.335	.828	3.1	4.3	.9	**.1**	13.0
2007–08	Orlando	69	62	28.4	.469	.416	.828	3.5	5.6	.9	**.1**	10.9
2008–09	Orlando	42	42	31.2	**.503**	**.453**	.887	3.5	5.4	1.2	**.1**	**16.7**
2009–10	Orlando	65	64	28.6	.449	.381	.845	3.0	5.4	.7	.0	12.6
2010–11	Orlando	76	76	30.5	.446	.401	.802	3.0	6.0	1.0	.0	13.1
2011–12	Orlando	57	57	29.9	.427	.377	.807	3.2	5.7	.7	**.1**	11.9
2012–13	Orlando	56	56	**35.3**	.392	.341	.873	**3.7**	**7.4**	**1.3**	**.1**	14.7
2013–14	Orlando	68	68	32.0	.394	.348	.857	3.4	7.0	.8	**.1**	12.1
2014–15	Dallas	23	23	25.4	.374	.369	.875	2.7	4.1	.7	**.1**	7.3
2014–15	Boston	6	1	20.2	.220	.200	.667	2.8	5.5	1.2	.0	4.8
2014–15	Denver	34	5	20.6	.450	.354	.579	1.9	3.7	.7	**.1**	9.6
2015–16	Denver	39	15	26.6	.368	.299	.857	2.9	4.9	.6	**.1**	7.7
2016–17	Denver	75	40	27.3	.444	.388	.714	2.6	5.1	.7	**.1**	9.2
2017–18	New Orleans	43	0	20.9	.410	.364	.765	2.2	3.6	.5	**.1**	5.1
2017–18	Detroit	7	0	16.6	.282	.071	**1.000**	1.1	3.3	.6	**.1**	3.7
Career		878	641	27.9	.436	.368	.810	3.0	5.1	.9	.1	11.3

==== Playoffs ====
Year	Team	GP	GS	MPG	FG%	3P%	FT%	RPG	APG	SPG	BPG	PPG
2007	Orlando	4	4	32.3	.420	.357	**.909**	3.0	3.3	.8	.0	14.3
2008	Orlando	10	10	33.3	**.504**	**.488**	.757	4.1	4.7	.3	**.2**	16.2
2009	Orlando	5	0	18.0	.348	.167	.500	1.4	2.8	.2	.0	3.8
2010	Orlando	**14**	**14**	34.2	.479	.393	.823	3.6	4.8	1.0	.0	**19.0**
2011	Orlando	6	6	36.0	.378	.231	.786	**4.2**	5.0	**2.0**	.0	13.2
2012	Orlando	5	5	**36.4**	.392	.320	.750	3.8	**6.6**	.8	**.2**	15.6
Career		44	39	32.5	.445	.372	.792	3.5	4.6	.8	.1	15.0

== Personal life ==
On August 30, 2007, Nelson's father, Floyd "Pete" Nelson, was reported missing after disappearing at his Chester tugboat repair shop located along the docks of the Delaware River at Front Street and Highland Avenue. Authorities said no one saw his father fall into the water. Nelson arrived at the search scene the next morning. On September 2, 2007, Floyd Nelson's body was found floating in the Delaware River. His death was ruled accidental.

He has a tattoo on his back that says All Eyes On Me, and another one that says Accomplish Everything Without Fear.

On July 5, 2008, he married long-time girlfriend, Imani Tillery. He has one son from a previous relationship, Jameer Jr., who was a guard for TCU.
