= 2007 NBA All-Star Game =

Exhibition basketball game

	1	2	3	4	Total
East	31	28	29	44	132
West	39	40	40	34	153
- Date: February 18, 2007
- Arena: Thomas & Mack Center
- City: Paradise
- MVP: Kobe Bryant (West)
- National anthem: Roxanne Potvin (CAN); Danny Gans & Friends (USA)
- Halftime show: Christina Aguilera, Toni Braxton, Cirque du Soleil
- Attendance: 15,694
- Network: TNT; ESPN Radio
- Announcers: Marv Albert, Doug Collins, and Steve Kerr; Kevin Harlan, Steve Kerr, Reggie Miller, Charles Barkley, Kenny Smith and Magic Johnson (All-Star Saturday Night); Dick Stockton, Reggie Miller and John Thompson (Rookie Challenge); Jim Durham and Jack Ramsay

NBA All-Star Game
< 2006	2008 >

The 2007 NBA All-Star Game was an exhibition basketball game that was played on February 18, 2007, during the National Basketball Association's (NBA) 2006–07 season. It was the 56th edition of the NBA All-Star Game, and was played at the University of Nevada, Las Vegas's Thomas & Mack Center in Paradise, Nevada. The Western Conference defeated the Eastern Conference, 153–132. Kobe Bryant was named the All-Star Game Most Valuable Player (MVP), having recorded 31 points, 5 rebounds, 6 assists, and 6 steals. It was the first time the All-Star Game was played in a city without an NBA franchise and first to be played on a college campus. The game was nationally televised on TNT in the United States at 9 p.m. ET as part of the NBA on TNT coverage.

The Western Conference set All-Star records with 69 field goals and 52 assists. Amare Stoudemire scored 29 points with nine rebounds, and Carmelo Anthony had 20 points and nine rebounds for the West. LeBron James led the Eastern Conference with 28 points, six rebounds, and six assists, and Dwight Howard tallied 20 points and 12 boards. Bryant, previously the MVP of the 2002 All-Star Game, moved from 11th to 10th place on all-time All-star scoring, surpassing Magic Johnson. Dirk Nowitzki became the first European born-player to be a starter at the All-Star Game.

As announced on August 5, 2005, the NBA, led by Commissioner David Stern, did not allow wagering on the results of the game in the state of Nevada.

== Venues ==
The choice to choose Las Vegas as the location was widely regarded as a bid by the city to give it its first major sports franchise. Mayor Oscar Goodman met with David Stern to discuss the possibility during the events. On April 5, Goodman sent a letter to the commissioner, requesting a meeting to sort out the matter. All-Star MVP and former teammates Kobe Bryant and Shaquille O'Neal welcomed the possibility, amid the gambling.

== All-Star Game ==
=== Coaches ===
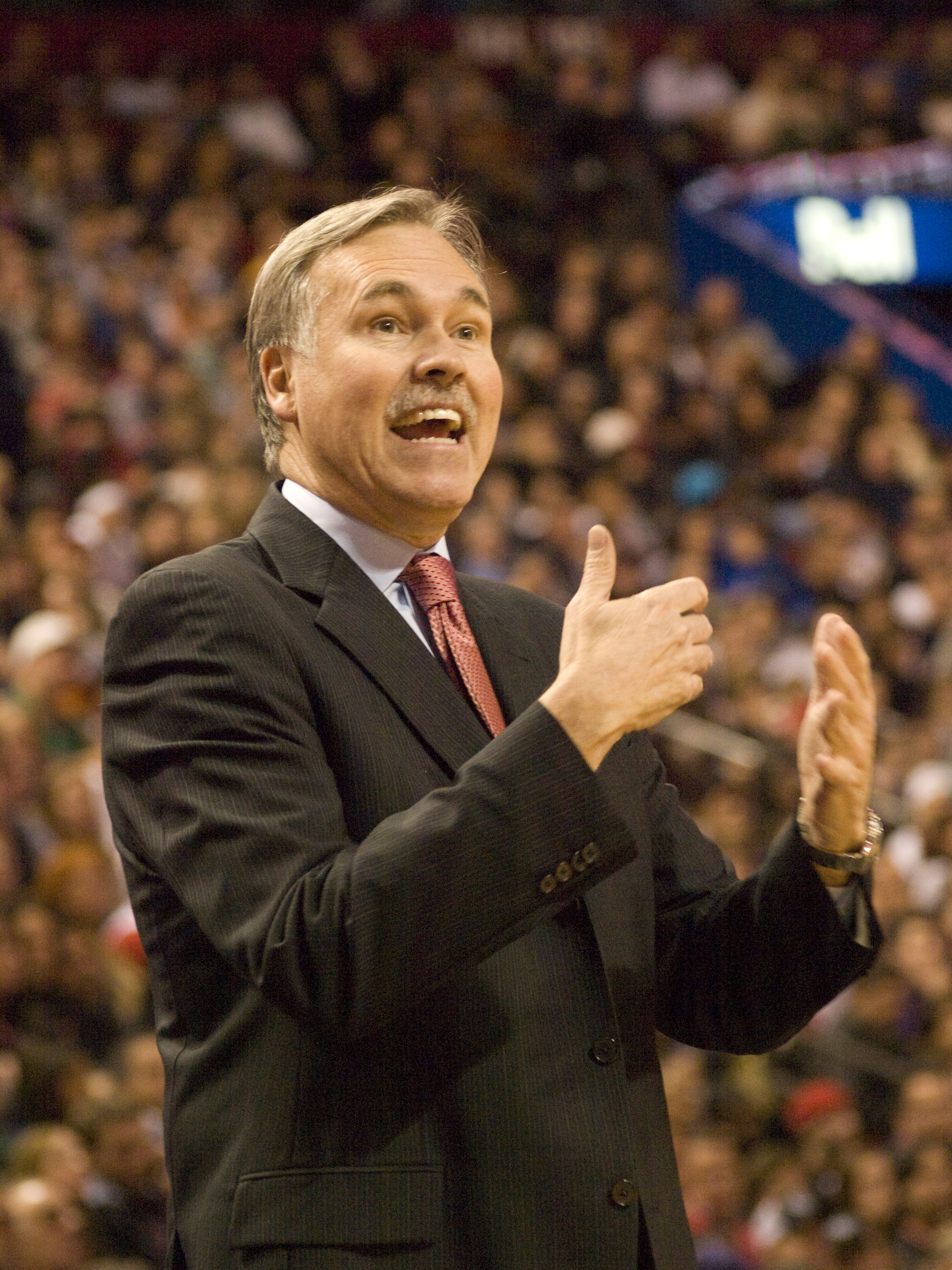
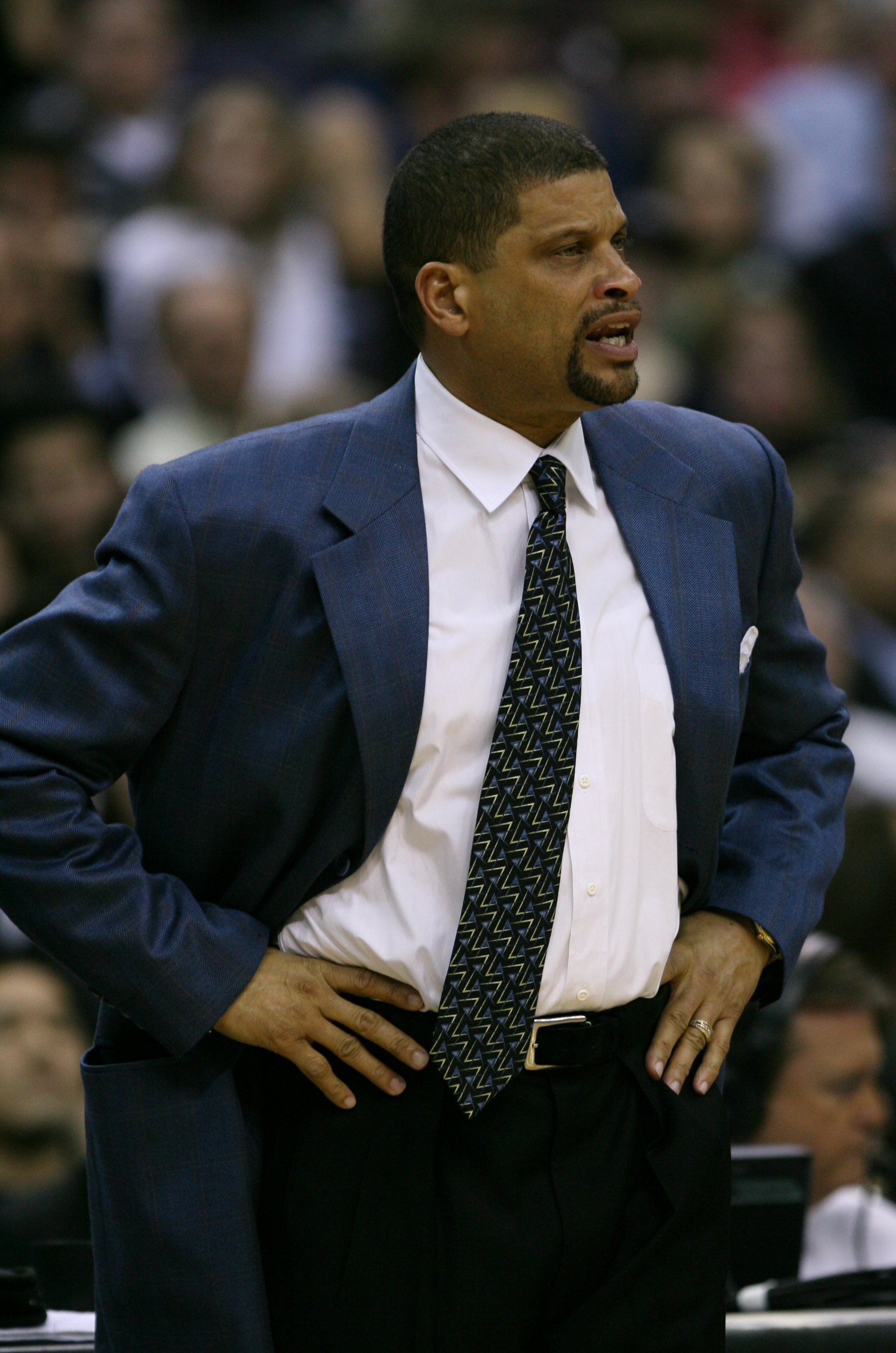
Mike D'Antoni (left) and Eddie Jordan (right) were selected as the West and East head coach, respectively.

The coach whose team has the best record in its conference is granted the right to coach their team. However, despite this rule, no one is allowed to coach in consecutive All-Star Games. The West's coach was Mike D'Antoni of the Phoenix Suns, as Avery Johnson, head coach of the Western Conference leader Dallas Mavericks, was ineligible due to coaching the West last year. The East's coach was Eddie Jordan of the Washington Wizards, as Flip Saunders, head coach of the Eastern Conference leader Detroit Pistons, was also ineligible due to coaching the East last year.

=== Players ===
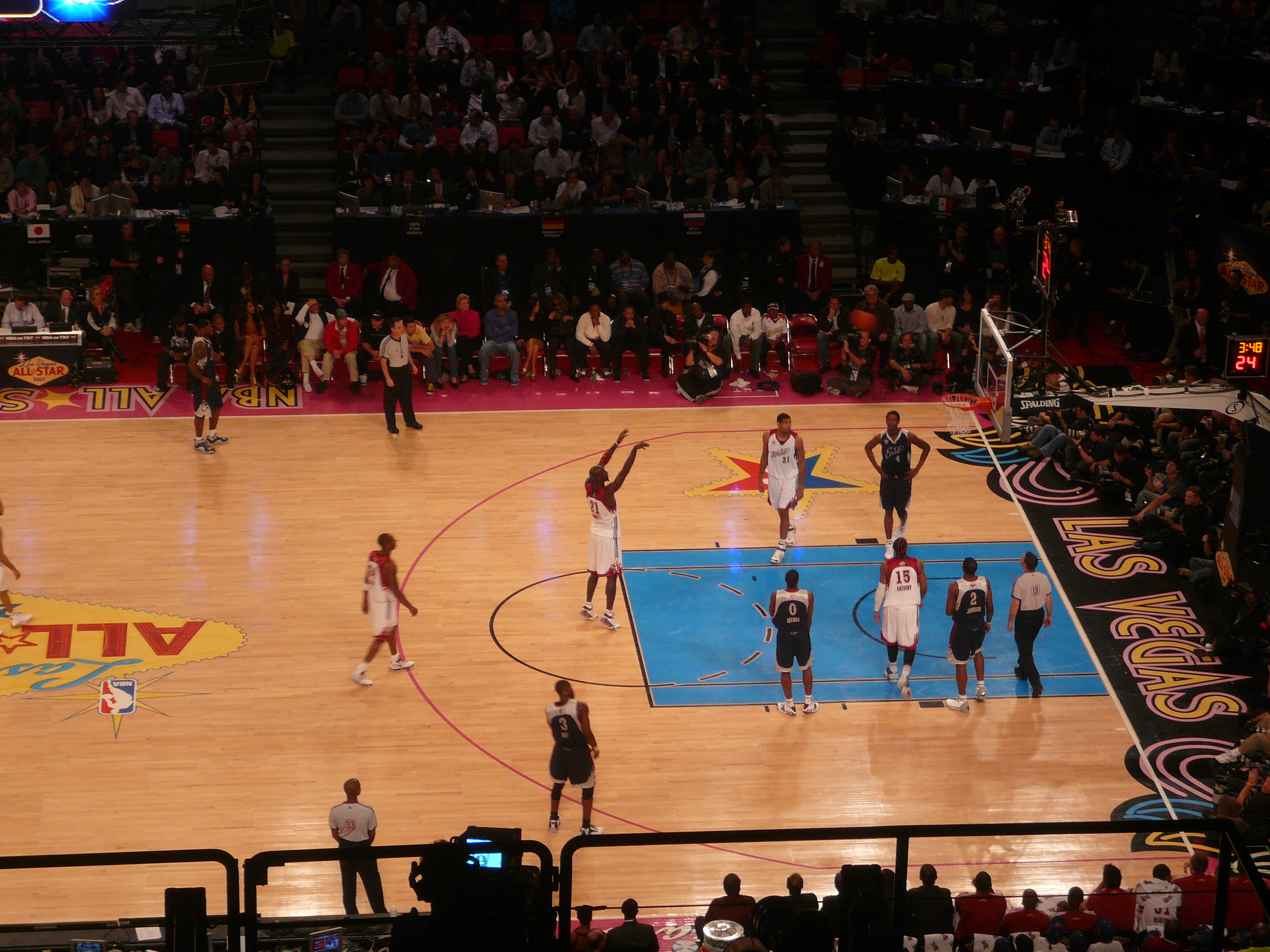
During the 2007 All-Star Game

The 2006 All-Star MVP LeBron James was the top vote-getter, receiving 2,516,049 votes for the Eastern Conference's small forward position. One player has received more votes in NBA history: Dwight Howard with 3,150,181. Three other players, guards Kobe Bryant of the Lakers and Dwyane Wade of the Miami Heat and center Yao of the Houston Rockets, received more than two million votes. All three started at their positions in their respective conference—with the exception of Yao Ming due to injury.

In the Western Conference, the race was tight. Allen Iverson, formerly the seven-time East point guard starter, moved to Denver from Philadelphia, attracting votes from reigning NBA MVP Steve Nash. But surprisingly, neither of the two was voted in; both were reserves as swingman Tracy McGrady came in the back door win. Dirk Nowitzki, another player who analysts predicted that would be starting, was not able to muster enough votes to get over former MVP Kevin Garnett's 1,600,000, but was put in by coaches as a reserve and later added to the starting lineup by West coach Mike D'Antoni. Tim Duncan was also voted in as a forward. Carmelo Anthony, the star small forward for the Nuggets, was not voted in as a starter or reserve, contrary to earlier reports that head coaches from the conference would put him in the lineup despite being involved in a brawl, but was allowed as a reserve (because Carlos Boozer was injured). Mehmet Okur of the Utah Jazz and Ray Allen of the Seattle SuperSonics were chosen by Stern to replace the injured Nash and Iverson.

Gilbert Arenas of the East benefited from Iverson's move to the West. In one of the closest races in game history, Arenas gained enough calls to start as the point guard of the East, over the New Jersey Nets' Vince Carter. Carter was eventually named as a reserve along with teammate Jason Kidd. In a controversial race, Shaquille O'Neal was voted in as starting center for the 14th straight time (despite playing only four games up to that point) over young star Dwight Howard. Chris Bosh of the Toronto Raptors was voted by the fans to start, marking the first time a Raptor started since Vince Carter was the top vote getter in his last season in Toronto.

=== Roster ===
Appearance denotes the number of times the player been selected to play in the All-Star game, including 2007. Jason Kidd of the East and Carlos Boozer, Steve Nash, Allen Iverson, and Yao Ming of the West could not play due to injuries. The game featured seven first time All-Stars.

Eastern Conference All-Stars
Pos.	Player	Team	Appearance
Starters
G	Gilbert Arenas	Washington Wizards	3rd
G	Dwyane Wade	Miami Heat	3rd
F	LeBron James	Cleveland Cavaliers	3rd
F	Chris Bosh	Toronto Raptors	2nd
C	Shaquille O'Neal	Miami Heat	14th
Reserves
G	Chauncey Billups	Detroit Pistons	2nd
F	Caron Butler	Washington Wizards	1st
G	Vince Carter	New Jersey Nets	8th
G	Richard Hamilton	Detroit Pistons	2nd
C	Dwight Howard	Orlando Magic	1st
G	Joe Johnson^{2}	Atlanta Hawks	1st
G	Jason Kidd^{1}	New Jersey Nets	8th
F	Jermaine O'Neal	Indiana Pacers	6th

Western Conference All-Stars
Pos.	Player	Team	Appearance
Starters
G	Kobe Bryant	Los Angeles Lakers	9th
G	Tracy McGrady	Houston Rockets	7th
F	Kevin Garnett	Minnesota Timberwolves	10th
F	Tim Duncan	San Antonio Spurs	9th
C	Yao Ming^{1}	Houston Rockets	5th
Reserves
G	Ray Allen^{2}	Seattle SuperSonics	7th
F	Carmelo Anthony^{2}	Denver Nuggets	1st
F	Carlos Boozer^{1}	Utah Jazz	1st
F	Josh Howard^{2}	Dallas Mavericks	1st
G	Allen Iverson^{1}	Denver Nuggets	8th
F	Shawn Marion	Phoenix Suns	4th
G	Steve Nash^{1}	Phoenix Suns	5th
F	Dirk Nowitzki	Dallas Mavericks	6th
C	Mehmet Okur^{2}	Utah Jazz	1st
G	Tony Parker	San Antonio Spurs	2nd
C	Amare Stoudemire	Phoenix Suns	2nd

=== Game ===
TNT

February 18
6:50 p.m. MT

Eastern Conference All-Stars 132, Western Conference All-Stars 153
Scoring by quarter: 31–39, 28–40, 29–40, 44–34
Pts: LeBron James 28; Rebs: Dwight Howard 20	Pts: Kobe Bryant 31

Thomas and Mack Center, Paradise, Nevada
Attendance: 15,694
Referees:
- #24 Mike Callahan
- #33 Sean Corbin
- #13 Monty McCutchen

^1Unable to participate due to injury. Nowitzki was named to the starting lineup in place of Yao.
^2Named to team by commissioner David Stern as replacement for injured player.

== All-Star Weekend ==
=== T-Mobile Rookie Challenge ===
Rookies
Pos.	Player	Team
PF/C	Andrea Bargnani	Toronto Raptors
PG	Jordan Farmar	Los Angeles Lakers
PG/SG	Randy Foye	Minnesota Timberwolves
PF/C	Jorge Garbajosa	Toronto Raptors
SG/SF	Rudy Gay	Memphis Grizzlies
PF	Paul Millsap	Utah Jazz
SG/SF	Adam Morrison	Charlotte Bobcats
PG/SG	Brandon Roy	Portland Trail Blazers
PG	Marcus Williams	New Jersey Nets

Sophomores
Pos.	Player	Team
PF/C	Andrew Bogut	Milwaukee Bucks
C	Andrew Bynum	Los Angeles Lakers
PG/SG	Monta Ellis	Golden State Warriors
PG	Raymond Felton	Charlotte Bobcats
SF	Danny Granger	Indiana Pacers
SG	Luther Head	Houston Rockets
PF	David Lee	New York Knicks
PG	Chris Paul	New Orleans Hornets
PG	Deron Williams	Utah Jazz

TNT

February 16
9:00 p.m. MT

Rookies 114, Sophomores 155
Scoring by half: 48–77, 66–78
Pts: Gay/Millsap 20	Pts: David Lee 30

Thomas and Mack Center, Paradise, Nevada
Referees:

David Lee hit all 14 of his field-goal attempts for a game-high 30 points as the Sophomore beat the Rookies for the fifth consecutive year, 155–114. Lee, who added 11 rebounds and four assists, took home MVP of the 2007 Rookie Challenge.

Chris Paul notched novice-game records of 17 assists and nine steals to go with 16 points. Monta Ellis was the beneficiary of many of Paul's assists, as he had 5 alley-oop dunks in a 3:25 span, en route to scoring 28 points. Rudy Gay and Paul Millsap paced the Rookie squad with 22 points apiece.

This game set a number of records for the Rookie Challenge:

- Highest scoring half: 78 points (Sophomores 2nd Half)
- Chris Paul's 17 assist and nine steals

The coaches of the game were Mike O'Koren (Assistant coach of the Washington Wizards) for the Rookie Team, and Marc Iavaroni (Assistant coach of the Phoenix Suns) for the Sophomore team.

=== Foot Locker Three-Point Shootout ===
Contestants
Pos.	Player	Team
PG	Gilbert Arenas	Washington Wizards
SG	Damon Jones	Cleveland Cavaliers
SF	Jason Kapono	Miami Heat
SG	Mike Miller	Memphis Grizzlies
PF	Dirk Nowitzki	Dallas Mavericks
PG	Jason Terry	Dallas Mavericks

Jason Kapono tied Mark Price's final-round record with 24 points and outlasted Gilbert Arenas on his way to the 2007 Foot Locker Three-Point Shootout title. Arenas notched a first-round high of 23 points and had 17 in the finals. Defending champion Dirk Nowitzki had 20 in round one and nine in the finals, and Kapono narrowly made the finals with a first-round score of 19. Mike Miller (18), Damon Jones (15) and Jason Terry (10) were eliminated early.

=== Slam Dunk Contest ===
The Sprite Slam Dunk Contest was a memorable one. Dwight Howard jumped up and dunked while posting a sticker of him laughing, on the backboard. Eventually, Gerald Green and Nate Robinson went to the final round. Robinson looked unimpressive with his first dunk, and Green looked as bad as Robinson. However, Robinson had to do his second dunk after the limited two-minute period, and scored below 40. Green finished it off by getting a perfect score after jumping over a table. The judging panel included an impressive list of former champions who are considered some of the greatest dunkers in NBA history: Michael Jordan, Dominique Wilkins, Julius Erving, Kobe Bryant and Vince Carter.

Contestants
Pos.	Player	Team	Ht.	Wt.
SG	Gerald Green	Boston Celtics	6–8	200
C	Dwight Howard	Orlando Magic	6–11	265
PG	Nate Robinson	New York Knicks	5–9	180
PF	Tyrus Thomas	Chicago Bulls	6–9	215

=== PlayStation Skills Challenge ===
Contestants
Pos.	Player	Team
SG	Kobe Bryant	Los Angeles Lakers
SF	LeBron James	Cleveland Cavaliers
PG	Steve Nash^{1}	Phoenix Suns
PG	Chris Paul^{2}	New Orleans Hornets
SG	Dwyane Wade	Miami Heat

^1Unable to participate due to injury.
^2Named as replacement for injured player.

==== Result ====
Round 1
Name	Chest Pass	Bounce Pass	Jump Shot	Outlet Pass	Time
LeBron James	1	1	2	2	35.4
Chris Paul	3	1	2	3	39.6
Kobe Bryant	1	1	1	1	29.8
Dwyane Wade	2	1	1	1	31.3
Round 2
Name	Chest Pass	Bounce Pass	Jump Shot	Outlet Pass	Time
Dwyane Wade	1	1	1	1	26.4
Kobe Bryant	5	2	1	1	45.8

Dwyane Wade won his second straight Skills Challenge.

=== Haier Shooting Stars Competition ===
The San Antonio team tried to be the first team to win back-to-back titles. Team Chicago (48.8) and Team Detroit (1:06) advanced to final round. Due to Ben Gordon shooting out of order before Candice Dupree, Detroit won by default.

Contestants
Chicago
Ben Gordon	Chicago Bulls
Candice Dupree	Chicago Sky
Scottie Pippen	Chicago Bulls (retired)
Detroit
Chauncey Billups	Detroit Pistons
Swin Cash	Detroit Shock
Bill Laimbeer	Detroit Pistons (retired)
Los Angeles
Smush Parker	Los Angeles Lakers
Temeka Johnson	Los Angeles Sparks
Michael Cooper	Los Angeles Lakers (retired)
San Antonio
Tony Parker	San Antonio Spurs
Kendra Wecker	San Antonio Silver Stars
George Gervin	San Antonio Spurs (retired)

== Schedule ==
- February 15–19: NBA Jam Session
- Friday, February 16: NBA All-Star Celebrity Game
- Friday, February 16: 2007 Rookie Challenge
- Saturday, February 17: 1st Annual D-League All-Star Game
- Saturday, February 17: NBA All-Star Saturday (Slam Dunk Contest, Three-Point Shootout, Shooting Stars Competition, Skills Challenge)
- Sunday, February 18: 56th Annual NBA All-Star Game
