= 2010–11 Orlando Magic season =

NBA professional basketball team season

- Head coach: Stan Van Gundy
- General manager: Otis Smith
- Owner: Richard DeVos
- Arena: Amway Center

Results
- Record: 52–30 (.634)
- Place: Division: 2nd (Southeast); Conference: 4th (Eastern)
- Playoff finish: First Round (lost to Hawks 2–4)
- Stats at Basketball Reference

Local media
- Television: Fox Sports Florida; Sun Sports
- Radio: WDBO

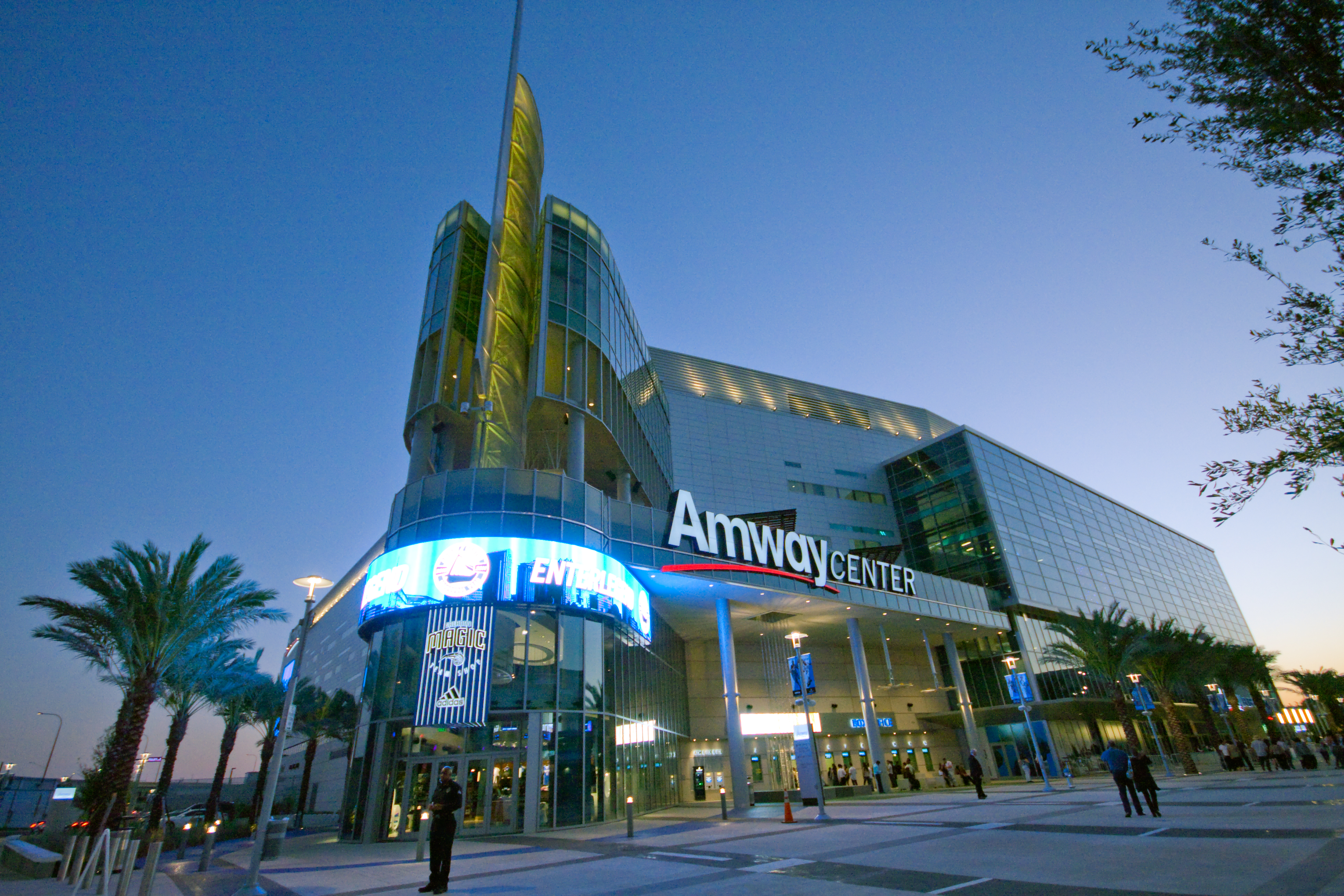
The Orlando Magic moved into the new Amway Center.

The 2010–11 Orlando Magic season was the 22nd season of the Orlando Magic in the National Basketball Association (NBA). This was their first season at the Amway Center.

In the playoffs, the Magic lost to the Atlanta Hawks in six games in the First Round.

== Key dates ==
- June 24: The 2010 NBA draft was held in New York City.
- July 1: The free agency period started.
- October 28: The regular season began.

== Summary ==
=== NBA Draft 2010 ===
Round	Pick	Player	Position	Nationality	College
1	29	Daniel Orton	Center	United States	Kentucky
2	59	Stanley Robinson	Small forward	United States	Connecticut

=== Transactions ===
==== Free agents acquired ====
Player	Date	Former team	Contract terms
Chris Duhon	July 6, 2010	New York Knicks	Four years, $15,000,000
Quentin Richardson	July 12, 2010	Miami Heat	Multi-year deal, $7.5 to 8 million

==== Free agents lost ====
Player	Date	New team	Contract terms
Matt Barnes	July 23, 2010	Los Angeles Lakers	Two years, $3,600,000

==== Players re-signed ====
Player	Date	Contract terms
JJ Redick	July 16, 2010	Three years, $19,000,000
Jason Williams	August 3, 2010	Undisclosed

== Roster ==
2010–11 Orlando Magic roster
Players

Pos.	No.	Player	Height	Weight	DOB	From
F	35	Malik Allen	6 ft 10 in (2.08 m)	255 lb (116 kg)	1978-06-27	Villanova
F	33	Ryan Anderson	6 ft 10 in (2.08 m)	240 lb (109 kg)	1988-05-06	California
G	1	Gilbert Arenas	6 ft 4 in (1.93 m)	215 lb (98 kg)	1982-01-06	Arizona
F	30	Brandon Bass	6 ft 8 in (2.03 m)	250 lb (113 kg)	1985-04-30	LSU
F	3	Earl Clark	6 ft 9 in (2.06 m)	225 lb (102 kg)	1988-01-17	Louisville
G	25	Chris Duhon	6 ft 1 in (1.85 m)	185 lb (84 kg)	1982-08-31	Duke
C	12	Dwight Howard	6 ft 11 in (2.11 m)	265 lb (120 kg)	1985-12-08	SW Atlanta Christian Academy HS (GA)
G	14	Jameer Nelson	6 ft 0 in (1.83 m)	190 lb (86 kg)	1982-02-09	Saint Joseph's
F/C	21	Daniel Orton	6 ft 10 in (2.08 m)	255 lb (116 kg)	1990-08-06	Kentucky
G	7	JJ Redick	6 ft 4 in (1.93 m)	190 lb (86 kg)	1984-06-24	Duke
G	23	Jason Richardson	6 ft 6 in (1.98 m)	225 lb (102 kg)	1981-01-20	Michigan State
G/F	5	Quentin Richardson	6 ft 6 in (1.98 m)	228 lb (103 kg)	1980-04-13	DePaul
F	15	Hedo Türkoğlu	6 ft 10 in (2.08 m)	220 lb (100 kg)	1979-03-19	Turkey

Coaches
Head coach
- Stan Van Gundy
Assistant(s)
- Ahmad Ajami
- Bob Beyer
- Steve Clifford
- Patrick Ewing
- Brendan Malone
- Keon Weise (trainer)

Legend
- (DP) Unsigned draft pick
- (FA) Free agent
- (S) Suspended
- Injured

Roster
Updated: January 26, 2011

== Pre-season ==
=== Game log ===
2010 pre-season game log
Pre-season: 7–0 (home: 4–0; road: 3–0)

Game	Date	Team	Score	High points	High rebounds	High assists	Location Attendance	Record
1	October 5	@ Houston	W 97–88	Dwight Howard (19)	Dwight Howard (12)	Jameer Nelson (7)	State Farm Arena; 4,854	1–0
2	October 8	@ Indiana	W 93–86	Vince Carter (25)	Ryan Anderson (16)	Jameer Nelson (7)	Conseco Fieldhouse; 10,001	2–0
3	October 10	New Orleans	W 135–81	Ryan Anderson, Rashard Lewis, JJ Redick (23)	Dwight Howard (11)	Chris Duhon (7)	Amway Center; 18,516	3–0
4	October 14	Charlotte	W 86–73	Brandon Bass (16)	Brandon Bass (9)	Chris Duhon (6)	Amway Center; 18,846	4–0
5	October 16	Chicago	W 105–67	Vince Carter (21)	Dwight Howard (11)	Chris Duhon (7)	Amway Center; 18,846	5–0
6	October 18	@ Atlanta	W 102–73	Brandon Bass (17)	Dwight Howard (13)	Chris Duhon (10)	Philips Arena; 7,571	6–0
7	October 20	Dallas	W 101–76	Vince Carter, Dwight Howard (20)	Dwight Howard (13)	Jameer Nelson (10)	Amway Center; 18,846	7–0
8	October 22	@ Miami	Cancelled				St. Pete Times Forum	–

2010–11 season schedule

== Regular season ==
=== Standings ===
Southeast Division	W	L	PCT	GB	Home	Road	Div
y-Miami Heat	58	24	.707	–	30–11	28–13	13–3
x-Orlando Magic	52	30	.634	6	29–12	23–18	11–5
x-Atlanta Hawks	44	38	.537	14	24–17	20–21	9–7
Charlotte Bobcats	34	48	.415	24	21–20	13–28	4–12
Washington Wizards	23	59	.280	35	20–21	3–38	3–13

#	Eastern Conference				
#	Team	W	L	PCT	GB
1	z-Chicago Bulls	62	20	.756	–
2	y-Miami Heat	58	24	.707	4
3	y-Boston Celtics	56	26	.683	6
4	x-Orlando Magic	52	30	.634	10
5	x-Atlanta Hawks	44	38	.537	18
6	x-New York Knicks	42	40	.512	20
7	x-Philadelphia 76ers	41	41	.500	21
8	x-Indiana Pacers	37	45	.451	25
9	Milwaukee Bucks	35	47	.427	27
10	Charlotte Bobcats	34	48	.415	28
11	Detroit Pistons	30	52	.366	32
12	New Jersey Nets	24	58	.293	38
13	Washington Wizards	23	59	.280	39
14	Toronto Raptors	22	60	.268	40
15	Cleveland Cavaliers	19	63	.232	43

=== Game log ===
2010–11 game log
Total: 52–30 (home: 29–12; road: 23–18)
October: 1–1 (home: 1–0; road: 0–1)

Game	Date	Team	Score	High points	High rebounds	High assists	Location Attendance	Record
1	October 28	Washington	W 112–83	Dwight Howard (23)	Dwight Howard (10)	Jameer Nelson (6)	Amway Center; 18,918	1–0
2	October 29	@ Miami	L 70–96	Dwight Howard (19)	Dwight Howard, Marcin Gortat (7)	Jameer Nelson, Quentin Richardson, JJ Redick, Brandon Bass, Chris Duhon (1)	American Airlines Arena; 19,600	1–1

November: 12–3 (home: 8–2; road: 4–1)

Game	Date	Team	Score	High points	High rebounds	High assists	Location Attendance	Record
3	November 3	Minnesota	W 128–86	Vince Carter (20)	Dwight Howard (16)	Jameer Nelson (9)	Amway Center; 18,846	2–1
4	November 5	New Jersey	W 105–90	Dwight Howard (30)	Dwight Howard (16)	Jameer Nelson (6)	Amway Center; 18,846	3–1
5	November 6	@ Charlotte	W 91–88	Dwight Howard, Rashard Lewis (22)	Dwight Howard (8)	Chris Duhon (9)	Time Warner Cable Arena; 18,136	4–1
6	November 8	Atlanta	W 93–89	Dwight Howard (27)	Dwight Howard (11)	Chris Duhon (4)	Amway Center; 18,846	5–1
7	November 10	Utah	L 94–104	Vince Carter (20)	Marcin Gortat (10)	Jameer Nelson (7)	Amway Center; 18,846	5–2
8	November 12	Toronto	L 106–110	Dwight Howard (25)	Dwight Howard (8)	Jameer Nelson (8)	Amway Center; 18,846	5–3
9	November 13	@ New Jersey	W 91–90	Dwight Howard (16)	Dwight Howard (10)	Chris Duhon, Jameer Nelson (4)	Prudential Center; 15,086	6–3
10	November 15	Memphis	W 89–72	Vince Carter (19)	Dwight Howard (14)	Rashard Lewis, Jameer Nelson (4)	Amway Center; 18,846	7–3
11	November 18	Phoenix	W 105–89	Dwight Howard (20)	Dwight Howard (12)	Jameer Nelson (12)	Amway Center; 18,846	8–3
12	November 20	@ Indiana	W 90–86	Dwight Howard (25)	Dwight Howard (12)	Jameer Nelson (9)	Conseco Fieldhouse; 14,583	9–3
13	November 22	@ San Antonio	L 97–106	Dwight Howard (26)	Dwight Howard (18)	Jameer Nelson (5)	AT&T Center; 17,627	9–4
14	November 24	Miami	W 104–95	Dwight Howard (24)	Dwight Howard (18)	Jameer Nelson (14)	Amway Center; 18,936	10–4
15	November 26	Cleveland	W 111–100	Dwight Howard (23)	Dwight Howard (11)	Chris Duhon (9)	Amway Center; 18,846	11–4
16	November 27	@ Washington	W 100–99	Dwight Howard (32)	Dwight Howard (11)	Jameer Nelson (4)	Verizon Center; 16,435	12–4
17	November 30	Detroit	W 90–79	Rashard Lewis (20)	Dwight Howard (14)	Jameer Nelson (9)	Amway Center; 18,846	13–4

December: 8–8 (home: 3–3; road: 5–5)

Game	Date	Team	Score	High points	High rebounds	High assists	Location Attendance	Record
18	December 1	@ Chicago	W 107–78	Jameer Nelson (24)	Dwight Howard (12)	Jameer Nelson (9)	United Center; 21,435	14–4
19	December 3	@ Detroit	W 104–91	Brandon Bass (27)	Marcin Gortat (11)	Vince Carter (9)	The Palace of Auburn Hills; 18,433	15–4
20	December 4	@ Milwaukee	L 85–96	Vince Carter (20)	Marcin Gortat (10)	Vince Carter (6)	Bradley Center; 16,218	15–5
21	December 6	Atlanta	L 74–80	Vince Carter (18)	Dwight Howard (13)	Vince Carter (3)	Amway Center; 18,846	15–6
22	December 9	@ Portland	L 83–97	Dwight Howard (39)	Dwight Howard (15)	Jameer Nelson (5)	Rose Garden; 20,219	15–7
23	December 10	@ Utah	L 105–117	Jameer Nelson (19)	Dwight Howard (12)	Jameer Nelson (10)	EnergySolutions Arena; 18,765	15–8
24	December 12	@ L.A. Clippers	W 94–85	Dwight Howard (22)	Brandon Bass (11)	Jameer Nelson (9)	Staples Center; 18,278	16–8
25	December 14	@ Denver	L 94–111	JJ Redick (29)	Dwight Howard (14)	Jameer Nelson (8)	Pepsi Center; 16,427	16–9
26	December 18	Philadelphia	L 89–97	Dwight Howard (26)	Dwight Howard (20)	Jameer Nelson (9)	Amway Center; 18,846	16–10
27	December 20	@ Atlanta	L 81–91	Dwight Howard (19)	Dwight Howard (20)	Gilbert Arenas, Jameer Nelson, Jason Richardson, Hedo Türkoğlu (3)	Philips Arena; 16,275	16–11
28	December 21	Dallas	L 99–105	Dwight Howard (26)	Dwight Howard (23)	Hedo Türkoğlu (8)	Amway Center; 19,057	16–12
29	December 23	San Antonio	W 123–101	Dwight Howard (29)	Dwight Howard (14)	Gilbert Arenas (9)	Amway Center; 18,916	17–12
30	December 25	Boston	W 86–78	Brandon Bass (21)	Dwight Howard (11)	Hedo Türkoğlu (4)	Amway Center; 19,013	18–12
31	December 27	@ New Jersey	W 104–88	Hedo Türkoğlu (20)	Dwight Howard (13)	Jameer Nelson (7)	Prudential Center; 11,514	19–12
32	December 28	@ Cleveland	W 110–95	Gilbert Arenas (22)	Gilbert Arenas, Dwight Howard, Hedo Türkoğlu (6)	Gilbert Arenas (11)	Quicken Loans Arena; 20,562	20–12
33	December 30	New York	W 112–103	Dwight Howard (24)	Dwight Howard (18)	Jameer Nelson (7)	Amway Center; 19,090	21–12

January: 10–6 (home: 6–1; road: 4–5)

Game	Date	Team	Score	High points	High rebounds	High assists	Location Attendance	Record
34	January 3	Golden State	W 110–90	Dwight Howard (22)	Dwight Howard (17)	Hedo Türkoğlu (10)	Amway Center; 18,846	22–12
35	January 5	Milwaukee	W 97–87	Dwight Howard (28)	Dwight Howard (13)	Jameer Nelson (9)	Amway Center; 18,846	23–12
36	January 7	Houston	W 110–95	Brandon Bass, Jason Richardson (18)	Dwight Howard (11)	Jameer Nelson (8)	Amway Center; 19,107	24–12
37	January 8	@ Dallas	W 117–107	Dwight Howard (23)	Dwight Howard (13)	Hedo Türkoğlu (17)	American Airlines Center; 20,178	25–12
38	January 12	@ New Orleans	L 89–92 (OT)	Dwight Howard (29)	Dwight Howard (20)	Jameer Nelson (10)	New Orleans Arena; 13,688	25–13
39	January 13	@ Oklahoma City	L 124–125	Dwight Howard (39)	Dwight Howard (18)	Hedo Türkoğlu (8)	Oklahoma City Arena; 18,203	25–14
40	January 15	@ Minnesota	W 108–99	JJ Redick, Jason Richardson (21)	Ryan Anderson (11)	Gilbert Arenas, Jameer Nelson (7)	Target Center; 17,391	26–14
41	January 17	@ Boston	L 106–109	Dwight Howard (33)	Dwight Howard (13)	Hedo Türkoğlu (7)	TD Garden; 18,624	26–15
42	January 19	Philadelphia	W 99–98 (OT)	Ryan Anderson (20)	Brandon Bass (10)	Jameer Nelson (7)	Amway Center; 18,846	27–15
43	January 21	Toronto	W 112–72	Dwight Howard (31)	Dwight Howard (19)	Jameer Nelson (8)	Amway Center; 19,047	28–15
44	January 22	@ Houston	W 118–104	Dwight Howard (22)	Dwight Howard (14)	Jameer Nelson (9)	Toyota Center; 18,052	29–15
45	January 24	Detroit	L 96–103	Ryan Anderson (21)	Dwight Howard (16)	Hedo Türkoğlu (7)	Amway Center; 19,098	29–16
46	January 26	@ Indiana	W 111–96	Dwight Howard, Jason Richardson (19)	Dwight Howard (16)	Jameer Nelson, Hedo Türkoğlu (4)	Conseco Fieldhouse; 12,164	30–16
47	January 28	@ Chicago	L 90–99	Dwight Howard (40)	Dwight Howard (15)	Jason Richardson, Hedo Türkoğlu (5)	United Center; 21,676	30–17
48	January 30	Cleveland	W 103–87	Ryan Anderson (23)	Dwight Howard (20)	Jameer Nelson (8)	Amway Center; 18,846	31–17
49	January 31	@ Memphis	L 97–100	Dwight Howard (25)	Dwight Howard (14)	Jameer Nelson (4)	FedExForum; 13,513	31–18

February: 7–4 (home: 5–3; road: 2–1)

Game	Date	Team	Score	High points	High rebounds	High assists	Location Attendance	Record
50	February 3	Miami	L 100–104	Jameer Nelson (22)	Dwight Howard (16)	Jameer Nelson (6)	Amway Center; 18,945	31–19
51	February 4	@ Washington	W 110–92	Dwight Howard (22)	Dwight Howard (15)	Jameer Nelson (11)	Verizon Center; 18,940	32–19
52	February 6	@ Boston	L 80–91	Dwight Howard (28)	Dwight Howard (13)	Hedo Türkoğlu (4)	TD Garden; 18,624	32–20
53	February 8	L.A. Clippers	W 101–85	Dwight Howard (22)	Dwight Howard (20)	Hedo Türkoğlu (7)	Amway Center; 18,987	33–20
54	February 9	@ Philadelphia	W 99–95	Dwight Howard (30)	Dwight Howard (17)	Jameer Nelson (8)	Wells Fargo Center; 12,091	34–20
55	February 11	New Orleans	L 93–99	Dwight Howard (20)	Dwight Howard (17)	Jameer Nelson, Hedo Türkoğlu (5)	Amway Center; 18,994	34–21
56	February 13	L.A. Lakers	W 89–75	Dwight Howard (31)	Dwight Howard (13)	JJ Redick(4)	Amway Center; 18,994	35–21
57	February 16	Washington	W 101–76	Dwight Howard (32)	Brandon Bass (11)	Gilbert Arenas (6)	Amway Center; 19,054	36–21
All-Star Break
58	February 23	Sacramento	L 105–111	Dwight Howard (31)	Dwight Howard (17)	Hedo Türkoğlu (8)	Amway Center; 19,146	36–22
59	February 25	Oklahoma City	W 111–88	Dwight Howard (40)	Dwight Howard (15)	Hedo Türkoğlu (10)	Amway Center; 19,011	37–22
60	February 27	Charlotte	W 100–86	Dwight Howard (20)	Dwight Howard (10)	Jameer Nelson (7)	Amway Center; 18,846	38–22

March: 9–6 (home: 3–2; road: 6–4)

Game	Date	Team	Score	High points	High rebounds	High assists	Location Attendance	Record
61	March 1	New York	W 116–110	Dwight Howard (30)	Dwight Howard (16)	Chris Duhon (5)	Amway Center; 19,131	39–22
62	March 3	@ Miami	W 99–96	Jason Richardson (24)	Dwight Howard (18)	Jameer Nelson (7)	American Airlines Arena; 19,600	40–22
63	March 4	Chicago	L 81–89	Dwight Howard (20)	Dwight Howard (10)	Jameer Nelson (6)	Amway Center; 19,207	40–23
64	March 7	Portland	L 85–89	Jason Richardson (22)	Earl Clark (9)	Jameer Nelson (4)	Amway Center; 19,001	40–24
65	March 9	@ Sacramento	W 106–102	Jameer Nelson (26)	Dwight Howard (15)	Jameer Nelson (4)	Power Balance Pavilion; 12,728	41–24
66	March 11	@ Golden State	L 120–123 (OT)	Jason Richardson (30)	Dwight Howard (21)	Jameer Nelson (8)	Oracle Arena; 19,596	41–25
67	March 13	@ Phoenix	W 111–88	Dwight Howard (26)	Dwight Howard (15)	Chris Duhon (4)	US Airways Center; 18,091	42–25
68	March 14	@ L.A. Lakers	L 84–97	Dwight Howard (22)	Dwight Howard (15)	Jameer Nelson (8)	Staples Center; 18,997	42–26
69	March 16	@ Milwaukee	W 93–89 (OT)	Dwight Howard (31)	Dwight Howard (22)	Hedo Türkoğlu (5)	Bradley Center; 13,831	43–26
70	March 18	Denver	W 85–82	Dwight Howard (16)	Dwight Howard (18)	Hedo Türkoğlu (8)	Amway Center; 19,113	44–26
71	March 21	@ Cleveland	W 97–86	Dwight Howard (28)	Dwight Howard (18)	Hedo Türkoğlu (9)	Quicken Loans Arena; 19,343	45–26
72	March 23	@ New York	W 111–99	Dwight Howard (33)	Dwight Howard, Hedo Türkoğlu (11)	Jameer Nelson, Hedo Türkoğlu (4)	Madison Square Garden; 19,763	46–26
73	March 25	New Jersey	W 95–85	Dwight Howard (21)	Dwight Howard (14)	Hedo Türkoğlu (13)	Amway Center; 19,087	47–26
74	March 28	@ New York	L 106–113 (OT)	Dwight Howard (29)	Dwight Howard (18)	Gilbert Arenas (5)	Madison Square Garden; 19,763	47–27
75	March 30	@ Atlanta	L 82–85	Jameer Nelson (20)	Dwight Howard (13)	Jameer Nelson, Hedo Türkoğlu (5)	Philips Arena; 15,114	47–28

April: 5–2 (home: 3–1; road: 2–1)

Game	Date	Team	Score	High points	High rebounds	High assists	Location Attendance	Record
76	April 1	Charlotte	W 89–77	Dwight Howard (26)	Dwight Howard (14)	Hedo Türkoğlu (7)	Amway Center; 18,969	48–28
77	April 3	@ Toronto	L 98–102	Dwight Howard (31)	Brandon Bass, Dwight Howard (9)	Jameer Nelson (7)	Air Canada Centre; 19,800	48–29
78	April 5	Milwaukee	W 78–72	Dwight Howard (18)	Dwight Howard (17)	Jameer Nelson, Hedo Türkoğlu (30	Amway Center; 18,996	49–29
79	April 6	@ Charlotte	W 111–102 (OT)	Gilbert Arenas (25)	Brandon Bass (8)	Jameer Nelson (9)	Time Warner Cable Arena; 16,234	50–29
80	April 10	Chicago	L 99–102	Ryan Anderson (28)	Ryan Anderson (10)	Jameer Nelson (11)	Amway Center; 19,181	50–30
81	April 11	@ Philadelphia	W 95–85	Dwight Howard, Jameer Nelson (19)	Ryan Anderson (14)	Jameer Nelson (7)	Wells Fargo Center; 19,139	51–30
82	April 13	Indiana	W 92–74	Ryan Anderson (14)	Dwight Howard (13)	Chris Duhon (5)	Amway Center; 19,169	52–30

2010–11 season schedule

== Playoffs ==
=== Game log ===
2011 playoff game log
First Round: 2–4 (home: 2–1; road: 0–3)

Game	Date	Team	Score	High points	High rebounds	High assists	Location Attendance	Series
1	April 16	Atlanta	L 93–103	Dwight Howard (46)	Dwight Howard (19)	Hedo Türkoğlu (5)	Amway Center; 19,108	0–1
2	April 19	Atlanta	W 88–82	Dwight Howard (33)	Dwight Howard (19)	Hedo Türkoğlu (5)	Amway Center; 19,160	1–1
3	April 22	@ Atlanta	L 84–88	Dwight Howard (21)	Dwight Howard (15)	Jameer Nelson (10)	Philips Arena; 19,865	1–2
4	April 24	@ Atlanta	L 85–88	Dwight Howard (29)	Dwight Howard (17)	Jameer Nelson (6)	Philips Arena; 19,490	1–3
5	April 26	Atlanta	W 101–76	Jason Richardson (17)	Dwight Howard (8)	Jameer Nelson (5)	Amway Center; 19,091	2–3
6	April 28	@ Atlanta	L 81–84	Dwight Howard (25)	Dwight Howard (15)	Jameer Nelson (6)	Philips Arena; 19,282	2–4

2011 playoff schedule

== Player statistics ==
=== Regular season ===
Player	POS	GP	GS	MP	REB	AST	STL	BLK	PTS	MPG	RPG	APG	SPG	BPG	PPG
Dwight Howard	C	78	78	2,935	1,098	107	107	186	1,784	37.6	14.1	1.4	1.4	2.4	22.9
Jameer Nelson	PG	76	76	2,319	226	456	75	3	997	30.5	3.0	6.0	1.0	.0	13.1
Brandon Bass	PF	76	51	1,980	424	57	27	52	854	26.1	5.6	.8	.4	.7	11.2
Ryan Anderson	PF	64	14	1,424	355	52	30	38	681	22.3	5.5	.8	.5	.6	10.6
JJ Redick	SG	59	5	1,513	113	102	29	3	593	25.6	1.9	1.7	.5	.1	10.1
Quentin Richardson	SF	57	19	955	178	38	25	5	249	16.8	3.1	.7	.4	.1	4.4
Hedo Türkoğlu^{†}	SF	56	56	1,910	256	285	54	20	640	34.1	4.6	5.1	1.0	.4	11.4
Jason Richardson^{†}	SG	55	55	1,919	220	111	66	10	766	34.9	4.0	2.0	1.2	.2	13.9
Chris Duhon	PG	51	5	774	52	118	16	2	125	15.2	1.0	2.3	.3	.0	2.5
Gilbert Arenas^{†}	PG	49	2	1,070	119	157	44	9	392	21.8	2.4	3.2	.9	.2	8.0
Earl Clark^{†}	SF	33	0	392	84	5	7	15	134	11.9	2.5	.2	.2	.5	4.1
Rashard Lewis^{†}	PF	25	25	810	106	29	22	10	304	32.4	4.2	1.2	.9	.4	12.2
Marcin Gortat^{†}	C	25	2	396	118	17	7	21	100	15.8	4.7	.7	.3	.8	4.0
Vince Carter^{†}	SG	22	22	664	90	64	20	3	333	30.2	4.1	2.9	.9	.1	15.1
Mickaël Piétrus^{†}	SF	19	0	418	50	10	10	3	127	22.0	2.6	.5	.5	.2	6.7
Malik Allen	PF	18	0	178	32	4	1	4	23	9.9	1.8	.2	.1	.2	1.3
Jason Williams^{†}	PG	16	0	171	22	24	8	0	33	10.7	1.4	1.5	.5	.0	2.1

- ^{†} Denotes player spent time with another team in the season. Stats reflect time with the Magic only.

=== Playoffs ===
Player	POS	GP	GS	MP	REB	AST	STL	BLK	PTS	MPG	RPG	APG	SPG	BPG	PPG
Dwight Howard	C	6	6	258	93	3	4	11	162	43.0	15.5	.5	.7	1.8	27.0
Jameer Nelson	PG	6	6	216	25	30	12	0	79	36.0	4.2	5.0	2.0	.0	13.2
Hedo Türkoğlu	SF	6	6	209	19	22	8	1	55	34.8	3.2	3.7	1.3	.2	9.2
Brandon Bass	PF	6	6	139	25	2	3	5	44	23.2	4.2	.3	.5	.8	7.3
Quentin Richardson	SF	6	1	98	15	2	1	1	23	16.3	2.5	.3	.2	.2	3.8
Ryan Anderson	PF	6	0	147	27	3	5	1	28	24.5	4.5	.5	.8	.2	4.7
JJ Redick	SG	6	0	120	11	6	1	1	40	20.0	1.8	1.0	.2	.2	6.7
Jason Richardson	SG	5	5	153	20	6	3	2	50	30.6	4.0	1.2	.6	.4	10.0
Gilbert Arenas	PG	5	0	81	14	12	1	1	43	16.2	2.8	2.4	.2	.2	8.6
Malik Allen	PF	1	0	7	1	0	0	0	1	7.0	1.0	.0	.0	.0	1.0
Earl Clark	SF	1	0	6	4	1	1	1	2	6.0	4.0	1.0	1.0	1.0	2.0
Chris Duhon	PG	1	0	4	0	0	0	0	5	4.0	.0	.0	.0	.0	5.0

== Awards, records and milestones ==
=== Awards and honors ===
- Dwight Howard – Defensive Player of the Year, All-NBA 1st Team, All-Defensive 1st Team, All-Star

==== Week/Month ====
Week	Player	Ref.
Nov. 1 – Nov. 7	Dwight Howard	
Nov. 22 – Nov. 28	Dwight Howard	
Jan. 17 – Jan. 23	Dwight Howard	
Feb. 7 – Feb. 13	Dwight Howard	
Feb. 21 – Feb. 27	Dwight Howard	
Mar. 21 – Mar. 27	Dwight Howard	

Month	Player	Ref.
November	Dwight Howard	
February	Dwight Howard	

== Suspensions ==
Dwight Howard was suspended by the NBA from the game on March 7 after accumulating 16 technical fouls.

Dwight Howard was suspended by the NBA from the game on April 10 after accumulating 18 technical fouls.

Quentin Richardson was suspended by the NBA for 2 games (April 10 and 11) for shoving Gerald Henderson during the game against the Bobcats on April 6.

== Injuries and surgeries ==
Point guard Jameer Nelson went down with a sprained left ankle on November 5. The injury caused him to miss two games, as he returned to the starting lineup less than a week later on November 10.

Shooting guard Vince Carter went down with a knee injury on November 22. He missed three games but returned a week later on November 30.

A stomach virus affected several Orlando players from December 1–9. JJ Redick, Mickaël Piétrus, Dwight Howard, Jameer Nelson, and were all affected. Redick, Pietrus, and Howard were out until December 6, while Nelson did not return until December 9. Ryan Anderson contracted the illness as well, however he had suffered a sprained foot on November 6 which also kept him out of action.

== Transactions ==
=== Trades ===
December 18, 2010
December 18, 2010
To Washington Wizards

- (United States) Rashard Lewis
To Phoenix Suns

- (United States) Vince Carter
- (Poland) Marcin Gortat
- (France) Mickaël Piétrus
- 2011 first-round draft pick
- Cash considerations
To Orlando Magic

- (United States) Gilbert Arenas
To Orlando Magic

- (United States) Jason Richardson
- (Turkey) Hedo Türkoğlu
- (United States) Earl Clark
