= Fat lady sings =

"Fat lady sings" can mean:

- Part of the phrase "It ain't over 'til the fat lady sings".
- The early 1990s Irish band Fat Lady Sings.
