= Washington Wizards =

National Basketball Association team in Washington, D.C.

- 2026–27 Washington Wizards season
- Conference: Eastern
- Division: Southeast
- Founded: 1961
- History: Chicago Packers; 1961–1962; Chicago Zephyrs; 1962–1963; Baltimore Bullets; 1963–1973; Capital Bullets; 1973–1974; Washington Bullets; 1974–1997; Washington Wizards; 1997–present
- Arena: Capital One Arena
- Location: Washington, D.C.
- Team colors: Navy blue, red, silver, white
- Main sponsor: Robinhood
- President: Michael Winger
- General manager: Will Dawkins
- Head coach: Brian Keefe
- Ownership: Monumental Sports & Entertainment (Ted Leonsis)
- Affiliation: Capital City Go-Go
- Championships: 1 (1978)
- Conference titles: 4 (1971, 1975, 1978, 1979)
- Division titles: 8 (1969, 1971, 1972, 1973, 1974, 1975, 1979, 2017)
- Retired numbers: 5 (10, 11, 25, 41, 45)
- Website: nba.com/wizards
Association	Icon	Statement

The Washington Wizards are an American professional basketball team based in Washington, D.C. The Wizards compete in the National Basketball Association (NBA) as a member of the Southeast Division of the Eastern Conference. The team plays its home games at Capital One Arena, in the Chinatown neighborhood of Washington, D.C., an arena they share with the Washington Capitals of the National Hockey League (NHL) and the Georgetown University men's basketball team. The team is owned by Ted Leonsis through Monumental Sports & Entertainment.

The franchise was established in 1961 as the Chicago Packers in Chicago; they were renamed the Chicago Zephyrs in the following season. In 1963, they moved to Baltimore, and became the Baltimore Bullets, taking the name from a previous team of the same name. In 1973, the team moved to the Washington metropolitan area and changed its name first to the Capital Bullets, then the following season to Washington Bullets. In 1997, they rebranded themselves as the Wizards.

The franchise has played in four NBA Finals, winning in 1978. They have appeared in 28 playoffs, won four conference titles (1971, 1975, 1978, 1979), and won eight division titles (1969, 1971, 1972, 1973, 1974, 1975, 1979, 2017). Their best season record, in 1974–75, was 60–22. Wes Unseld is the only player in franchise history to be named NBA MVP (1969) and Finals MVP (1978). Four players (Walt Bellamy, Terry Dischinger, Earl Monroe, and Unseld) have won the Rookie of the Year award. Unseld won both league MVP and Rookie of the Year in the same season.

== History ==
=== Team creation ===
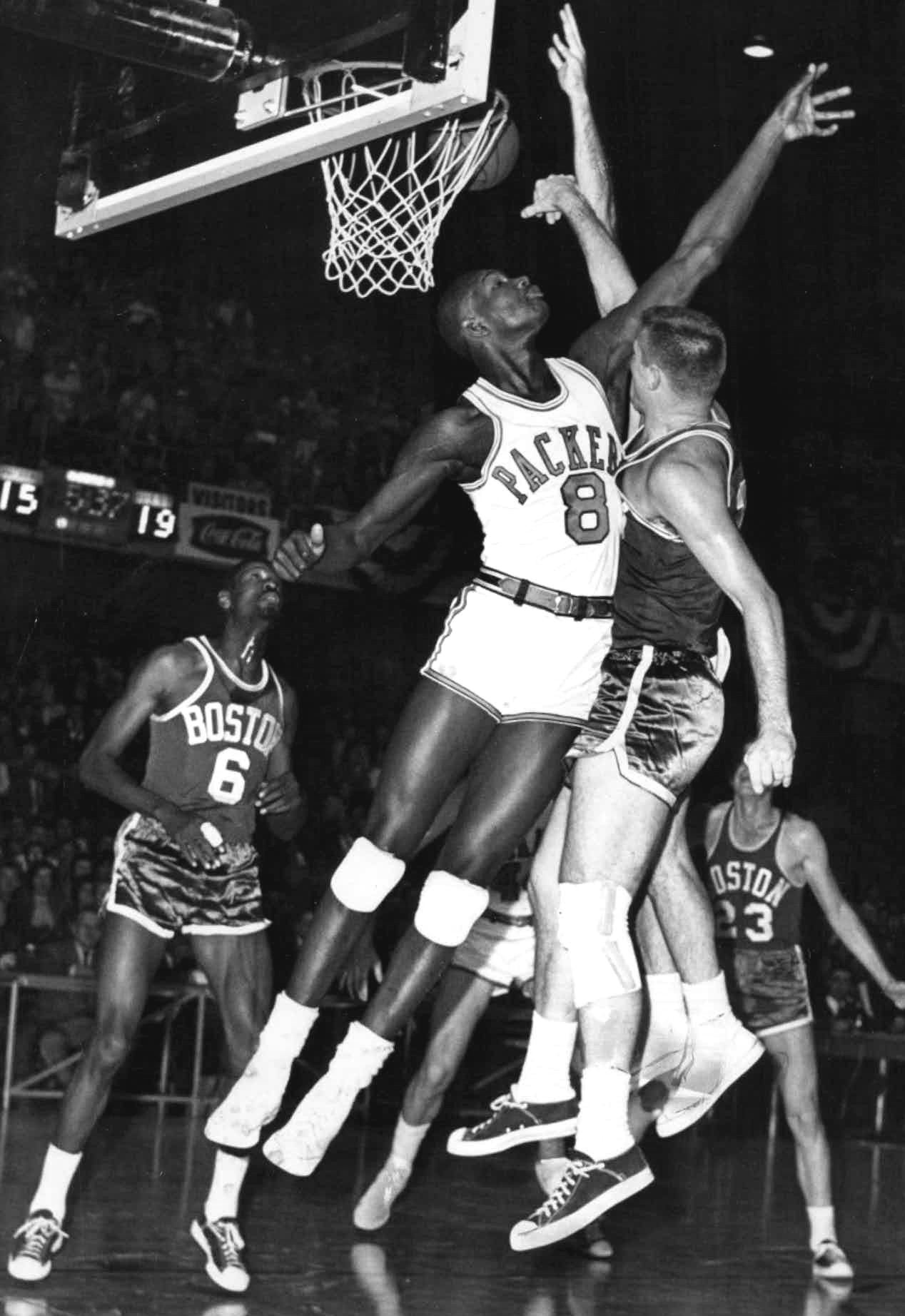
Bellamy (No. 8) averaged 31.6 points per game and 19.0 rebounds per game during his rookie season

The Wizards began playing as the Chicago Packers in 1961, as the NBA's first expansion team, an expansion prompted by Abe Saperstein's American Basketball League. Rookie Walt Bellamy was the team's star, averaging 31.6 points per game, 19.0 rebounds per game, and leading the NBA in field goal percentage. During the All-Star Game, Bellamy represented the team while scoring 23 points and grabbing 17 rebounds. Bellamy was named the league Rookie of the Year, but the team finished with the NBA's worst record at 18–62.

The team's original name was a reference to Chicago's meatpacking industry; their home arena, the International Amphitheater, was next door to the Union Stock Yards. However, it was extremely unpopular since it was the same name used by the NFL's Green Bay Packers, bitter rivals of the Chicago Bears. After only one year, the organization changed its name to the Chicago Zephyrs and played its home games at the Chicago Coliseum (Saperstein's ABL Majors prevented the team from playing in the larger Chicago Stadium). In their only season as the Zephyrs, former Purdue star Terry Dischinger was on the roster, and went on to win Rookie of the Year honors. In 1963 the franchise moved to Baltimore, and became the Baltimore Bullets, taking their name from a 1940s–1950s Baltimore Bullets BAA/NBA franchise and playing their home games at the Baltimore Civic Center. The NBA returned to Chicago in 1966 when the Chicago Bulls began play. In their first year in Baltimore, the Bullets finished fourth in a five–team Western Division.

Before the 1964–65 season, the Bullets pulled off a blockbuster trade, sending Dischinger, Rod Thorn and Don Kojis to the Detroit Pistons for Bailey Howell, Don Ohl, Bob Ferry and Wali Jones. The trade worked out well; Howell proved to be a hustler and a fundamentally sound player. He helped the Bullets reach the playoffs for the first time in franchise history. In the 1965 NBA playoffs, the Bullets stunned the St. Louis Hawks 3–1, and advanced to the Western Conference finals. In the finals, Baltimore managed to split the first four games with the Los Angeles Lakers before losing the series 4–2.

Within the first two months of that season, the Bullets were purchased from original franchise managing partner Dave Trager by Abe Pollin, Earl Foreman and real estate investor and former NBA referee Arnold Heft for $1.1 million, on November 23, 1964.

=== 1967–1981: The Wes Unseld era ===
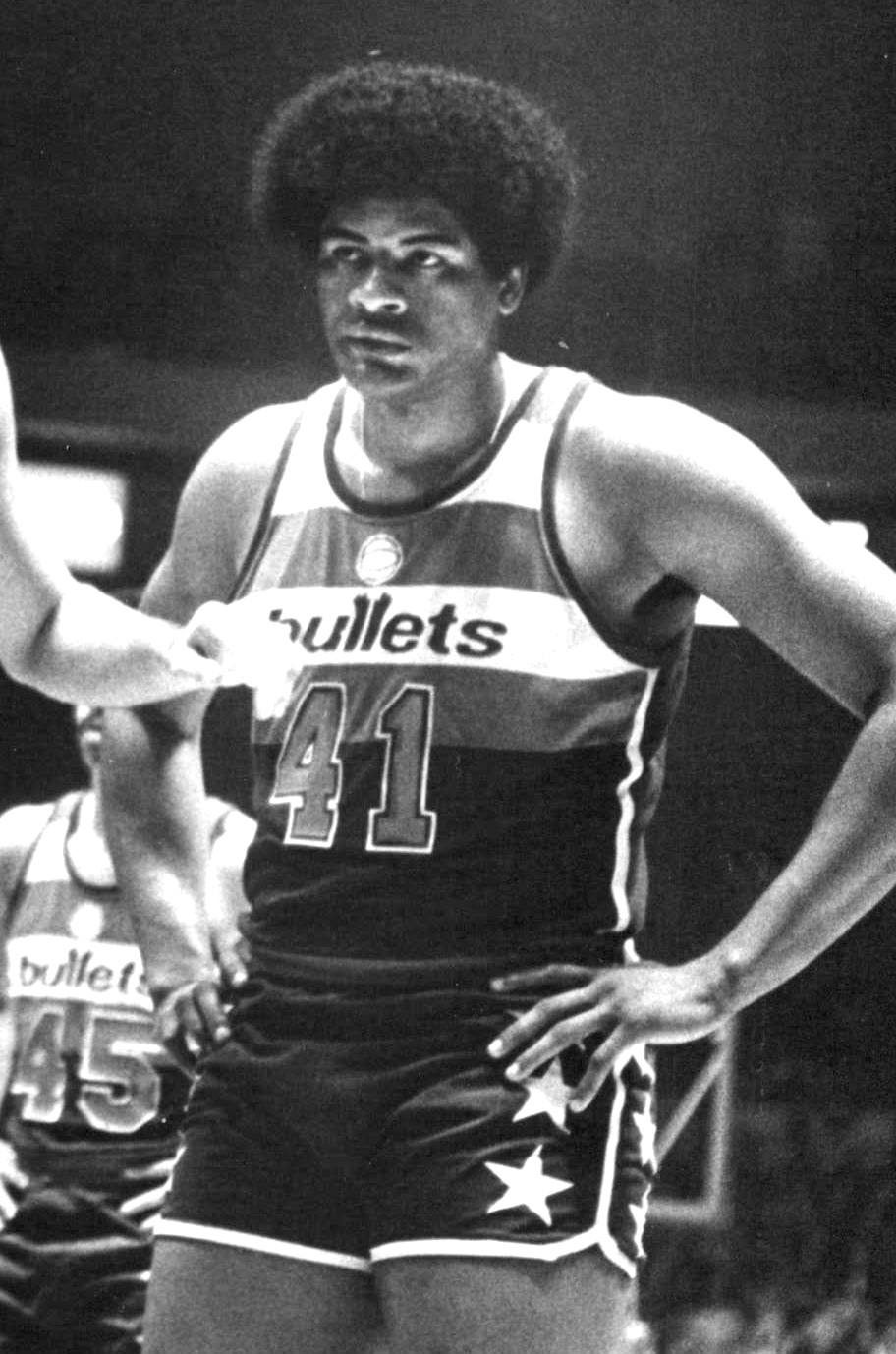
Wes Unseld, who won the NBA Rookie of the Year, NBA Regular Season MVP, and NBA Finals MVP awards, played all 13 seasons of his career with the Bullets.

In the late 1960s, the Bullets drafted two future Hall of Fame members: Earl Monroe, in the 1967 draft, number two overall, and Wes Unseld, in the following year's draft, also number two overall. The team improved dramatically, from 36 wins the previous season to 57 in the 1968–69 season, and Unseld received both the rookie of the year and MVP awards. The Bullets hosted the 1969 NBA All-Star Game and reached the playoffs with high expectations, but they were eliminated by the New York Knicks in the first round. The next season the two teams met again in the first round, and although this one went to seven games, the Knicks emerged victorious again.

In the 1970–71 season, the 42–40 Bullets again met the Knicks, this time though in the Eastern Conference finals. With the Knicks team captain Willis Reed injured in the finals, the injury-free Bullets took advantage of his absence, and in game seven, at New York's Madison Square Garden, the Bullets' Gus Johnson made a critical basket late in the game to lift the Bullets over the Knicks 93–91 and advance to their first NBA Finals. They were swept in four games by the powerful Milwaukee Bucks led by future Hall of Fame members Kareem Abdul-Jabbar (known in 1971 as Lew Alcindor) and Oscar Robertson.

Even after the trades of Earl Monroe (to the Knicks) and Gus Johnson (to the Suns), the Bullets remained a playoff contender throughout the 1970s. After a less-than-spectacular 1971–72 season, Baltimore acquired Elvin Hayes from the Houston Rockets and drafted Kevin Porter in the third round of the 1972 NBA draft, out of St. Francis.

After a slow start in 1972–73, Baltimore made their charge in December, posting a 10–4 record on the way to capturing the Central Division title for the third straight year. The Bullets again faced the Knicks in the 1973 NBA playoffs, losing for the fourth time in five series against New York.

==== Move to Washington, D.C. area ====
In February 1973, the team announced its pending move 30 miles (50 km) southwest to the Capital Centre in Landover, a Washington, D.C. suburb, and became the Capital Bullets. After that 1973–74 season, they changed their geographic identifier name to the Washington Bullets. The Bullets would return to Baltimore to play a few home games per season during the late 1980s and 1990s.

During November 1973, while waiting for the completion of their new arena in Landover, the Bullets played their home games at Cole Field House on the campus of the University of Maryland in College Park. The Capital Centre (later known as the US Airways Arena) opened on December 2, 1973, with the Bullets defeating the SuperSonics.

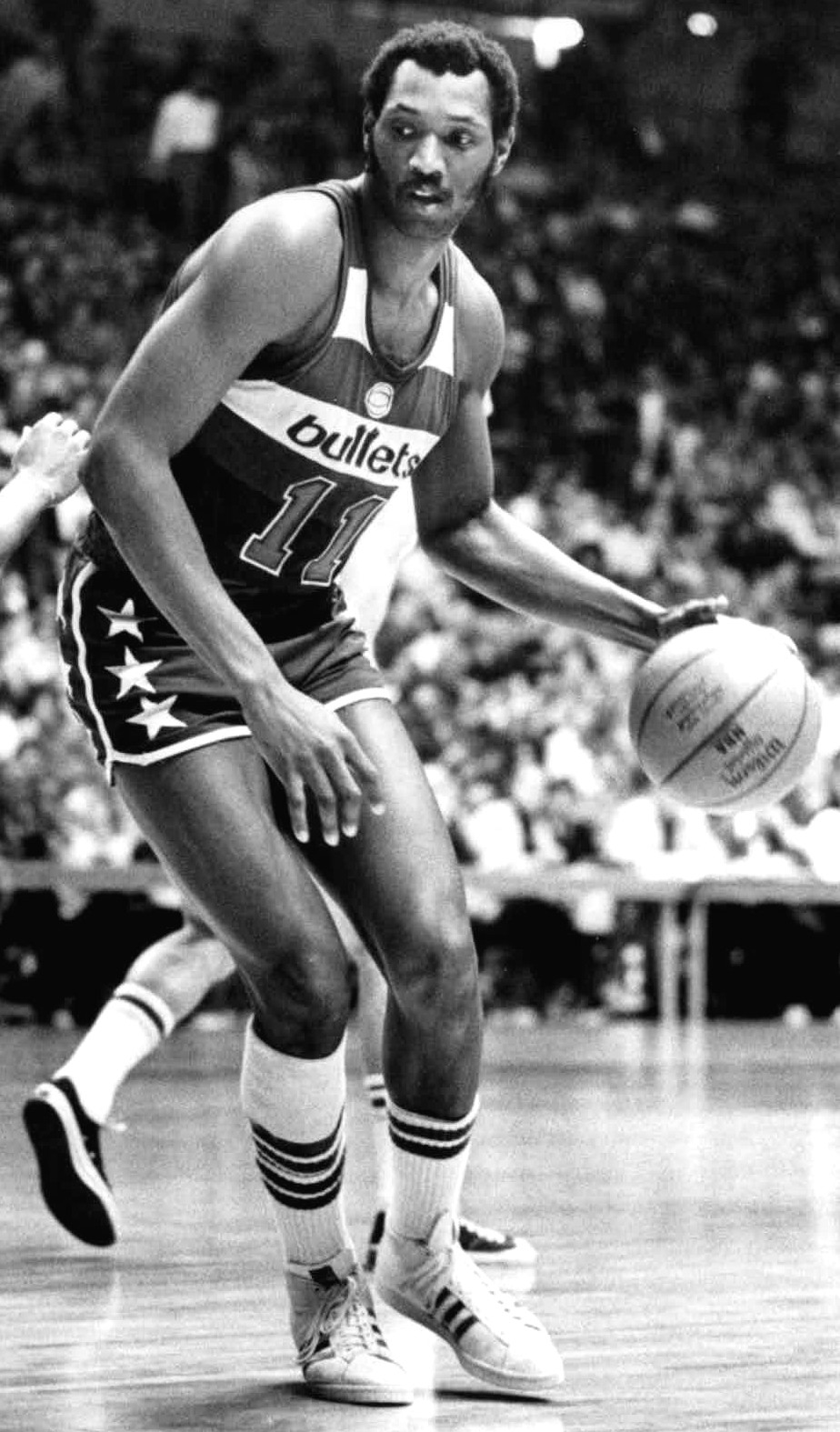
During his nine seasons with the Bullets, Elvin Hayes averaged 21.3 points per game and 12.7 rebounds per game. He led the NBA in rebounding in the 1973–74 season with an average of 18.1 rebounds per game.

The 60–22 Bullets made it back to the 1975 NBA playoffs. In the regular season, Washington posted a 36–5 home record at the Capital Centre. In the first round of the playoffs, they survived a seven-game series against the Buffalo Braves as both teams won all of their games at home. In the Eastern Conference finals, they beat the defending NBA champion Boston Celtics in six games to advance to the NBA Finals. The Bullets were favorites to win the NBA championship, but were swept by the Al Attles-led Golden State Warriors in four games, losing games one and four at the Capital Centre.

The loss at the NBA Finals lingered into the 1975–76 season, as they won 12 fewer games than the previous year, and in the playoffs they were eliminated by the Cleveland Cavaliers in seven games. After the season, the Bullets fired head coach K.C. Jones, despite having a career 62 percent winning percentage as the Bullets head coach.

In 1976–77, under new head coach Dick Motta, the Bullets again fell short of the Central Division title for the second straight year. Elvin Hayes finished sixth in the league in rebounds with 12.5 rebounds per game. After opening the 1977 NBA playoffs with a three-game series victory over the Cleveland Cavaliers, the Bullets took a 2–1 series lead in the second round against the Houston Rockets. With a chance to take a 3–1 series lead at home, the Bullets lost 107–103, and the Rockets took the series in six games.

==== 1977–78: NBA championship season ====
Although they had future hall of famers Elvin Hayes and Wes Unseld on the team, the Bullets finished the 1977–78 season 44–38 and were a longshot to win the NBA Finals, but San Antonio journalist Dan Cook used the famed phrase "It ain't over 'til the fat lady sings". This became the rallying cry for the Bullets as they finished a playoff run that led to the NBA Finals, defeating the Seattle SuperSonics in seven games to bring a professional sports championship to Washington, D.C. for the first time in 36 years. It remains the only NBA title won by the team as of 2026.

==== 1978–79: Finalists ====
In the 1978–79 season the Bullets moved to the Atlantic Division, capturing the title in their first season there. They entered the 1979 NBA playoffs having lost eight of the final 11 games to finish the regular season at 54–28. This would be their most recent 50-win season as of 2025. In the playoffs the Bullets nearly blew a 3–1 series lead against the Atlanta Hawks, but managed to hold off the Hawks in seven games.

In the Eastern Conference finals, they trailed the San Antonio Spurs 3–1, but they mounted a comeback by winning two straight games to force a game seven at the Capital Centre. The Bullets rallied again, overcoming a fourth–quarter deficit to beat George Gervin and the Spurs 107–105 in one of the NBA's all-time greatest games and advance to the NBA Finals and a rematch with the Seattle SuperSonics.

In Game 1 of the finals, the Bullets defeated the SuperSonics, 99–97, on two game-winning free throws. They lost the next four games, and the series, to Seattle. The Bullets were the only team to play in the NBA Finals four times during the 1970s.

=== 1979–1988: Playoff disappointments ===
In August 1979, the Bullets became the first NBA team to visit China, where they defeated the Bayi Rockets and the Shanghai Sharks.

Age and injuries finally caught up with the Bullets. In the 1979–80 season, they barely made the playoffs as they captured the sixth and final playoff spot via a tiebreaker despite posting a 39–43 record. In the playoffs, they were swept by the Philadelphia 76ers in a two-game playoff series. The following year the Bullets failed to make the playoffs for the first time in 13 years. Wes Unseld retired and Elvin Hayes was traded back to the Houston Rockets the following season.

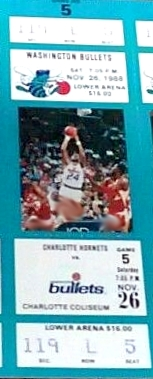
A ticket for a 1988–89 game between the Bullets and the Hornets.

In 1981–82, Washington played strong under the coaching of Gene Shue and Don Moran, finishing the regular season with a 43–39 record, and although they advanced to the Eastern Conference semifinals in the playoffs, they had clearly lost the power of the late 1970s. The 1983 Bullets continued to play with the same talent they had in the previous year. They finished with a winning record, but in a highly competitive Atlantic Division they finished last and missed the playoffs.

The next two years saw the Bullets continue to play mediocre basketball as they finished with losing records but they made the playoffs in the new expanded NBA playoffs format that involved the 16 best teams to make the playoffs; the Bullets were eliminated in both years in the first round.

In 1985, the Bullets acquired Manute Bol in the 1985 NBA draft, whose specialty was blocking shots. That year, he blocked 397 shots (a Bullets record), part of a team that blocked 716 shots (a Bullets team record). However, the Bullets finished with a disappointing 39–43 record, and were eliminated by the 76ers in the first round of the NBA playoffs. The Bullets acquired center Moses Malone from the Philadelphia 76ers for center Jeff Ruland the following season for hope of improvement. Malone would lead the team in scoring with a 24.1 points per game as he would be joined by Jeff Malone who averaged 22.0 points per game. The Bullets' 42–40 record would be their last winning season until 1996–97. Washington was eliminated by the Detroit Pistons in three games in the playoffs.

Twelfth overall in the 1987 NBA draft, the Bullets selected Muggsy Bogues, who at 5 feet 3 inches (160 cm) is the shortest player in NBA history. The Bullets would get off to a slow start as coach Kevin Loughery was fired 27 games into the season with the Bullets holding an 8–19 record. To replace Loughery, the Bullets hired former MVP Wes Unseld. Under Unseld, the Bullets improved as they were able to reach the playoffs again with a record of 38–44. After losing the first two games on the road in the first round of the 1988 NBA playoffs to the Detroit Pistons, the Bullets fought back and forced a fifth game with two home wins. They would lose game 5 by 21 points. It would be nine seasons before Washington would return to the NBA Playoffs.

=== 1989–1997: End of the Bullets ===
The Bullets got off to a 5–1 start in 1988–89, but they lost 16 of 18 games from mid-December to mid-January. On January 6, 1989, the Bullets franchise played its first regular season game in Baltimore since 1973; this would be the first of 35 regular season "home" games the Bullets played in Baltimore from 1989 to 1997. They finished with a 31–51 record despite stellar seasons by Jeff Malone and Bernard King, who averaged 24.3 and 22.3 points per game respectively to lead the team.

The lone highlight of the Bullets' 30-win 1990–91 season was the successful comeback effort by Bernard King as he recovered from knee surgery he suffered while playing for the Knicks in the 1984–85 season to finish third in the NBA in scoring with a 28.4 points per game. In 1990, the team named Susan O'Malley as its president, the first female president of a franchise in the history of the NBA, who is the daughter of Peter O'Malley, the prominent lawyer from Maryland and former president of the Washington Capitals.

The Bullets continued to struggle due to injuries and inconsistent play. They posted a 25–57 record in the 1991–92 season. Pervis Ellison was named 1992 Most Improved Player of The Year, averaging 20.0 points, 11.2 rebounds, and 2.7 blocks per game. Undrafted rookie Larry Stewart became the first undrafted player in NBA history to make an All-Rookie Team, being selected to the All-Rookie Second Team. The Bullets drafted Tom Gugliotta with their sixth overall pick in the 1992 NBA draft. They finished the 1992–93 season with a 22–60 record. After the season, the Bullets traded Harvey Grant to the Portland Trail Blazers for former All-Star center Kevin Duckworth. In 1993, the Bullets did a rap music video of their version of Naughty by Nature's rap single "Hip Hop Hooray", featuring the rap trio themselves.

Injuries continued as key players Rex Chapman and Calbert Cheaney (the club's first-round draft pick) missed significant stretches, and Ellison missed almost the entire season. The result was a 24–58 record for the 1993–94 season. Don MacLean was named 1994 Most Improved Player of the season, leading the Bullets with 18.2 points per game (tied with Chapman).

The Bullets selected Juwan Howard in the 1994 NBA draft and traded Gugliotta along with three first-round draft picks to the Golden State Warriors for the rights to Chris Webber. While the season started out with promise, a shoulder injury to Chris Webber (ironically against the Warriors) caused him to miss 19 games, and the Bullets struggled through the rest of the season finishing a then franchise-worst (percentage-wise) 21–61. Webber averaged 20.1 points and 9.6 rebounds per game, but declined surgery for his dislocated shoulder. This would prove costly for the next season. The Bullets released a holiday video, "You da Man, You da Man, that's the reason I'm a Bullets Fan!" in 1994, which featured all 12 Bullets dancing in front of the Reflecting Pool in Washington, D.C.

In the Bullets' 1995–96 season Webber suffered a dislocated left shoulder in a preseason game against the Indiana Pacers on October 21, and opened the season on the injured list. He was activated on November 27, but strained his shoulder against the New York Knicks on December 29. After hoping the injury would get better with rest, Webber finally underwent surgery on Feb 1 which sidelined him for the remainder of the season. The Bullets were 9–6 with Webber in the lineup as he averaged a team-high 23.7 points plus 7.6 rebounds, 5.0 assists and 1.80 steals in 37.2 minutes per game when he was able to play. Other players injured included Mark Price (who only played in seven games) and Robert Pack (31 games played out of 82). Bright spots of the season included the selection of Rasheed Wallace in the 1995 NBA draft and the All-Star play of Howard. Howard averaged a career-best 22.1 ppg and 8.1 rpg and kept the Bullets slim playoff hopes alive until the end of the season. Center Gheorghe Mureșan was named Most Improved Player of The Year, averaging 14.5 points, 9.6 rebounds, and 2.3 blocks. The Bullets improved to 39–43 but just missed the playoffs for the eighth consecutive season.

Washington, boasting the league's tallest player (Mureșan, whose height is 7 feet 7 inches or 231 centimetres), two very athletic forwards (Howard and Webber) and one of the league's top point guards (Rod Strickland), started the 1996–97 season at 22–24. That led to the dismissal of head coach Jim Lynam. Bernie Bickerstaff, an assistant coach with the Bullets when they won their only NBA championship in 1978, was called upon to resurrect his former team. The Bullets responded, winning 16 of their final 21 games to finish 44–38, their best record since 1978–79. The late surge enabled the Bullets to climb within reach of the Cleveland Cavaliers for the final playoff spot in the Eastern Conference. In a win-or-go-home game with the Cavaliers on the season's final day, the Bullets squeezed past Cleveland 85–81 to end the franchise's longest playoff drought. Whilst the Bullets were swept by the Bulls in the first round, they lost the three games by a total of 18 points.

Webber led the way in scoring (20.1 ppg), rebounding (10.3) and blocks (1.9) and shot 51.8 percent from the floor to make his first All-Star team. Howard averaged 19.1 ppg and 8.0 rpg, while Strickland averaged 17.2 ppg and 1.74 spg and finished fifth in the league in assists with 8.9 per game. Mureşan dominated the middle and led the NBA in field goal percentage (.599). Washington received contributions from Calbert Cheaney (10.6 ppg) and Tracy Murray (10.0 ppg).

==== Becoming the Wizards ====
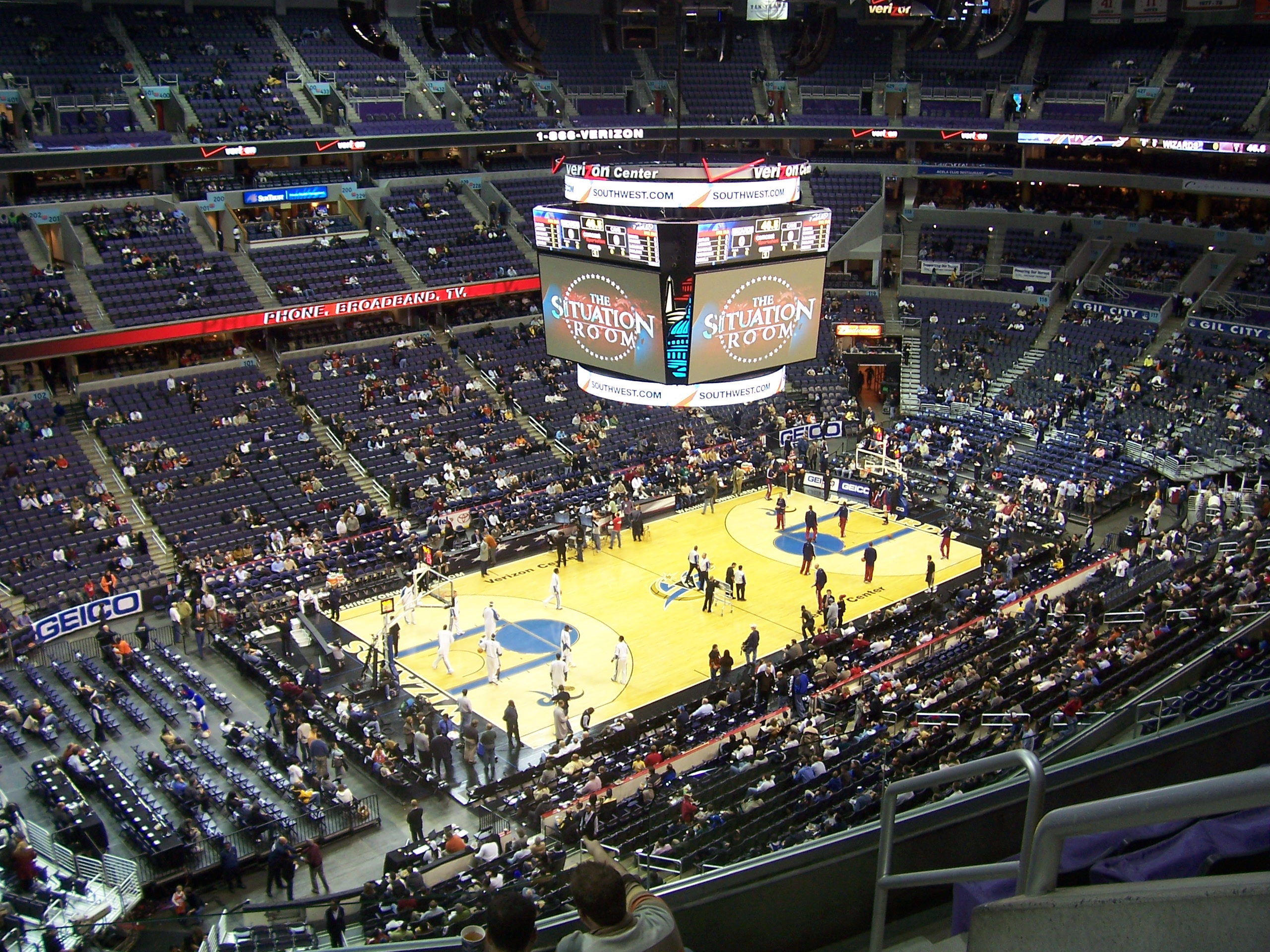
The Wizards moved to the MCI Center (later Verizon Center and then Capital One Arena) in 1997.

In November 1995, owner Abe Pollin announced that he would change the team's name because "Bullets" had acquired violent overtones that had made him increasingly uncomfortable over the years, particularly given the high homicide and crime rate in the early 1990s in Washington, D.C., and the recent assassination of Pollin's longtime friend, Israeli prime minister Yitzhak Rabin. Pollin said, "If I save one life, make a change in one life, it’ll be worth it." Newspaper coverage also noted that a name change could boost sales of team merchandise, which was selling poorly.

Team officials invited the public to suggest names, then said they had narrowed the field to Dragons, Express, Stallions, Sea Dogs, and the Wizards. The public was encouraged to vote for their favorite via a 1-900 number whose revenue was given to charity. In a process noted for its lack of transparency, Pollin announced that the new team name would be "Wizards".

On May 15, 1997, the Bullets officially became the Wizards. The new name generated some controversy because "wizard" is a rank in the Ku Klux Klan, and Washington has a large African American population. A new logo was unveiled and the team colors were changed from the traditional red, white and blue to a lighter shade of blue, black and bronze, the same colors as the Washington Capitals of the National Hockey League (NHL), also owned by Pollin and changed from red, white and blue before the 1995–96 season. Washington forward Juwan Howard sat on the committee that decided on the logo design. That same year the Wizards moved to the then MCI Center (Capital One Arena), also home to the Capitals and the Georgetown Hoyas men's college basketball team.

In 1998, they became the brother team to the Washington Mystics of the Women's National Basketball Association, and remained officially thus until 2005 when the Mystics were sold to Lincoln Holdings (headed by Ted Leonsis), parent company of the Capitals. However, upon the purchase of the Wizards by Leonsis in 2010, the Wizards and Mystics again became sibling teams.

=== 1997–2001: Rebranded as the Wizards ===
The renamed Wizards began the 1997–98 season playing five home games at the Capital Centre before moving to the new MCI Center on December 2, 1997. The Wizards finished the season with a 42–40 record including four straight victories to end the season but just missed the playoffs. Highlights of the season included Chris Webber leading the team in scoring (21.9 ppg) and rebounding (9.5 rpg). Strickland led the league in assists (10.5 apg) before suffering an injury near the end of the season. He was also named on the All-NBA Second Team. Tracy Murray averaged 15.1 ppg off the bench including a 50-point game against Golden State. Off-court distractions led to the trade of Webber to the Sacramento Kings for Mitch Richmond and Otis Thorpe in May 1998.

The Wizards finished the lockout-shortened season of 1998–99 with a record of 18–32. Mitch Richmond led the team in scoring with a 19.7 ppg average. In the 1999–2000 season, the Wizards finished with a 29–53 record. Mitch Richmond led the team with 17.4 ppg. In the 2000–01 season, under newly hired coach Leonard Hamilton, 1999 NBA draft pick Richard Hamilton led the team in scoring with 18.1 ppg, but the team finished with a 19–63 record, the most losses the team had ever suffered in one season.

On February 23, 2001, the Wizards were involved in a blockbuster trade days before the trading deadline. The team sent Juwan Howard, Obinna Ekezie and Calvin Booth to the Dallas Mavericks. In return, Washington received Hubert Davis, Courtney Alexander, Christian Laettner, Loy Vaught and Etan Thomas along with $3 million.

=== 2001–2003: The Michael Jordan era ===
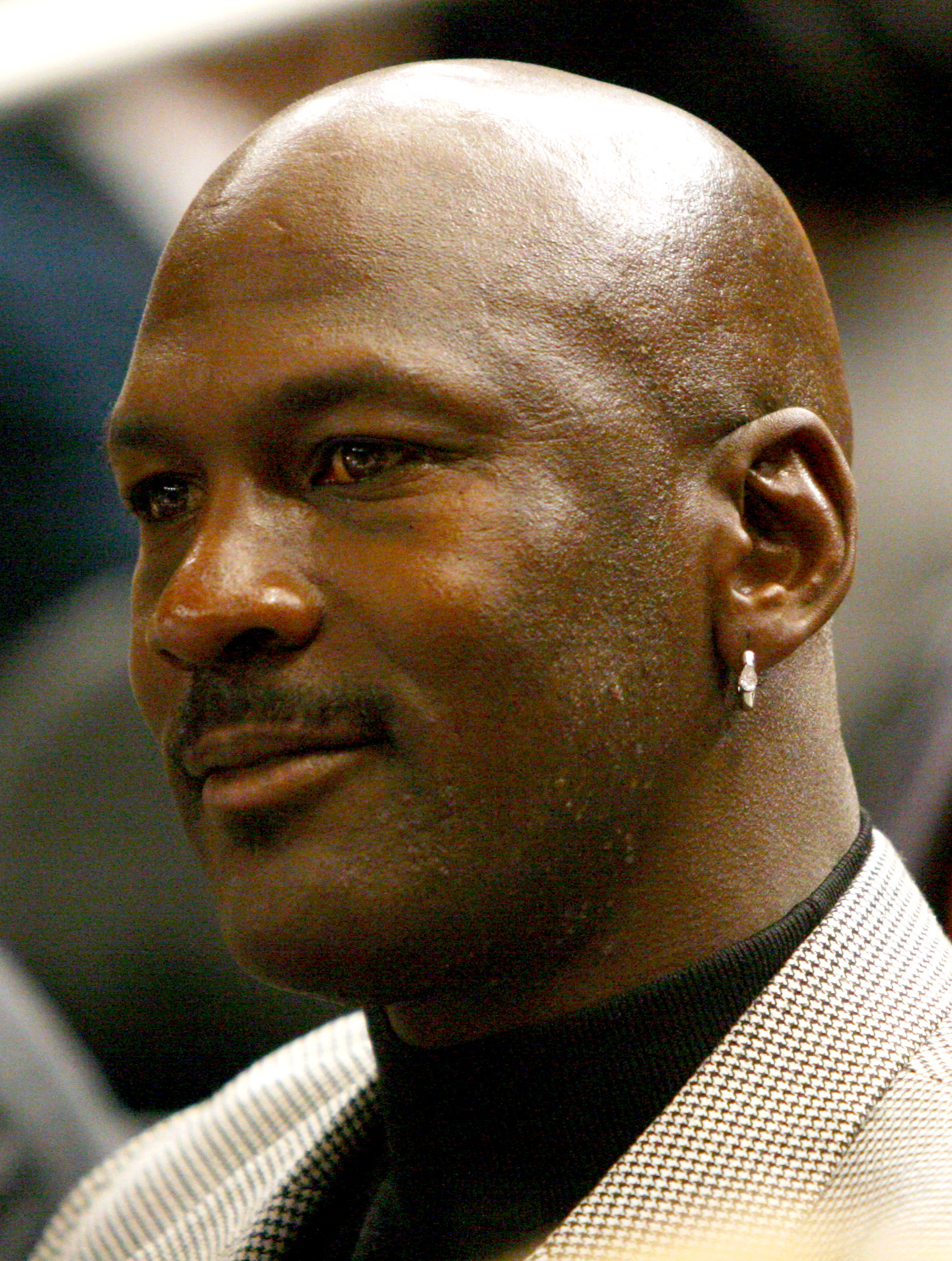
Michael Jordan served as president of basketball operations and was a minority owner.

==== 2001–02 season ====
After retiring from the Chicago Bulls in early 1999, Michael Jordan became the Washington Wizards' president of basketball operations as well as a minority owner in January 2000. In September 2001, Jordan came out of retirement at age 38 to play for Washington. Jordan stated that he was returning "for the love of the game". Because of NBA rules, he had to divest himself of any ownership of the team. Before the All-Star break, Jordan was one of only two players to average more than 25 points, 5 assists, and 5 rebounds as he led the Wizards to a 26–21 record. After the All-Star break, Jordan's knee could not handle the workload of a full-season as he ended the season on the injured list, and the Wizards concluded the season with a 37–45 record but could not make the Eastern Conference playoffs.

==== 2002–03 season ====
Jordan announced he would return for the 2002–03 season, and this time he was determined to be equipped with reinforcements, as he traded for All-Star Jerry Stackhouse and signed budding star Larry Hughes. Jordan even accepted a sixth-man role on the bench in order for his knee to survive the rigors of an 82-game season. A combination of numerous team injuries and uninspired play led to Jordan's return to the starting lineup, where he tried to rebound the franchise from its early-season struggles. By the end of the season, the Wizards finished with a 37–45 record once again. Jordan ended the season as the only Wizard to play in all 82 games, as he averaged 20.0 points, 6.9 rebounds, 3.8 assists, and 1.5 steals in 37.0 minutes per game. Jordan retired from playing for a third and final time after the season.

==== Jordan's departure ====
After the season, majority owner Pollin fired Jordan as team president, much to the shock of players, associates, and the public. Jordan felt betrayed, thinking that he would get his ownership back after his playing days ended, but Pollin justified Jordan's dismissal by noting that Jordan had detrimental effects on the team, such as benching Hughes for Tyronn Lue, making poor trades, and using the team's first-round draft pick on high schooler Kwame Brown. The Wizards replaced Jordan's managerial role with general manager Ernie Grunfeld.

=== 2003–2010: The Gilbert Arenas era ===
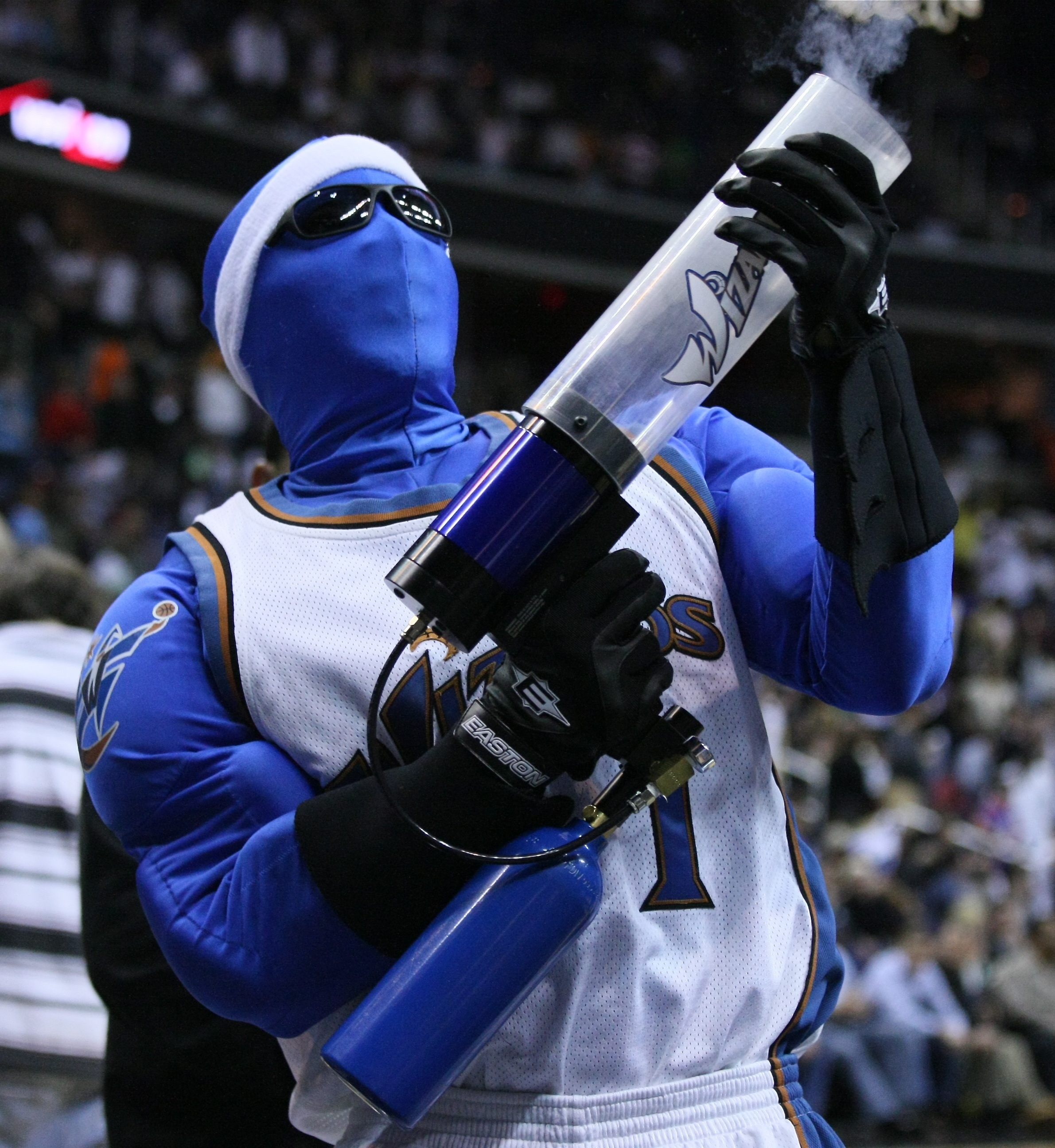
The Wizards G-Man, one of the team's mascots

==== 2003–04: The arrival of Gilbert Arenas ====
Without Jordan in the fold, the Washington Wizards were not expected to win in the 2003–04 season, and they did not. The team signed future All-Star point guard Gilbert Arenas, a move enabled by Jordan's previous cap-clearing maneuvers as a team executive, but stumbled to a 25–57 record.

==== 2004–05: Return to the playoffs ====
In the off-season, the team traded Stackhouse, Christian Laettner, and the draft rights to Devin Harris to the Dallas Mavericks for Antawn Jamison. During the regular season, Arenas, Jamison and Hughes were the highest-scoring trio in the NBA and earned the nickname of "The Big Three". Hughes led the NBA in steals with 2.89 per game. Arenas and Jamison were named to the 2005 Eastern Conference All-Star team, the first time Washington had two players in the All-Star game since Jeff Malone and Moses Malone represented the Bullets in the 1987 All-Star Game.

The 2004–05 season saw the team (now in the new Southeast Division) post its best regular season record in 26 years (45–37) and make the playoffs for the first time as the Wizards. With a 93–82 win over the Chicago Bulls on April 13, 2005, the Wizards clinched a playoff spot for the first time since 1996–97. Long-suffering fans celebrated by buying over 16,000 playoff tickets in two and a half hours the day tickets went on sale. In game three of the first round against the Bulls, the Wizards won their first playoff game since 1988. Adding to the "long-overdue" feeling was that game three was the first NBA playoff game to be held within Washington, D.C. city limits. In the Wizards' game five victory in Chicago, Arenas hit a buzzer-beater to win the game and the Wizards took their first lead in a playoff series since 1986. In game six, at the MCI Center, Jared Jeffries picked up a loose ball and went in for an uncontested tie-breaking dunk with 32 seconds left, giving the Wizards a 94–91 win and the team's first playoff series win in 23 years. They were only the 12th team in NBA history to win a playoff series after being down 0–2. This playoff series victory ended the second longest streak with no postseason series wins in NBA history.

In the conference semifinals, the Wizards were swept by the Miami Heat, the No. 1 seed in the Eastern Conference.

==== 2005–06 ====
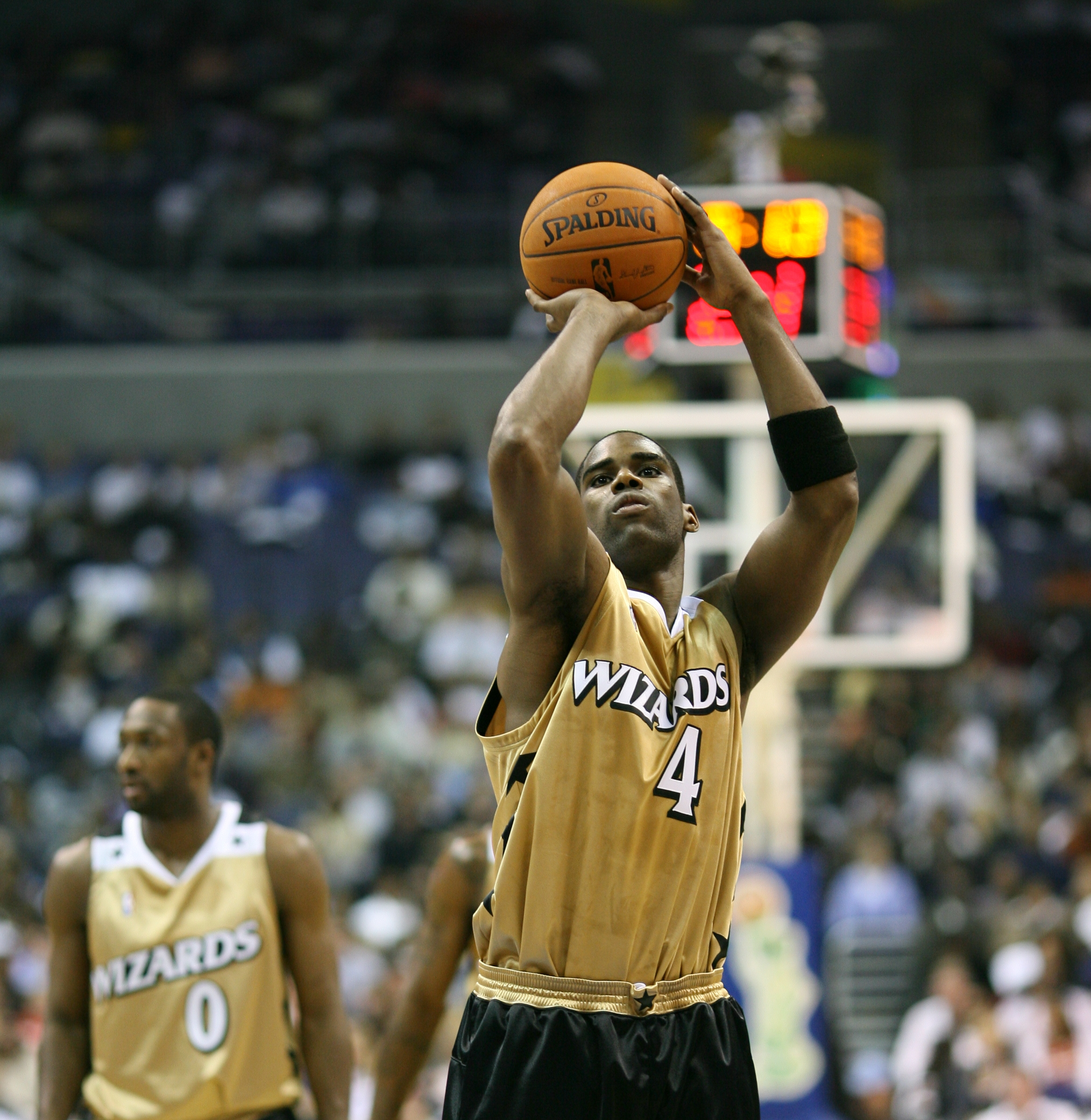
Antawn Jamison shooting a free throw in 2006 while wearing the team's gold alternate jersey.

The 2005–06 season was filled with ups and downs. During the off-season, Washington acquired Caron Butler and Antonio Daniels. During the regular season, the Wizards again had the best scoring trio in the NBA, this time consisting of Arenas, Jamison and Butler as the "Big Three". The Wizards started the 2005–06 season at 5–1, but went on an 8–17 funk to go to 13–18 through 31 games. Then, they went 13–5 in the next eighteen games. On April 5, 2006, the team was 39–35 and looking to close in on the 45-win mark achieved the previous year, until Butler suffered a thumb sprain and the Wizards lost all five games without him. Butler returned and the team pulled out their final three games, against the Pistons, Cavaliers and Bucks, all playoff-bound teams, to finish the year at 42–40 and clinch the fifth seed in the Eastern Conference. They averaged 101.7 points a game, third in the NBA and best in the East and clinched a playoff berth for the second consecutive season for the first time since 1987.

Their first-round match-up with Cleveland was widely seen as the most evenly matched series in the 2006 NBA playoffs. The teams exchanged wins during the first two games in Cleveland, with game two highlighted by the Wizards holding LeBron James to 7–25 shooting from the floor while Brendan Haywood gave James a hard foul in the first quarter that many cited as the key to shaking up the rest of James's game. In game three at the Verizon Center, James hit a 4-footer on the way down with 5.7 seconds left to take the game and the series lead for the Cavs with a 97–96 win. Arenas missed a potential game-winning three-pointer on the other end to seal the win for the Cavs. Game 4 saw the Wizards heat up again, as Arenas scored 20 in the fourth quarter after claiming he changed his jersey, shorts, shoes and tights in the room and the Wizards won 106–96. Yet in games five and six, the Cavs took control of the series, both games decided by one point in overtime. In game five, despite the Wizards being down 107–100 with 1:18 to play, the team drove back and eventually tied the game on Butler's layup with 7.5 seconds remaining to send the game to overtime, where James scored with 0.9 seconds left to send the Cavs to a 121–120 win. The series returned to the Verizon Center for game six, where the game went back and forth all night. The Wizards blew a 14-point first-quarter lead, then for 24 minutes, from early in the second quarter to early in the fourth, neither team led by more than five points at any time. The Wizards blew a seven-point lead with just under five to play and needed Arenas to hit a 31-foot shot at the end of regulation to take the game to overtime. In overtime, Arenas missed two key free throws. Cleveland rebounded the ball, went downcourt and Damon Jones hit a 17-foot baseline jump shot with 4.8 seconds remaining to give the Cavs the lead for good. Butler missed a three-pointer on the other end to seal the game, and the series, for the Cavaliers.

==== 2006–07 ====
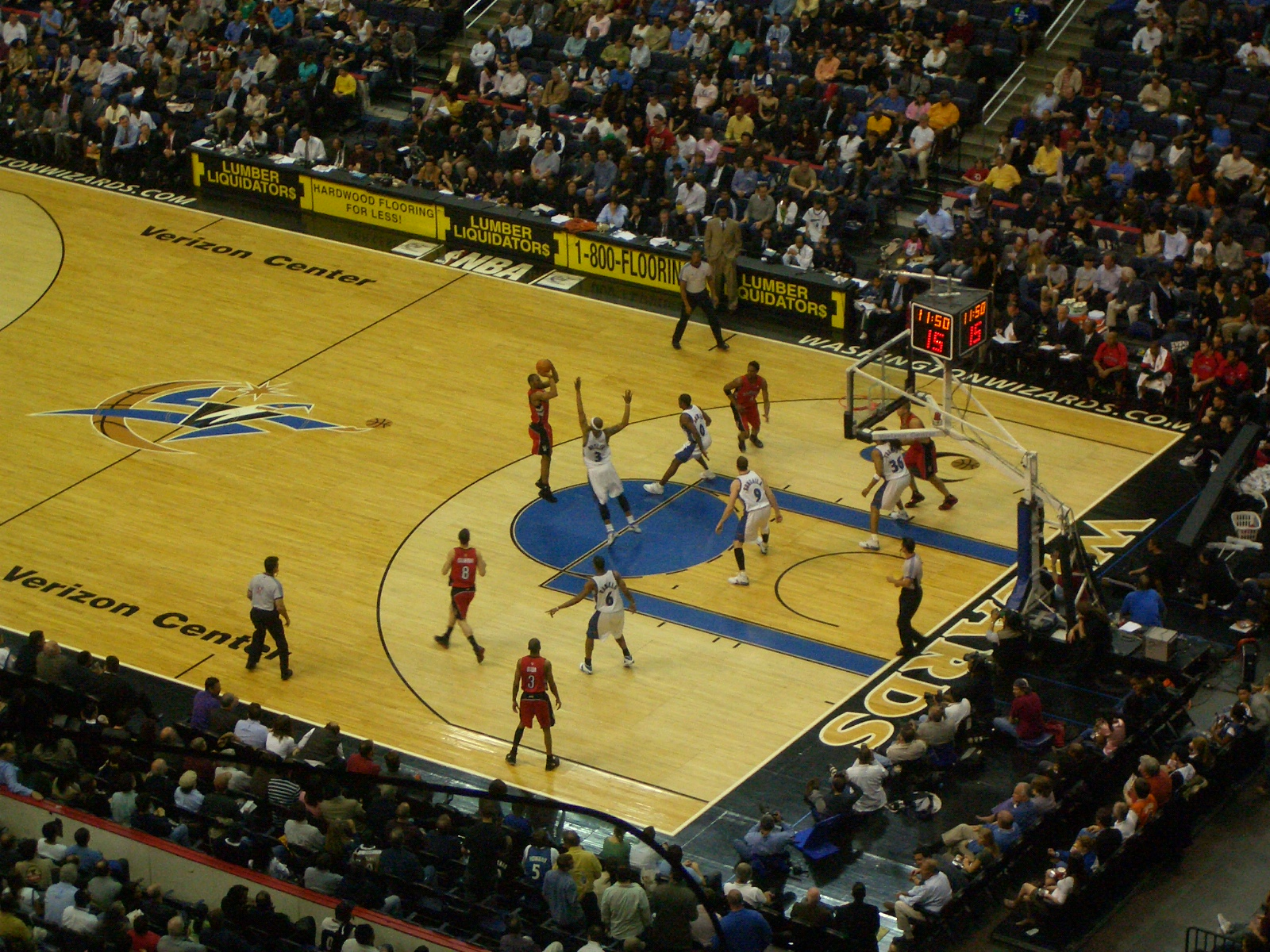
The Wizards in a home game against the Toronto Raptors, March 30, 2007.

The 2006–07 season started out very promisingly for the Wizards. In the off-season they signed free agents DeShawn Stevenson and Darius Songaila. Etan Thomas beat out Haywood for the starting center job. After starting the season 0–8 on the road, Washington rebounded to win 6 of 7 away from Verizon Center. After a November 4–9, Washington went 22–9 through December and January. Arenas scored a franchise-record 60 points against the Lakers on December 17. He and Eddie Jordan were named player of the month and coach of the month for December, respectively. On January 3 and again on January 15, Arenas hit buzzer-beating three-pointers to beat Milwaukee and Utah.

On January 30, Jamison went down with a sprained left knee in a win against Detroit. Washington went 4–8 in the 12 games without him. On February 3, Songaila made his Wizards debut against the Lakers. On February 18, Eddie Jordan became the first Wizards/Bullets coach to coach in the NBA All-Star Game since Dick Motta in 1978–1979. Arenas played in his third straight All-Star game and Butler made his All-Star Game debut.

On March 14, Butler went out with a knee injury that kept him out of the lineup for six games. He returned for only three games until he fractured his right hand on April 1 against Milwaukee. On April 4, Arenas suffered a season-ending knee injury, of the meniscus. An April 15 article in The Washington Post pointed out that with Arenas and Butler gone, the team had lost 42.3% of their offensive production, quite possibly "the most costly" loss for any team in the midst of a playoff hunt in NBA history.

Despite their late-season struggles without Arenas and Butler, the Wizards still managed to make the Eastern Conference playoffs, taking the 7th seed at 41–41. They were swept four games to none in a rematch of the previous year's first-round series against the Cleveland Cavaliers. Despite a depleted roster, the Wizards still managed to keep things close in every game in the series and only lost the final three games by a combined 20 points. The team enjoyed their best attendance figures in the post-Jordan era with a season attendance of 753,283 (18,372 per game).

==== 2007–08 ====
The Wizards retained a majority of their roster from the 2006–07 season, only losing Jarvis Hayes to Detroit, Calvin Booth to the Philadelphia 76ers, and Michael Ruffin to the Milwaukee Bucks as free agents. Washington signed Oleksiy Pecherov, the team's first-round pick in 2006, as well as 2007 picks Nick Young and Dominic McGuire. Etan Thomas missed the regular season after undergoing open-heart surgery.

The team began the season starting 0–5, but rebounded to win six straight. After eight games, Arenas underwent surgery to repair a torn medial meniscus in his left knee, as well as a microfracture surgery. This was the same knee he had injured the previous year. The injury forced Arenas out for a total of 68 games. Midway through the season, Butler was forced to the sidelines for a total of 20 games with what initially was a strained hip flexor, but turned out to be a labral tear. Despite all of the injuries, the Wizards managed to finish 43–39 on the regular season, good for 5th place in the Eastern Conference and a first-round playoff matchup with the Cleveland Cavaliers for the third straight season. However, the Wizards lost that series in six games.

==== 2008–09 ====
During the off-season, Arenas signed a six-year, $111 million contract, while Jamison signed a four-year, $50 million contract. The Wizards did not re-sign guard Roger Mason, who signed with the San Antonio Spurs. The Wizards added guards Dee Brown and Juan Dixon, and drafted JaVale McGee 18th overall in the 2008 NBA Draft.

In September, Arenas underwent a third operation on his surgically repaired left knee to clean out fluid and debris, and was expected to miss at least the first month of the season. The forecast came in longer than expected, as Arenas missed five months of action due to concerns about his knee, before returning on March 29, 2009. In the first game of the preseason, Jamison suffered a right knee contusion, and was expected to miss the rest of the preseason. Haywood announced that he would undergo surgery on his right wrist and was expected to miss four to six months. The preseason marked the return of Etan Thomas who had missed all of the 2007–2008 season while recovering from open-heart surgery. The Wizards added guard Fenny Falmagne from the Dakota Wizards on August 23, 2008, who was later waived by the team after a knee injury.

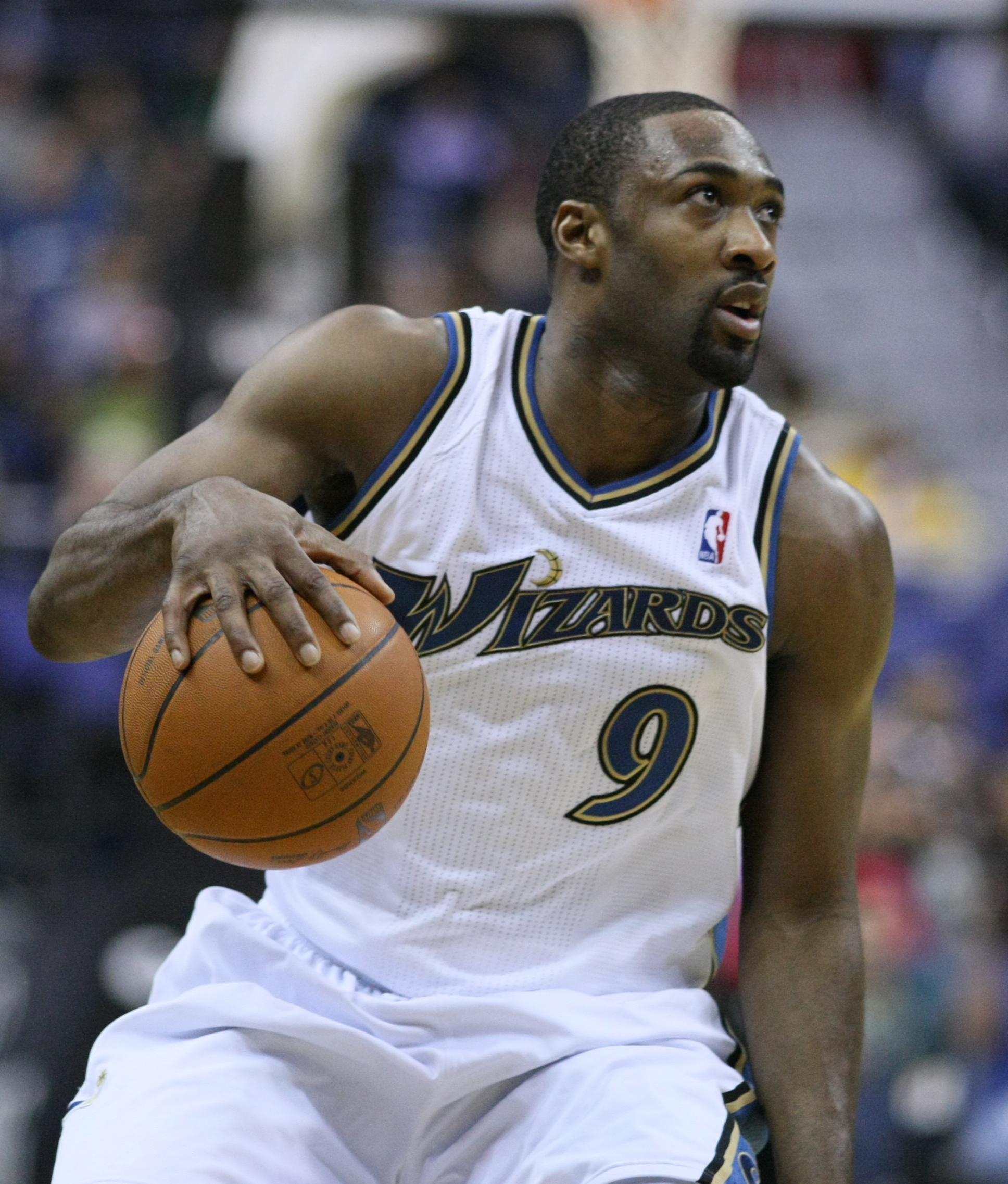
Gilbert Arenas in November 2010

The Wizards opened the season on October 29 with a loss against New Jersey, and dropped fifteen of their first nineteen games. Head coach Eddie Jordan was fired on November 24 after a 1–10 start, and was replaced by interim coach Ed Tapscott. On December 10, Washington acquired guards Javaris Crittenton and Mike James in a three-team deal that sent Antonio Daniels to New Orleans. The team waived guard Dee Brown. They won just 14 of their first 60 games and in the end tied a franchise-worst record of 19–63.

One of the few high points of the season came on February 27 when recently inaugurated President Barack Obama attended a Wizards game against the Chicago Bulls, sitting in a northeast court-side seat. The Wizards produced their second-biggest victory margin of the season with a 113–90 win; Jamison paced the side with 27 points.

On April 2, the Wizards shut down the Cleveland Cavaliers, who came in with a record of 61–13, and ended Cleveland's franchise-best winning streak at 13.

Flip Saunders reached an agreement to become the new coach of the team in mid-April 2009. Despite having the second-best chance at obtaining the number one overall pick in the 2009 draft, the Wizards were randomly chosen to pick fifth overall in the NBA Draft Lottery. This pick was later traded to the Minnesota Timberwolves, along with Songaila, Thomas, and Oleksiy Pecherov, in exchange for Randy Foye and Mike Miller. On May 21, 2009, Wizards president Ernie Grunfeld announced that the team had named Randy Wittman and Sam Cassell as assistant coaches. Then on August 11, 2009, the Wizards signed Fabricio Oberto, many weeks after he committed to signing with the team.

==== 2009–10 ====
In November, majority owner Abe Pollin died at the age of 85. At the time of his death, he was the longest-tenured owner in NBA history. Control of the franchise passed to his widow Irene, though minority owner Ted Leonsis was known to be preparing a takeover bid.

On December 24, 2009, it was revealed that Arenas had admitted to storing unloaded firearms in his locker at Verizon Center and had surrendered them to team security. In doing so, Arenas violated both NBA rules against bringing firearms into an arena and D.C. ordinances. On January 1, 2010, it was reported that Arenas and teammate Javaris Crittenton brought unloaded guns to the Wizards' locker room during a Christmas Eve argument regarding gambling debts; this led to Arenas's suspension. Despite Stern's longstanding practice of not disciplining players until the legal process played out, he felt compelled to act when Arenas' teammates surrounded him during pregame introductions with the Philadelphia 76ers and he pantomimed shooting them. The Wizards issued a statement condemning the players' actions as "unacceptable".

On February 13, 2010, after a 17–33 record at the season's midway point, The Wizards traded Butler, Haywood, and Stevenson to the Mavericks in exchange for Josh Howard, Drew Gooden, Quinton Ross and James Singleton. Three days later, the Wizards traded Antawn Jamison to the Cavaliers in exchange for Zydrunas Ilgauskas and obtained Al Thornton from the Los Angeles Clippers in a three-team deal. Ilgauskas reported long enough to take a physical (to make the trade official). His contract was immediately bought out, making him a free agent. On February 26, 2010, the Wizards signed Shaun Livingston to a 10-day contract. With Gilbert Arenas suspended and Caron Butler and Antawn Jamison being traded, the Wizards finished the season at 26–56, posting an abysmal 9–23 record to finish the season. They were the only Southeast Division team not to make the postseason.

=== 2010–2019: The John Wall era ===
==== 2010–11: The arrival of John Wall ====
Leonsis completed his takeover of the Wizards and Verizon Center in June through his newly-formed holding company, Monumental Sports & Entertainment. He had previously purchased the Washington Capitals and Mystics from the Pollin family. Leonsis took a fan-centric approach to running the franchise, by listening and responding to the concerns of Wizards supporters through his email and personal website. He wrote a manifesto of 101 changes he hoped to implement during his ownership, including changing the team's colors back to the red, white and blue of the Bullets era, and possibly changing the team nickname back to "Bullets" as well. Team president Ernie Grunfeld later confirmed that the franchise's colors would revert to red, white and blue from the 2011–12 season onwards. The team also adopted new uniforms that were very similar to the ones they wore from 1974 to 1987. Although the Wizards did not change their name to the Bullets again, they adopted a variation of the 1969–1987 Bullets logo with "wizards" spelled in all lowercase letters like the "bullets" logo was printed.

Despite having only the fifth-best odds of obtaining the No. 1 pick (10.3%), the Wizards won the 2010 NBA draft lottery and selected All-American Kentucky point guard John Wall with the first overall pick. Later in the off-season, the team acquired the Chicago Bulls' all-time leader in three-point field goals, Kirk Hinrich and the draft rights to forward Kevin Seraphin in exchange for the draft rights to Vladimir Veremeenko.

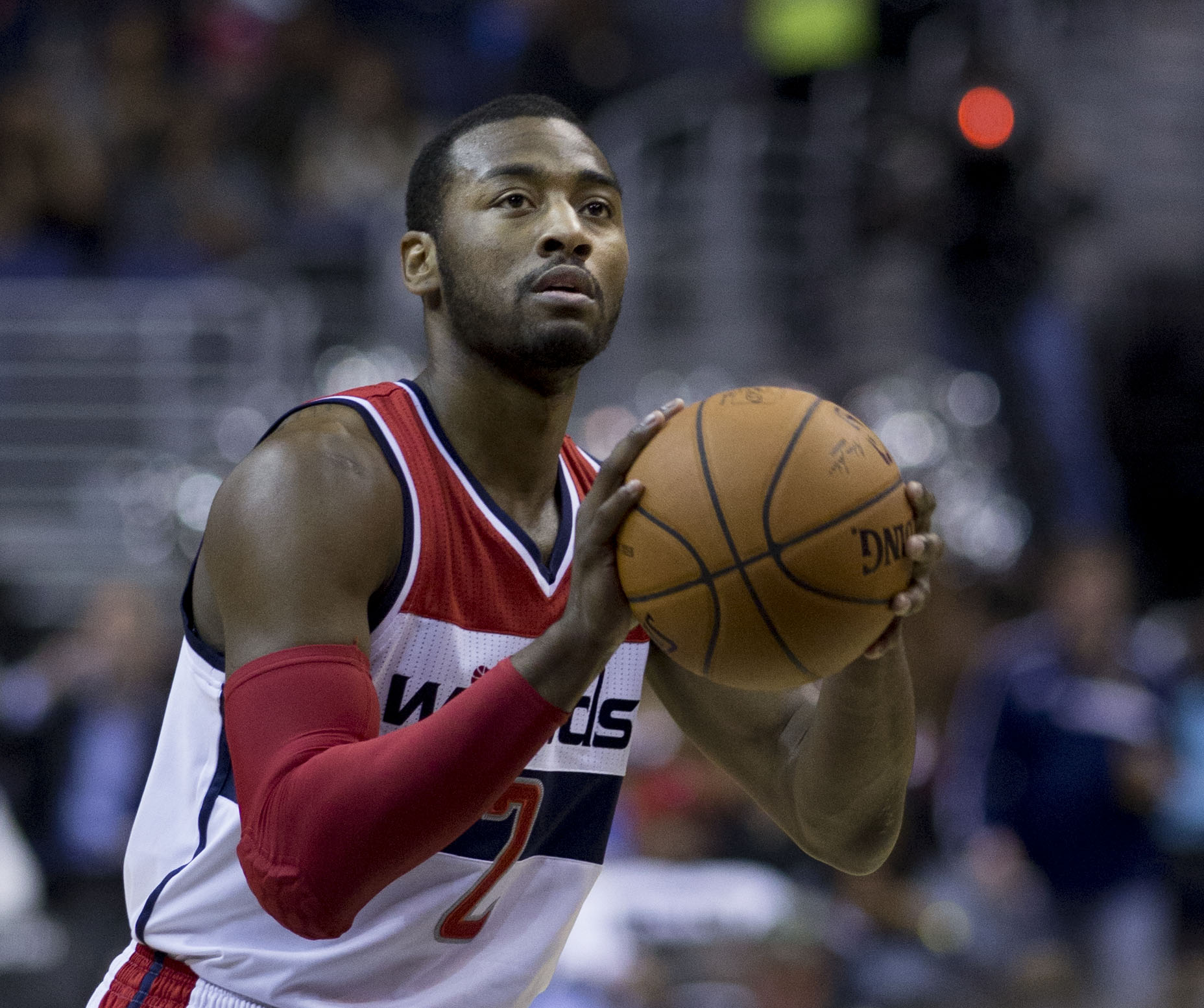
Hyper-athletic point guard John Wall led the Wizards to 4 playoff appearances during the 2010s

In a blockbuster trade, the Wizards sent Gilbert Arenas to the Orlando Magic in return for Rashard Lewis on December 18. Kirk Hinrich and Hilton Armstrong were traded to the Atlanta Hawks for Jordan Crawford, Maurice Evans, Mike Bibby, and a 2011 first-round pick that became Chris Singleton, although Mike Bibby bought out his contract after playing two games and eventually signed with the Miami Heat. The Wizards finished with a 30–52 record, once again occupying the bottom of the Southeast Division.

==== 2011–12 ====
After a poor start to the 2011–12 season, head coach Flip Saunders was fired and replaced by assistant Randy Wittman. On March 15, the Wizards were involved in a three-way trade that sent JaVale McGee and Ronny Turiaf to the Nuggets and Nick Young to the Clippers in exchange for Nenê and Brian Cook. After ending the season on a six-game win streak, the Wizards finished with a record of 20–46 (season was shortened due to the 2011 NBA Lockout) and the second-worst record in the NBA, comfortably ahead of the 7–59 Charlotte Bobcats who set an NBA record for the lowest win percentage in a season with .106. On June 20, the Wizards sent Lewis and a pick to the Hornets for Emeka Okafor and Trevor Ariza.

==== 2012–13: The arrival of Bradley Beal ====
In the 2012 NBA Draft, the Wizards selected Bradley Beal and Tomáš Satoranský. On July 17, 2012, the Wizards exercised the amnesty provision from the 2011 CBA to release Andray Blatche. They also signed A. J. Price. Then, on August 29, 2012, Martell Webster was signed to the Wizards for one year on a $1.6 million contract. He played well for what he was signed for and had a .422 average for three-point shots and a .442 field goal percentage. On April 30, 2013, Jason Collins, who joined the team in February, announced his homosexuality as a member of the Wizards. His announcement made him the first openly gay member of a North American team sport. The Wizards ended the season with a 33–49 record, finishing 12th in the Eastern Conference and fourth in the Southeast Division, 10 games ahead of the Orlando Magic.

On May 21, 2013, the Wizards went up five spots in the NBA draft lottery to make the number three overall selection for the second year in a row. They used that pick to draft Consensus All-American Otto Porter of Georgetown University. On October 25, 2013, Wizards' center Emeka Okafor and a top-12 protected 2014 first-round pick were traded to the Phoenix Suns for the center Marcin Gortat, Shannon Brown, Malcolm Lee and Kendall Marshall.

==== 2013–14: Return to playoffs ====
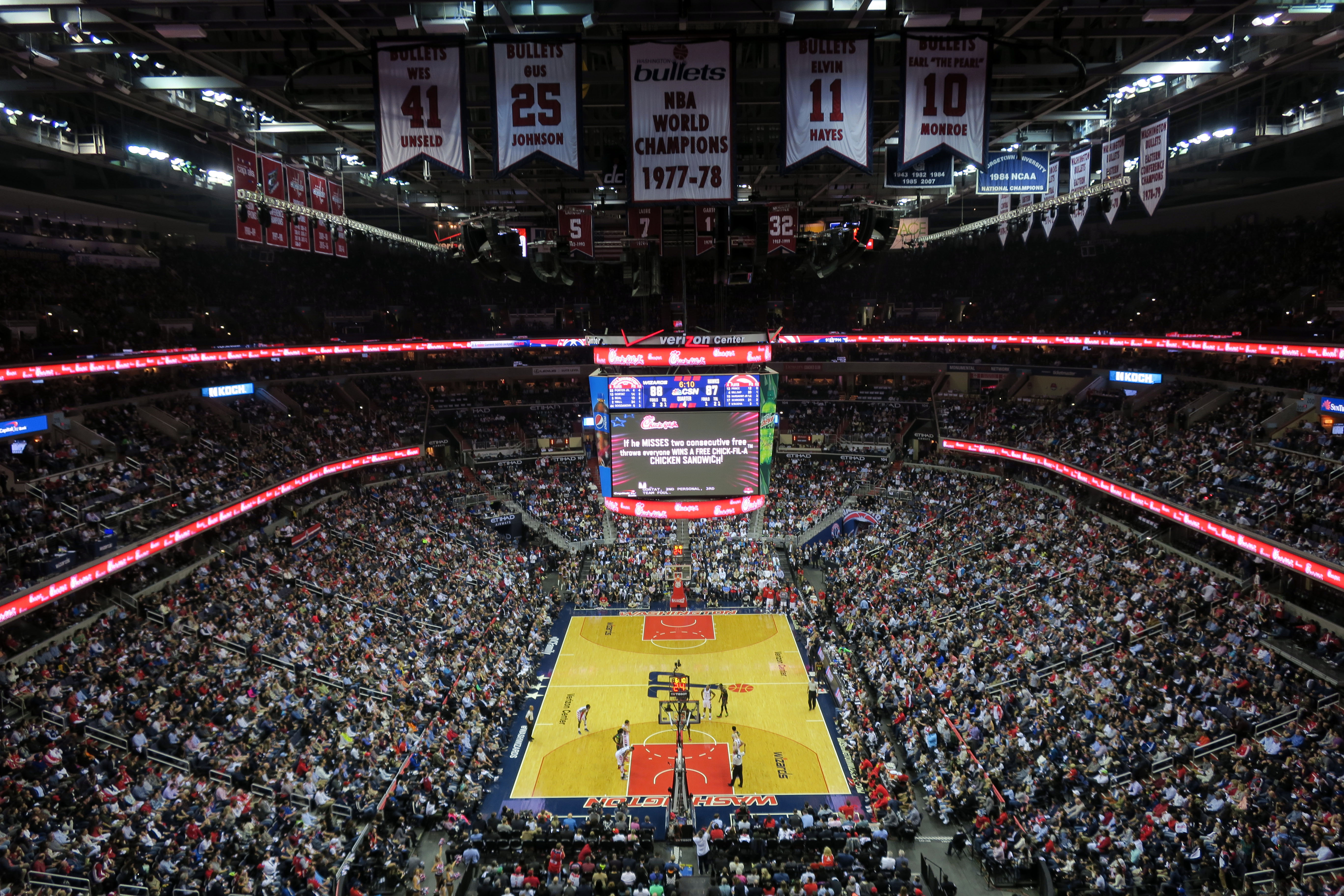
The Wizards returned to the playoffs in the 2014 season.

On February 3, 2014, the Wizards defeated the Portland Trail Blazers to improve to a 24–23 record. The win marked the first time the team had held a winning record since 2009.

On April 2, 2014, the Wizards defeated the Boston Celtics by a score of 118–92 to clinch the team's first playoff berth since the 2007–08 season. They would finish the season with a 44–38 record as the fifth seed, and led by first time All-Star John Wall, the Wizards defeated the Chicago Bulls 4–1 in the first round. This was the Wizards first series victory since the 2005 NBA playoffs when they defeated the same team in six games. The Wizards advanced to the Eastern Conference semifinals against the top-seeded Indiana Pacers. After a strong performance to steal Game 1, the Wizards would drop the next three games to fall behind 3–1 in the series, eventually falling in 6 games. Trevor Ariza would leave in the off-season.

==== 2014–15 ====
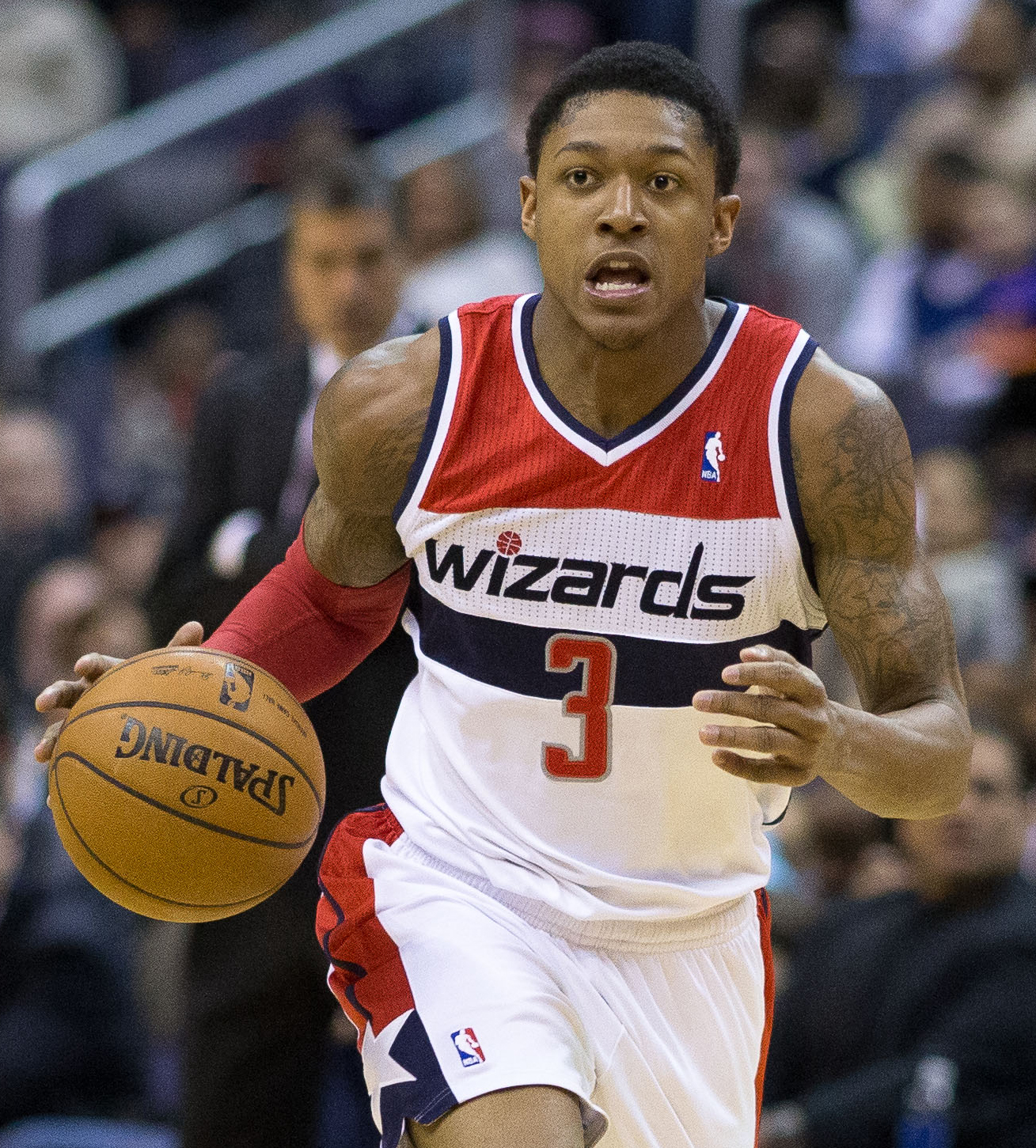
Bradley Beal in 2013

After the departure of Trevor Ariza, the Wizards signed veteran small forward Paul Pierce to a two-year contract. Pierce's veteran leadership proved to be a major factor on and off the court in the team's improvement. On November 12, 2014, the Wizards defeated the Detroit Pistons 107–103, extending their record to 6–2 for the first time since the 1975–76 season. Three days later, the Wizards defeated the Orlando Magic 98–93 as they won their third straight game and moved to 7–2, their best start since opening 7–1 during the 1974–75 season. With a 104–96 win over the Los Angeles Clippers on December 12, the Wizards moved to an 11–2 record at home to start the season for the first time in franchise history. They would struggle throughout the later months of the season but the Washington Wizards would finish the season with a 46–36 record, their best record since the 1978–1979 season. They played the Toronto Raptors in the first round of the NBA playoffs and won in four games, marking their first sweep in franchise history. After the victory over Toronto, the Wizards played the top-seeded Atlanta Hawks. The Wizards took the first game in the series, but suffered the loss of Wall due to a fractured wrist. Although small forward Paul Pierce made several big shots, the loss of Wall proved too much, and Atlanta took the series in six games.

==== 2015–16 ====
The 2015–16 season was much less successful. The Wizards finished 10th in the Eastern Conference with a 41–41 record, and missed the playoffs. On April 13, 2016, the Wizards fired head coach Randy Wittman.

On April 21, 2016, Scott Brooks, the former head coach of the Oklahoma City Thunder, agreed to a five-year, $35 million deal to be the head coach of the Wizards. On September 8, 2016, the team unveiled new alternative jerseys. From 2015 on, their logo was the "monument ball" with "Navy Blue, Red, Silver, White" colors. In October 2016, they were ranked 93rd of 122 worst franchises in major sports by Ultimate Standings.

==== 2016–17 ====
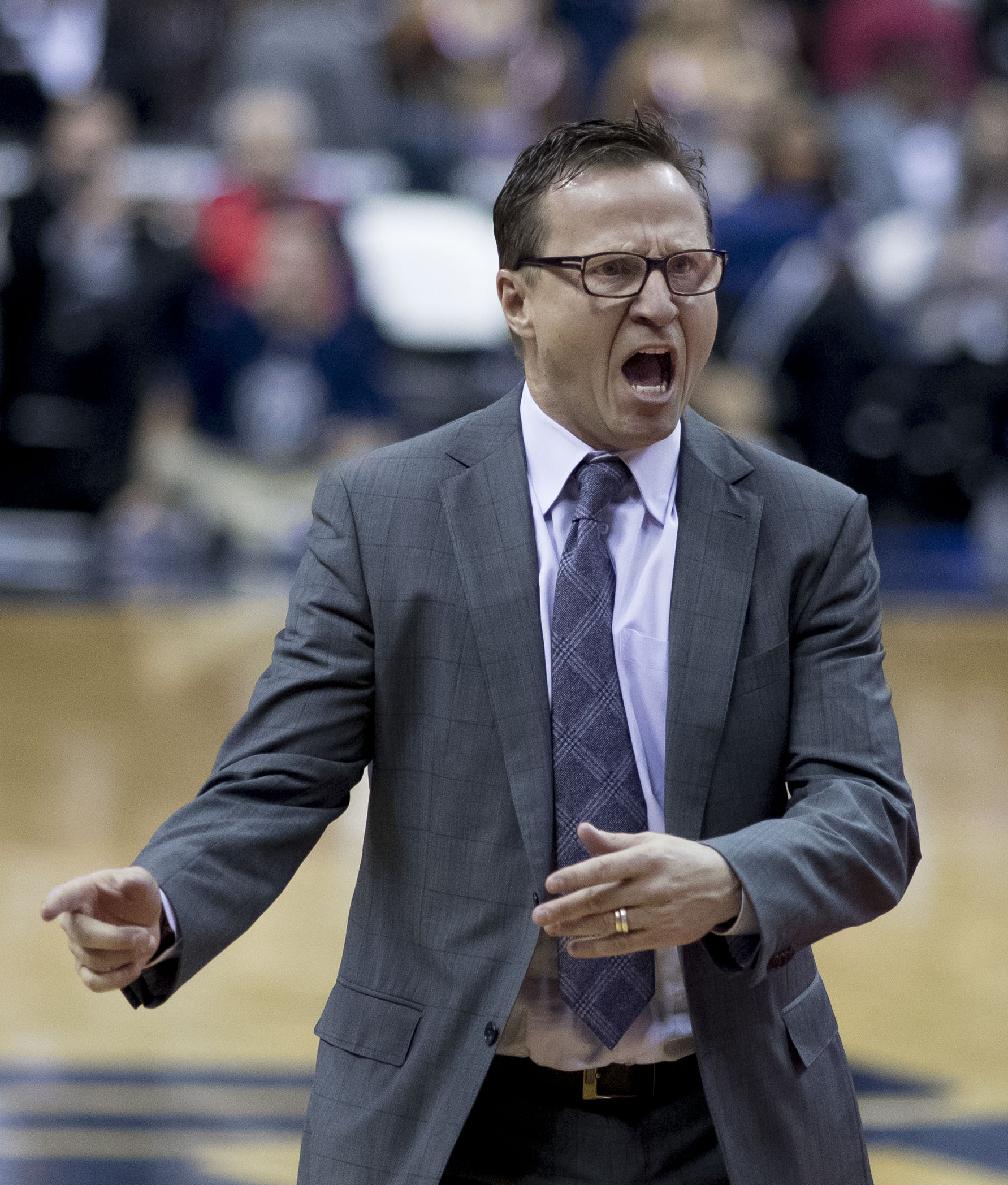
Scott Brooks served as head coach from 2016 to 2021.

The 2016–17 season would prove to be the most successful in recent Wizards history, after a 49–33 record and winning the Southeast Division for the first time since 1979. This came off the breakout of Bradley Beal who averaged a then career-high 23.1 points. Beal's rise matched the continued All-Star play of John Wall who averaged career highs in points and assists with 23.1 and 10.7, respectively, earning him an All-NBA team spot.

Despite starting the season 1–5, the Wizards would turn their season around, holding a record of 34–21 at the All-Star break. The Wizards finished the season 49–33, their highest win total since 1979.

In the first round of the playoffs the 4-seed Wizards were matched against the 5-seed Atlanta Hawks. After winning the first two games at home, the Wizards struggled on the road as the Hawks tied the series 2–2. The Wizards went on to win the next two games to close out the series at home behind stellar play from their backcourt of Wall and Beal who dropped a combined 73 points in the closeout Game 6 win.

In the second round, the Wizards faced the first-seeded Boston Celtics. They would go on to lose the series in 7 games.

==== 2017–18 ====
For the 2017–18 season, the Wizards would play their next season in the newly named Capital One Arena. The Wizards finished with a 43–39 record, which was good for the 8th seed, but lost the first round in six games to the top-seeded Toronto Raptors. Bradley Beal made his first All-Star team this season along with John Wall, who made his fifth in a row and last.

==== 2018–19 ====
In the off-season, the Wizards picked up Thomas Bryant off waivers and Troy Brown in the draft with the 15th pick in the 2018 NBA draft. Despite Bryant becoming a valuable asset and Bradley Beal having a career season, the season would end up being an underwhelming one full of turmoil and on-court troubles. The Wizards also went through injuries, including Dwight Howard playing 9 games before missing the rest of the season due to back problems and losing John Wall who underwent a season-ending surgery on his left Achilles which he injured while recovering from a previous injury, while trading Kelly Oubre Jr., Otto Porter Jr., and Markieff Morris at the same time. As a result, the Wizards would miss the playoffs for the first time since the 2015–16 season. Bradley Beal made his second All-Star Team.

==== 2019–20 ====
In April 2019, the Wizards fired general manager Ernie Grunfeld, who had been with the team since 2003, with Tommy Sheppard taking over as interim general manager until being officially hired fulltime in July 2019. Alongside other front office moves, the Wizards selected Japanese player Rui Hachimura with their 9th pick in the 2019 NBA draft, as well as acquiring the Philadelphia 76ers' draft rights to 42nd pick Admiral Schofield in a trade.

After the suspension of the 2019–20 NBA season, the Wizards were one of the 22 teams invited to the NBA Bubble to participate in the final eight games of the regular season, where the Wizards went 1–7 and missed the playoffs.

=== 2019–2023: The Bradley Beal era ===
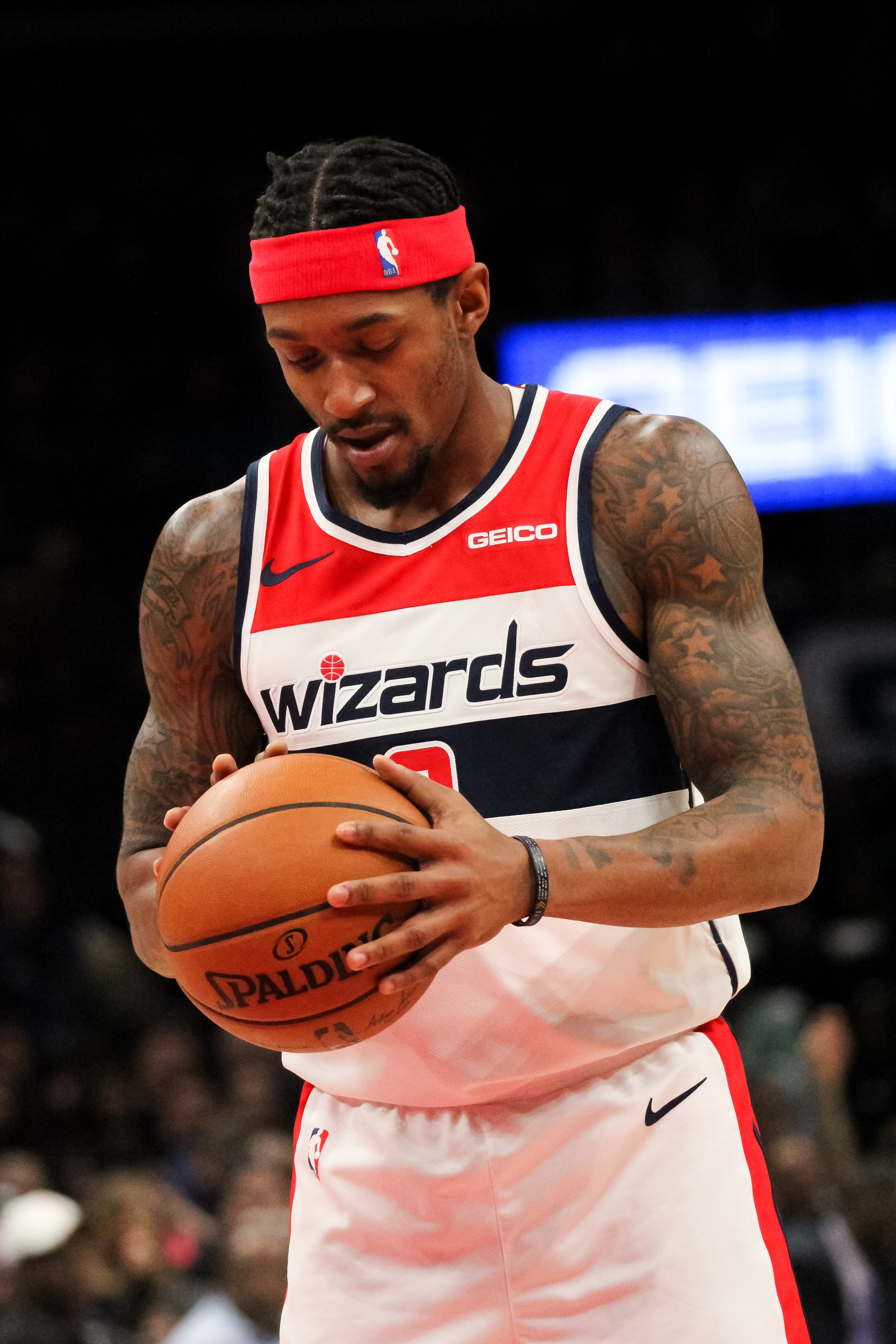
Bradley Beal in 2019

In December 2020, the Wizards traded John Wall and a first-round draft pick to the Houston Rockets for Russell Westbrook.

In the 2020 NBA draft, the Wizards drafted Deni Avdija and Vít Krejčí; Krejčí's draft rights were later traded to the Oklahoma City Thunder for the rights to Cassius Winston. Avdija fractured his ankle in April 2021, effectively ending his season. Bradley Beal had a career season, making All-NBA Third Team for the first time of his career. Russell Westbrook averaged a triple double for the fourth time in his career, despite not making the All-Star team.

The Wizards returned to the playoffs this season, but were defeated by the Philadelphia 76ers in five games.

On June 16, 2021, Brooks and the Wizards agreed to part ways after not being able to agree to a new contract.

On August 6, 2021, Washington Wizards traded Russell Westbrook, 2024 second-round pick and 2028 second-round pick to the Los Angeles Lakers for Kyle Kuzma, Kentavious Caldwell-Pope and Montrezl Harrell.

After a hot start to the season, the Wizards record slowly slipped. Notable losses include a 35-point lead blown to the Clippers and a loss to the 76ers which started a fight between Kentavious Caldwell-Pope and Montrezl Harrell. The Wizard's woes continued as a wrist injury that required surgery kept the team's scoring leader, Beal, out for the remainder of the season.

The trade deadline of the 2021–22 season saw a major roster change. The Wizards acquired All-Star Kristaps Porziņģis in a trade for Spencer Dinwiddie and Davis Bertans, a sharpshooter whose 5-year, $80 million contract yielded lackluster results during his time in Washington.

On April 19, 2023, after a consecutive season of 35-47 and missing the playoffs, the Wizards fired GM Tommy Sheppard.

=== 2023–present: Rebuild ===
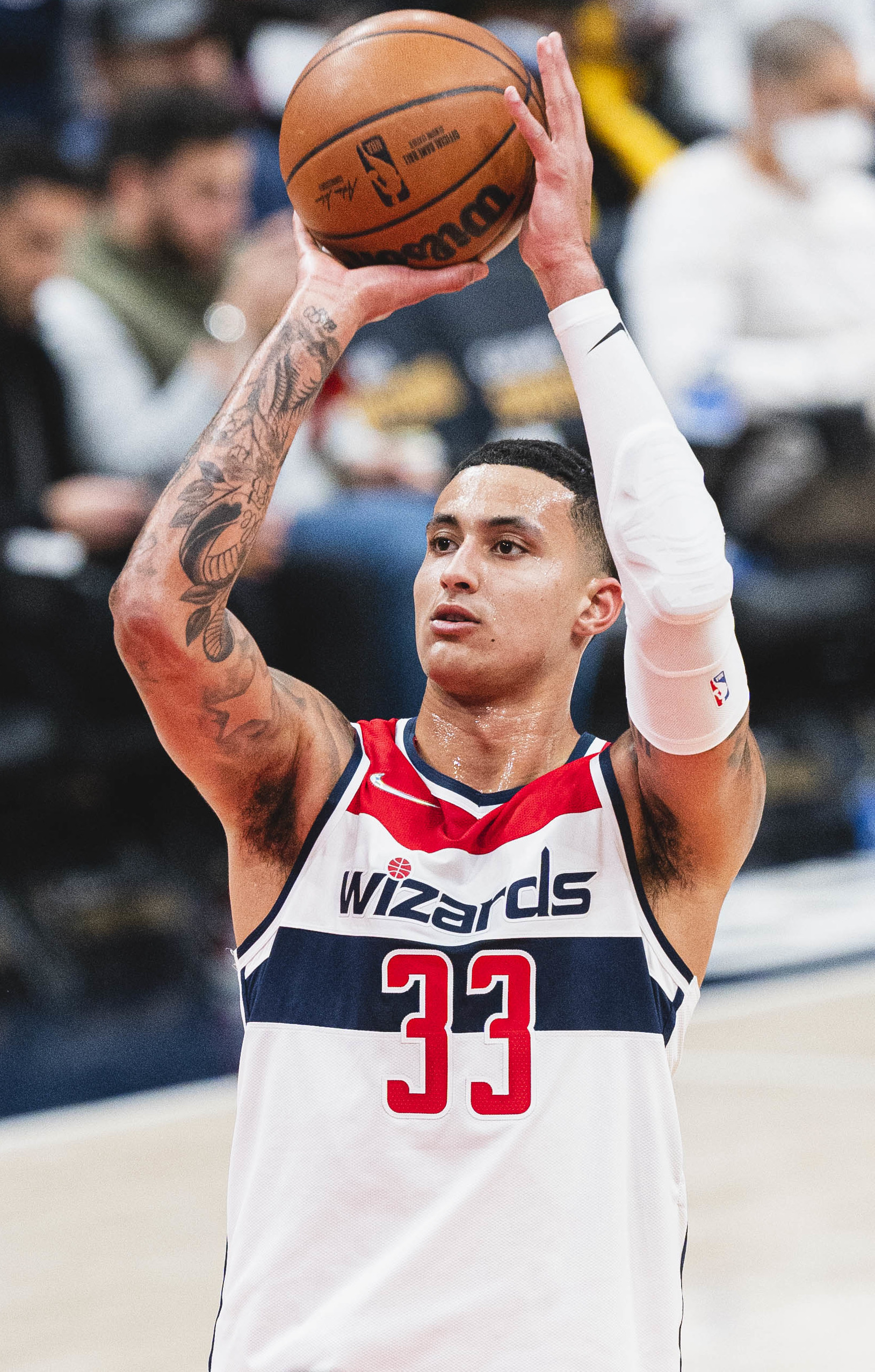
Kyle Kuzma joined the team in 2021

During the off-season of the 2023–24 season, the Wizards started a rebuild, trading their franchise player Bradley Beal to the Phoenix Suns for a 12-time All Star Chris Paul and traded Porziņģis to the Celtics in a three-team trade for Tyus Jones, Danilo Gallinari, Mike Muscala and draft picks. Chris Paul was then traded to the Warriors for Patrick Baldwin Jr., Jordan Poole, draft picks and cash considerations.

On January 26, 2024, head coach Wes Unseld Jr. was fired and replaced by assistant coach Brian Keefe for the rest of the season. During February, the Wizards became just the 15th team in NBA history to go winless for a month. The Wizards finished with a record of 15–67, led in scoring by Kyle Kuzma with 22.2 points per game, his career high, in 70 games.

==== 2024–25: The arrival of Alex Sarr ====
On June 26, 2024, the Wizards drafted Alex Sarr from France in the NBA draft with the second overall pick. They also acquired the fourteenth pick in the draft, Carlton Carrington as well as 2023 Sixth Man of The Year Malcolm Brogdon and future first-round picks for Deni Avdija. Brian Keefe was also promoted from interim coach to full-time head coach. The Wizards would lose 60 games for a second consecutive season, going 18–64, second worst in the league.

==== 2026–present: Acquiring Trae Young, Anthony Davis and AJ Dybansta ====
On January 7, 2026, the Wizards traded CJ McCollum and Corey Kispert for all-star guard Trae Young. Just one month later, on February 5, 2026, they acquired Anthony Davis from the Mavericks for Khris Middleton and two first-round picks. However, Young and Davis would not immediately suit up while recovering from injuries. The Wizards finished the season with a 17–65 record, the second worst in franchise history and the worst one throughout the entire season. After being awarded the 1st pick in the 2026 draft, the Wizards selected AJ Dybantsa.

== Season-by-season record ==
List of the last five seasons completed by the Wizards. For the full season-by-season history, see List of Washington Wizards seasons.

Note: GP = Games played, W = Wins, L = Losses, W–L% = Winning percentage

Season	GP	W	L	W–L%	Finish	Playoffs
2021–22	82	35	47	.427	4th, Southeast	Did not qualify
2022–23	82	35	47	.427	3rd, Southeast	Did not qualify
2023–24	82	15	67	.183	5th, Southeast	Did not qualify
2024–25	82	18	64	.220	5th, Southeast	Did not qualify
2025–26	82	17	65	.207	5th, Southeast	Did not qualify

== Team name, logos and uniforms ==
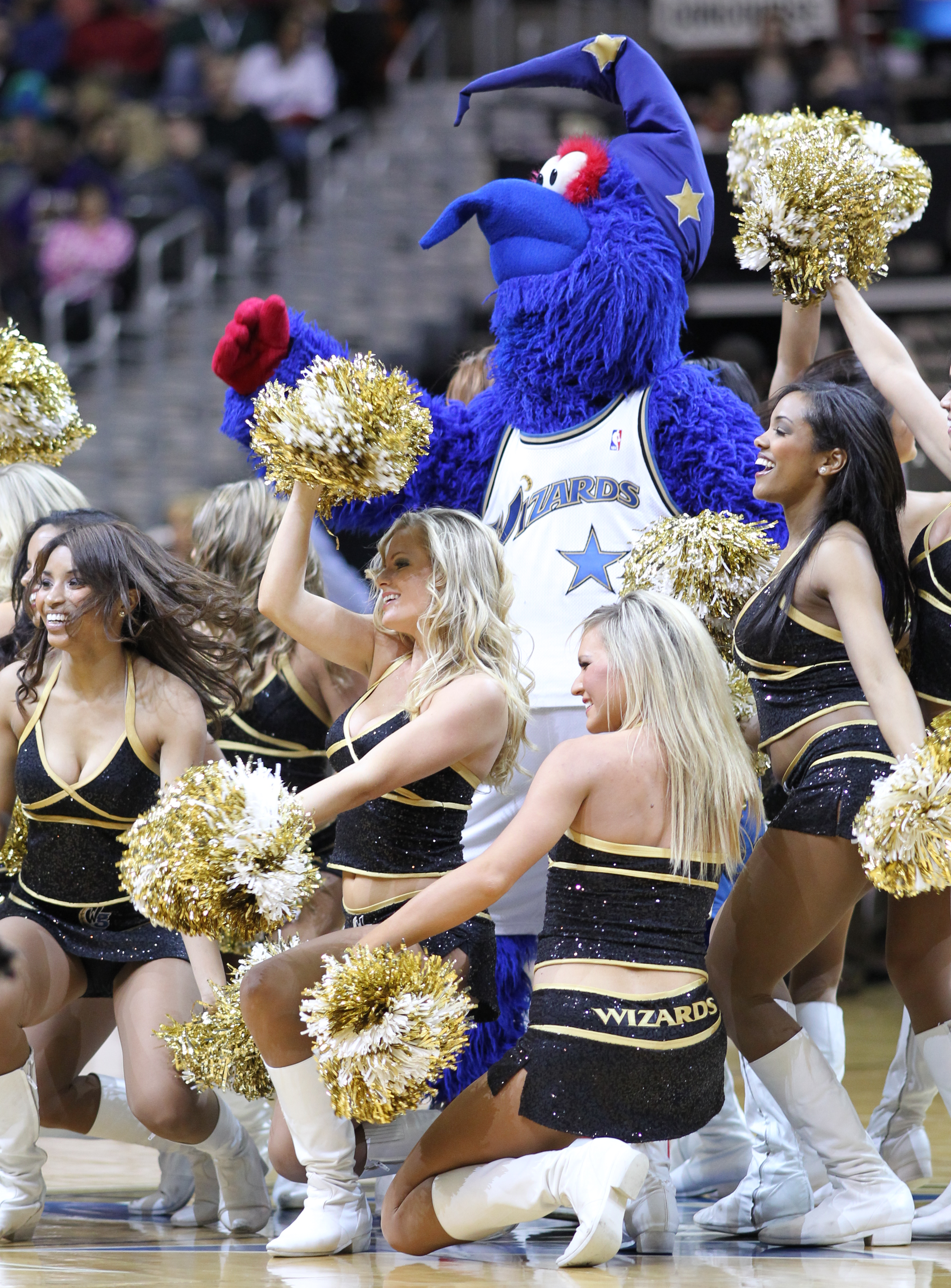
Washington Wizards G-Wiz, current team mascot

After moving from Chicago in 1963, the Baltimore Bullets originally went with a blue and orange scheme, which matched the city's Orioles baseball team (orange) and Colts football team (blue). The Bullets initially wore blue and white uniforms with orange trim, but in the early 1970s, orange supplanted blue as the primary color. During this era, the Bullets also wore unconventional uniforms, featuring three thick stripes which ran from the right leg up to the left side of the jersey. Beginning with the 1973–74 season, coinciding with the team's move to Landover, Maryland, to become the Capital Bullets, they changed their colors to red, white and blue to match the American flag. Those uniforms also featured large horizontal stripes on the chest of the jerseys, and three stars on the side panels of the shorts. The uniforms were kept when they changed their location identifier a year later to the Washington Bullets.

The Bullets kept the "Stars and Stripes" uniform until 1987, although they made a minor adjustment before the 1985–86 season with additional thin stripes, the "Bullets" logo on the right leg, and thin shorts stripes replacing the three stars. In 1987, the Bullets changed their logo and uniforms, going with red uniforms on the road and white uniforms at home. With the exception of a switch to block lettering and numbers before the 1990–91 season (switching over from the Serpentine font used for both elements, with the player name on back rendered in lower case as well), the Bullets kept these uniforms until 1997.

In 1997, the team owner, Abe Pollin, decided to change the club's nickname from "Bullets" to "Wizards". The reasoning behind the name change was because Pollin did not want the team's name to continue to be associated with any violent connotations. The name change also included new logos, colors and uniforms, coinciding with the team's move to the new MCI Center (now Capital One Arena); though they would not play in the new arena until December 2, during which they played their first few home dates at the USAir Arena. The new team's colors were blue, bronze and black, the same colors used by the Capitals which they first unveiled two years earlier. The primary logo depicted a wizard conjuring a basketball with a quarter moon. In 2007, the Wizards made minor modifications on their team jerseys and logos. To accommodate the gold–black alternate jerseys they introduced the previous season along with the design change on the Verizon Center floor, they changed their secondary team colors from bronze to metallic gold, and the player's name on the back of the jersey was changed from white and blue with bronze trim to gold (blue on home uniforms) with a change in lettering; the road uniform name lettering changed back to white with gold trim before the 2010–11 season.

The old Washington Wizards Logo from 2011 to 2015.

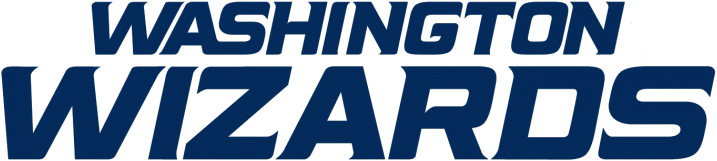
The current wordmark for the Wizards

On May 10, 2011, the Wizards unveiled a new color scheme, uniforms, and logo. David Safren, Pat Sullivan, and Michael Glazer were the product designers for the new jerseys which include the Washington Monument as an alternate logo. The team of product designers was led by Jessie Caples, who made most of the design decisions. James Pinder was also an essential part of the team, as he helped to engineer the jerseys to meet the players' standards. The team reverted to its traditional red, white and blue colors, which are the colors of the U.S. flag. The uniforms are based very closely on those worn from 1973 to 1987, during the team's glory years. Leonsis said the throwback to the old Bullets' uniforms was intentional; the only difference between those uniforms and the current ones is the team name on the jerseys. The colors were also used by Leonsis' other franchises, the Capitals and the Mystics, who adopted those colors in 2007 and 2011, respectively. Another Washington-based team, baseball's Washington Nationals, also use this scheme; the Washington Commanders (burgundy and gold) and D.C. United (red and black) are currently the city's only professional sports teams not to adopt the red, white and blue scheme.

On July 23, 2014, the Wizards unveiled a new alternate uniform. The uniform was similar to the club's road set, with the navy and red colors switched, so that navy was the predominant color instead of red.

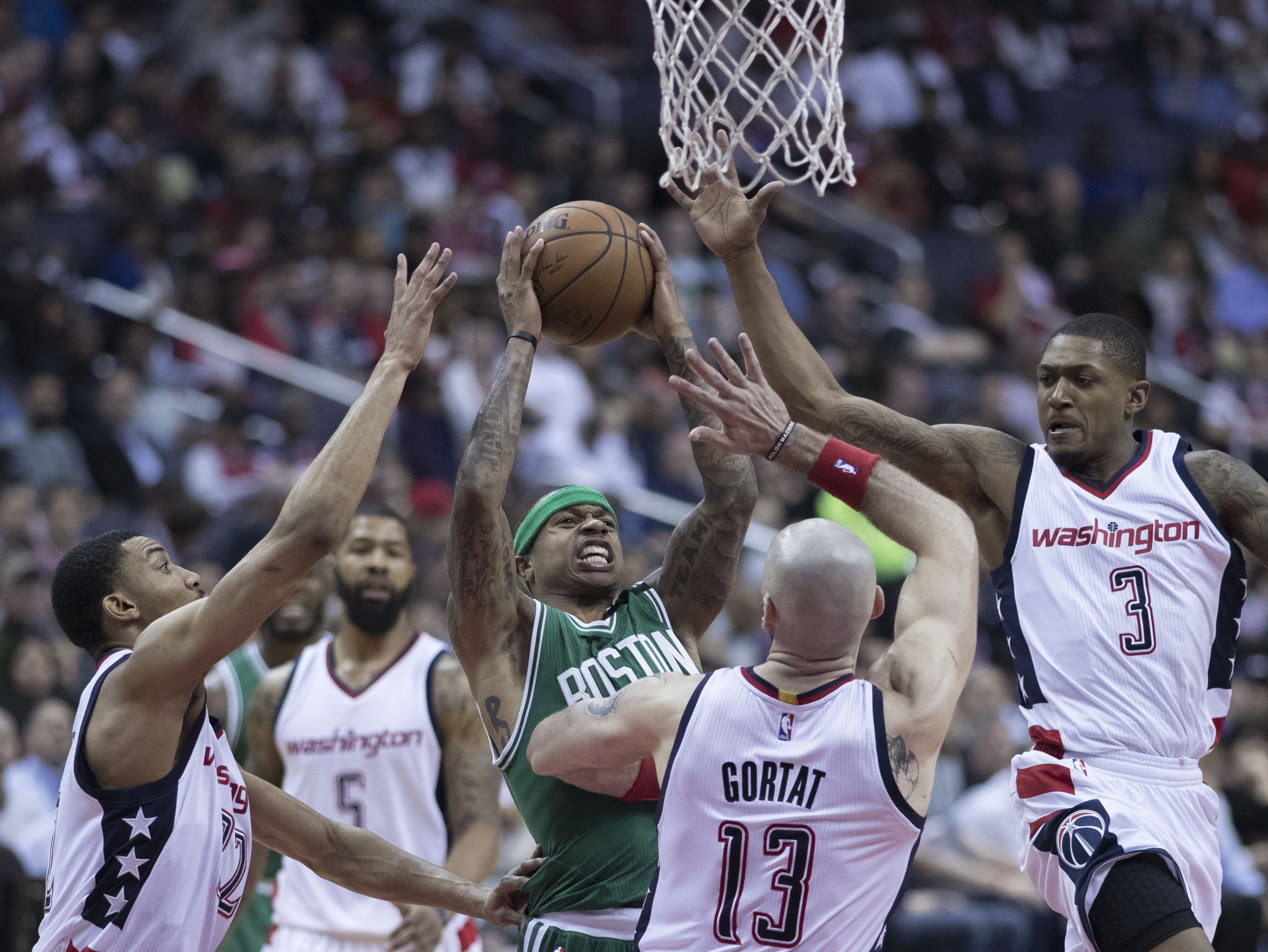
The Wizards in their alternate white uniforms in a 2017 playoff game against the Celtics

On April 15, 2015, the Wizards unveiled a new primary logo. The new logo features the Washington Monument ball logo set in a roundel, with the striping pattern from the team's uniforms, three stars (each representing Washington, D.C., Maryland, and Virginia, similar to that of the NHL's Capitals), and the team's wordmarks. The team also said it would immediately discontinue the use of the wizard-partial moon logo, which had been used since 1997.

On September 30, 2015, the Wizards unveiled a new alternate uniform. Called the "Baltimore Pride" uniform, the uniform was intended to be worn for six select games during the Wizards' 2015–16 season.

On September 8, 2016, the Wizards released a second white uniform to honor the United States Armed Forces. The side stripes pay homage to the American flag.

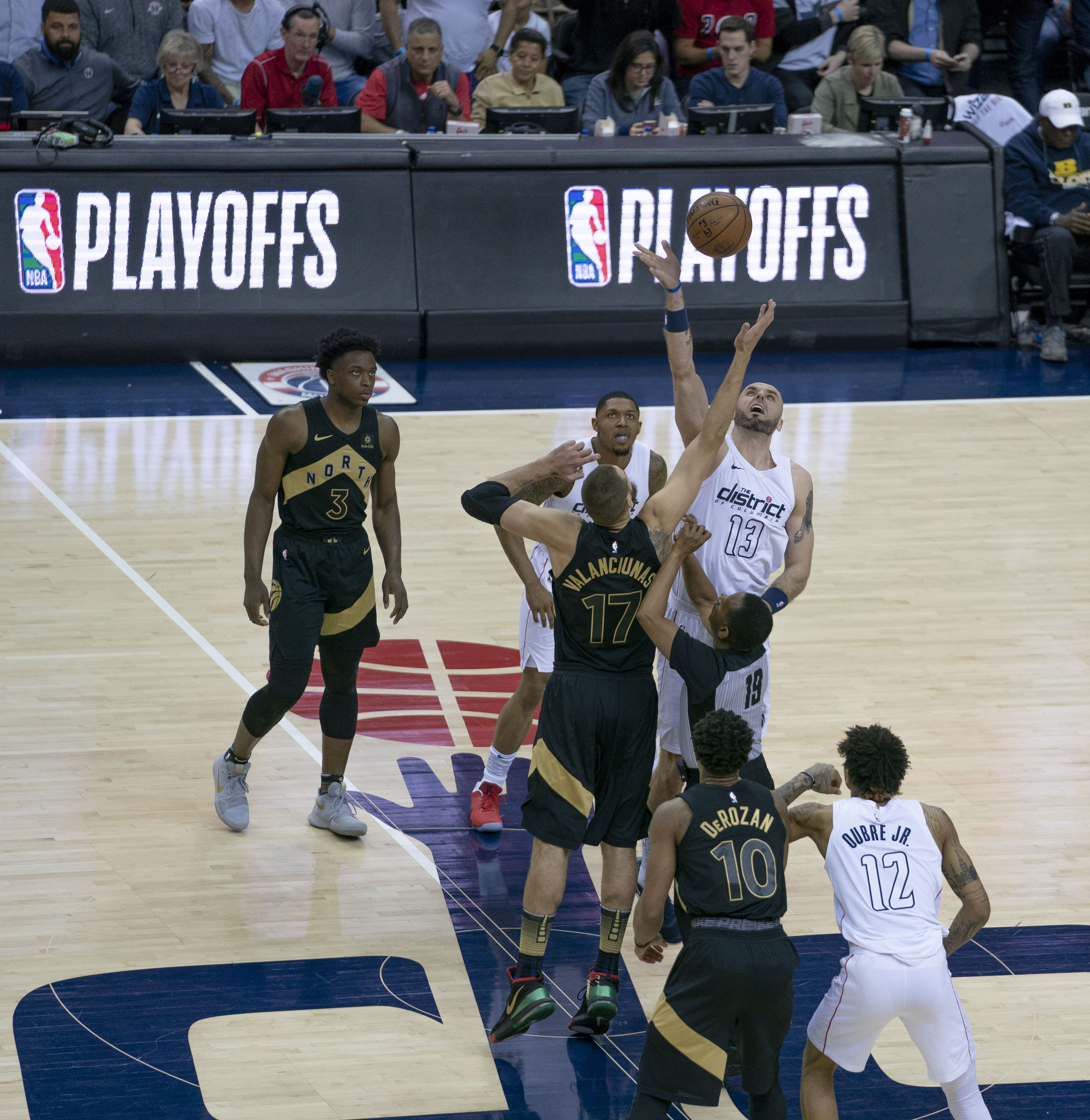
The Wizards in their white "City" uniforms during a 2018 playoff game against Toronto.

The Wizards kept their existing uniforms (minus the two alternate uniforms) when Nike took over as uniform supplier in 2017. Along with the white "Association", red "Icon" and navy "Statement" uniforms, a "City" uniform was also released as part of the collection. The 2017–18 "City" uniform featured a white base, "The District of Columbia" wordmark in navy and numbers in white. The uniform paid tribute to the Washington Monument. The "City" uniform for 2018–19 was similar to the previous set, but with a black base, white letters and orange trim. The uniform paid homage to the National Mall at night. A red version of the 2017–18 "City" uniform served as the team's "Earned" uniform, which was a reward for making the 2018 playoffs.

Before the 2019–20 season, the navy "Statement" uniform received a minor adjustment as the city name was replaced with "The District of Columbia" wordmark previously used on the team's "City" uniforms.

For the Wizards' 2019–20 "City" uniform, they brought back the white alternate uniform design worn in the 2016–17 season, but with the "dc" alternate logo in front and red numbers. The same design was carried over to the 2020–21 "City" uniform, but with a grey base.

In the 2021–22 season, the Wizards were one of 27 teams to wear mashup "City" uniforms in commemoration of the NBA's 75th anniversary. This uniform featured a lighter blue base and red stripes (a nod to the 1973–1985 Bullets uniforms), gold trim and stylized uniform numbers (acknowledging the 1997–2011 Wizards uniforms), the stylized "Washington" typeface (like the present-day uniforms), and a tribute to the recently deceased Wes Unseld along the jock tag. Three mashup logos were also added. The alternate, "Monument", logo on the waist was altered to feature the throwback ball from the 1973–1987 Bullets logo, while the logos on the shorts feature the alternate "dc" logo in the shape of the Bullets logo, and the "DMV" logo modeled after the alternate 1997–2011 Wizards' "dc" logo.

The 2022–23 "City" uniform was unveiled alongside the Washington Nationals' "City Connect" uniform; both the NBA and Major League Baseball currently have uniform deals with Nike. This uniform, which is predominantly pink with blue accents, pays homage to the cherry blossoms which permeate Washington, D.C. in the spring.

The "City" uniform used for the 2023–24 season featured a black and anthracite base with red, bronze and patina accents. The uniform was a nod to the history of Washington, D.C. with blackletter lettering based on the original prints used in the 1700s, three red stars representing the capital flag, red diagonal stripes representing the original map of the district, and boundary stones represented by the bronze and patina gradients.

Ahead of the 2024–25 season, the Wizards changed their "Statement" uniform, taking cues from the Washington, D.C. flag with three red stars and two thick red stripes. "The District of Columbia" wordmark remained on the uniforms, with the only white elements being on the numbers and letters. Their "City" uniform for the season kept last year's blackletter lettering but with a hydrogen blue base, red letters and blue trim. The uniform was nicknamed the "Beyond Boundaries" uniform.

The 2025–26 "City" uniform brought back the template of the 2021–22 "City" uniform, but with gold and black elements inspired by the team's 2006–2009 alternate uniform.

== Home arenas ==
- International Amphitheatre (1961–1962)
- Chicago Coliseum (1962–1963)
- Baltimore Civic Center (now CFG Bank Arena) (1963–1973, 35 games from 1989 to 1997)
- Cole Field House (1973)
- US Airways Arena (originally Capital Centre) (December 1973 – November 1997)
- Capital One Arena (formerly MCI Center and Verizon Center) (December 1997–present)

In December 2023, Monumental Sports & Entertainment founder and team owner Ted Leonsis engaged in a non-binding partnership with Virginia governor Glenn Youngkin to move the Wizards and Washington Capitals to a planned arena in Potomac Yard in Alexandria, Virginia, by 2028. The structure would be part of an arts and entertainment district at the site, which would include a practice facility, restaurants, an esports venue, concert hall, and a new headquarters for Monumental. In March 2024, after officials in Alexandria announced that the $2 billion entertainment and sports complex plans were scrapped, Washington, D.C. mayor Muriel Bowser announced she has signed a deal with both teams' majority owner, Ted Leonsis, to keep the Wizards and Capitals in the District "at least until 2050."

== Personnel ==
=== Current roster ===
Washington Wizards roster
Players

Pos.	No.	Player	Height	Weight	DOB	From
C	8	Deandre Ayton	7 ft 0 in (2.13 m)	252 lb (114 kg)	1998-07-23	Arizona
G	26	Reece Beekman (injured) (TW)	6 ft 1 in (1.85 m)	190 lb (86 kg)	2001-10-08	Virginia
G	7	Bub Carrington	6 ft 4 in (1.93 m)	190 lb (86 kg)	2005-07-21	Pittsburgh
G/F	9	Justin Champagnie (injured)	6 ft 6 in (1.98 m)	206 lb (93 kg)	2001-06-29	Pittsburgh
G	0	Bilal Coulibaly	6 ft 7 in (2.01 m)	195 lb (88 kg)	2004-07-26	France
F/C	23	Anthony Davis	6 ft 10 in (2.08 m)	253 lb (115 kg)	1993-03-11	Kentucky
F	4	AJ Dybantsa	6 ft 9 in (2.06 m)	210 lb (95 kg)	2007-01-29	BYU
F	18	Kyshawn George	6 ft 8 in (2.03 m)	200 lb (91 kg)	2003-12-12	Miami (FL)
F	16	Anthony Gill	6 ft 7 in (2.01 m)	230 lb (104 kg)	1992-10-17	Virginia
G	12	Tre Johnson (injured)	6 ft 5 in (1.96 m)	190 lb (86 kg)	2006-03-07	Texas
G	1	Tre Mann	6 ft 4 in (1.93 m)	178 lb (81 kg)	2001-02-03	Florida
F	22	Khris Middleton	6 ft 7 in (2.01 m)	222 lb (101 kg)	1991-08-12	Texas A&M
C	34	Felix Okpara (TW)	6 ft 11 in (2.11 m)	235 lb (107 kg)	2004-04-20	Tennessee
F	27	Will Riley	6 ft 9 in (2.06 m)	180 lb (82 kg)	2006-02-10	Illinois
C	20	Alex Sarr	7 ft 0 in (2.13 m)	205 lb (93 kg)	2005-04-26	France
F	00	Tristan Vukčević (injured)	7 ft 0 in (2.13 m)	220 lb (100 kg)	2003-03-11	Serbia
F	5	Jamir Watkins (injured) (TW)	6 ft 5 in (1.96 m)	210 lb (95 kg)	2001-07-06	Florida State
G	3	Trae Young	6 ft 1 in (1.85 m)	164 lb (74 kg)	1998-09-19	Oklahoma

Coaches
Head coach
- Brian Keefe
Assistant(s)
- Alexis Ajinça
- Adam Caporn
- Patrick Ewing
- James Fraschilla
- J. J. Outlaw
- T. J. Sorrentine
- Cody Toppert
- David Vanterpool

Legend
- (DP) Unsigned draft pick
- (FA) Free agent
- (S) Suspended
- (GL) G League assignment
- (TW) Two-way affiliate player
- Injured

Roster
Updated: October 17, 2026

=== Retained draft rights ===
The Wizards hold the draft rights to unsigned draft picks who have been playing outside the NBA. A drafted player, either an international draftee or a college draftee who is not signed by the team that drafted him, is allowed to sign with any non-NBA teams. In this case, the team retains the player's draft rights in the NBA until one year after the player's contract with the non-NBA team ends. This list includes draft rights that were acquired from trades with other teams.

Draft	Round	Pick	Player	Pos.	Nationality	Current team	Note(s)	Ref
2022	2	54	Yannick Nzosa	C	DR Congo	San Pablo Burgos (Spain)		
2017	2	50	Mathias Lessort	C	France	Panathinaikos (Greece)	Acquired as part of a multi-team trade on February 6, 2025	

=== Retired numbers ===
Washington Wizards retired numbers
No.	Player	Position	Tenure	Retired
10	Earl Monroe	G	1967–1971^{1}	December 1, 2007
11	Elvin Hayes	F	1972–1981^{2}	November 20, 1981
25	Gus Johnson	F	1963–1972^{1}	December 13, 1986
41	Wes Unseld	C^{3}	1968–1981^{4}	November 3, 1981
45	Phil Chenier	G^{5}	1971–1979^{6}	March 23, 2018

Notes:

- ^{1} All in Baltimore
- ^{2} 1972–1973 in Baltimore
- ^{3} Also served as coach (1987–1994)
- ^{4} 1968–1973 in Baltimore
- ^{5} Also served as Bullets/Wizards television color analyst (1984–2017)
- ^{6} 1971–1973 in Baltimore
- The NBA retired Bill Russell's No. 6 for all its member teams on August 11, 2022.

=== Basketball Hall of Fame members ===
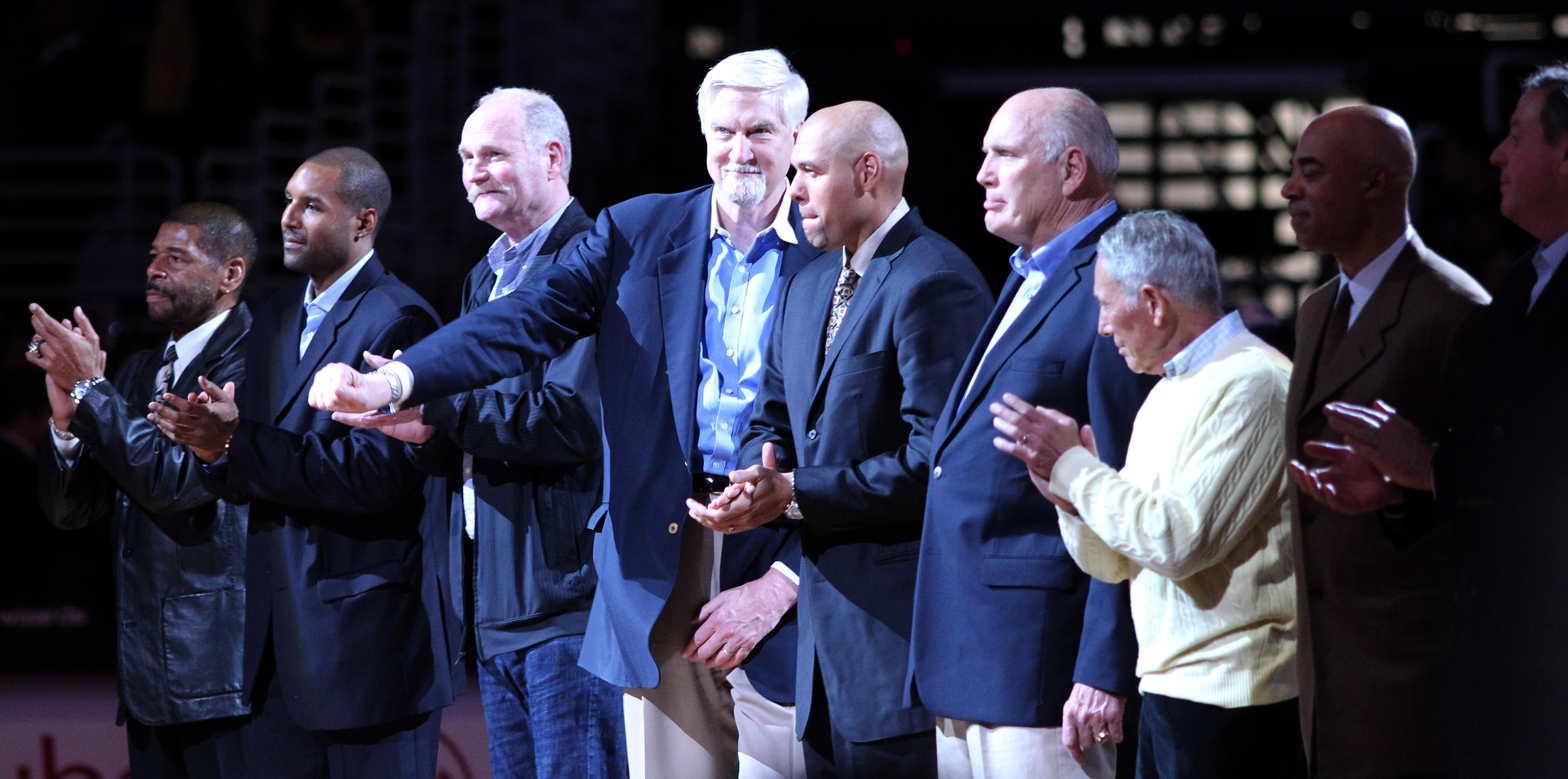
Former Bullets players honored during a Wizards game in March 2012 at the Verizon Center

Washington Wizards Hall of Fame members
Players
No.	Name	Position	Tenure	Inducted
41	Wes Unseld ^{1}	C/F	1968–1981	1988
10; 33	Earl Monroe	G	1967–1971	1990
11	Elvin Hayes	C/F	1972–1981	1990
21	Dave Bing	G	1975–1977	1990
8	Walt Bellamy ^{2}	C	1961–1965	1993
15	Bailey Howell	F/G	1964–1966	1997
4	Moses Malone	C/F	1986–1988	2001
23	Michael Jordan ^{3}	G/F	2001–2003	2009
25	Gus Johnson	F/C	1963–1972	2010
50	Ralph Sampson	C/C	1991	2012
30	Bernard King	F	1987–1993	2013
2	Mitch Richmond	G	1998–2001	2014
24	Spencer Haywood	F/C	1981–1983	2015
10	Bob Dandridge	F/G	1977–1981	2021
2; 4	Chris Webber	F/C	1994–1998	2021
30	Ben Wallace	C/F	1996–1999	2021
34	Paul Pierce	F	2014–2015	2021
21	Dwight Howard	C	2018–2019	2025
Coaches
Name		Position	Tenure	Inducted
21	Bobby Leonard ^{4}	Head coach	1962–1964	2014
Contributors
Name		Position	Tenure	Inducted
44	Rod Thorn ^{5}	G	1963–1964	2018
Doug Collins		Head coach	2001–2003	2024

Notes:

- ^{1} He also coached the team in 1987–1994
- ^{2} In total, Bellamy was inducted into the Hall of Fame twice – as player and as a member of the 1960 Olympic team
- ^{3} In total, Jordan was inducted into the Hall of Fame twice – as player and as a member of the 1992 Olympic team
- ^{4} He also played for the team from 1961 to 1963
- ^{5} Thorn was inducted as a contributor

=== FIBA Hall of Fame members ===
Washington Wizards Hall of Fame members
Players
No.	Name	Position	Tenure	Inducted
10	Andrew Gaze	G	1994	2013
23	Michael Jordan ^{1}	G/F	2001–2003	2015
21	Fabricio Oberto	C	2009–2010	2019

Notes:

- ^{1} In total, Jordan was inducted into the FIBA Hall of Fame twice – as player and as a member of the 1992 Olympic team

== Individual records and awards ==
=== Franchise leaders ===
Bold denotes still active with team.

Italic denotes still active but not with team. Points scored (regular season) (as of the end of the 2025–26 season)

1. Elvin Hayes (15,551)
2. Bradley Beal (15,391)
3. Jeff Malone (11,083)
4. John Wall (10,879)
5. Wes Unseld (10,624)
6. Kevin Loughery (9,833)
7. Gus Johnson (9,781)
8. Phil Chenier (9,778)
9. Walt Bellamy (9,020)
10. Gilbert Arenas (8,930)
11. Antawn Jamison (8,736)
12. Greg Ballard (8,706)
13. Juwan Howard (8,530)
14. Jack Marin (8,017)
15. Earl Monroe (7,775)
16. Bernard King (6,516)
17. Kevin Grevey (6,442)
18. Caron Butler (5,889)
19. Jeff Ruland (5,653)
20. Harvey Grant (5,445)

Other statistics (regular season) (as of the end of the 2025–26 season)

Most minutes played
Player	Minutes
Wes Unseld	35,832
Elvin Hayes	29,218
Bradley Beal	24,091
John Wall	20,545
Gus Johnson	19,723
Greg Ballard	18,687
Kevin Loughery	18,677
Phil Chenier	18,654
Jeff Malone	17,984
Juwan Howard	17,845

Most rebounds
Player	Rebounds
Wes Unseld	13,769
Elvin Hayes	9,305
Gus Johnson	7,243
Walt Bellamy	5,438
Greg Ballard	4,094
Antawn Jamison	3,735
Marcin Gortat	3,697
Brendan Haywood	3,648
Juwan Howard	3,448
Jeff Ruland	3,285

Most assists
Player	Assists
John Wall	5,282
Wes Unseld	3,822
Bradley Beal	2,972
Rod Strickland	2,712
Kevin Porter	2,593
Kevin Loughery	2,363
Gilbert Arenas	2,046
Frank Johnson	1,961
Michael Adams	1,844
Darrell Walker	1,707

Most steals
Player	Steals
John Wall	976
Bradley Beal	772
Greg Ballard	762
Elvin Hayes	736
Phil Chenier	667
Gilbert Arenas	636
Wes Unseld	628
Caron Butler	563
Rod Strickland	482
Antawn Jamison	469

Most blocks
Player	Blocks
Elvin Hayes	1,558
Charles Jones	1,051
Manute Bol	908
Brendan Haywood	865
Rick Mahorn	557
Pervis Ellison	492
JaVale McGee	470
Marcin Gortat	449
Gheorghe Mureșan	443
Etan Thomas	407

Most three-pointers made
Player	3-pointers made
Bradley Beal	1,514
Gilbert Arenas	868
Antawn Jamison	646
Corey Kispert	609
John Wall	539
Chris Whitney	489
Otto Porter Jr.	488
Kyle Kuzma	484
Jordan Poole	419
Dāvis Bertāns	415

=== Individual awards ===
NBA Most Valuable Player

- Wes Unseld – 1969

NBA Finals MVP

- Wes Unseld – 1978

NBA Rookie of the Year

- Walt Bellamy – 1962
- Terry Dischinger – 1963
- Earl Monroe – 1968
- Wes Unseld – 1969

NBA Most Improved Player

- Pervis Ellison – 1992
- Don MacLean – 1994
- Gheorghe Mureșan – 1996

NBA Coach of the Year

- Gene Shue – 1969, 1982

NBA Executive of the Year

- Bob Ferry – 1979, 1982

J. Walter Kennedy Citizenship Award

- Wes Unseld – 1975
- Dave Bing – 1977

NBA Community Assist Award

- John Wall – 2016
- Bradley Beal – 2019

All-NBA First Team

- Earl Monroe – 1969
- Wes Unseld – 1969
- Elvin Hayes – 1975, 1977, 1979

All-NBA Second Team

- Gus Johnson – 1965, 1966, 1970, 1971
- Archie Clark – 1972
- Elvin Hayes – 1973, 1974, 1976
- Phil Chenier – 1975
- Bob Dandridge – 1979
- Moses Malone – 1987
- Rod Strickland – 1998
- Gilbert Arenas – 2007

All-NBA Third Team

- Bernard King – 1991
- Juwan Howard – 1996
- Gilbert Arenas – 2005, 2006
- John Wall – 2017
- Bradley Beal – 2021

NBA All-Defensive First Team

- Gus Johnson – 1970, 1971
- Bob Dandridge – 1979
- Larry Hughes – 2005

NBA All-Defensive Second Team

- Mike Riordan – 1973
- Elvin Hayes – 1975
- Manute Bol – 1986
- John Wall – 2015

NBA All-Rookie First Team

- Terry Dischinger – 1963
- Rod Thorn – 1964
- Gus Johnson – 1964
- Wali Jones – 1965
- Jack Marin – 1967
- Earl Monroe – 1968
- Wes Unseld – 1969
- Mike Davis – 1970
- Phil Chenier – 1972
- Nick Weatherspoon – 1974
- Mitch Kupchak – 1977
- Jeff Ruland- 1982
- Jeff Malone – 1984
- Tom Gugliotta – 1993
- John Wall – 2011
- Bradley Beal – 2013
- Alex Sarr – 2025

NBA All-Rookie Second Team

- Larry Stewart – 1992
- Juwan Howard – 1995
- Rasheed Wallace – 1996
- Courtney Alexander – 2001
- Jarvis Hayes – 2004
- Rui Hachimura – 2020
- Bub Carrington – 2025

=== NBA All-Star weekend ===
**NBA All-Star Game**

- Walt Bellamy – 1962*, 1963*, 1964*, 1965
- Terry Dischinger – 1963, 1964
- Gus Johnson – 1965, 1968, 1969, 1970, 1971
- Don Ohl – 1965, 1966, 1967
- Bailey Howell – 1966*
- Earl Monroe – 1969*, 1971*
- Wes Unseld – 1969, 1971, 1972, 1973, 1975
- Archie Clark – 1972
- Jack Marin – 1972
- Elvin Hayes – 1973, 1974, 1975*, 1976*, 1977, 1978, 1979, 1980
- Phil Chenier – 1974, 1975, 1977
- Dave Bing – 1976*
- Bob Dandridge – 1979
- Jeff Ruland – 1984, 1985
- Jeff Malone – 1986, 1987
- Moses Malone – 1987*, 1988*
- Bernard King – 1991*
- Michael Adams – 1992
- Juwan Howard – 1996
- Chris Webber – 1997
- Michael Jordan – 2002*, 2003*
- Gilbert Arenas – 2005, 2006, 2007*
- Antawn Jamison – 2005, 2008
- Caron Butler – 2007, 2008
- John Wall – 2014, 2015*, 2016, 2017, 2018
- Bradley Beal – 2018, 2019, 2021*

* Starter

**NBA All-Star Game head coaches**

- Gene Shue – 1969
- K. C. Jones – 1975
- Dick Motta – 1979
- Eddie Jordan – 2007

**Three-Point shootout**

- Tim Legler – 1996 (1st), 1997 (2nd)
- Tracy Murray – 1998 (8th)
- Gilbert Arenas – 2006 (2nd), 2007 (5th)
- Bradley Beal – 2014 (2nd), 2018 (5th)
- Dāvis Bertāns – 2020 (3rd)

**Slam Dunk Contest**

- JaVale McGee – 2011
- John Wall – 2014

**Skills Challenge**

- Gilbert Arenas – 2005 (4th)
- John Wall – 2011, 2012, 2017

**Rookie/Rising Stars Challenge**

- Calbert Cheaney – 1994
- Juwan Howard – 1995
- Anthony Tucker – 1995
- Rasheed Wallace – 1996
- Richard Hamilton – 2001 (S)
- Brendan Haywood – 2002 (R)
- Jarvis Hayes – 2004 (S)
- John Wall – 2011 (R), 2012 (S)
- Bradley Beal – 2013 (S), 2014 (S)
- Moritz Wagner – 2020 (R)
- Rui Hachimura – 2020 (R), 2021 (R)
- Deni Avdija – 2021 (S)
- Bilal Coulibaly – 2024 (R)

**Rookie/Rising Stars Challenge MVP**

- John Wall – 2011 (R)

== See also ==
- Sports in Washington, D.C.

== Notes and references ==
Preceded by Portland Trail Blazers	NBA champions 1977–78	Succeeded by Seattle SuperSonics
