= It ain't over till the fat lady sings =

Colloquialism

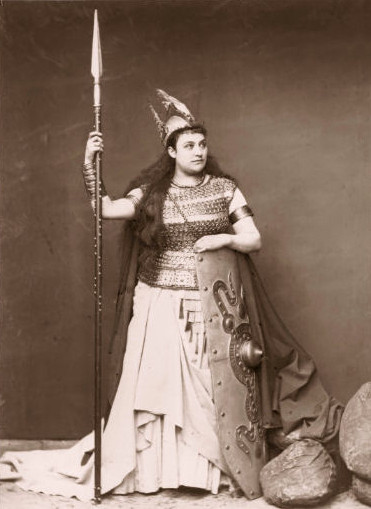
Amalie Materna as the valkyrie Brünnhilde (1876)

"It ain't over till (or until) the fat lady sings" is a colloquialism which is often used as a proverb. It means that one should not presume to know the outcome of an event which is still in progress. More specifically, the phrase is used when a situation is (or appears to be) nearing its conclusion. It cautions against assuming that the current state of an event is irreversible and clearly determines how or when the event will end. The phrase is most commonly used in association with organized competitions, particularly sports.

== Definition ==
The phrase is generally understood to be a reference to opera sopranos, who were typically heavyset. The imagery of Wagner's opera cycle Der Ring des Nibelungen and its last part, Götterdämmerung, is typically used in depictions accompanying uses of the phrase. The "fat lady" is thus the valkyrie Brünnhilde, who was traditionally presented as a very buxom lady. Her farewell scene lasts almost twenty minutes and leads directly to the finale of the whole Ring Cycle. As Götterdämmerung is about the end of the world (or at least the world of the Norse gods), in a very significant way "it is [all] over when the fat lady sings."

== Attribution ==
The first known use in media appeared in the Dallas Morning News on March 10, 1976:

Despite his obvious allegiance to the Red Raiders, Texas Tech sports information director Ralph Carpenter was the picture of professional objectivity when the Aggies rallied for a 72–72 tie late in the SWC basketball tournament finals. "Hey, Ralph," said Bill Morgan, "this... is going to be a tight one after all." "Right", said Ralph, "the opera ain’t over until the fat lady sings."

In the same newspaper on November 26, 2006, Steve Blow followed up the discovery by contacting Bill Morgan about the incident:

Bill vividly remembers the comment and the uproar it caused throughout the press box. He always assumed it was coined on the spot. "Oh, yeah, it was vintage Carpenter. He was one of the world’s funniest guys," said Bill, a contender for that title himself.

The 1976 use of the phrase was discovered by Fred R. Shapiro, who published it in The Yale Book of Quotations. It had previously been attributed to sportswriter and broadcaster Dan Cook, who used the phrase after the first basketball game between the San Antonio Spurs and the Washington Bullets (later the Washington Wizards) during the 1978 NBA Playoffs. Cook used the line to illustrate that while the Spurs had won once, the series was not over yet. Shapiro called this a notable example of misattribution.

== Phrases with similar meanings ==
- "Gün doğmadan neler doğar" is a Turkish saying that means "Anything can happen before sunrise" to express "Don't let your hopes gone, keep them alive, you never know what will happen till the next step completely done"
- "The game isn't over until the final out" is an older aphorism pertaining to baseball, meaning that even if one team is behind, they always have a chance of winning until the third out of the final inning completes the game.
- "It ain't over till it's over", a variation of the above phrase popularized by baseball player Yogi Berra.
- "Don't count your chickens before they hatch", a well-known saying which originated in the 16th century.
- "The future isn't carved in stone", "nothing is carved in stone" or "it isn't carved in stone" is a phrase meaning that the future can always be changed.
- Non dire gatto se non ce l'hai nel sacco, once cited in English as "Don't say cat if you don't have it in the sack [bag]," is an Italian saying used in informal and funny contexts, popularized by football trainer Giovanni Trapattoni.
- Lopta je okrugla, cited in Croatian as "Ball is round" which is often said during football games, meaning that any outcome is possible and there is no predetermined winner of the match.
- Die Hoffnung stirbt zuletzt is a German saying, meaning "Hope dies last".
- Du sollst den Tag nicht vor dem Abend loben is another German saying, meaning "Don't praise the day before the evening."
- Ещё не вечер (pronounced "Yeshcho ne vecher") is a Russian saying. It translates to "It isn't yet evening", but other than the similar German saying above, it can also be used in case the speaker still hopes for something good to happen.
- C'est pas fini tant que c'est pas fini is a French expression meaning nothing is over before it is; C'est à la fin de la foire qu'on compte les bouses is a proverb saying the same in a more colourful manner ("Wait until the end of market to count the cowpats"), or, similarly, C’est à la fin du bal qu’on paie les musiciens ("Wait until the end of dance party to pay the musicians").
- Parijs is nog ver (It's still a long way to Paris) are famous words of the Dutch cyclist and Tour de France winner Joop Zoetemelk, indicating that everything still can change as long as the race hasn't finished.
- Neperšokęs griovio, nesakyk "op" is a Lithuanian saying (Do not say "hop", until you have jumped over the moat"), meaning that one should not get ahead of themselves and proclaim the outcome of a process that has not yet ended.
- Até ao lavar dos cestos é vindima (The grape harvest is only over once the baskets have been cleaned) is a Portuguese proverb that means the final outcome is only fully known at the end of a process.
