= Dan Cook =

American newspaper sports writer (1926–2008)

- Born: August 12, 1926; Houston, Texas, U.S.
- Died: July 3, 2008 (aged 81); San Antonio, Texas, U.S.
- Occupations: Sports writer Sports telecaster
- Known for: "The opera ain't over till the fat lady sings"

Daniel John Cook Jr. (August 12, 1926 – July 3, 2008) was a sports writer for the San Antonio Express-News for 51 years. He is most notable for making the phrase "the opera ain't over till the fat lady sings" into common use. Described as a "sports icon", Cook started working at KENS in 1956 and continued to work at the television station until 2000. For most of these years, the TV station was owned by the San Antonio Express-News.

== Career ==
After beginning his sports writing career at the Houston Post, Cook worked at the San Antonio Express-News from August 14, 1952, until he retired on August 3, 2003. In early 1956, he first made national headlines when, acting on a tip, he confronted a suspect in a Houston robbery and in the process wound up himself arrested and charged with armed robbery. (He would later be exonerated when the suspect confessed to the original crime.) Cook wrote his first sports column for the San Antonio Express-News on November 29, 1956. During his newspaper career, he became in charge of editing the sports column in 1960 and held this role until 1975. Outside of the Express-News, Cook continued his sports career on the radio and television.

=== The phrase ===
In 1976, Ralph Carpenter of Texas Tech University coined "the opera ain't over until the fat lady sings". The phrase became common use after Cook and Dick Motta used it during the 1978 NBA playoffs.

=== Honors and awards ===
On March 1, 1996, Cook was inducted into the San Antonio Sports Hall of Fame for his work as a columnist and a broadcaster.

== Personal life ==
Cook was born and raised in Houston, Texas. He graduated St. Thomas High School in Houston and attended the University of Houston for two years. He was married and had three children.

== Death ==
Cook died on the night of July 3, 2008, after a long illness.

== Partial bibliography ==
- Cook, Dan (November 2001). The Best of Dan Cook, 1956-1990. Corona Publishing. pp. 245pp. ISBN 978-0-931722-15-8.
