= Iron and steel industry in the United States =

Overview of the iron and steel industry of the United States

The U.S. is the third-largest producer of raw steel worldwide, after China and India, and is ranked sixth in pig iron production. In 2024, the industry produced over 79 million net tons of crude steel. Approximately 25% of the steel used in the U.S. is imported.

Major steel-makers in the United States include Cleveland-Cliffs, Commercial Metals Company, Nucor, Steel Dynamics, Nippon Steel, and Carpenter Technology Corporation.

Employment as of 2014 was 149,000 people employed in iron and steel mills, and 69,000 in foundries. The value of iron and steel produced in 2014 was $113 billion. As of 2020, about 0.3% of the US population is employed by the steel industry, and by 2025 steel mills were only employing 83,600 people, making the industry a relatively small portion of US manufacturing despite outsize political influence.

== Types of steel mills ==
Steel mills in the U.S. fall into two categories: traditional integrated mills that process iron ore into steel and mini-mills that melt steel scrap to produce new steel. Mini-mills now dominate U.S. steel production.

=== Integrated steel mills ===
In 2017, there were 9 operating integrated steel mills in the United States (plus one idled), down from 13 in 2000. Integrated mills produced 31% of the steel produced in the US.

In an integrated steel mill, iron ore is reduced to metallic iron. In the US, this is done in blast furnaces and since 2014 again using direct reduced iron furnaces in Nucor's plant in Louisiana as well as another DRI plant (producing a compactified version of DRI called hot briquetted iron, or HBI) in Texas by Voestalpine. Some of the iron from the blast furnaces is converted to steel; today this is done in basic oxygen furnaces. Iron ore, coke, and flux are fed into the blast furnace and heated. The coke reduces the iron oxide in the ore to metallic iron, and the molten mass separates into slag and iron. Some of the iron from the blast furnace is cooled, and marketed as pig iron; the rest flows into basic oxygen furnaces, where it is converted into steel. Iron and steel scrap may be added to both the blast furnace and the basic iron furnace.

US Steel operates a number of integrated steel mills, including the Gary Works in Gary, Indiana. They also operate the Edgar Thomson Works, which is the iron- and steel-making unit of the Mon Valley Works, which includes three other related plants. The company operates the Great Lakes Works, and Granite City Works.

Cleveland-Cliffs operates every integrated steel mill: in East Chicago, Indiana, Burns Harbor, Indiana, and Cleveland, Ohio.

The Ashland Works was demolished.

Current integrated steel mills in the US

Name	Location	Owner	Status and Date
Gary Works	Gary, Indiana	US Steel	Operating, February 2015
Mon Valley Works - Irvin Plant, Edgar Thomson Steel Works	North Braddock, Pennsylvania	US Steel	
Indiana Harbor Works	East Chicago, Indiana	Cleveland-Cliffs	
Burns Harbor Works	Burns Harbor, Indiana	Cleveland-Cliffs	
Middletown Works	Middletown, Ohio	Cleveland-Cliffs	
Cleveland Works	Cleveland, Ohio	Cleveland-Cliffs	
Dearborn Works	Dearborn, Michigan	Cleveland-Cliffs	One operating blast furnace ("A") Formerly Severstal Dearborn (2004–2014) Previously Rouge Steel (1989–2004) Previously Ford Rouge Plant (1910–1989)
Great Lakes Works	River Rouge and Ecorse, Michigan	US Steel	Blast furnace and iron production idled December 2019. Automotive finishing lines remain open as of 2024.
Granite City Works	Granite City, Illinois	US Steel	Resumed operation 2018 Idled indefinitely in 2023.
Fairfield Works	Fairfield, Alabama	US Steel	Blast furnace closed permanently in August 2015. Electric arc furnace opened in 2020 and is currently operating as of 2024.

=== Specialty steel mills / minimills ===
There were about 112 minimills or specialty mills in the US, which in 2013 produced 59% of US total steel production. The specialty mills use iron and steel scrap, rather than iron ore, as feedstock, and melt the scrap in electric furnaces.

Notable Specialty and Mini-Mills in the US

Name	Location	Owner	Status and Date
Brackenridge Works	Brackenridge, Pennsylvania	Allegheny Technologies	
former Colorado Fuel and Iron plant	Pueblo, Colorado	Oregon Steel Mills	Former integrated mill
Evraz Claymont Steel	Claymont, Delaware	Evraz Group	Closed
Mississippi Steel	Flowood, Mississippi	Nucor	
Butler Works	Butler, Pennsylvania	Cleveland-Cliffs, Inc.	Grain Oriented Electrical Steel

== Raw materials ==
The two main inputs into iron- and steel-making are a source of iron and a source of energy. Additional requirements are a fluxing material to remove the impurities, and alloy metals to give particular properties to the metal.

Raw materials used in US iron and steel production, 2012

Input	metric tons	Purpose
Iron ore	46,900,000	Iron source
Iron and steel scrap	104,100,000	Iron source
Coke	9,490,000	Reducing agent
Lime	5,730,000	Flux
Fluorspar	47,800	Flux
Manganese	382,000	Alloy
Chromium	251,000	Alloy
Nickel	194,000	Alloy
Molybdenum	11,800	Alloy
Vanadium	2,500	Alloy
Tungsten	123	Alloy
Source: US Geological Survey, Minerals Yearbooks, 2012 and 2013.

=== Iron and steel scrap ===
Two-thirds of the iron and steel produced in the US is made from recycled scrap, rather than from iron ore. In 2014, 81 million mt of iron and steel were produced from scrap. Most steel from scrap is produced using electric arc furnaces.

=== Coke ===
Coke, derived from coking coal, reduces iron ore (iron oxides) to metallic iron.

=== Flux ===
Flux materials, like lime, are added to the furnace to lower the melting point and remove impurities as slag. Other common fluxes include dolomite, soda ash, and fluorspar.

=== Alloy metals ===
Other metals are commonly added to steel to produce alloy steels of various types. Common alloy metals are manganese, nickel, molybdenum, chromium, and vanadium. Stainless steel commonly contains a minimum of 10.5% chromium, and may also contain significant amounts of nickel or molybdenum.

=== Slag ===
Slag, a byproduct of iron and steel-making composed primarily of highly impure glass, would normally be a waste product. However, it is in demand as an aggregate in concrete, asphalt paving, and construction fill. In 2014, the industry produced and marketed about 16.0 million mt of slag, worth an estimated $270 million.

== International trade ==
Since the 1960s, the U.S. has been a major importer of steel. In 2014, it exported 11 million tons but imported 39 million tons, with net imports making up 17% of consumption.

Imports by Top 10 source countries YTD through December 2017
No.	Country	Volume (metric tons)	Percent	Value (k$)	Percent
1	Canada	5,675,816	16%	5,119,944	18%
2	Brazil	4,665,428	14%	2,442,468	8%
3	South Korea	3,401,405	10%	2,785,764	10%
4	Mexico	3,155,117	9%	2,501,226	9%
5	Russia	2,866,695	8%	1,431,273	5%
6	Turkey	1,977,866	6%	1,182,998	4%
7	Japan	1,727,844	5%	1,657,908	6%
8	Germany	1,380,434	4%	1,833,793	6%
9	Taiwan	1,128,356	3%	1,261,033	4%
10	India	743,021	2%	732,425	3%
Others		7,750,525	22%	8,189,503	28%
Total		34,472,507	100%	29,138,335	100%

Since the 1800s, the US steel industry has generally had a history of supporting tariffs on foreign steel imports, which Bloomberg has described as a "the reward delivered...in a patronage system" tied to a general tendency for heavy industry to favor economic protectionism. Presidents from both the Republican and Democratic parties have been known to cooperate with these demands. This has been cited as a contributing factor in Biden administration's skepticism towards the 2023-2024 proposed acquisition of U.S. Steel by Nippon Steel.

Tariffs instituted during the first term of President Donald Trump starting in 2019, which some of the biggest corporate steel buyers in the country criticized for their inclusion of exemptions, succeeded at increasing investment in the country's steel industry, but did not fare well in terms of job creation. Bloomberg has also argued that evidence suggests those tariffs led to a recession in the US manufacturing industry as a whole via rising prices.

Following the 2024 U.S. presidential election, the U.S. steel industry actively advocated for stronger trade protections, including reimposing tariffs on steel imports from the United Kingdom, European Union, and Japan to address trade-distorting practices. The industry argued that steel tariffs imposed in 2018 boosted steel prices, profits, and employment. They have also publicly called for stricter enforcement of trade laws and increased tariffs on steel-intensive products from China and Southeast Asia.

== Lobbying ==
Groups that lobby for the US steel industry in Washington include The Coalition for a Prosperous America and the Alliance for American Manufacturing

== History of US iron- and steel-making ==
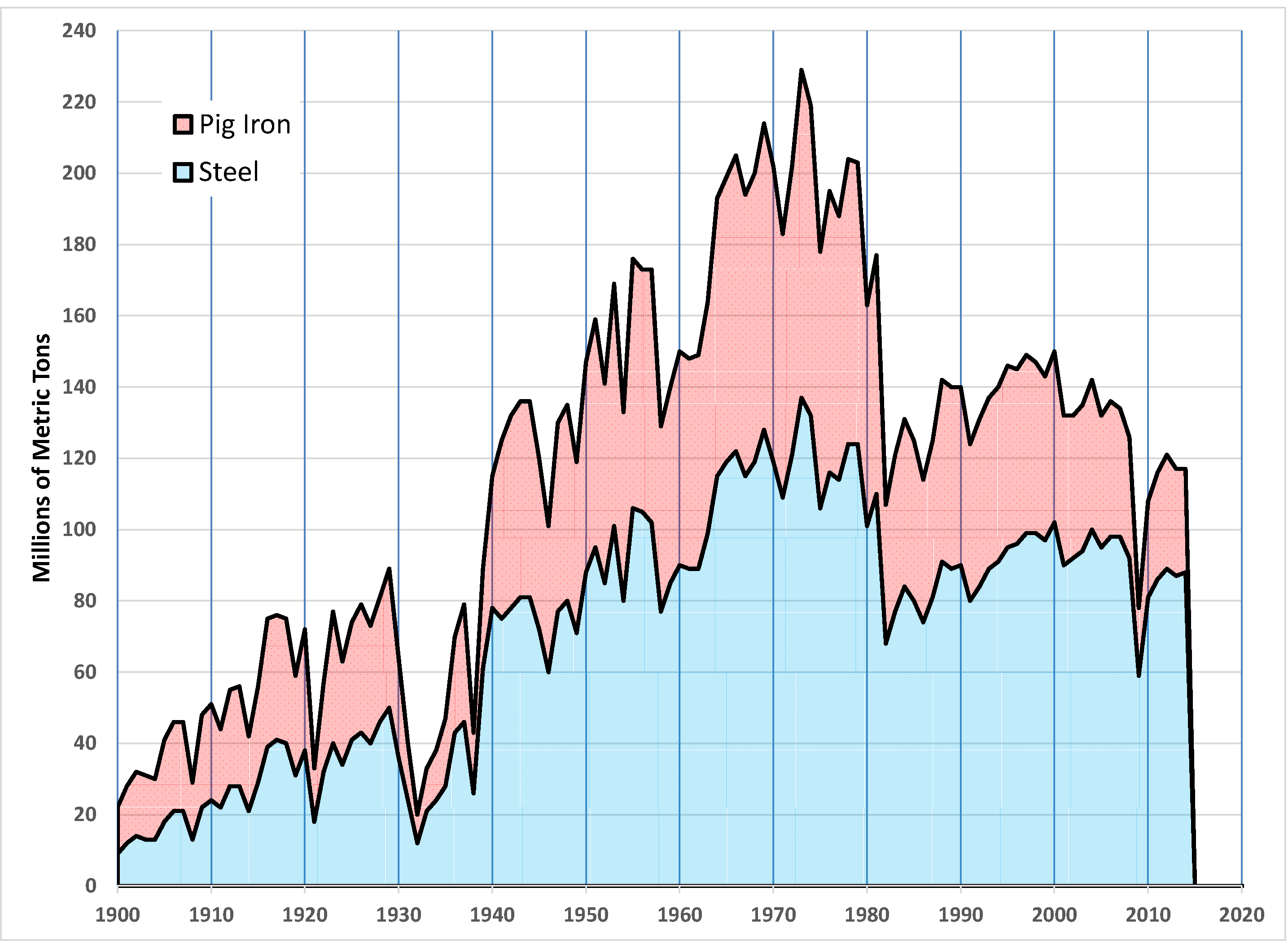
Graph of US iron and steel production, 1900–2014, data from USGS

The US iron and steel industry has paralleled the industry in other countries in technological developments. In the 1800s, the US switched from charcoal to coke in ore smelting, adopted the Bessemer process, and saw the rise of very large integrated steel mills. In the 20th century, the US industry successively adopted the open hearth process, then the basic oxygen furnace. Since the American industry peaked in the 1940s and 1950s, the US industry has shifted to small mini-mills and specialty mills, using iron and steel scrap as feedstock, rather than iron ore.

== See also ==
- History of the iron and steel industry in the United States
- Steelmaking
- Steel mill
