= List of economic advisors to Donald Trump =

As part of Donald Trump's 2016 presidential campaign, various economists and businesspeople have served both in a formal and an informal capacity, to advise Trump on macroeconomics and associated government policy decisions. During the 2016 transition to the presidency, Trump gained additional advisors, and after the inauguration some of his advisors will officially become part of the Trump administration (including the NEC, NTC, advisors, czars, counselors, OMB, CEA, Treasury, Commerce, USTR, SBA, SEC, and the Fed) while others will remain in the private sector as informal advisors with varying degrees of influence.

== During his first presidential campaign ==
Trump released initial details of his economic policies when his campaign officially began in June 2015, and more details during the first Republican debates which began in August 2015. Although critical of certain aspects of Trump's early economic plans, especially increasing tariffs as opposed to free trade policies, Larry Kudlow and Steve Moore would eventually agree to join the Trump campaign as advisors. Although most presidential candidates had announced a team of formal economic advisors by October 2015, at the time Trump still primarily relied upon his business background to inform his economic plan (Carly Fiorina was the other candidate who relied primarily upon her own background in business in the early phases of the campaign). In addition to his own business expertise, Trump had a network of contacts that sometimes served as informal economic advisors during his campaign, including Carl Icahn. Even as late as July 2016, however, Kudlow and Moore were still not official advisors, despite having already helped craft some of Trump's policy-positions related to taxation for instance.

=== During the general election ===
Trump released a list of his campaign's official economic advisers in August 2016, which was significantly anti-establishment and therefore included few people with any governmental experience, yet at the same time aimed to include some of the elites of business and finance, primarily people with well-known names.

Although most of the names were new, existing Trump advisers David Malpass, Peter Navarro, Stephen Moore, and Dan DiMicco were also on the list, formally led by Stephen Miller, the national policy director, and directly led by deputy policy director Dan Kowalski. The Trump'16 finance director Steven Mnuchin was also listed, and played a role in helping coordinate the group. Many of the names on the original list, or on the subsequent expansions thereof, received media attention as potential appointees to the presidential Council of Economic Advisers, or in other Trump administration roles. As of August 2016, Trump's economic advisors included:

- Tom Barrack, CEO of Colony Capital, 2017 inauguration chair, former Treasury contender, major donor
- Andy Beal, banker, billionaire, professional poker player, major donor
- Stephen Calk, CEO of the Federal Savings Bank, officer and helicopter pilot in the U.S. Army
- Dan DiMicco, former CEO of Nucor, Commerce/CEA/USTR contender
- Steve Feinberg, CEO of Cerberus Capital, major donor
- Harold Hamm, oil and gas industry, billionaire, former Energy/Interior contender
- Kathleen Hartnett-White, former EPA/Interior contender, a director at the Texas Public Policy Foundation, former head of the Texas Commission on Environmental Quality
- Diane Hendricks, chair of ABC Supply, billionaire, originally backed Walker'16
- Darlene Jordan, former assistant attorney general of Massachusetts
- Dan Kowalski, former deputy staff director for the Senate Budget Committee 2009-2015 and House Budget Committee staffer 1998-2007, co-lead of the Trump'16 economic advisers team, Trump'16 deputy director of policy, on the Trump OMB transition team
- Howard Lorber, CEO of Vector Group, major donor
- David Malpass, Fed/OMB/USTR contender
- Ted Malloch, author, consultant, and television producer
- Betsy McCaughey, former lieutenant governor of New York, divorced spouse of Wilbur Ross
- Stephen Miller, Trump'16 director of policy, Sr. Advisor appointee
- Steven Mnuchin, founder of hedge fund Dune Capital Management, former Goldman Sachs employee, Trump'16 finance chair, major donor, Treasury-designate
- Stephen Moore, founding president of the Club for Growth, CEA contender
- Peter Navarro, business school professor at UC-Irvine, CEA contender
- John Paulson, CEO of investment firm Paulson & Co.
- Brooke Rollins, CEO of Texas Public Policy Foundation, former deputy general counsel under Governor Rick Perry
- Wilbur Ross, billionaire investor, Commerce-designate, divorced spouse of Betsy McCaughey
- Steve Roth, chair of Vornado Realty Trust (although on the list of advisers in August 2016, Roth said in September 2016 he was no longer spending any time on the effort)
- Carla Sands, philanthropist and chair of Vintage Capital
- Anthony Scaramucci, founder of SkyBridge Capital, former Goldman Sachs employee
- Judy Shelton, Fed Vice-chair contender, possible future Fed Chair contender, former advisor to Carson'16, director of the Sound Money Project at the Atlas Network, economist with a Ph.D. in business administration from University of Utah, noted for her 1989 book The Coming Soviet Crash
- Liz Uihlein, president of Uline

Several of the advisors were major donors to Trump's presidential campaign.

At first, only one of Trump's initial list of a dozen official advisors, Peter Navarro, had a PhD in economics. Although he had been in contact with Trump since 2011, Navarro had never met nor spoken with Trump directly in August 2016, but began to meet with Trump in person late in the 2016 campaign. A few days after Navarro was announced, Trump added Judy Shelton, an economist with a Ph.D in business administration to his team.

== As president-elect in 2016 ==
As of December 2016, many of the advisors during the campaign listed above are under consideration for cabinet-level roles or other high-level roles in the Trump administration. (For instance, Navarro is a contender for the CEA chair, and Shelton is a contender for Fed Vice-chair.)

=== Informal presidential advisors ===
In addition to his statutory advisory groups, Trump is also organizing efforts to directly communicate with business leaders.

==== Technology industry ====
Billionaire venture capitalist Peter Thiel originally backed fellow Californian and tech industry candidate Carly Fiorina, but implicitly endorsed Trump in May 2016, then spoke at the Republican National Convention that July. Thiel donated over a million dollars in October 2016. A few days after the general election, Thiel joined the executive committee of the Trump transition team, although Thiel said he was not seeking a full-time Trump administration position.

In addition to bringing some of his tech industry contacts to the Trump team, Thiel, along with Trump's son-in-law Jared Kushner and incoming White House chief of staff Reince Priebus, helped organize a technology-CEO meeting in December 2016 for Trump and Pence, as well as a handful of appointees and transition team members.

Attendee	Net worth	Position and company	Market cap	Trump administration
Jeff Bezos	$66,400 million	CEO of Amazon and Blue Origin	$372 billion	private sector
Larry Page	$39,500 million	CEO of Alphabet (Google parent)	$560 billion	private sector
Eric Schmidt	$11,500 million	Chairman of Alphabet (Google parent)	$560 billion	private sector
Donald Trump	$3,700 million	Owner of The Trump Organization	unspecified	President
Wilbur Ross	$2,900 million	Former co-CEO at Invesco	$12 billion	Commerce
Peter Thiel	$2,700 million	Chairman of Palantir	$20 billion (private)	transition team
Alex Karp	$1,600 million	CEO of Palantir	$20 billion (private)	private sector
Sheryl Sandberg	$1,270 million	COO of Facebook	$354 billion	private sector
Tim Cook	$785 million	CEO of Apple	$624 billion	private sector
Safra Catz	$525 million	CEO of Oracle Corp	$169 billion	private sector
Gary Cohn	$266 million	Former president of Goldman Sachs	$93 billion	Director N.E.C.
Jared Kushner	$200 million	Owner of Kushner Companies	unspecified	transition team
Ivanka Trump	$150 million	Co-heir of The Trump Organization	(see Donald Trump)	transition team
Donald Trump Jr.	$150 million	Co-heir & EVP of The Trump Organization	(see Donald Trump)	transition team
Eric Trump	$150 million	Co-heir & EVP of The Trump Organization	(see Donald Trump)	transition team
Satya Nadella	$84 million	CEO of Microsoft	$494 billion	private sector
Brad Smith	$58 million	President of Microsoft	$494 billion	private sector
Ginni Rometty	$45 million	CEO of IBM	$163 billion	private sector
Chuck Robbins	$13 million	CEO of Cisco	$155 billion	private sector
Brian Krzanich	$12 million	CEO of Intel	$177 billion	private sector
Steve Bannon	$10 million	Former chairman of Breitbart	unspecified	Strategist
Mike Pence	unknown	Former governor of Indiana	(n/a)	Vice president
Reince Priebus	unknown	Former RNC chairman	(n/a)	Chief of Staff
Stephen Miller	unknown	Former comms. dir. for Jeff Sessions	(n/a)	Sr. Advisor

Airbnb was also invited to attend the tech-CEO meeting, but their CEO was traveling internationally that week.

The details of the December 2016 meeting were not made public, but according to anonymous sources, reforming the H1B visa program was discussed.

Of the above, Stephen Bannon resigned on 18 August 2017; Reince Prebus was fired on 11 March 2017.

==== Business-oriented strategy and policy group ====
In addition to the tech-industry group, there is also a more general business advisory group being formed. Billionaire Stephen Schwarzman of Blackstone organized the business advisory group, which also includes:

- Paul Atkins, former SEC commissioner
- Mary Barra, CEO of GM
- Toby Cosgrove, CEO of Cleveland Clinic
- Jamie Dimon, CEO of JPMorgan Chase
- Larry Fink, CEO of BlackRock
- Travis Kalanick, former CEO of Uber (December 2016-February 2017 resignation)
- Rich Lesser, CEO of BCG
- Doug McMillon, CEO of Wal-Mart
- Jim McNerney, former CEO of Boeing
- Elon Musk (December 2016-June 2017 resignation)
- Indra Nooyi, CEO of PepsiCo
- Bayo Ogunlesi, chair of Global Infrastructure Partners
- Ginni Rometty, CEO of IBM, also attended tech-CEO meeting
- Kevin Warsh, former FRB member
- Mark Weinberger, CEO of EY
- Jack Welch, former CEO of GE
- Daniel Yergin, winner of the Pulitzer Prize

It is unclear whether Trump or his transition team have personally met with this advisory group, but media reports indicate that some of the members were considered for cabinet-level positions in his administration (including Dimon as a potential treasury secretary, Cosgrove as potential secretary of veterans affairs, Warsh for a potential Federal Reserve role).

==== Agricultural industry ====
During his campaign, Trump had several dozen agricultural advisors.
