= Birmingham Steel Corporation =

Defunct steel producer in Birmingham, Alabama

Birmingham Steel Corporation was a steel producer in the United States, which made steel merchant and rebar products. The company was formed in 1983 by AEA Investors, Inc. and managed by CEO James Todd. It bought steel mini-mills in Kankakee, Illinois and the mills previously run by Todd at Birmingham Bolt. They then bought the Jackson, Mississippi-based Mississippi Steel Division of Magna Corp. The company went public on NYSE in 1985.

In 1993, the company purchased the American Steel and Wire Company.

In June 2002, after several consecutive quarters of losses, the company filed for Chapter 11 bankruptcy protection. Its remaining steel mills and other assets were purchased by Nucor in December 2002 for approximately $615,000,000.

== See also ==
- Birmingham Steel Magnolias

== Bibliography ==
- Ahlbrandt, Roger S.; Fruehan, Richard J.; Giarratani, Frank (1996). The Renaissance of American Steel: Lessons for Managers in Competitive Industries. New York: Oxford University Press. ISBN 9780195108286.
