= Ferriola =

Ferriola is a surname. Notable people with the surname include:

- John J. Ferriola (born 1952/53), American businessman
- Joseph Ferriola (1927–1989), American mobster

== See also ==
- Ferriols
