= Kenneth Iverson =

Kenneth Iverson may refer to:

- Kenneth E. Iverson (1920–2004), developer of the APL programming language
- F. Kenneth Iverson (1925–2002), former CEO of Nucor
