= Topalian =

Topalian (Armenian: Թոփալյան, Western Armenian Թօփալեան) is an Armenian surname. It may refer to:

- Leon Topalian, American businessman, CEO of Nucor since January 2020
- Mourad Topalian (born 1943), prominent Armenian-American political activist, former chairman of the Armenian National Committee of America (ANCA)
- Stephanie Topalian or just Stephanie (born 1987), Japanese American singer, songwriter and actress of mixed Japanese and Armenian descent. Also part of Genealogy, Armenian entry to Eurovision Song Contest 2015
