= Dan DiMicco =

American businessman (born 1950)

- Born: Daniel Ralph DiMicco; 1950 (age 75–76)
- Education: Brown University (BS); University of Pennsylvania (MS)
- Known for: Former CEO and Chairman, Nucor
- Political party: Republican

Daniel Ralph DiMicco (born 1950) is an American businessman who is the former CEO and chairman of Nucor steel company. He served as a trade advisor to Donald Trump during Trump's 2016 presidential campaign.

== Early life ==
DiMicco was born in 1950, and grew up in Mount Kisco, New York, the eldest of five children of a father who worked in a beer distribution and soda manufacturing business that he started with his brothers.

He graduated from Brown University in 1972 with a bachelor's degree in Engineering, Metallurgy and Materials Science. In 1975, he received a master's degree in Metallurgy and Materials Science from the University of Pennsylvania.

== Career ==
DiMicco joined Nucor in 1982 as plant metallurgist and manager of quality control for Nucor Steel in Plymouth, Utah.

In September 2000, DiMicco, formerly the general manager of the company's highly profitable Nucor-Yamato Steel joint venture, was appointed CEO. In the years that followed, the company made several acquisitions. DiMicco was CEO until December 2012, and chairman from May 2006 until December 2012.

In April 2016, Donald Trump appointed DiMicco as his trade advisor.

DiMicco is chairman of the Coalition for a Prosperous America.

== Charlotte Independence ==
In 2018, DiMicco bought a majority stake in the soccer club Charlotte Independence, that plays in the USL Championship, the second tier of the American soccer pyramid. Following the murder of George Floyd in 2020, DiMicco sent out a series of tweets blaming the subsequent protests on antifa, George Soros and China. DiMicco went on to spread a series of conspiracy theories about COVID-19 and false claims of election fraud. Some supporters of the club responded strongly to these statements, condemning DiMicco, and calling for him to sell his interest in the team. The Independent Supporters Council urged the league to "take action" against him.

On March 29, 2021, the club announced that several owners, including DiMicco, were in the process of selling their ownership stakes.

== Publications ==
American Made: Why Making Things Will Return Us to Greatness (2015)

== Personal life ==
DiMicco lives in Waxhaw, North Carolina. He collects vintage Corvette cars from the 1960s.

In 2012, DiMicco and his wife purchased 75 acres on Lake Wylie, and plan to donate the land to the Catawba Lands Conservancy.
