= Mechanical connections =

Device for connecting rebars

Mechanical rebar connections, also known as mechanical splices or mechanical coupler, are used to join lengths of rebar together to transfer forces from one steel rebar to another.

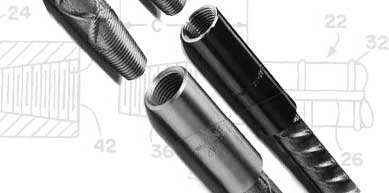
Rebar coupler

Mechanical couplers can be advantageous in comparison with conventional methods of lap splicing because of the requirement for less steel for overlapping. It is more effective in the seismic detailing to avoid reinforcement congestion problems.

The couplers are also used in pre-cast construction.

== Use ==
Any two bars of same or different diameters are joined using the couplers by rotating like nut and bolt.

== Notes ==
- Orsman, Richard (2011). Mechanical Splicing, 08 (Devoran Metals).
