= Rebar spacer =

Component of reinforced concrete construction

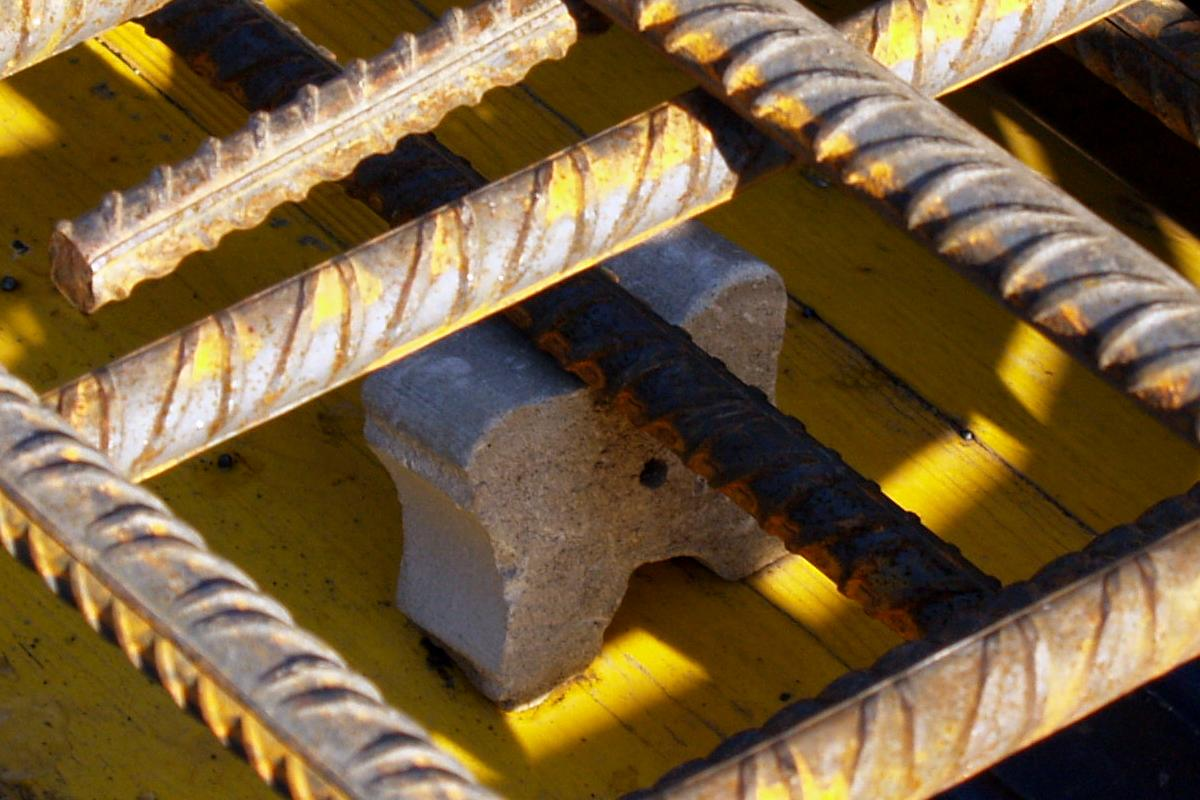
Point rebar spacer

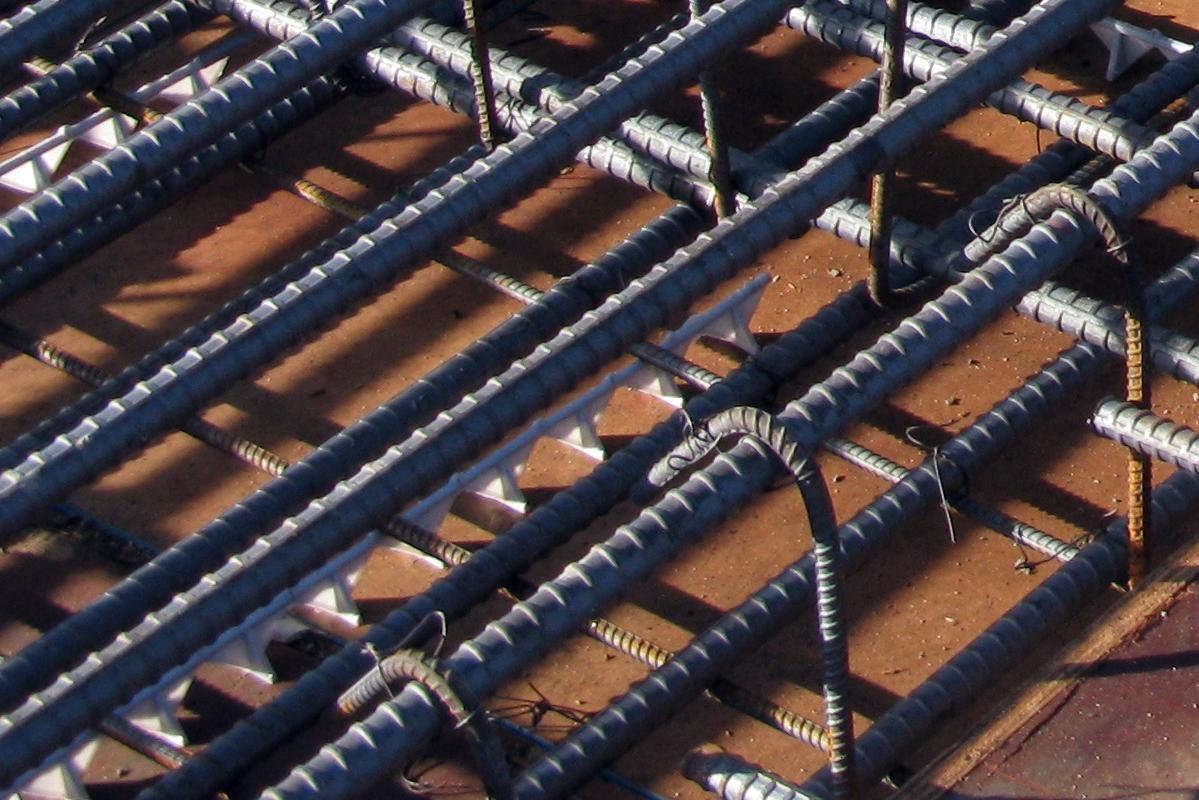
Linear rebar spacer

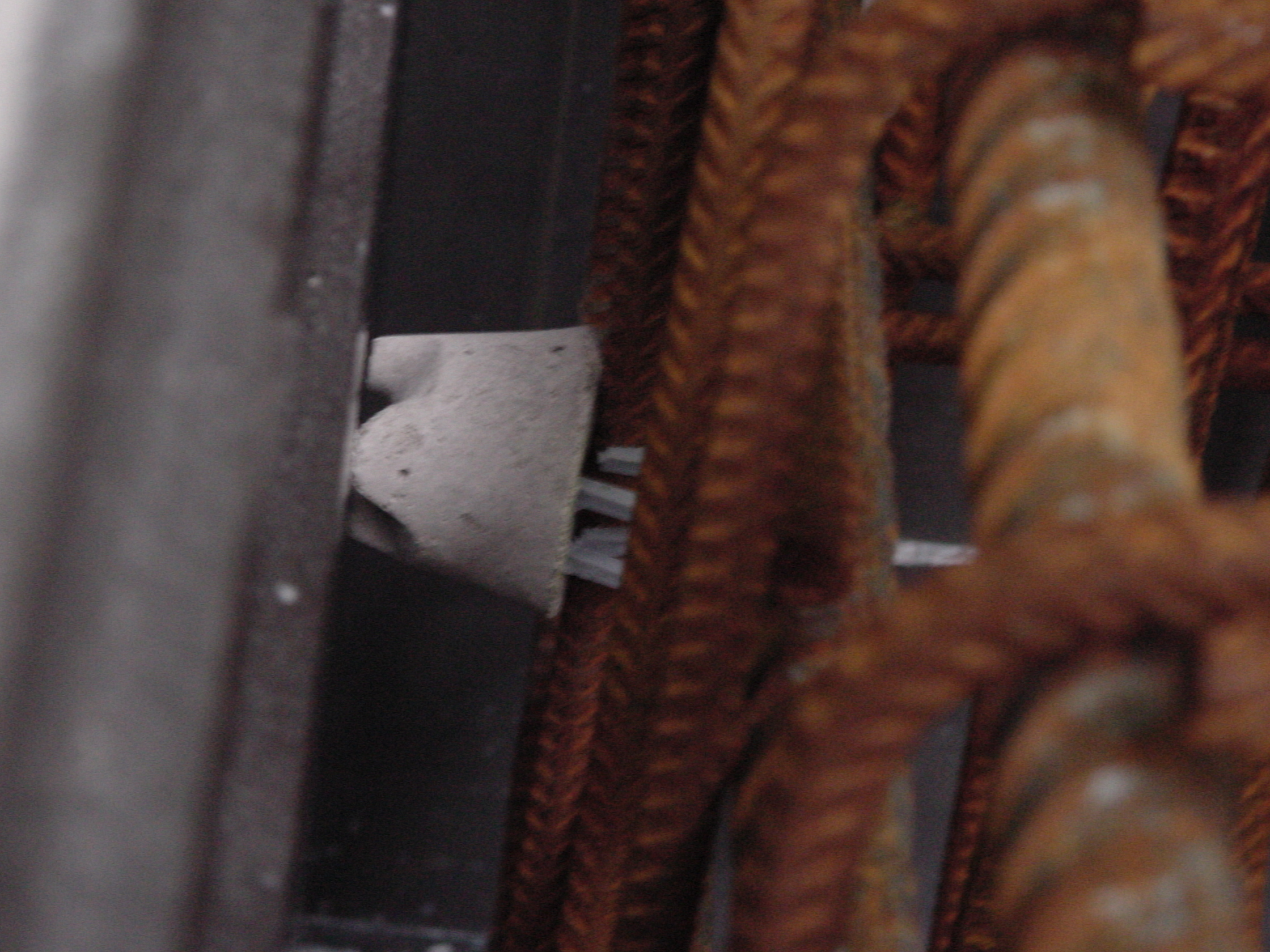
A concrete spacer with a plastic clip in use on the side of the formwork.

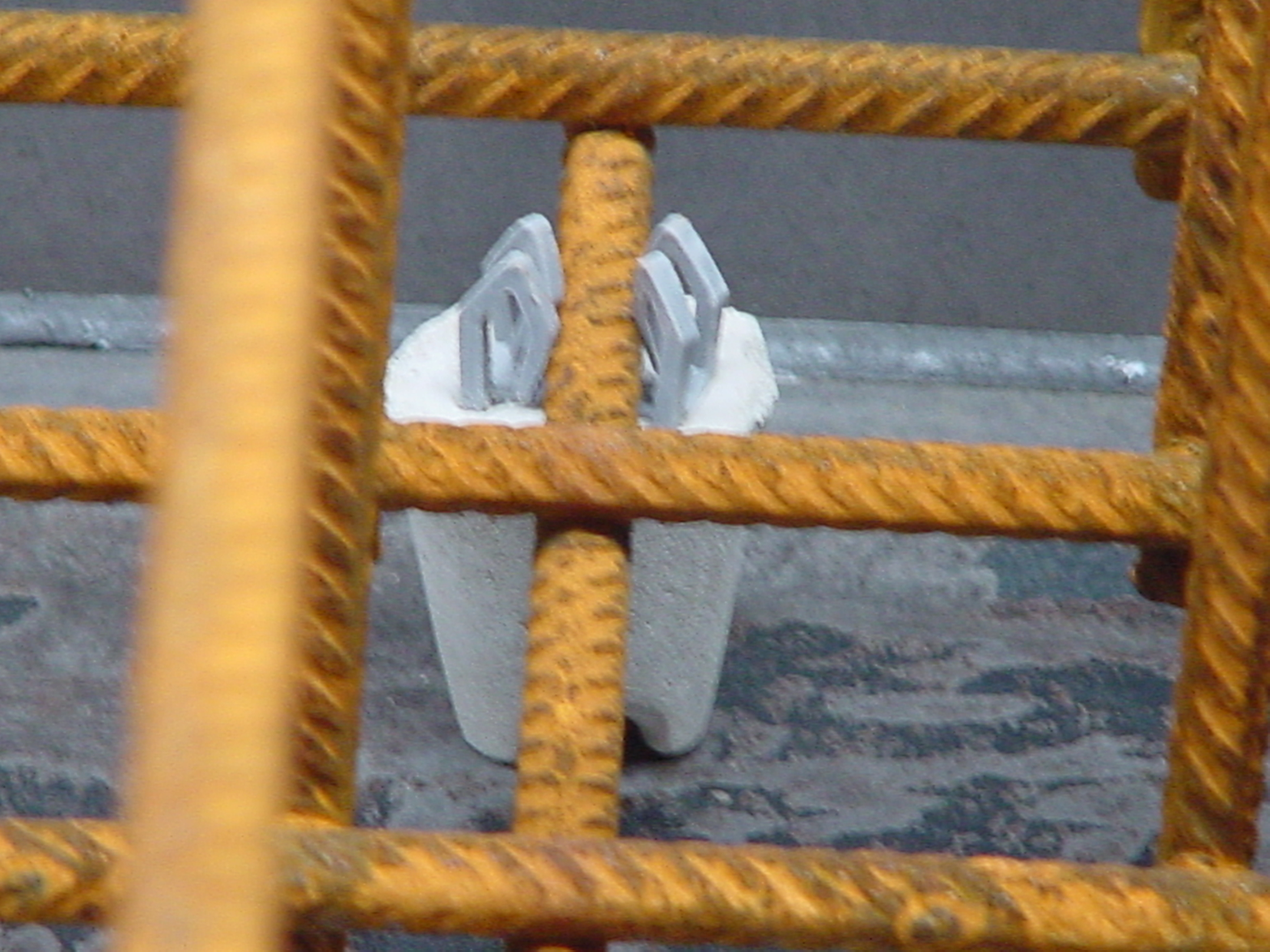
A concrete spacer with a plastic clip in use

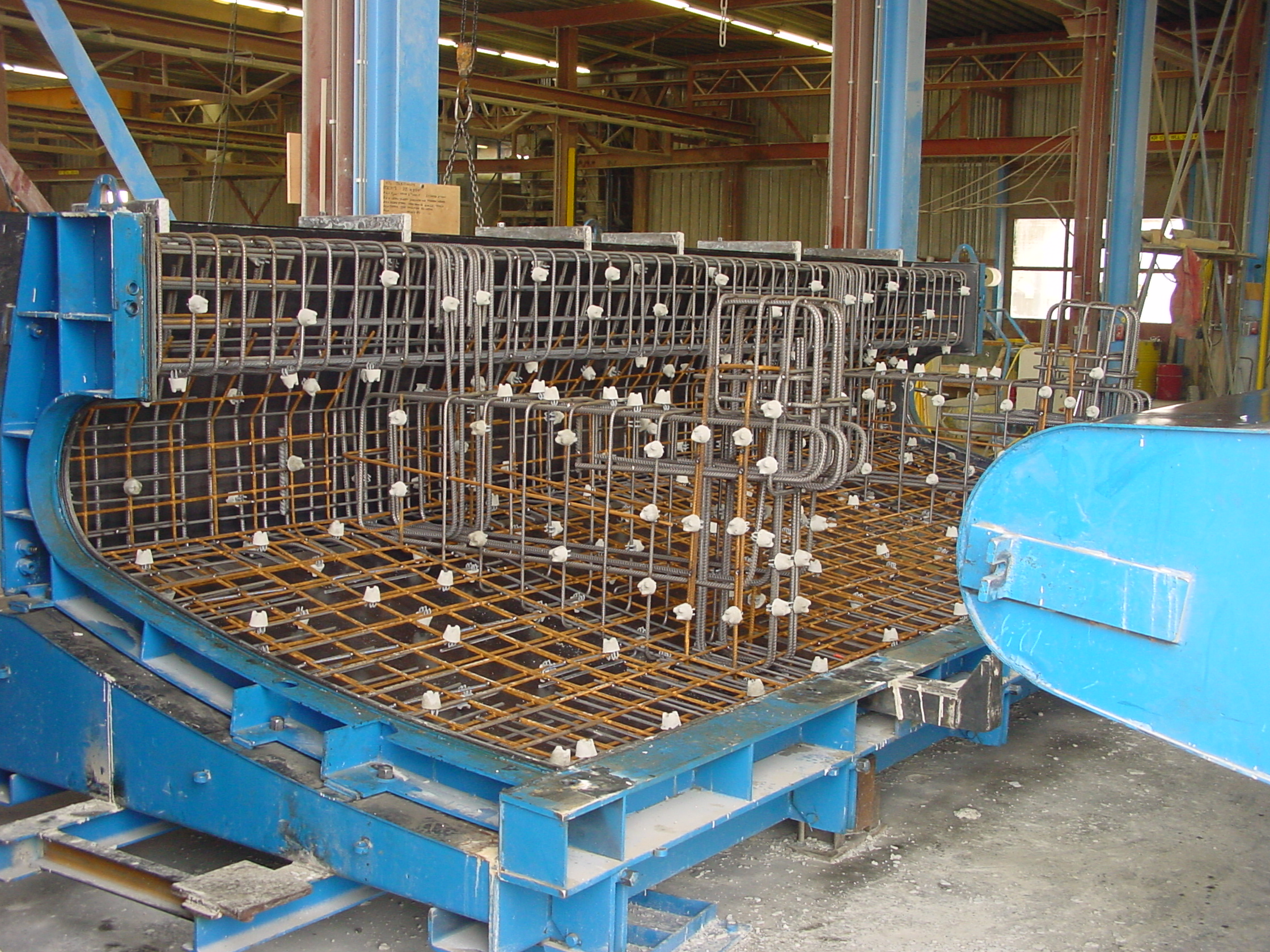
Concrete spacers in a precast element

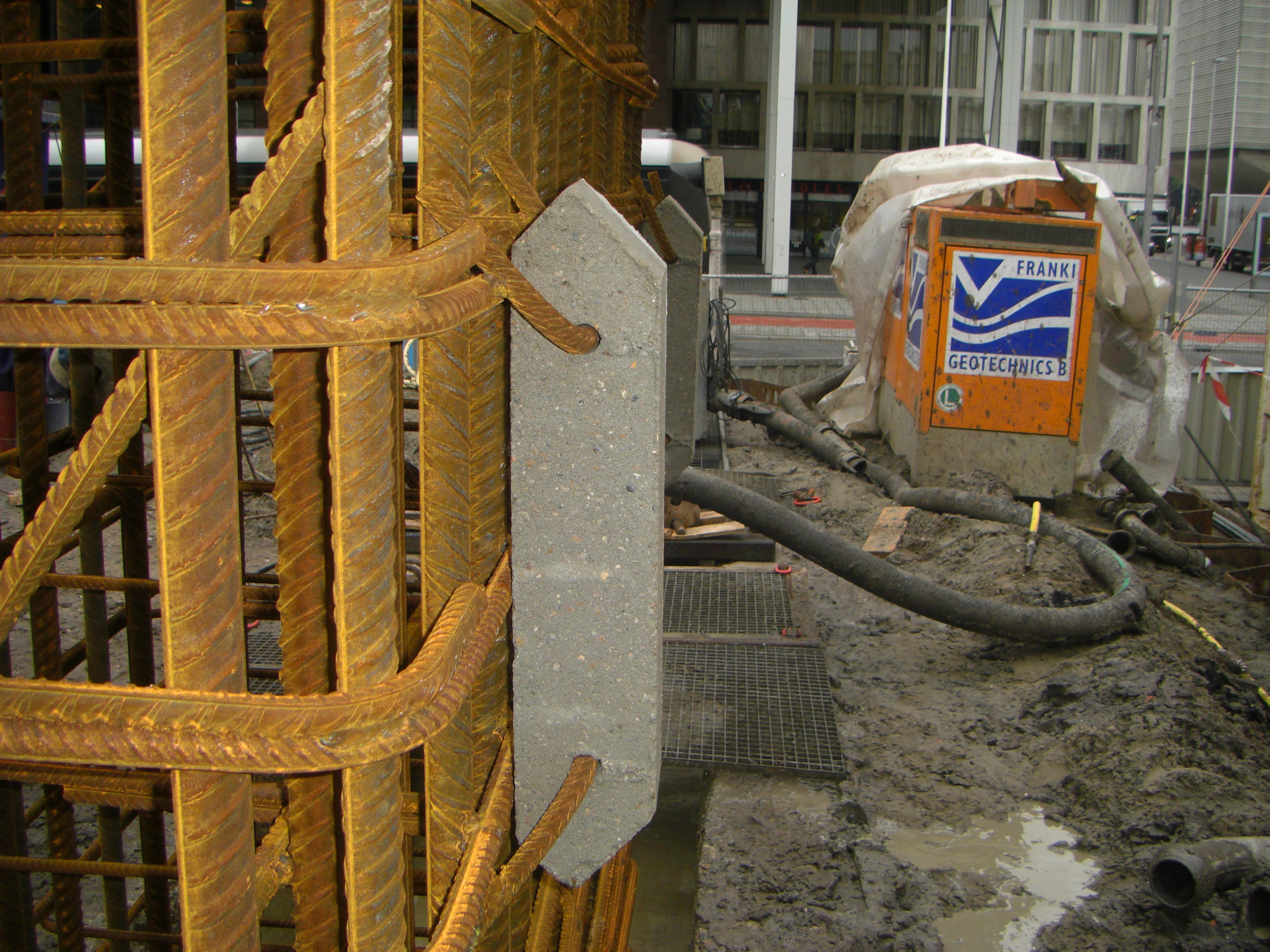
Diaphragm wall block on rebar for a Diaphragm wall

A rebar spacer is a short, rod-like device used to secure reinforcing steel bars, or rebar, within cast assemblies for reinforced concrete structures. The rebar spacers are fixed before the concrete is poured and remain within the structure.

The main categories of rebar spacers are:

- Linear Spacers (Section profiles, H-section profiles, or 3-dimensional shapes),
- Point Spacers (wheel spacers, various tower or chair-like shapes)

Rebar spacers can be divided into three raw materials categories:

1. Concrete spacers
2. Plastic spacers
3. Metal spacers

Each of these categories offer advantages which are specific to certain uses.

Plastic spacers (manufactured from polymers) offer a classic, fast solutions that is easily laid on form-works. The newest solutions focus on non-PVC spacers, which bear an added environmental value.

Concrete spacers (manufactured from fibre reinforced concrete) are used in heavy-weight applications, increased fire safety requirement construction (such as tunnels), and pre-cast concrete systems.

Metal spacers are typically used for keeping distance between more than one layer of rebar reinforcement.

The concrete spacers use the same raw material as the pour, which improves the water tightness and strength of the concrete. Plastic spacers have the advantage of low-cost production and fast processing.

== Function ==
The engineering study of every reinforced concrete construction, whether it is a building, a bridge, a bearing wall, or another structure, dictates the positioning of steel rebars at specific positions in the volume of concrete (predicted concrete cover of steel reinforcement bars). This cover varies between 10 mm and 100 mm.

The statics of every concrete construction is designed in such a way that steel and concrete properties are combined in order to achieve the most possible strength for the particular construction (e.g. anti-earthquake protection) as well as to prevent the long-term corrosion of steel that would weaken the construction.

The function of rebar spacers is to maintain the precise positioning of steel reinforcement, facilitating the implementation of theoretical design specifications in concrete construction. This includes ensuring the appropriate steel cover for specific structural elements (such as in a concrete slab or a beam) should be generally uniform within the element.

The use of spacers is particularly important in areas with high earthquake activity in combination with corrosive environments (like proximity to the salt water of the sea), for example Japan, Iran, Greece, California, etc.

== Plastic versus concrete spacers and bar supports ==
=== Plastic spacers and bar supports ===
Plastic spacers and bar supports do not bond well with concrete and are not compatible materials. Plastic has mechanical properties (holds the bar in position) but no structural properties, and is a foreign element within the construction.

When the concrete is poured into the form, a small gap is created between the concrete and the plastic. Plastic has a coefficient of thermal expansion and contraction 10 to 15 times that of concrete. When subjected to temperature variations, the plastic continues to expand and contract at the higher coefficient.

At elevated temperatures, plastic may melt. Consequently, this leads to a disconnection between the spacers and the concrete that has been cast. Such separation establishes an unobstructed pathway for corrosive substances to access the steel reinforcement from the concrete product's exterior. This process initiates the corrosion of the steel, which ultimately extends to the concrete.

If steam curing is applied to the concrete, the heat in the curing process causes the plastic to expand while the concrete is relatively fresh and weak. After reaching the maximum curing temperature and volume expansion of the plastic, the temperature is held at this level until the concrete reaches the desired strength. After curing, the subsequent lower temperatures cause the plastic to contract, and a gap remains at the interface between the plastic and concrete.

Plastic spacers are also subject to corrosion when they come into contact with chlorides and chemicals, whereas concrete has a much higher resistance.

=== Concrete spacers and bar supports ===
Concrete spacers and bar supports are often made of the same material properties as the poured concrete, so thermal expansion and contraction are equal. As a result, the concrete and spacers will bond without gaps. Often these spacers are manufactured from extruded fiber-reinforced concrete which improves crack resistance.

Concrete spacers and bar support help maintain material integrity and uniformity of the concrete, and provide a cover over the reinforcement that protects against corrosion.

=== Concrete spacers with a plastic clip or other fixing mechanism ===
Concrete spacers and bar supports help maintain material integrity and uniformity of the concrete. They provide a cover over the reinforcement that protects against corrosion.

Concrete spacers with a plastic clip or fixing mechanism do not have a negative effect on material integrity and do not weaken the corrosion protective cover over the reinforcement.

The plastic clip or fixing mechanism is hinged from the top of the spacer and does not come into contact with the soffit of the concrete. The plastic clip or fastening mechanism is incorporated at a depth of merely 5 mm into the spacer, thereby preserving the material's integrity at the surface of the product.

This plastic component in the clip or fastening mechanism serves exclusively for attachment and securing of the reinforcement, allowing the concrete segment to fulfil the spacer's functional role.
