= Stephen Calk =

American banking executive

- Born: 1964 or 1965 (age 61–62); Pontiac, Michigan, U.S.
- Education: University of Illinois, Urbana-Champaign (BA); Northwestern University (MBA); Harvard Business School (PPL)
- Known for: Entrepreneur
- Political party: Republican
- Children: 3

Stephen M. Calk (born 1964/1965) is the founder, former Chairman and CEO of The Federal Savings Bank, a federally chartered National Bank headquartered in Chicago, Illinois. He was an economic advisor to Donald Trump during the 2016 United States presidential election campaign.

Calk was convicted of conspiracy and bribery in July 2021 for providing loans to Paul Manafort, the former chairman of the 2016 Donald Trump presidential campaign, in exchange for a possible high-ranking position in the Trump administration. He was sentenced to one year in prison in February 2022.

== Early life and career ==
Calk was born in Detroit, Michigan, and was raised in Florida, Illinois, and London. He attended the United States Military Academy Preparatory School, and is a 1988 graduate of the University of Illinois at Urbana–Champaign.

In 1982, he enlisted in the United States Army and was honorably discharged as a private first class before he was early commissioned as an army officer. He is a graduate of the United States Army Aviation School and served in both active and reserve status as a combat helicopter pilot and commander for over 16 years.

In 1998, Calk received a Master of Business Administration degree from the Kellogg School of Management at Northwestern University. Calk is also a graduate of the nine-year Presidents Program in Leadership at Harvard Business School.

He served as chairman of the United States 10th Congressional District's Service Academy Selection Committee and as a certified leader in the Boy Scouts of America. He served as a trustee for the University of Illinois St. John's Catholic Newman Center and on the board of the USO of Illinois. From 2002, he was a member of the Chicago chapter of the World Presidents Organization and Young Presidents Organization. Calk was a trainer and mentor of junior military officers and senior non-commissioned officers before taking command positions or returning to civilian life after service to their country. He serves as an ambassador for the Special Operations Warrior Foundation.

Calk's banking career began in 1995 when he founded Chicago Bancorp. He and his brother John were co-owners. In 2011, through a holding company, Calk and his brother John bought a small Kansas bank and renamed it the Federal Savings Bank, and by February 2012, the Federal Savings Bank was headquartered at the same address and in the same suite as Chicago Bancorp. In the spring of 2012, Calk struck a deal with Chicago mayor Rahm Emanuel. Calk promised that his Federal Savings Bank "will endeavor to hire as many qualified Chicago residents as possible" in exchange for receiving taxpayer-funded grants from the city of $10,000 per employee, to be used for job training. Between 2012 and 2015, Calk's Federal Savings Bank received $3.6 million in taxpayer-funded grants. In a June 2012 press conference with Emanuel, Calk described the Federal Savings Bank as relocating to Chicago as a result of Emanuel's efforts. However, according to expert testimony in a subsequent trial, 197 of the Federal Savings Bank's new hires had previously worked at Calk's Chicago Bancorp, which only had 223 employees at the start of 2012 and was formally dissolved in early 2013. The magazine American Banker described the Calk brothers as pulling off "a neat trick": "Their bank, among the most profitable in the country that year, collected $3.6 million in public subsidies in substantial part by rehiring employees who they had recently fired from a separate company that they also owned."

Calk, Chicago Bancorp, and the Federal Savings Bank of Chicago were sued in 2012 and again in 2014 by CitiMortgage for alleged inaccuracies and misrepresentations in loans that Calk's enterprises had originated and later sold to CitiMortgage.

In 2014, the Federal Savings Bank signed an agreement to cooperate with the New York City real estate firm Douglas Elliman, and in exchange, either Douglas Elliman or its parent company, the Vector Group, invested $2 million in Calk's bank, according to a 2015 deposition by Howard Lorber, the Vector Group's CEO. The collaboration foundered, however, and was terminated in 2014. In the 2015 deposition, Lorber called Calk difficult to work with and called Calk's account of their collaboration "completely delusional." Lorber, a longtime friend and ally of Trump's, later served with Calk on the Trump campaign's economic council.

Calk was named to the Trump campaign's economic advisory panel in August 2016.

In 2019, Calk resigned as chairman and CEO from the Federal Savings Bank of Chicago.

== Loans to Paul Manafort ==
Manafort first got in touch with Calk's Federal Savings Bank of Chicago in April 2016, according to testimony given by the bank's senior vice president Dennis Raico at Manafort's August 2018 trial for fraud and tax evasion. Manafort, Calk, and Raico discussed loans and politics over dinner in New York in May 2016. On July 28, Calk became directly involved in discussions about loans to Manafort and his son-in-law for investment properties, which Raico told the court was unusual. Subsequently, over a lunch, Calk and Manafort discussed another loan. On October 6, 2016, Manafort emailed Calk to say that he had been mistaken in saying at this lunch that he owed $2.5 million on a Bridgehampton, New York, property that he intended to use as collateral. In fact he owed $3 million. "I must have had a blackout," Manafort wrote in his email. On October 16, Manafort asked to change the terms of the loan, requesting a line of credit on the property instead of using it as collateral for a construction loan for a California property. In his application materials for the loan, Manafort provided a 2016 income statement for himself that his business partner Rick Gates later testified was false.

James Brennan, another vice president at the bank, testified at Manafort's trial that Manafort failed to declare in his application materials that two of his New York properties were already mortgaged and that Manafort's statements about his income in 2015 were inconsistent. Brennan also testified that bank employees had noticed that Manafort seemed to have no income as of July 2016, though he claimed to be owed $2.4 million, and that he was more than 90 days late on a $300,000 credit card bill. Concerns within the bank about the propriety of the loan were overruled by Calk, however, and on November 16, 2016, Manafort received from Calk's bank a $9.5 million cash-out refinance loan on a house in Bridgehampton, New York. "It closed because Mr. Calk wanted it to close," Brennan testified. On January 4, 2017, Manafort received an additional loan from Calk's bank, a $6.5 million construction loan on a property on Union Street in New York City. The two loans, totalling about $16 million, were the largest and second-largest ever issued by the bank. The combined size of the loans at the time represented around 5 percent of the bank's asset base of $341 million, and represented about 22 percent of the bank's equity capital of $72 million.

The bank has since written the loans off as a loss.

== Investigation, indictment, and trial ==
At a 2018 bail hearing and in a superseding indictment filed against Trump's former campaign manager, Paul Manafort, the office of U.S. Special Counsel Robert Mueller alleged that Manafort had fraudulently applied for around $16 million in loans from "Lender D," reported by multiple sources at the time as the Federal Savings Bank of Chicago, before and shortly after the 2016 presidential election. In court filings Mueller alleged that Manafort had doctored financial statements from his lobbying firm, "overstating its income by millions of dollars," and had committed a "series of bank loans and bank loan conspiracies." In February 2018 the Wall Street Journal and other media outlets reported that Mueller's office was investigating whether there had been a quid pro quo arrangement in which Calk approved the loans in return for a position in the Trump administration as Secretary of the Army.

Calk had been named to the Trump campaign's economic advisory panel in August 2016, at Manafort's suggestion, several months after they had begun discussing a possible loan for Manafort. During Manafort's August 2018 trial, prosecutors introduced as evidence emails from Calk showing that on August 4, 2016, he wrote Manafort that "I am happy and willing to serve," and that in November, just after Trump's election, he sent Manafort a resume and a request to be nominated Secretary of the Army, adding that he would also be willing to serve as chief of the departments of Treasury, Commerce, Housing or Urban Development, and Defense, or as ambassador to the United Kingdom, France, Germany, Italy, Spain, Japan, Ireland, Australia, China, United Nations, the European Union, Portugal, the Vatican, Luxembourg, Austria, Switzerland, the Netherlands, or Singapore. After Trump's election, Calk instructed Dennis Raico, a senior vice president for Calk's bank, to ask Manafort whether Calk might be named Secretary of the Treasury or Secretary of Housing and Urban Development, according to testimony at Manafort's trial by Raico, although Raico also testified that, embarrassed by the request, he never did ask. During the presidential transition, Manafort wrote in an email to his former deputy Rick Gates, then serving on the inauguration committee, that "we need to discuss Steve Calk for Secretary of Army." On November 30, 2016, Manafort sent an email to Jared Kushner recommending Calk be named Secretary of the Army, to which Kushner replied, "On it!" Shortly before Christmas 2016, Manafort added Calk and Calk's son to a list of people to be invited to Trump's inauguration.

Calk did not become a finalist for any government positions in the Trump administration.

In May 2019, Calk was indicted in Manhattan's Federal District Court on one count of financial institution bribery, for having pushed the Federal Savings Bank to grant $16 million of loans to Manafort in hopes of winning a government position. The trial was delayed during the coronavirus pandemic, as prosecutors found it difficult to persuade witnesses to travel from Illinois to New York City. In July 2021, a jury unanimously found Calk guilty of financial institution bribery and conspiracy to commit financial institution bribery. In February 2022, Calk was sentenced to one year and one day in prison and ordered to pay more than $1 million in fines.

== See also ==
- List of economic advisors to Donald Trump in 2016 presidential campaign
