= Rebar =

Steel reinforcement

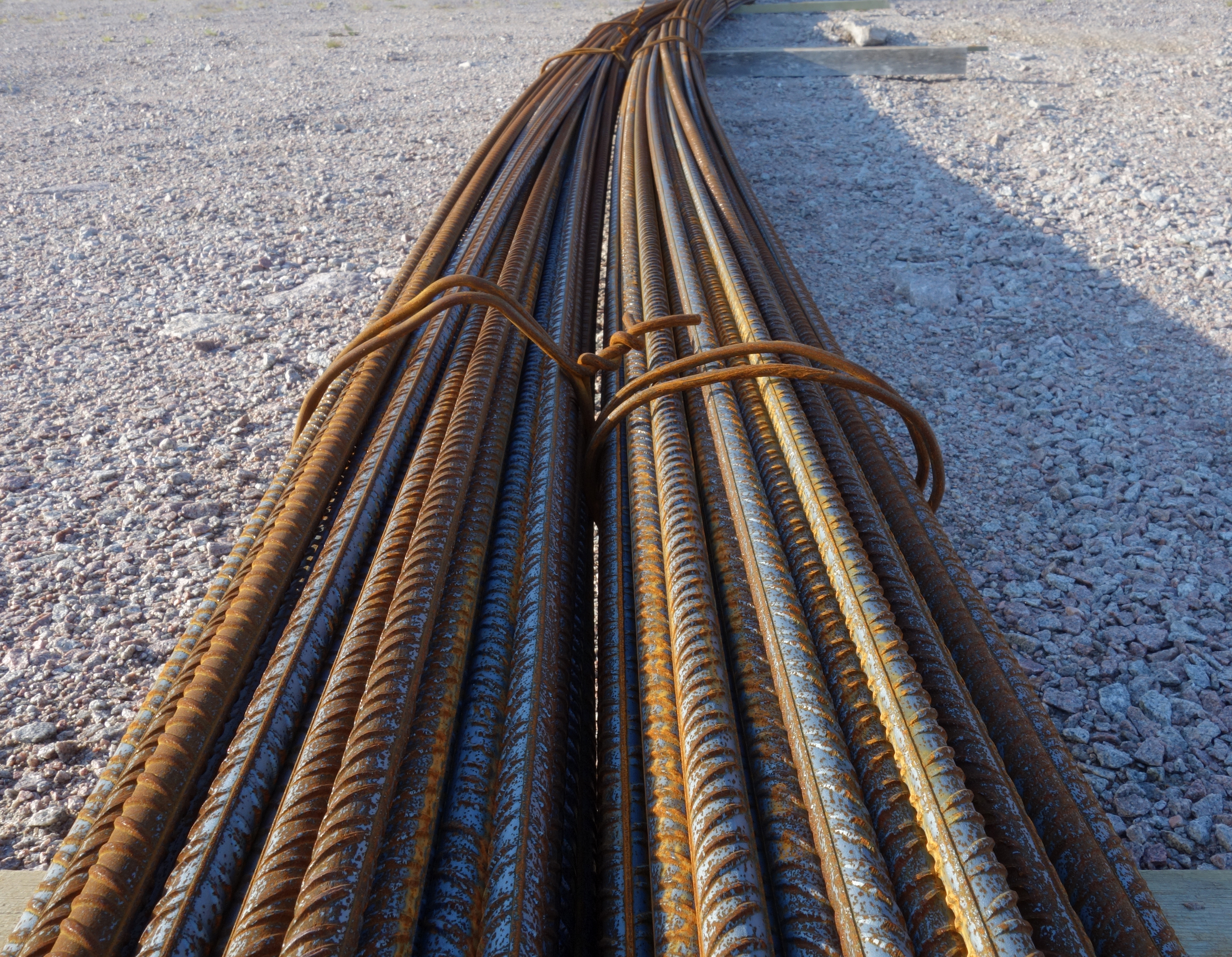
Two bundles of full-length rebar, which will be placed, bent, or cut as required by installation

Rebar (short for reinforcement bar or reinforcing bar), known when massed as reinforcing steel or steel reinforcement, is a tension device added to concrete to form reinforced concrete and reinforced masonry structures to strengthen and aid the concrete under tension. Concrete is strong under compression, but has low tensile strength. Rebar usually consists of steel bars which significantly increase the tensile strength of the structure. Rebar surfaces feature a continuous series of ribs, lugs or indentations to promote a better bond with the concrete and reduce the risk of slippage.

The most common type of rebar is carbon steel, typically consisting of hot-rolled round bars with deformation patterns embossed into its surface. Steel and concrete have similar coefficients of thermal expansion, so a concrete structural member reinforced with steel will experience minimal differential stress as the temperature changes.

Other readily available types of rebar are manufactured of stainless steel, and composite bars made of glass fiber, carbon fiber, or basalt fiber. The carbon steel reinforcing bars may also be coated in zinc or an epoxy resin designed to resist the effects of corrosion, especially when used in saltwater environments. Bamboo has been shown to be a viable alternative to reinforcing steel in concrete construction. These alternative types tend to be more expensive or may have lesser mechanical properties and are thus more often used in specialty construction where their physical characteristics fulfill a specific performance requirement that carbon steel does not provide.

== History ==
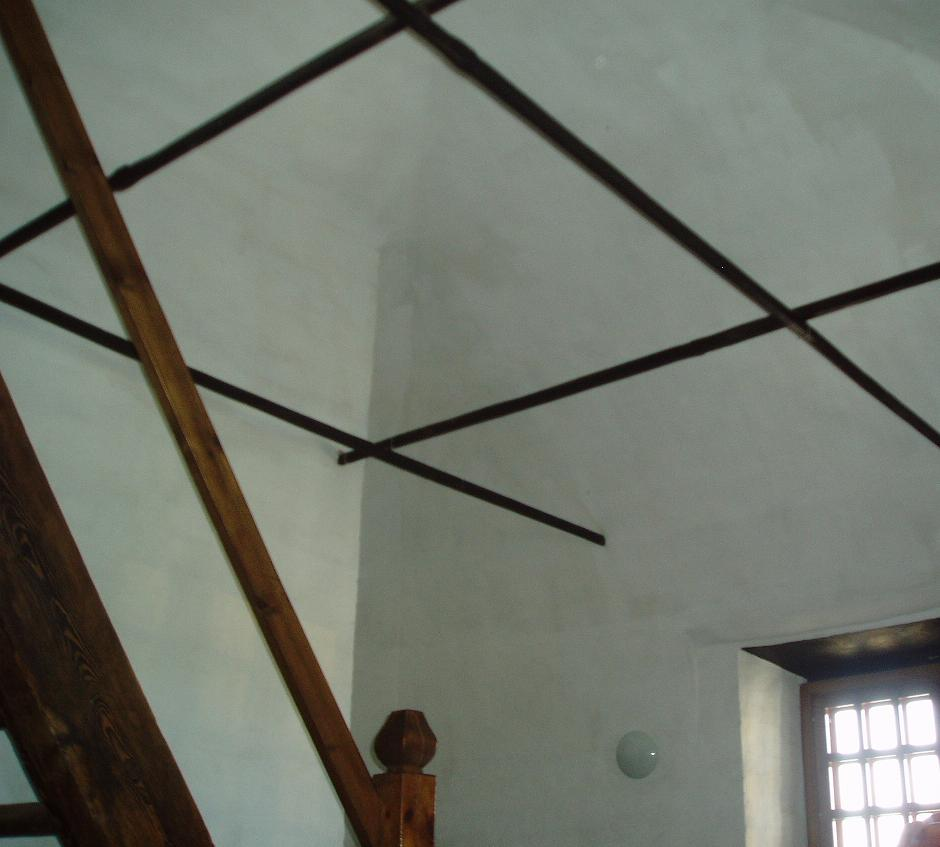
An early version of rebar inside the Leaning Tower of Nevyansk

Reinforcing bars in masonry construction have been used since antiquity, with Rome using iron or wooden rods in arch construction. Iron tie rods and anchor plates were later employed across Medieval Europe, as a device to reinforce arches, vaults, and cupolas. 2,500 meters of rebar was used in the 14th-century Château de Vincennes.

During the 18th century, rebar was used to form the carcass of the Leaning Tower of Nevyansk in Russia, built on the orders of the industrialist Akinfiy Demidov. The wrought iron used for the rebar was of high quality, and there is no corrosion on the bars to this day. The carcass of the tower was connected to its cast iron tented roof, crowned with one of the first known lightning rods.

However, not until the mid-19th century, with the embedding of steel bars into concrete (thus producing modern reinforced concrete), did rebar display its greatest strengths. Several people in Europe and North America developed reinforced concrete in the 1850s. These include Joseph-Louis Lambot of France, who built reinforced concrete boats in Paris (1854) and Thaddeus Hyatt of the United States, who produced and tested reinforced concrete beams. Joseph Monier of France is one of the most notable figures for the invention and popularization of reinforced concrete. As a French gardener, Monier patented reinforced concrete flowerpots in 1867, before proceeding to build reinforced concrete water tanks and bridges.

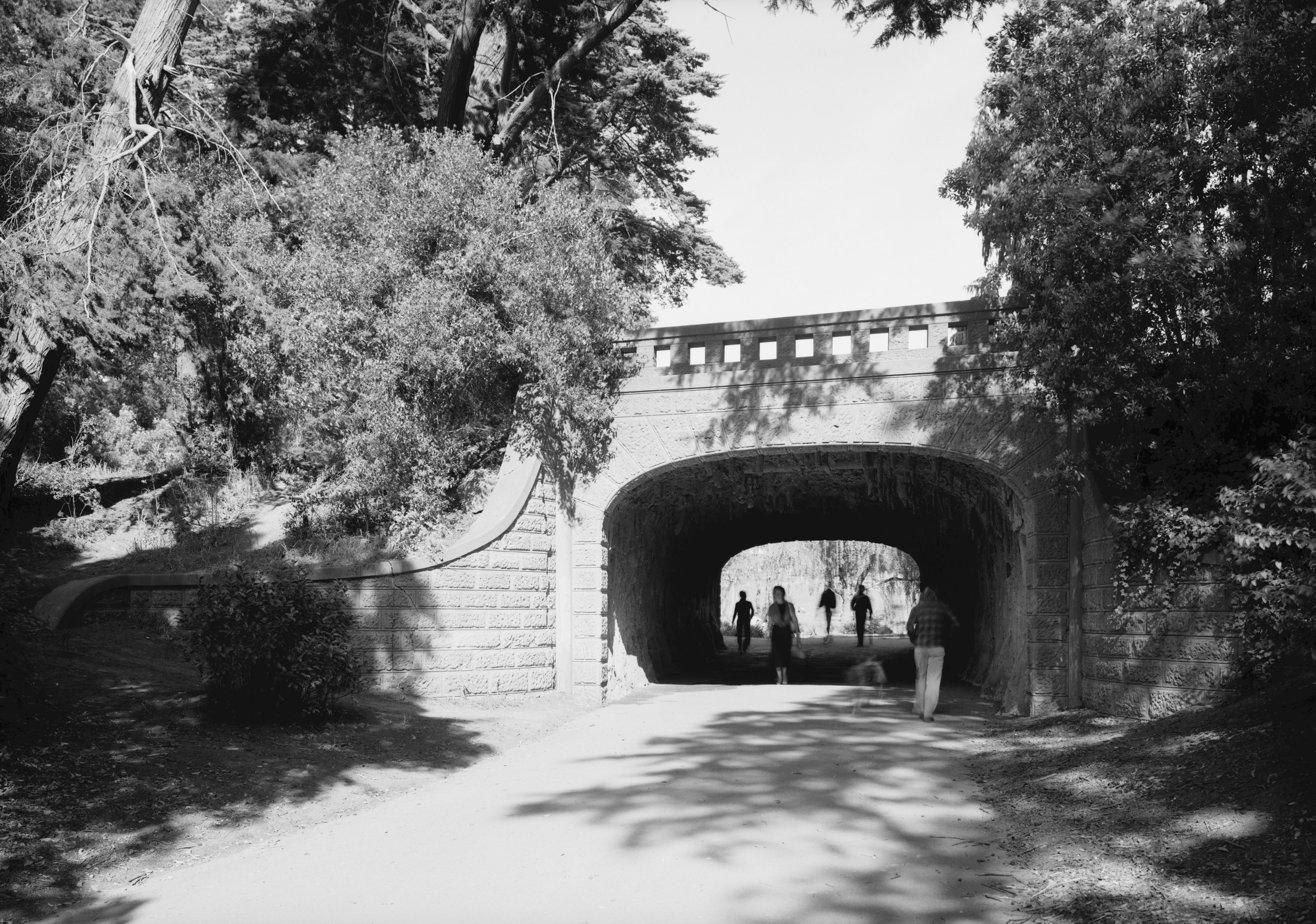
The Alvord Lake Bridge in San Francisco's Golden Gate Park, the first reinforced concrete bridge built in the United States

Ernest L. Ransome, an English engineer and architect who worked in the United States, made a significant contribution to the development of reinforcing bars in concrete construction. He invented twisted iron rebar, which he initially thought of while designing self-supporting sidewalks for the Masonic Hall in Stockton, California. His twisted rebar was, however, not initially appreciated and even ridiculed at the Technical Society of California, where members stated that the twisting would weaken the iron. In 1889, Ransome worked on the West Coast mainly designing bridges. One of these, the Alvord Lake Bridge in San Francisco's Golden Gate Park, was the first reinforced concrete bridge built in the United States. He used twisted rebar in this structure.

At the same time Ransome was inventing twisted steel rebar, C.A.P. Turner was designing his "mushroom system" of reinforced concrete floor slabs with smooth round rods and Julius Kahn was experimenting with an innovative rolled diamond-shaped rebar with flat-plate flanges angled upwards at 45° (patented in 1902). Kahn predicted concrete beams with this reinforcing system would bend like a Warren truss, and also thought of this rebar as shear reinforcement. Kahn's reinforcing system was built in concrete beams, joists, and columns.

The system was both praised and criticized by Kahn's engineering contemporaries: Turner voiced strong objections to this system as it could cause catastrophic failure to concrete structures. He rejected the idea that Kahn's reinforcing system in concrete beams would act as a Warren truss and also noted that this system would not provide the adequate amount of shear stress reinforcement at the ends of the simply supported beams, the place where the shear stress is greatest. Furthermore, Turner warned that Kahn's system could result in a brittle failure as it did not have longitudinal reinforcement in the beams at the columns.

This type of failure manifested in the partial collapse of the Bixby Hotel in Long Beach, California and total collapse of the Eastman Kodak Building in Rochester, New York, both during construction in 1906. It was, however, concluded that both failures were the consequences of poor-quality labor. With the increase in demand of construction standardization, innovative reinforcing systems such as Kahn's were pushed to the side in favor of the concrete reinforcing systems seen today.

Requirements for deformations on steel bar reinforcement were not standardized in US construction until about 1950. Modern requirements for deformations were established in "Tentative Specifications for the Deformations of Deformed Steel Bars for Concrete Reinforcement", ASTM A305-47T. Subsequently, changes were made that increased rib height and reduced rib spacing for certain bar sizes, and the qualification of “tentative” was removed when the updated standard ASTM A305-49 was issued in 1949. The requirements for deformations found in current specifications for steel bar reinforcing, such as ASTM A615 and ASTM A706, among others, are the same as those specified in ASTM A305-49.

== Use in concrete and masonry ==
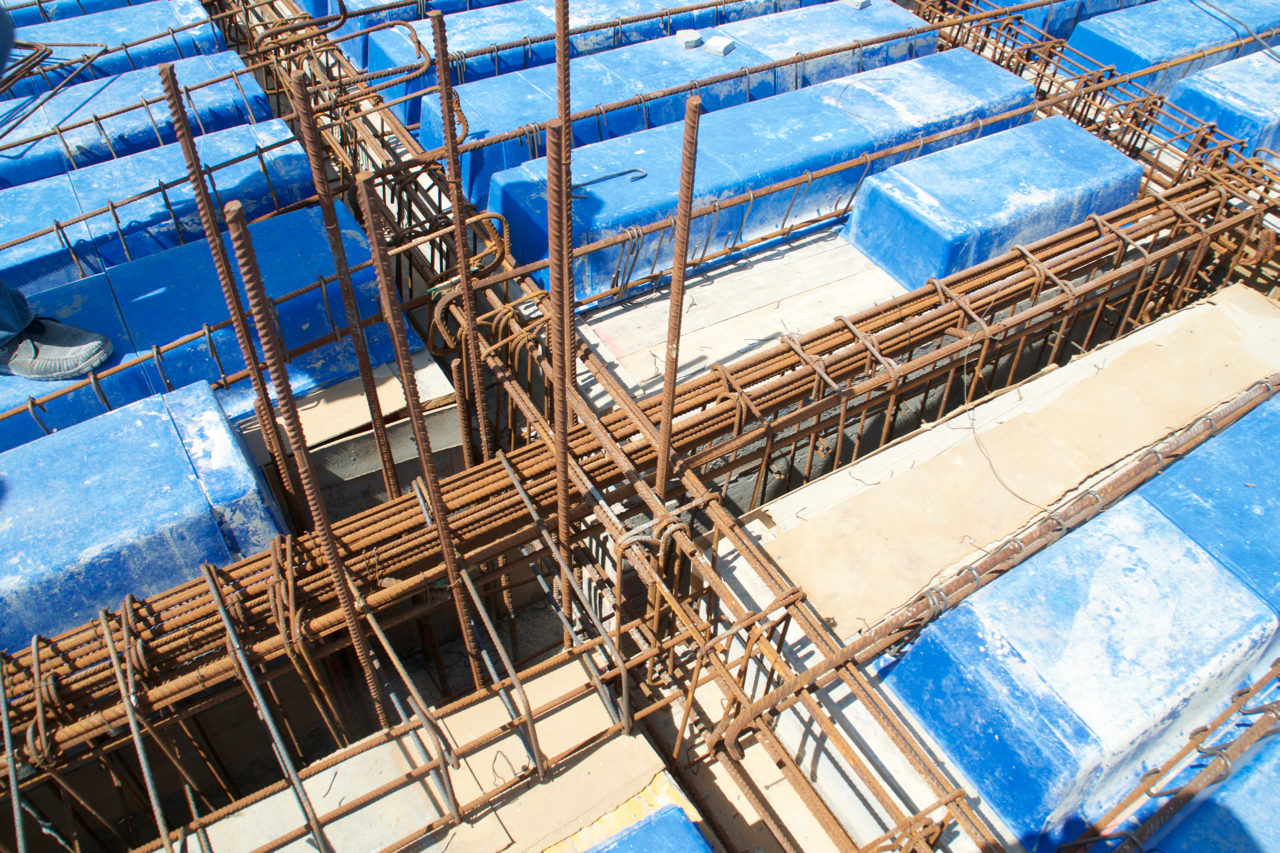
Rebar has been placed atop a temporary wooden formwork deck prior to pouring concrete. The large horizontal rebar "cages" will be encased within a beam, while several thick vertical rebar stubs will stick out of the pour to form the base of a future column.

Concrete is a material that is very strong in compression, but relatively weak in tension. To compensate for this imbalance in concrete's behavior, rebar is cast into it to carry the tensile loads. Most steel reinforcement is divided into primary and secondary reinforcement:

- Primary reinforcement refers to the steel which is employed to guarantee the resistance needed by the structure as a whole to support the design loads.
- Secondary reinforcement, also known as distribution or thermal reinforcement, is employed for durability and aesthetic reasons, by providing enough localized resistance to limit cracking and resist stresses caused by effects such as temperature changes and shrinkage.

Secondary applications include rebar embedded in masonry walls, which includes both bars placed horizontally in a mortar joint (every fourth or fifth course of block) or vertically (in the horizontal voids of cement blocks and cored bricks, which is then fixed in place with grout. Masonry structures held together with grout have similar properties to concrete – high compressive resistance but a limited ability to carry tensile loads. When rebar is added they are known as "reinforced masonry".

A similar approach (of embedding rebar vertically in designed voids in engineered blocks) is also used in dry-plated landscape walls, at least pinning the lowest course in place into the earth, also employed securing the lowest course and/or deadmen in walls made of engineered concrete or wooden landscape ties.

In unusual cases, steel reinforcement may be embedded and partially exposed, as in the steel tie bars that constrain and reinforce the masonry of Nevyansk Tower or ancient structures in Rome and the Vatican.

== Physical characteristics ==
Steel has a thermal expansion coefficient nearly equal to that of modern concrete. If this were not so, it would cause problems through additional longitudinal and perpendicular stresses at temperatures different from the temperature of the setting. Although rebar has ribs that bind it mechanically to the concrete, it can still be pulled out of the concrete under high stresses, an occurrence that often accompanies a larger-scale collapse of the structure. To prevent such a failure, rebar is either deeply embedded into adjacent structural members (40–60 times the diameter), or bent and hooked at the ends to lock it around the concrete and other rebar. This first approach increases the friction locking the bar into place, while the second makes use of the high compressive strength of concrete.

Common rebar is made of unfinished tempered steel, making it susceptible to rusting. Normally the concrete cover is able to provide a pH value higher than 12 avoiding the corrosion reaction. Too little concrete cover can compromise this guard through carbonation from the surface, and salt penetration. Too much concrete cover can cause bigger crack widths which also compromises the local guard. As rust takes up greater volume than the steel from which it was formed, it causes severe internal pressure on the surrounding concrete, leading to cracking, spalling, and, ultimately, structural failure. This phenomenon is known as oxide jacking.

This is a particular problem where the concrete is exposed to salt water, as in bridges where salt is applied to roadways in winter, or in marine applications. Uncoated, corrosion-resistant low-carbon/chromium (microcomposite), silicon bronze, epoxy-coated, galvanized, or stainless steel rebars may be employed in these situations at greater initial expense, but significantly lower expense over the service life of the project.

Extra care is taken during the transport, fabrication, handling, installation, and concrete placement process when working with epoxy-coated rebar, because damage will reduce the long-term corrosion resistance of these bars. Even damaged epoxy-coated bars have shown better performance than uncoated reinforcing bars, though issues from debonding of the epoxy coating from the bars and corrosion under the epoxy film have been reported. These epoxy-coated bars are used in over 70,000 bridge decks in the US, but this technology was slowly being phased out in favor of stainless steel rebar as of 2005 because of its poor performance.

Requirements for deformations are found in US-standard product specifications for steel bar reinforcing, such as ASTM A615 and ASTM A706, and dictate lug spacing and height.

Fibre-reinforced plastic rebar is also used in high-corrosion environments. It is available in many forms, such as spirals for reinforcing columns, common rods, and meshes. Most commercially available rebar is made from unidirectional fibers set in a thermoset polymer resin and is often referred to as FRP.

Some special construction such as research and manufacturing facilities with very sensitive electronics may require the use of reinforcement that is non-conductive to electricity, and medical imaging equipment rooms may require non-magnetic properties to avoid interference. FRP rebar, notably glass fibre types have low electrical conductivity and are non-magnetic which is commonly used for such needs. Stainless steel rebar with low magnetic permeability is available and is sometimes used to avoid magnetic interference issues.

Reinforcing steel can also be displaced by impacts such as earthquakes, resulting in structural failure. The prime example of this is the collapse of the Cypress Street Viaduct in Oakland, California as a result of the 1989 Loma Prieta earthquake, causing 42 fatalities. The shaking of the earthquake caused rebars to burst from the concrete and buckle. Updated building designs, including more circumferential rebar, can address this type of failure.

== Sizes and grades ==
=== US sizes ===
US/Imperial bar sizes give the diameter in units of 1/8 inch (3.2 mm) for bar sizes #2 through #8, so that #8 = 8/8 inch = 1-inch (25 mm) diameter.

There are no fractional bar sizes in this system. The "#" symbol indicates the number sign, and thus "#6" is read as "number six". The use of the "#" sign is customary for US sizes, but "No." is sometimes used instead. Within the trades, rebar is known by a shorthand utilizing the bar diameter as descriptor, such as "four-bar" for bar that is four-eighths (or one-half) of an inch.

The cross-sectional area of a bar, as given by πr², works out to (bar size/9.027)², which is approximated as (bar size/9)² square inches. For example, the area of #8 bar is (8/9)² = 0.79 square inches.

Bar sizes larger than #8 follow the 1/8-inch rule imperfectly and skip sizes #12–13, and #15–17 due to historical convention. In early concrete construction bars of one inch and larger were available only in square sections, and when large-format deformed round bars became available around 1957, the industry manufactured them to provide the cross-sectional area equivalent of standard square bar sizes that were formerly used. The diameter of the equivalent large-format round shape is rounded to the nearest 1/8 inch to provide the bar size. For example, #9 bar has a cross section of 1.00 square inch (6.5 cm^{2}), and therefore a diameter of 1.128 inches (28.7 mm). #10, #11, #14, and #18 sizes correspond to 1 1/8 inch, 1 1/4, 1 1/2, and 2-inch square bars, respectively.

Sizes smaller than #3 are no longer recognized as standard sizes. These are most commonly manufactured as plain round undeformed rod steel but can be made with deformations. Sizes smaller than #3 are typically referred to as "wire" products and not "bar" and specified by either their nominal diameter or wire gage number. #2 bars are often informally called "pencil rod" as they are about the same size as a pencil.

When US/Imperial sized rebar are used in projects with metric units, the equivalent metric size is typically specified as the nominal diameter rounded to the nearest millimeter. These are not considered standard metric sizes, and thus is often referred to as a soft conversion or the "soft metric" size. The US/Imperial bar size system recognizes the use of true metric bar sizes (No. 10, 12, 16, 20, 25, 28, 32, 36, 40, 50 and 60 specifically) which indicates the nominal bar diameter in millimeters, as an "alternate size" specification. Substituting a true metric size for a US/Imperial size is called a hard conversion, and sometimes results in the use of a physically different sized bar.

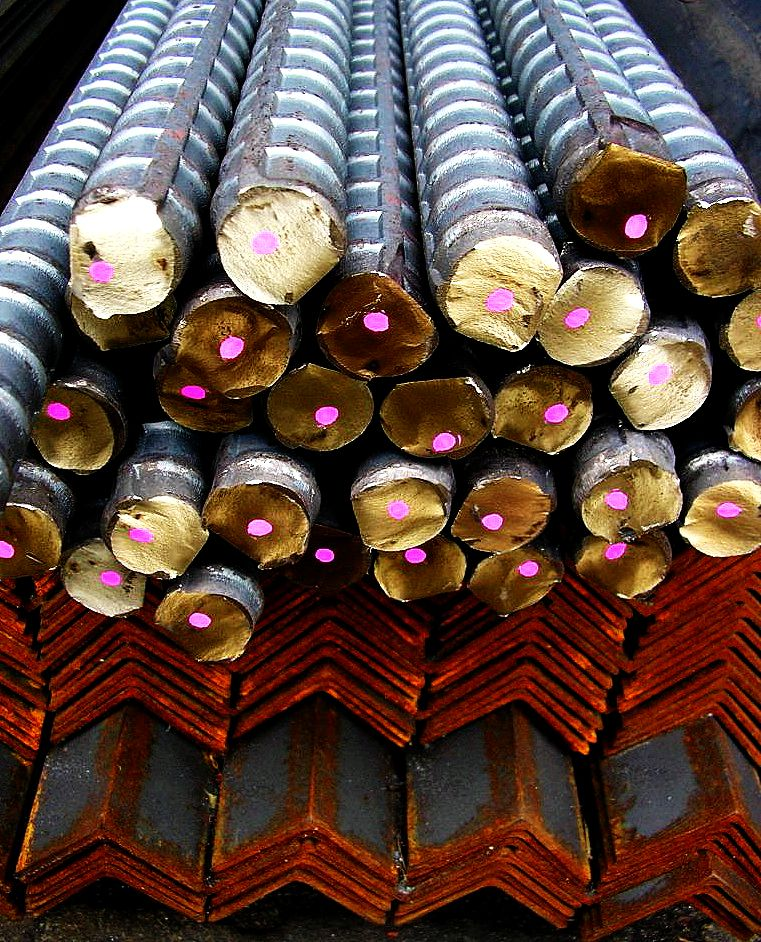
Steel reinforcement bars with color codes indicating the grade

US rebar size chart
Imperial bar size	Metric bar size (soft)	Linear mass density		Nominal diameter		Nominal area	
Imperial bar size	Metric bar size (soft)	lb/ft	kg/m	(in)	(mm)	(in^{2})	(mm^{2})
#2 (Note: Historic size designation that is no longer in common use.)	No.6	0.167	0.249	0.250 = 2/8 = 1/4	6.35	0.05	32
#3	No.10	0.376	0.560	0.375 = 3/8	9.53	0.11	71
#4	No.13	0.668	0.994	0.500 = 4/8 = 1/2	12.7	0.20	129
#5	No.16	1.043	1.552	0.625 = 5/8	15.9	0.31	200
#6	No.19	1.502	2.235	0.750 = 6/8 = 3/4	19.1	0.44	284
#7	No.22	2.044	3.042	0.875 = 7/8	22.2	0.60	387
#8	No.25	2.670	3.973	1.000 = 8/8	25.4	0.79	510
#9	No.29	3.400	5.060	1.128 ≈ 9/8	28.7	1.00	645
#10	No.32	4.303	6.404	1.270 ≈ 10/8	32.3	1.27	819
#11	No.36	5.313	7.907	1.410 ≈ 11/8	35.8	1.56	1,006
#14	No.43	7.650	11.384	1.693 ≈ 14/8	43.0	2.25	1,452
#18	No.57	13.60	20.239	2.257 ≈ 18/8	57.3	4.00	2,581

=== Canadian sizes ===
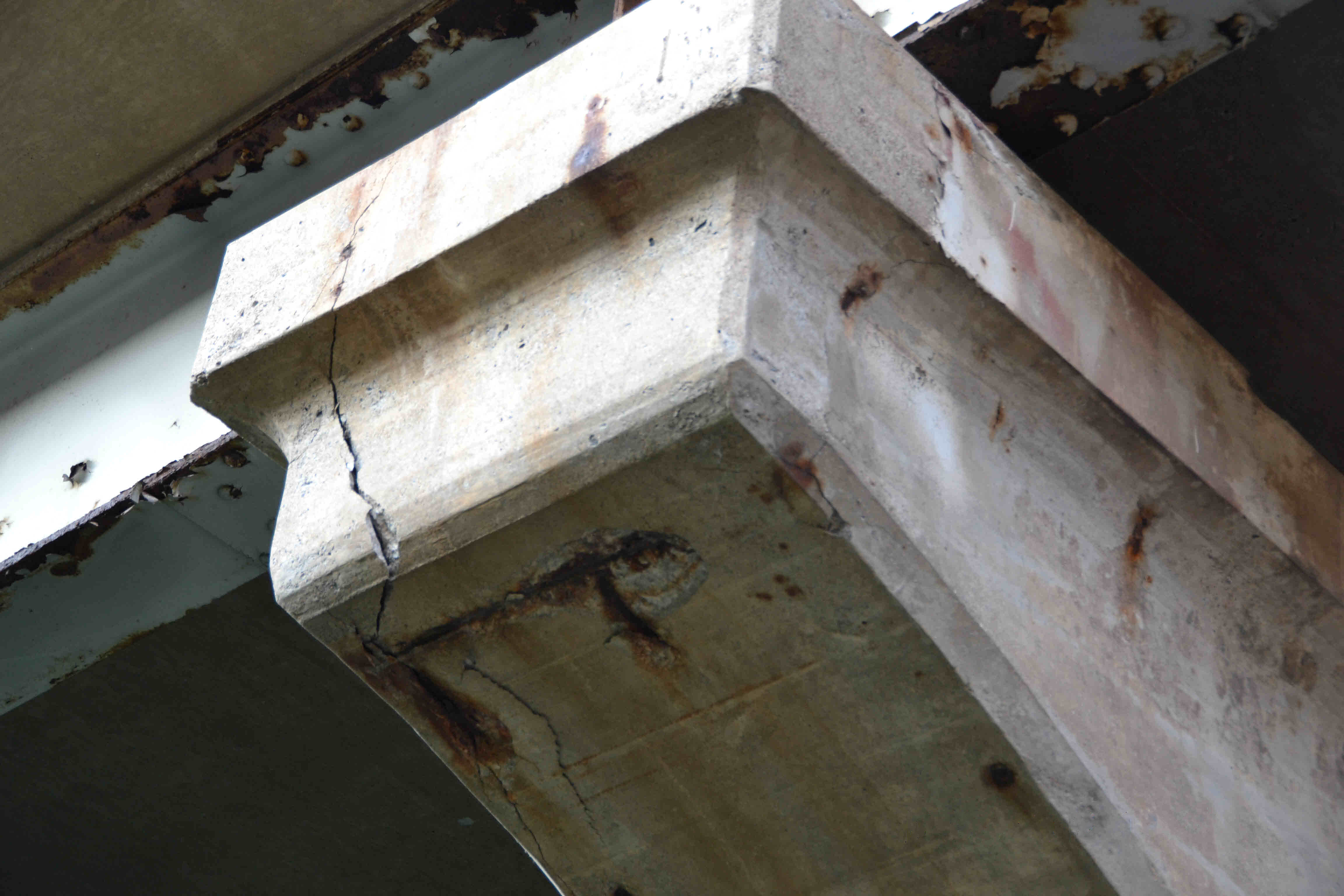
Concrete betraying corroded rebar within it at the Queen Elizabeth Way bridge over the Welland River in Niagara Falls, Ontario, Canada

Metric bar designations represent the nominal bar diameter in millimeters, rounded to the nearest 5 mm.

Metric bar size	Linear Mass Density (kg/m)	Nominal diameter (mm)	Cross-sectional Area (mm^{2})
10M	0.785	11.3	100
15M	1.570	16.0	200
20M	2.355	19.5	300
25M	3.925	25.2	500
30M	5.495	29.9	700
35M	7.850	35.7	1000
45M	11.775	43.7	1500
55M	19.625	56.4	2500

=== European sizes ===
Metric bar designations represent the nominal bar diameter in millimetres. Preferred bar sizes in Europe are specified to comply with Table 6 of the standard EN 10080, although various national standards still remain in force (e.g. BS 4449 in the United Kingdom). In Switzerland some sizes are different from European standard.

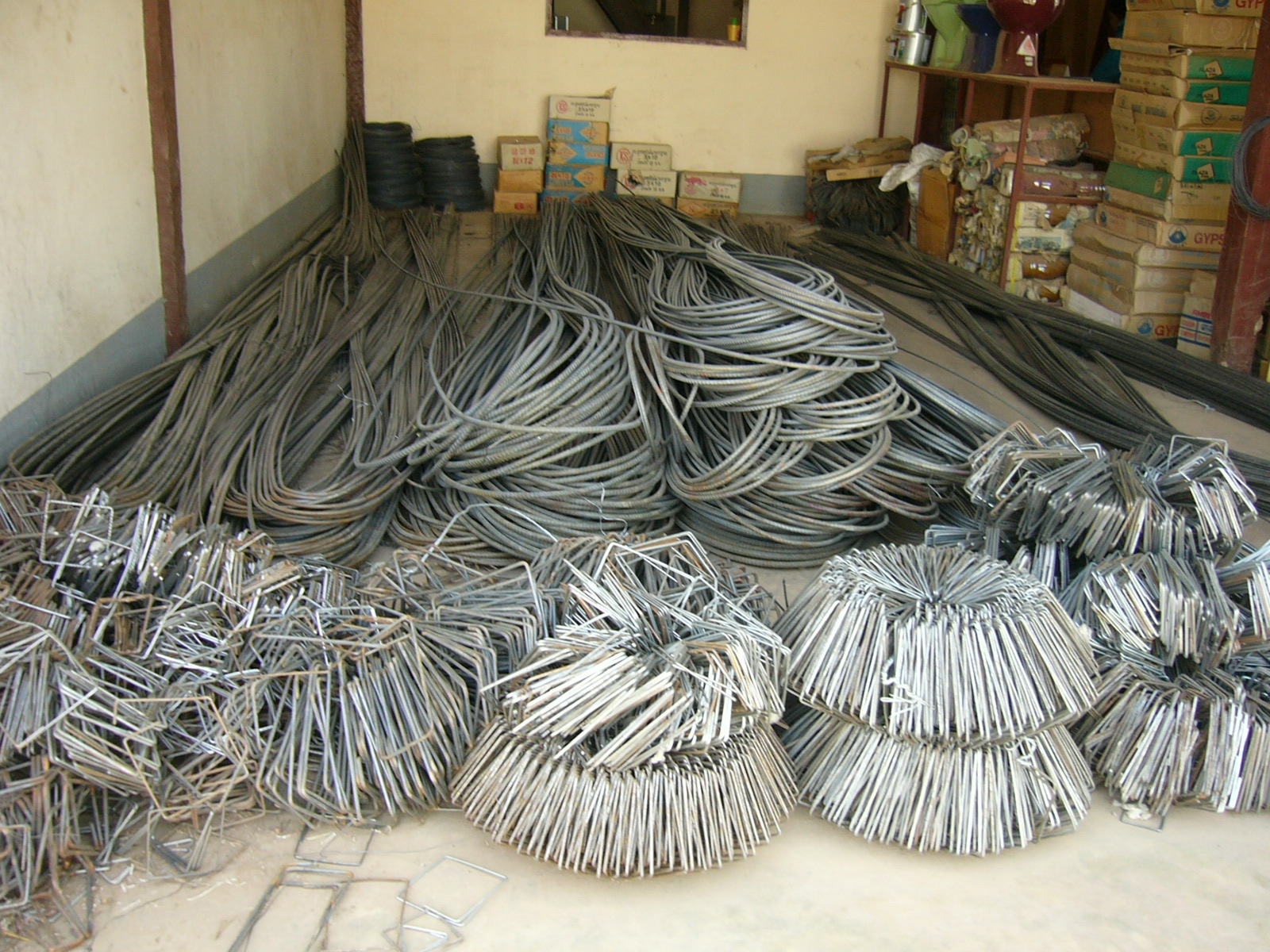
Steel reinforcement in storage

Metric bar size	Linear mass density (kg/m)	Nominal diameter (mm)	Cross-sectional area (mm^{2})
6,0	0.222	6	28.3
8,0	0.395	8	50.3
10,0	0.617	10	78.5
12,0	0.888	12	113
14,0	1.21	14	154
16,0	1.58	16	201
20,0	2.47	20	314
25,0	3.85	25	491
28,0	4.83	28	616
32,0	6.31	32	804
40,0	9.86	40	1257
50,0	15.4	50	1963

=== Australian sizes ===
Reinforcement for use in concrete construction is subject to the requirements of Australian Standards AS3600 (Concrete Structures) and AS/NZS4671 (Steel Reinforcing for Concrete). There are other standards that apply to testing, welding and galvanizing.

The designation of reinforcement is defined in AS/NZS4671 using the following formats:

Reinforcement steel bar Grade 500 Class N
Nominal Diameter (mm)	Cross-sectional area (mm sq)	Mass per metre length, kg/m
12	113	0.888
16	201	1.58
20	314	2.47
24	452	3.55
28	616	4.83
32	804	6.31
36	1020	7.99

Shape/ Section

D- deformed ribbed bar, R- round / plain bar, I- deformed indented bar

Ductility Class

L- low ductility, N- normal ductility, E- seismic (Earthquake) ductility

Standard grades (MPa)

250N, 300E, 500L, 500N, 500E

Examples:
D500N12 is deformed bar, 500 MPa strength, normal ductility and 12 mm nominal diameter – also known as "N12"

Bars are typically abbreviated to simply 'N' (hot-rolled deformed bar), 'R' (hot-rolled round bar), 'RW' (cold-drawn ribbed wire) or 'W' (cold-drawn round wire), as the yield strength and ductility class can be implied from the shape. For example, all commercially available wire has a yield strength of 500 MPa and low ductility, while round bars are 250 MPa and normal ductility.

=== New Zealand ===
Reinforcement for use in concrete construction is subject to the requirements of AS/NZS4671 (Steel Reinforcing for Concrete). There are other standards that apply to testing, welding and galvanizing.

'Reinforcement steel bar Grade 300 & 500 Class E

Nominal Diameter (mm)	Cross-sectional area (mm sq)	Mass per metre length, kg/m
6	28.3	0.222
10	78.5	0.617
12	113	0.888
16	201	1.58
20	314	2.47
25	491	3.85
32	804	6.31
40	1260	9.86

=== India ===
Rebars are available in the following grades as per IS:1786-2008 FE 415/FE 415D/FE 415S/FE 500/FE 500D/FE 500S/FE 550, FE550D, FE 600. Rebars are quenched with water at a high level pressure so that the outer surface is hardened while the inner core remains soft. Rebars are ribbed so that the concrete can have a better grip. Coastal regions use galvanized rebars to prolong their life. BIS rebar sizes are 10, 12, 16, 20, 25, 28, 32, 36, 40 and 50 millimeters.

=== Jumbo and threaded bar sizes ===
Very large format rebar sizes are widely available and produced by specialty manufacturers. The tower and sign industries commonly use "jumbo" bars as anchor rods for large structures which are fabricated from slightly oversized blanks such that threads can be cut at the ends to accept standard anchor nuts. Fully threaded rebar is also produced with very coarse threads which satisfy rebar deformation standards and allow for custom nuts and couplers to be used. These customary sizes, while in common use, do not have consensus standards associated with them, and properties may vary by manufacturer.

Jumbo rebar size chart
Imperial bar size	Metric bar size (soft)	Linear Mass Density		Nominal diameter (outside of threaded zone)		Nominal area (outside of threaded zone)	
Imperial bar size	Metric bar size (soft)	lb/ft	(kg/m)	(in)	(mm)	(in^{2})	(mm^{2})
#14J	-	9.48	14.14	1.88	47.8	2.78	1794
#18J	-	14.60	21.78	2.34	59.4	4.29	2768

Threaded rebar size chart
Imperial bar size	Metric bar size (soft)	Linear Mass Density		Maximum diameter		Nominal area	
Imperial bar size	Metric bar size (soft)	lb/ft	(kg/m)	(in)	(mm)	(in^{2})	(mm^{2})
(#18 and smaller are the same as US/Imperial sizes)
#20	No.63	16.70	24.85	2.72	69	4.91	3168
#24	No.75	24.09	35.85	3.18	81	7.06	4555
#28	No.90	32.79	48.80	3.68	94	9.62	6207
1"	No.26	3.01	4.48	1.25	32	0.85	548
1 1/4"	No.32	4.39	6.53	1.45	37	1.25	806
1 3/8"	No.36	5.56	8.27	1.63	41	1.58	1019
1 3/4"	No.46	9.23	13.73	2.01	51	2.58	1665
2 1/2"	No.65	18.20	27.08	2.80	71	5.16	3329
3"	No.75	24.09	35.85	3.15	80	6.85	4419

=== Grades ===
Rebar is available in grades and specifications that vary in yield strength, ultimate tensile strength, chemical composition, and percentage of elongation.

The use of a grade by itself only indicates the minimum permissible yield strength, and it must be used in the context of a material specification in order to fully describe product requirements for rebar. Material specifications set the requirements for grades as well as additional properties such as, chemical composition, minimum elongation, physical tolerances, etc. Fabricated rebar must exceed the grade's minimum yield strength and any other material specification requirements when inspected and tested.

In US use, the grade designation is equal to the minimum yield strength of the bar in ksi (1000 psi); for example, grade 60 rebar has a minimum yield strength of 60 ksi. Rebar is most commonly manufactured in grades 40, 60, and 75 with higher strength readily available in grades 80, 100, 120 and 150. Grade 60 (420 MPa) is the most widely used rebar grade in modern US construction. Historic grades include 30, 33, 35, 36, 50 and 55, which are not in common use today.

Some grades are only manufactured for specific bar sizes; for example, under ASTM A615, Grade 40 (280 MPa) is only furnished for US bar sizes #3 through #6 (soft metric No.10 through 19). Sometimes limitations on available material grades for specific bar sizes is related to the manufacturing process used, as well as the availability of controlled quality raw materials used.

Some material specifications cover multiple grades, and in such cases it is necessary to indicate both the material specification and grade. Rebar grades are customarily noted on engineering documents, even when there are no other grade options within the material specification, in order to eliminate confusion and avoid potential quality issues such as might occur if a material substitution is made. "Gr." is the common engineering abbreviation for "grade", with variations on letter capitalization and the use of a period.

In certain cases, such as earthquake engineering and blast-resistant design where post-yield behavior is expected, it is important to be able to predict and control properties such as the maximum yield strength and minimum ratio of tensile strength to yield strength. ASTM A706 Gr. 60 is an example of a controlled property range material specification which has a minimum yield strength of 60 ksi (420 MPa), maximum yield strength of 78 ksi (540 MPa), minimum tensile strength of 80 ksi (550 MPa) and not less than 1.25 times the actual yield strength, and minimum elongation requirements that vary by bar size.

In countries that use the metric system, the grade designation is typically the yield strength in megapascals (MPa), for example grade 400 (similar to US grade 60; however, metric grade 420 is actually the exact substitution for the US grade).

Common US specifications, published by ACI and ASTM, are:

- American Concrete Institute: "ACI 318-14 Building Code Requirements for Structural Concrete and Commentary", ISBN 978-0-87031-930-3 (2014)
- ASTM A82: Specification for Plain Steel Wire for Concrete Reinforcement
- ASTM A184/A184M: Specification for Fabricated Deformed Steel Bar Mats for Concrete Reinforcement
- ASTM A185: Specification for Welded Plain Steel Wire Fabric for Concrete Reinforcement
- ASTM A496: Specification for Deformed Steel Wire for Concrete Reinforcement
- ASTM A497: Specification for Welded Deformed Steel Wire Fabric for Concrete Reinforcement
- ASTM A615/A615M-26: Deformed and plain carbon-steel bars for concrete reinforcement*ASTM A616/A616M: Specification for Rail-Steel Deformed and Plain Bars for Concrete Reinforcement
- ASTM A617/A617M: Specification for Axle-Steel Deformed and Plain Bars for Concrete Reinforcement
- ASTM A706/A706M: Low-alloy steel deformed and plain bars for concrete reinforcement
- ASTM A722/A722M: Standard Specification for High-Strength Steel Bars for Prestressed Concrete
- ASTM A767/A767M: Specification for Zinc-Coated (Galvanized) Steel Bars for Concrete Reinforcement
- ASTM A775/A775M: Specification for Epoxy-Coated Reinforcing Steel Bars
- ASTM A934/A934M: Specification for Epoxy-Coated Prefabricated Steel Reinforcing Bars
- ASTM A955: Deformed and plain stainless-steel bars for concrete reinforcement (Supplementary Requirement S1 is used when specifying magnetic permeability testing)
- ASTM A996: Rail-steel and axle-steel deformed bars for concrete reinforcement
- ASTM A1035: Standard Specification for Deformed and Plain, Low-carbon, Chromium, Steel Bars for Concrete Reinforcement

ASTM marking designations are:

- 'S' billet A615
- 'I' rail A616 ("ASTM A616 / A616M - 96a Standard Specification for Rail Steel Deformed and Plain Bars for Concrete Reinforcement (Withdrawn 1999, superseded by A996)". Astm.org.)
- 'IR' Rail Meeting Supplementary Requirements S1 A616 "ASTM A616 / A616M - 96a Standard Specification for Rail Steel Deformed and Plain Bars for Concrete Reinforcement (Withdrawn 1999, superseded by A996)". Astm.org.)
- 'A' Axle A617 "ASTM A617 / A617M - 96a Standard Specification for Axle Steel Deformed and Plain Bars for Concrete Reinforcement (Withdrawn 1999, superseded by A996)". Astm.org.)
- 'W' Low-alloy — A706

Historically in Europe, rebar is composed of mild steel material with a yield strength of approximately 250 MPa (36 ksi). Modern rebar is composed of high-yield steel, with a yield strength more typically 500 MPa (72.5 ksi). Rebar can be supplied with various grades of ductility. The more ductile steel is capable of absorbing considerably more energy when deformed – a behavior that resists earthquake forces and is used in design. These high-yield-strength ductile steels are usually produced using the TEMPCORE process, a method of thermomechanical processing. The manufacture of reinforcing steel by re-rolling finished products (e.g. sheets or rails) is not allowed. In contrast to structural steel, rebar steel grades are not harmonized yet across Europe, each country having their own national standards. However, some standardization of specification and testing methods exist under EN 10080 and EN ISO 15630:

- BS EN 10080: Steel for the reinforcement of concrete. Weldable reinforcing steel. General. (2005)
- BS 4449: Steel for the reinforcement of concrete. Weldable reinforcing steel. Bar, coil and decoiled product. Specification. (2005/2009)
- BS 4482: Steel wire for the reinforcement of concrete products. Specification (2005)
- BS 4483: Steel fabric for the reinforcement of concrete. Specification (2005)
- BS 6744: Stainless steel bars for the reinforcement of and use in concrete. Requirements and test methods. (2001/2009)
- DIN 488-1: Reinforcing steels - Part 1: Grades, properties, marking (2009)
- DIN 488-2: Reinforcing steels - Part 2: Reinforcing steel bars (2009)
- DIN 488-3: Reinforcing steels - Part 3: Reinforcing steel in coils, steel wire (2009)
- DIN 488-4: Reinforcing steels - Part 4: Welded fabric (2009)
- DIN 488-5: Reinforcing steels - Part 5: Lattice girders (2009)
- DIN 488-6: Reinforcing steel - Part 6: Assessment of conformity (2010)
- BS EN ISO 15630-1: Steel for the reinforcement and prestressing of concrete. Test methods. Reinforcing bars, wire rod and wire. (2010)
- BS EN ISO 15630-2: Steel for the reinforcement and prestressing of concrete. Test methods. Welded fabric. (2010)

== Placing rebar ==
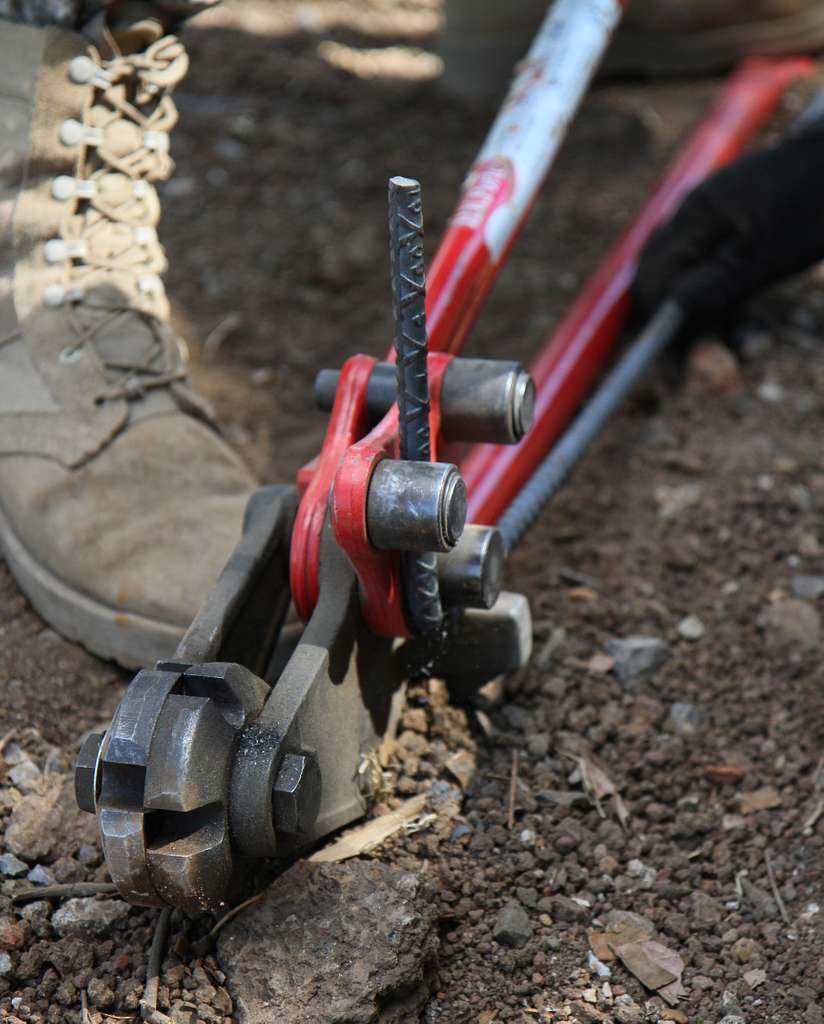
Rebar bender

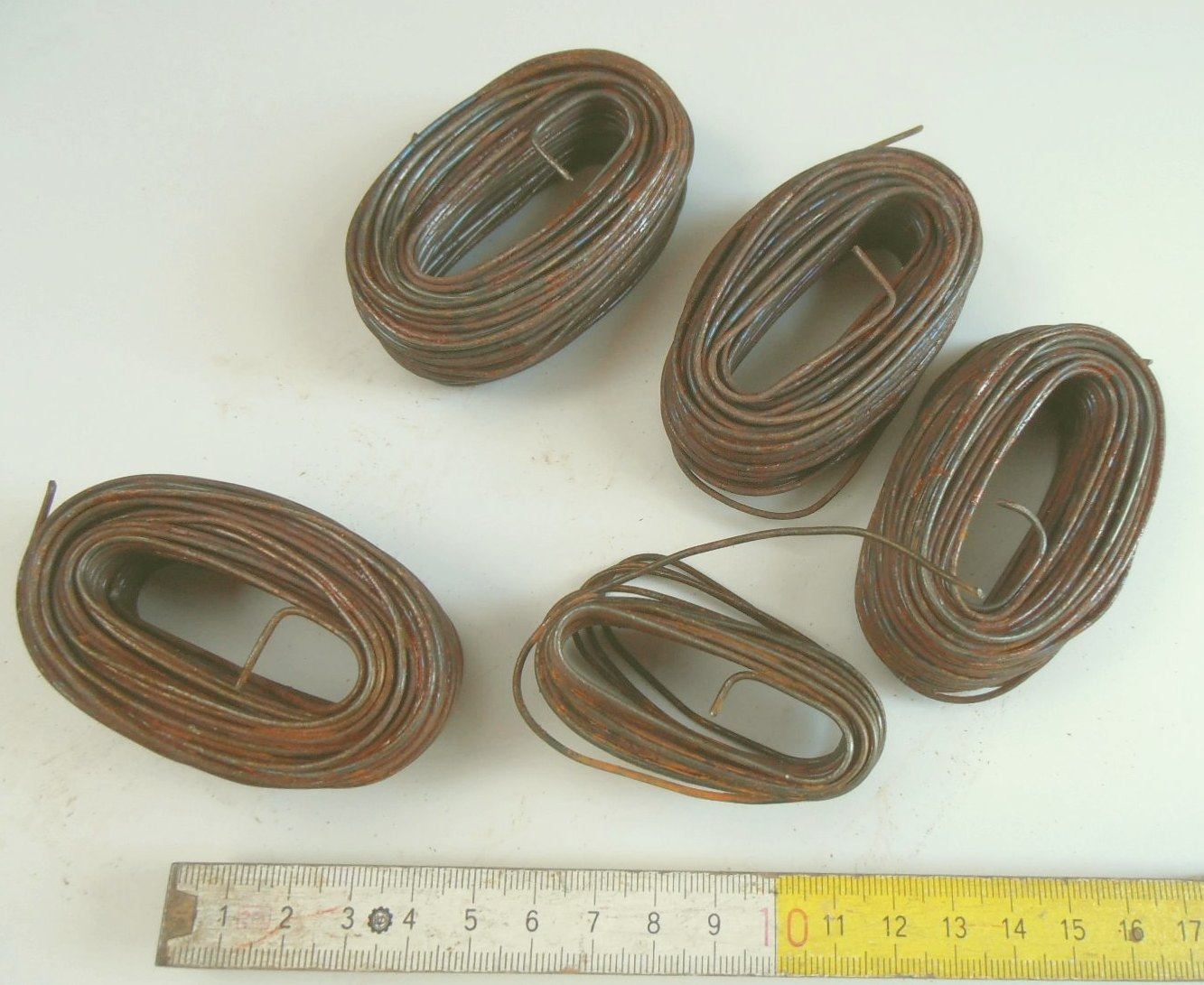
Steel wire used to secure rebar before it is set in concrete. A centimeter rule is provided for reference.

Rebar cages are fabricated either on or off the project site commonly with the help of hydraulic benders and shears. However, for small or custom work a tool known as a Hickey, or hand rebar bender, is sufficient. The rebars are placed by steel fixers ("rodbusters" or concrete reinforcing iron workers), with bar supports and concrete or plastic rebar spacers separating the rebar from the concrete formwork to establish concrete cover and ensure that proper embedment is achieved. The rebars in the cages are connected by spot welding, tying steel wire, sometimes using an electric rebar tier, or with mechanical connections. For tying epoxy-coated or galvanized rebars, epoxy-coated or galvanized wire is normally used, respectively.

=== Stirrups ===
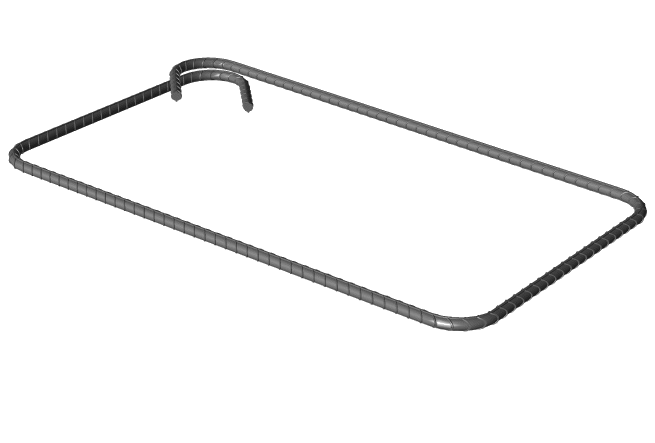
Stirrup sample

Stirrups form the outer part of a rebar cage. The function of stirrups (often referred to as 'reinforcing steel links' and 'shear links') is threefold: to give the main reinforcement bars structure, to maintain a correct level of concrete cover, and to maintain an equal transferance of force throughout the supporting elements. Stirrups are usually rectangular in beams, and circular in piers and are placed at regular intervals along a column or beam as defined by civil or structural engineers in construction drawings.

=== Welding ===
The American Welding Society (AWS) D 1.4 sets out the practices for welding rebar in the US. Without special consideration the only rebar that is ready to weld is W grade (Low-alloy — A706). Rebar that is not produced to the ASTM A706 specification is generally not suitable for welding without calculating the "carbon-equivalent". Material with a carbon-equivalent of less than 0.55 can be welded.

ASTM A 616 & ASTM A 617 (now replaced by the combined standard A996) reinforcing bars are re-rolled rail steel and re-rolled rail axle steel with uncontrolled chemistry, phosphorus and carbon content. These materials are not common.

Rebar cages are normally tied together with wire, although spot welding of cages has been the norm in Europe for many years, and is becoming more common in the United States. High strength steels for prestressed concrete cannot be welded.

=== Reinforcement placement in rolls ===
Roll reinforcement system is a fast and cost-efficient method for placing a large quantity of reinforcement over a short period of time. Roll reinforcement is usually prepared off-site and efficiently unrolled on site. Roll reinforcement placement has been applied successfully in slabs (decks, foundations), wind energy mast foundations, walls, ramps, etc.

=== Mechanical connections ===
Also known as "mechanical couplers" or "mechanical splices", mechanical connections are used to connect reinforcing bars together. Mechanical couplers are an effective means to reduce rebar congestion in highly reinforced areas for cast-in-place concrete construction. These couplers are also used in precast concrete construction at the joints between members.

The structural performance criteria for mechanical connections varies between countries, codes, and industries. As a minimum requirement, codes typically specify that the rebar to splice connection meets or exceeds 125% of the specified yield strength of the rebar. More stringent criteria also requires the development of the specified ultimate strength of the rebar. As an example, ACI 318 specifies either Type 1 (125% Fy) or Type 2 (125% Fy and 100% Fu) performance criteria.

For concrete structures designed with ductility in mind, it is recommended that the mechanical connections are also capable of failing in a ductile manner, typically known in the reinforcing steel industry as achieving "bar-break". As an example, Caltrans specifies a required mode of failure (i.e., "necking of the bar").

=== Safety ===
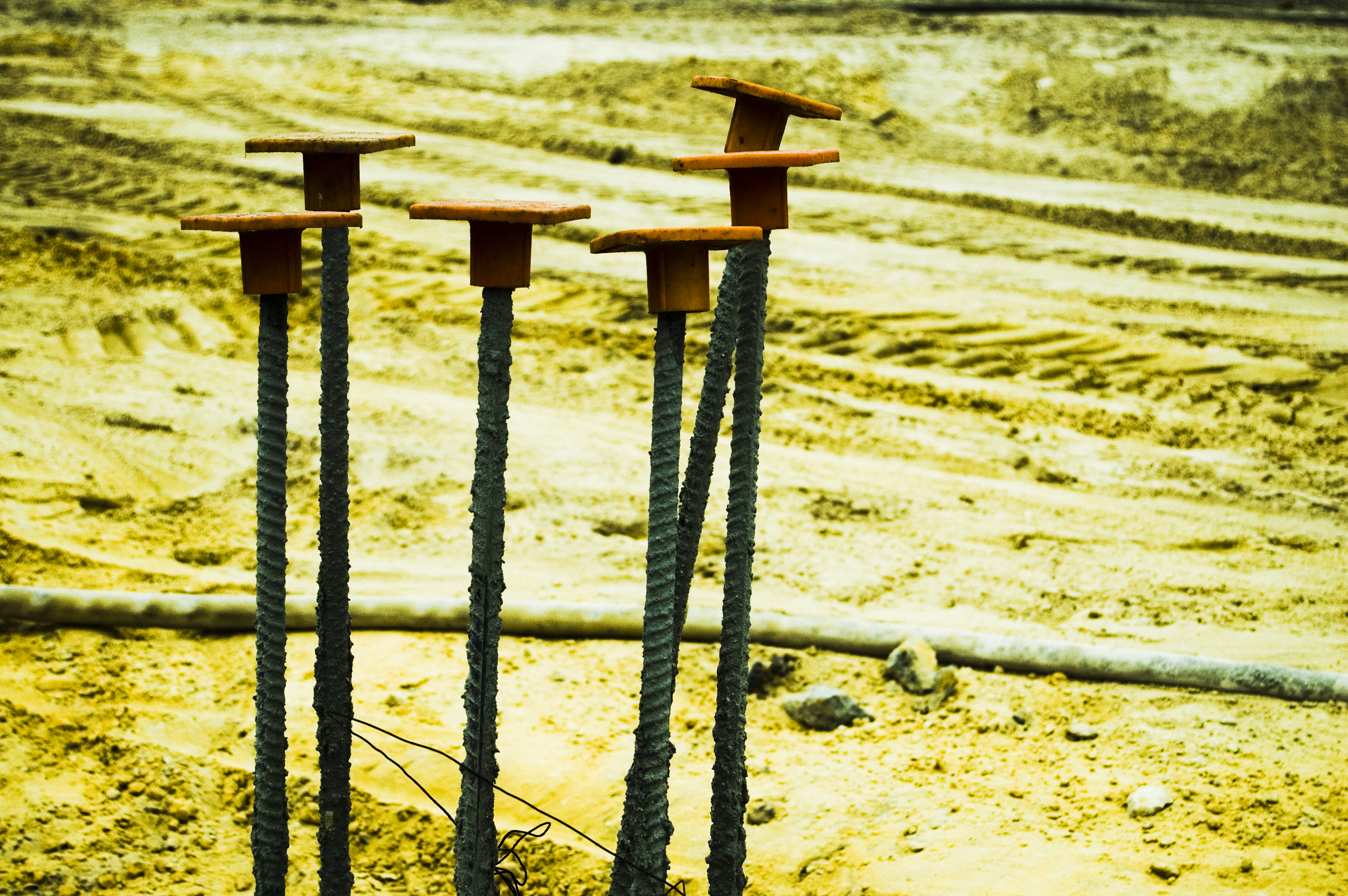
Rebars with temporary plastic safety caps installed

To prevent injury, the protruding ends of steel rebar are often bent over or covered with special steel-reinforced plastic caps.

== Designations ==
Reinforcement is usually tabulated in a "reinforcement schedule" on construction drawings. This eliminates ambiguity in the notations used around the world. The following list provides examples of the notations used in the architectural, engineering, and construction industry.

New Zealand
Designation	Explanation
HD-16-300, T&B, EW	High strength (500 MPa) 16 mm diameter rebars spaced at 300 mm centers (center-to-center distance) on both the top and bottom face and in each way as well (i.e., longitudinal and transverse).
3-D12	Three mild strength (300 MPa) 12 mm diameter rebars
R8 Stirrups @ 225 MAX	D grade (300 MPa) smooth bar stirrups, spaced at 225 mm centres. By default in New Zealand practice all stirrups are normally interpreted as being full, closed, loops. This is a detailing requirement for concrete ductility in seismic zones; If a single strand of stirrup with a hook at each end was required, this would typically be both specified and illustrated.

United States
Designation	Explanation
#4 @ 12 OC, T&B, EW	Number 4 rebars spaced 12 inches on center (center-to-center distance) on both the top and bottom faces and in each way as well, i.e. longitudinal and transverse.
(3) #4	Three number 4 rebars (usually used when the rebar perpendicular to the detail)
#3 ties @ 9 OC, (2) per set	Number 3 rebars used as stirrups, spaced at 9 inches on center. Each set consists of two ties, which is usually illustrated.
#7 @ 12" EW, EF	Number 7 rebar spaced 12 inches apart, placed in each direction (each way) and on each face.

== Reuse and recycling ==
Rebar is frequently recycled, and rebar is often made entirely from recycled steel. Nucor, the largest steel producer in the United States, claims its steel bar products are made from 97% recycled steel.

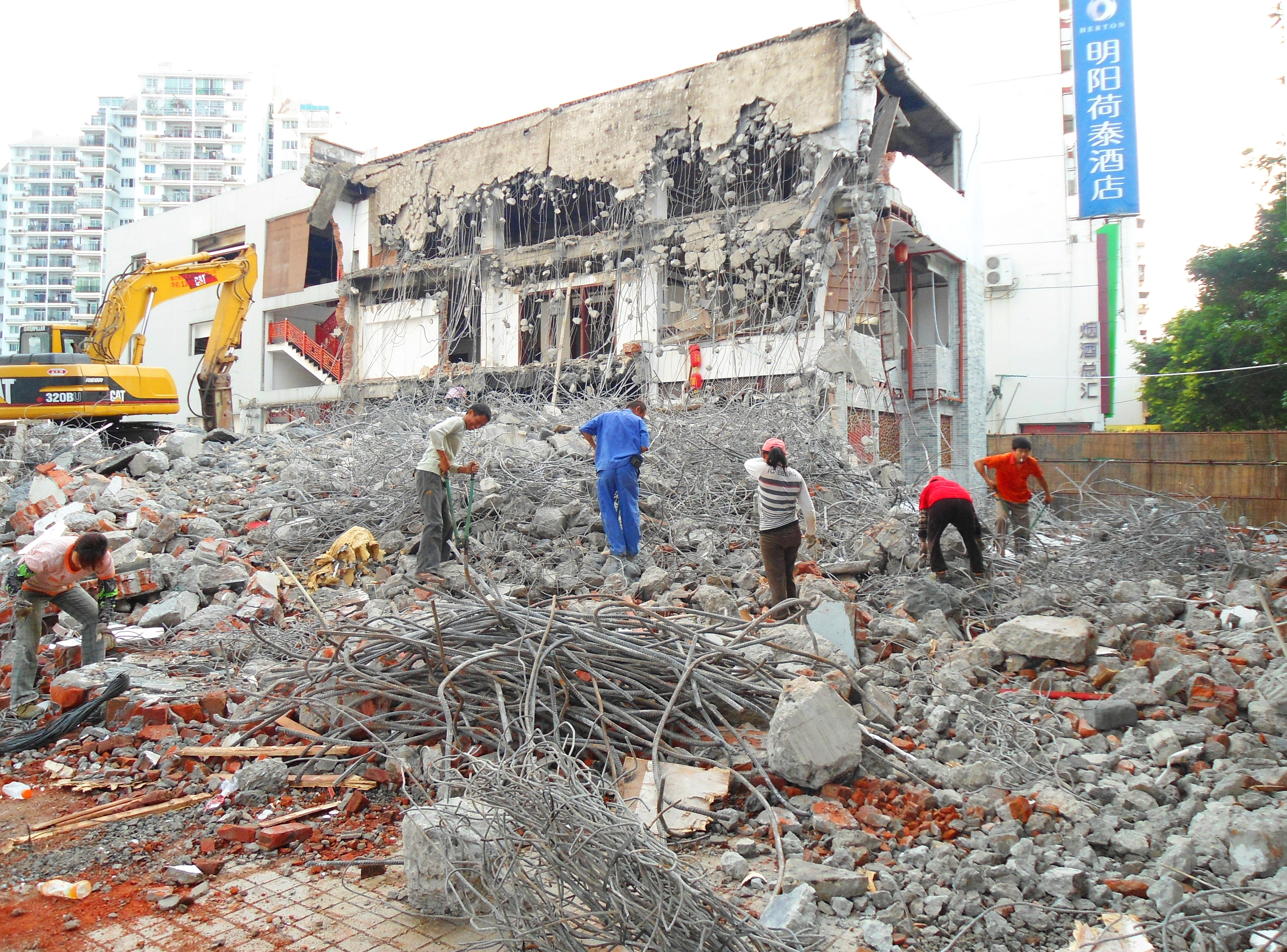
Workers extracting rebar from demolition rubble in China
