= Ferriols =

Ferriols is a surname. Notable people with the surname include:

- John Ferriols (born 1974), Filipino basketball player
- Mickey Ferriols (born 1973), American-born Filipino actress
- Roque Ferriols (1924–2021), Filipino Jesuit philosopher

== See also ==
- Ferriola
