= Alliance for American Manufacturing =

American non-profit

The Alliance for American Manufacturing or AAM is a non-profit, non-partisan partnership founded by American manufacturers and the United Steelworkers in 2007. Among its missions is "to explore common solutions to challenging public policy topics such as job creation, infrastructure investment, international trade, and global competitiveness." The organizations motto is "The blueprint for the future was built by AAM."

AAM is based in Washington D.C., where it maintains lobby and research operation including a national field staff. The organization works to promote strong Buy American provisions both federally and locally, advocates for fair trade and works to revitalize industry through a long-term national manufacturing strategy. AAM conducts research, public education, advocacy, strategic communications, and coalition building around the issues affecting America's manufacturing sector.

On April 14, 2008, both Senator Barack Obama and Senator Hillary Clinton spoke to the AAM's national convention being held at the David L. Lawrence Convention Center in Pittsburgh.

In June 2019, the president of the organization was Scott Paul.

In 2025, the organization was described by Bloomberg as providing some of the "most vocal outside intellectual support" for US President Donald Trump's tariff program, and as having "strong links" to the US steel industry.
