= Magna Corporation =

Magna Corporation was a publicly held company in Flowood, Mississippi, U.S.A. that served as a holding company. Its primary divisions were Mississippi Steel and Magna American. Mississippi Steel was Mississippi's first steel manufacturer beginning operations in 1957. Magna American built garden tillers and other items, as well as manufacturing the Amphicat in Raymond, Mississippi.

In 1984 the company's President, Wesley A. Caldwell, Jr., resigned.

In 1985, the steel division was sold to Birmingham Steel Corporation for approximately 28 million dollars. Magna's controlling stockholders, the Caldwell family of Jackson, Mississippi, took the company private by distributing half the sale proceeds to the stockholders. The Magna American plant was mothballed, then donated to Hinds Community College in 1992.

In 1985, the United States Securities and Exchange Commission sued former company president Wesley A. Caldwell, Jr., of Brandon, Mississippi, claiming that he had received benefits from the company "without review and approval" and violated the Securities Exchange Act of 1934.
