= John J. Ferriola =

American businessperson

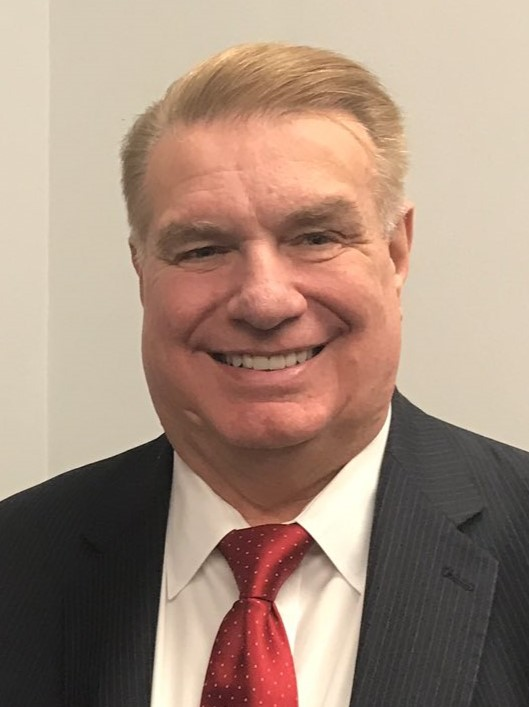
- Born: John James Ferriola; 1952 or 1953 (age 73–74)
- Education: State University of New York
- Occupation: Businessman
- Title: Former chairman, CEO and president, Nucor
- Term: January 2014-December 2019
- Successor: Leon Topalian

John James Ferriola (born 1952/53) is an American businessman and was the chairman, CEO, and president of Nucor from January 2014 to December 2019.

Ferriola received a bachelor's degree in electrical engineering from the State University of New York Maritime College.

Ferriola was president of Nucor since January 2011, CEO since January 2013, and chairman since January 2014. He retired at the end of 2019, and was succeeded by longtime Nucor executive Leon Topalian as CEO and president.

He was chairman of the World Steel Association from 2016 to 2017. He has also served as chairman of the American Iron and Steel Institute.
