= F. Kenneth Iverson =

American manager (1925–2002)

- Born: September 18, 1925; Downers Grove, Illinois, U.S.
- Died: April 14, 2002 (aged 76); Charlotte, North Carolina, U.S.
- Education: Cornell University (1946); Purdue University (1947); Northwestern University
- Occupations: Chairman and CEO of Nucor

F. Kenneth Iverson (September 18, 1925 – April 14, 2002) was the chairman and CEO of Nucor. He is credited with transforming Nucor from a nearly bankrupt company in the 1960s into the largest and most successful steelmaker in the United States.

== Biography ==
=== Early life and education ===
Iverson was born in Downers Grove, Illinois. From 1943 to 1944, he attended Northwestern University, but left to serve in the United States Navy in World War II, where he achieved the rank of lieutenant. In 1946, he graduated from Cornell University with a degree in aeronautical engineering. He received a master's degree in mechanical engineering from Purdue University in 1947.

=== Career ===
Iverson was a research physicist for International Harvester for five years. In 1953, he joined Illium Corporation as chief engineer. He took a temporary job with Indiana Steel Products to establish a spectrographic laboratory. He then joined Cannon Muskegon as chief metallurgist and eventually, sales manager. In 1960, he became executive vice president for Coast Metals Company.

In 1961, Nuclear Corporation of America hired Iverson as general manager. In March 1965, the company filed for bankruptcy. Iverson, head of the only profitable division, took over as head of the company due to lack of interest in the job from others. One of his first initiatives was to racially integrate the company. The company changed its name to Nucor in 1972.

Iverson resigned as CEO of Nucor in 1996 and retired as chairman in 1998.

== Management philosophy ==
Iverson vigorously advocated a lean management staff, decentralized decision-making structure, and egalitarian work environment. At Nucor, he brought the number of levels of management down to four - a janitor was four promotions away from the CEO's job. He located the corporate headquarters in suburban Charlotte, North Carolina, away from any production facilities, and gave each mill great leeway in its own marketing and production decisions. Under his leadership, Nucor eliminated executive perks such as company cars, and reserved parking spaces. A staff of 50 in the corporate office was sufficient for managing the entire corporation, one of the smallest corporate staffs of any Fortune 500 company.

Iverson's management philosophy was featured in Good to Great by James C. Collins.

== Publications ==
- Plain Talk: Lessons from a Business Maverick (Iverson with Varian, 1997).

== Achievements and awards ==
- 2012 - Inducted into the inaugural class of the American Metal Market Steel Hall of Fame
- 1997 - Inducted to North Carolina Business Hall of Fame
- 1994 - Elected to the National Academy of Engineering
- 1991 - Received the National Medal of Technology and Innovation from George H. W. Bush
- 1991 - Received the Willie Korf Award by American Metal Market
- 1991 - Named U.S. Steelmaker of the Year by Iron Age

== Personal life ==
Iverson was married to his wife, Martha, for 56 years. They had a daughter, Claudia Sturges and a son, Marc Miller; both lived in Charlotte. He died in Charlotte of complications from emphysema and heart trouble.
