= Mississippi Steel =

Coordinates: 32.313299°N 90.135778°W

Mississippi Steel Corporation was a publicly traded company located in Flowood, Mississippi. It was the first steel mill built in the state, and its primary product has always been reinforcing bar steel. Its first incarnation ran from 1957 until 1985 when it was bought by Birmingham Steel Corporation, United States. The mill is still in business as part of Nucor.

In 1956, both The Clarion-Ledger and The State Times newspapers reported that the area just to the east of Jackson had been carefully leveed to sustain industrial development. Per the State Times article, Wesley A. "Cotton" Caldwell is named the first chairman of the board, and production of merchant products and rebar should commence within one year.

In 1985, The Clarion Ledger reported the sale of substantially all of the assets of Mississippi Steel Division of Magna Corporation, a Mississippi corporation, to Birmingham Steel Corporation. Birmingham Steel operated two similar "Mini-Mills" in Alabama and Illinois. The majority shareholders of Magna Corporation, the Caldwell family, intend to use the proceeds of the sale to purchase all outstanding shares of Magna Corporation thus taking the company private.

December 10, 2002: steelnews.com reports Nucor completes purchase of Mississippi Steel plant along with three other mills from the bankrupt Birmingham Steel Corporation.

Mississippi has a second steel mill now after 2000. Per www.severcorr.com, SeverCorr has opened a new steel mill located in the Golden Triangle area of Northeast Mississippi, thus making it the second steel manufacturer in the state. This plant plans to primarily serve the region's growing automotive industry.
