= The Coalition for a Prosperous America =

US lobbying group

The Coalition for a Prosperous America (CPA) is a lobbying organization based in Washington, D.C., representing manufacturing companies that want the United States government to do more to protect them from foreign competition. As of November 2024, its CEO was Michael Stumo.

The CPA has supported US import taxes for the purpose of supporting the US manufacturing industry. In 2025, it was described by Bloomberg as providing some of the "most vocal outside intellectual support" for US President Donald Trump's tariff program, and as having "strong links" to the US steel industry.
