= EN 10080 =

The EN 10080: Steel for the reinforcement of concrete is a European Standard. This standard is referenced by EN 1992. This standard specifies general requirements and definitions for performance characteristics of steel reinforcement suitable for welding, which is used for reinforcement of concrete structures, supplied as finished products:

- rods, coils (wire rod, wire) and unwound products;
- reinforcement meshes automatically welded in factory conditions;
- spatial scaffolds.

Steel conforming to this standard has a corrugated, periodically profiled or smooth surface. This standard does not apply to

- Steel reinforcement not suitable for welding;
- Zinc-plated steel bars;
- Epoxy-coated steel bars;
- Corrosion-resistant steel bars;
- Prestressed steel bars;
- Periodically profiled bars;
- Further processing such as cutting or cutting and bending.

This standard does not define technical grades. The technical grades shall be determined in accordance with this standard according to the specified values for Re, Agt, Rm/Re, and Re,act/Re,nom (if applicable), fatigue strength (if applicable), flexibility, weldability, bending strength, welded or clamped joint strength (for welded reinforcement mesh or spatial frameworks) and dimensional tolerances.

== See also ==
- Eurocode
