= Leon Topalian =

American businessman

- Born: Effingham, South Carolina
- Education: Massachusetts Maritime Academy (BS)

Leon Topalian is an American businessman and the president and CEO of Nucor since January 2020.

John J. Ferriola retired at the end of 2019, and was succeeded by longtime Nucor executive Topalian as CEO and president from January 2020.

In 2021, he was elected as the chairman of The American Iron and Steel Institute’s (AISI).
