= Nucor =

American steel corporation

Nucor Corporation
- Type: Public
- Traded as: NYSE: NUE; S&P 500 component
- Industry: Steel
- Predecessor: REO Motor Car Company
- Founded: 1955; 71 years ago
- Headquarters: Charlotte, North Carolina, United States
- Key people: Leon Topalian (chairman, president, & CEO); Steve Laxton (CFO)
- Products: Steel; Rebar
- Revenue: ▼US$30.7 billion (2024)
- Net income: ▼US$2.03 billion (2024)
- Total assets: ▼US$33.9 billion (2024)
- Total equity: ▼US$21.4 billion (2024)
- Number of employees: 32,700 (2024)
- Website: nucor.com

Nucor Corporation is an American company based in Charlotte, North Carolina, that produces steel and related products. It is the largest steel producer in the United States and the largest recycler of scrap in North America. Nucor is the 16th-largest steel producer in the world. Along with Commercial Metals Company, it is one of two primary suppliers of rebar used to reinforce concrete in buildings, bridges, roads, and infrastructure in the U.S.

== Current operations ==
To supply its mills, Nucor uses electric arc furnaces and continuous casting to melt scrap steel as opposed to blast furnaces to melt iron. In 2024, the company produced and sold approximately 18.5 million tons of steel and recycled 18 million tons of scrap. None of Nucor's mills are unionized and the corporate culture is opposed to trade unions.

== History ==
After REO Motor Car Company, founded by Ransom E. Olds, sold its operations and initiated liquidation proceedings, a group of dissident activist shareholders, noticing the existence of a usable tax loss, successfully challenged the liquidation in a proxy fight in September 1955 and forced REO to take over a tiny nuclear services company called Nuclear Consultants, Inc. in a reverse takeover.

The company was renamed "Nuclear Corporation of America Inc." and relocated to offices in the Empire State Building in New York City. The organization's attempt to recast itself as a nuclear industry services company was unsuccessful, and it followed the example of other companies in the 1950s and 60s by attempting to become a conglomerate, moving its headquarters to Phoenix, Arizona. It made several acquisitions, including the Vulcraft Corporation, a steel joist manufacturer located in Florence, South Carolina. Vulcraft was founded by Sanborn Chase, who died at an early age, leaving the company to his widow. Nuclear purchased Vulcraft from Chase's widow in 1962 and hired F. Kenneth Iverson as general manager. In March 1965, the company again filed for bankruptcy. Iverson, head of the only profitable division, took over as head of the company due to lack of interest in the job from others.

Iverson reorganized Nucor around its only profitable business, the steel fabricator Vulcraft. All other businesses were either sold or liquidated. In 1966, the company moved its headquarters to Charlotte, North Carolina to be closer to its main Vulcraft plant in South Carolina. In 1968, unable to get favorable steel prices from American manufacturers and unhappy with the imported steel available at the time, Iverson, a metallurgist by training, extended Nucor vertically into steelmaking by building its first steel bar mill in Darlington, South Carolina. The company purchased an electric arc furnace, which was far cheaper than the traditional steel blast furnace, with a $6 million loan secured by all of the company's assets. Production delays and staffing problems resulted in losses, but earnings soared in 1971 and 1972. In 1972, the company, recognizing that it was now misnamed, adopted its current title, Nucor Corporation. That year, it became a public company via an initial public offering. In 1988, the company opened its building products division. In 1989, Nucor opened a facility in Crawfordsville, Indiana, the first mini mill in the world to produce flat rolled steel using thin-slab technology.

In March 2000, a joint venture, owned 47.5% by Nucor, 47.5% by BlueScope, and 5% by IHI Corporation was formed to license Castrip technology. This technology allowed for continuous casting of sheet steel directly from molten steel without the need for heavy, expensive, and energy-consuming rollers.

=== Acquisitions and divestitures ===
Date	Acquisition / Divestiture	Company	Price	Ref(s).
September 2001	Acquisition	Auburn Steel	$115 million	
May 2002	Acquisition	Birmingham Steel	$615 million	
June 2004	Acquisition	Corus Tuscaloosa	$90 million	
January 2005	Acquisition	Fort Howard Steel	Undisclosed	
April 2005	Acquisition	Marion Steel	$113 million	
June 2005	Acquisition	Connecticut Steel	$43 million	
September 2006	Acquisition	Verco Decking	$113 million	
April 2005	Acquisition	Harris Steel	$1.07 billion	
March 2008	Acquisition	David J. Joseph Company	$1.44 billion	
June 2012	Acquisition	Skyline Steel	$605 million	
October 2014	Acquisition	Gallatin Steel	$770 million	
November 2015	Acquisition	Gerdau Bright Bar assets	Undisclosed	
July 2016	Acquisition	Steel plate mill from Joy Global	$29 million	
September 2016	Acquisition	Independence Tube	$435 million	
December 2016	Acquisition	Southland Tube	$130 million	
August 2017	Acquisition	St. Louis Cold Drawn	$60 million	
December 2019	Acquisition	TrueCore Insulated Panels	Undisclosed	
July 2021	Acquisition	Insulated Metal Panels Business from Cornerstone Building Brands	$1 billion	
August 2021	Acquisition	Hannibal Industries	$370 million	
October 2021	Acquisition	Grossman Iron and Steel & Garden Street Iron & Metal	Undisclosed	
December 2021	Acquisition	Majority ownership of California Steel Industries	$130 million	
April 2022	Acquisition	Elite Storage Solutions	$75 million	
June 2022	Acquisition	Summit Utility Structures	Undisclosed	
June 2022	Acquisition	CHI Overhead Doors	$3.0 billion	
August 2022	Divestiture	David J. Joseph Company’s U-Pull-&-Pay Division	Undisclosed	
April 2024	Acquisition	Southwest Data Products	$115 million	
July 2024	Acquisition	Rytec Corporation	$565 million	

=== Closures and new investments ===
Date	Type	Description	Ref(s).
April 2017	Investment	$85 million upgrade of the rolling mill at its Marion, Ohio rebar and signpost operation	
March 2020	Production start	Joint venture with JFE Steel in Mexico	
May 2023	Closure	Longview plate mill	
August 2023	Construction start	Steel mill in Lexington, North Carolina	

=== List of CEOs ===
- F. Kenneth Iverson (1965–1996)
- John Correnti (1996–1999)
- H. David Aycock (1999–2000)
- Dan DiMicco (2000–2012)
- John J. Ferriola (2013–2019).
- Leon J. Topalian (2019–present)

=== Environmental issues ===
In 2000, Nucor agreed to spend $98 million, including $85 million for new air pollution control equipment, $4 million to monitor and reduce pollution in communities near its plants, and a $9 million civil fine to resolve allegations by the United States Department of Justice and the United States Environmental Protection Agency (EPA) that it had not adequately controlled the emission of toxic chemicals into the air, water, and soil in Alabama, Arkansas, Indiana, Nebraska, South Carolina, Texas, and Utah. The settlement was "the largest and most comprehensive environmental settlement ever with a steel manufacturer".

In 2016, the company unsuccessfully filed a lawsuit to block the EPA from adopting a plan to control visible pollution in Arkansas.

In 2023, the company signed an agreement with ExxonMobil for carbon capture and storage of up to 800,000 metric tons from its direct reduced iron plant in Convent, Louisiana. The plant had been criticized for its emissions.

== See also ==
- List of steel producers
- Good to great – 2001 management book by Jim C. Collins
