= President's Committee on the Arts and Humanities =

Advisory committee to the White House on cultural issues

The President's Committee on the Arts and the Humanities (PCAH) was an advisory committee to the President of the United States on cultural issues. It works directly with the White House and the three primary cultural agencies: the National Endowment for the Arts (NEA), National Endowment for the Humanities (NEH), and the Institute of Museum and Library Services (IMLS), as well as other federal partners and the private sector, to advance wide-ranging policy objectives in the arts and humanities. These include considerations for how the arts and humanities sectors can positively impact community well-being, economic development, public health, education, civic engagement, and climate change across the United States.

The committee is composed of both private and public members. The private members are appointed by the president and are prominent artists, scholars, philanthropists, and former state and local public officials who demonstrate commitment to the arts and humanities. Its public members include the heads of the National Endowment for the Arts; the National Endowment for the Humanities; and the Institute of Museum and Library Services. Ex officio members are the Secretary of the Smithsonian Institution; the Chairman of the Board of Trustees for the John F. Kennedy Center for the Performing Arts; the Director of the National Gallery of Art; and the head of the Library of Congress. The President also appoints a chair or co-chairs from among the private members.

In August 2017, all private committee members resigned in protest of then-president Donald Trump's response to the Unite the Right rally in Charlottesville, Virginia. Authority for the committee subsequently lapsed on September 30 under the provisions of Executive Order 13708.

On September 30, 2022 President Joe Biden reinstituted and expanded the President's Committee on the Arts and the Humanities by Executive Order 14804. Tsione Wolde-Michael, most recently the founding Director of the Smithsonian's Center for Restorative History, is the current Executive Director of PCAH. On April 13, 2023, key appointments to the Committee were announced.

On January 20, 2025, President Trump disbanded the committee by executive order after taking office as the nation's 47th president, reversing his predecessor Joe Biden's executive order reviving it.

== History ==
PCAH was established by Executive Order 12367 of June 15, 1982, under President Ronald Reagan. PCAH plays a unique role in bringing together the White House, federal agencies, civic organizations, corporations, foundations and individuals to strengthen the United States' national investment in its cultural life. The committee has a strong track record of addressing pressing policy questions in the arts and humanities, initiating public/private partnerships in those disciplines, and recognizing excellence in the field. PCAH has also conducted major research and policy analysis, and catalyzed important federal cultural programs, both domestic and international. Central to the PCAH mission is using the power of the arts and humanities to contribute to the vibrancy of our society, the education of diverse publics, the creativity of our citizens and the strength of our democracy.

=== 2017 Trump Administration Resignations ===
On August 18, 2017, 16 of the 17 committee members, including Kal Penn and Chuck Close, resigned in protest of President Donald Trump's response to the Unite the Right rally in Charlottesville, Virginia. The resigning commissioners stated in a letter to the president, "Reproach and censure in the strongest possible terms are necessary following your support of the hate groups and terrorists who killed and injured fellow Americans in Charlottesville." The initial letters of each paragraph of the resignation letter spell 'RESIST'. The only member of the committee who did not immediately sign the letter was theater and film director George C. Wolfe, whose representatives stated that he, too, would be resigning and would add his name to the letter. PCAH became the first White House affiliate to quit the Trump administration.

The White House responded with a statement reading in part, "Earlier this month it was decided that President Trump will not renew the Executive Order for the President's Committee on the Arts and the Humanities (PCAH), which expires later this year."

Andrew Weinstein, who had been appointed to the committee by President Obama, went on to serve on the board of the Holocaust Memorial Museum.

=== September 2022 Reinstitution ===
Under a new Executive Order issued by President Joe Biden on September 30, 2022, the President's Committee on the Arts and the Humanities was officially reinstituted. The Executive Order outlines that PCAH will continue to provide recommendations to the White House, the National Endowment for the Arts, the National Endowment for the Humanities, and the Institute of Museum and Library Services to advance wide-ranging policy objectives in the arts and humanities, helping to support advance the economic development, well-being, and resilience of all communities, especially those that have historically been underserved.

The President noted that, "The arts, the humanities, and museum and library services are essential to the well-being, health, vitality, and democracy of our Nation. They are the soul of America, reflecting our multicultural and democratic experience. They further help us strive to be the more perfect Union to which generation after generation of Americans have aspired. They inspire us; provide livelihoods; sustain, anchor, and bring cohesion within diverse communities across our Nation; stimulate creativity and innovation; help us understand and communicate our values as a people; compel us to wrestle with our history and enable us to imagine our future; invigorate and strengthen our democracy; and point the way toward progress."

On November 21, 2022, President Joe Biden officially appointed Tsione Wolde-Michael as the new executive director of PCAH.

On April 13, 2023, President Biden appointed 24 members of the committee, including Co-Chairs Lady Gaga and Bruce Cohen.

In this new iteration, PCAH's mission affirmed: "the arts and humanities as essential pillars of a democratic society. Together with public and private partners, we create opportunities to support the arts and humanities' ability to foster joy, resilience, and connection, which are vital to the human experience. Our work is grounded in the fundamental belief that creativity, diversity, and democracy are intrinsically bound, and that the arts and the humanities can be a powerful force for social change."

From July 2023-January 2025, the committee met 6 times. Official meetings were held at the White House, Camp David, and virtually. As early as September 2024, the committee initiated recommendations and research in seven priority areas in partnership with public and private partners. These priority areas reflected the nation's most pressing issues in the arts and humanities fields and addressed the mandate put forth by President Biden. Additionally, the committee also focused on a creation of an "Archive of Joy" as a public awareness campaign to combat the "epidemic of loneliness" as referenced by former Surgeon General Vivek Murthy.

The initial seven priority areas of the reinstituted PCAH included: Artists for Understanding: This initiative that brought together the NEA, NEH, and IMLS along with a diverse community of artists and cultural luminaries who share a common belief in the power of the arts and humanities to counter all forms of hate. The initiative was created to support artists doing work to encourage dialogue and cross-cultural exchange in their communities" Artists for Understanding was launched in five cities across the country including New York, Dearborn, Minneapolis, San Jose, and Houston. Art & Community Infrastructure: This research-driven initiative supported PCAH recommendations by amplifying the ways art fosters economic growth, enhances public health, and cultivates civic engagement. Artificial Intelligence: PCAH supported convenings that served as dynamic forums where thought leaders from across the humanities, technology industry, and creative sectors could share best practices for the thoughtful integration of the arts and humanities into the uses and development of AI. The first collaborative convening, "Creativity + Tech Summit" was held by the Kennedy Center in September of 2024. Non-profit theater sector convening: PCAH committed to exploring the health and longevity of the performing arts through a series of convenings that would bring together innovative practitioners from the non-profit theater sector, arts and humanities leaders, and major funders. The inaugural convening was held in collaboration with IMLS and NEA in October 2024. Libraries and Placemaking: PCAH collaborated with IMLS and the Library of Congress to support libraries and placemaking work. Pilot projects explored leveraging libraries' unique resources and infrastructure to cultivate responsive learning environments, support existing library networks, and nurture community interests. Rapid Response & Recovery for Arts and Cultural Heritage: PCAH coordinated with the federal agencies to evaluate preparedness and relief strategies of cultural organizations before disaster strikes. Working alongside non-profit partners to create a pilot and coalition for at-risk sites across the country, this collaboration aimed to fortify the resilience of our nation's cultural heritage and elevate the role of the arts and humanities in the process of recovery for communities impacted by disaster events. Repatriation and Ethical Returns: PCAH collaborated with Native American Tribes, Native American serving museums and professional organizations, and federal agencies to encourage stronger collaboration on NAGPRA policy. Proposed convenings sought to empower agencies and museums to adopt the highest standards and practices for repatriation, ethical returns, and shared stewardship, through increased government support and coordination. The inaugural convening was held in January 2025.

In addition to these priority areas, the PCAH also produced special events for the White House, bringing together the NEA, NEH, and IMLS as sponsors and the Smithsonian Institution as a consulting body. This included two events celebrating Juneteenth's historic designation as a federal holiday. The first event was produced with the Domestic Policy Council titled "Juneteenth: Protecting and Honoring Our Nation's African American History." The second event was a concert on the South Lawn of the White House attended by President Biden, First Lady and Honorary PCAH Chair Jill Biden, Vice President Kamala Harris, and Second Gentleman Doug Emhoff along with 2,000 attendees. Both events were later streamed on YouTube for the public. Two months before the committee's termination, the inaugural issue of Cambridge University's Public Humanities published an interview with several members of the committee to discuss their work, their background, and their hopes for government support of the arts and the humanities.

== Programs ==
=== National Student Poets Program ===
PCAH, the Institute of Museum and Library Services, and the nonprofit Alliance for Young Artists & Writers partnered to present the National Student Poets Program (NSPP), the nation's highest honor for young poets (grades 9–11) creating original work. Five students are annually selected for one year of service as literary ambassadors, each representing a geographic region of the country. By elevating and showcasing their work for a national audience, the program strives to inspire other young people to achieve excellence in their own creative endeavors and promote the essential role of writing and the arts in academic and personal success.

=== Turnaround Arts ===
Turnaround Arts is a national program that brings arts education to high-poverty elementary and middle schools across the country. It was the first federal program to specifically support arts education as an improvement tool in the country's lowest-performing schools, and was run by the PCAH, in coordination with the White House, the U.S. Department of Education (USDOE), and several foundations.

=== National Arts and Humanities Youth Program Awards ===
The National Arts and Humanities Youth Program Awards recognized the country's best creative youth development programs for increasing academic achievement, graduation rates and college enrollment by engaging children and youth in the arts and humanities. Formerly titled Coming Up Taller, these annual awards focused national attention on outstanding programs across the country that promoted the creativity of America's young people, providing them learning opportunities and the chance to contribute to their communities. Accompanied by a cash award and a ceremony at the White House with the First Lady, the National Arts and Humanities Youth Program Awards not only rewarded these projects with recognition but also provided organizational and capacity building support over the course of the year.

=== Film Forward ===
Sundance Film Forward was an international touring program designed to enhance greater cultural understanding, collaboration and dialogue around the globe by engaging audiences through the exhibition of films, workshops and conversations with filmmakers. Sundance Film Forward is an initiative of the Sundance Institute, which partnered with PCAH and other federal arts programs.

=== Save America's Treasures ===
Established by Executive Order in 1998, Save America's Treasures (SAT) is a federal public-private partnership that includes the NEA, NEH, IMLS, the National Park Service (NPS), the American Architectural Foundation (AAF) and formerly PCAH. The PCAH and the National Park Service jointly oversaw the management of the federal competitive matching grant component, which helps preserve, conserve, and rescue our nation's most significant cultural and heritage resources, including historic structures, collections of artifacts, works of art, maps, manuscripts, and sound recordings. Although funding for the program was suspended, the PCAH and AAF convened a series of thought leadership forums to develop elements for framing and catalyzing a preservation strategy that built on the strengths and success of SAT.

=== Special Initiatives ===
Through its work with the private sector, PCAH was able to raise private resources, which were directed to special initiatives that supported youth programs, recognized artists, broadened arts awareness, and celebrated the nation's cultural life. Examples include:

- Educational workshops and cultural events programming at the White House
- The National Medal of Arts and National Humanities Medals
- Annual NEH Jefferson Lecture on the Humanities
- U.S. Cultural and Heritage Tourism Summit (2005)
- Juneteenth Celebration at the White House

== Leadership ==
=== Honorary chairs ===
- Jill Biden
- Melania Trump
- Michelle Obama
- Laura Bush
- Hillary Clinton

=== Committee chairs ===
- Bruce Cohen and Lady Gaga, appointed by President Joe Biden
- Margo Lion and George Stevens, Jr., appointed by President Barack Obama
- Adair Margo, appointed by President George W. Bush
- Dr. John Brademas, president emeritus of New York University appointed by President Bill Clinton
- Donald J. Hall, chairman of Hallmark Cards, Inc. appointed by President George H. W. Bush
- Andrew Heiskell, former chairman and CEO of Time, Inc. appointed by President Ronald Reagan

=== Executive directors ===
- Tsione Wolde-Michael
- Megan Beyer
- Rachel Goslins
- Daniel (Henry) Moran
- Bunny Burson
- Harriet Fulbright
- Ellen McCulloch-Lovell
- Diane Paton

== See also ==
- Strategic and Policy Forum (January–August 2017) – a board disbanded for similar reasons
- American Manufacturing Council (January–August 2017) – a board disbanded for similar reasons
