= Pat Gelsinger =

American businessman (born 1961)

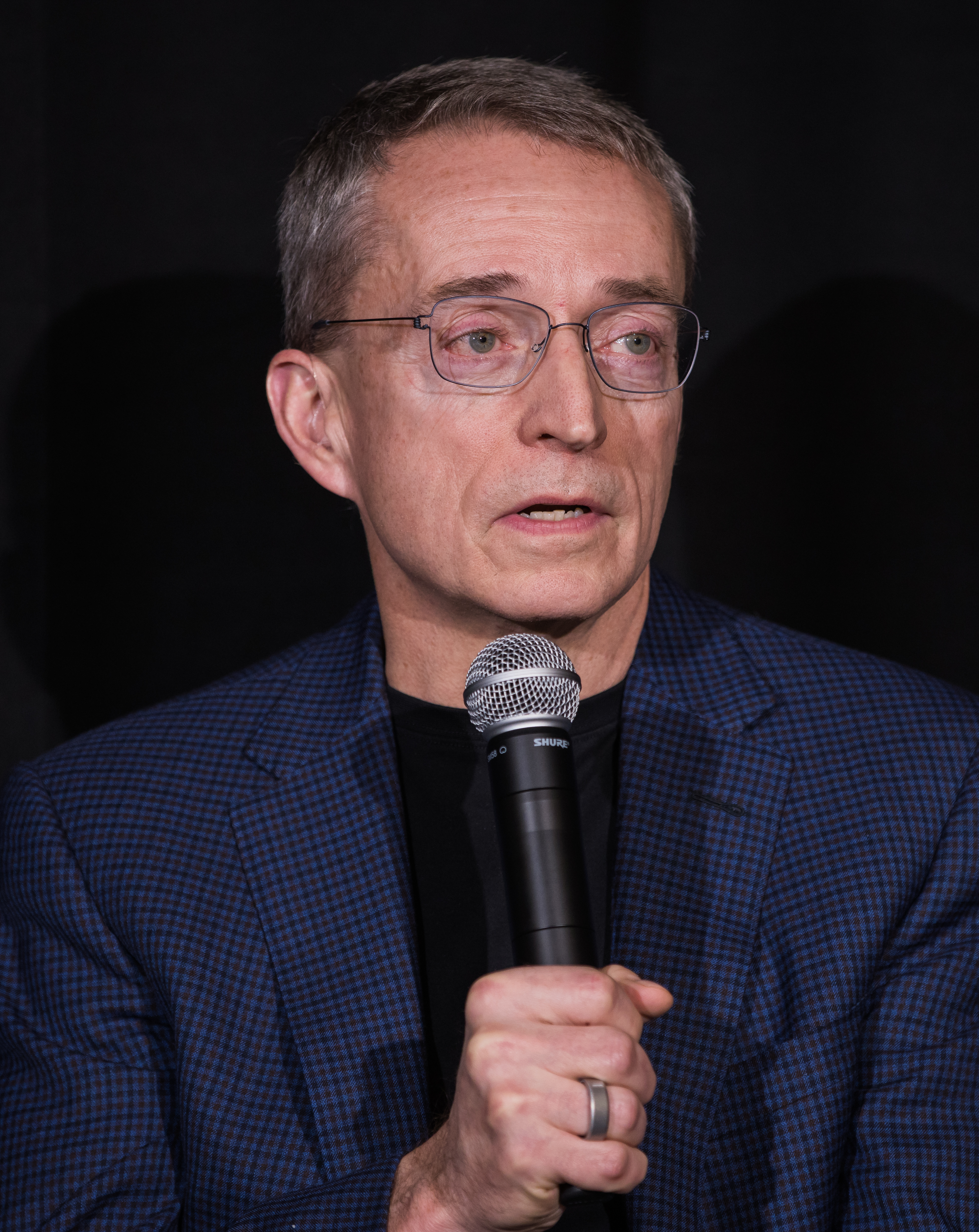
- Gelsinger in 2025
- Born: Patrick Paul Gelsinger; March 5, 1961 (age 65); Robesonia, Pennsylvania, U.S.
- Education: Santa Clara University (BS); Stanford University (MS)
- Years active: 1979–2024 (retired)
- Employer(s): Formerly EMC Corporation, Intel and VMware
- Known for: Chief architect of the i486
- Predecessor: Bob Swan
- Successor: Lip-Bu Tan
- Board member of: Semiconductor Industry Association (SIA)
- Spouse: Linda Fortune
- Children: 4
- Family: 8 grandchildren

Patrick Paul Gelsinger (/ˈɡɛlsɪŋɡər/; born March 5, 1961) is an American business executive and engineer. He was chief executive officer (CEO) of Intel from February 2021 to December 2024.

Based mainly in Silicon Valley since the late 1970s, Gelsinger graduated from Stanford University with a master's degree in engineering in 1985 and was the chief architect of Intel's i486 microprocessor in the 1980s. He was Intel's CTO from 2001 to 2009. He left the company in 2009, and was the CEO of VMware and president and chief operating officer (COO) at EMC, before returning to Intel as CEO in February 2021. In 2024, he stepped down as CEO and from the board of directors.

== Early life and education ==
Gelsinger was raised on family farms by his parents, June and Paul Gelsinger, in rural Robesonia, in an Amish and Mennonite part of Pennsylvania. As a teenager, he received a high score on a Lincoln Tech electronics technology test, winning an early-admission scholarship. He then skipped his final year at Conrad Weiser High School and left home at 16 for college. There he earned the remainder of high school credits for graduation and worked at WFMZ-TV Channel 69 as a technician, while obtaining an associate’s degree from Lincoln Tech in West Orange, New Jersey in 1979.

In 1979, at age 18, he moved to Silicon Valley to work at Intel as a quality-control technician. While at Intel, he earned a bachelor's degree in electrical engineering, graduating magna cum laude from Santa Clara University in 1983, and then earned a master's degree in electrical engineering and computer science from Stanford University in 1985.

== Career ==
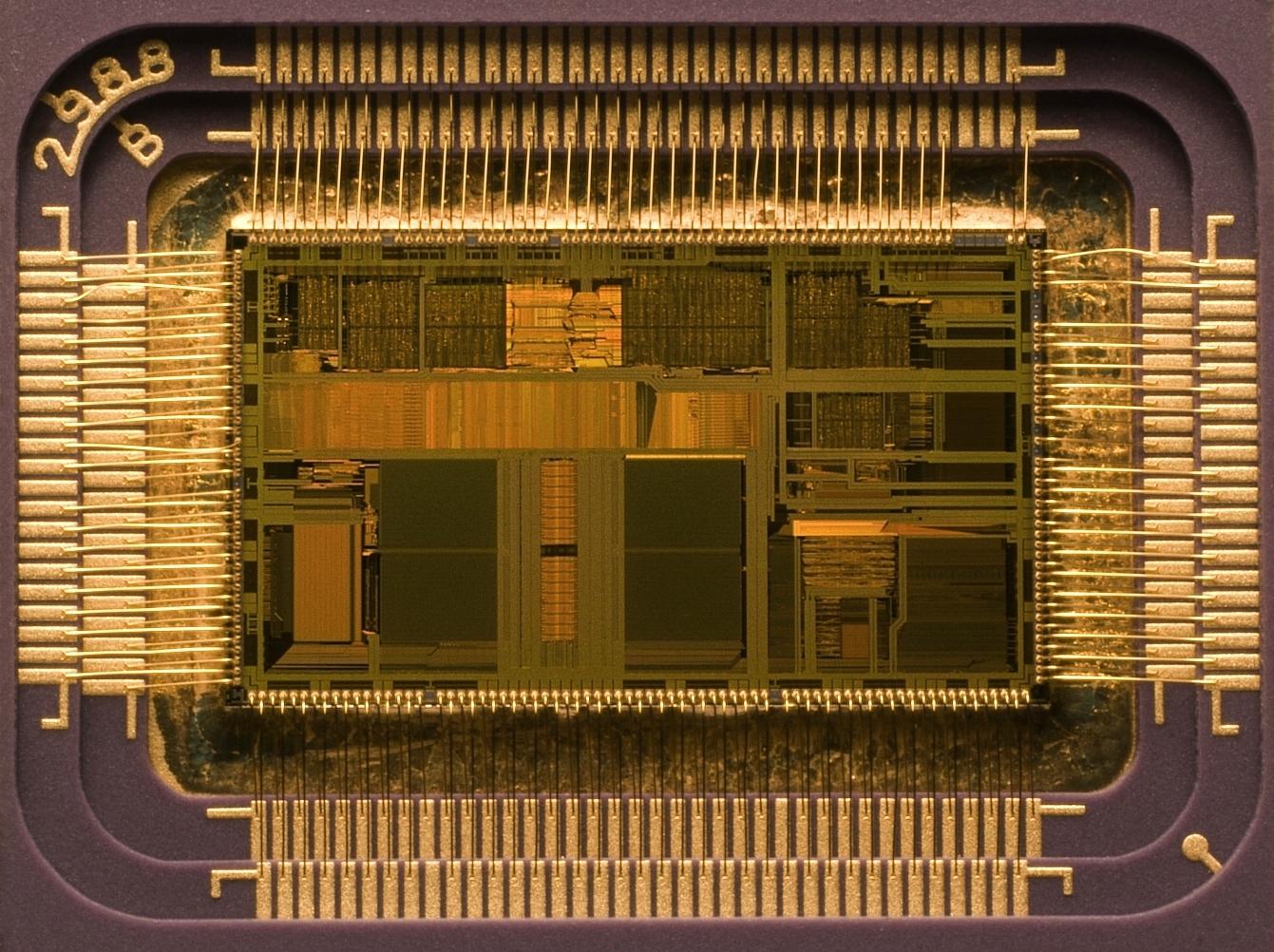
An Intel 486DX2 microprocessor using the 80486 architecture designed by Gelsinger in the 1980s

Gelsinger first joined Intel at 18 years old in 1979 just after earning an associate degree from Lincoln Tech. He spent much of his career with the company in Oregon, where he maintains a home. Gelsinger was part of the design team for the Intel 80386 microprocessor, leading the effort to port Unix to the processor. In 1987 he co-authored his first book, about programming the 80386. Gelsinger was the lead architect of the 4th generation 80486 processor introduced in 1989. At age 32, he was named the youngest vice president in Intel's history. Mentored by Intel CEO Andrew Grove, Gelsinger became the company's CTO in 2001, leading key technology developments, including Wi-Fi, USB, Intel Core and Intel Xeon processors, and 14 chip projects. He launched the Intel Developer Forum conference as a counterpart to Microsoft's WinHEC.

In September 2009, he left Intel to join EMC as president and chief operating officer. In 2012, he became the CEO of VMware.

Gelsinger rejoined Intel as their new CEO on February 15, 2021, after previously having a 30 year-long career at the company in various technical engineering and leadership roles. This followed reorganization pressure, due to languishing share prices, from its newest activist investor Third Point Management. Gelsinger led Intel's course correction, including construction of two $20 billion Arizona manufacturing plants (fabs) for its planned expansion. Media reported positive responses to Gelsinger's appointment and credited the decision for driving Intel share prices up nearly 8%. On March 23, 2021, Intel shares rose over 6% following Gelsinger’s remarks regarding company strategy, but during the next 3 years of Gelsinger's tenure Intel shares fell over 50%. In May 2021, Gelsinger was interviewed by Lesley Stahl of 60 Minutes. Gelsinger stated that Intel plans to catch up with Taiwanese chip manufacturer TSMC and Korean chip manufacturer Samsung within the next five years. He announced a planned three and a half-billion dollar upgrade to Intel's fab in New Mexico.

In March 2022, Gelsinger personally announced the start of an entirely new fab built for roughly $20 billion near Magdeburg, Saxony-Anhalt, Germany to employ 7,000 people during construction work and 3,000 people in production work in 2027.

On December 1, 2024, Gelsinger stepped down from the position of Intel CEO and from the company’s board of directors. CFO David Zinsner and executive Michelle Johnston Holthaus were named interim co-CEOs, while board member Frank Yeary assumed interim executive Chairship as the company conducts a search for a permanent new CEO. Holthaus has also been named to the newly-created CEO of Intel products, which will oversee, among other things, its data center and AI product efforts.

On March 24, 2025, Gelsinger was named as the executive chair and the head of technology of church-focused messaging platform Gloo, where he was a board member and investor, and which he calls a "faith ecosystem". On March 26, 2025, Gelsinger also announced he had become general partner at the venture capital firm Playground Global.

== Honors and appointments ==
He was named a Fellow of the Institute of Electrical and Electronics Engineers in 2008 and is a director of the Semiconductor Industry Association (SIA). He is a member of the National Security Telecommunications Advisory Committee (NSTAC).

Gelsinger holds eight design patents, developed for communications, computer architecture and VLSI design.

In 2021, Gelsinger was appointed to President Joe Biden's Council of Advisors on Science and Technology. In this position, he has advised Biden on the chips shortage and advocated for the passage of the CHIPS and Science Act. Gelsinger was a guest at Biden's State of the Union Address in March 2022. Biden has spoken in favor of Intel's investment in fabrication plants in the U.S. and has visited the $20 billion facility planned in Ohio alongside Gelsinger.

=== Honors ===
In October 2021, Gelsinger was inducted into Indiana Wesleyan University's Society of World Changers. While speaking on campus, he received an honorary doctor of science degree and a bronze bust of Gelsinger was placed in the university's library rotunda. In 2022, he was awarded an honorary Doctorate of Engineering from Ohio State University.

== Personal life ==
Gelsinger and his wife Linda are Christians; John Crawford cited Gelsinger as influencing him to become a Christian after their work on the 80386. The Gelsingers "support multiple worthy causes", including sponsorship of disaster relief medical teams. In 2013, Gelsinger co-founded Transforming the Bay with Christ (TBC), a coalition of business leaders, venture capitalists, non-profit leaders and pastors that aims to convert one million people over the next decade. He helped establish the Sacramento-area Christian institution William Jessup University, from which he also received an honorary doctorate. Gelsinger and his wife have four children.

== Bibliography ==
- Crawford, John H.; Gelsinger, Patrick P. (1987). Programming the 80386. San Francisco, CA: Sybex Inc. ISBN 978-0-89588-381-0. LCCN 87061199.
- Gelsinger, Pat (2003). Balancing Your Family, Faith & Work. Colorado Springs, CO: David C. Cook. ISBN 978-0781438995.
- Gelsinger, Pat (2008). The Juggling Act: Bringing Balance to Your Faith, Family, and Work. Colorado Springs, CO: David C. Cook. ISBN 978-1434768742.

Business positions
| Preceded by Paul Maritz | CEO, VMware; 2012–2021 | Succeeded by Raghu Raghuram |
| Preceded by Bob Swan | CEO, Intel; 2021–2024 | Succeeded by Lip-Bu Tan |
