= Strategic and Policy Forum =

U.S. presidential business forum

The President's Strategic and Policy Forum was a group operated from February to August 2017 by U.S. president Donald Trump, who sought perspectives from business leaders on how to create jobs and improve growth for the U.S. economy.

The 16-member board was initially led by Stephen A. Schwarzman, the co-founder of private equity firm the Blackstone Group. Its first meeting was in February 2017.

Several of its members resigned within months. In June, Elon Musk resigned to protest Trump's June withdrawal from the Paris Climate agreement. Others resigned in August to protest President Trump's statements regarding the 2017 Unite the Right rally in Charlottesville, Virginia. Resignations included Travis Kalanick, Bob Iger, Ken Frazier, Brian Krzanich, Kevin Plank, Schwarzman and Jamie Dimon.

On August 16, 2017, a dozen of the CEOs on the forum and the similar American Manufacturing Council decided on a conference call that they would withdraw and so dissolve the body. But before they could make their announcement, Trump announced via Twitter that he was disbanding it. He also disbanded the American Manufacturing Council.

"With the collapse of the councils, the president has all but lost his most natural constituency — the corporate leaders who stood to benefit from his agenda of lower taxes and lighter regulation," The New York Times wrote at the time.

== Members ==
Among those who belonged to the forum at one point or another were:

- Paul S. Atkins – CEO of Patomak Global Partners and former commissioner of the SEC
- Mary Barra – chairwoman and CEO of General Motors
- Toby Cosgrove – president and CEO of the Cleveland Clinic
- Kenneth C. Griffin – chairman, president, and CEO of Citadel LLC
- Jamie Dimon* – chairman, president, and CEO of JPMorgan Chase
- Larry Fink – chairman and CEO of BlackRock
- Kenneth Frazier* – chairman and CEO of Merck & Co.
- Bob Iger* – chairman and CEO of The Walt Disney Company
- Travis Kalanick* – chairman and CEO of Uber
- Brian Krzanich* – CEO of Intel
- Rich Lesser – president and CEO of the Boston Consulting Group
- Doug McMillon – president and CEO of Walmart Stores
- Jim McNerney – former president and CEO of Boeing
- Elon Musk* – president and CEO of Tesla Motors and SpaceX
- Indra Nooyi – chairwoman and CEO of PepsiCo
- Adebayo Ogunlesi – chairman and managing partner at Global Infrastructure Partners
- Kevin Plank* – chairman and CEO of Under Armour
- Ginni Rometty – chairwoman, president, and CEO of IBM
- Stephen Schwarzman* – co-founder, chairman, and CEO of The Blackstone Group
- Kevin Warsh – distinguished visiting fellow in economics at the Hoover Institute and former governor of the Federal Reserve
- Mark Weinberger – chairman and CEO of EY
- Jack Welch – former chairman and CEO of General Electric
- Daniel Yergin – Pulitzer Prize-winning author and vice chairman of IHS Markit

* Resigned before dissolution.

== See also ==
- American Manufacturing Council (January–August 2017) – a similar board also disbanded
