= Carlos M. Cardoso =

American businessman

- Born: Angola
- Education: Fairfield, B.S. Rensselaer, M.A.
- Years active: 2006-2014
- Employer: Kennametal (NYSE: KMT)
- Title: Chief Executive Officer

Carlos M. Cardoso (born in Angola) is an American businessman. He is the Principal of CMPC Advisors and the former Non-Executive Chairman of Garrett Advancing Motion. Cardoso was the Chairman, President and Chief Executive Officer of the Kennametal, a metalworking and tool production company headquartered in Latrobe, Pennsylvania.

== Early life and education ==
Cardoso was born to Portuguese parents in Luanda, Angola, while it was a Portuguese colony. During that time Cardoso attended schools in both Angola and Portugal. Due to his sports performances at the high school, the Liceu Nacional de Chaves in Portugal, he was recruited by one of U.S. Colleges. Receiving a scholarship, he moved to the United States to play NCAA Division l Soccer. Cardoso attended the Fairfield University where he played for the Fairfield Stags for four years. During his senior year, he was elected the Co-Captain of the team. He also worked part time at various manufacturing and distribution companies. Cardoso obtained his bachelor's degree in Business administration from Fairfield University and his Master of Science in executive management from Rensselaer Polytechnic Institute at Hartford. Cardoso also attended the Cornell University Executive Management Program.

== Career ==
Early in his career he owned and operated a machine shop. Then Cardoso served as the Vice President Manufacturing Operations for Colt Manufacturing Company in Hartford, Connecticut. In 1995 Cardoso joined AlliedSignal, where he spent over six years as Vice President and General Manager of Engine Systems and Accessories (ESA), Vice President and General Manager of Marketing Sales and Service, Aerospace Services, and Vice President Operations for Aerospace Equipment Systems.

Cardoso joined Flowserve in 2001 as a President of the Pump Division. Cardoso joined Kennametal from Flowserve in April 2003 as the President of the Metalworking Division and in January 2005 was promoted to Chief Operating Officer. In December 2005 Cardoso became a President and CEO of the Corporation and in 2008 took an additional role of Chairman of the Board of Directors. In 2015, Irving Place Capital appointed Cardoso as Senior Industrial Advisor.

== Appointments ==
In October 2007 Cardoso was appointed to the Stanley Works Board of Directors. In November 2011 Cardoso was appointed to the Pennsylvania Governor's Manufacturing Advisory Council. On May 31, 2012 Cardoso was nominated as the Chairman of the Board of Trustees of the Manufacturers Alliance for Productivity and Innovation (MAPI).

In February 2013 he was appointed to the Hubbell Board of Directors. Cardoso has served on the board of the Garrett Motion as a non executive chair person. Cardoso, on March 14, 2013 was elected by the United States Department of Commerce to sit on its the 30-member Manufacturing Council, formed to help shaping the direction of North Americas’ manufacturing strategy and supporting national businesses and workers. On October 18, 2013 Cardoso was elected to the Fairfield University Board of Trustees.

Cardoso served on the U.S. Manufacturing Council where he advised the U.S. Secretary of Commerce. He also served as chairman of the Manufacturers Alliance for Productivity and Innovation (MAPI)

Cardoso spent eleven years at Kennametal, the last eight of which he served as CEO. He was named one of America's “Best Chief Executive Officers” by Institutional Investor in 2007 and received an Ernst & Young Regional Entrepreneur Of The Year 2009 Award. Prior to Kennametal, Cardoso held executive roles at Flowserve and Honeywell (Allied Signal).

== Awards and recognition ==
- In 2007, Cardoso was named one of America's “Best Chief Executive Officers” by Institutional Investor.
- In June 2009, Cardoso was named Regional Entrepreneur of the Year by Ernst & Young.
- In December 2012, Cardoso received an Honorary Doctorate of Humane Letters from Saint Vincent College, Latrobe, PA.
- In April 2013, Cardoso received the Fairfield University Alumni Professional Achievement Award at the University's 26th Annual Fairfield Awards Dinner.
- In November 2014, Cardoso was inducted to IndustryWeek's 2014 Manufacturing Hall of Fame.
- In November 2014, Cardoso was honored as one of “The Pittsburgh Smart 50”, who helped to spark the region's business success and strength.
- In 2018, Cardoso was named to the 2018 National Association of Corporate Directors (NACD) Directorship 100.
