= Mapi =

Mapi or MAPI may refer to:

- Mapi León (born 1995), Spanish footballer
- MAPI (Messaging Application Programming Interface), an email API for Microsoft Windows
- Mappi River, a river in South Papua, Indonesia
- Manufacturers Alliance for Productivity and Innovation, a business non-profit organization
- MAPI (Israel), the Survey of Israel
