= Brian Krzanich =

American engineer and businessman (born 1960)

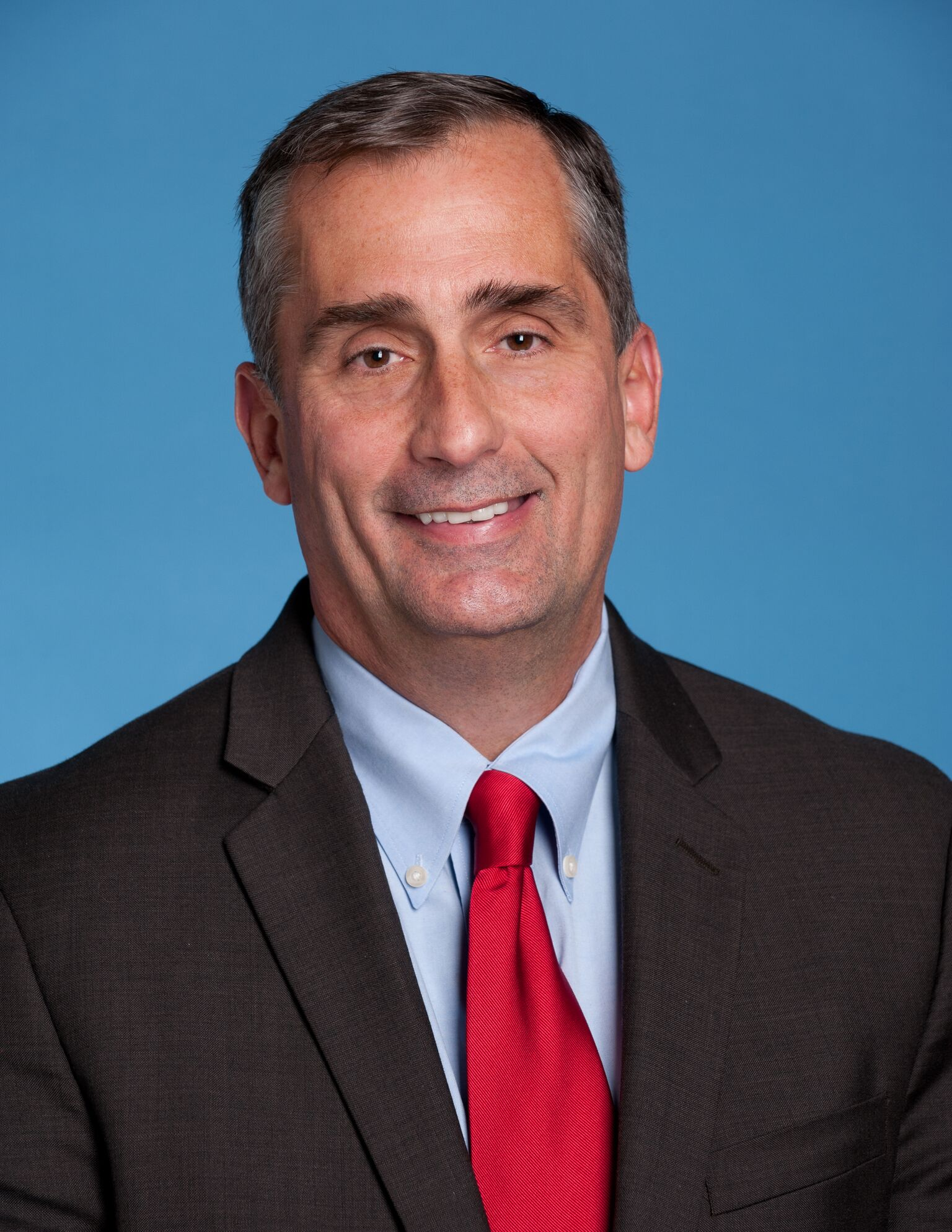
- Krzanich in 2014
- Born: Brian Matthew Krzanich; May 9, 1960 (age 66); Santa Clara County, California, U.S.
- Education: San Jose State University (BS)
- Known for: Former CEO of Intel
- Predecessor: Paul Otellini
- Successor: Bob Swan
- Board member of: Deere & Co.; Drone Advisory Committee; Lilliputian
- Spouse: Brandee Krzanich (m. 1998)
- Children: 3 daughters

Brian Matthew Krzanich (born May 9, 1960) is an American engineer who was CEO of Intel from May 2013 to June 2018. Krzanich joined Intel as an engineer in 1982 and was chief operating officer (COO) before being promoted to CEO in May 2013. During Krzanich's term as CEO, Intel went through major restructurings and pulled out of the mobile chip market. Because of Krzanich's decisions, Intel also struggled to produce 10-nanometer chips, compared to chip manufacturers TSMC and Samsung, resulting in numerous delays and a loss of market share in the computer chip business to rivals like AMD.

Krzanich has been on the Deere & Co. and Semiconductor Industry Association boards, as well as the Drone Advisory Committee, which advises the Federal Aviation Administration. He resigned from Intel in June 2018 after a past consensual relationship with a subordinate against company policy was disclosed.

Krzanich was appointed as CEO of automotive startup Cerence in October 2024.

== Early life and education ==
Krzanich is from Santa Clara County, California. He graduated from San Jose State University in 1982 with a bachelor's degree in chemistry.

== Career ==
=== Intel ===
Krzanich began working as a process engineer at Intel's chip factory in New Mexico in 1982. He became manager of a fabrication plant in Chandler, Arizona, in 1996, and later supervised assembly and testing facilities. He held management roles within Intel's manufacturing division, managed a plant in Massachusetts, and began overseeing the company's factories and supply chains in 2007. Intel removed conflict minerals from its microprocessors while Krzanich was in charge of the company's supply chain. He cited moral obligation as the reason to take action, and said the issue was "very important and personal" to him. Intel worked to use conflict-free minerals for all microprocessors by 2014 and all products by 2016, and Krzanich was included in the documentary film Merci Congo (2016).

In January 2012, Krzanich was promoted to the role of chief operating officer. He led Intel's China strategy in this role.

Krzanich was chief executive officer (CEO) of Intel starting in May 2013. In this role, Krzanich has been credited for expanding Intel's offerings beyond central processing units (CPUs) and into other technologies, including 5G wireless networks, artificial intelligence, autonomous vehicles, cloud computing, drones, and wearables. Intel has also explored artificial, augmented, and virtual reality, as well as machine learning, during his tenure.

In January 2015, he announced Intel's $300 million Diversity in Technology initiative to support the company's goal to achieve full representation of women and underrepresented minorities in Intel's U.S. workforce by 2020, and accelerate diversity and inclusion across the technology industry at large. These activities include funding engineering scholarships at historically black colleges and universities, establishing a professional gaming women's team, and sponsoring female students to attend game developer conferences in partnership with the International Game Developers Association. In addition to Intel's Diversity in Technology initiative, the company's Hack Harassment campaign has worked to address cyberbullying with Krzanich as CEO.

In January 2017, Krzanich spoke out against Executive Order 13769, U.S. President Donald Trump's executive order banning entry into the country by residents of seven predominantly Muslim nations. In February, he stood alongside Trump at the White House to announce a $7 billion investment in a new factory in Chandler. However, the factory was not built. The announcement was made one day after Intel and other companies told a court that they believed Trump's immigration order was unconstitutional. Krzanich also expressed support for the president's regulatory and tax policies on behalf of Intel. Krzanich supported transgender rights before and after Trump announced the reinstatement of the ban on military service by transgender individuals in July.

In August, Krzanich became the third executive to leave the Trump administration's American Manufacturing Council in 24 hours (following Kenneth Frazier and Kevin Plank, the CEOs of Merck & Co. and Under Armour, respectively), based on the president's response to the Unite the Right rally. In a blog post confirming his resignation, Krzanich said "promoting American manufacturing 'should not be a political issue'". He and other CEOs in the technology industry called for legal protections for "Dreamers", or immigrants who arrived in the U.S. as children, after the Trump administration rescinded the immigration policy known as Deferred Action for Childhood Arrivals (DACA) in September 2017.

Krzanich's involvement in politics and Intel's diversity initiatives required the company to increase personal security funding for Krzanich and other colleagues because of received threats. He has made personal political contributions through Intel's political action committee.

In November 2017, Krzanich exercised stock options and sold shares in Intel worth $24 million after the company had learned that all its chips sold in the last decade had a major and fundamental security vulnerability. When the news became public in January 2018, the timing of the sale was questioned. Krzanich retained 250,000 shares, the minimum amount allowed under his employment agreement and approximately half of the 495,000 shares he held prior to the transaction.

By June 2018, an investigation launched against Krzanich after an employee at Intel reported a tip of him having engaged in a consensual relationship with a subordinate. According to various news outlets, the extramarital affair began before the enactment of the anti-fraternization policy and ended several years before the investigation and his subsequent resignation. On June 21, Krzanich was ousted as the CEO of Intel.

=== CDK Global ===
On November 7, 2018, Krzanich was announced to be the new chief executive officer and president of CDK Global, replacing former CEO Brian MacDonald. In July of 2022, Krzanich stepped down from the position and Brian P. MacDonald was appointed acting President and Chief Executive Officer.

== Personal life ==
Krzanich has been married to Brandee Krzanich since 1998. They have two daughters, with whom he has attended hackathons. Krzanich resides in Atherton, California.

=== Political activity ===
In June 2016, Krzanich canceled an event at his home that was reported by The New York Times to be a fundraiser in support of then-nominee Donald Trump. According to Intel, the event was intended to be "a full exchange of views," but it was widely seen as incongruous with Intel's support for immigration reform and its US$300 million effort to attract women and minorities, as well as detrimental to the company's interests in China, the biggest market for the semiconductor industry. Krzanich later said he would not endorse a candidate in the 2016 United States presidential election.

Business positions
Preceded by Paul Otellini	CEO, Intel; 2013–2018	Succeeded by Bob Swan
