= American Manufacturing Council =

Group of chief executives advising U.S. President Donald Trump

Manufacturing Jobs Initiative
- Predecessor: President's Council on Jobs and Competitiveness
- Formation: January 27, 2017
- Founded at: Washington, D.C.
- Dissolved: August 16, 2017 (201 days)
- Parent organization: Department of Commerce

The American Manufacturing Council was a group of prominent chief executives set up to advise U.S. president Donald Trump on domestic manufacturing initiatives. It was chaired by Andrew Liveris, CEO of Dow Chemical Company.

Following the withdrawal of several members after Trump's defense of alt-right protestors at the Unite the Right rally, Trump on August 16, 2017, disbanded the council, as well as the Strategic and Policy Forum. The council itself had earlier informed the president that they intended to disband on their own initiative.

== Members ==
Resigned Members until disbandment Resigned after Trump statements regarding events in Charlottesville

Former Members of the American Manufacturing Council
Name	Title	Entity	Membership Status
William M. Brown	CEO	Harris Corporation	member until disbandment
Michael Dell	CEO	Dell Technologies Inc	member until disbandment
John J. Ferriola	CEO	Nucor	member until disbandment
Jeff Fettig	CEO	Whirlpool Corporation	member until disbandment
Mark Fields	CEO (former)	Ford Motor Company	resigned in May after leaving Ford
Kenneth Frazier	CEO	Merck & Co.	resigned August 14 after Trump statements regarding events in Charlottesville
Alex Gorsky	CEO	Johnson & Johnson	resigned August 16 after Trump statements regarding events in Charlottesville
Gregory J. Hayes	CEO	United Technologies	resigned August 16 after Trump statements regarding events in Charlottesville
Marillyn Hewson	CEO	Lockheed Martin	member until disbandment
Jeff Immelt	Chairman	General Electric	resigned August 16 after Trump statements regarding events in Charlottesville
Jim Kamsickas	CEO	Dana Inc	member until disbandment
Klaus Kleinfeld	CEO (former)	Arconic	resigned in April after leaving Arconic
Brian Krzanich	CEO	Intel	resigned August 14 after Trump statements regarding events in Charlottesville
Richard G. Kyle	CEO	Timken Company	member until disbandment
Thea Lee	Deputy Chief of Staff	AFL–CIO	resigned August 15 after Trump statements regarding events in Charlottesville
Andrew Liveris	CEO	Dow Chemical Company	member until disbandment
Mario Longhi	CEO (former)	U.S. Steel	resigned in June after retiring from U.S. Steel
Denise Morrison	CEO	Campbell's	resigned August 16 after Trump statements regarding events in Charlottesville
Dennis Muilenburg	CEO	Boeing	member until disbandment
Elon Musk	CEO	Tesla	resigned in June over U.S. withdrawal from Paris climate accord
Doug Oberhelman	Executive Chairman	Caterpillar Inc.	member until disbandment
Scott Paul	President	Alliance for American Manufacturing	resigned August 15 after Trump statements regarding events in Charlottesville
Kevin Plank	CEO	Under Armour	resigned August 14 after Trump statements regarding events in Charlottesville
Michael B. Polk	CEO	Newell Brands	member until disbandment
Mark Sutton	CEO	International Paper	member until disbandment
Inge Thulin	CEO	3M	resigned August 16 after Trump statements regarding events in Charlottesville
Richard Trumka	President	AFL–CIO	resigned August 15 after Trump statements regarding events in Charlottesville
Wendell Weeks	CEO	Corning Inc.	member until disbandment

== Resignations and disbandment ==
=== Paris Agreement ===
In June 2017, Elon Musk announced his resignation from the council. He stated departure from the council was a direct response to the United States' withdrawal from the Paris Agreement.

=== Unite the Right Rally In Charlottesville, Virginia ===
Seven executives resigned from the council in response to Trump's response to the violence at the Unite the Right rally in Charlottesville, Virginia on August 12, 2017. The first executives to resign were drugmaker Merck & Co. CEO Kenneth Frazier, Under Armour CEO Kevin Plank, and Intel CEO Brian Krzanich. On August 15, 2017, Scott Paul, president of the Alliance for American Manufacturing, also resigned. The same day, Richard Trumka and Thea Lee resigned, stating that "We cannot sit on a council for a President who tolerates bigotry and domestic terrorism."

=== Disbandment ===
Following the withdrawal of the members, Stephen A. Schwarzman and the remaining members decided to disband the Council during a conference call on August 16, 2017. Schwarzman called Trump the same day to announce that they had decided to disband the Council. Trump tweeted shortly after that saying that he and the group had agreed to disband the Council, as well as the Strategic and Policy Forum.

== See also ==
- President's Council on Jobs and Competitiveness (2011–2013) – an earlier similar board
- Strategic and Policy Forum (January–August 2017) – another board also disbanded
