= Russ Ramsey =

American financier and philanthropist

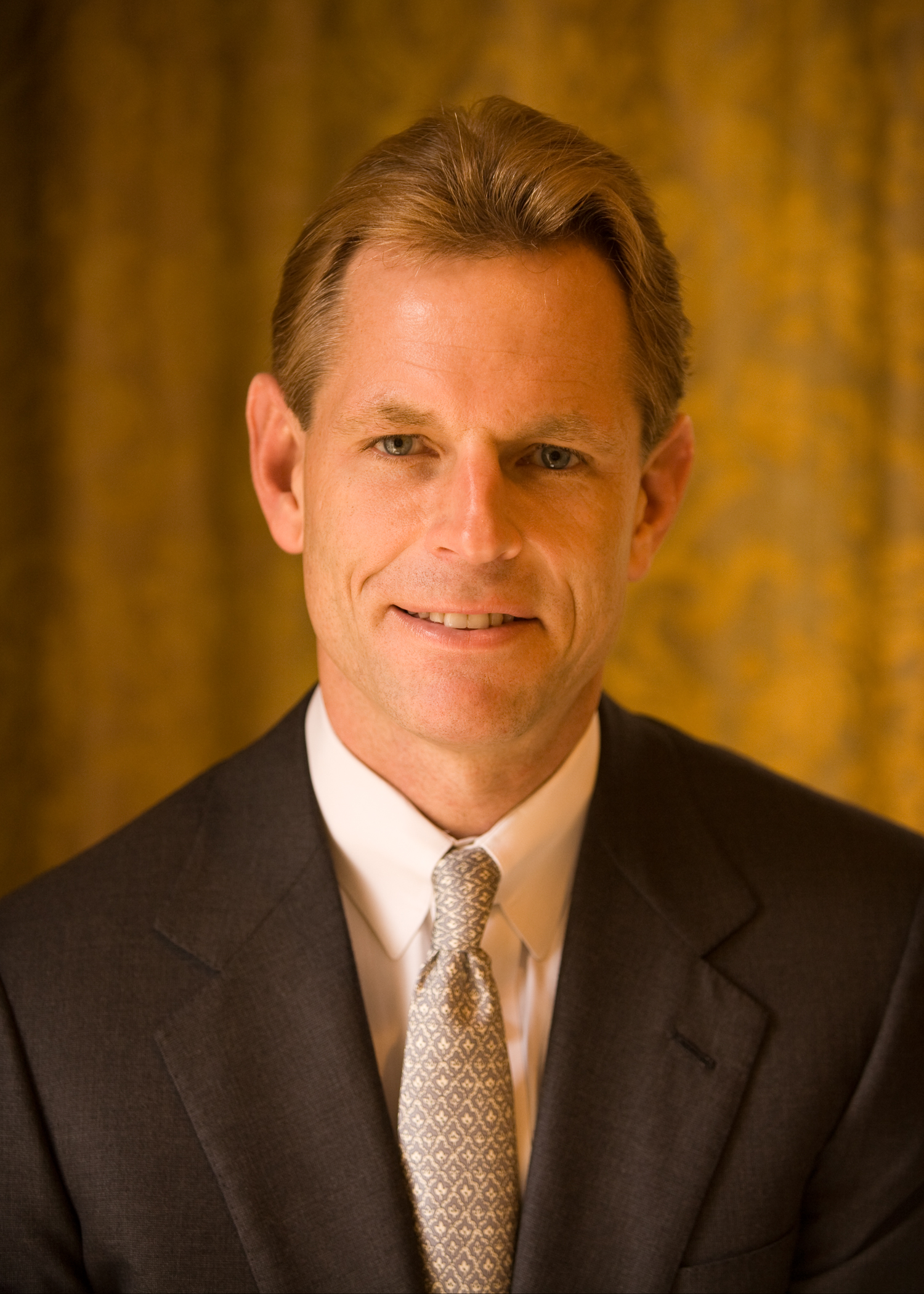
- Education: George Washington University (BA)

W. Russell "Russ" Ramsey is an American financier and philanthropist, and the founder, chairman and CEO of asset management firm Ramsey Asset Management. He cofounded the Washington, D.C., investment firm Friedman, Billings, Ramsey Group in 1989, where he served as president, secretary and co-CEO through 2001. He also served as JV partner and a member of the Board of Directors until his retirement in 2007. He is also a founding investor in the non-profit investment organization Venture Philanthropy Partners.

In 2014, Ramsey led an attempt to bring the 2024 Summer Olympics to his native Washington, D.C., serving as chairman and CEO of Washington 2024.

In 2016, Ramsey announced the formation of the Greater Washington Partnership, an entity consisting of CEOs and regional business leaders in the Capital Region from Baltimore to Richmond, to focus on large economic and social/community opportunities led by the business community.

== Early life and education ==
Russ Ramsey grew up in Washington, D.C. He graduated from Suitland High School in 1977. As a member of George Washington University's Class of 1981, he studied business administration and graduated with a bachelor's degree. Ramsey received a baseball scholarship and became senior-year team captain and MVP of the George Washington Colonials. He is a GW Athletic Hall of Famer and member of the All-Century Baseball Team.

== Career ==
Ramsey began working in the early 1980s as a salesman for business equipment company Pitney Bowes. Following his time there, he joined brokerage firm Johnston, Lemon & Co.'s sales and trading group in 1986, and became a vice president of the company. At Johnston, Lemon, he met Emmanuel Joseph Friedman and Eric Francis Billings, who would later become his business partners. In 1989, all three left the firm and formed a new venture called Friedman, Billings, Ramsey Group (FBR), where Ramsey served as president and co-CEO.

In 1997, the firm held its initial public offering, raising $206 million. The same year, the Northern Virginia Technology Council named Ramsey its "Financier of the Year".

Within its first seven years, FBR raised $7 billion in capital for clients and had become the largest trading and investment banking firm in Washington, D.C. The firm invested in emerging tech companies. After the IPO, Friedman, Billings, Ramsey Group's stock price increased 50 percent.

In 2001, Ramsey left FBR to form the hedge fund management firm Ramsey Asset Management, based in Reston, Virginia.

Newsweek magazine named Ramsey as one of its four "people to see" in Washington's finance community.

In 2016, Ramsey co-founded the Greater Washington Partnership (GWP) along with Ted Leonsis and Peter Scher. As of November 2019, Ramsey serves as Board of Chair of Greater Washington Partnership. The Greater Washington Partnership and its Capital Collaborative of Leaders in Academia and Business (CoLAB) is a non-profit alliance of CEOs and business leaders in the Baltimore, Washington D.C., and Richmond area, otherwise known as the Capital Region.

The GWP was formed as an initiative to boost the region's economy by addressing issues of transportation, human capital, innovation, and entrepreneurship through collaboration among the area's largest employers. With the launch of the Capital CoLAB in June 2018, the Partnership expanded to include leaders from academic institutions in order to focus on talent and innovation initiatives.

In 2021, Ramsey was inducted into the Washington Business Hall of Fame by Junior Achievement of Greater Washington.

== Other activities and philanthropy ==
Ramsey served on the Board of Trustees of his alma mater George Washington University for 15 years from 1998 to 2013. He chaired the board during his last six years as trustee. During his tenure on the board, Ramsey chaired the committee that lead to Steven Knapp's hiring as the 16th president of George Washington University. He also oversaw a 20-year plan to develop the university's campus site at Foggy Bottom and its strategic plan development. Additionally, in 2005, the Ramsey family donated $1 million to the university to create an investment portfolio to be run by Master of Business Administration students, so that they could build real world finance expertise. In 2013, he was elected Chairman Emeritus of GWU Board of Trustees and was awarded the honorary degree of Doctor of Public Service in May 2014.

Ramsey has served on a number of boards and councils, including JER Investors Trust's board, the National Geographic Society's Council of Advisors, the Virginia Governor's Advisory Council, the Council on Foreign Relations and the Virginia Foundation for Independent Colleges board, the Washington-Baltimore chapter of the World's President Organization, the D.C. College Access Program Board of Directors, the Virginia Tech Innovation Campus Advisory Council, and the Advisory Board for Vice President Joe Biden's Cancer Moonshot 2020 initiative.

Together with his wife, Norma, Ramsey established the W. Russell and Norma G. Ramsey Foundation, which provides funds to help at-risk families. The foundation has funded scholarships to the D.C. area's Big Brothers Big Sisters program. Additionally, he and his wife were early investors in Venture Philanthropy Partners, which invests in D.C.-area nonprofits. Ramsey has also made individual contributions to events and causes including Fight for Children's annual Fight Night fundraiser, Make A Wish Foundation, Potomac School, and Inova Fairfax Hospital System.

=== Washington 2024 ===
In 2013, Washington, D.C., businessman Ted Leonsis, owner of the Washington Capitals and Washington Wizards, recruited Ramsey for an effort to bring the 2024 Summer Olympics to the city. Ramsey was selected in March 2014 as chairman and CEO of the nonprofit Washington 2024, founded to run the city's effort to host the games. Washington 2024 also included former NFL Commissioner Paul Tagliabue and former Mayor Anthony Williams. The group publicly announced its board, logo, website and theme, "Unity", six months later. On behalf of the organization, Ramsey and Leonsis, its vice chairman, lobbied for support around the Capital Beltway.

Ramsey and the others on the Washington 2024 panel competed against committees in Boston, Los Angeles, and San Francisco to be the first U.S. city to host the Summer Olympics since the 1996 Summer Games in Atlanta. During the campaign, Ramsey proposed development along the Anacostia River, which includes some of D.C.'s poorer communities, a move similar to how officials in London sought use the 2012 Summer Olympics to economically boost East London. Ramsey led a five-person group to pitch Washington, D.C., to the 16-member U.S. Olympic Committee in December 2014. On January 8, 2015, the committee selected to submit Boston to the International Olympic Committee as America's candidate for the games. Following the announcement, Ramsey released a statement that he would continue working with leaders in the D.C. area to develop opportunities for young people in sport.

== Personal life ==
Ramsey lives with his wife, Norma, who directs the Ramsey Foundation, in Great Falls, Virginia. The couple has four children.
