= Bob Swan =

American business executive

- Born: Robert Holmes Swan; 1959 or 1960 (age 66–67); Syracuse, New York, U.S.
- Education: University at Buffalo (BA); Binghamton University (MBA)
- Occupation: CFO of Ebay 2006-2015 CEO of Intel 2019-2021
- Predecessor: Brian Krzanich
- Successor: Pat Gelsinger
- Children: 2

Robert Holmes Swan is an American business executive. He was CEO of Intel from January 2019 until February 15, 2021. He joined Intel as CFO in October 2016 from General Atlantic, after spending years as CFO at eBay, Electronic Data Systems, and TRW Inc. Following the resignation of Brian Krzanich as Intel CEO, he was named interim CEO on June 21, 2018, and appointed to full-time CEO on January 31, 2019. As of February 15, 2021, Swan was replaced by VMware CEO Pat Gelsinger. In July 2021, Silicon Valley venture capital firm Andreessen Horowitz announced that Swan will be joining the firm.

== Early life and education ==
Bob Swan was born in Syracuse, New York. He graduated from Corcoran High School in 1978. He received a bachelor's degree in business administration from the University at Buffalo School of Management in 1983 and his M.B.A. from Binghamton University in 1985.

== Career ==
=== General Electric and Electronic Data Systems ===
Swan worked at General Electric starting in 1985 after receiving his MBA, holding various senior finance roles during his 15-year tenure. He was at Electronic Data Systems as CFO. From 1988 until 1994 he was involved with GE's corporate audit staff, and afterwards he became the CFO of GE Transportation Systems. From 1997 until 1998, he was the vice president of Finance for GE Medical Systems in Europe. From 1998 until 1999, he was vice president of finance and CFO of GE Lighting.

He joined Webvan in 1999 as a vice president of finance. From 2000 until 2001 he was the company's COO and CFO. In 2001 he became CEO after the resignation of George Shaheen four months before the company went under. After Webvan, he joined TRW as CFO, as vice president of TRW Automotive Holdings. He was with TRW from July 2001 until December 2002.

In 2001, he became CFO of Northrop Grumman Space & Mission Systems Corporation. He was also CFO of Electronic Data Systems Corporation. From 2003 until 2006, he was CFO of HP Enterprise Services.

=== eBay and General Atlantic ===
Swan was appointed eBay CFO in February 2006. He was CFO at eBay from March 2006 until July 2015. In 2015 he "oversaw" the spinoff of PayPal Holdings.

In 2013, the Silicon Valley Business Journal named him CFO of the Year. In 2014, he won a Lifetime Achievement Award at the Bay Area CFO of the Year Awards. That year, Institutional Investor named him to its America's Best CFOs list.

In 2015, he became an operating partner at the growth equity firm General Atlantic LLC. He was an operating partner at General Atlantic from September 2015 until September 2016.

=== Intel ===
In September 2016, Swan was named the new CFO of Intel, replacing Stacy Smith, and joining from General Atlantic. He officially joined Intel on October 10, 2016, as executive vice president and first outside CFO that Intel had recruited since 1983.

He was named interim CEO on June 21, 2018 following the resignation of Brian Krzanich. Swan had oversight at that point for sales, manufacturing, and operations. In September 2018, he addressed supply concerns with an open letter. Bob Swan remained Intel's interim CEO and CFO until January 31, 2019, when he was appointed permanent CEO. He had reportedly told employees he was not pursuing a permanent CEO position.

In December 2018, it was reported that he was the only Intel insider buying stock since 2010. He was also the only eBay insider to buy stock in years.

On January 13, 2021, Intel announced Bob Swan would step down as CEO and be replaced by VMware CEO Pat Gelsinger. Intel stock rose over 7% after this announcement.

=== Andreessen Horowitz ===
In July 2021, Swan joined the Silicon Valley venture capital firm Andreessen Horowitz.

== Organizations ==
In April 2001, Swan became a director at Webvan group, and he was a director at PayPal Holdings until July 17, 2015. In June 2011, he was a director at Radial.

He joined eBay's board in 2015 and in 2016 he was on the boards of eBay, Applied Materials, App Dynamics, and Alignment Healthcare. He was on the board of AppDynamics until October 2016 and Applied Materials until September 2016. He remains on the board of Alignment Healthcare. He is also a director of Skype Global, and has been since December 2009.

== Personal life ==
Bob Swan lives in the San Francisco Bay Area, California. He is married and has two children.

== See also ==
- List of chief executive officers

Business positions
| Preceded by Brian Krzanich | CEO, Intel; 2019–2021 (2018–2019, interim) | Succeeded by Pat Gelsinger |
