= Zibby Owens =

American writer & podcaster (born 1976)

- Born: Elizabeth Schwarzman; 1976 (age 49–50); New York City, U.S.
- Education: Yale University; Harvard University
- Occupations: Podcaster; writer
- Spouses: Andrew Right (m. 2005–2016) Kyle Owens (m. 2017)
- Children: 4
- Father: Stephen A. Schwarzman
- Relatives: Teddy Schwarzman (brother)
- Website: zibbyowens.com

Elizabeth "Zibby" Owens (née Schwarzman) is an American writer and podcast host, known for her podcast Moms Don’t Have Time to Read Books. She is based in New York City.

== Life and career ==
Zibby Owens was born Elizabeth Schwarzman, the daughter of Stephen A. Schwarzman, co-founder, chairman, and CEO of The Blackstone Group, and Ellen Katz, a trustee of Northwestern University and the Mount Sinai Medical Center.

Born in New York City, she grew up on the Upper East Side of Manhattan and attended Yale University and Harvard Business School.

In 2018, Owens launched the Moms Don’t Have Time to Read Books podcast, where she interviews authors. By the end of 2019, the podcast had produced 200 episodes with a cumulative download count of 250,000.

In 2020, Owens expanded her literary endeavours by interviewing authors on Instagram and launching an online literary magazine titled We Found Time, which featured essays from authors who had appeared on her podcast. In February 2021, she released a book titled Moms Don't Have Time To: A Quarantine Anthology, based on these essays.

Owens also serves on the advisory council of the New York Public Library.

== Activism ==
Following the October 7 attacks, Owens assembled a 75-writer anthology called On Being Jewish Now: Reflections from Authors and Advocates with the group Artists Against Antisemitism.

In November 2023, Owens withdrew her company's sponsorship of the 2023 National Book Award due to concerns that a potential call for a ceasefire in the Gaza war conflict by participating authors could be perceived as discriminatory against Israel and the Jewish community.

== Publications ==
- What to Wear to Show Off Your Assets. What to Do to Tone Up Your Trouble Spots, (as Zibby Right), co-authored with Paige Adams-Geller, and Ashley Borden; McGraw-Hill (January 2008)
- Moms Don't Have Time To: A Quarantine Anthology (2021)
- Moms Don't Have Time To Have Kids: A Timeless Anthology (2021)
- Bookends: A Memoir of Love, Loss and Literature (2022)
- Princess Charming (2022)
- Blank: A Novel (2024)
- On Being Jewish Now: Reflections from Authors and Advocates (2024)

== Personal life ==
Owens is married to Kyle Owens, a former professional tennis player and film producer. Her first marriage to Andrew Right, with whom she has four children, ended in divorce.
