= John Crawford (engineer) =

American computer engineer

John H. Crawford
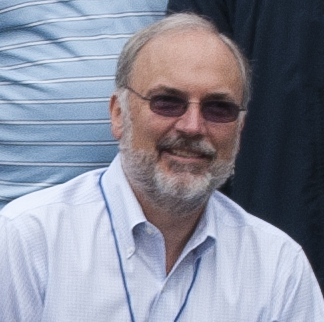
- John Crawford in 2011
- Education: Brown University (B.A.); University of North Carolina (M.S.)
- Known for: Intel microprocessors (8086, 386, 486, Pentium, Itanium family)
- Awards: Eckert–Mauchly Award (1995); IEEE Ernst Weber Engineering Leadership Recognition (1997); National Academy of Engineering Member (2002); Computer History Museum Fellow (2014)
- Scientific career
- Fields: Computer science Electrical engineering
- Workplaces: Intel

John H. Crawford (born February 2, 1953) is an American computer engineer.

== Career ==
During a long career at Intel starting in 1977, he was the chief architect of the Intel 80386 and Intel 80486 microprocessors. He was named an Intel Fellow, the company's highest ranking technical position. He also co-managed the design of the Intel P5 Pentium microprocessor family, and led the HP-Intel team that developed the Itanium architecture. Crawford was the recipient of the 1995 Eckert–Mauchly Award. He was awarded the IEEE Ernst Weber Engineering Leadership Recognition in 1997.

Crawford was elected a member of the National Academy of Engineering in 2002 for the architectural design of widely used microprocessors.

He retired from Intel in 2013.

In 2014, he was made a fellow of the Computer History Museum for his work on industry-standard microprocessor architectures.

== Bibliography ==
- Crawford, John H.; Gelsinger, Patrick P. (1987). Programming the 80386. Sybex Inc. ISBN 0-89588-381-3. LCCN 87061199.
