= Teddy Schwarzman =

American film producer and former lawyer (born 1979)

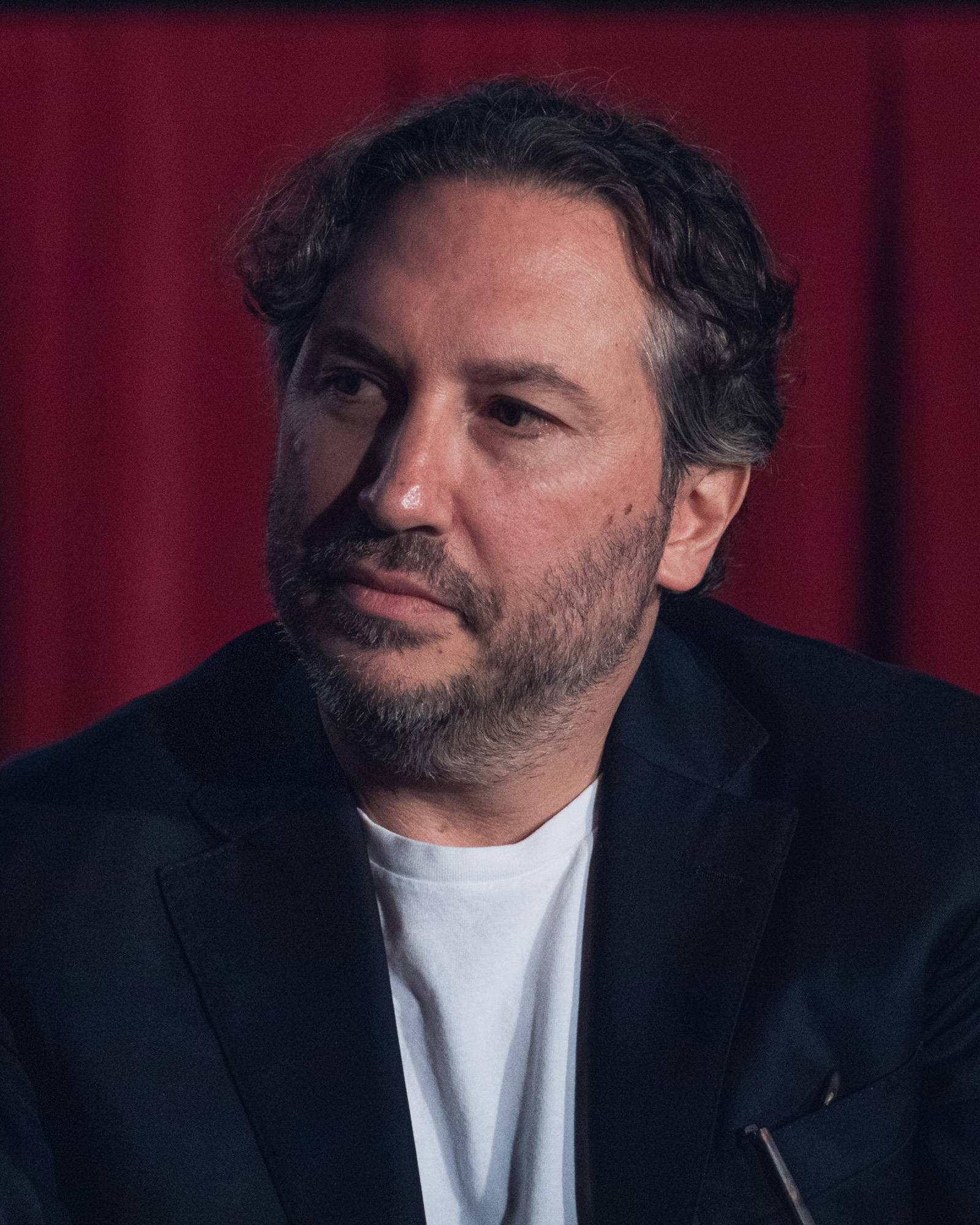
- Schwarzman in 2025
- Born: Edward Frank Schwarzman; May 29, 1979 (age 47); New York City, U.S.
- Education: University of Pennsylvania (BA); Duke University (JD)
- Occupation: Film producer
- Known for: Founder of Black Bear Pictures
- Spouse: Ellen Marie Zajac (m. 2007)
- Children: 3
- Parent(s): Stephen A. Schwarzman; Ellen Philips Katz
- Relatives: Zibby Owens (sister)

Edward "Teddy" Schwarzman (born May 29, 1979) is an American film producer, studio executive and media entrepreneur. He is the founder and CEO of Black Bear Pictures, whose productions include Train Dreams and The Imitation Game, for which he received Academy Award nominations for Best Picture.

== Early life and education ==
Teddy Schwarzman was born in 1979 in New York City, to Stephen A. Schwarzman, a co-founder, chairman, and CEO of The Blackstone Group, and Ellen Katz (née Philips), a trustee of Northwestern University and the Mount Sinai Medical Center. His sister is a writer and podcaster, Zibby Owens. His family is Jewish. He graduated from Trinity School before attending the University of Pennsylvania for college. He then studied at Duke University School of Law, graduating with distinction.

== Career ==
Out of law school, Schwarzman worked as a corporate lawyer at Skadden, a New York-based firm, where he specialized in real estate and corporate restructuring. He left Skadden to work in the film industry, initially working for John Sloss's film advisory company, Cinetic Media, where he focused on film packaging and finance. Schwarzman worked with producers and filmmakers to source project financing, including, among other titles, Richard Linklater's 2011 film Bernie and consulted for UHNW clients, sovereign funds, and established and emerging film financiers.

Schwarzman left Cinetic in 2011 to found his own production company, Black Bear Pictures, of which he is the CEO. Now one of the leading independent studios, Black Bear has operations and/or direct investments spanning the United States, Canada and the United Kingdom. Schwarzman has been a driving force behind Black Bear's production of over 50 films, and Black Bear's distribution of close to 800 titles around the world.

Schwarzman earned Academy Award nominations for Best Picture for Train Dreams and The Imitation Game, with other credits including Wicker, Sing Sing, Tuner, Nyad, Mudbound, All Is Lost, Dumb Money, Longlegs, Immaculate, and many more. As a distributor, Black Bear's global releasing arms have been behind the releases of such films as Wicker, Conclave, The Brutalist, Anora, The Invite and the Paw Patrol franchise.

Schwarzman's first Academy Award nomination came from producing The Imitation Game, a 2014 biopic about Alan Turing. Black Bear acquired the screenplay after a competition with 30 other interested producers, and fully financed the film on a budget of $15 million. The film went on to earn $233 million worldwide and was nominated for eight Academy Awards and nine BAFTA Awards. Schwarzman was nominated in the Best Picture category from both institutions.. Since then, Black Bear and Schwarzman have been behind Academy Award nominees Mudbound, Nyad, Sing Sing and Train Dreams. Schwarzman received his second Best Picture Academy Award nomination for Train Dreams, which Black Bear produced and fully financed, selling it to Netflix after its Sundance Film Festival world premiere. The film was nominated for four Academy Awards and four Film Independent Spirit Awards, winning Spirit Awards for Best Picture, Best Director, and Best Cinematography. It was named one of the ten best films of 2025 by the American Film Institute and the National Board of Review.

Schwarzman is a past recipient of Variety’s V500, highlighting the 500 most influential business leaders shaping the global media industry. Schwarzman is also a member of the Academy of Motion Picture Arts and Sciences, British Academy of Film and Television Arts, and Producers Guild of America. He sits on the Board of Directors of the Academy Museum of Motion Pictures, BAFTA North America, the Gotham Film Institute, and the Schwarzman Scholars Graduate Program at Tsinghua University in Beijing. Schwarzman is also an honorary Board of Visitors member of his alma mater, Duke University School of Law.

== Personal life ==
Schwarzman married Ellen Marie Zajac, whom he met while at Duke, in November 2007 in Montego Bay, Jamaica. They have three children and live in Los Angeles, California.

== Filmography ==
Producer

- At Any Price (2012)
- Broken City (2013)
- A.C.O.D. (2013)
- All Is Lost (2013)
- The Imitation Game (2014)
- Barry (2016)
- Gold (2016)
- Suburbicon (2017)
- Ben Is Back (2018)
- Light of My Life (2019)
- Our Friend (2019)
- The Rental (2020)
- I Care a Lot (2020)
- Dumb Money (2023)
- Nyad (2023)
- The Marsh King's Daughter (2023)
- Immaculate (2024)
- Relay (2025)
- Christy (2025)
- Tuner (2025)
- The Rivals of Amziah King (2025)
- Train Dreams (2025)
- I Want Your Sex (2026)

Executive producer

- Knock Knock (2015)
- Mudbound (2017)
- The Last Word (2017)
- The Happytime Murders (2018)
- The Operative (2019)
- I Carry You with Me (2020)
- Little Fish (2020)
- Memory (2022)
- Somebody I Used to Know (2023)
- Sing Sing (2023)
- Longlegs (2024)
- Monsieur Spade (2024)
- Goodrich (2024)
- On Swift Horses (2024)
- The Ministry of Ungentlemanly Warfare (2024)
- Shell (2024)
- Shelter (2025)
- A Working Man (2025)
- The Monkey (2025)
- October 8 (2025)
- Motor City (2025)
- In The Grey (2025)
- Wicker (2026)

Thanks

- Crisis (2021)
