= James Kamsickas =

American businessman (born 1966)

James (Jim) Kamsickas
- Born: James K. Kamsickas; 1966 or 1967 (age 59–60); Port Huron, Michigan, US
- Education: Central Michigan University; Michigan State University
- Occupation: Businessman
- Title: former Chairman and CEO, Dana Incorporated
- Term: August 2015-
- Board member of: Dana Incorporated, Manufacturers Alliance for Productivity and Innovation, United Way Greater Toledo

James K. Kamsickas (born 1966) is an American businessman, the former chairman and CEO of Dana Incorporated.

Kamsickas earned a bachelor's degree in business administration from Central Michigan University (1989), an MBA from Michigan State University, and an honorary doctor of commercial science degree from Central Michigan University (2018).

Kamsickas was the CEO of Dana from August 2015 until November 2024, and chairman since December 2019.
