= Inge Thulin =

American businessperson and board member, former CEO 3M Company

- Born: Inge G. Thulin; November 9, 1953 (age 72); Malmö, Sweden
- Education: IHM Business School; School of Business, Economics and Law
- Occupations: Chevron Corporation; Member 2015– 3M Company; CEO 2012–2018; President 2012–2018; COO from 2011 to 2012; Vice President 2011-2012
- Spouse: Helene

Inge Thulin (born November 9, 1953) was the executive chairman of the board at 3M. He had been an executive with the company starting in 1979 and was its chairman, president and CEO between 2012 and 2018. He is a director of Chevron Corporation and Merck.

Thulin was a director for Toro. He holds degrees in business and marketing from the University of Gothenburg in Sweden.

Thulin was a member of President Donald Trump's American Manufacturing Council, before resigning from it on August 16, 2017, in response to the President's statements regarding the Unite the Right rally.

In 2023, Thulin was named by Carnegie Corporation of New York as an honoree of the Great Immigrants Awards.
