= Greater Washington Partnership =

Promotional alliance of Washington, D.C. business leaders

- Founded: 2016
- Founder: Russ Ramsey; Peter Scher; Ted Leonsis; Tony Pierce
- Type: Nonprofit
- Purpose: Economic Growth, Transportation Infrastructure, Workforce Development
- Location(s): Maryland, Virginia and Washington, DC
- CEO: Kathy Hollinger
- Key people: Kathy Hollinger, Kathy Warden, Russ Ramsey, Peter Scher, Ted Leonsis
- Website: www.greaterwashingtonpartnership.com

The Greater Washington Partnership (The Partnership) is an alliance of CEOs and C-suite executives of the region's leading employers in Maryland, Virginia and Washington, DC who are committed to championing the super-region’s economic growth and prosperity. The Partnership identifies shared opportunities and core challenges, offering solutions to critical regional issues including skills and talent, regional mobility, infrastructure and inclusive economic growth.

The organization is led by Chief Executive Officer Kathy Hollinger and Board Chair Kathy Warden, Chair, President and CEO of Northrop Grumman Corporation.

== History ==
The Greater Washington Partnership is an alliance of CEOs and C-suite executives of the region's leading employers in Maryland, Virginia and Washington, DC. The nonprofit was founded in 2016, and grew from an original foundation of a number of businesses working to bring the Olympics (Washington 2024) to the region. The Partnership focuses advancing inclusive growth and fostering unity through three pillars of work: Inclusive Economic Growth, Skills and Talent, and Regional Mobility & Infrastructure. Jason Miller was the Partnership's CEO from 2017 to 2020 and was followed by JB Holston from 2020 to 2022. In 2022, the Partnership named Kathy Hollinger as its CEO. Co-founders include Russ Ramsey, Ramsey Asset Management; Peter L. Scher, JPMorgan Chase & Co.; Ted Leonsis, Monumental Sports and Entertainment.

Transportation and workforce development were two early goals of the organization. In May 2018 the organization advocated for higher tolls.

Developing the region is part of a strategy to encourage more companies to establish themselves within the region.

The organization seeks to establish some standardization in regional educational credentials.

== Activities ==
When Amazon announced a North American sweepstakes for the location of its second headquarters in 2017, the Partnership contributed 11 addendums supporting each of the first round of bids submitted by jurisdictions in the region. “When one wins, we all win,” was the theme used by the Partnership to show Amazon that the region had the businesses, talent, and infrastructure to support being selected as the second headquarters location. In November 2018, Amazon announced Arlington, VA as one of the locations for its second headquarters.

=== Regional Mobility & Infrastructure ===
The Greater Washington Partnership is a founding member of the MetroNow Coalition, which works for long-term improvements to WMATA, the DC Metro system. In May 2018, MetroNow worked with other organizations, including CSG, Federal City Council, Northern Virginia Chamber of Commerce, The 2030 Group, the Greater Washington Board of Trade and Fund It Fix to get DC, Maryland, and Virginia leaders to approve $500 million annual funding for Metro.

In November 2018, the Partnership released its Blueprint for Regional Mobility, a comprehensive transportation strategy to improve commutes, increase transportation options, and provide better access to public transportation for people around Baltimore, Washington, and Richmond. It is the first-ever CEO-led agenda to improve the region's transportation system. The Blueprint lays out four main priorities: connecting the super-region, improving the consumer experience, ensuring equitable access and integrating innovation as the keys to fundamentally transforming the way residents move around the region.

A few of the Partnership's recommendations include a commuter rail network for the region, an expansion of the regions toll-lane network, improving the region's bus network, and growing programs for commuters at private employers.

Dominion Energy CEO Tom Farrell, MedStar Health CEO Kenneth Samet, and EY global chairman and CEO Mark Weinberg are the co-chairs of the Greater Washington Partnership Regional Mobility Initiative and authored the Blueprint.

The Partnership has also released several issue specific reports on buses, integrated mobility, performance-driven tolling, and Richmond's transit revolution. This includes a case study titled “Richmond’s Transit Revolution: GRTC Ridership and Accessibility Analysis,” which was released in June 2019. The study analyzed the launch of the Pulse Bus Rapid Transit (BRT) line, a bus redesign in Richmond and expansion of service in Henrico Country. The Pulse was recognized by the Institute for Transportation and Development Policy with a bronze ranking for design and implementation.

=== Skills and Talent ===
==== Collaborative of Leaders in Academia and Business (CoLAB) ====
One of the Partnership's main initiatives is to grow the region's economic competitiveness. The Greater Washington Partnership created the Collaborative of Leaders in Academia and Business (CoLAB), an alliance of educators and business leaders working together to develop talent in the region by providing them with enhanced digital technology education, to ensure people have the skills that employers require. CoLAB companies include Amazon, Capital One, JPMorgan Chase, MedImmune, Monumental Sports & Entertainment, Northrop Grumman, and Under Armour. University partners include: American University, George Mason University, Georgetown University, Johns Hopkins University, University of Maryland, University of Richmond, Virginia Commonwealth University and Virginia Tech. Wes Bush, Partnership board member and former chairman and CEO of Northrop Grumman serves as the inaugural chair of the CoLAB.

=== Housing ===
In October 2018, the Greater Washington Partnership, together with the Urban Institute and JPMorgan Chase, launched the Regional Housing Framework, in an effort to address the Capital Region's future housing needs.

On September 4, 2019, the Urban Institute released "Meeting the Washington Region’s Future Housing Needs", commissioned by the Greater Washington Partnership and JPMorgan Chase. The report provides business leaders, policy makers, community members and advocates with evidence-based insights so they can join the collective push for solutions and help create a healthy housing market in which residents and businesses thrive.
