= Kevin Plank =

American entrepreneur and philanthropist (born 1972)

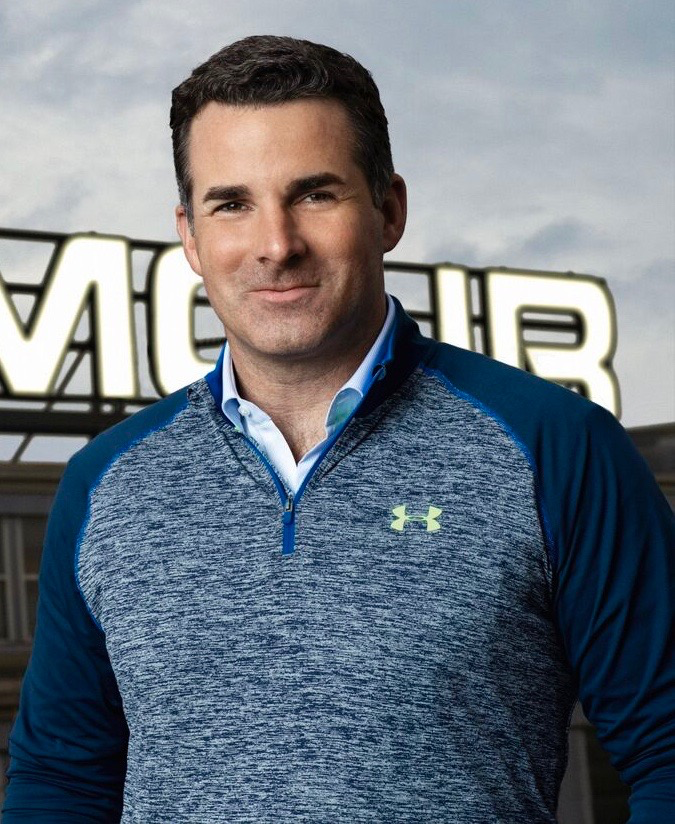
- Plank in 2018
- Born: August 13, 1972 (age 54); Kensington, Maryland, U.S.
- Education: University of Maryland (BA)
- Known for: Founder and executive chairman, Under Armour
- Spouse: Desiree "D.J." Guerzon
- Children: 2

Kevin Audette Plank (born August 13, 1972) is an American billionaire businessman and philanthropist. Plank is the founder and executive chairman of Under Armour, a manufacturer of sportswear, footwear and accessories, based in Baltimore, Maryland. He was CEO from its founding in 1996 until 2020 and returned as CEO in April 2024. As of April 2026, his net worth was estimated at US$1.1 billion.

== Early life ==
Plank, a Roman Catholic, grew up in Kensington, Maryland, a suburb outside of Washington D.C., and was the youngest of five brothers born to William and Jayne (née Harper) Plank. His father was a prominent Maryland land developer. His mother is a former mayor of Kensington, who went on to direct the Office of Legislative and Intergovernmental Affairs at the United States Department of State under President Ronald Reagan.

Plank grew up playing youth football with the Maplewood Sports Association; a Maplewood team has appeared in Under Armour commercials. He was expelled from the Georgetown Preparatory School, a Catholic school, due to failing two classes and an incident where he became intoxicated and fought members of the football team. Plank then enrolled and graduated from St. John's College High School, in 1990, due to his ability to play football. Afterward, he played football at Fork Union Military Academy for a year, trying to get the attention of NCAA Division I schools. He was not recruited by the top-tier collegiate football programs.

However, he went to University of Maryland, College Park and walked onto the team there. He graduated in 1996 with a bachelor's degree in business administration.

His roommate at Maryland was football player and professional wrestler Darren Drozdov. Following a 1999 in-ring accident which left Drozdov quadriplegic, Plank personally financed his customized wheelchair.

== Career ==
While at University of Maryland, Plank launched Cupid's Valentine, a seasonal business selling roses on Valentine's Day. Cupid's Valentine earned $3,000, which Plank used as seed money for Under Armour. He continued to use the "Cupid" name when he later launched his Cupid's Cup competition.

=== Under Armour ===
The idea that led to Under Armour came while playing for the Maryland Terrapins; Plank said he was the "sweatiest guy on the football field". Frustrated by his cotton T-shirts' inability to keep him dry and comfortable, he searched for a material that would wick the sweat from his body. After graduating from Maryland, Plank searched for synthetic materials that would keep athletes dry. Using a mix of his own cash, credit cards, and a Small Business Administration loan, he launched the business. Plank tried several prototypes before deciding on a material.

Plank originally intended to call his new sportswear company Heart, but he was unable to trademark it. He also attempted to name his company Body Armor, but efforts to trademark that name were also unsuccessful. One day, his brother asked him, "How's that company you're working on … Under Armor?" The name stuck. Plank said he chose the British spelling "armour" because he "thought the phone number 888-4ARMOUR was much more compelling than 888-44ARMOR".

Plank initially ran the business from his grandmother's townhouse in Georgetown. Under Armour's first shirt was the #0037, which Plank sold from his car. He also asked his former teammates to try on the shirts, claiming that his alternative to a cotton T-shirt would enhance their performance on the field. As his friends moved on to play professionally, he would send them T-shirts, requesting that they pass them out to other players in their locker rooms. His first big team sale was to Georgia Tech. In 1996, Plank finished his first year selling shirts with $17,000 in sales.

A turning point for him came late in 1999, when Plank used nearly all of Under Armour's money, and employees agreed to go without pay for a few weeks, so the company could take out a $25,000 advertisement in ESPN The Magazine. The ad resulted in $1 million in direct sales for the following year, and athletes and teams began buying the product. Plank's company reached $1 billion annual revenue for the first time in 2010, and Plank became a billionaire in 2011 with an estimated net worth of $1.05 billion.

Between 2014 and 2016, Under Armour spent close to $1 billion to acquire makers of activity- and diet-tracking mobile apps. Many long-term employees questioned Plank's strategy and whether the company would produce a return on their investment. Plank spent hours in one-on-one conversations to try to persuade those employees. The strategy was a success, earning the company the world's largest digital health-and-fitness community, with 150 million users. A few years later, some of these acquisitions would be divested by the next CEO.

As CEO, Plank oversaw a company that generated US$5 billion in annual revenue and employed about 15,800 people as of December 31, 2017.

Plank announced his departure as CEO in October 2019, and was succeeded on January 1, 2020, by Under Armour COO Patrik Frisk.

Plank is a member of the board of trustees for the National Football Foundation.

Plank and Stephanie Ruhle, a journalist, were questioned by lawyers in early 2023 regarding a 2017 lawsuit by shareholders of Under Armour that alleges the company artificially inflated its share price, resulting in losses for them. Court documents showed that Plank gave Ruhle a phone with a special email address to communicate with him privately and at all hours, sent her confidential financial information about the company and enlisted her help to refute concerns about slumping sales. During his deposition, Plank described Ruhle’s role by saying: “She’s a confidant. I would give her counsel on her career and she would give me counsel on things I was dealing with that were either banking or media or human nature in relation.” In her deposition, Ruhle said she took free trips with Plank on his private plane. When asked if she were acting as a friend or journalist on those trips, she said in her deposition: “I was flying on his plane as myself, Stephanie Ruhle. I’m not really in a category one or the other.”

=== Sagamore Farm ===
Plank bought the 630-acre historic Sagamore Farm in Baltimore County, Maryland, in 2007. The property was once owned by Alfred Gwynne Vanderbilt. The farm was the home to stallion Native Dancer, who went 21 for 22 during his racing career from 1952 to 1954. Plank has said he seeks to restore the farm and rejuvenate Maryland's horse racing tradition by raising a Triple Crown winning horse. On November 5, 2010, Sagamore Farms' Shared Account won the $2 million Breeders' Cup Filly & Mare Turf (GI). There are about 100 horses on Sagamore farm, with about 40 actively training as of July 2017.

=== Plank Industries ===
Beginning in 2013, Plank's real estate firm, Sagamore Development, was leading a $5.5-billion mixed-use development project in Baltimore's Port Covington area. The company had acquired approximately 235 acres in the area and planned to build a mix of offices, residential areas, retail space, parks, boat launches and more.

Plank also founded the whiskey distillery Sagamore Spirit in 2013. He was initially approached about creating a vineyard, but being a whiskey enthusiast he asked his business partner to research whiskey. The limestone aquifer on Plank's farm produced water fit to distill whiskey, so Plank and business partner Bill McDermond founded Sagamore Spirit to restore Maryland's whiskey distilling tradition. Its first bottles were sold at stores in 2016.

Plank renovated the former Recreation Pier building in Fells Point, Baltimore. The building was originally built in 1914 to store port cargo and later was a community center and studio for the television series Homicide: Life on the Street; it closed in 1999. Following Plank's renovation, the building reopened as the Sagamore Pendry Hotel.

Plank Industries also bought and revamped the water taxi in Inner Harbor.

=== Other affiliations ===
Plank is on the board of directors of the Boomer Esiason Foundation and a member of the Greater Washington Partnership. In 2026, Plank was named executive-in-residence for the McCormack Department of Sport Management at the University of Massachusetts Amherst.

== Philanthropy ==
=== Baltimore ===
Plank donated $1 million through The Cupid Foundation to the Baltimore-based CollegeBound in 2016. The next year, his charitable arm funded 40 summer jobs for Cherry Hill, Baltimore, public school students in the maritime transport industry.

Plank is also active within the Baltimore and Washington, D.C., communities, as a member of the Greater Baltimore Committee and Greater Washington Partnership. He is also a member of the board of trustees for Living Classrooms, a Baltimore-Washington based non-profit organization dedicated to the hands-on education of young people using urban, natural and maritime environments as “living classrooms". Through his Cupid Foundation, Plank donated $5 million to help create the UA House at Fayette, an East Baltimore community center run by Living Classrooms.

=== Entrepreneurship ===
Plank has been a long-time supporter of the University of Maryland's Robert H. Smith School of Business and Dingman Center for Entrepreneurship. In addition to sitting on the university's board of trustees, he played an integral role in the development of an endowment fund that the Dingman Center uses to invest in viable startup businesses. He is also responsible for the development of the Cupid's Cup business competition. The competition got its name from his “Cupid's Valentine” rose business he began while attending the university.

=== School giving ===
Plank has donated $25 million to the University of Maryland to be used for the proposed athletics and academic complex. The project has converted Cole Field House, the school's former basketball arena, into the football facility, a sports medicine center and student entrepreneurship lab. In 2015, Plank donated $16 million to St. John's College High School in Washington, DC, to fund athletics, academics and entrepreneurship initiatives. Plank donated $1 million to the Archdiocese of Baltimore in 2016 to help 100 more children go to Catholic school.

== Personal life ==
Plank married Desiree Guerzon in 2003, a Filipina-American registered nurse graduated from Georgetown University. They have two children, and live in Lutherville, Maryland. As of April 2026, Forbes estimated his net worth at US$1.1 billion.

Before living in Lutherville, he lived in the Georgetown section of Washington, DC. His former home, when he put it up for sale, was the most expensive home on the market in Washington, DC.

=== Politics ===
According to the Federal Election Commission, Plank has donated to both major U.S. political parties and to individuals of both parties. On CNBC's Halftime Report in February 2017, Plank commented on Donald Trump's pro-business philosophy, saying the president was a "real asset" to the business community. Plank's comments drew criticism on social media. As some customers vowed to boycott the brand, three major endorsers—Stephen Curry, ballerina Misty Copeland, and actor Dwayne "The Rock" Johnson—went on Twitter to express their opposition. Johnson called Plank's words "divisive". In the days following the remarks, Plank bought a full-page advertisement in The Baltimore Sun to clarify his comments. In the ad, Plank said Under Armour stood for job creation, but publicly opposed the president's proposed travel ban.

Plank sat on Trump's American Manufacturing Council. He stepped down from the council following Trump's comments on violence in Charlottesville, Virginia, saying Under Armour "engages in innovation and sports, not politics". Additionally, he publicly opposed President Trump's decision to withdraw from the Paris Accord and was among the Fortune 500 CEOs to sign a pledge to promote workplace diversity and inclusion.

== Recognition ==
=== 2021-2025 ===
- Included in The Daily Record's Power 100 list for five consecutive years

=== 2017 ===
- Achiever of the Year by Success Magazine
- Most Creative People in Business by Fast Company
- Sporting Goods Industry Hall of Famer

=== 2016 ===
- No. 16 on 50 Most Influential People in Sports Business by Sports Business Journal
- No. 37 on Businessperson of the Year list by Fortune
- Game Changer by Men's Fitness
- No. 26 on Power 100 Most Influential Designers, Influencers and Leaders in the Shoe Industry by Footwear News
- No. 6 on 50 Most Influential People in Sports by Sporting News
- No. 63 on Power List by Adweek
- Hall of Champions award by the U.S. Small Business Administration

=== 2015 ===
- No. 23 on 50 Most Influential People in Sports by Sports Business Journal
- No. 36 on Businessperson of the Year by Fortune
- No. 66 on The Power List by Adweek

=== 2014 ===
- Person of the Year by Footwear News
- No. 21 on 50 Most Influential People in Sports Business by Sports Business Journal
- No. 15 on Top People in Business by Fortune

=== 2013 ===
- No. 4 on America's 20 Most Powerful CEOs 40 and Under
- No. 24 on Sports Illustrated's Most Powerful People in Sports
