= Stephen A. Schwarzman =

American businessman (born 1947)

Stephen Schwarzman
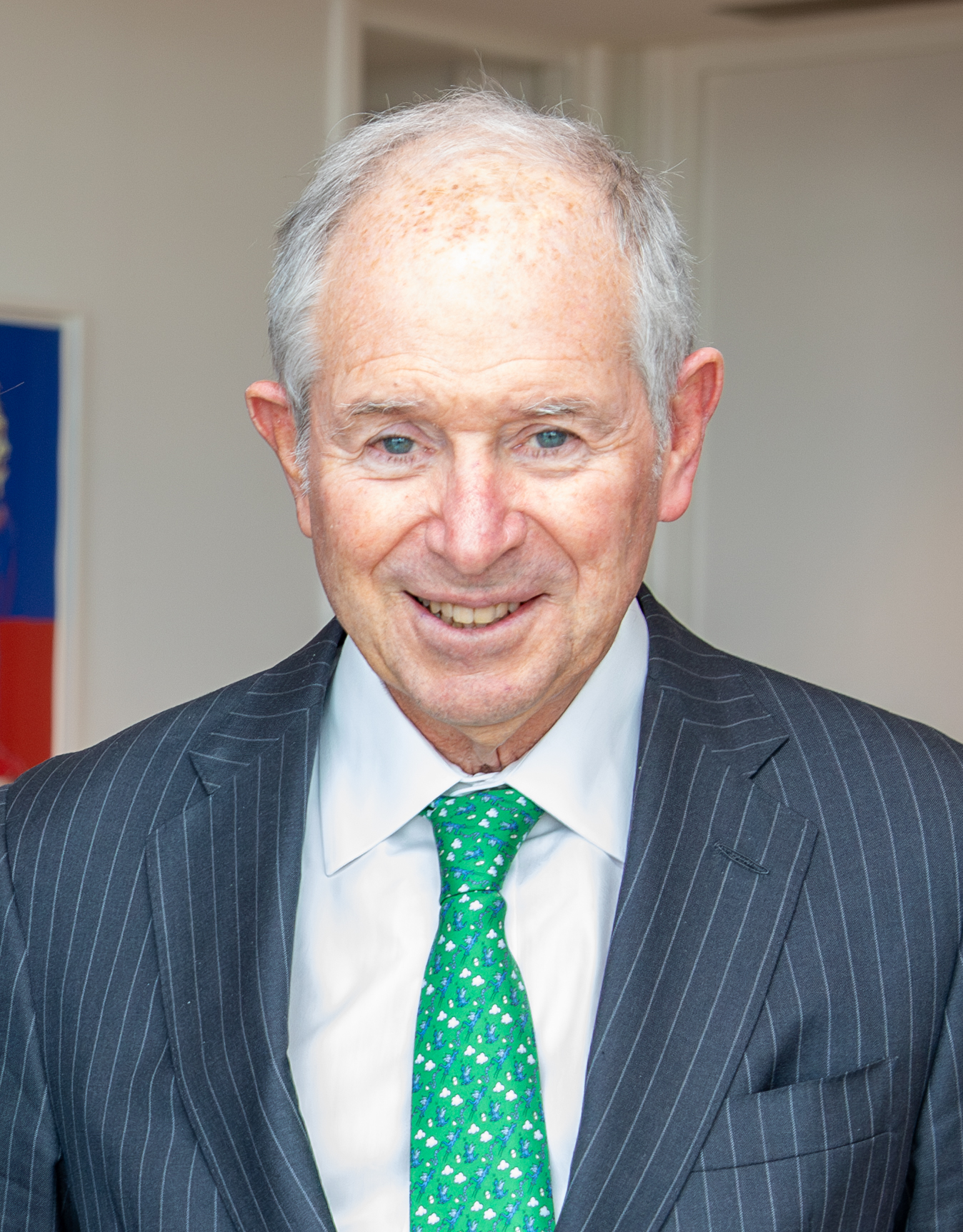
- Schwarzman in 2024

Chairman of the Strategic and Policy Forum
- In office January 20, 2017 – August 16, 2017
- Preceded by: Position established
- Succeeded by: Position abolished

Personal details
- Born: Stephen Allen Schwarzman; February 14, 1947 (age 79) Philadelphia, Pennsylvania, U.S.
- Party: Republican
- Spouse(s): Ellen Philips (1971–1990); Christine Mularchuk Hearst (1995–present)
- Children: 3, including Teddy and Zibby
- Education: Yale University (BA); Harvard University (MBA)
- Known for: Co-founder, chairman and CEO of Blackstone Inc.

Stephen Allen Schwarzman (born February 14, 1947) is an American businessman. He is the chairman and CEO of the private equity firm Blackstone Inc., which he established in 1985 with Peter G. Peterson. Schwarzman was chairman of President Donald Trump's Strategic and Policy Forum, and a major Republican party donor during the 2024 election cycle.

Schwarzman is approximated by Forbes to have a net worth of US$50 billion, in early 2026.

== Early life and education ==
Schwarzman was raised in a Jewish family in Huntingdon Valley, Pennsylvania, the son of Arline and Joseph Schwarzman. His father owned Schwarzman's, a former dry-goods store in Philadelphia, and was a graduate of the Wharton School.

Schwarzman's first business was a lawn-mowing operation when he was 14 years old, employing his younger twin brothers, Mark and Warren, to mow while Stephen brought in clients.

Schwarzman attended the Abington School District in suburban Philadelphia and graduated from Abington Senior High School in 1965. He attended Yale University, where he was a member of senior society Skull and Bones and founded the Davenport Ballet Society. After graduating in 1969, he briefly served in the U.S. Army Reserve before attending Harvard Business School, where he graduated in 1972.

== Investment career ==
Schwarzman's first job in financial services was with Donaldson, Lufkin & Jenrette, an investment bank that merged with Credit Suisse in 2000. After business school, Schwarzman worked at the investment bank Lehman Brothers, became a managing director at age 31, and then head of global mergers and acquisitions. In 1985, Schwarzman and his boss, Peter Peterson, started The Blackstone Group, which initially focused on mergers and acquisitions. Blackstone branched into business acquisition, real estate, direct lending, alternative assets, and had $1.3 trillion in assets under management as of the first quarter of 2026, making it the first alternative asset manager to cross this threshold.

When Blackstone went public in June 2007, it revealed in a securities filing that Schwarzman had earned about $398.3 million in fiscal 2006. He ultimately received $684 million for the part of his Blackstone stake he sold in the IPO, keeping a stake then worth $9.1 billion. In the following years, his compensations increased even more: he received $350 million in 2007 and $702.4 million in 2008—partly due to stock awards. His salary was $734.2 million in 2015, $425 US million in 2016 and $786 US million in 2017. In 2022, he was paid $253 million, making him the highest paid CEO in the US that year. In 2024, Schwarzman received total compensation of approximately $1 billion, comprising $84 million in salary and incentive fees and $916 million in dividends from his roughly 19% stake in Blackstone. In 2025, Schwarzman received $1.24 billion in total remuneration, including $1.1 billion in dividends and $125.6 million in incentive fees and carried interest.

In June 2007, Schwarzman described his view on financial markets with the statement: "I want war, not a series of skirmishes ... I always think about what will kill off the other bidder."

In September 2011, Schwarzman was listed as a member of the international advisory board of the Russian Direct Investment Fund.

As of 2025, Schwarzman is a member of The Business Council.

== Political views and activities ==
Schwarzman states he favors lower taxes, lower government spending, and reproductive rights. He raised $100,000 for George W. Bush's political endeavors.

In August 2010, Schwarzman compared the Obama administration's plan to raise the tax rate on carried interest to a war and Hitler's invasion of Poland in 1939, stating, "It's a war. It's like when Hitler invaded Poland in 1939." Schwarzman later apologized for the analogy. In 2012, Obama called Schwarzman and requested his assistance in brokering a budget agreement with Republicans in congress to avoid a fiscal cliff. Eventually a deal was brokered with Schwarzman's backing. The new tax plan added $1 trillion of additional revenue by raising taxes, closing tax loopholes, and ending deductions. Obama later drafted a formal message of support for Schwarzman Scholars, an education initiative undertaken by Schwarzman.

He endorsed and fundraised for Mitt Romney in 2012. During the 2016 Republican primary, he declined to support any one particular candidate. He identified as center-right and said the eventual GOP nominee should appeal to independent voters, not the right wing of the Republican Party. At the same time, he had positive things to say about Hillary Clinton.

In early 2016, he said that in a two-candidate race he would prefer Donald Trump to Ted Cruz, saying that the nation needed a "cohesive, healing presidency, not one that's lurching either to the right or to the left." He had previously made a donation to Marco Rubio in 2014.

In late 2016, Schwarzman "helped put together" a team of corporate executives to advise Trump on jobs and the economy. The group, which includes JPMorgan Chase CEO Jamie Dimon, Walt Disney boss Bob Iger and former General Electric leader Jack Welch, became Trump's Strategic and Policy Forum. In February, Schwarzman was named as chair of the 16-member President's Strategic and Policy Forum, which brought together "CEOs of America's biggest corporations, banks and investment firms" to consult with the president on "how to create jobs and improve growth for the U.S. economy." On August 16, 2017, following five members' resignations, President Trump announced via Twitter he was disbanding the forum.

He is a longtime friend of president Donald Trump, Schwarzman has received criticism for his involvement with the Trump administration. He responded to this in a letter to current Schwarzman Scholars, arguing that "having influence and providing sound advice is a good thing, even if it attracts criticism or requires some sacrifice”.

In December 2018, non-profit consumer advocacy organisation Public Citizen published a report titled: "'Self-Funded' Trump Now Propped Up By Super PAC Megadonors." The report disclosed that Schwarzman donated $344,000 in support of Trump's re-election campaign. Following his election, Trump appointed Schwarzman as the chairman of the White House Strategic and Policy Forum.

In 2020, Schwarzman donated $15 million to the Senate Leadership Fund, a super-PAC tied to Mitch McConnell, $3 million to Donald Trump's America First Action PAC, and a combined total for the election cycle of $33.5 million to Republican candidates. Several of the Republicans he funded voted against certifying the 2020 Presidential Election.

In private, Schwarzman called the January 6 United States Capitol attack an "insurrection" and "an affront to the democratic values we hold dear". However, he stopped short of criticizing Trump over the riot.

In 2022, Schwarzman said that he would not support Donald Trump's 2024 presidential campaign, stating that it was "time for the Republican Party to turn to a new generation of leaders." In May 2024, he reversed that position and announced that he would support Trump, calling his endorsement a "vote for change." Schwarzman was the twelfth-largest donor during the 2024 election cycle, contributing approximately $40 million to Republican candidates and organizations, including $8 million to a super PAC supporting Republican Senate candidate Tim Sheehy in Montana.

In 2025, Schwarzman said Trump's tariffs in the US had put Europe in a unique position to capture more investment from those looking to diversify away from uncertain markets.

In the fall of 2025, Schwarzman emerged as a key mediator in the dispute between the Trump administration and Harvard University. This followed the freeze of billions of dollars in federal research funding after Harvard rejected sweeping demands from the government to overhaul its governance, admissions, and hiring practices. Schwarzman, a Harvard Business School alumnus who had previously donated $5 million to the school, leveraged his close relationship with Trump and his record as a major donor to multiple universities to facilitate negotiations on Harvard's behalf. He spoke directly with Trump to advance the talks. As of late 2025, a settlement had not been announced despite repeated White House claims that a deal was imminent.

In October 2025, Schwarzman was named by the White House as a donor to the construction of the White House State Ballroom, a proposed 90,000-square-foot (8,400 m^{2}) expansion of the East Wing.

In November 2025, Schwartzman attended a red carpet dinner at the White House for Saudi Crown Prince Mohammed bin Salman. Bin Salman, invited by President Donald Trump, was making his first visit to the United States since the 2018 killing of Jamal Khashoggi, which U.S. intelligence implicated bin Salman in.

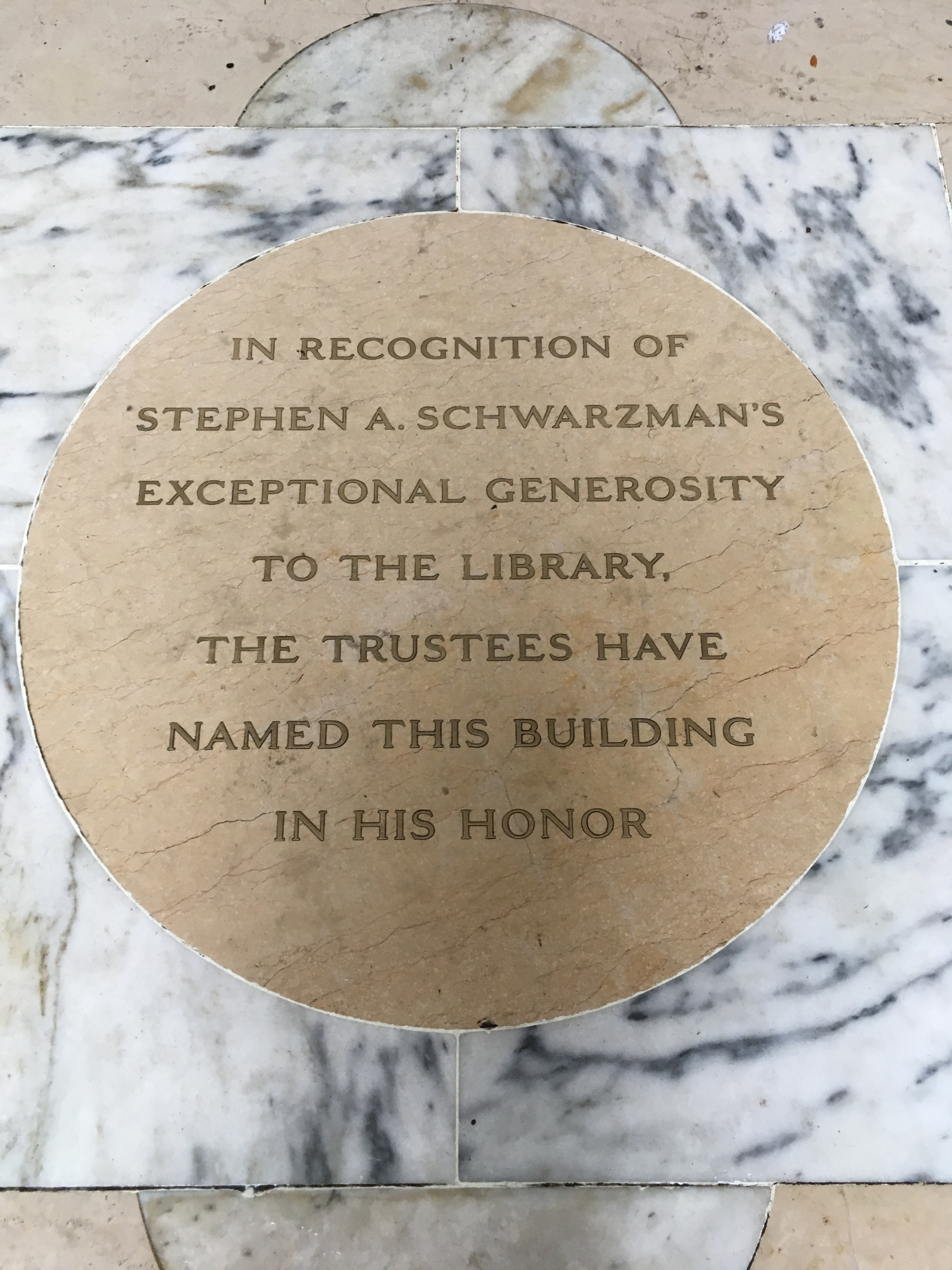
Plaque at the New York Public Library central reference building honoring Schwarzman's contributions

== Philanthropy ==
In 2004, Schwarzman donated a new football stadium, the Stephen A. Schwarzman Stadium, to his high school alma mater, Abington High School. In 2018, he donated an additional $25 million to Abington, and the donation was contingent on several conditions, including naming rights to the school. After the public learned about the deal, a new agreement was made and Schwarzman removed several of the conditions for his donation, including renaming the school.

In 2008, Schwarzman announced that he contributed $100 million toward the expansion of the New York Public Library, of which he served as a trustee. The central reference building on 42nd Street and Fifth Avenue was renamed the Stephen A. Schwarzman Building.

In 2013, Schwarzman announced a $100 million personal gift to establish and endow a scholarship program in China, Schwarzman Scholars, modeled after the Rhodes Scholarship program, to build a network of country experts. The Schwarzman Scholars program is housed at Tsinghua University. Since its inception, the program has maintained ties to the United Front Work Department as well as other organizations and personnel affiliated with the Chinese Communist Party.

In 2015, Peter Salovey, the president of Yale University, announced that Schwarzman contributed $150 million to fund a campus center in the university's "Commons" dining facility. He has sat on the board of trustees of New York-Presbyterian Hospital since 2016 and served on the Board of Trustees at the Frick Collection from at least 2004 to 2022.

In 2018, Schwarzman donated $10 million to the National Library of Israel, described as his first major philanthropic gift in Israel. The gift established the Stephen A. Schwarzman Education Center in the library's new campus adjacent to the Knesset. It was designed by Herzog & de Meuron, and intended to serve visitors of all faiths. Schwarzman said he hoped the center would foster "cross-cultural relationships" between Jews, Christians, and Muslims. That same year, Schwarzman donated $350 million to the Massachusetts Institute of Technology to create the Schwarzman College of Computing.

In 2019, the University of Oxford announced that Schwarzman had donated £150 million to establish the Schwarzman Centre for the Humanities, described at the time as the largest single donation to Oxford since the Renaissance. The centre opened at the start of the 2025–26 academic year, uniting all humanities faculties under one roof for the first time in Oxford's history and housing a new Institute for Ethics in AI.

Schwarzman announced in February 2020 that he had signed The Giving Pledge, committing to give the majority of his wealth to philanthropic causes. He later pledged $8 million to the USA Track and Field Foundation in the run-up to the 2021 Tokyo and 2024 Paris Olympics.

In 2021, Schwarzman and his wife Christine gave $25 million to the Animal Medical Center of New York in New York City. The hospital was renamed The Stephen and Christine Schwarzman Animal Medical Center.

In early 2026, The Wall Street Journal reported that the Stephen A. Schwarzman Foundation was being expanded with the aim of becoming one of the ten largest private foundations in the United States. Its expected areas of focus include education, artificial intelligence, and culture.

== Personal life ==
Schwarzman married his first wife Ellen Philips in 1971, a trustee of Northwestern University and the Mount Sinai Medical Center. They had two children: film producer Teddy Schwarzman and writer and podcaster Zibby Owens. The couple divorced in 1990.

Schwarzman married Christine Hearst in 1995, an intellectual property lawyer who grew up on Long Island, New York. She has one child from a previous marriage.

He lives in a duplex apartment at 740 Park Avenue previously owned by John D. Rockefeller Jr. Schwarzman purchased the apartment from Saul Steinberg. Schwarzman owns a country estate in Wiltshire, England.

Schwarzman purchased the Miramar mansion in Newport, Rhode Island, for $27 million in 2021. He restored it and filled it with art, and has stated that he and his wife intend to open the estate to the public after their deaths.

According to Bloomberg Billionaires Index, he had a net worth of $32 billion as of October 2022. According to Forbes, Schwarzman has a net worth of $39 billion, as of April 2024. He spent millions of dollars on both his sixtieth and seventieth birthday parties.

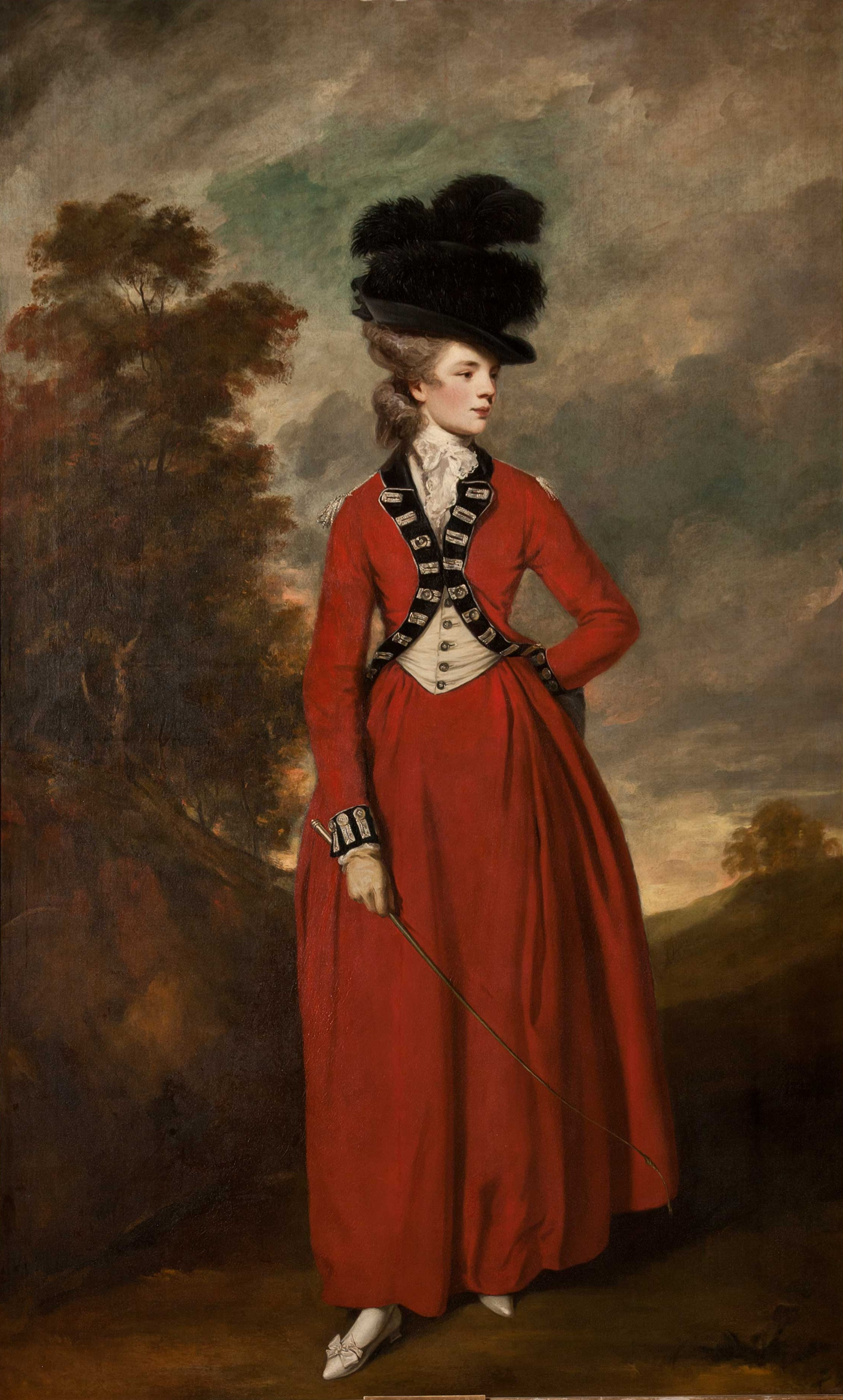
Schwarzman's art collection includes the iconic full-length Portrait of Lady Worsley by Joshua Reynolds that was bought from the family of David Lascelles, Earl of Harewood, for £25 million.

== Controversies ==
In 2011, The Wall Street Journal reported on the vast water consumption of wealthy Palm Beach residents during exceptional drought conditions. Schwarzman was listed as a top-five water user, having consumed 7,409,688 gallons between June 2010 and May 2011. The average Palm Beach resident consumes 108,000 gallons per year. In 2025, Schwarzman had tankers of water delivered from standpipes in a drought-affected area of Hampshire, England, to his 2,500-acre estate Conholt Park in the neighboring county of Wiltshire, to help fill a lake on his land. The BBC reported that Southern Water had, in response, imposed a ban on tankers taking the water.

== Awards and recognition ==
In 1999, Schwarzman received the American Academy of Achievement's Golden Plate Award. In 2018, Schwarzman was awarded the Plaque degree of the Order of the Aztec Eagle by Mexico President Enrique Peña Nieto for his role in supporting the United States–Mexico–Canada Agreement. In 2024, King Charles III made Schwarzman an Honorary Knight Commander of the Order of the British Empire (KBE) for services to philanthropy.

In 2007, Schwarzman was listed among Time's 100 Most Influential People in The World. In 2014 and 2016, Schwarzman was named as one of Bloomberg's 50 Most Influential people of the year.

In 2019, Schwarzman wrote his first book titled, What It Takes: Lessons in the Pursuit of Excellence, "which draws from his experiences in business, philanthropy and public service." His book became a New York Times Best Seller. However, the title was included with a dagger next to it, which is utilized to indicate that retailers reported receiving bulk purchases.

== See also ==
- Park Avenue: Money, Power and the American Dream, a documentary about the wealth gap that refers to Schwarzman.
