= List of Intel manufacturing sites =

Intel is an American multinational corporation and technology company headquartered in Santa Clara, California. Processors are manufactured in semiconductor fabrication plants called "fabs" which are then sent to assembly and testing sites before delivery to customers. Intel has stated that approximately 75% of their semiconductor fabrication is performed in the United States.

Since May 1990, Intel has made an effort to eliminate chlorofluorocarbon consumption for the Oregon, Puerto Rico and Ireland system factories.

Both Schumacher, a division of Air Products & Chemicals, and Intel developed chemical that reduce ozone emission using TRANS-LC or trans 1, 2-dichloroethylene to replace from TCA or 1,1,1-Trichloroethane to grow defect free silicon oxide surfaces.

The Oregon Governor's Award for Toxics Use Reduction recognising Intel's Hillsboro facility achievement in reducing the use of toxic substance and generation of hazardous wastes.

== Current fab sites ==
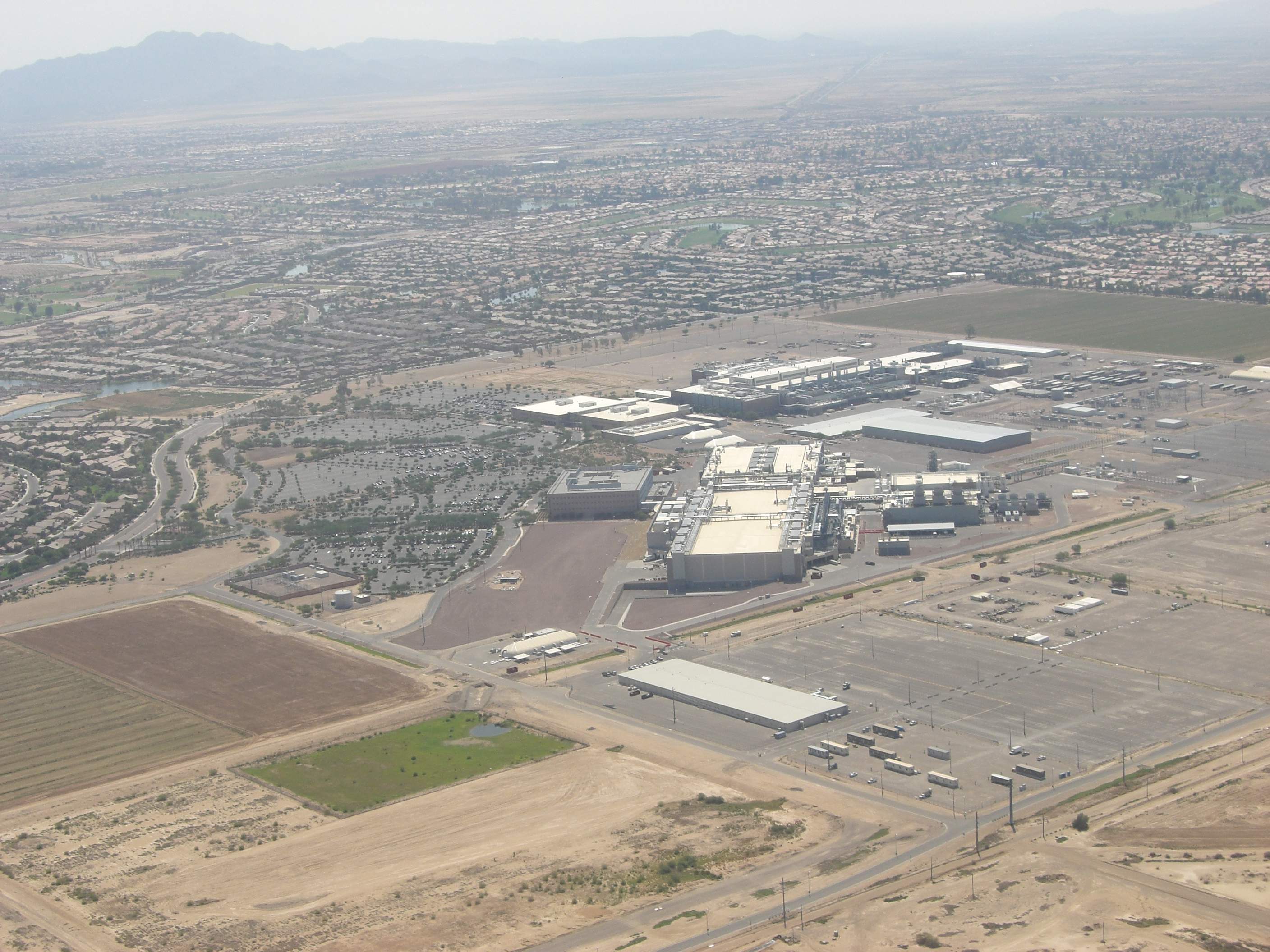
Intel Ocotillo campus in Chandler, Arizona, U.S.

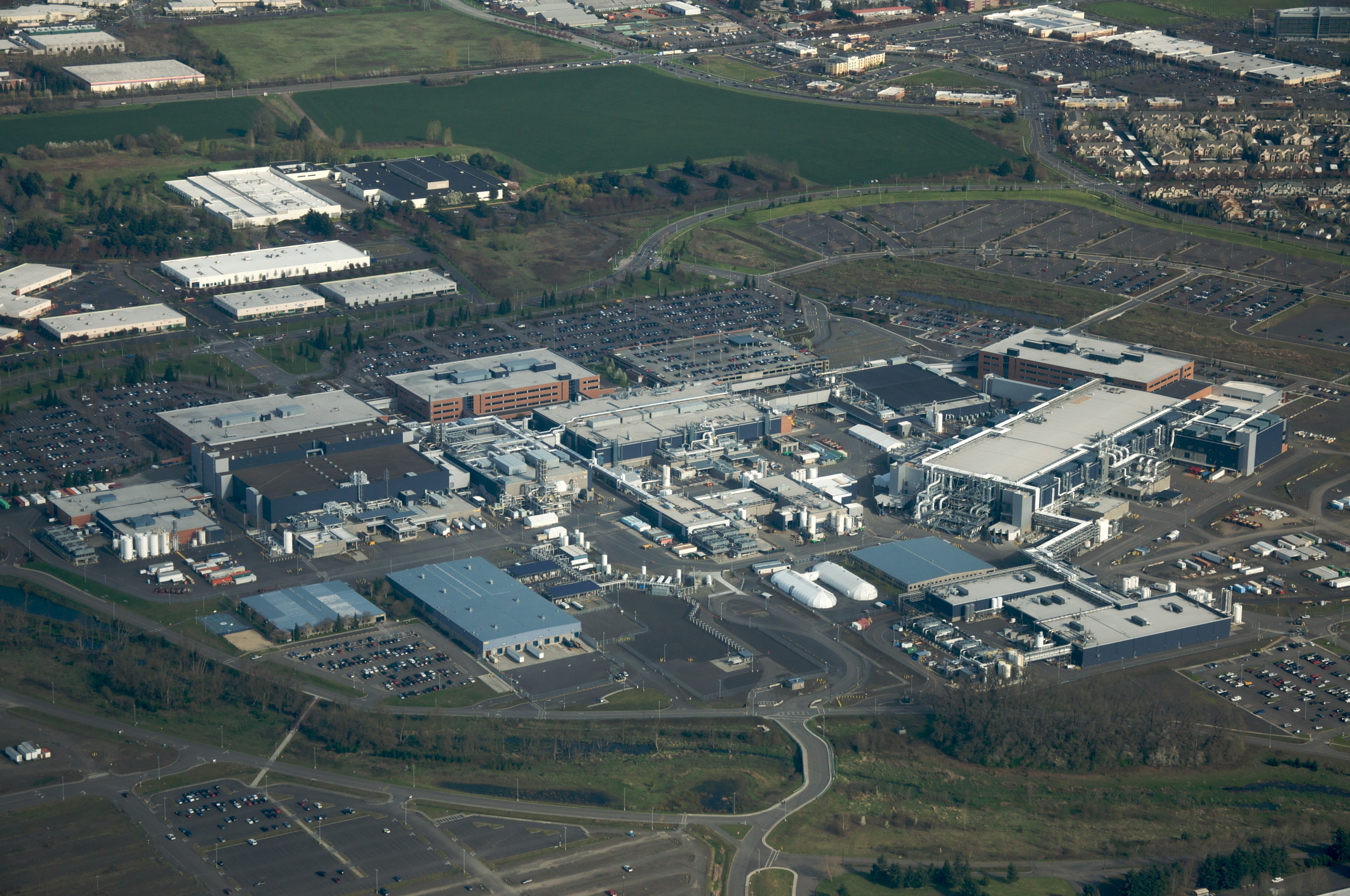
Intel Ronler Acres in Hillsboro, Oregon, U.S.

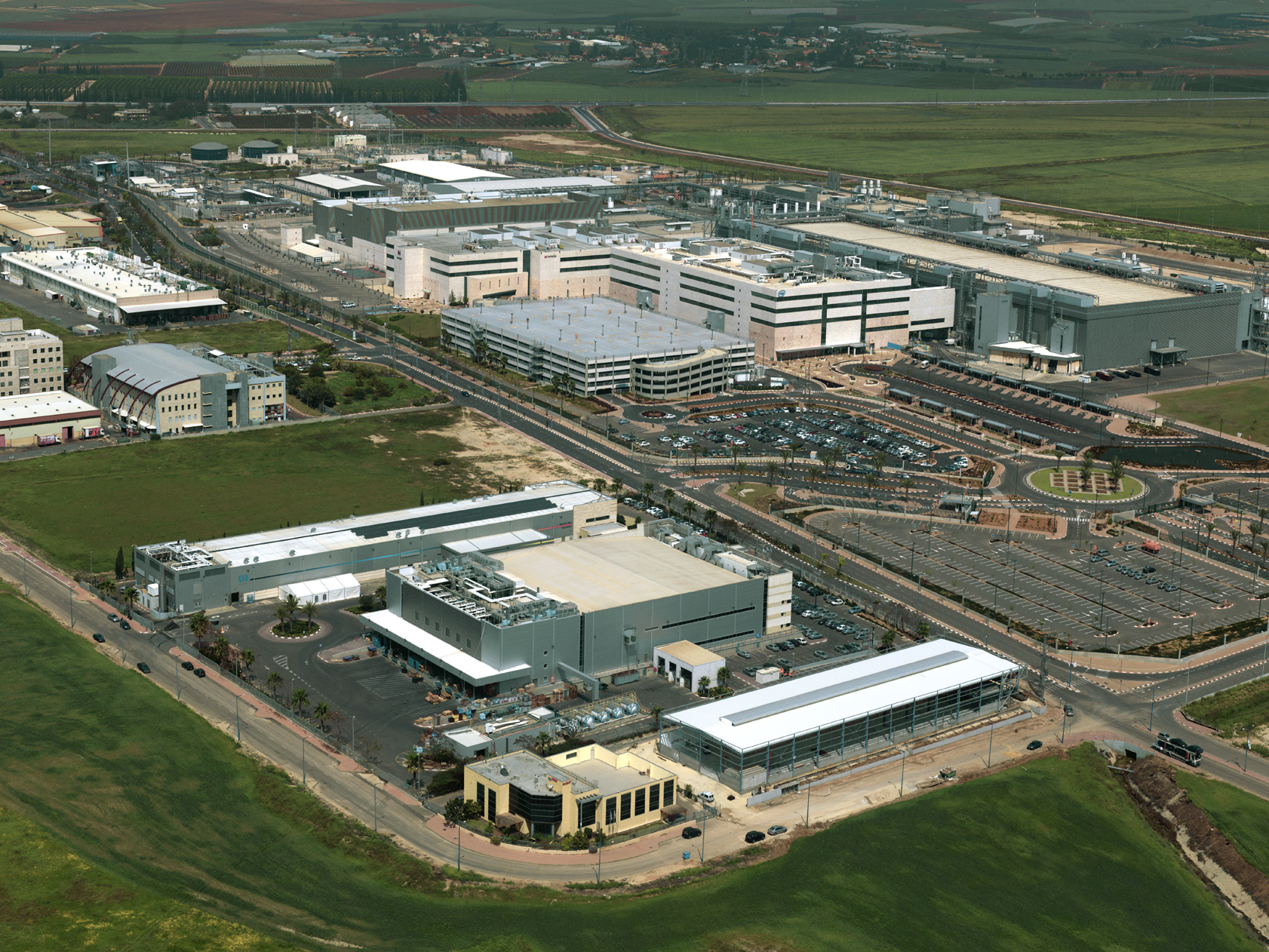
Intel F28 in Kiryat Gat, Israel

Fab name	Fab location	Coordinates	Production start year	Process (wafer, node)
AFO	(United States) Aloha, Oregon, U.S.		1976	300mm, Development
D1B	(United States) Hillsboro, Oregon, U.S.	45.547077°N 122.914253°W	1996	300mm, Development
RB1	(United States) Hillsboro, Oregon, U.S.	45.546115°N 122.914135°W	2001	300mm, Development
D1C	(United States) Hillsboro, Oregon, U.S.	45.545013°N 122.913982°W	2001	300mm, Development
RP1	(United States) Hillsboro, Oregon, U.S.	45.543372°N 122.913988°W	2001	300mm, Research
D1D	(United States) Hillsboro, Oregon, U.S.	45.543331°N 122.916284°W	2003	300mm, Development
D1X	(United States) Hillsboro, Oregon, U.S.	45.542132°N 122.920634°W	2013	300mm, Development
Fab 10	(Republic of Ireland) Leixlip, Ireland	53.375428°N 6.522446°W	1994	
Fab 11X	(United States) Rio Rancho, New Mexico, U.S.	35.223978°N 106.654866°W	1995 upgrade 2020/2021 with 22/14	300mm, 45 nm/32 nm, Packaging
Fab 12	(United States) Chandler, Arizona, U.S.		2006	300mm, 22 nm/14 nm/10 nm
Fab 18	Kiryat Gat, Israel	31.597095°N 34.788004°E		
Fab 22	(United States) Chandler, Arizona, U.S.	33.242508°N 111.885222°W	2002	300mm, 22 nm/14 nm/10 nm
Fab 24	(Republic of Ireland) Leixlip, Ireland	53.373917°N 6.516620°W	2006	300mm, 14 nm
Fab 27	(United States) Licking County, Ohio, U.S.	40.11660°N 82.71186°W	(2030–2032)	300mm, 14A
Fab 28a	Kiryat Gat, Israel		1996	300mm, 22 nm
Fab 28	Kiryat Gat, Israel	31.594650°N 34.789324°E	(2023)	300mm, 22nm/14nm/10nm
Fab 32	(United States) Chandler, Arizona, U.S.	33.244029°N 111.887105°W	2007	300mm, 22 nm/14 nm/10 nm
Fab 34	(Republic of Ireland) Leixlip, Ireland	53.377021°N 6.526093°W	2023	300mm, Intel 4 (previously node 7nm), Intel 3
Fab 38	Kiryat Gat, Israel	31.590970°N 34.791051°E	(2024)	300mm, 22 nm
Fab 42	(United States) Chandler, Arizona, U.S.	33.243778°N 111.890082°W	2020	300mm, 10 nm/5 nm (2024)
Fab 52	(United States) Chandler, Arizona, U.S.	33.240765°N 111.889980°W	2025	300mm, 18A
Fab 62	(United States) Chandler, Arizona, U.S.	33.239668°N 111.889851°W	(2026)	300mm
SC2	(United States) Santa Clara, California, U.S.			Reticle/Masks, Intel Mask Operations
Pelican	Penang, Malaysia		(2024)	300mm, Packaging

== Past fab sites ==
Fab name	Fab location	Opened	Closed	Notes
Fab 1	(United States) Mountain View, California, U.S.	1968	1981	Formerly located at 365 East Middlefield Road.
Fab 2	(United States) Santa Clara, California, U.S.	1968	2009	Located in building SC1, at the corner of Bowers Ave. and Central Expressway
Fab 1A	(United States) Santa Clara, California, U.S.	1980	1991	Located on Mission College Boulevard
Fab 3	(United States) Livermore, California, U.S.	1973	1991	Plant began making wafers in April 1973. First plant outside of the Santa Clara area, and is where the famous Bunny Suits were first introduced. Located on North Mines Road.
Fab 4	(United States) Aloha, Oregon, U.S.	1976	1996 (decommissioned); 2016 (demolished)	First wafer manufacturing plant outside of Silicon Valley and first facility in what is now known as Oregon's Silicon Forest. Production began for 3-inch wafers.
Fab 5 / D1	(United States) Aloha, Oregon, U.S.			Previously a development facility, then production facility. Currently inactive. Intel original Pentium was made there.
Fab 6	(United States) Chandler, Arizona, U.S.	1980	2000	First silicon wafer manufacturing facility in Arizona. Key architecture was the 286 microprocessor.
Fab 7	(United States) Rio Rancho, New Mexico, U.S.	1980	2002; 2005 (converted to test facility)	Production focused on flash memory chips. In June, 1993 they have started the production of 0.8-micron flash chips at this location. Fourth-generation Flash products which was using the 0.6-micron process were made. By the time production stopped, plant was producing 0.35 micron-6 inch wafers. In 2005, $105 million was invested to temporarily turn Fab 7 into a testing facility.
Fab 8	Jerusalem, Israel	1985	2008; 2009 (converted to die prep facility)	First Fab outside of the United States. Ended production with, what was at the time, the last 6-inch wafer fab. Building was converted into die prep facility to support nearby Fab 28.
Fab 9	(United States) Rio Rancho, New Mexico, U.S.	1987		Facility eventually expanded to merge with Fab 11 in 1999.
D2	(United States) Santa Clara, California, U.S.	1989	2009 (decommissioned)	Development for these EPROM, Flash memory and microcontroller technology. They expanded this location which was previously used for research and development. They were manufactured by using the eight-inch wafers. They have expanded up to 300,000 square foot complex and adding the 12,000 square feet of "Class-1" clean room bringing up to total of 37,000 square feet. After being decommissioned, was converted into a data center.
Fab 10 / IFO	(Republic of Ireland) Leixlip, Ireland	1993		Pentium
Fab 11	(United States) Rio Rancho, New Mexico, U.S.			(Merged into F11X)
Fab 14	(Republic of Ireland) Leixlip, Ireland	1998	2009	250nm
Fab 15 / D1A	(United States) Aloha, Oregon, U.S.		2003 (converted to assembly / test)	Previously a development Fab named D1A before construction began on D1B in 1994.
Fab 16	(United States) Ft. Worth, Texas, U.S.	(never opened)	2003 (canceled)	Planned to open in Ft. Worth, Texas, in 1999, but was eventually canceled in 2003.
Fab 17	(United States) Hudson, Massachusetts, U.S.	1998 (acquired from DEC)	2014	Facility used older technology and closed (along with Fab 11X) because site was not large enough to accommodate a leading-edge fab. Made specialty products on the trailing edge of chip technology, and was last to make chips on 200-millimeter silicon wafers.
Fab 20 / D1B	(United States) , Hillsboro, Oregon, U.S.			
Fab 23	(United States) Colorado Springs, Colorado, U.S.	2000 (acquired from Rockwell)	2007	Site originally purchased from Rockwell, but due to lack of demand and for financial reasons, Intel put it up for sale in 2007. It eventually sold in 2011 to the El Paso County government, who repurposed the offices.
Fab 68	Dalian, Liaoning, China	2010/2016	2021	3DNAND, 3DXPoint fab that was sold to SK Hynix

== Assembly and test sites ==
- AFO, Aloha, Oregon, United States
- Chandler, Arizona, United States
- CD1, Chengdu, Sichuan, China
- CD6, Chengdu, Sichuan, China
- KMDSDP, Kulim, Malaysia
- SBDSDP, Sibu, Sarawak, Malaysia
- KKDSDP, Kota Kinabalu, Sabah, Malaysia
- KMO, Kulim, Malaysia
- KM5, Kulim, Malaysia
- PG8, Penang, Malaysia
- VNAT, Ho Chi Minh City, Vietnam
- Jerusalem, Israel
- CRAT, Heredia, Belén, Costa Rica (1997–2014; 2020 – present)
- Makati, Philippines – MN1-MN5 also known as A2/T11 (1974–2009)
- Cavite, Philippines – CV1-CV4 (1997–2009)
- Shanghai, China (former Assembly / Test Manufacturing)
- Las Piedras Puerto Rico 1991-2001 (assemble Pentium CPU/Motherboards)

== See also ==
- List of semiconductor fabrication plants
