= Manufacturers Alliance for Productivity and Innovation =

American nonprofit network

MAPI (Manufacturers Alliance)
- Company type: Private
- Founded: 1933
- Headquarters: Arlington, Virginia, USA
- Key people: Stephen Gold, President & CEO; Rae Ann Johnson, SVP & General Counsel; Dave Augliera, VP Membership; Kristin Graybill, VP External Affairs
- Number of employees: Under 50

The Manufacturers Alliance for Productivity & Innovation (MAPI) (formerly the Machinery and Allied Products Institute) is a non-profit manufacturing leadership network that offers benchmarking, professional development, and research services. Member companies are executives in medium and large global manufacturers such as Caterpillar, Ingersoll-Rand, and Oshkosh Corporation.

== Councils ==
MAPI's benchmarking and networking services are delivered through executive Councils, which are organized into around 25 different functions, in Finance, Operations, Strategy, Growth, Management, Legal, and Internet social security. Councils exist in several sub specialties, such as Internal Audit, Marketing, HR, Taxes, Product Liability, Environmental Management, etc Councils are membership-based, and offer participants a blend of face-to-face roundtable discussion, member-led best practices case studies, and MAPI facilitated networking and benchmarking outside the meeting room.

== Research ==
MAPI's research program focuses on Economic Analyses and Forecasting, Legal and Regulatory commentary, and Benchmark Surveys. Its executives and their work are regularly featured in outlets such as the Associated Press , Wall Street Journal , and Industry Week.

Recent research has looked at Buy American provisions , infrastructure spending , economic stimulus in China , Offshoring, and Corporate Social Responsibility. Leading media outlets turn to MAPI regularly as an authority in issues impacting the manufacturing sector.

== Location ==
Its offices are located in Arlington, Virginia, in the USA.
