= List of speakers at The Economic Club of Washington, D.C. =

The list of speakers hosted by The Economic Club of Washington, D.C. since its founding in 1986 are as follows (in chronological order):

== Speakers ==
Speaker	Organization	Title	Date
Roger Smith	General Motors	Chairman and CEO	September 11, 1986
James Baker	United States Department of the Treasury	Secretary	January 29, 1987
Heinz Ruhnau	Lufthansa	President and Executive Board Chairman	June 18, 1987
Yusuke Kashiwagi	Bank of Tokyo	Chairman	September 22, 1987
Felix Rohatyn	Lazard	Partner	January 26, 1988
Beryl Sprinkel	Council of Economic Advisers	Chairman	March 9, 1988
John Fellows Akers	IBM	Chairman	May 11, 1988
John Phelan	New York Stock Exchange	Chairman and CEO	September 29, 1988
Dr. Mariana V. Whitman	General Motors	Group Executive Vice President	November 3, 1988
David T. Kearns	Xerox	Chairman and CEO	January 31, 1989
James Wolfensohn	James D. Wolfensohn Inc	President	March 29, 1989
Katharine Graham	Washington Post Company	Chairman of the Board and CEO	May 25, 1989
John S. Reed	Citigroup	Chairman and CEO	September 14, 1989
Dr. Horst Langer	Siemens	CEO and chairman of the Board	January 31, 1990
Michael Boskin	Council of Economic Affairs	Chairman	March 13, 1990
Samuel K. Skinner	United States Department of Transportation	Secretary	May 9, 1990
Allen E. Murray	Mobil	Chairman of the Board and CEO	October 9, 1990
Alice Rivlin	Brookings Institution	Senior Fellow, Economic Studies Program	November 27, 1990
Lloyd Bentsen	United States Senate	Senator from Texas	March 7, 1991
Robert Allen	AT&T	Chairman and chief executive officer	May 8, 1991
James Lynn	Aetna	Chairman	September 12, 1991
Peter Drucker	Claremont Graduate School	Professor of Social Science and Management	November 14, 1991
Andreas van Agt	Delegation of the Commission of the European Communities	Head of Delegation	January 22, 1992
Robert Reich	John F. Kennedy School of Government, Harvard University	Professor	March 11, 1992
William Schreyer	Merrill Lynch	Chairman of the Board	June 4, 1992
John W. Snow	CSX Corporation	Chairman, President and CEO	September 19, 1992
Norman Ornstein	American Enterprise Institute	Resident Scholar	November 12, 1992
Robert S. Strauss	Akin, Gump, Strauss, Hauer and Feld	Partner	January 12, 1993
Ted Turner	Turner Broadcasting System	Chairman of the Board	March 16, 1993
Robert Rubin		Assistant to the President for Economic Policy	June 14, 1993
Norman R. Augustine	Martin Marietta	Chairman and CEO	October 13, 1993
Hedrick Smith	Foreign Policy Institute, Johns Hopkins University	Editor In Residence	February 2, 1994
Mickey Kantor		United States Trade Representative	June 2, 1994
Hillary Clinton		The First Lady	June 28, 1994
Bill Marriott	Marriott International	Chairman of the Board & President	October 13, 1994
Michael Porter	Harvard Business School	Professor	December 12, 1994
Bert C. Roberts Jr.	MCI Communications	Chairman & CEO	June 28, 1995
Jack Valenti	Motion Picture Association of America	President & CEO	September 28, 1995
Ira Michael Heyman	Smithsonian Institution	Secretary	November 29, 1995
Bernard L. Schwartz	Loral Corporation	Chairman and CEO	December 14, 1995
Hugh Bernard Price	National Urban League	President & CEO	February 22, 1996
Paul Krugman	Department of Economics, Stanford University	Professor	April 10, 1996
Lawrence Bossidy	AlliedSignal	Chairman and CEO	June 19, 1996
Paul Tagliabue	National Football League	Commissioner	December 11, 1996
Arthur Zeikel	Merrill Lynch	President and CEO	March 13, 1997
Franklin Raines	United States Office of Management and Budget	Director	May 20, 1997
Raymond W. Smith	Bell Atlantic	Chairman & CEO	October 30, 1997
Dennis Archer	Detroit	Mayor	December 16, 1997
Richard Grasso	New York Stock Exchange	Chairman & CEO	January 14, 1998
Michel Camdessus	International Monetary Fund	Managing Director & Chairman of the Executive Board	March 12, 1998
Gerald Greenwald	United Airlines	Chairman & CEO	September 14, 1998
Anthony A. Williams	District of Columbia	Mayor-Elect	November 18, 1998
Knight Kiplinger	The Kiplinger Letter; Kiplinger's Personal Finance Magazine	Editor; Editor-in-Chief	January 14, 1999
George Mitchell	Verner Liipfert Bernhard McPherson & Hand	Special Counsel	March 4, 1999
Charlene Barshefsky		United States Trade Representative	March 16, 1999
Kenneth Clarke	Parliament of the United Kingdom of Great Britain and Northern Ireland	Member of Parliament	May 17, 1999
Nicholas Chabraja	General Dynamics	Chairman & CEO	October 14, 1999
Arthur Levitt Jr.	Securities & Exchange Commission	Chairman	April 6, 2000
Sidney Taurel	Eli Lilly	Chairman and CEO	June 6, 2000
Frederick W. Smith	FedEx	Chairman, President and CEO	September 27, 2000
Thomas Mann	Brookings Institution	Presidential Scholar	November 15, 2000
Brian Roberts	Comcast	President	January 24, 2001
Sean O'Huiginn	Ambassador of Ireland to the United States	Embassy of Ireland	March 21, 2001
Niall FitzGerald	Unilever	Chairman	May 14, 2001
Al Neuharthh	Freedom Forum; USA Today	Founder	October 16, 2001
Sir James D. Wolfensohn	World Bank	President	December 6, 2001
Dr. Craig Venter	Celera Genomics	President & Chief Scientific Officer	January 17, 2002
Paul O'Neill	United States Department of the Treasury	Secretary	April 30, 2002
Richard Fairbank	Capital One	Chairman and CEO	September 24, 2002
Paul Volcker	Board of Governors of the Federal Reserve System	Former Chairman	February 11, 2003
Dr. Joseph Stigliz	Columbia University	Professor; 2011 Nobel Laureate	March 13, 2003
Daniel Yergin	Cambridge Energy Research Associates	President	May 14, 2003
John Snow	United States Department of the Treasury	Secretary	November 5, 2003
William McDonough	Public Company Accounting Oversight Board	Chairman	December 3, 2003
Kenneth Courtis	Goldman Sachs Asia	Vice Chairman	February 12, 2004
Tim Russert	NBC News	Washington Bureau Chief	April 13, 2004
David M. Rubenstein	Carlyle Group	Founding Partner and Managing Director	June 18, 2004
Frank Raines	Fannie Mae	Chairman and CEO	October 19, 2004
Charles Cook	Cook Political Report	Editor and Publisher	December 13, 2004
Timothy Geithner	Federal Reserve Bank of New York	President and CEO	February 9, 2005
Melinda Gates	Bill & Melinda Gates Foundation	Co-Founder	May 12, 2005
Richard Parsons	Time Warner	Chairman and CEO	October 19, 2005
George W. Bush	43rd President of the United States	President of the United States	October 26, 2005
Anne Mulcahy	Xerox	Chairman of the Board and CEO	November 10, 2005
Jeff Immelt	General Electric	Chairman and CEO	January 19, 2006
Michael Turner	BAE Systems	Chief Executive Officer	May 10, 2006
Ben Bernanke	Board of Governors of the Federal Reserve System	Chairman	October 4, 2006
Robert Rubin	Citigroup; United States Department of the Treasury	Director and chairman; former Secretary	November 9, 2006
Peter Peterson	Blackstone Group	Senior Chairman and Co-Founder	February 8, 2007
Henry Paulson	United States Department of the Treasury	Secretary	March 1, 2007
Jeffrey B. Kindler	Pfizer	Chairman and chief executive officer	May 2, 2007
Kenneth Chenault	American Express	Chief Executive Officer and Chairman	October 2, 2007
Henry Kravis	KKR	Principal	November 20, 2007
Robert Zoellick	World Bank	President	January 17, 2008
Jamie Dimon	JPMorgan Chase	Chairman of the Board & CEO	March 12, 2008
Ruth Simmons	Brown University	President	April 2, 2008
Eric Schmidt	Google	Chairman of the Board and CEO	June 9, 2008
Rick Wagoner	General Motors	Chairman and CEO	September 16, 2008
Henry Paulson	United States Department of the Treasury	Secretary	January 7, 2009
Paul Otellini	Intel	President & CEO	February 9, 2009
Randall L. Stephenson	AT&T	Chairman & CEO	March 11, 2009
Larry Summers	National Economic Council	Director	April 9, 2009
Timothy Geithner	United States Department of the Treasury	Secretary	April 22, 2009
Indra Nooyi	PepsiCo	Chairman & CEO	May 12, 2009
Christina Romer	Council of Economic Advisers	Chair	August 6, 2009
Rex Tillerson	ExxonMobil	Chairman and CEO	October 1, 2009
Bill Marriott	Marriott International	Chairman and CEO	November 19, 2009
Ben Bernanke	Board of Governors of the Federal Reserve System	Chairman	December 7, 2009
Donald E. Graham	Washington Post Company	Chairman and CEO	March 2, 2010
Peter R. Orszag	Office of Management & Budget	Director	April 8, 2010
Muhtar Kent	Coca-Cola Company	President & Chief Executive Officer	May 19, 2010
Ivan Seidenberg	Verizon Communications	Chairman & CEO	June 22, 2010
Kenneth Feinberg	Feinberg Rozen, LLP; TARP Executive Compensation	Founder, Managing Partner; Special Master	July 19, 2010
Chris Dodd	United States Senate; Senate Banking Committee	Senator from Connecticut; Chairman	September 29, 2010
Ted Leonsis	Monumental Sports & Entertainment	Founder and CEO	October 15, 2010
Daniel Akerson	General Motors	CEO	December 10, 2010
Bill Gates	Microsoft	Chairman	March 8, 2011
Jeff Immelt	General Electric	Chairman and chief executive officer	March 31, 2011
Julius Genachowski	Federal Communications Commission	Chairman	April 20, 2011
Jack Lew	Office of Management & Budget	Director	May 23, 2011
Saxby Chambliss	United States Senate	Senator from Georgia	June 8, 2011
Mark Warner	United States Senate	Senator from Virginia	June 8, 2011
Tony Blair	Government of the United Kingdom; Quartet on the Middle East	Former Prime Minister; Representative to the Middle East	June 28, 2011
John Boehner	United States House of Representatives	Speaker	September 15, 2011
Thomas Donilon		National Security Advisor	September 16, 2011
Ursula Burns	Xerox	Chairman and CEO	October 5, 2011
Gene Sperling	National Economic Council	Director; Assistant to the President for Economic Policy	October 31, 2011
Eric Schmidt	Google	Executive Chairman	December 12, 2011
Walter Isaacson	Aspen Institute	President and CEO	January 19, 2012
Steve Case	Revolution	Chairman and CEO	February 23, 2012
Jeff Bewkes	Time Warner	Chairman of the Board and CEO	March 14, 2012
Robert Zoellick	World Bank Group	President	May 16, 2012
Warren Buffett	Berkshire Hathaway	Chairman	June 5, 2012
Lloyd Blankfein	Goldman Sachs	Chairman & CEO	July 18, 2012
Michael Bloomberg	City of New York, New York; Bloomberg LP	Mayor; Founder	September 12, 2012
Alan Krueger	Council of Economic Advisers	Chairman	November 15, 2012
Frederick W. Smith	FedEx	Chairman, President and chief executive officer	December 6, 2012
Drew Gilpin Faust	Harvard University	President and Lincoln Professor of History	December 10, 2012
Mortimer Zuckerman	Boston Properties; New York Daily News; US News & World Report	Chairman and CEO; Publisher; chairman and Editor-in-Chief	February 8, 2013
Brian L. Roberts	Comcast	Chairman and CEO	March 21, 2013
Kenneth Chenault	The American Express Company	Chairman and chief executive officer	April 15, 2013
Katharine Weymouth	Washington Post	Publisher and CEO	May 2, 2013
Martin Baron	Washington Post	Executive Editor	May 2, 2013
Max Baucus	United States Senate	Senator from Montana	July 18, 2013
Dave Camp	United States House of Representatives	Representative from Michigan's 4th Congressional District	July 18, 2013
Valerie Jarrett		Senior Advisor to the President; Assistant to the President for Public Engagement and Intergovernmental Affairs	July 23, 2013
Jack Lew	United States Department of the Treasury	Secretary	September 17, 2013
James Gorman	Morgan Stanley	Chairman and CEO	September 18, 2013
Takeshi Uchiyamada	Toyota	Chairman of the Board	September 30, 2013
Ellen Kullman	DuPont	Chair of the Board and chief executive officer	October 10, 2013
Dr. Jim Yong Kim	World Bank Group	President	December 10, 2013
Sylvia Mathews Burwell	Office of Management & Budget	Director	March 11, 2014
Christopher J. Nassetta	Hilton Worldwide	President and CEO	March 20, 2014
Arne M. Sorenson	Marriott International	President and CEO	March 20, 2014
Wes Bush	Northrop Grumman	Chairman, CEO and President	April 17, 2014
Randall L. Stephenson	Business Roundtable; AT&T	Chairman; chairman and CEO	June 17, 2014
Francis S. Collins, M.D., Ph.D.	National Institutes of Health	Director	July 29, 2014
Jeffrey Zients	National Economic Council	Director; Assistant to the President for Economic Policy	September 30, 2014
Michael Milken	Milken Institute	Chairman	October 8, 2014
Christopher M. Crane	Exelon	President and chief executive officer	October 30, 2014
Ginni Rometty	IBM	Chairman, President and CEO	December 3, 2014
Donald Trump	The Trump Organization	Chairman and President	December 15, 2014
Michael Dell	Dell	Founder, chairman and CEO	March 4, 2015
Shaun Donovan	Office of Management & Budget	Director	March 11, 2015
Rex Tillerson	ExxonMobil	Chairman and CEO	March 12, 2015
Muriel Bowser	District of Columbia	Mayor	April 8, 2015
Jeff Immelt	General Electric	Chairman and CEO	June 17, 2015
James McNerney	Boeing	Chairman	July 29, 2015
Stephen A. Schwarzman	Blackstone Group	Chairman, CEO & Co-Founder	September 15, 2015
Michael Corbat	Citigroup	CEO	October 28, 2015
Dieter Zetsche	Daimler	Chairman of the Board of Management	November 5, 2015
Janet Yellen	Board of Governors of the Federal Reserve System	Chair	December 2, 2015
Anthony Fauci	National Institute of Allergy and Infectious Diseases	Director	January 29, 2016
Ash Carter	United States Department of Defense	Secretary	February 2, 2016
Ben Bernanke	Brookings Institution	Distinguished Fellow in Residence	February 10, 2016
Steve Case	Revolution	Chairman and CEO	April 12, 2016
Phebe Novakovic	General Dynamics	Chairman and CEO	May 18, 2016
Bob Dudley	BP	Group Chief Executive	June 23, 2016
Jamie Dimon	JPMorgan Chase	Chairman & CEO	September 12, 2016
Paul Ryan	United States House of Representatives	Speaker	September 28, 2016
William Clay Ford Jr	Ford	Executive Chairman	October 5, 2016
Doug Oberhelman	Caterpillar; Business Roundtable	Executive Chairman; Immediate Past Chair	February 9, 2017
Mary Barra	General Motors	Chairman and chief executive officer	February 28, 2017
John Watson	Chevron Corporation	Chairman of the Board and chief executive officer	March 23, 2017
Larry Fink	BlackRock	Chairman and chief executive officer	April 12, 2017
Adena Friedman	Nasdaq	President and chief executive officer	May 5, 2017
Juan Manuel Santos	Colombia	President	May 18, 2017
Juan Carlos Varela	Panama	President	June 20, 2017
Wilbur Ross	United States Department of Commerce	Secretary	July 25, 2017
Les Moonves	CBS Corporation	Chairman and CEO	September 7, 2017
Satya Nadella	Microsoft	Chief Executive Officer	October 4, 2017
Kwon Oh-hyun	Samsung Electronics	Vice Chairman & CEO	October 19, 2017
Lee Hsien Loong	Singapore	Prime Minister	October 23, 2017
Gary Cohn	National Economic Council	Director; Assistant to the President for Economic Policy	November 2, 2017
Steve Mollenkopf	Qualcomm	Chief Executive Officer	December 7, 2017
Steven Mnuchin	United States Department of the Treasury	Secretary	January 12, 2018
Dan Gilbert	Quicken Loans and Rock Ventures; Cleveland Cavaliers	Founder and chairman; Majority Owner	January 30, 2018
Brian Moynihan	Bank of America	Chairman of the Board and chief executive officer	February 15, 2018
Benjamin Netanyahu	State of Israel	Prime Minister	March 7, 2018
Marillyn Hewson	Lockheed Martin	Chairman, President and CEO	March 7, 2018
Dennis Muilenburg	Boeing	Chairman, President and chief executive officer	May 9, 2018
Oscar Munoz	United Airlines	Chief Executive Officer	June 7, 2018
Charlie Cook	Cook Political Report	Editor and Publisher	June 26, 2018
Paul Ryan	United States House of Representatives	Speaker	July 12, 2018
Larry Hogan	State of Maryland	Governor	August 2, 2018
Jeff Bezos	Amazon	CEO and Founder	September 13, 2018
Larry Kudlow	National Economic Council	Director; Assistant to the President for Economic Policy	October 4, 2018
Larry Merlo	CVS Health	President and chief executive officer	October 15, 2018
Juha Sipilä	Republic of Finland	Prime Minister	November 26, 2018
Kevin Plank	Under Armour	Founder, CEO and chairman of the Board	November 27, 2018
Jerome H. Powell	Board of Governors of the Federal Reserve System	Chairman	January 10, 2019
Nancy Pelosi	United States House of Representatives	Speaker	March 8, 2019
Akio Toyoda	Toyota	President, Member of the Board of Directors	March 15, 2019
Randall Stephenson	AT&T	Chairman and chief executive officer	March 20, 2019
Richard Trumka	AFL-CIO	President	April 23, 2019
Evan Greenberg	Chubb	Chairman and chief executive officer	April 24, 2019
Adam Silver	National Basketball Association	Commissioner	May 9, 2019
Dara Khosrowshahi	Uber	Chief Executive Officer	June 11, 2019
Bill Gates	Breakthrough Energy Ventures	Chair of the Board	June 24, 2019
Mike Pompeo	United States Department of State	Secretary of State	July 29, 2019
Ed Bastian	Delta Air Lines	Chief Executive Officer	September 17, 2019
Marc Benioff	Salesforce.com	Founder, Chairman & Co-CEO	October 18, 2019
David Rubenstein	Carlyle Group	Co-Founder & Co-Executive Chairman	October 28, 2019
Ola Källenius	Daimler & Mercedes-Benz	Chairman of the Board of Management	January 10, 2020
Kaywin Feldman	National Gallery of Art	Director	February 24, 2020
Carla Hayden	Library of Congress	Librarian of Congress	February 24, 2020
Deborah Rutter	John F. Kennedy Center for the Performing Arts	President	February 24, 2020
Charlie Cook	Cook Political Report	Editor and Publisher	March 11, 2020
Sylvia Mathews Burwell	American University	President	March 13, 2020
David Skorton	Association of American Medical Colleges	President and CEO	March 13, 2020
Jo Ann Jenkins	AARP	CEO	March 13, 2020
Peter L. Scher	JPMorgan Chase	Vice Chairman	March 13, 2020
Roger Krone	Leidos	CEO	March 13, 2020
Matt Kelly	JBG Smith	CEO	March 13, 2020
Paul Rothman	Johns Hopkins School of Medicine	CEO	March 27, 2020
Lisa Maragakis	Johns Hopkins School of Medicine	Senior Director of Infection Prevention	March 27, 2020
Lauren Sauer	Johns Hopkins School of Medicine	Assistant Professor, Department of Emergency Medicine	March 27, 2020
Dr. J. Stephen Jones	Inova Health System	President and CEO	April 3, 2020
Kenneth A. Samet	MedStar Health	President and CEO	April 3, 2020
Gina Adams	FedEx	Senior Vice President, Government and Regulatory Affairs	April 3, 2020
Jane Adams	Johnson & Johnson	Vice President, US Federal Government Affairs	April 3, 2020
Everett Eissenstat	General Motors	Senior Vice President, Global Public Policy	April 3, 2020
Adena Friedman	Nasdaq, Inc.	President and CEO	April 8, 2020
Dr. Kurt Newman	Children's National Hospital	President and CEO	April 8, 2020
Ted Gayer	Brookings Institution	Executive Vice President	April 8, 2020
Jason Thomas	Carlyle Group	Managing Director	April 8, 2020
Larry Hogan	State of Maryland	Governor	April 17, 2020
Ted Leonsis	Monumental Sports and Entertainment	Owner	April 17, 2020
Kim R. Ford	Martha's Table	President and CEO	April 17, 2020
Muriel Bowser	District of Columbia	Mayor	April 24, 2020
Ambassador Ashok Kumar Mirpuri	Embassy of Singapore	Ambassador of Singapore to the United States	April 24, 2020
Suzanne P. Clark	United States Chamber of Commerce	President	April 24, 2020
Anthony Fauci	National Institute of Allergy and Infectious Diseases	Director	April 28, 2020
Arne M. Sorenson	Marriott International	President and CEO	April 28, 2020
Rosie Allen-Herring	United Way of the National Capital Area	President and CEO	April 28, 2020
John J. DeGioia	Georgetown University	President	May 1, 2020
Richard J. Pollack	American Hospital Association	President and CEO	May 1, 2020
Dr. David J. Skorton	Association of American Medical Colleges	President and CEO	May 1, 2020
Gail J. McGovern	American Red Cross	President and CEO	May 1, 2020
Mark Warner	United States Senate	Senator from Virginia	May 8, 2020
José Andrés	World Central Kitchen	Founder	May 8, 2020
Schroeder Stribling	N Street Village	Chief Executive Officer	May 8, 2020
Mark Penn	The Harris Poll	Chairman	May 12, 2020
Richard Ashworth	Walgreens	President	May 15, 2020
Gretchen Van derVeer	Fair Chance	Chief Executive Officer	May 15, 2020
Wayne A. I. Frederick	Howard University	President	May 15, 2020
Dr. Kurt Newman	Children's National Hospital	President and CEO	May 15, 2020
Dr. Francis S. Collins	National Institutes of Health	Director	May 29, 2020
Christopher J. Nassetta	Hilton Worldwide	President and Chief Executive Officer	May 29, 2020
Mary C. Brady	Economic Club of Washington	Executive Director	May 29, 2020
Ralph Northam	Commonwealth of Virginia	Governor	June 12, 2020
Steven Collis	AmerisourceBergen	Chairman, President, and Chief Executive Officer	June 12, 2020
Ralph F. Boyd Jr.	So Others Might Eat (SOME)	President and CEO	June 12, 2020
Lonnie Bunch	Smithsonian Institution	Secretary	June 12, 2020
Wes Moore	Robin Hood Foundation	CEO	June 18, 2020
Muriel Bowser	District of Columbia	Mayor	June 18, 2020
George Lambert	Greater Washington Urban League	President and CEO	June 18, 2020
Michael Neidorff	Centene Corporation	Chairman, President and CEO	June 23, 2020
Timothy Sands	Virginia Tech	President	June 23, 2020
Philip D.M. de Piciotto	Octagon	Founder and President	June 23, 2020
Mark Ein	Washington Open	Chairman and CEO	June 23, 2020
Guylaine Saint Juste	Year Up	Managing Director	June 23, 2020
Nicole Quiroga	Greater Washington Hispanic Chamber of Commerce	President and CEO	July 8, 2020
Hans Vestberg	Verizon Communications	Chairman and Chief Executive Officer	July 8, 2020
Dr. Richard J. McCarthy	Kaiser Permanente Mid-Atlantic States	Executive Medical Director	July 8, 2020
Dr. Mark McClellan	Duke-Margolis Center for Health Policy at Duke University	Policy Director	July 29, 2020
Ashish Jha	Harvard Global Health Institute	Director	July 29, 2020
Gabrielle Webster	Boys & Girls Club of Greater Washington	President and CEO	July 29, 2020
David Rubenstein	Carlyle Group	Co-Founder & Co-Executive Chairman	September 2, 2020
Dr. Stephen M Hahn	Food & Drug Administration	Commissioner of Food and Drugs	September 10, 2020
Stanley C. Erck	Novavax	President and Chief Executive Officer	September 10, 2020
Louis DeJoy	United States Postal Service	Postmaster General	September 24, 2020
Donald Trump	45th President of the United States	President of the United States	October 14, 2020
Mike Allen	Axios Media	Founder and Executive Director	October 21, 2020
Gloria Borger	CNN	Chief Political Analyst	October 21, 2020
Charlie Cook	Cook Political Report	Editor and Publisher	October 21, 2020
Nikole Killion	CBS News	Correspondent	October 21, 2020
Robert Bauer	New York University School of Law	Distinguished Scholar in Residence	October 28, 2020
Benjamin Ginsberg	CNN	Commentator	October 28, 2020
Ron Dermer	Embassy of Israel	Ambassador of Israel to the United States	November 16, 2020
Yousef Al Otaiba	Embassy of the United Arab Emirates	Ambassador of the United Arab Emirates to the United States	November 16, 2020
Abdulla R. Al Khalifa	Embassy of the Kingdom of Bahrain	Ambassador of the Kingdom of Bahrain to the United States	November 16, 2020
Alex Gorsky	Johnson & Johnson	Chairman of the Board and Chief Executive Officer	November 18, 2020
Julie Sweet	Accenture	Chief Executive Officer	December 9, 2020
Anthony Fauci	National Institute of Allergy and Infectious Diseases	Director	January 6, 2021
Debbie Dingell	United States House of Representatives	Representative for Michigan's 12th Congressional District	January 27, 2021
Tom Reed	United States House of Representatives	Representative for New York's 23rd Congressional District	January 27, 2021
Kimberly K. Horn	Kaiser Permanente	Executive Vice President and Group President, Markets Outside of California	January 27, 2021
Dr. J. Stephen Jones	Inova Health System	President and CEO	January 27, 2021
Kenneth A. Samet	MedStar Health	President and CEO	January 27, 2021
Kenneth Frazier	Merck & Company	Chairman of the Board and Chief Executive Officer	February 17, 2021
Mike Roman	3M	Chairman and Chief Executive Officer	March 17, 2021
Gregory J. Hayes	Raytheon Technologies	Chief Executive Officer	April 7, 2021
Jerome Powell	Board of Governors of the Federal Reserve System	Chairman	April 14, 2021
Muriel Bowser	District of Columbia	Mayor	May 13, 2021
Dr. Rochelle Walensky	Centers for Disease Control and Prevention	Director	May 13, 2021
Mellody Hobson	Ariel Investments	Co-CEO & President	May 25, 2021
John Stankey	AT&T	CEO	June 10, 2021
Scott Kirby	United Airlines	Chief Executive Officer	July 13, 2021
Pete Buttigieg	United States Department of Transportation	United States Secretary of Transportation	July 20, 2021
Gina Raimondo	United States Department of Commerce	United States Secretary of Commerce	September 28, 2021
Joseph Manchin III	United States Senate	United States Senator for West Virginia	October 26, 2021
David Rubenstein	Carlyle Group	Co-Founder & Co-Executive Chairman	November 9, 2021
Pat Gelsinger	Intel Corporation	Chief Executive Officer	December 9, 2021
Jason Wright	Washington Commanders	President	February 3, 2022
Robert Allbritton	Politico	Founder & Publisher	February 14, 2022
Ronald A. Klain	United States Government	White House Chief of Staff	March 2, 2022
Jake Sullivan	National Security Affairs	Assistant to the President	April 14, 2022
Marek Magierowski	Embassy of Poland	Ambassador of Poland to the United States	April 20, 2022
Kathy Warden	Northrop Grumman	CEO and President	May 4, 2022
Kurt Newman	Children's National Hospital	CEO and President	May 17, 2022
Lawrence Bacow	Harvard University	President	May 18, 2022
Anthony Capuano	Marriott International	CEO	June 23, 2022
Mike Sievert	T-Mobile	CEO	July 13, 2022
H.E Emily Harber	Embassy of Germany	Ambassador of the Federal Republic of Germany to the United States	September 13, 2022
The Honorable Brian Deese	National Economic Council	President & Director	September 27, 2022
David Rubenstein	Carlyle Group	Co-Founder & Co-Executive Chairman	October 3, 2022
Steve Case	Revolution & AOL	CEO &Co-Founder	October 3, 2022
Mike Allen	Axios	Co-Founder	November 14, 2022
Nikole Killion	CBS News	Congressional Correspondent	November 14, 2022
Kasie Hunt	CNN Worldwide	Anchor & Chief National Affairs Analyst	November 14, 2022
Bret Baier	Fox News	Chief Political Anchor	November 14, 2022
Charlie Cook	Cook Political Report	Founder & Contributor	November 14, 2022
Rosalind Brewer	Walgreens Boots Alliance	CEO	December 7, 2022
Philippe Étienne	Embassy of France	Ambassador of France to the United States	December 8, 2022
Karen Pierce	Embassy of the United Kingdom	Ambassador of the United Kingdom to the United States	January 12, 2023
Jerome Powell	Board of Governors of the Federal Reserve System	Chairman	February 7, 2023
Robin Hayes	JetBlue	CEO	February 21, 2023
Jane Fraser	Citigroup	CEO	March 22, 2023
Tamika Tremaglio	National Basketball Players Association	Executive Director	April 5, 2023
D. Steve Boland	Bank of America	Chief Administrative Officer	April 20, 2023
Nasir Qadree	Zeal Capital	Founder	April 20, 2023
Bernard Looney	BP	CEO	May 10, 2023
Patrick Kennedy	The Kennedy Forum	Founder	May 18, 2023
Robert E. Rubin	United States Department of the Treasury	United States Secretary of Treasury	July 19, 2023
Josh Harris	Washington Commanders	Managing partner	September 6, 2023
Mitchell Rales	Washington Commanders	Limited partner	September 6, 2023
Eric Gertler	U.S. News & World Report	Executive Chairman and CEO	September 13, 2023
Walter Isaacson	Tulane University	Professor	September 19, 2023
Glenn Youngkin	Commonwealth of Virginia	Governor	September 26, 2023
Carol B. Tomé	United Parcel Service	CEO	November 8, 2023
Bill Anderson	Bayer AG	CEO	November 16, 2023
Mary Barra	General Motors	Chair and CEO	December 13, 2023
Sheila Johnson	Salamander Collection	Founder and CEO	January 4, 2024
Jacques Pitteloud	Embassy of Switzerland	Ambassador of Switzerland to the United States	January 8, 2024
Thomas Barkin	Federal Reserve Bank of Richmond	President and CEO	February 7, 2024
Enrique Lores	HP Inc.	President and CEO	February 8, 2024
Wes Moore	Maryland	Governor	February 21, 2024
Spencer Cox	Utah	Governor	February 21, 2024
Marc Rowan	Apollo Global Management	Co-Founder and CEO	February 27, 2024
Mollie Marcoux	Ladies Professional Golf Association	Commissioner	March 25, 2024
Jeff Zients	United States Government	White House Chief of Staff	April 18, 2024
David Rubenstein	Baltimore Orioles; The Carlyle Group	Co-Owner; Co-Founder and Co-Chairman of the Board	April 30, 2024
Cal Ripken Jr.	Baltimore Orioles	Minority Owner; Baseball Hall of Famer	April 30, 2024
Gan Kim Yong	Singapore	Minister for Trade and Industry	May 1, 2024
Alejandro Mayorkas	United States Department of Homeland Security	Secretary	May 17, 2024
Garry Tan	Y Combinator	President and CEO	May 22, 2024
Robin Vince	BNY	President and CEO	July 9, 2024
Jerome Powell	Board of Governors of the Federal Reserve System	Chairman	July 15, 2024
David Rubenstein	The Carlyle Group	Co-Founder and Co-Chairman of the Board	September 9, 2024
James G. Stavridis	The Carlyle Group	Vice Chair, Global Affairs and Partner	September 9, 2024
Allison Barber	Indiana Fever	President and COO	September 19, 2024
Joe Biden	46th President of the United States	President of the United States	September 19, 2024
Nicole Killian	CBS News	Congressional Correspondent	October 21, 2024
Kasie Hunt	CNN	Anchor and Chief National Affairs Analyst	October 21, 2024
Ben Smith	Semafor	Co-Founder and Editor-in-Chief	October 21, 2024
Amy Walter	The Cook Political Report with Amy Walter	Publisher and Editor-in-Chief	October 21, 2024
Peter Baker	The New York Times	Chief White House Correspondent	October 21, 2024
David A. Ricks	Eli Lilly and Company	Chair and Chief Executive Officer	December 10, 2024
Brian Moynihan	Bank of America	Chair of the Board and Chief Executive Officer	February 25, 2025
Ajay Banga	World Bank Group	President	March 20, 2025
David Cordani	The Cigna Group	Chairman and Chief Executive Officer	March 26, 2025
Jason Smith	United States House of Representatives Committee on Ways and Means	Chairman; Representative for Missouri's 8th Congressional District	May 15, 2025
Mark Clouse	Washington Commanders	President	May 19, 2025
Vicki Hollub	Occidental	President and CEO	June 16, 2025
Yasir Al-Rumayyan	Public Investment Fund	Governor	September 8, 2025
Edward H. Bastian	Delta Air Lines	Chief Executive Officer	September 10, 2025
Kirsten Hillman	Embassy of Canada	Ambassador of Canada to the United States	September 17, 2025
David M. Solomon	Goldman Sachs	Chairman of the Board of Directors and Chief Executive Officer	October 30, 2025
Kevin Hassett	National Economic Council	Director	November 12, 2025
Michael Arougheti	Ares Management and Baltimore Orioles	Co-Founder, Chief Executive Officer, and Director; Co-Owner	January 6, 2026
Cal Ripken Jr.	Baltimore Orioles	Minority Owner; Baseball Hall of Famer	January 6, 2026
Mike Elias	Baltimore Orioles	President of Baseball Operations and General Manager	January 6, 2026
Catie Griggs	Baltimore Orioles	President of Business Operations	January 6, 2026
Craig Albernaz	Baltimore Orioles	Manager	January 6, 2026
Jeremy Allaire	Circle	Co-Founder, Chief Executive Officer, and Chairman	January 15, 2026
