= SnagFilms =

Former website about documentary and independent films

- Website type: Video on demand
- Available in: English
- Founded: July 2008
- Dissolved: May 2020
- Headquarters: Washington, D.C.
- Country of origin: United States
- Key people: Ted Leonsis
- Current status: Defunct

SnagFilms was a website that offered advertising-supported documentary and independent films. Films were streamed on the website, which contained a library of over 5,000 films. Filmmakers could submit documentaries for consideration as well. The site included documentary films produced by National Geographic and titles such as Super Size Me, The Good Son: The Life of Ray Boom Boom Mancini, Kicking It, Cracked Not Broken and Nanking.

== History ==
SnagFilms was launched in July 2008 by Internet pioneer Ted Leonsis. Venture capitalist Miles Gilburne and Revolution LLC chairman Steve Case are also investors in the start-up. While at AOL Leonsis founded True Stories, an online source for documentaries. That website would become the inspiration for SnagFilms.

SnagFilms owns comedy website Thundershorts, which The New York Times called "a discriminating boutique." SnagFilms previously owned IndieWire, an online publication covering the independent film industry.

SnagFilms’ curated collection is viewed on its own site and a digital network of more than 110,000 affiliated sites and webpages worldwide, including partners such as Comcast's XfinityTV.com, Hulu, IMDb, AOL/Huffington Post, hundreds of non-profits, special interest sites and blogs – and via its applications for tablets, including Apple's iPad (AirPlay-enabled), Amazon's Kindle Fire and other Android-based tablets; Android smartphones; OTT platforms Roku and Boxee; and soon to launch on connected TVs from Sony, Samsung and Vizio. SnagFilms’ titles have been featured on more than 3.5 billion pageviews across its network.

SnagFilms added IMDb and YouTube as exhibitors of its content. In the summer of 2010, SnagFilms announced a partnership with Comcast's video on demands channels and Verizon FiOS TV. In Spring 2011, SnagFilms launched a channel on Roku and became available on Boxee's internet platform. In late 2011, Snag became available on the Kindle Fire as well as many BlackBerry and Android tablets and smartphones. Their films are also available on iTunes, Amazon.com, DIRECTV and digital streaming providers VUDU, Samsung Media Hub, Xbox Live and the PlayStation Network.

SnagFilms was named one of the fastest-growing technology companies in the Washington, D.C., area. Gizmodo has named SnagFilms as a “Best iPad App,” OVGuide has twice named SnagFilms a Top Site, and MovieMaker Magazine named SnagFilms to its annual list of “50 Best Websites for Moviemakers.” SnagFilms, Inc. was named as one of Red Herring's 2013 Top-100 Technology Companies in North America. Snagfilms.com was a Webby finalist as 2014's top entertainment site and a 2013 Webby Honoree.

According to their homepage, "With deep regret, we have shut down the SnagFilms service, and by the end of May [2020] will be wrapping up our relationships with the filmmakers, production companies and other content owners we have been honored to serve for more than a decade."
