= Jason Wright =

American business consultant (born 1982)

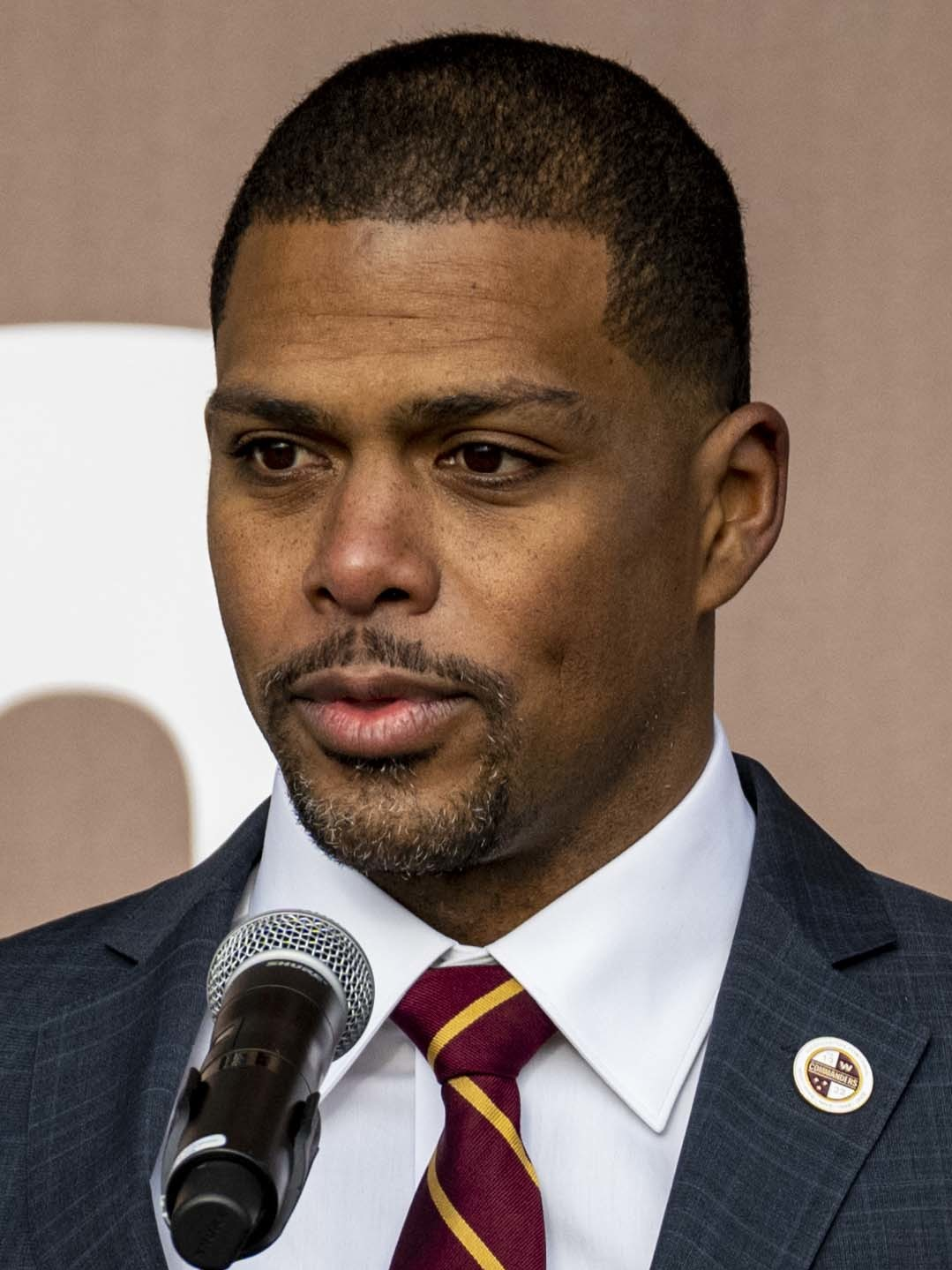
- Wright in 2022

Personal information
- Born: July 12, 1982 (age 44); Upland, California, U.S.
- Listed height: 5 ft 10 in (1.78 m)
- Listed weight: 212 lb (96 kg)

Career information
- High school: Diamond Bar (Diamond Bar, California)
- College: Northwestern (2000–2003)
- NFL draft: 2004: undrafted

Career history

Playing
- San Francisco 49ers (2004)*; Atlanta Falcons (2004–2005); Cleveland Browns (2005–2008); Arizona Cardinals (2009–2010)
- * Offseason or practice squad member only

Operations
- Washington Football Team / Commanders (2020–2024); President

Awards and highlights
- Bobby Bowden Award (2003); 2003 Motor City Bowl co-MVP; Second-team All-Big Ten (2003)

Career NFL statistics
- Games played: 80
- Carries: 168
- Rushing yards: 633
- Rushing touchdowns: 2
- Receptions: 72
- Receiving yards: 581
- Receiving touchdowns: 3
- Stats at Pro Football Reference

Jason Gomillion Wright (born July 12, 1982) is an American business consultant and former professional football player. Wright attended Northwestern University in the early 2000s and played running back for the Wildcats while earning a degree in psychology. He played as a reserve running back and special teamer in the National Football League (NFL) for the Atlanta Falcons, Cleveland Browns, and Arizona Cardinals. He additionally served as the NFLPA representative for the Cardinals during the 2011 NFL lockout before retiring.

Wright graduated with a Master of Business Administration degree from the University of Chicago Booth School of Business. He moved to Washington, D.C., in 2013 and began work for the management consulting firm McKinsey & Company advising companies on workplace culture. Wright, the first black president of an NFL franchise, served as Washington Commanders team president from August 2020 to July 2024. He is also a business partner with the Union Theological Seminary, Greater Washington Partnership, and The Economic Club of Washington, D.C.

== Early life and college ==
Wright was born on July 12, 1982, in Upland, California, and grew up in Pomona. He attended Diamond Bar High School in Diamond Bar, California, where he lettered in football and track before earning a football scholarship at Northwestern University. He enrolled there in 2000 and played for the Northwestern Wildcats football team originally as a wide receiver before switching to running back. In August 2001, a teammate at Northwestern, Rashidi Wheeler, died from an asthma attack during practice. Wright later cited the event as a "transformative experience" that strengthened his faith in Christianity.

Wright was named co-MVP of the 2003 Motor City Bowl after rushing for 237 yards on 21 carries, and was also named to the 2003 All-Big Ten Conference football team. He finished his Northwestern career with 32 touchdowns on 487 carries and 577 yards and two touchdowns on 54 receptions. He also returned 31 kickoffs for 828 yards and a touchdown. He left as Northwestern's fourth all-time leading rusher with 2,625 yards, the third all-purpose yards leader with 4,030 yards, and the fourth leading scorer with 210 points.

Wright graduated with Bachelor of Arts degree in psychology from the school's Weinberg College of Arts and Sciences. He was also a member of the Alpha Phi Alpha fraternity and was president of the school's Fellowship of Christian Athletes chapter, being named the inaugural recipient of the Bobby Bowden Award by the latter in 2003.

== NFL playing career ==
Wright attended the NFL Combine but went unselected in the 2004 NFL draft. He signed with the San Francisco 49ers after the draft but was released as a part of the team's final roster cuts prior to the regular season. Wright then signed with the practice squad of the Atlanta Falcons, being released and re-signed several times during his tenure there. He was elevated to the active roster in December 2004 and appeared in two games before signed with the Cleveland Browns during the 2005 offseason, scoring his first NFL touchdown in a game against the Tennessee Titans that year.

Wright played for the Browns for three seasons as a backup and third-down back behind Reuben Droughns and Jamal Lewis until signing a two-year, US$2 million contract with the Arizona Cardinals in 2009. He served as a team captain with Arizona and was their NFLPA representative during the 2011 NFL lockout before retiring in July. Wright finished his NFL career with 168 rushes for 633 yards and 2 touchdowns along with 72 receptions for 581 yards and 3 touchdowns.

== Business career ==
Following his playing career, Wright enrolled at the University of Chicago Booth School of Business and graduated with a Master of Business Administration (MBA) degree in operations and finance in 2013. Later that year he became a consultant for the management consulting firm McKinsey & Company where he advised companies on organizational culture, workplace diversity, and failure at organizational branding and historical honorifics.

Wright has served on the board of trustees for the Union Theological Seminary in New York since 2017, and as co-chair with Sheila Johnson on the Greater Washington Partnership's Inclusive Growth Strategy Council since 2021. He is also a member of The Economic Club of Washington, D.C., and spoke at an event in February 2022.

=== Washington Football Team / Commanders ===
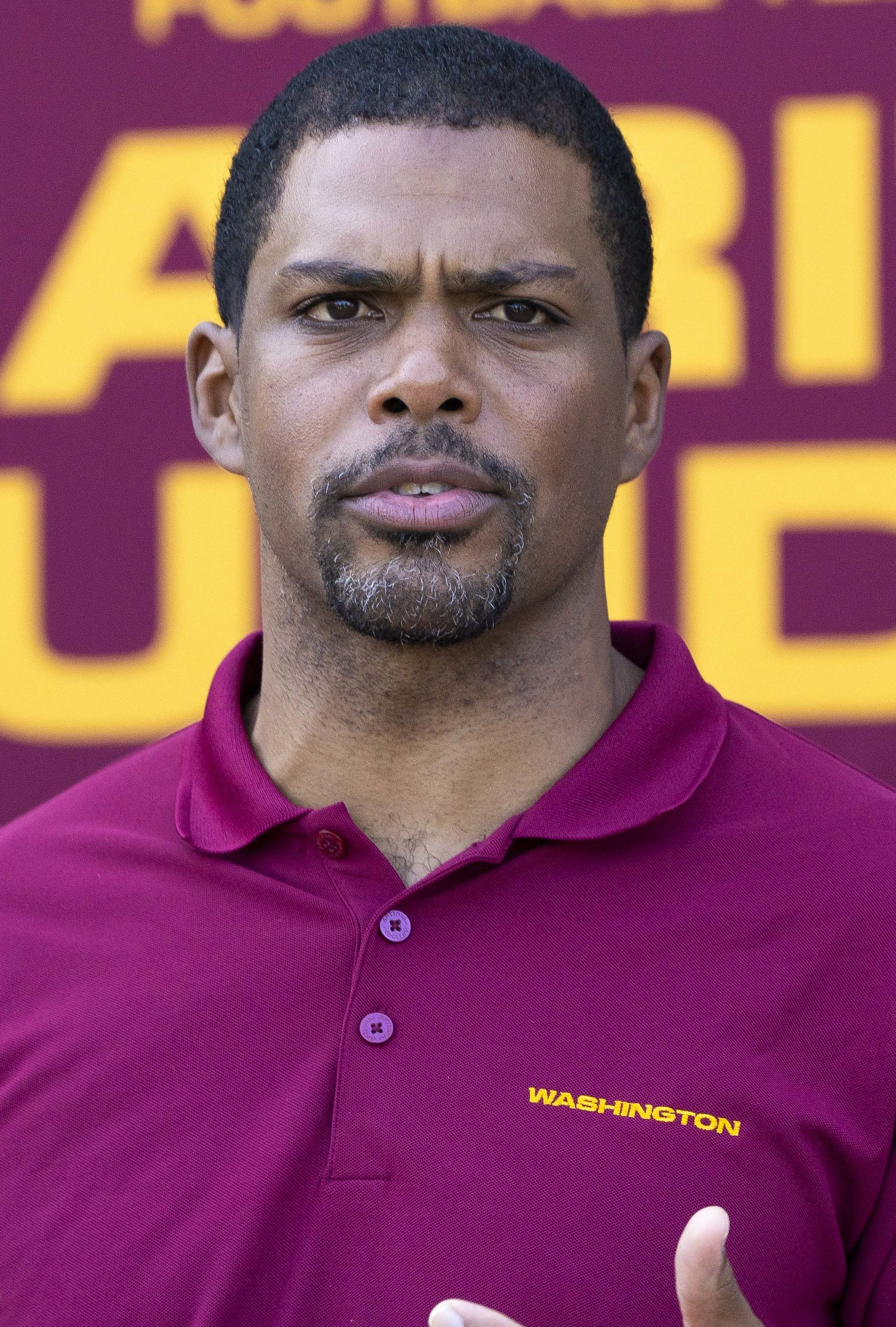
Wright as Washington Football Team president, 2021

In August 2020, Wright was hired by the Washington Football Team as their team president to lead their business operations, financing, and marketing. The move made him the first black president of an NFL team in history, as well as the youngest active one at the time of his hiring. Additionally, he is only the fourth former player to be president of an NFL team. Wright helped lead the franchise during their controversial rebranding process to become the Commanders in 2022, a name which drew mixed reviews from fans and media. In 2024, Wright was regarded as a finalist to succeed Mark Murphy as president and CEO of the Green Bay Packers. He stepped down as Commanders' president in July 2024 and remained as a senior adviser with the team until the end of the season.

== Personal life ==
Wright's family has a history with civil rights. His great-great uncle, Charles Gomillion, was a Tuskegee University professor and the plaintiff in Gomillion v. Lightfoot, a landmark 1960 US Supreme Court case regarding voting rights that became instrumental in the Voting Rights Act of 1965. Wright was given the middle name Gomillion in honor of him. His paternal grandfather, Harvey Wright, was also an educator and activist who started several NAACP chapters in Texas. Wright's sister Allison is a public defender in Massachusetts.

Wright married Tiffany Braxton in 2007; the two met as students at Northwestern. He is close friends with Michael Blake, a fellow Northwestern graduate who later served as the Vice Chair of the Democratic National Committee from 2017 to 2021. Blake served as an advisor during Wright's transition as Commanders president in the early 2020s. Wright was the recipient of the "Best Hire of 2020" award by the Sports Business Journal and was named to Black Enterprise's "Top 40 under 40" list in 2021.
