= Sheila Johnson =

American businesswoman (born 1949)

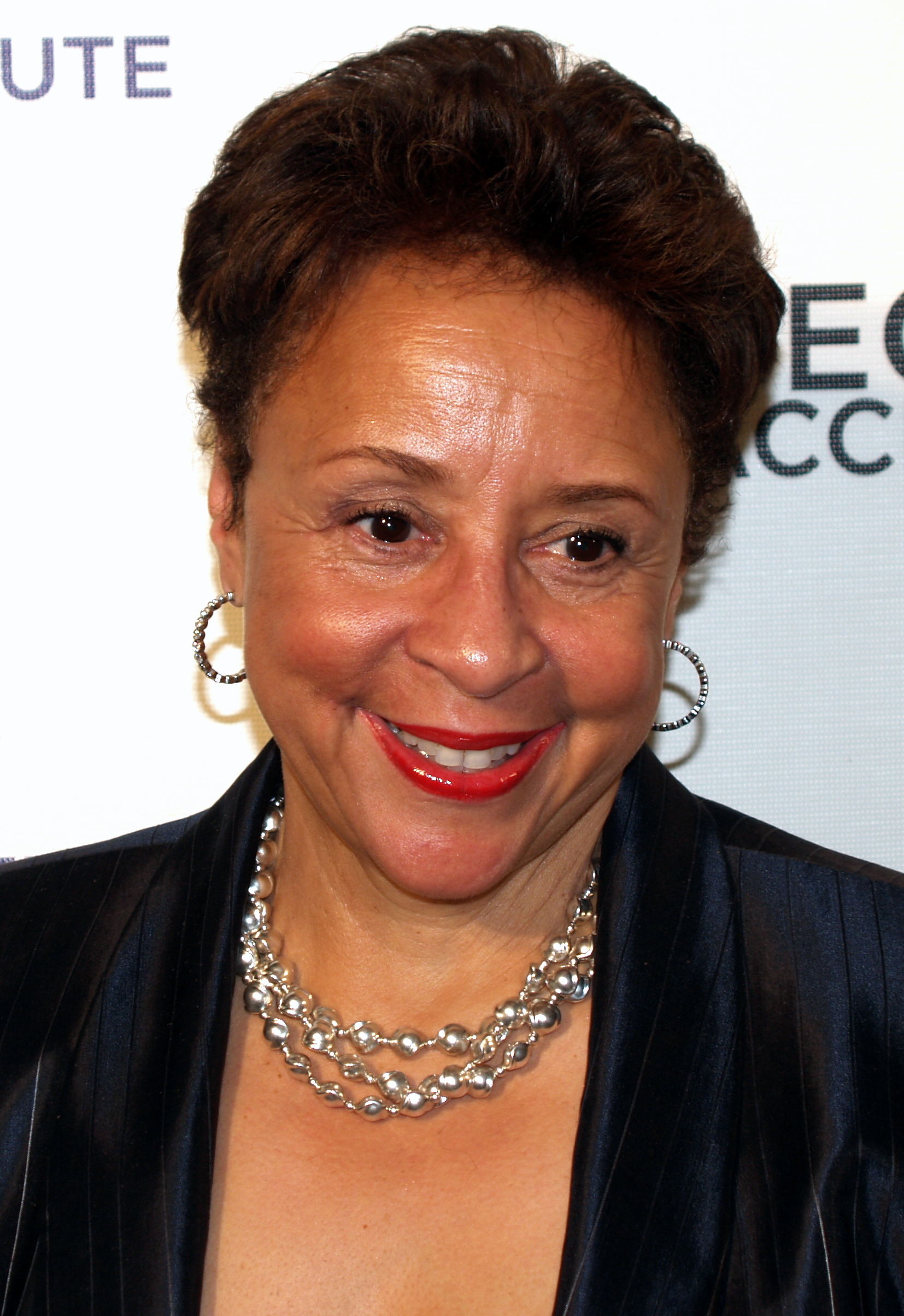
- Johnson in 2008
- Born: Sheila Crump; January 25, 1949 (age 77); McKeesport, Pennsylvania, U.S.
- Education: University of Illinois, Urbana-Champaign (BA)
- Occupations: Entrepreneur; philanthropist
- Years active: 1979–present
- Known for: Co-founding BET
- Title: Vice chairwoman, Monumental Sports & Entertainment
- Spouses: Robert L. Johnson (m. 1969; div. 2002) William Newman (m. 2005; died 2026)
- Children: 2

Sheila Crump Johnson (born January 25, 1949) is an American businesswoman, who co-founded BET and is the CEO of Salamander Hotels and Resorts. In 2001, she became the first Black female billionaire after the purchase of BET by Viacom.

Johnson is a vice chairman and partner of Monumental Sports & Entertainment, a professional sports holding company which manages the Washington Capitals (NHL), the Washington Wizards (NBA), and the Washington Mystics (WNBA). Johnson is CEO of Salamander Hospitality, a company she founded in 2005. Salamander's portfolio includes: Reunion Resort in Reunion, Florida, The Innisbrook Resort and Golf Club, a 900-acre (3.6 km^{2}), 72 hole PGA tour golf course in Palm Harbor, FL, Hotel Bennett in Charleston, South Carolina; Half Moon in Montego Bay, Jamaica; Aurora Anguilla in British West Indies; and The Salamander Resort & Spa in the Blue Ridge Mountains in Middleburg, Virginia.

== Early life ==
Sheila Johnson was born on January 25, 1949, in McKeesport, Pennsylvania, the daughter of a neurosurgeon father who worked for the Veterans Administration and an accountant mother. She has a younger brother, George.

She attended Proviso East High School in Maywood, Illinois, and graduated from the University of Illinois, Urbana-Champaign.

== Career ==
Johnson, along with her first husband, Robert, co-founded the cable TV channel Black Entertainment Television (BET) in 1979. Viacom bought the company in 1999 for $3 billion.

In 2002, she sold her BET shares and used it to invest in hotels, real estate, and horses. Johnson founded Salamander Hotels and Resorts in 2005. She has a principal shareholder stake in Monumental Sports & Entertainment, a professional sports holding company that manages the Washington Capitals (NHL), the Washington Wizards (NBA), and the Washington Mystics (WNBA).

== Philanthropy ==
Johnson is a Global Ambassador for CARE, a humanitarian organization fighting global poverty. Her initiative called Sheila's I Am Powerful Challenge was created to support the empowerment of women in fighting poverty and it raised over $8 million in 2007. She serves as chair of the Board of Governors of Parsons The New School for Design in New York and funded the opening of the Sheila C. Johnson Design Center, combining classrooms, public program spaces, and galleries. She sits on the boards of VH1's Save the Music Foundation, Americans for the Arts, the School of Education and Human Development Foundation (formerly the Curry School of Education) at the University of Virginia, and the University of Illinois Foundation. Johnson is also the Ambassador for the Healthy Site Institute, a member of the Council on Foreign Relations, and a member of Sigma Alpha Iota music fraternity. Johnson founded the Sheila C. Johnson Center for Clinical Services at the University of Virginia.

== Film ==
Johnson's first film, Kicking It, premiered at the 2008 Sundance Film Festival in Park City, Utah. She served as one of 237 executive producers on her second film, A Powerful Noise, which premiered at the 2008 Tribeca Film Festival in New York.

== Personal life ==
From 1969 to 2002, Johnson was married to Robert L. Johnson. They have two children.

On September 24, 2005, she married Arlington County Circuit Court Chief Judge William T. Newman, who had presided over her 2002 divorce. The couple first met three decades earlier when they acted in a play together. Newman died on February 10, 2026.

In 2007, Johnson was honored as one of the Library of Virginia's "Virginia Women in History" for her career and her contributions to society.

In April 2021, Johnson, along with Washington Commanders team president, Jason Wright, formed the Inclusive Growth Strategy Council within the Greater Washington Partnership.

== Awards ==
Recognized as an Eleanor Roosevelt Val-Kill Medalist in 2012, Johnson was honored as an individual whose far-reaching influence has left an impact on the global community through "education, advocacy, social justice, and civil and human rights".

In 2018, she received the Lincoln Medal given by Ford's Theatre Society to those who, through their body of work, accomplishments, or personal attributes, exemplify the lasting legacy and mettle of character embodied by Abraham Lincoln. In 2019, The Lincoln Academy of Illinois granted Johnson the Order of Lincoln award, the highest honor bestowed by the State of Illinois. That same year, the Women's Sports Foundation honored Johnson with the Billie Jean King Leadership Award.

== Works ==
- Walk through Fire: A Memoir of Love, Loss, and Triumph. Simon & Schuster. 2024

== See also ==
- List of speakers at The Economic Club of Washington, D.C.
