= Mark Clouse =

American businessman (born c. 1968)

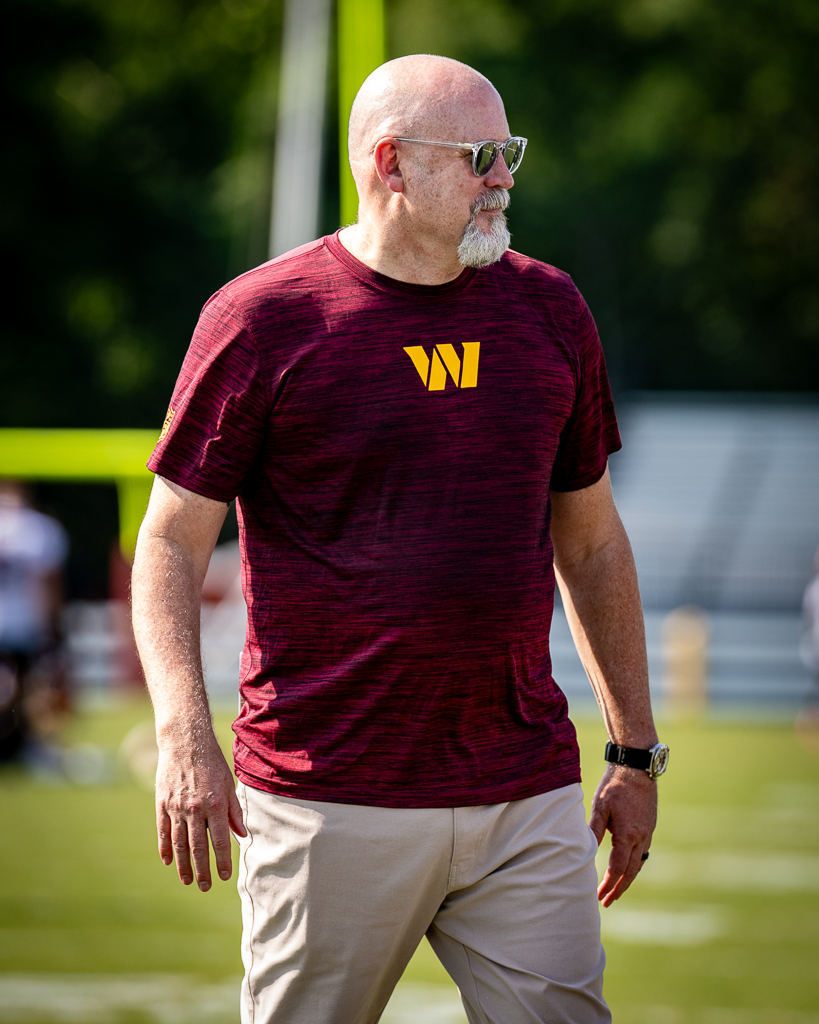
- Clouse as Washington Commanders president, 2025

Washington Commanders
- Title: President

Personal information
- Born: c. 1968; Cincinnati, Ohio, U.S.

Career information
- Position: Guard (basketball)
- High school: Northwest (Cincinnati)
- College: Army (1986–1988)

Career history
- Pinnacle Foods (2016–2019); CEO; Campbell's (2019–2024); President/CEO; Washington Commanders (2025–present); President

Other information
- Military career
- Branch: United States Army
- Service years: 1990–1996
- Rank: Captain

Mark Alan Clouse (born c. 1968) is an American businessman who is the president of the Washington Commanders of the National Football League (NFL). Clouse attended the United States Military Academy (USMA) from 1986 to 1990, playing two seasons of college basketball as a guard for the Army Black Knights before becoming a helicopter pilot and reaching the rank of captain before retiring in 1996.

Clouse joined the marketing department of Kraft Foods upon leaving the military, later working as an executive at Mondelez International then CEO of Pinnacle Foods in the late 2010s and Campbell's in the early 2020s. He retired from the food industry in 2025 and became the team president of the Commanders. Clouse has also been a board member of Brown-Forman since 2022.

== Early life and military career ==
Clouse was born c. 1968 in Cincinnati, Ohio, later graduating from Northwest High School in 1986. He attended the United States Military Academy in West Point, New York, playing two seasons as a guard and captain for the Army Black Knights basketball team until a case of frostbite while stationed in Alaska affected his athleticism. Clouse graduated with Bachelor of Science degree in economics in 1990. He was a helicopter pilot in the United States Army for six and a half years, rising to the rank of captain before retiring in 1996.

== Business career ==
=== Food industry (1996–2024) ===
Clouse joined the marketing department of Kraft Foods in 1996. He was president of Kraft Foods Greater China from 2006 to 2008. He was managing director of Kraft Foods Brazil from 2008 to 2010. He was appointed senior vice president of the Biscuits Global Category in 2010 and promoted to president of Kraft's Snacks and Confectionery division the following year. Kraft Foods split into two companies, an international snack food company and a North American grocery company, Mondelez International, with Clouse named its executive vice president. He was appointed to Chief Growth Officer in July 2014. In January 2016, he was promoted to Chief Commercial Officer, with oversight of the execution of the company's commercial growth plan globally. Clouse was hired as CEO of Pinnacle Foods in May 2016. He steered the company to being acquired by Conagra in October 2018 for $8.1 billion and stepped down after Pinnacle ceased being publicly traded. In January 2019, Clouse was appointed as president and CEO of Campbell's.

=== Washington Commanders (2025–present) ===
Clouse announced his retirement from Campbell's in December 2024 to be president of the Washington Commanders, an American football team belonging to the National Football League (NFL). His term began in February 2025, with him managing the franchise's business operations.

== Personal life ==
Clouse met his wife Kathy McLeod, a former teacher, while stationed at Fort Irwin in Barstow, California; the couple married in 1995 and have two sons. He joined the board of directors of Brown-Forman in November 2022. In May 2025, Clouse spoke at an event hosted by Lawrence Di Rita at The Economic Club of Washington, D.C..
