= EagleBank Arena =

Arena in Fairfax, Virginia, U.S.

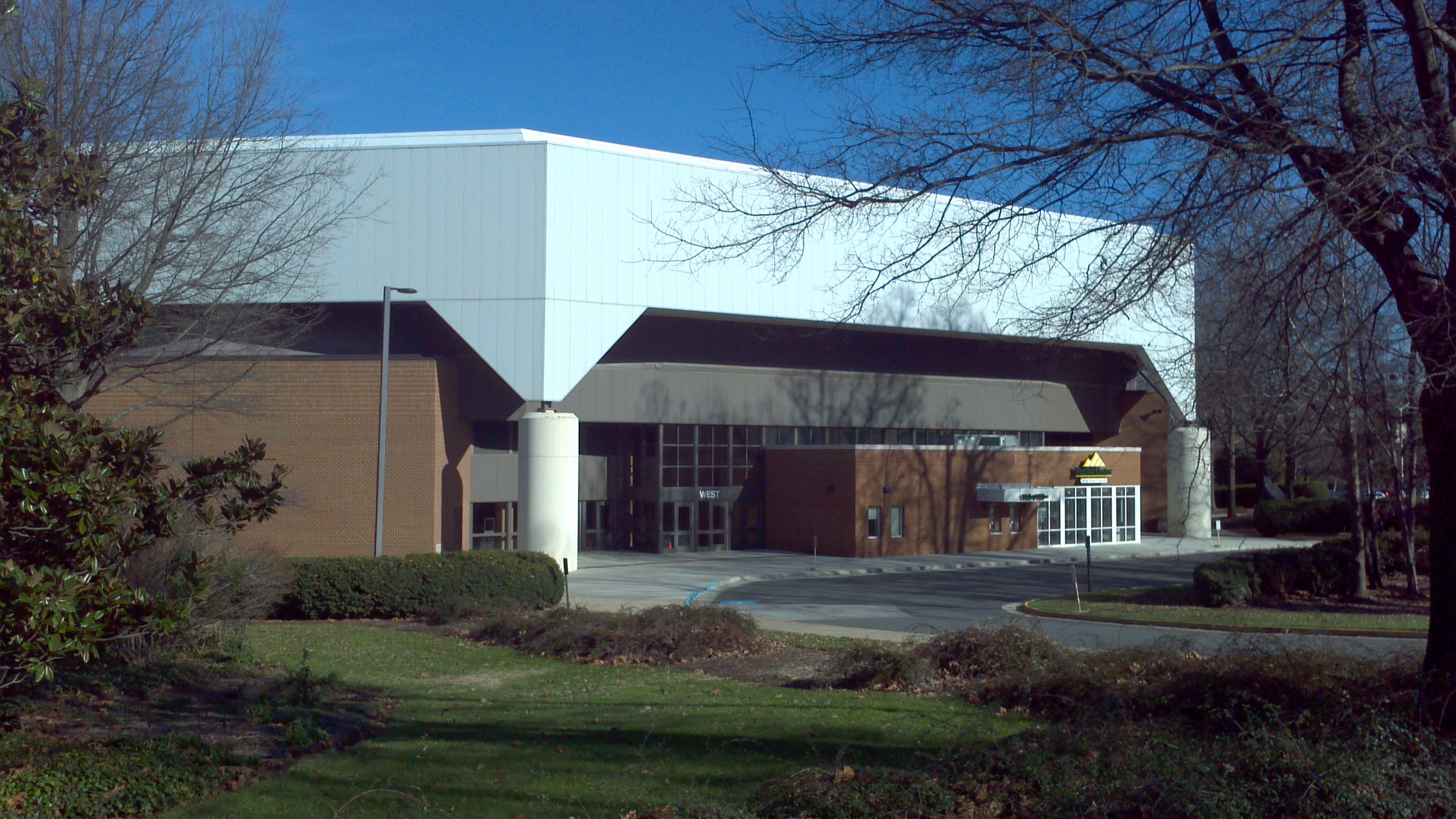
- West entrance in December 2011
- Interactive map of EagleBank Arena
- Full name: EagleBank Arena at George Mason University
- Former names: Patriot Center (1985–2015)
- Address: 4500 Patriot Circle
- Location: Fairfax, Virginia, U.S.
- Coordinates: 38.827°N 77.310°W
- Owner: George Mason University
- Operator: Monumental Sports & Entertainment
- Capacity: Basketball: 10,000
- Surface: Multi-surface

Construction
- Groundbreaking: 1982
- Opened: October 4, 1985; 41 years ago
- Cost: $16 million ($47.9 million in 2025)
- Architects: HOK Sport; Mosley Architects

Tenants
- George Mason Patriots (A10) (1985–present); Washington Commandos (AFL) (1990)

Website
- eaglebankarena.com

EagleBank Arena (originally the Patriot Center) is an indoor arena on the campus of George Mason University in Fairfax, Virginia, United States. Opened 41 years ago in 1985, it is the home of Patriot men's & women's basketball, and is a venue for concerts and family shows, with 17,000 square feet (1,600 m^{2}) of space. EagleBank Arena has a capacity of 10,000.

In 2010, the EagleBank Arena was ranked seventh nationwide and twelfth worldwide according to ticket sales for venues with capacities between 10,001 and 15,000 by trade publication Venues Today. Also in 2010, the Patriot Center was ranked No. 8 nationwide and No. 18 worldwide according to top grossing venues with a capacity between 10,001 and 15,000 by Billboard magazine.

In July 2015, it was renamed the EagleBank Arena. The arena is operated by Monumental Sports & Entertainment.

== History ==
Financing for the construction of the Patriot Center was part of GMU's revenue bond package approved by the Virginia General Assembly in 1982. It replaced a 3,000-seat gymnasium.

The first use of the Patriot Center was GMU's graduation ceremonies in May 1985. The official opening of the arena was five months later on October 4, when the Washington Bullets hosted the New York Knicks in an NBA preseason game, which was the professional debut of future hall of fame center Patrick Ewing, the first overall selection of the 1985 NBA draft out of nearby Georgetown University.

The 1990 NCAA men's volleyball tournament was held at the Patriot Center. It hosted its first Colonial Athletic Association (CAA) men's basketball tournament in 1986 and its first women's tournament in 2005. The Patriots have amassed an overall record of 220–92 (.705) at the Patriot Center and are also 85–10 (.895) in the Patriot Center against CAA opponents. During the 2010–11 season, GMU amassed a perfect 13–0 home record, which was the second time that occurred in three seasons.

The arena underwent a $10 million renovation, completed in 2009, that added new concession stands, hospitality area, locker rooms and bathrooms, and an improved main concourse.

=== Management history ===
From its opening, the Patriot Center was managed by Abe Pollin's Washington Sports, later renamed to Washington Sports & Entertainment. In May 1999, Pollin sold 40% of Washington Sports to a partnership led by Ted Leonsis as part of a $200 million deal that also saw Leonsis purchase the Washington Capitals hockey team. Leonsis's group increased its ownership of Washington Sports to 44% when it bought out minority owner Arnold Heft in January 2000.

Following Pollin's death in 2009, Leonsis purchased the rest of WSE from Pollin's heirs in 2010, and consolidated Washington Sports & Entertainment with his own Lincoln Holdings company to form Monumental Sports & Entertainment. Management of the Patriot Center passed to this successor company.

== Renovations and recent events ==
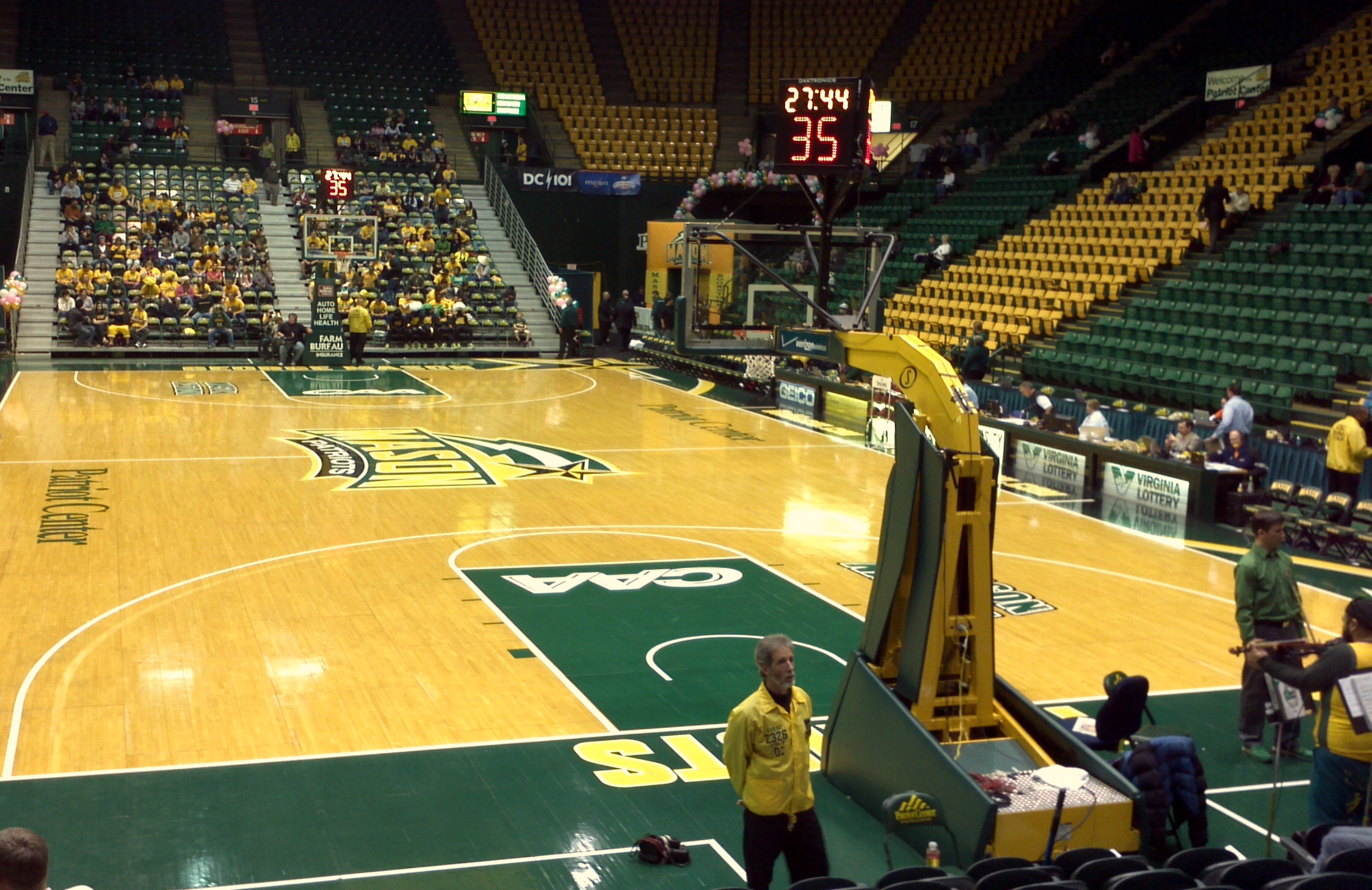
Inside in November 2011

On February 4, 2012, GMU men's basketball debuted a new center court scoreboard and set an attendance record against Old Dominion University on homecoming, which then was reached again against James Madison University; both games were won by double digits.

The Patriot Center is the graduation venue for many students of nearby Northern Virginia high schools in addition to hosting Commencement for Northern Virginia Community College.

The Patriot Center hosted the sold-out UFC Fight Night: Maynard vs. Diaz on January 11, 2010. That was the first time that the UFC had staged an event in the state of Virginia.

The arena also hosted a couple of games for the 2018 JBA season, despite not having a team representing the state of Virginia.

Due to renovations at Capital One Arena, the Washington Mystics played Game 3 of the 2018 WNBA Finals at EagleBank Arena. The Seattle Storm won and it was the final game of the 2018 WNBA season.

== Records ==
- Men's basketball game attendance – 9,900 on February 4, 2012, vs Old Dominion University
- Concert attendance – Phish – 10,356
- Grossing concert – RBD Soy Rebelde - in 2023, $1.9 million
- Grossing family show – Disney on Ice in 2022, $2.46 million
- Most points scored in arena (basketball) – 53 by Bobby Aguirre of Macalester College in 1995

== See also ==
- List of NCAA Division I basketball arenas
