= Thundershorts =

Comedy website

Thundershorts is a short-form comedy website founded in June 2014. It features comedians such as Michael Showalter, Jim Gaffigan, Michael Che, Janeane Garofalo, Kumail Nanjiani, David Wain and Ted Alexandro.
