= Ted Leonsis =

American businessman (born 1957)

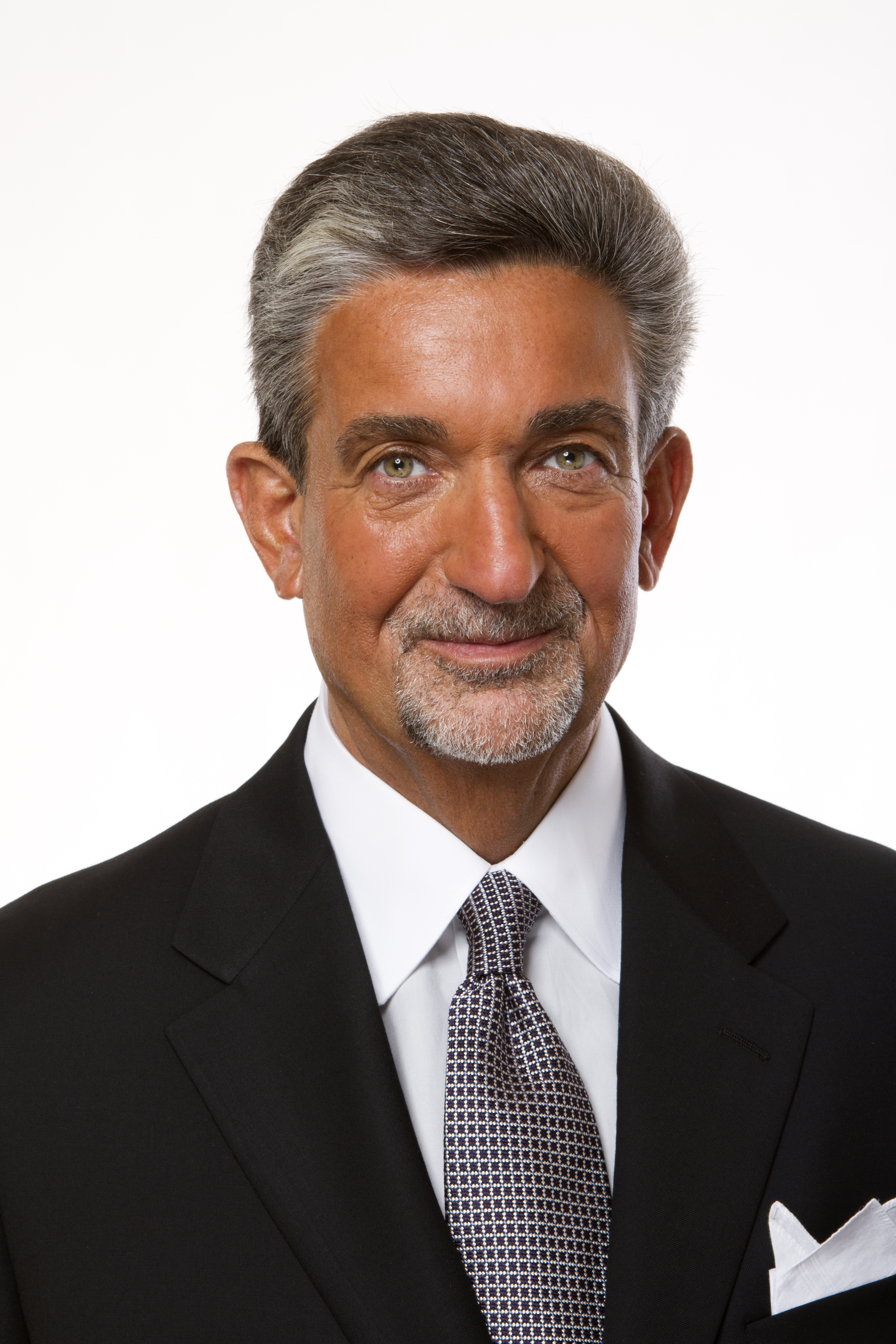
- Leonsis in 2013

15th Chairman of the NHL Board of Governors
- Incumbent
- Assumed office September 22, 2026
- Preceded by: Jeremy Jacobs

Personal details
- Born: January 8, 1957 (age 69) New York City, U.S.
- Spouse: Lynn Leonsis (m. 1987)
- Children: 2
- Education: Georgetown University (BA)
- Known for: Owner of Monumental Sports & Entertainment; Founder of Snagfilms; Former President and Vice-Chairman of AOL
- Website: tedstake.com

Theodore John Leonsis (born January 8, 1957) is an American billionaire businessman and sports team owner. He is a former senior executive with America Online (AOL) and the founder, chairman, and CEO of Monumental Sports & Entertainment, which owns the NHL's Washington Capitals, the NBA's Washington Wizards, the WNBA's Washington Mystics, and Monumental Sports Network.

Leonsis graduated from Georgetown University in 1977. He has served on the board of directors at Georgetown University and also served a brief tenure as the mayor of Orchid, Florida. As of 2026, he held a net worth of $3.9 billion.

== Early life and education ==
Leonsis was born on January 8, 1957, in the Brooklyn borough of New York City to a family of working-class Greek immigrant grandparents, who were mill workers, and parents who worked as a waiter and a secretary. When his high school guidance counselor evaluated his skill set, the counselor concluded that young Ted was destined to work in a grocery store.

He attended Brooklyn Technical High School, before moving to Lowell, Massachusetts, where he graduated from Lowell High School in 1973. He was first in his family to go to a university, where he attended Georgetown University to pursue his undergraduate studies majoring in American Studies, and graduated in 1977 at the top of his class.

== Early business career ==
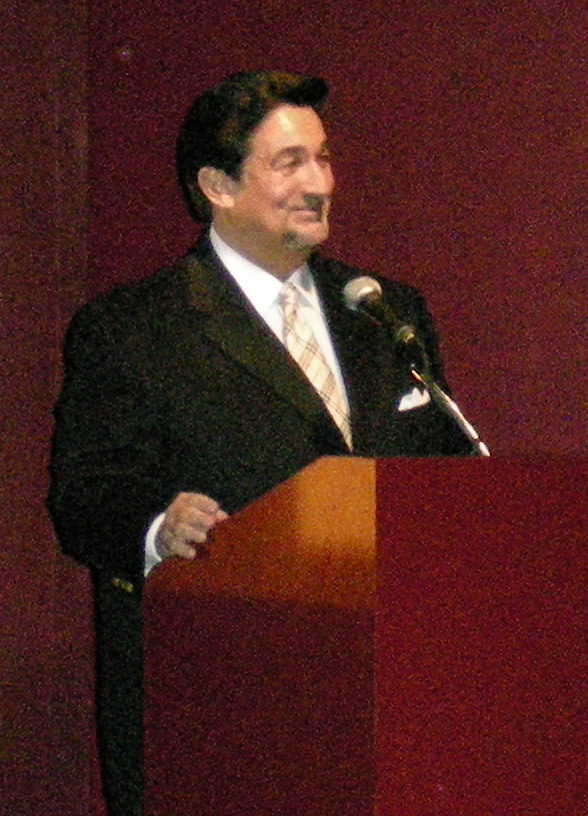
Leonsis in 2008

After graduating from college, he moved back to his parents' home in Lowell and began working for Wang Laboratories as a corporate communications manager and Harris Corp. as a marketing executive.

Leonsis left Harris Corporation in March 1981. He started LIST, a magazine focused on personal computing. He raised $1 million in seed capital with his partner Vincent Pica. The first issue of the magazine was published in 1982. Two years later, he sold the company to Thomson Reuters for $40 million, netting him $20 million.

=== AOL ===
In 1988, Leonsis established the PR company Redgate Communications Corporation. When the organization was acquired by America Online (AOL) in 1994, Leonsis began working with AOL as a senior executive, remaining with the company for 13 years. He held numerous positions at AOL before retiring in 2006 as the audience group's president and vice-chairman.

== Sports ownership ==
Leonsis is the founder, managing partner, chairman and CEO of Monumental Sports & Entertainment, which owns the NHL's Washington Capitals, NBA's Washington Wizards, NBA G League's Capital City Go-Go, WNBA's Washington Mystics, and formerly the AFL's Washington Valor and Baltimore Brigade. Monumental Sports owns Capital One Arena in Washington, D.C., and manages the MedStar Capitals Iceplex and George Mason University's EagleBank Arena.

=== Arena partnership ===
In 2023, Leonsis threatened to move the Washington Wizards and Capitals from the District of Columbia unless the city provided $600 million in public funding for a major renovation of Capital One Arena. Mayor Muriel Bowser offered $500 million towards the proposed $800 million project to modernize the aging downtown arena for the Washington Wizards and Capitals. In December 2023, Leonsis and Virginia Governor Glenn Youngkin announced that Virginia would offer more than $1.35 billion in taxpayer money to build a new venue for the Capitals and Wizards in Alexandria, Virginia, marking the largest public subsidy for such a project.

When Virginia's legislation for a stadium authority was not approved, Leonsis and Mayor Bowser reached an agreement to keep the teams at Capital One Arena. If the Youngkin-Leonsis deal had not been rejected by lawmakers, it would have the largest public stadium subsidy of its kind. In December 2024, the D.C. Council approved an agreement with Monumental Sports to renovate Capital One Arena. Construction began in 2025 and is expected to be completed by 2027.

=== Washington Capitals ===
Leonsis has owned the Washington Capitals since the spring of 1999, and in that timeframe the team has won seven Southeast Division titles, six Metropolitan Division titles, three Presidents' Trophies, recorded 588 consecutive sellouts at Verizon Center (now Capital One Arena), and won a Stanley Cup championship.

In the early years of his ownership, the Capitals won back-to-back Southeast Division titles in 2000 and 2001, but lost in the first round of the playoffs to the Pittsburgh Penguins. In summer 2001, the Capitals traded for Jaromír Jágr and signed him to what was, at the time, the largest contract in NHL history. The trade was enthusiastically well received by fans and over 300 people showed up at Dulles International Airport to greet Jágr when he arrived. After Jágr was traded in 2004, Leonsis was criticized by fans. He was involved in a physical altercation with a fan, who led a mocking chant of Leonsis during the game and hoisted a sign chiding him. In the altercation, Leonsis grabbed and threw the fan to the ground, which also caused a young child to fall to the ground. For his involvement in the scuffle, Leonsis was fined $100,000. He also received a suspension of one week, during which he was prohibited from having any contact with the team. After the incident, Leonsis personally called the fan to apologize for his actions and invited him and his family to watch a game in the owner's box.

In 2007, he changed the Capitals team logo and its colors back to their original red, white, and blue.

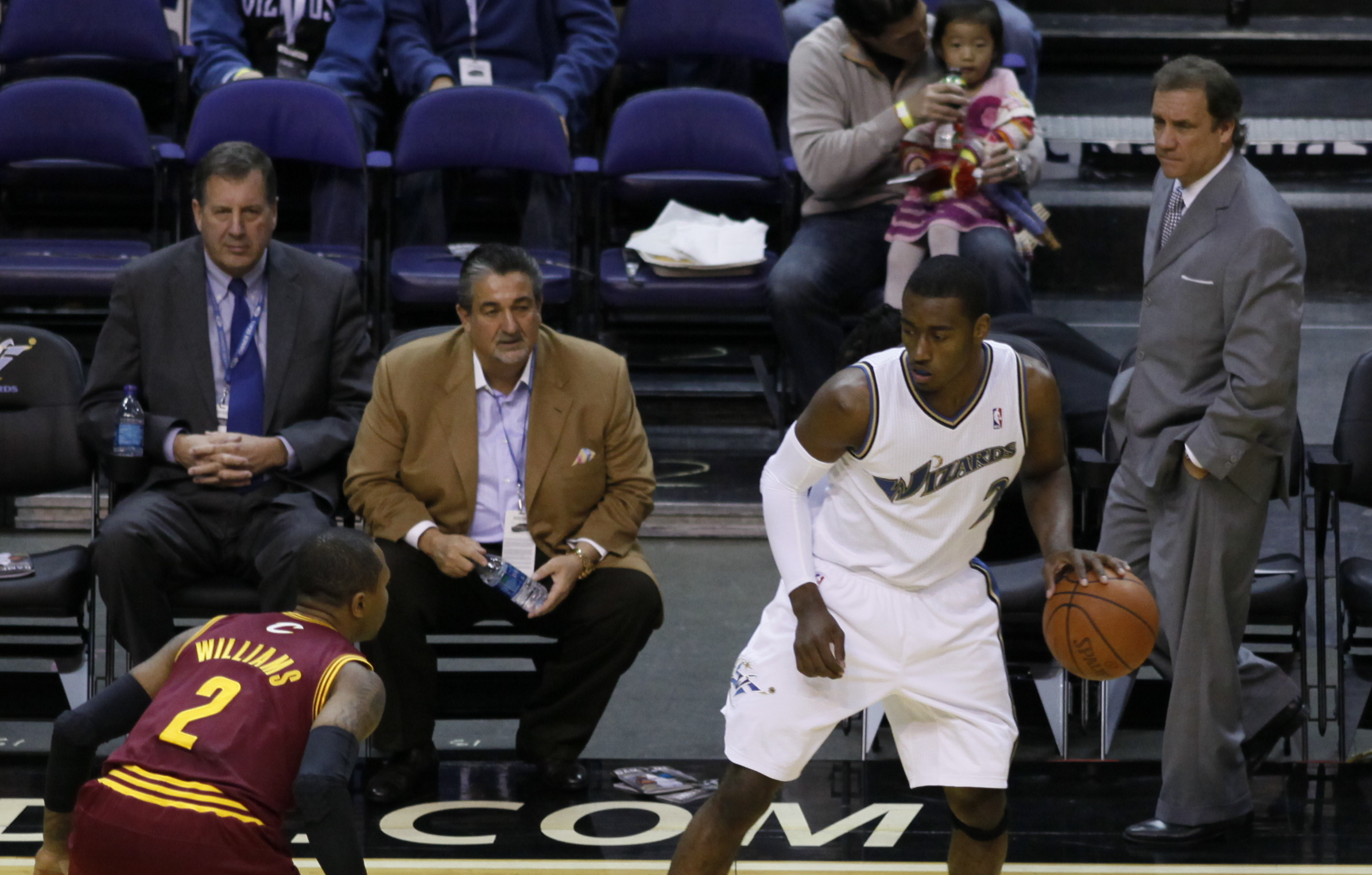
Leonsis watches Wizards player John Wall in 2010

In 2010, journalist Damien Cox, author of the Ovechkin Project, a biography of Alexander Ovechkin, wrote that Leonsis was trying to circumvent the NHL's salary cap when signing Ovechkin's contract. He also alleged that Leonsis was bribing bloggers for positive coverage of the Capitals. Leonsis said that Cox was angry that he did not receive the access to Ovechkin that he wanted and defended his support for the league.

During the 2009–2010 season, the Capitals earned the NHL's Presidents' Trophy as the team that finished with the most points in the league during the regular season.

The 2010–2011 season marked the highest attendance in franchise history, drawing 754,309 fans. The Capitals, like other teams, have raised ticket prices in recent years. In 2011, after raising ticket prices for the fourth consecutive year while shrinking the size of beers sold at the Verizon Center, he earned the nickname "Leon$i$". In 2001, Leonsis claimed to have written a computer program that prevented Pittsburgh Penguins fans (the Capitals first-round opponent) from purchasing tickets online. When asked if the actions were unfair, Leonsis stated, "I don't care. I'm going to keep doing it." Again in 2009, he received criticism for preventing visiting team fans from purchasing Capitals playoff tickets.

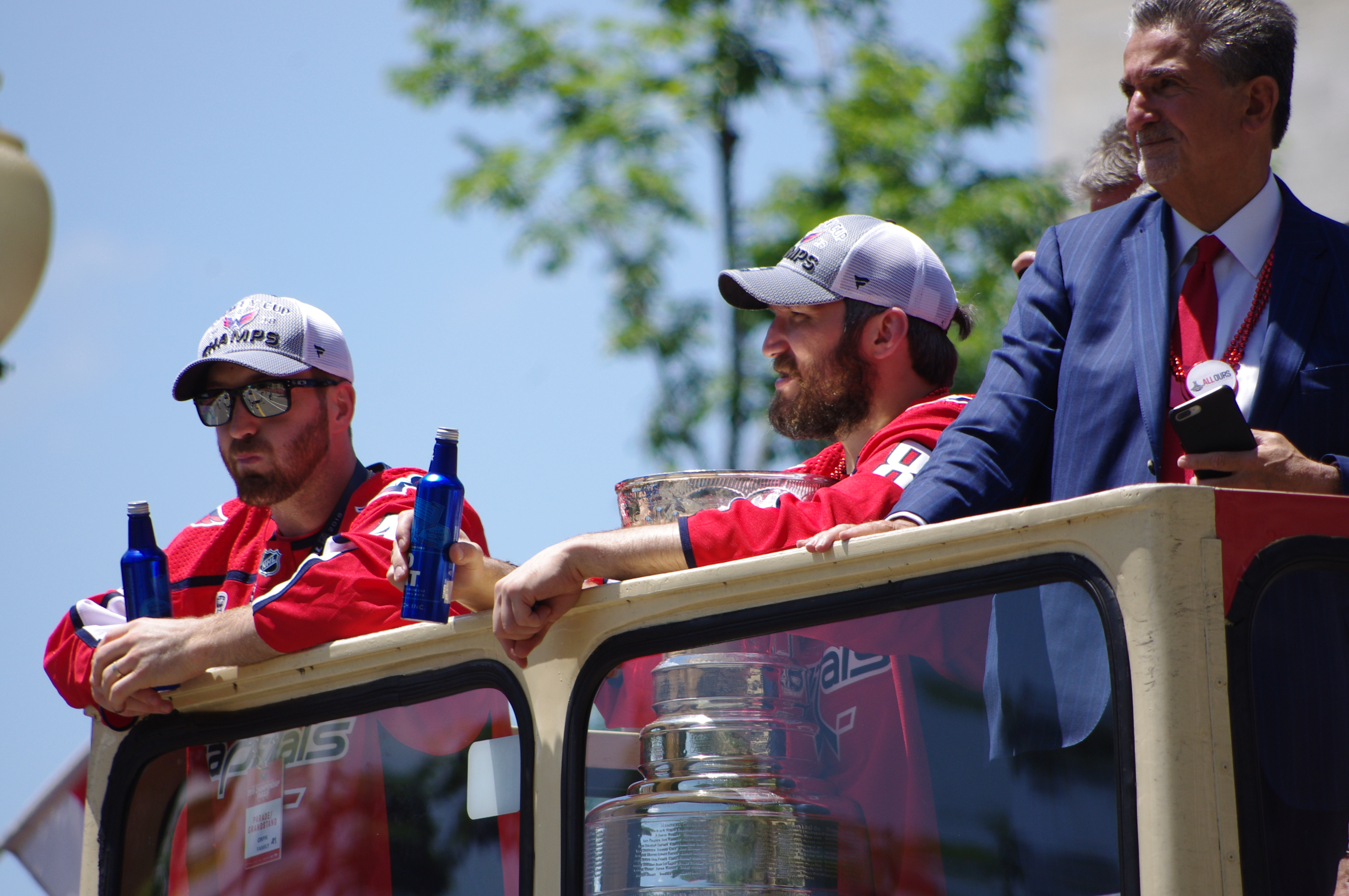
Leonsis (right) with Brooks Orpik and Alexander Ovechkin during the 2018 Stanley Cup championship parade

In the face of community opposition, Leonsis has persisted with a plan to expand the billboards around the Verizon Center. Critics said the signage would make the arena more garish and cheapen DC's Chinatown, Leonsis said it was necessary to raise an additional $20 to 30 million in annual revenue, and a sports expert explained that "an owner saddled with underperforming teams is under greater pressure to find income sources." Leonsis persevered and in March 2013 construction of the new signs were announced.

On June 7, 2018, the Washington Capitals won the Stanley Cup championship by defeating the Vegas Golden Knights four games to one. This was the first Stanley Cup victory in the Capitals' history.

=== Washington Wizards ===
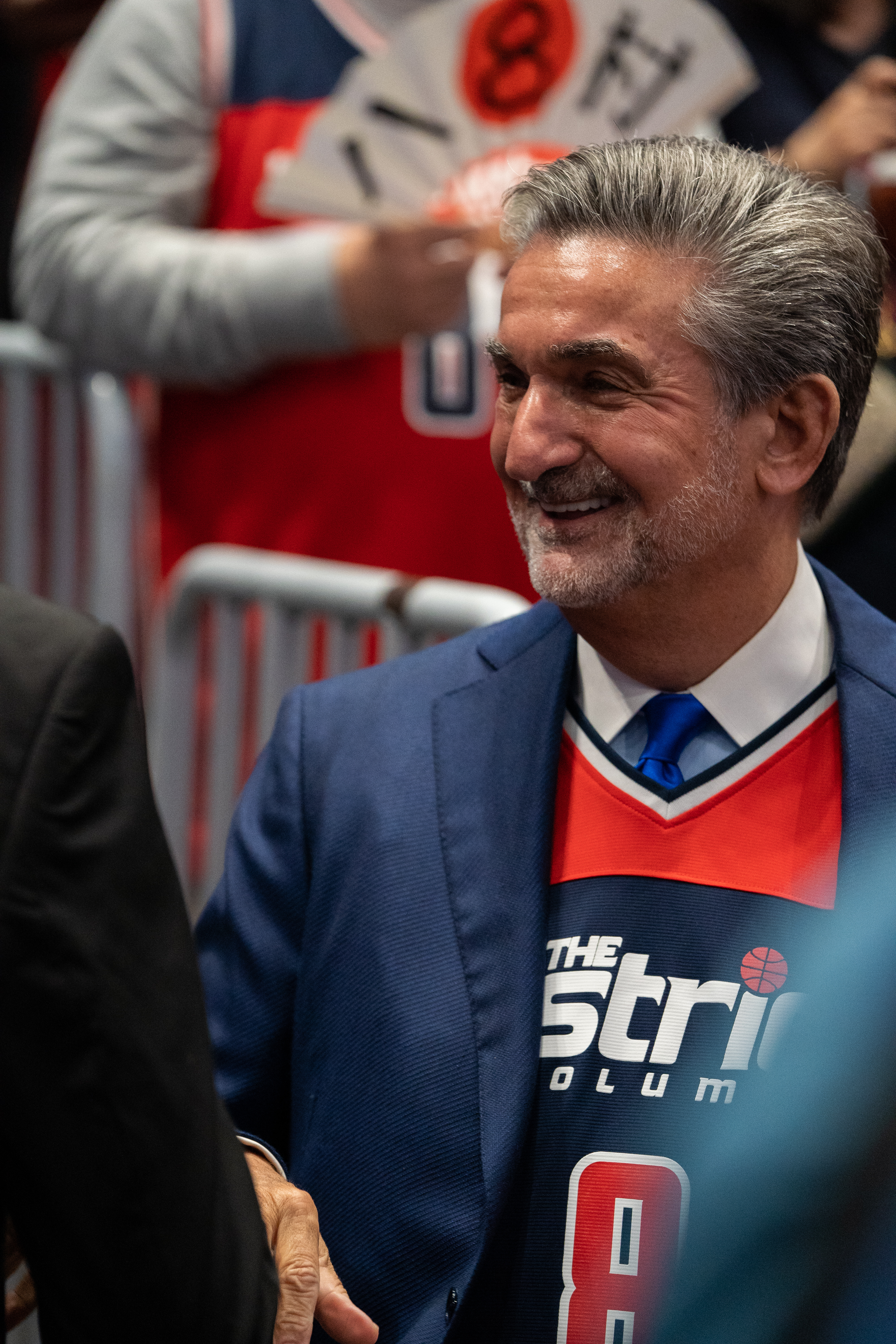
Leonsis at a Washington Wizards game in 2019

Leonsis became the majority owner of the Washington Wizards in June 2010, inheriting a team that had 26 wins and 56 losses during the previous season. Leonsis was initially believed to have taken a fan-centric approach to running the franchise, thought to be listening and responding to the concerns of Wizards supporters through his email and personal website.

After purchasing the Wizards, Leonsis criticized the NBA's salary cap at a luncheon with business leaders. In 2010, the league fined him $100,000 for "unauthorized public comments regarding the league's collective bargaining negotiations."

In May 2011, the Wizards unveiled a red, white, and blue color scheme, along with uniforms reminiscent of those worn by the team under their former name, the Bullets, when they won the NBA championship in 1978. Additionally, he considered restoring the Bullets name to the franchise, though critics said that this would "send the wrong message" about gun violence in Washington.

Leonsis was chairman of the NBA's 2014 media committee that negotiated a nine-year expanded partnership with Turner Broadcasting and The Walt Disney Company.

During Leonsis' tenure as owner, Washington ranks 24th of the 30 NBA franchises in winning percentage. The Wizards have missed the playoffs in eight of 13 seasons, have posted a .500 or worse record nine times, and have never advanced to the Eastern Conference finals.

=== Washington Mystics ===
Leonsis purchased the rights to the Washington Mystics, a Women's National Basketball Association team, around the same time he took over the Wizards. The Mystics won a WNBA championship in 2019.

=== Washington Valor and Baltimore Brigade ===
On March 10, 2016, Leonsis announced that he was purchasing an expansion franchise in the Arena Football League (AFL) to play at the Verizon Center beginning in 2017. On March 16, 2016, the expansion was confirmed by AFL commissioner Scott Butera. On July 14, 2016, the team name was revealed as the Washington Valor. On November 14, 2016, Monumental announced that it had acquired another AFL team that would begin play in 2017 in Baltimore. The team name was later revealed as the Baltimore Brigade. But in 2019, those teams went defunct, as the league went bankrupt and dissolved.

=== Capital City Go-Go ===
In 2018, Leonsis announced the purchase of an NBA G League franchise that would be later named the Capital City Go-Go.

== Other businesses ==
Leonsis was the founder, chairman, and largest shareholder of the defunct SnagFilms, a content and technology company with a full-service video streaming platform. The company owned indieWIRE, a news site, until 2016. His first production was the documentary Nanking, which premiered at the 2007 Sundance Film Festival. The film is based on the book The Rape of Nanking by Iris Chang. It was honored with the 2008 Peabody Award and the 2009 News & Documentary Emmy Award for Best Historical Programming (Long Form).

In 2008, Leonsis produced Kicking It, a documentary by Susan Koch about the 2006 Homeless World Cup. The film was narrated by actor Colin Farrell and featured residents of Afghanistan; Kenya; Dublin, Ireland; Charlotte, North Carolina; Madrid; and Saint Petersburg. The film premiered in January 2008 at the Sundance Film Festival. A third documentary, A Fighting Chance, tells the story of Kyle Maynard, who became a nationally ranked wrestler, motivational speaker, and bestselling author, despite being born without arms or legs. In 2013, Leonsis produced the documentary Lost for Life, which explores juvenile offenders who have been sentenced to life without parole.

Leonsis founded Revolution Money, a company which provides secure payments through an Internet-based platform. In 2009, the company was sold to American Express; Leonsis is now on the board of directors at American Express, having joined in 2010. He is cofounder and partner in the D.C.-based venture fund, Revolution Growth, and chairman of Clearspring Technologies. He is co-inventor of Only In New York, a board game about New York City. Leonsis is a member of the investment group, aXiomatic, which owns Team Liquid, a competitive eSports Team.

== Personal life ==
Leonsis married Lynn Leonsis in August 1987 and they have a son and a daughter.

As of February 2025, Forbes estimates his net worth at $3.1 billion. In early 2011, Leonsis purchased a 13-acre estate in Potomac, Maryland. He acquired the property for $20 million after selling homes in McLean, Virginia, and Vero Beach, Florida. The 20,000-square-foot (1,900 m^{2}) estate was once the home of Joseph P. Kennedy, summer home of Franklin Roosevelt, and was owned by the Gore family from 1942 to 1995. Leonsis purchased the home from Chris Rogers, a telecommunications executive who acquired Leonsis' home in McLean. Leonsis is the former owner of a 40-foot yacht.

Leonsis has authored a number of books, including Blue Magic: The People, Power and Politics Behind the IBM PC and The Business of Happiness: 6 Secrets to Extraordinary Success in Work and Life.

He was on the board of directors and board of regents for Georgetown University in 2008–2009. Leonsis is the founder of the Leonsis Foundation, which supports children "overcome obstacles and achieve their goals".

=== Politics ===
Leonsis once served as the mayor of Orchid, Florida. Leonsis got involved in politics after he ran a friend's campaign for Congress and worked as an intern for Paul Tsongas's office in Washington, D.C. He donated to the campaign of Barack Obama during his 2008 and 2012 elections and Hillary Clinton in 2016.

Leonsis was vice chairman of Washington 2024, the region's bid for Summer 2024 Olympic and Paralympic Games. In June 2014 the United States Olympic Committee identified Washington and three other cities as potential locations. The USOC ultimately selected Los Angeles, which lost the 2024 bid, but was awarded the 2028 Summer Games.

== Published works ==
- Leonsis, Ted (1984). Software Master for the IBM PC (128k), Warner Software, 323 pages. ISBN 978-0446381253
- Leonsis, Ted (1984). Software Master for Pes: Apple Version (48k), Warner Software. ISBN 978-0446381772
- Chposky, James; and Ted Leonsis (1988). Blue Magic: The People, Power and Politics Behind the IBM Personal Computer, Facts on File Publications, 228 pages. ISBN 978-0816013913
- Leonsis, Ted (2010). The Business of Happiness: 6 Secrets to Extraordinary Success in Work and Life, Regnery Publishing, 256 pages. ISBN 978-1596981140

Sporting positions
Preceded by Abe Pollin	Washington Capitals principal owner 1999–present	Incumbent
Preceded by Abe Pollin	Washington Wizards principal owner 2010–present	Incumbent
Preceded by Abe Pollin	Washington Mystics principal owner 2010–present	Incumbent
