= Lisa Lockerd Maragakis =

American professor

Lisa Lockerd Maragakis is an infectious disease specialist and professor with dual appointments, both at the Johns Hopkins School of Medicine and Johns Hopkins Bloomberg School of Public Health. She is also Senior Director of Infection Prevention at the Johns Hopkins Health System as well as the hospital epidemiologist. She is also a designated representative to the Healthcare Infection Control Practices Advisory Committee (HICPAC) at the Department of Health and Human Services.

Maragakis earned her medical degree at the Johns Hopkins School of Medicine.

== Publications ==
- COVID-19 Vaccines: Myth Versus Fact
