= Monumental Sports & Entertainment =

American sports and venue management company

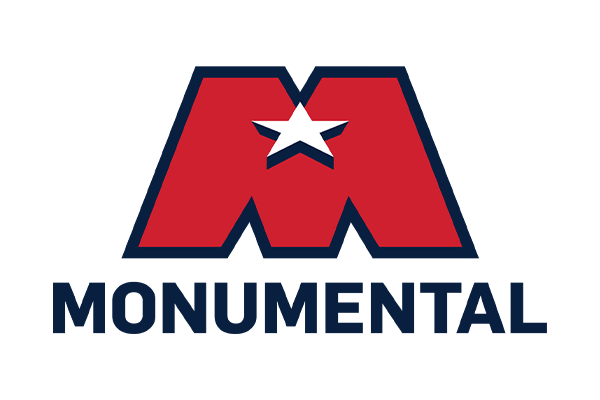
- Type: Private
- Industry: Sports management; Venue management
- Founded: June 10, 2010; 16 years ago
- Founder: Ted Leonsis (Chairman and CEO)
- Headquarters: Washington, D.C., U.S.
- Key people: Vice Chairpeople; Raul Fernandez; Sheila Johnson
- Brands: Washington Capitals (NHL); Washington Wizards (NBA); Washington Mystics (WNBA); Capital City Go-Go (G League); Monumental Sports Network
- Total assets: ▲$7.84 billion (July 2025)
- Website: monumentalsports.com

Monumental Sports & Entertainment (MSE) is an American sports and venue management company founded by Ted Leonsis in June 2010. Monumental owns and operates the NHL team Washington Capitals, the NBA team Washington Wizards, the WNBA team Washington Mystics, the NBA G League team Capital City Go-Go and the NBA 2K League team Wizards District Gaming. Other properties owned include Monumental Sports Network, Capital One Arena, EagleBank Arena, and the defunct Arena Football League (AFL) teams Washington Valor and Baltimore Brigade. Monumental is headquartered in Washington, D.C., and had $7.84 billion in assets as of 2025.

== History ==
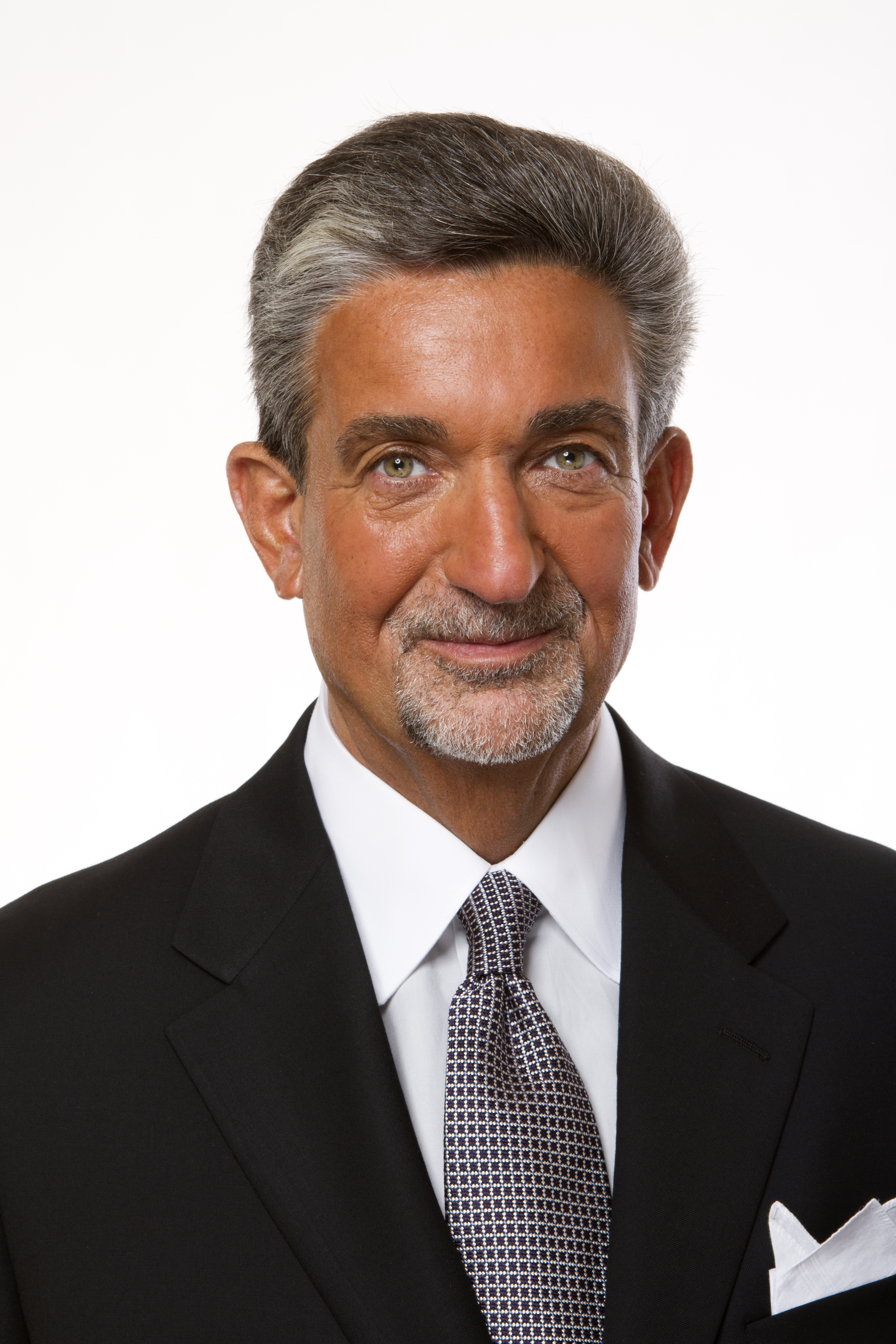
Chairman and CEO Ted Leonsis founded Monumental Sports & Entertainment in 2010.

American businessman and senior AOL executive Ted Leonsis, who had owned the NHL team Washington Capitals since 1999, founded Monumental Sports & Entertainment on June 10, 2010, following his acquisition of the NBA team Washington Wizards and the merger of Lincoln Holdings and Washington Sports & Entertainment. Minority shareholders of Monumental include the Qatar Investment Authority, Jeffrey Skoll, Sheila Johnson, Mark Lerner and Arctos Partners.

In December 2023, Leonsis announced a non-binding partnership with Virginia governor Glenn Youngkin to move the Capitals and Wizards to a planned arena in Potomac Yard in Alexandria, Virginia, by 2028. The structure would be part of an arts and entertainment district at the site, which would include a practice facility, restaurants, an esports venue, concert hall, and a new headquarters for Monumental.

In March 2024, after officials in Alexandria announced that the $2 billion entertainment and sports complex plans were scrapped, Washington D.C. mayor Muriel Bowser announced a new deal to keep the Capitals and Wizards in the District until 2050.

In July, Monumental was valued by CNBC at $7.84 billion.

In December 2025, MSE announced that Laurene Powell Jobs, a minority shareholder since 2017, had sold her stake to Arctos Partners and the Qatar Investment Authority. As part of the deal, the Qatar Investment Authority increased its shareholding of the company.

== Brands and properties ==
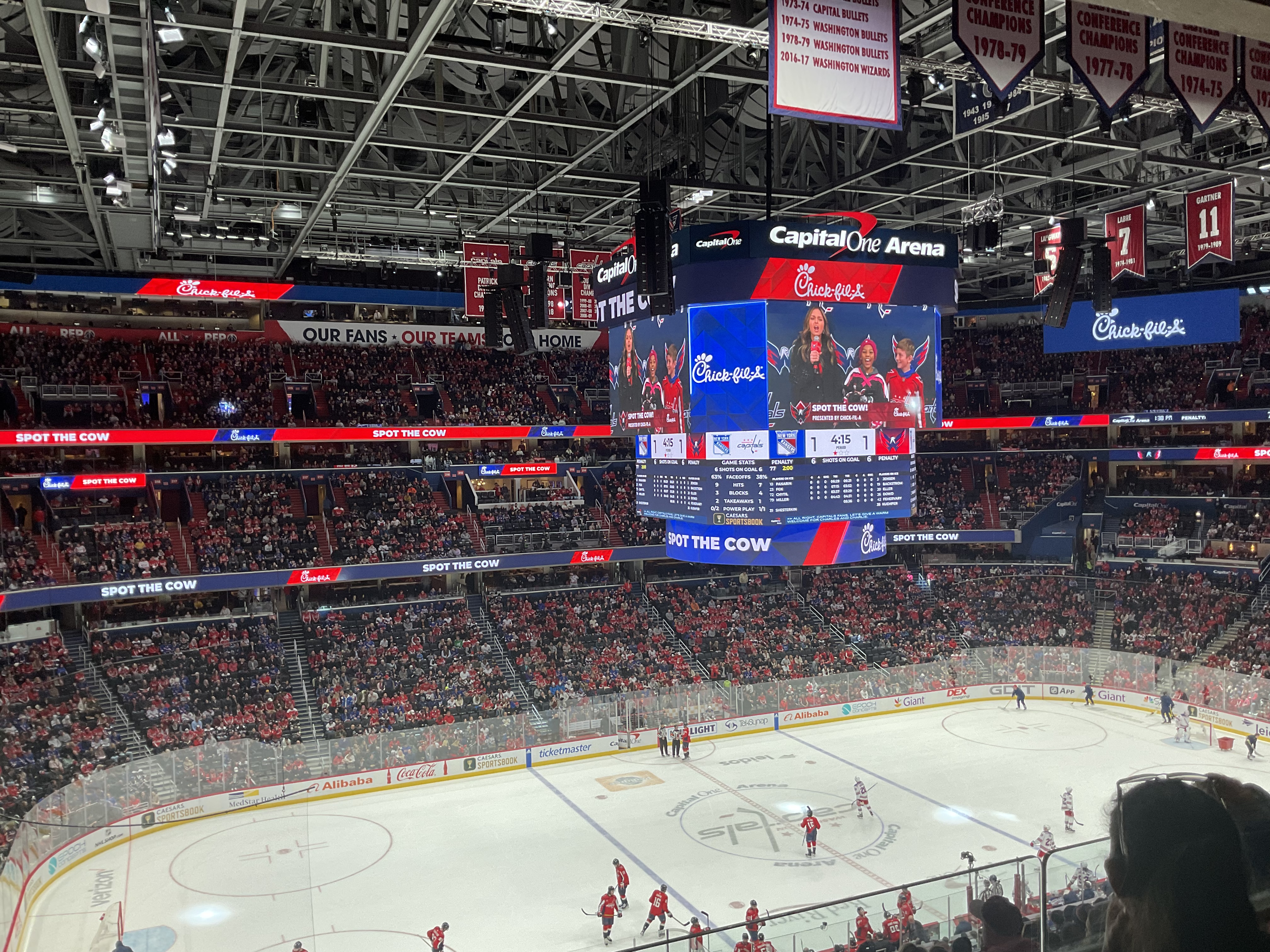
The Capital One Arena hosting a Washington Capitals game, both owned and operated by Monumental

- Washington Capitals, National Hockey League (NHL) team
  - MedStar Capitals Iceplex, practice facility
  - Caps Gaming, esports organization
- Washington Wizards, National Basketball Association (NBA) team
  - Capital City Go-Go, NBA G League team
  - Wizards District Gaming, NBA 2K League team
- Washington Mystics, Women's National Basketball Association (WNBA) team
- Washington Valor, defunct Arena Football League (AFL) team
- Baltimore Brigade, defunct AFL team
- Capital One Arena, home arena of the Capitals and Wizards
  - District E, esports venue
  - Guy Fieri's DC Kitchen + Bar, restaurant
- EagleBank Arena, arena at George Mason University
- Monumental Sports Network, regional sports network
