= Kicking It =

- Directed by: Susan Koch; Jeff Werner
- Written by: Susan Koch
- Produced by: Ted Leonsis; Jedd Wider; Todd Wider
- Narrated by: Colin Farrell
- Edited by: Jeff Werner
- Music by: Barry Cole
- Release date: June 13, 2008
- Running time: 98 minutes
- Country: United States
- Language: English

Kicking It is a 2008 documentary film directed by Susan Koch and Jeff Werner focusing on the experiences of seven homeless people at the Homeless World Cup football (soccer) game. Featured in the documentary, narrated by actor Colin Farrell were residents of Afghanistan; Kenya; Dublin, Ireland; Charlotte, North Carolina; Madrid, Spain and St. Petersburg, Russia. The film premiered in January 2008 at the Sundance Film Festival and is being distributed by Liberation Entertainment, Netflix and ESPN. It has received mixed reviews.

== Background ==
The Homeless World Cup is an annual international football competition for the homeless, first held in 2003 in Austria. The documentary was filmed during 2006, when the event was hosted in Cape Town, South Africa. 48 teams composed of 500 homeless persons gathered to compete.

Co-producer Ted Leonsis, owner of the Washington Capitals and Washington Wizards, described the documentary as an act of "filmanthropy", "using film and other media platforms to catalyze social change and actively give back to society." Narrator Colin Farrell indicated that he decided to participate in the documentary after seeing it and determining that the film was both "undeniably moving" and "important", noting that he was particularly affected by the stories of Afghanistan's Najib and Ireland's Simon.

== Distribution ==
At Sundance, sports broadcaster ESPN signed on to help the film secure theatrical and DVD distribution while securing television rights worldwide to itself. Subsequently, such distribution was secured through Liberation Entertainment and Netflix.

== Critical reception ==
Although according to The Washington Times the film "drew rave reviews at the Sundance and Tribeca film festivals and at its New York premiere", reviews in New York were mixed. Positive reviews in Time Out of New York and The New York Press described it as a "thoughtful portrayal" and a "strongly composed drama", "[p]lain-spoken and smoothly paced", respectively, though New York Press questioned the usefulness of Farrell to the film, except in providing wider exposure. The New York Times characterized the film as "long on soulful commentary and spirited game play, but short on surprise and relevance beyond its basic social service function." The New York Daily News found the film "well-meaning" and "without much sentimentality", but indicated that "it could benefit from a more pared-down approach."

In other areas, reviews have also been mixed. Boxoffice described the film as "thoughtful and poignant", "wonderfully lucid and occasionally transcendent." News Blaze summarized it as a "tearjerker certain to elicit concern and compassion from anyone watching for the billion on the planet still homeless", describing Koch's direction as "remarkable" and citing as the value of the film "the intimate portraits" of the participants. Seattle Weekly described it as "good-hearted but artless" and "heavy-handed". Deseret News of Salt Lake City, Utah, called the film "earnestly watchable" with "enough drama and action for several films", while in its online blog The Portland Mercury passionately decried Farrell's eight-minute part as "putrid", indicating that otherwise "the film at least presents some engaging questions" though it concludes that "[b]y the end of the film it's clear that soccer has as much to do with solving the global problem of homelessness as golf does, or, maybe, keeping hamsters." Film Journal International indicated that the film was "a fine public-service announcement", a view echoing that of Variety which opined that "it promotes a good cause, as might any public service announcement" but also suggested that "[a]s a documentary, it's hardly hard-hitting journalism." "That this documentary feeds some stereotypes and gives only cursory understanding but much hand-wringing is a shame", Film Journal International concluded, "But then, many more people will see this on ESPN than in theatres, and if this documentary-lite helps raise consciousness a little among the beer-and-basketball set, then it has indeed walked a bit with the angels."

== See also ==
- List of association football films
