= The Economic Club of Washington, D.C. =

Non-profit, non-partisan member-based organization

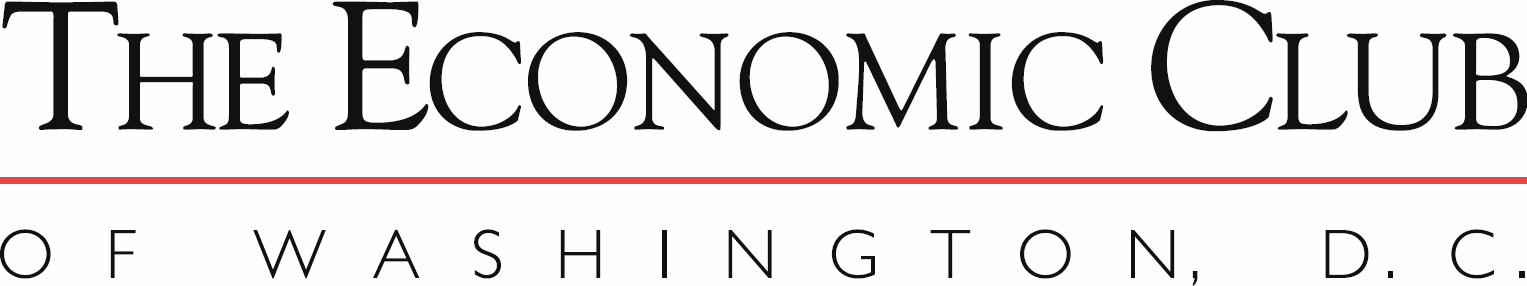

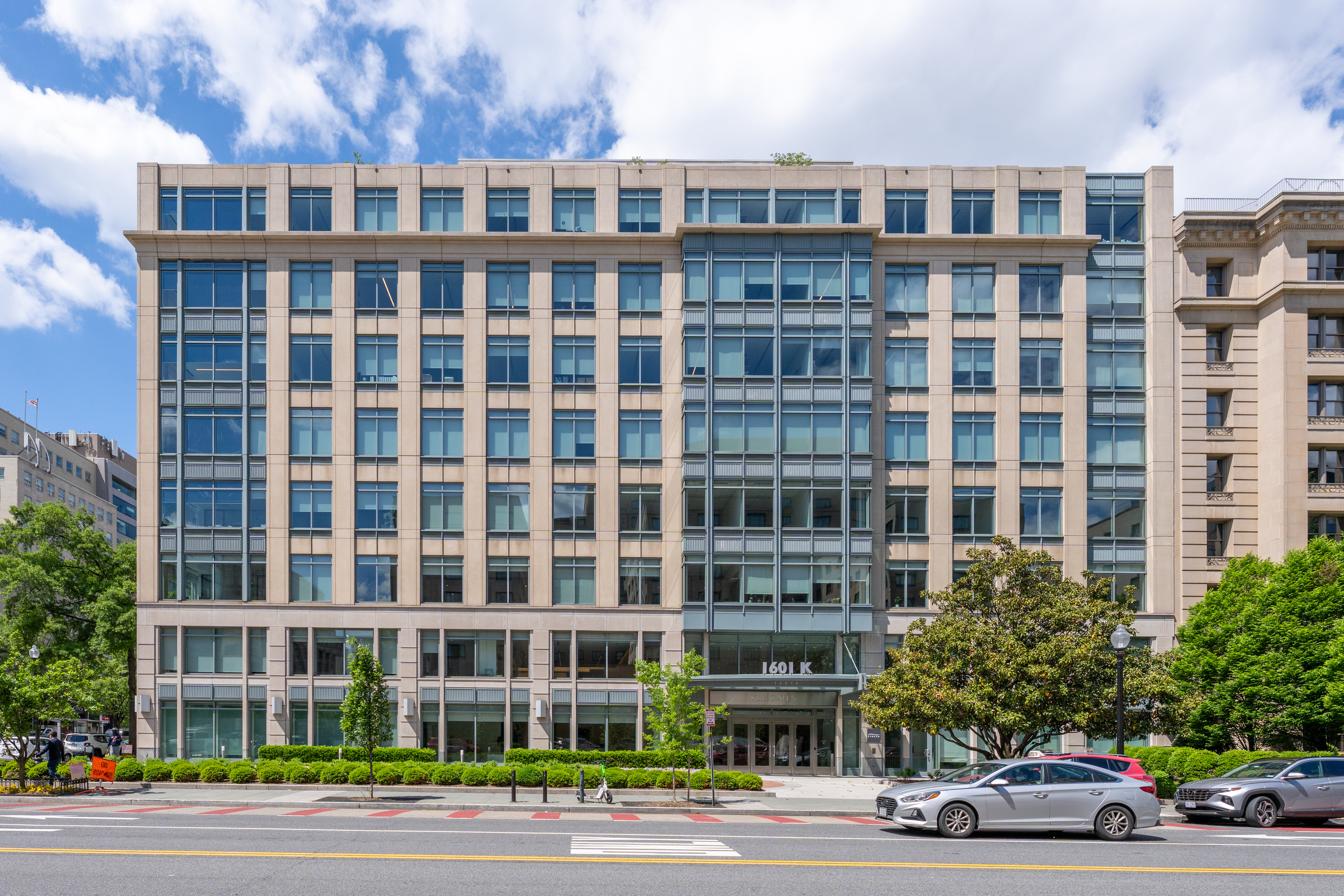
- Headquarters in Washington, D.C.
- Formation: 1986; 40 years ago
- Legal status: 501(c)(3) organization
- Purpose: To provide a premier forum for Washington, D.C. business leaders
- Headquarters: Washington, D.C., U.S.
- Members: 950+
- Chairman: David Rubenstein
- Website: https://www.economicclub.org/

The Economic Club of Washington, D.C. is a private club founded in 1986 to promote ties among business leaders and with the diplomatic community. Noted for its speaker series, the club is currently chaired by lawyer and businessman David Rubenstein.

== History ==
=== 20th century ===
The Economic Club was founded in 1986 as a private forum for discussing public policy. Its first president, Robert Linowes, who served until 1992, and his successor Harry McPherson, who served until 1999, worked to secure noted speakers for Club events, including Hillary Clinton in 1994. Its third president, former U.S. Senator George J. Mitchell, who served until 2004, appointed several members to develop a strategic plan.

=== 21st century ===
Vernon Jordan, who served as president until 2008, secured U.S. president George W. Bush as a speaker in 2005.

In 2008, David Rubenstein, a co-founder and co-executive chairman of The Carlyle Group, one of the world’s largest private equity firms, became chairman of the club. Under Rubenstein, the club's membership increased from 425 to over 950, and the number of meetings each season grew from an four or five to as many as 14.

In 2012, the Washington Post wrote, "The club’s success stems as much from its exclusivity as its appeal as a forum for speakers wishing to bend Washington’s ear...It’s also an audience that tends to more reflect the region’s suit-and-tie establishment than its open-collar — and increasingly diverse — entrepreneur class."

== Events and speakers ==
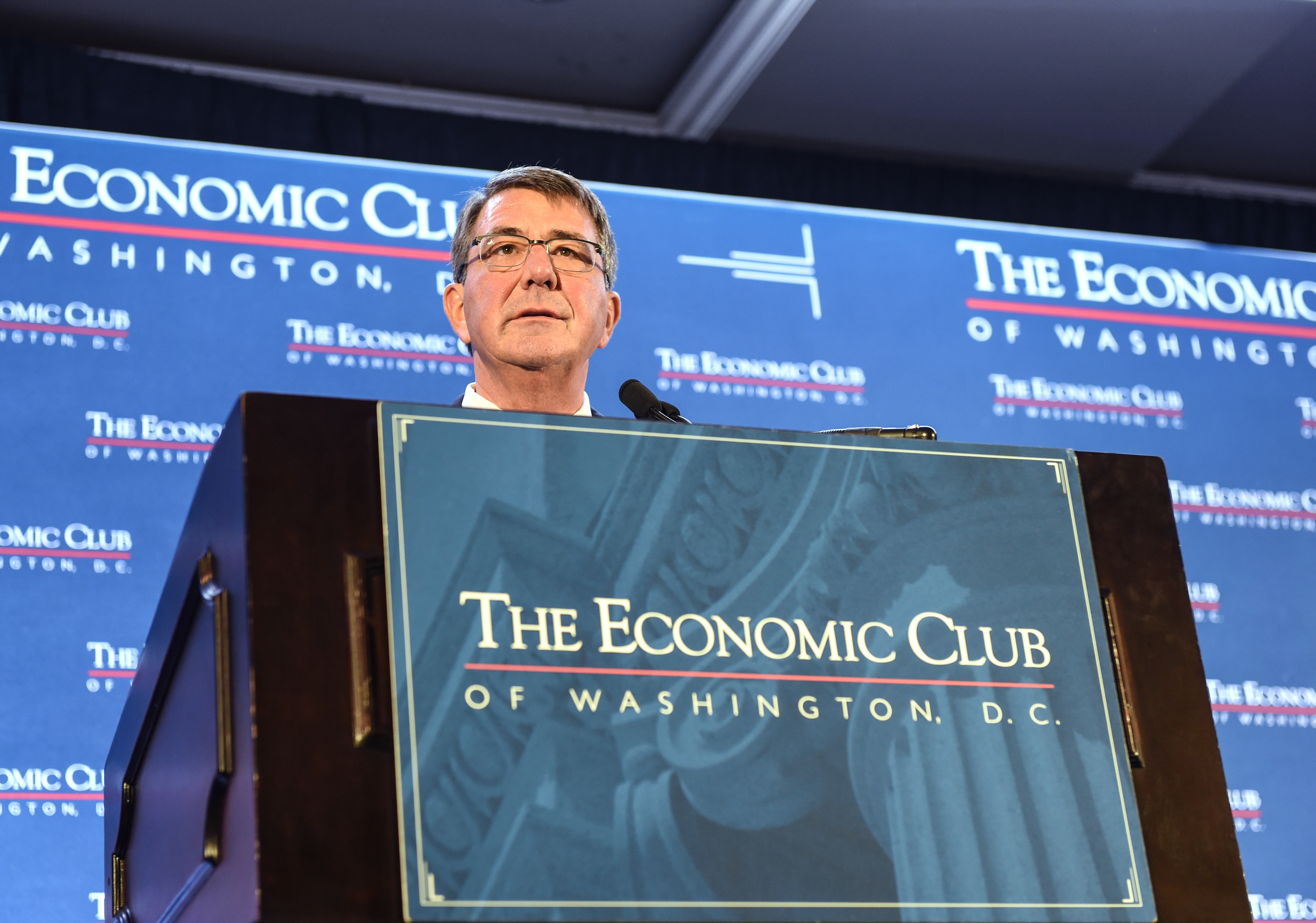
Former Secretary of Defense Ash Carter speaking to club members, 2016

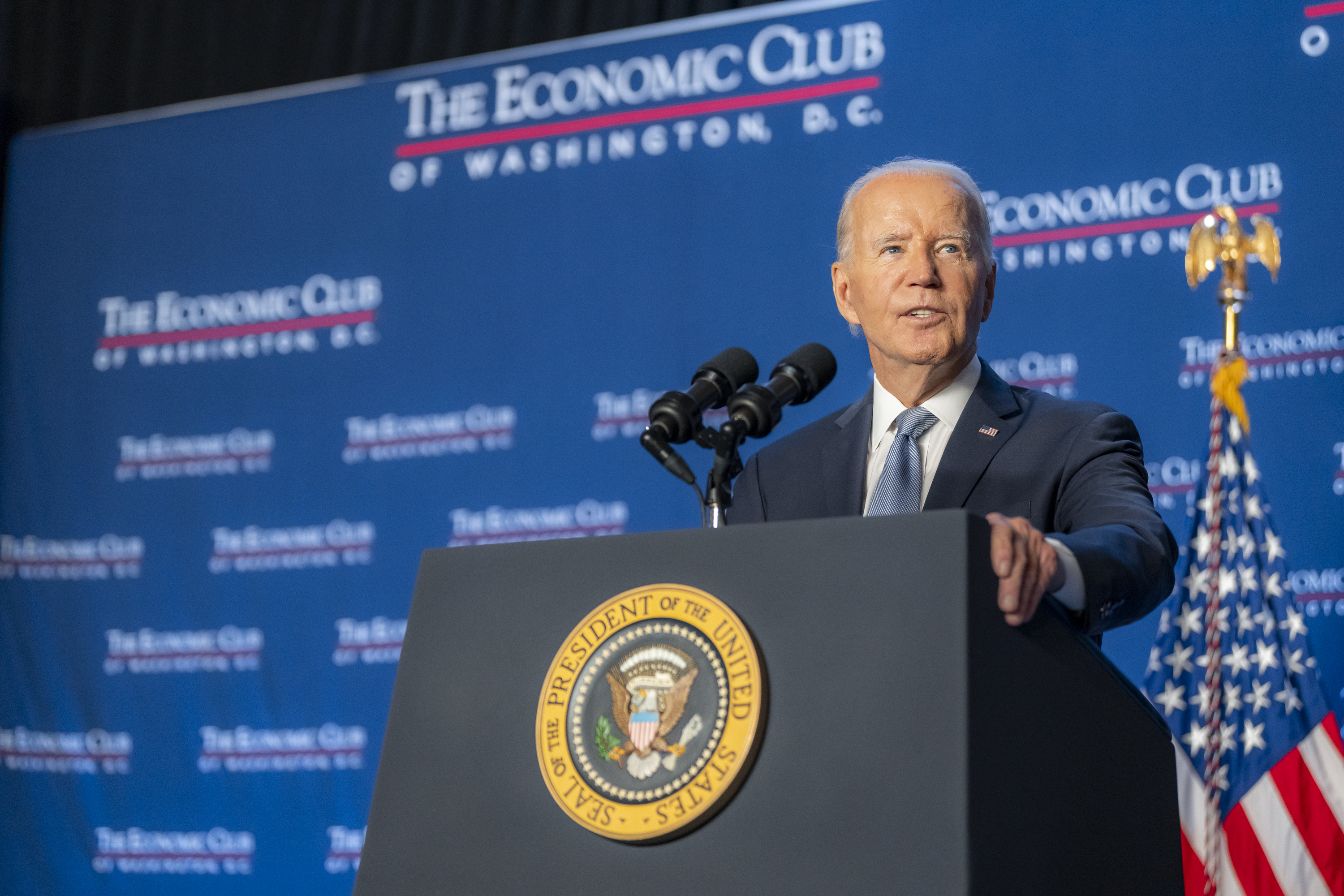
President Joe Biden delivers remarks to the Economic Club of Washington, D.C. in September 2024

The Economic Club hosts ten to twelve "signature" speaker events each year, generally organized around a breakfast, lunch, or dinner. In 2019, such events drew an average of 400 and a high of 800 members and guests, the latter sometimes including members of Congress, other U.S. political leaders, and foreign ambassadors. In the 2010s, speakers included the Presidents of the United States, Colombia, and Panama; the Prime Ministers of Finland, Israel and Singapore; a former Prime Minister of Great Britain; Speakers of the U.S. House of Representatives; heads of the Federal Reserve Board. The club has also hosted every Secretary of the Treasury since 1986; other Cabinet members and government officials; and leaders of Fortune Global 100 corporations.

=== Other events ===
The Club also hosts smaller events.

"Executive Conversations", attended by about 50 to 100 members, are intended to foster conversations with speakers and members about subjects of compelling interest to the United States’ business community. "Global Executive Conversations" are similar events organized around international topics, including foreign relations and intercontinental business. Such events are typically are closed to the media.

The Club's Global Initiative events aim to expand interaction between political and business leaders from other nations with the political, diplomatic, and opinion-leading business community in Washington, D.C., and the surrounding area, with an emphasis on economic development.

The Club helps up to 10 members per season to host dinner parties of 10 to 20 members at their homes and offices for topic-driven discussions.

The Club also hosts member-led topic-driven virtual forums on industry, political, and personal topics relevant to current world events.

== Education programs ==
The Club provides scholarships, internships, mentoring, alumni engagement, academic enrichment opportunities, and graduate-level fellowships to students who live in DC and graduate from one of the participating public or charter schools.

Among them is the David M. Rubenstein/Economic Club of Washington, D.C. Scholarship for college-bound graduates of DC public and public charter high schools. Each year, more than 50 students receive $20,000 apiece. As of 2026, this program, endowed by Rubenstein, has awarded nearly $13 million to 811 people. Rubenstein scholars may apply for a $10,000 Vernon E. Jordan, Jr. Fellowship Award to pursue higher education, based on demonstrated leadership, engagement in Economic Club activities, academic merit, history of community service, and potential for the student’s graduate education to contribute to the community and the goals of the Scholars to Leaders program.
