= 2004–05 Seattle SuperSonics season =

NBA professional basketball team season

- Division champions
- Head coach: Nate McMillan
- General manager: Rick Sund
- Owner: Howard Schultz
- Arena: KeyArena at Seattle Center

Results
- Record: 52–30 (.634)
- Place: Division: 1st (Northwest); Conference: 3rd (Western)
- Playoff finish: Conference Semifinals (lost to Spurs 2–4)
- Stats at Basketball Reference

Local media
- Television: KING-TV; KONG; FSN Northwest
- Radio: KJR

The 2004–05 Seattle SuperSonics season was the SuperSonics' 38th season in the National Basketball Association (NBA). After losing their season opener to the Los Angeles Clippers 114–84 on November 3, the Sonics went on a nine-game winning streak as they won 17 of their first 20 games. Despite losing eight of their final ten games, the Sonics finished first place in the Northwest Division with a solid 52–30 record, marking their first 50-plus win season since 1998, and first playoff appearance since 2002. Ray Allen led the team averaging 23.9 points per game as he, and Rashard Lewis were both voted to play in the 2005 NBA All-Star Game in Denver. In the first round of the playoffs, the Sonics defeated the Sacramento Kings in five games, but would lose in the second round to the eventual NBA champion San Antonio Spurs in six games. This season marked their final playoff appearance and victory as the SuperSonics, as their next playoff appearance would come in 2010, after relocating to Oklahoma City in 2008 to become the Thunder. Following the season, head coach Nate McMillan left for the Portland Trail Blazers, and Antonio Daniels signed as a free agent with the Washington Wizards.

For the season, they added new yellow alternate road uniforms that remained in use until 2008.

== Draft picks ==
Round	Pick	Player	Position	Nationality	College/school
1	12	Robert Swift	C	United States	Bakersfield HS (CA)
2	35	Andre Emmett	SG/SF	United States	Texas Tech
2	41	David Young	SF/SG	United States	North Carolina Central

== Roster ==
2004–05 Seattle SuperSonics roster
Players

Pos.	No.	Player	Height	Weight	DOB	From
SG	34	Ray Allen	6 ft 5 in (1.96 m)	205 lb (93 kg)	1975-07-20	Connecticut
PG	24	Mateen Cleaves	6 ft 2 in (1.88 m)	205 lb (93 kg)	1977-09-07	Michigan State
C	4	Nick Collison	6 ft 10 in (2.08 m)	255 lb (116 kg)	1980-10-26	Kansas
PG	33	Antonio Daniels	6 ft 4 in (1.93 m)	195 lb (88 kg)	1975-03-19	Bowling Green
PF	30	Reggie Evans	6 ft 8 in (2.03 m)	245 lb (111 kg)	1980-05-18	Iowa
C	21	Danny Fortson	6 ft 7 in (2.01 m)	260 lb (118 kg)	1976-03-27	Cincinnati
C	13	Jerome James	7 ft 1 in (2.16 m)	285 lb (129 kg)	1975-11-17	Florida A&M
SF	7	Rashard Lewis	6 ft 10 in (2.08 m)	235 lb (107 kg)	1979-08-08	Alief Elsik HS (TX)
SG	22	Flip Murray	6 ft 3 in (1.91 m)	200 lb (91 kg)	1979-07-29	Shaw
C	9	Vitaly Potapenko	6 ft 10 in (2.08 m)	280 lb (127 kg)	1975-03-21	Wright State
PF	77	Vladimir Radmanović	6 ft 10 in (2.08 m)	235 lb (107 kg)	1980-11-19	Serbia and Montenegro
PG	8	Luke Ridnour	6 ft 2 in (1.88 m)	175 lb (79 kg)	1981-02-13	Oregon
C	31	Robert Swift	7 ft 1 in (2.16 m)	245 lb (111 kg)	1985-12-03	Bakersfield HS (CA)
SF	21	Damien Wilkins	6 ft 6 in (1.98 m)	225 lb (102 kg)	1980-01-11	Georgia

Coaches
Head coach
- Nate McMillan
Assistant(s)
- Dwane Casey
- Dwight Daub
- Dean Demopoulos
- Bob Weiss

Legend
- (DP) Unsigned draft pick
- (FA) Free agent
- (S) Suspended
- Injured

Roster
Updated: November 5, 2004

== Regular season ==
=== Season standings ===
Northwest Division	W	L	PCT	GB	Home	Road	Div
y-Seattle SuperSonics	52	30	.634	–	26–15	26–15	11–5
x-Denver Nuggets	49	33	.598	3	31–10	18–23	9–7
e-Minnesota Timberwolves	44	38	.537	8	24–17	20–21	10–6
e-Portland Trail Blazers	27	55	.329	25	18–23	9–32	4–12
e-Utah Jazz	26	56	.317	26	18–23	8–33	6–10

#	Western Conference				
#	Team	W	L	PCT	GB
1	z-Phoenix Suns	62	20	.756	—
2	y-San Antonio Spurs	59	23	.720	3
3	y-Seattle SuperSonics	52	30	.634	10
4	x-Dallas Mavericks	58	24	.707	4
5	x-Houston Rockets	51	31	.622	11
6	x-Sacramento Kings	50	32	.610	12
7	x-Denver Nuggets	49	33	.598	13
8	x-Memphis Grizzlies	45	37	.549	17
9	e-Minnesota Timberwolves	44	38	.537	18
10	e-Los Angeles Clippers	37	45	.451	25
11	e-Los Angeles Lakers	34	48	.415	28
12	e-Golden State Warriors	34	48	.415	28
13	e-Portland Trail Blazers	27	55	.329	35
14	e-Utah Jazz	26	56	.317	36
15	e-New Orleans Hornets	18	64	.220	44

=== Game log ===
2004–05 game log
Total: 52–30 (home: 26–15; road: 26–15)
November: 13–3 (home: 7–0; road: 6–3)

Game	Date	Team	Score	High points	High rebounds	High assists	Location Attendance	Record
1	November 3	@ L.A. Clippers	L 84–114	Rashard Lewis (24)	Reggie Evans (6)	Ray Allen (5)	Staples Center; 13,371	0–1
2	November 5	Atlanta	W 106–85	Ray Allen (25)	Reggie Evans (9)	Luke Ridnour (6)	KeyArena; 16,103	1–1
3	November 7	San Antonio	W 113–94	Rashard Lewis (27)	Danny Fortson (13)	Luke Ridnour (6)	KeyArena; 15,891	2–1
4	November 9	@ Denver	W 108–88	Ray Allen (30)	Reggie Evans (14)	Luke Ridnour (11)	Pepsi Center; 12,962	3–1
5	November 10	Sacramento	W 108–78	Ray Allen (20)	Danny Fortson (13)	Antonio Daniels (6)	KeyArena; 14,355	4–1
6	November 12	Toronto	W 88–87	Ray Allen (29)	Reggie Evans (16)	Allen, Ridnour (7)	KeyArena; 15,702	5–1
7	November 14	Memphis	W 118–113	Ray Allen (34)	Rashard Lewis (12)	Luke Ridnour (8)	KeyArena; 12,302	6–1
8	November 16	@ Philadelphia	W 103–95	Ray Allen (37)	Reggie Evans (11)	Luke Ridnour (10)	Wachovia Center; 15,589	7–1
9	November 17	@ New Jersey	W 79–68	Rashard Lewis (17)	Reggie Evans (7)	Antonio Daniels (4)	Continental Airlines Arena; 12,127	8–1
10	November 19	@ Toronto	W 101–94	Rashard Lewis (27)	Reggie Evans (11)	Ray Allen (6)	Air Canada Centre; 16,886	9–1
11	November 21	@ Boston	L 83–102	Ray Allen (21)	Reggie Evans (8)	Ray Allen (6)	FleetCenter; 15,410	9–2
12	November 23	@ Minnesota	W 103–92	Rashard Lewis (27)	Reggie Evans (9)	Antonio Daniels (11)	Target Center; 16,129	10–2
13	November 24	@ Memphis	W 93–84	Rashard Lewis (27)	Rashard Lewis (11)	Allen, Ridnour (5)	FedExForum; 15,542	11–2
14	November 26	New Jersey	W 92–79	Danny Fortson (20)	Reggie Evans (11)	Luke Ridnour (5)	KeyArena; 17,072	12–2
15	November 28	Indiana	W 103–95	Rashard Lewis (22)	Nick Collison (9)	Ray Allen (9)	KeyArena; 14,808	13–2
16	November 30	@ Portland	L 94–100	Rashard Lewis (29)	Reggie Evans (10)	Luke Ridnour (10)	Rose Garden; 15,128	13–3

December: 9–3 (home: 4–3; road: 5–0)

Game	Date	Team	Score	High points	High rebounds	High assists	Location Attendance	Record
17	December 1	Utah	W 129–119 (OT)	Ray Allen (38)	Danny Fortson (9)	Luke Ridnour (10)	KeyArena; 16,066	14–3
18	December 4	Portland	W 99–89	Radmanović, Lewis (20)	Vladimir Radmanović (10)	Antonio Daniels (6)	KeyArena; 17,072	15–3
19	December 8	@ San Antonio	W 102–96	Ray Allen (29)	Vladimir Radmanović (7)	Antonio Daniels (4)	SBC Center; 18,797	16–3
20	December 9	@ Dallas	W 107–102	Rashard Lewis (25)	Lewis, Evans (9)	Luke Ridnour (7)	American Airlines Center; 19,733	17–3
21	December 11	Boston	L 84–98	Rashard Lewis (19)	Danny Fortson (11)	Ray Allen (6)	KeyArena; 17,072	17–4
22	December 14	L.A. Lakers	W 108–93	Rashard Lewis (37)	Lewis, Radmanović (7)	Luke Ridnour (11)	KeyArena; 17,072	18–4
23	December 17	Phoenix	L 110–112	Ray Allen (32)	Reggie Evans (14)	Luke Ridnour (9)	KeyArena; 17,072	18–5
24	December 22	Denver	W 98–83	Rashard Lewis (21)	Reggie Evans (12)	Luke Ridnour (5)	KeyArena; 17,072	19–5
25	December 27	@ Utah	W 98–88	Rashard Lewis (22)	Nick Collison (7)	Luke Ridnour (6)	Delta Center; 19,911	20–5
26	December 28	Philadelphia	L 107–114	Ray Allen (32)	Fortson, Lewis, Collison (6)	Luke Ridnour (9)	KeyArena; 17,072	20–6
27	December 30	@ Atlanta	W 94–79	Ray Allen (20)	Nick Collison (11)	Luke Ridnour (5)	Philips Arena; 13,336	21–6
28	December 31	@ Charlotte	W 103–97	Rashard Lewis (27)	Reggie Evans (10)	Daniels, Ridnour (7)	Charlotte Coliseum; 13,696	22–6

January: 8–7 (home: 5–3; road: 3–4)

Game	Date	Team	Score	High points	High rebounds	High assists	Location Attendance	Record
29	January 3	@ Miami	W 98–96	Ray Allen (35)	Rashard Lewis (13)	Luke Ridnour (7)	American Airlines Arena; 20,284	23–6
30	January 5	@ Orlando	L 87–105	Ray Allen (30)	Rashard Lewis (11)	Luke Ridnour (5)	TD Waterhouse Centre; 13,305	23–7
31	January 6	@ Washington	L 97–106	Rashard Lewis (35)	Rashard Lewis (11)	Luke Ridnour (10)	MCI Center; 16,230	23–8
32	January 9	Miami	W 108–98	Vladimir Radmanović (27)	Danny Fortson (10)	Daniels, Allen, Ridnour (7)	KeyArena; 17,072	24–8
33	January 11	L.A. Clippers	W 104–99	Ray Allen (31)	Reggie Evans (9)	Luke Ridnour (11)	KeyArena; 15,001	25–8
34	January 12	@ L.A. Clippers	L 92–103	Ray Allen (22)	Reggie Evans (10)	Ray Allen (8)	Staples Center; 15,802	25–9
35	January 14	Golden State	W 103–84	Ray Allen (22)	Danny Fortson (11)	Daniels, Ridnour (6)	KeyArena; 16,519	26–9
36	January 16	Cleveland	W 105–97	Ray Allen (27)	Vladimir Radmanović (11)	Antonio Daniels (8)	KeyArena; 17,072	27–9
37	January 18	Denver	L 110–116 (OT)	Vladimir Radmanović (25)	Reggie Evans (10)	Luke Ridnour (8)	KeyArena; 15,555	27–10
38	January 21	Minnesota	L 107–112	Ray Allen (25)	Vladimir Radmanović (10)	Allen, Daniels (4)	KeyArena; 17,072	27–11
39	January 23	Utah	W 122–105	Rashard Lewis (36)	Reggie Evans (10)	Antonio Daniels (8)	KeyArena; 16,823	28–11
40	January 25	@ L.A. Lakers	W 104–93	Vladimir Radmanović (26)	Reggie Evans (13)	Luke Ridnour (7)	Staples Center; 18,997	29–11
41	January 26	@ Utah	L 100–109	Ray Allen (27)	Nick Collison (8)	Luke Ridnour (4)	Delta Center; 18,821	29–12
42	January 28	@ Golden State	W 88–85	Ray Allen (26)	Reggie Evans (17)	Allen, Daniels (3)	The Arena in Oakland; 18,821	30–12
43	January 31	San Antonio	L 84–103	Daniels, Radmanović, Murray (13)	James, Lewis, Evans (6)	Antonio Daniels (5)	KeyArena; 17,072	30–13

February: 8–3 (home: 4–2; road: 4–1)

Game	Date	Team	Score	High points	High rebounds	High assists	Location Attendance	Record
44	February 1	@ Sacramento	W 106–101	Rashard Lewis (24)	Reggie Evans (15)	Luke Ridnour (5)	ARCO Arena; 17,317	31–13
45	February 5	Charlotte	W 113–99	Ray Allen (25)	Reggie Evans (21)	Luke Ridnour (8)	KeyArena; 16,901	32–13
46	February 8	New Orleans	W 108–91	Ray Allen (26)	Reggie Evans (14)	Luke Ridnour (7)	KeyArena; 15,482	33–13
47	February 10	Sacramento	W 115–107	Ray Allen (34)	Reggie Evans (12)	Luke Ridnour (5)	KeyArena; 16,629	34–13
48	February 11	@ Phoenix	W 113–105	Rashard Lewis (23)	Reggie Evans (11)	Luke Ridnour (5)	America West Arena; 18,422	35–13
49	February 13	Dallas	L 92–95	Rashard Lewis (18)	Reggie Evans (12)	Luke Ridnour (8)	KeyArena; 17,072	35–14
50	February 16	Golden State	L 110–117	Ray Allen (26)	Nick Collison (12)	Ray Allen (7)	KeyArena; 15,705	35–15
All-Star Break
51	February 22	@ Houston	W 87–85	Ray Allen (29)	Reggie Evans (11)	Luke Ridnour (7)	Toyota Center; 17,239	36–15
52	February 23	@ New Orleans	W 103–85	Rashard Lewis (26)	Reggie Evans (14)	Luke Ridnour (9)	New Orleans Arena; 12,771	37–15
53	February 25	Minnesota	W 98–88	Ray Allen (32)	Vitaly Potapenko (8)	Ray Allen (6)	KeyArena; 17,072	38–15
54	February 27	@ Milwaukee	L 73–99	Ray Allen (16)	Reggie Evans (12)	Luke Ridnour (3)	Bradley Center; 17,112	38–16

March: 11–6 (home: 4–4; road: 7–2)

Game	Date	Team	Score	High points	High rebounds	High assists	Location Attendance	Record
55	March 1	@ Indiana	W 101–93	Rashard Lewis (30)	Reggie Evans (12)	Daniels, Ridnour (4)	Conseco Fieldhouse; 14,971	39–16
56	March 2	@ Cleveland	W 103–86	Ray Allen (31)	Radmanović, Fortson (7)	Luke Ridnour (5)	Gund Arena; 17,522	40–16
57	March 4	Detroit	W 95–87	Rashard Lewis (18)	Reggie Evans (12)	Allen, Ridnour (6)	KeyArena; 17,072	41–16
58	March 6	Phoenix	L 99–110	Ray Allen (27)	Rashard Lewis (11)	Luke Ridnour (4)	KeyArena; 17,072	41–17
59	March 8	Houston	L 95–97	Ray Allen (32)	Reggie Evans (8)	Luke Ridnour (12)	KeyArena; 17,072	41–18
60	March 11	Chicago	L 97–100	Rashard Lewis (27)	Reggie Evans (11)	Luke Ridnour (6)	KeyArena; 17,072	41–19
61	March 13	@ New York	W 90–80	Rashard Lewis (23)	Reggie Evans (16)	Antonio Daniels (7)	Madison Square Garden; 19,763	42–19
62	March 15	@ Chicago	W 99–93	Rashard Lewis (30)	Reggie Evans (19)	Ray Allen (7)	United Center; 21,762	43–19
63	March 16	@ Detroit	L 95–102	Rashard Lewis (26)	Allen, Radmanović (6)	Luke Ridnour (5)	The Palace of Auburn Hills; 22,076	43–20
64	March 18	Orlando	W 98–90	Ray Allen (38)	Nick Collison (10)	Luke Ridnour (6)	KeyArena; 17,072	44–20
65	March 20	@ L.A. Lakers	W 102–100	Rashard Lewis (27)	Rashard Lewis (11)	Luke Ridnour (7)	Staples Center; 18,997	45–20
66	March 22	Milwaukee	W 92–84	Rashard Lewis (29)	Nick Collison (7)	Luke Ridnour (9)	KeyArena; 16,197	46–20
67	March 24	@ Portland	W 96–91	Damien Wilkins (21)	Collison, Evans (9)	Reggie Evans (4)	Rose Garden; 17,019	47–20
68	March 25	New York	W 109–101 (OT)	Ray Allen (40)	Reggie Evans (10)	Antonio Daniels (7)	KeyArena; 17,072	48–20
69	March 27	Washington	L 94–95	Ray Allen (27)	Allen, Evans, Collison (8)	Luke Ridnour (4)	KeyArena; 16,333	48–21
70	March 29	@ Memphis	W 102–99	Allen, James (22)	Reggie Evans (13)	Luke Ridnour (9)	FedExForum; 17,256	49–21
71	March 30	@ San Antonio	L 76–89	Flip Murray (17)	Reggie Evans (12)	Luke Ridnour (2)	SBC Center; 18,797	49–22

April: 3–8 (home: 2–3; road: 1–5)

Game	Date	Team	Score	High points	High rebounds	High assists	Location Attendance	Record
72	April 1	Portland	W 89–87	Ray Allen (19)	Reggie Evans (13)	Luke Ridnour (9)	KeyArena; 17,072	50–22
73	April 3	@ Golden State	L 92–101	Ray Allen (27)	Ray Allen (9)	Allen, Daniels (5)	The Arena in Oakland; 17,296	50–23
74	April 5	@ Sacramento	L 101–122	Ray Allen (23)	Reggie Evans (12)	Luke Ridnour (7)	ARCO Arena; 17,317	50–24
75	April 8	L.A. Lakers	L 94–117	Ray Allen (30)	Collison, Evans (11)	Flip Murray (7)	KeyArena; 17,072	50–25
76	April 9	@ Denver	L 105–121	Ray Allen (32)	Reggie Evans (10)	Luke Ridnour (7)	Pepsi Center; 19,751	50–26
77	April 11	Houston	L 78–90	Ray Allen (18)	Nick Collison (8)	Murray, Wilkins (4)	KeyArena; 17,072	50–27
78	April 13	Dallas	L 90–95	Ray Allen (19)	Reggie Evans (13)	Daniels, Ridnour (4)	KeyArena; 16,502	50–28
79	April 15	New Orleans	W 97–72	Ray Allen (32)	Nick Collison (10)	Ray Allen (7)	KeyArena; 17,072	51–28
80	April 17	@ Minnesota	W 109–94	Ray Allen (34)	Ray Allen (10)	Luke Ridnour (11)	Target Center; 17,779	52–28
81	April 19	@ Dallas	L 96–101	Allen, Lewis (21)	Collison, Evans (9)	Luke Ridnour (8)	American Airlines Center; 20,534	52–29
82	April 20	@ Houston	L 78–106	Flip Murray (22)	Nick Collison (9)	Luke Ridnour (8)	Toyota Center; 18,194	52–30

2004–05 season schedule

== Playoffs ==
2005 playoff game log
First Round: 4–1 (home: 3–0; road: 1–1)

Game	Date	Team	Score	High points	High rebounds	High assists	Location Attendance	Series
1	April 23	Sacramento	W 87–82	Ray Allen (28)	Evans, James (15)	Daniels, Ridnour (4)	KeyArena; 17,072	1–0
2	April 26	Sacramento	W 105–93	Ray Allen (26)	Jerome James (9)	Allen, Ridnour (6)	KeyArena; 17,072	2–0
3	April 29	@ Sacramento	L 104–116	Ray Allen (33)	Jerome James (9)	Allen, Ridnour (5)	ARCO Arena; 17,317	2–1
4	May 1	@ Sacramento	W 115–102	Ray Allen (45)	James, Lewis (8)	Allen, Daniels (6)	ARCO Arena; 17,317	3–1
5	May 3	Sacramento	W 122–118	Ray Allen (30)	Nick Collison (9)	Antonio Daniels (8)	KeyArena; 17,072	4–1

Conference Semifinals: 2–4 (home: 2–1; road: 0–3)

Game	Date	Team	Score	High points	High rebounds	High assists	Location Attendance	Series
1	May 8	@ San Antonio	L 81–103	Rashard Lewis (19)	Collison, Evans (7)	Luke Ridnour (4)	SBC Center; 18,797	0–1
2	May 10	@ San Antonio	L 91–108	Ray Allen (25)	Reggie Evans (12)	Antonio Daniels (6)	SBC Center; 18,797	0–2
3	May 12	San Antonio	W 92–91	Ray Allen (20)	Rashard Lewis (10)	Ray Allen (7)	KeyArena; 17,072	1–2
4	May 15	San Antonio	W 101–89	Ray Allen (32)	three players tied (6)	Antonio Daniels (7)	KeyArena; 17,072	2–2
5	May 17	@ San Antonio	L 90–103	Ray Allen (19)	Danny Fortson (9)	Ray Allen (6)	SBC Center; 18,797	2–3
6	May 19	San Antonio	L 96–98	Ray Allen (25)	Reggie Evans (9)	Antonio Daniels (5)	KeyArena; 17,072	2–4

2005 schedule

== Player statistics ==
Legend
GP	Games played	GS	Games started	MPG	Minutes per game
FG%	Field-goal percentage	3P%	3-point field-goal percentage	FT%	Free-throw percentage
RPG	Rebounds per game	APG	Assists per game	SPG	Steals per game
BPG	Blocks per game	PPG	Points per game

=== Season ===
Player	GP	GS	MPG	FG%	3P%	FT%	RPG	APG	SPG	BPG	PPG
Ray Allen	78	78	39.3	.428	.376	.883	4.4	3.7	1.1	.1	23.9
Mateen Cleaves	14	0	4.6	.357	.000	.750	.4	.5	.1	.0	.9
Nick Collison	82	4	17.0	.537	.000	.703	4.6	.4	.4	.6	5.6
Antonio Daniels	75	2	27.0	.438	.297	.816	2.3	4.1	.7	.0	11.2
Reggie Evans	79	79	23.8	.476	.000	.534	9.3	.7	.7	.2	4.9
Danny Fortson	62	0	16.9	.522	.000	.880	5.6	.1	.2	.1	7.5
Jerome James	80	80	16.6	.509	.000	.723	3.0	.2	.3	1.4	4.9
İbrahim Kutluay	5	0	2.4	.000	.000	.000	.2	.0	.0	.0	.0
Rashard Lewis	71	71	38.0	.462	.400	.777	5.5	1.3	1.1	.9	20.5
Ronald Murray	49	6	18.0	.361	.253	.738	2.0	1.3	.6	.2	7.0
Vitaly Potapenko	33	1	10.2	.517	.000	.871	2.4	.3	.2	.1	3.5
Vladimir Radmanovic	63	0	29.5	.409	.389	.786	4.6	1.4	.9	.5	11.8
Luke Ridnour	82	82	31.4	.405	.376	.883	2.5	5.9	1.1	.3	10.0
Robert Swift	16	0	4.5	.455	.000	.556	.3	.1	.1	.4	.9
Damien Wilkins	29	7	17.9	.435	.271	.618	2.3	.9	.8	.3	6.3

=== Playoffs ===
Player	GP	GS	MPG	FG%	3P%	FT%	RPG	APG	SPG	BPG	PPG
Ray Allen	11	11	39.6	.474	.378	.889	4.3	3.9	1.3	.4	26.5
Nick Collison	11	0	19.8	.607	1.000	.630	5.0	.5	.3	.5	8.4
Antonio Daniels	11	3	30.1	.468	.286	.857	2.8	4.5	1.0	.0	13.8
Reggie Evans	11	11	18.9	.405	.000	.524	7.4	.5	.5	.3	3.7
Danny Fortson	11	0	9.5	.571	.000	.800	2.4	.0	.3	.1	3.3
Jerome James	11	11	26.8	.514	.000	.767	6.8	.5	.5	1.8	12.5
Rashard Lewis	8	8	39.0	.406	.200	.880	5.4	1.6	.4	.4	16.9
Ronald Murray	4	0	15.5	.211	.000	.571	1.5	1.3	.0	.5	3.0
Vitaly Potapenko	5	0	7.4	.500	.000	.000	1.4	.0	.0	.0	2.0
Vladimir Radmanovic	6	0	20.3	.371	.238	.500	3.0	.5	.7	.5	5.3
Luke Ridnour	11	11	34.4	.393	.235	.950	3.3	4.3	1.2	.7	9.7
Damien Wilkins	7	0	19.4	.444	.273	.444	2.6	.4	1.4	.1	5.6

== Awards and records ==
- Ray Allen, All-NBA Second Team
