= Nick Collison =

American basketball player (born 1980)

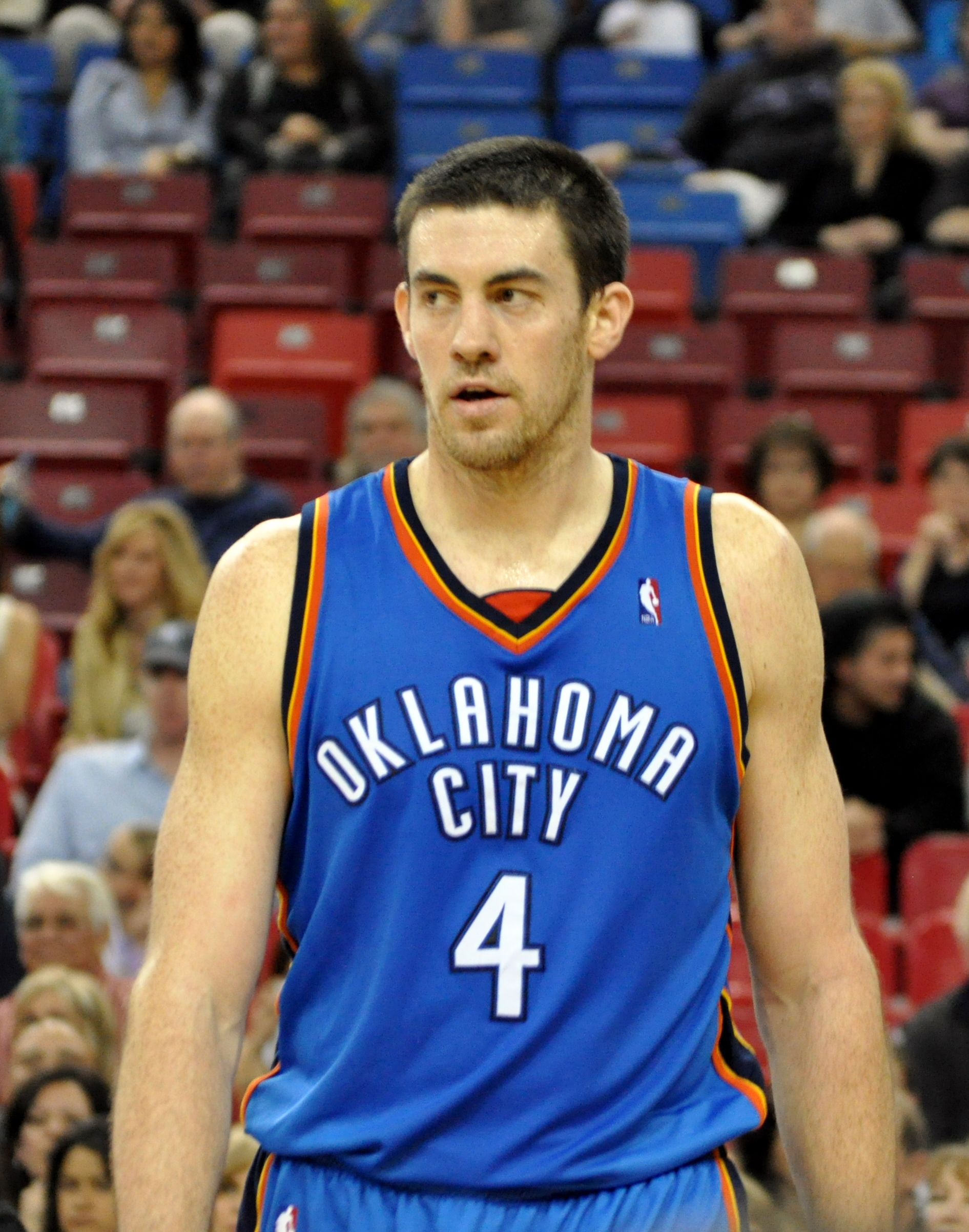
- Collison with the Oklahoma City Thunder in 2010

Oklahoma City Thunder
- Title: Special assistant to the General Manager
- League: NBA

Personal information
- Born: October 26, 1980 (age 46) Orange City, Iowa, U.S.
- Listed height: 6 ft 10 in (2.08 m)
- Listed weight: 255 lb (116 kg)

Career information
- High school: Iowa Falls (Iowa Falls, Iowa)
- College: Kansas (1999–2003)
- NBA draft: 2003: 1st round, 12th overall pick
- Drafted by: Seattle SuperSonics
- Playing career: 2003–2018
- Position: Power forward / center
- Number: 4

Career history
- 2003–2018: Seattle SuperSonics / Oklahoma City Thunder

Career highlights
- As a player: No. 4 retired by Oklahoma City Thunder; NABC Player of the Year (2003); Consensus first-team All-American (2003); Big 12 Player of the Year (2003); 2× First-team All-Big 12 (2001, 2003); Second-team All-Big 12 (2002); No. 4 retired by Kansas Jayhawks; Second-team Parade All-American (1999); McDonald's All-American (1999); Co–Iowa Mr. Basketball (1999); As an executive: NBA champion (2025)

Career statistics
- Points: 5,359 (5.9 ppg)
- Rebounds: 4,701 (5.2 rpg)
- Assists: 939 (1.0 apg)
- Stats at NBA.com
- Stats at Basketball Reference
Medals
Men's basketball
Representing United States
FIBA Americas Championship
Gold medal – first place	2003 San Juan	Team competition
FIBA Americas U18 Championship
Gold medal – first place	1998 Puerto Plata	Team competition
FIBA U19 World Championship
Silver medal – second place	1999 Lisbon	Team competition
FIBA U21 World Championship
Gold medal – first place	2001 Saitama	Team competition

Nicholas John Collison (born October 26, 1980) is an American former professional basketball player who is a special assistant for the Oklahoma City Thunder of the National Basketball Association (NBA). He spent his entire career with the organization originally known as the Seattle SuperSonics, which became the Thunder in 2008. Collison was drafted by the SuperSonics in the first round of the 2003 NBA draft and retired as a member of the Thunder in 2018. As a college player, he went to two Final Fours as a member of the Kansas Jayhawks. Collison won his first NBA Championship in 2025 as an executive for the Thunder.

== Early life ==
Collison was born on October 26, 1980, in Orange City, Iowa and grew up in Fort Dodge and Iowa Falls. He attended Iowa Falls High School and was a McDonald's All-American in 1999.

== College career ==
Teaming with fellow Iowan Kirk Hinrich to form one of the best duos in college basketball, Collison helped the University of Kansas reach two consecutive Final Fours (2002 and 2003). Collison finished his college career as the leading scorer in the history of the Big 12 Conference (a mark since surpassed). In 2003, the Jayhawks lost to Carmelo Anthony and the Syracuse Orange in the National Championship game, 81–78. Collison also played for the United States national team at the 2002 FIBA World Championship.

On November 25, 2003, Collison's No. 4 jersey was retired by the Jayhawks during halftime of the Kansas-Michigan State game in recognition of his achievements over his four-year career (2002–03 Player of the Year, consensus first-team All-America, Big 12 Player of the Year).

== Professional career ==
=== Seattle SuperSonics / Oklahoma City Thunder (2003–2018) ===
==== Draft year injury and relocation (2003–2008) ====
Collison was selected by the Seattle SuperSonics with the 12th overall pick in the 2003 NBA draft but missed the 2003–04 season with injuries to both shoulders. He made his NBA debut on November 3, 2004, recording two points, five rebounds, and two assists in a 114–84 loss to the Los Angeles Clippers. Collison appeared in all 82 games in the 2004–05 season, averaging 5.6 points, 4.6 rebounds, and 0.4 assists in 17 minutes per game. He played in all 82 games for a second time during the 2006–07 season, averaging 9.6 points, 8.1 rebounds, and 1.0 assist in 29 minutes per game. On January 9, 2007, Collison had a career-best game with 29 points and 21 rebounds in a 113–102 loss to the Phoenix Suns. In 2008, the franchise relocated to Oklahoma City and rebranded as the Thunder.

==== Finals appearance and later years (2008–2018) ====
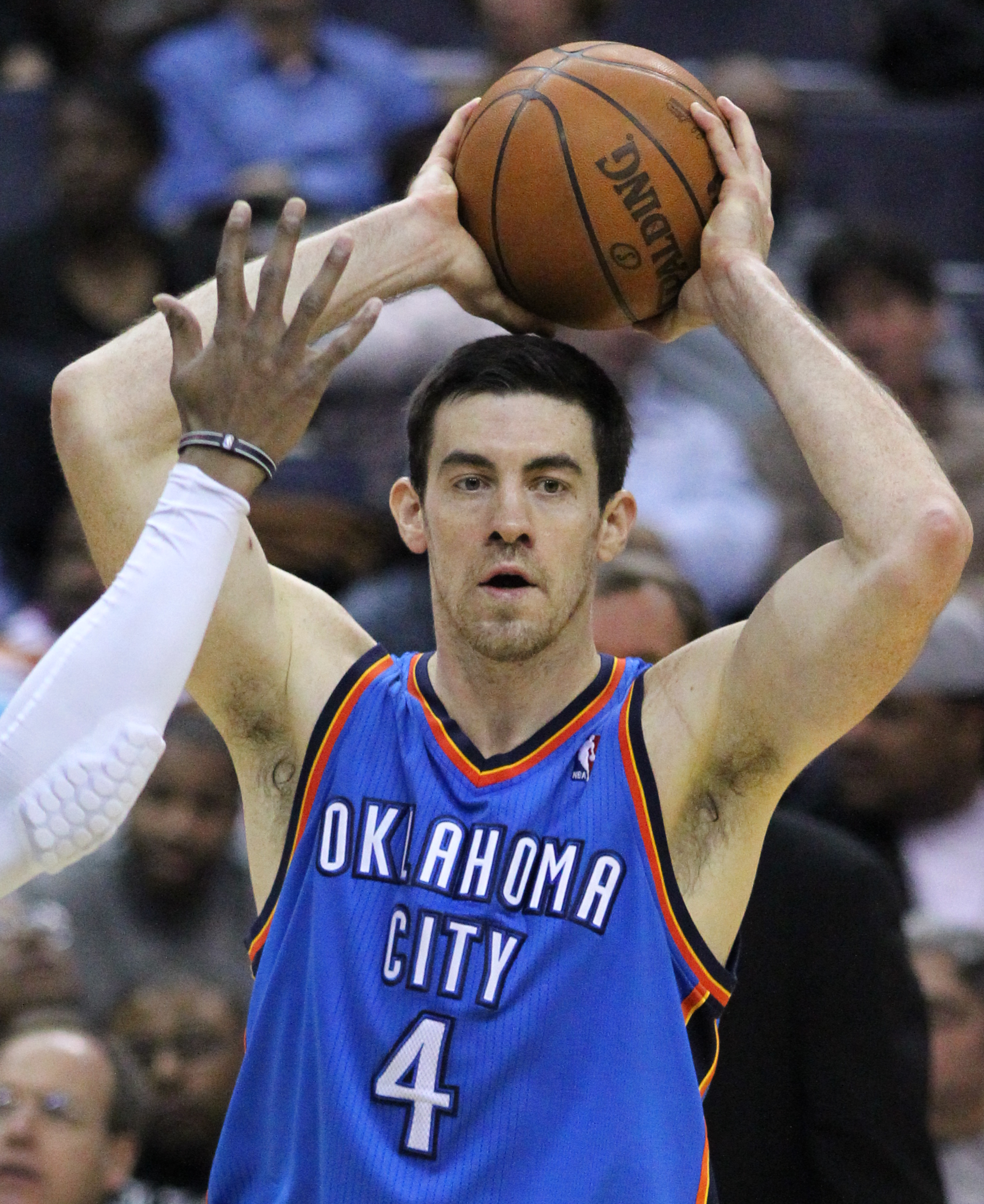
Collison in March 2011

On December 19, 2010, Collison scored a season-high 19 points and added eight rebounds in a 120–113 loss to the Phoenix Suns. In the game, he also drew his 15th charge of the season, a majority of the 22 charges the Thunder had drawn as a team to that point in the season. That postseason, on May 15, 2011, Collison helped the Thunder to a Western Conference Semifinals Game 7 105–90 victory over the Memphis Grizzlies, with eight points and a playoff career-high 12 rebounds. In the Western Conference Finals, Collison and the Thunder lost to the Dallas Mavericks in five games.

In 2012, Collison helped the Thunder make the leap to the next level and reach the NBA Finals, where they lost in five games to the Miami Heat, who were led by Collison's fellow 2003 draftees LeBron James, Dwyane Wade, and Chris Bosh.

On February 3, 2015, Collison signed a two-year, $7.5 million contract extension with the Thunder.

On July 21, 2017, Collison re-signed with the Thunder to a one-year, minimum salary deal. His final NBA game was played on April 11, 2018, a 137–123 victory over the Memphis Grizzlies, where Collison recorded a point and a rebound.

=== Retirement ===
On May 10, 2018, Collison announced his retirement from professional basketball. On January 12, 2019, the Thunder announced that Collison's No. 4 jersey would be retired on March 20, becoming the first number retired by the Thunder.

== Post-playing career ==
Following his retirement as a player, Collison joined the Thunder in the position of basketball operations representative. On August 10, 2021, he was promoted to the position of special assistant to the executive vice president and general manager (currently Sam Presti).

Collison won his first NBA Championship as an executive in 2025 after the Thunder defeated the Indiana Pacers in seven games.

== Personal life ==
After the Sonics relocated to Oklahoma City, Collison continued to make his home in Seattle.

Collison appeared on the cover of the 989 Sports video game NCAA Final Four 2004. The game was released on November 11, 2003, for the PlayStation 2.

Collison has three children. His younger brother, Michael, played college basketball for their father's alma mater, Briar Cliff University, in Sioux City, Iowa.

== Career statistics ==
Legend
GP	Games played	GS	Games started	MPG	Minutes per game
FG%	Field goal percentage	3P%	3-point field goal percentage	FT%	Free throw percentage
RPG	Rebounds per game	APG	Assists per game	SPG	Steals per game
BPG	Blocks per game	PPG	Points per game	**Bold**	Career high
*	Led the league

=== College ===
Year	Team	GP	GS	MPG	FG%	3P%	FT%	RPG	APG	SPG	BPG	PPG
1999–2000	Kansas	34	33	22.8	.497	.385	**.674**	6.9	1.1	1.1	.9	10.5
2000–01	Kansas	33	23	27.0	**.597**	**.400**	.625	6.7	**2.2**	1.1	1.6	14.0
2001–02	Kansas	37*	36	26.8	.592	.375	.575	8.3	1.7	1.1	**2.2**	15.6
2002–03	Kansas	**38***	**38**	**32.4**	.554	.342	.635	**10.0**	**2.2**	**1.2**	1.9	**18.5**
Career		142	130	27.4	.562	.359	.624	8.0	1.8	1.1	1.7	14.8

=== NBA ===
==== Regular season ====
Year	Team	GP	GS	MPG	FG%	3P%	FT%	RPG	APG	SPG	BPG	PPG
2004–05	Seattle	**82**	4	17.0	.537	.000	.703	4.6	.4	.4	.6	5.6
2005–06	Seattle	66	27	21.9	.525	.000	.699	5.6	1.1	.3	.5	7.5
2006–07	Seattle	**82***	**56**	**29.0**	.500	.000	**.774**	8.1	1.0	.6	**.8**	9.6
2007–08	Seattle	78	35	28.5	.502	.000	.737	**9.4**	1.4	.6	**.8**	**9.8**
2008–09	Oklahoma City	71	40	25.8	.568	.000	.721	6.9	.9	**.7**	.7	8.2
2009–10	Oklahoma City	75	5	20.8	.589	.250	.692	5.1	.5	.5	.6	5.9
2010–11	Oklahoma City	71	2	21.5	.566	–	.753	4.5	1.0	.6	.4	4.6
2011–12	Oklahoma City	63	0	20.7	.597	.000	.710	4.3	1.3	.5	.4	4.5
2012–13	Oklahoma City	81	2	19.5	.595	.000	.769	4.1	**1.5**	.6	.4	5.1
2013–14	Oklahoma City	81	0	16.7	.556	.235	.710	3.6	1.3	.4	.3	4.2
2014–15	Oklahoma City	66	2	16.7	.419	**.267**	.692	3.8	1.4	.5	.4	4.1
2015–16	Oklahoma City	59	4	11.8	.459	.000	.697	2.9	.9	.3	.3	2.1
2016–17	Oklahoma City	20	0	6.4	.609	000	.625	1.6	.5	.1	.1	1.7
2017–18	Oklahoma City	15	0	5.0	**.684**	–	.385	1.3	.3	.0	.0	2.1
Career		910	177	20.4	.534	.208	.723	5.2	1.0	.5	.5	5.9

==== Playoffs ====
Year	Team	GP	GS	MPG	FG%	3P%	FT%	RPG	APG	SPG	BPG	PPG
2005	Seattle	11	0	19.8	.607	**1.000**	.630	5.0	.5	.3	.5	**8.4**
2010	Oklahoma City	6	0	21.5	.333	.000	.429	4.7	.3	.8	.2	3.2
2011	Oklahoma City	17	0	**24.3**	.632	.000	.783	**5.8**	.9	**.9**	.9	6.7
2012	Oklahoma City	**20**	0	16.6	.647	.000	.429	3.4	1.0	.6	.3	3.5
2013	Oklahoma City	11	0	16.2	.468	.000	**.917**	4.6	**1.1**	.5	**1.0**	5.0
2014	Oklahoma City	17	**2**	10.8	.414	.400	.700	2.2	.8	.2	.4	1.9
2016	Oklahoma City	9	0	8.8	**.667**	.000	.500	1.2	.6	**.9**	.0	1.0
Career		91	2	16.8	.558	.429	.682	3.8	.8	.6	.5	4.3

== See also ==
- List of NCAA Division I men's basketball players with 2000 points and 1000 rebounds
- List of NBA players who have spent their entire career with one franchise
