= 2004–05 Dallas Mavericks season =

NBA professional basketball team season

- Head coach: Don Nelson (resigned) (42–22); Avery Johnson (16–2)
- President: Donnie Nelson
- General manager: Don Nelson
- Owner: Mark Cuban
- Arena: American Airlines Center

Results
- Record: 58–24 (.707)
- Place: Division: 2nd (Southwest); Conference: 4th (Western)
- Playoff finish: Conference Semifinals (lost to Suns 2–4)
- Stats at Basketball Reference

Local media
- Television: FSN Southwest; KTXA
- Radio: KESN

The 2004–05 Dallas Mavericks season was the Mavericks' 25th season in the National Basketball Association. During the offseason, the Mavericks acquired Jason Terry from the Atlanta Hawks, and Jerry Stackhouse along with rookie Devin Harris from the Washington Wizards. The Mavericks got off to a fast start winning seven of their first eight games, holding a 35–16 record before the All-Star break. At midseason, the team acquired Keith Van Horn from the Milwaukee Bucks. However, on March 19, head coach Don Nelson stepped down and former Maverick Avery Johnson took over Nelson's duties for the remainder of the season. Under Johnson, the Mavericks won their final nine games of the season, finishing second in the Southwest Division with a 58–24 record, good for fourth place in the Western Conference. Dirk Nowitzki was selected for the 2005 NBA All-Star Game.

In the first round of the playoffs, the Mavericks lost the first two games against their in-state rival, the Houston Rockets, but managed to defeat them in seven games. The semi-finals against the top-seeded Phoenix Suns pitted Nowitzki against former teammate Steve Nash, who was named league MVP following the season. The Mavs would eventually lose the series in six games. Following the season, Michael Finley signed as a free agent with the San Antonio Spurs and Shawn Bradley retired.

For the season, the Mavs added an alternate green uniform, similar to the 1980s road uniform. They were designed by rapper Sean "P. Diddy" Combs and remained in use until 2009.

== Draft picks ==
Round	Pick	Player	Position	Nationality	College
2	50	Vassillis Spanoulis (acquired from Houston and Denver)	Guard	Greece	Greece

== Roster ==
2004–05 Dallas Mavericks roster
Players

Pos.	No.	Player	Height	Weight	DOB	From
SG	9	Tariq Abdul-Wahad (IN)	6 ft 6 in (1.98 m)	223 lb (101 kg)	1974-11-03	San José State
PG	10	Darrell Armstrong	6 ft 0 in (1.83 m)	170 lb (77 kg)	1968-06-22	Fayetteville State
C	44	Shawn Bradley	7 ft 6 in (2.29 m)	235 lb (107 kg)	1972-03-22	BYU
C	25	Erick Dampier	6 ft 11 in (2.11 m)	265 lb (120 kg)	1975-07-14	Mississippi State
SG	6	Marquis Daniels	6 ft 6 in (1.98 m)	200 lb (91 kg)	1981-01-07	Auburn
SG	4	Michael Finley	6 ft 7 in (2.01 m)	225 lb (102 kg)	1973-03-06	Wisconsin
PG	34	Devin Harris	6 ft 3 in (1.91 m)	192 lb (87 kg)	1983-02-27	Wisconsin
PF	50	Alan Henderson	6 ft 9 in (2.06 m)	235 lb (107 kg)	1972-12-02	Indiana
SF	5	Josh Howard	6 ft 7 in (2.01 m)	210 lb (95 kg)	1980-04-28	Wake Forest
C	28	D.J. Mbenga	7 ft 0 in (2.13 m)	245 lb (111 kg)	1980-12-30	DR Congo
PF	41	Dirk Nowitzki	7 ft 0 in (2.13 m)	245 lb (111 kg)	1978-06-19	Germany
C	24	Pavel Podkolzin	7 ft 5 in (2.26 m)	260 lb (118 kg)	1985-01-15	Russia
SG	42	Jerry Stackhouse	6 ft 6 in (1.98 m)	218 lb (99 kg)	1974-11-05	North Carolina
PG	31	Jason Terry	6 ft 2 in (1.88 m)	185 lb (84 kg)	1977-09-15	Arizona
PF	2	Keith Van Horn	6 ft 10 in (2.08 m)	240 lb (109 kg)	1975-10-23	Utah

Coaches
Head coach
- Don Nelson (resigned)
- Avery Johnson
Assistant(s)
- Rolando Blackman
- Brad Davis
- Del Harris
- Charlie Parker
- Larry Riley

Legend
- (DP) Unsigned draft pick
- (FA) Free agent
- (S) Suspended
- Injured

Roster
Updated: March 1, 2005

=== Roster notes ===
- Center Shawn Bradley also holds American citizenship, but he played for the German national team and was born in Germany.
- Shooting guard Tariq Abdul-Wahad missed the entire season due to tendinitis in his left knee.

== Regular season ==
=== Standings ===
Southwest Division	W	L	PCT	GB	Home	Road	Div
y-San Antonio Spurs	59	23	.720	–	38–3	21–20	10–6
x-Dallas Mavericks	58	24	.707	1	29–12	29–12	11–5
x-Houston Rockets	51	31	.622	8	26–15	25–16	10–6
x-Memphis Grizzlies	45	37	.549	14	26–15	19–22	7–9
e-New Orleans Hornets	18	64	.220	41	11–30	7–34	2–14

#	Western Conference				
#	Team	W	L	PCT	GB
1	z-Phoenix Suns	62	20	.756	—
2	y-San Antonio Spurs	59	23	.720	3
3	y-Seattle SuperSonics	52	30	.634	10
4	x-Dallas Mavericks	58	24	.707	4
5	x-Houston Rockets	51	31	.622	11
6	x-Sacramento Kings	50	32	.610	12
7	x-Denver Nuggets	49	33	.598	13
8	x-Memphis Grizzlies	45	37	.549	17
9	e-Minnesota Timberwolves	44	38	.537	18
10	e-Los Angeles Clippers	37	45	.451	25
11	e-Los Angeles Lakers	34	48	.415	28
12	e-Golden State Warriors	34	48	.415	28
13	e-Portland Trail Blazers	27	55	.329	35
14	e-Utah Jazz	26	56	.317	36
15	e-New Orleans Hornets	18	64	.220	44

=== Game log ===
2004–05 game log
Total: 58–24 (home: 29–12; road: 29–12)
November: 10–6 (home: 5–3; road: 5–3)

Game	Date	Team	Score	High points	High rebounds	High assists	Location Attendance	Record
1	November 2	Sacramento	W 107–98	Dirk Nowitzki (33)	Dirk Nowitzki (10)	Devin Harris (7)	American Airlines Center; 20,041	1–0
2	November 3	@ New Orleans	W 106–91	three players tied (19)	Erick Dampier (8)	Nowitzki, Terry (5)	New Orleans Arena; 17,682	2–0
3	November 6	Memphis	W 112–88	Michael Finley (23)	Erick Dampier (18)	Josh Howard (4)	American Airlines Center; 19,796	3–0
4	November 8	Golden State	W 101–98 (OT)	Dirk Nowitzki (25)	Josh Howard (13)	five players tied (2)	American Airlines Center; 19,527	4–0
5	November 9	@ Orlando	L 84–94	Dirk Nowitzki (20)	Erick Dampier (13)	Jerry Stackhouse (3)	TD Waterhouse Centre; 13,155	4–1
6	November 11	@ Miami	W 113–93	Dirk Nowitzki (41)	Dirk Nowitzki (10)	Dirk Nowitzki (4)	American Airlines Arena; 19,985	5–1
7	November 13	@ New Jersey	W 94–78	Dirk Nowitzki (31)	Josh Howard (10)	Dirk Nowitzki (7)	Continental Airlines Arena; 12,975	6–1
8	November 14	@ Washington	W 122–113	Dirk Nowitzki (32)	Dirk Nowitzki (13)	Jason Terry (11)	MCI Center; 15,420	7–1
9	November 16	Phoenix	L 101–107	Jerry Stackhouse (21)	Dirk Nowitzki (16)	Devin Harris (6)	American Airlines Center; 20,238	7–2
10	November 19	New York	W 103–101	Dirk Nowitzki (30)	Josh Howard (13)	Jerry Stackhouse (6)	American Airlines Center; 19,658	8–2
11	November 21	@ Denver	L 82–110	Devin Harris (15)	Howard, Booth (6)	Devin Harris (5)	Pepsi Center; 15,622	8–3
12	November 22	Minnesota	L 82–83	Josh Howard (22)	Marquis Daniels (10)	Marquis Daniels (5)	American Airlines Center; 19,939	8–4
13	November 24	@ San Antonio	L 80–94	Dirk Nowitzki (23)	Dirk Nowitzki (11)	three players tied (2)	SBC Center; 18,797	8–5
14	November 26	Portland	W 92–83	Dirk Nowitzki (23)	Dirk Nowitzki (14)	Nowitzki, Daniels (5)	American Airlines Center; 20,179	9–5
15	November 27	@ Memphis	W 98–85	Dirk Nowitzki (32)	Dirk Nowitzki (18)	Jason Terry (4)	FedExForum; 18,119	10–5
16	November 30	San Antonio	L 89–107	Dirk Nowitzki (21)	Dirk Nowitzki (13)	Dirk Nowitzki (4)	American Airlines Center; 19,455	10–6

December : 9–4 (home: 4–3; road: 5–1)

Game	Date	Team	Score	High points	High rebounds	High assists	Location Attendance	Record
17	December 2	Houston	W 113–106 (OT)	Dirk Nowitzki (53)	Dirk Nowitzki (16)	Jerry Stackhouse (7)	American Airlines Center; 19,524	11–6
18	December 4	Utah	W 109–86	Dirk Nowitzki (30)	Josh Howard (10)	Jason Terry (9)	American Airlines Center; 19,845	12–6
19	December 6	Detroit	L 85–101	Dirk Nowitzki (27)	Erick Dampier (14)	Jason Terry (3)	American Airlines Center; 19,546	12–7
20	December 7	@ Minnesota	W 97–87	Dirk Nowitzki (34)	Alan Henderson (15)	Darrell Armstrong (6)	Target Center; 16,235	13–7
21	December 9	Seattle	L 102–107	Dirk Nowitzki (27)	Erick Dampier (9)	Darrell Armstrong (4)	American Airlines Center; 19,733	13–8
22	December 11	@ Houston	W 102–78	Michael Finley (26)	Dirk Nowitzki (14)	Jason Terry (5)	Toyota Center; 18,189	14–8
23	December 13	@ Chicago	W 94–93	Michael Finley (27)	Josh Howard (10)	Marquis Daniels (4)	United Center; 16,191	15–8
24	December 14	Golden State	L 107–111	Jerry Stackhouse (27)	Josh Howard (10)	three players tied (2)	American Airlines Center; 19,561	15–9
25	December 18	Atlanta	W 90–68	Dirk Nowitzki (15)	Erick Dampier (13)	Jason Terry (4)	American Airlines Center; 20,068	16–9
26	December 21	@ New York	W 123–94	Josh Howard (26)	Josh Howard (16)	Jason Terry (7)	Madison Square Garden; 19,763	17–9
27	December 22	@ Atlanta	L 100–113	three players tied (23)	Erick Dampier (8)	Michael Finley (4)	Philips Arena; 12,765	17–10
28	December 26	@ Denver	W 102–88	Dirk Nowitzki (36)	Erick Dampier (10)	Jason Terry (4)	Pepsi Center; 19,099	18–10
29	December 28	Boston	W 113–94	Dirk Nowitzki (29)	Dirk Nowitzki (11)	Jason Terry (14)	American Airlines Center; 20,499	19–10

January : 9–4 (home: 7–2; road: 2–2)

Game	Date	Team	Score	High points	High rebounds	High assists	Location Attendance	Record
30	January 2	Milwaukee	W 123–104	Dirk Nowitzki (39)	Josh Howard (13)	Jason Terry (10)	American Airlines Center; 20,067	20–10
31	January 5	L.A. Lakers	W 118–104	Jason Terry (28)	Erick Dampier (13)	Jason Terry (5)	American Airlines Center; 20,393	21–10
32	January 8	Indiana	W 121–101	Dirk Nowitzki (34)	Dirk Nowitzki (13)	Jason Terry (8)	American Airlines Center; 20,385	22–10
33	January 12	Houston	L 114–124	Dirk Nowitzki (28)	Shawn Bradley (8)	Terry, Stackhouse (7)	American Airlines Center; 20,365	22–11
34	January 14	@ San Antonio	L 95–98	Dirk Nowitzki (36)	Dirk Nowitzki (14)	Michael Finley (3)	SBC Center; 17,897	22–12
35	January 15	New Jersey	W 98–93	Dirk Nowitzki (26)	Dirk Nowitzki (12)	Jason Terry (5)	American Airlines Center; 20,270	23–12
36	January 18	Washington	W 137–120	Dirk Nowitzki (28)	Alan Henderson (12)	Jason Terry (7)	American Airlines Center; 19,653	24–12
37	January 20	L.A. Clippers	W 99–77	Dirk Nowitzki (28)	Erick Dampier (11)	Terry, Stackhouse (5)	American Airlines Center; 19,576	25–12
38	January 21	@ Charlotte	W 105–99	Finley, Nowitzki (20)	Dirk Nowitzki (9)	Jason Terry (7)	Charlotte Coliseum; 17,186	26–12
39	January 23	Denver	W 95–93	Dirk Nowitzki (35)	Erick Dampier (14)	Terry, Stackhouse (5)	American Airlines Center; 19,744	27–12
40	January 24	@ L.A. Clippers	L 87–97	Dirk Nowitzki (22)	Erick Dampier (14)	Jason Terry (8)	Staples Center; 16,642	27–13
41	January 26	@ Portland	W 95–88	Dirk Nowitzki (24)	Dirk Nowitzki (15)	Jason Terry (8)	Rose Garden Arena; 16,402	28–13
42	January 29	Philadelphia	L 89–93	Dirk Nowitzki (25)	Erick Dampier (26)	Jason Terry (7)	American Airlines Center; 20,432	28–14

February : 10–3 (home: 3–2; road: 7–1)

Game	Date	Team	Score	High points	High rebounds	High assists	Location Attendance	Record
43	February 1	Miami	W 109–104	Jerry Stackhouse (24)	Erick Dampier (14)	Jason Terry (8)	American Airlines Center; 20,465	29–14
44	February 2	@ New Orleans	W 90–82	Dirk Nowitzki (20)	Erick Dampier (14)	Jason Terry (7)	New Orleans Arena; 11,094	30–14
45	February 4	@ Indiana	L 94–95	Dirk Nowitzki (32)	Erick Dampier (14)	Finley, Nowitzki (4)	Conseco Fieldhouse; 16,739	30–15
46	February 6	@ Toronto	W 122–113	Dirk Nowitzki (30)	Erick Dampier (12)	Jason Terry (11)	Air Canada Centre; 17,896	31–15
47	February 8	Chicago	L 100–107	Dirk Nowitzki (27)	Nowitzki, Dampier (12)	Finley, Terry (6)	American Airlines Center; 20,224	31–16
48	February 11	@ Sacramento	W 115–113	Dirk Nowitzki (27)	Erick Dampier (8)	Dirk Nowitzki (7)	ARCO Arena; 17,317	32–16
49	February 13	@ Seattle	W 95–92	Dirk Nowitzki (31)	Erick Dampier (14)	three players tied (6)	KeyArena; 17,072	33–16
50	February 15	@ Golden State	W 114–107	Dirk Nowitzki (35)	Dirk Nowitzki (11)	Nowitzki, Armstrong (5)	Oakland Arena; 15,254	34–16
51	February 17	@ Phoenix	W 119–113	Michael Finley (33)	Dirk Nowitzki (16)	three players tied (4)	America West Arena; 18,422	35–16
All-Star Break
52	February 23	@ Utah	W 101–83	Dirk Nowitzki (29)	Josh Howard (9)	Devin Harris (5)	Delta Center; 18,521	36–16
53	February 24	Sacramento	W 122–113	Dirk Nowitzki (34)	Dirk Nowitzki (11)	Marquis Daniels (8)	American Airlines Center; 20,377	37–16
54	February 26	Phoenix	L 123–124	Jason Terry (27)	Dirk Nowitzki (16)	Jason Terry (7)	American Airlines Center; 20,435	37–17
55	February 28	New Orleans	W 90–86	Dirk Nowitzki (28)	Dirk Nowitzki (11)	Darrell Armstrong (5)	American Airlines Center; 19,947	38–17

March : 10–6 (home: 5–2; road: 5–4)

Game	Date	Team	Score	High points	High rebounds	High assists	Location Attendance	Record
56	March 2	@ L.A. Clippers	L 92–101	Dirk Nowitzki (25)	Alan Henderson (6)	Jason Terry (10)	Staples Center; 16,531	38–18
57	March 4	@ L.A. Lakers	L 103–108	Dirk Nowitzki (23)	Dirk Nowitzki (13)	Jason Terry (6)	Staples Center; 18,997	38–19
58	March 6	@ Houston	L 69–90	Jason Terry (20)	Van Horn, Howard (7)	Darrell Armstrong (4)	Toyota Center; 18,195	38–20
59	March 7	Toronto	W 113–105	Marquis Daniels (32)	Alan Henderson (11)	Jason Terry (6)	American Airlines Center; 19,509	39–20
60	March 10	L.A. Lakers	L 95–100	Dirk Nowitzki (25)	Dirk Nowitzki (11)	Jason Terry (6)	American Airlines Center; 20,411	39–21
61	March 11	@ Milwaukee	W 112–110	Dirk Nowitzki (29)	Dirk Nowitzki (9)	Jason Terry (5)	Bradley Center; 16,489	40–21
62	March 13	@ Minnesota	W 102–93	Jason Terry (22)	Dirk Nowitzki (10)	Jason Terry (12)	Target Center; 19,420	41–21
63	March 15	Minnesota	L 91–100	Dirk Nowitzki (21)	Dirk Nowitzki (15)	Jason Terry (7)	American Airlines Center; 20,434	41–22
64	March 17	Portland	W 98–94	Josh Howard (21)	Josh Howard (11)	Jason Terry (7)	American Airlines Center; 20,092	42–22
65	March 19	Charlotte	W 104–93	Dirk Nowitzki (33)	Finley, Bradley (10)	Jason Terry (9)	American Airlines Center; 20,331	43–22
66	March 21	New Orleans	W 103–86	Dirk Nowitzki (25)	Nowitzki, Van Horn (8)	Michael Finley (5)	American Airlines Center; 19,997	44–22
67	March 23	@ Golden State	W 109–97	Dirk Nowitzki (29)	Dirk Nowitzki (10)	Jason Terry (8)	Oakland Arena; 16,183	45–22
68	March 24	@ Sacramento	L 101–109	Dirk Nowitzki (35)	Josh Howard (10)	Nowitzki, Terry (5)	ARCO Arena; 17,317	45–23
69	March 26	Cleveland	W 117–86	Michael Finley (26)	Dirk Nowitzki (14)	Jason Terry (8)	American Airlines Center; 20,435	46–23
70	March 28	@ Detroit	W 95–88	Josh Howard (24)	Dirk Nowitzki (10)	Jason Terry (7)	The Palace of Auburn Hills; 22,076	47–23
71	March 30	@ Boston	W 112–100	Dirk Nowitzki (36)	Dirk Nowitzki (9)	Jason Terry (7)	FleetCenter; 18,624	48–23

April : 10–1 (home: 5–0; road: 5–1)

Game	Date	Team	Score	High points	High rebounds	High assists	Location Attendance	Record
72	April 1	@ Philadelphia	W 100–83	Dirk Nowitzki (29)	Erick Dampier (10)	Nowitzki, Finley (4)	Wachovia Center; 20,464	49–23
73	April 3	@ Cleveland	L 80–100	Dirk Nowitzki (21)	Erick Dampier (8)	three players tied (3)	Gund Arena; 20,562	49–24
74	April 5	Orlando	W 114–105	Dirk Nowitzki (21)	Dirk Nowitzki (9)	Jason Terry (13)	American Airlines Center; 19,969	50–24
75	April 7	San Antonio	W 104–68	Keith Van Horn (17)	Dirk Nowitzki (8)	Devin Harris (5)	American Airlines Center; 20,418	51–24
76	April 9	Utah	W 88–81	Dirk Nowitzki (24)	Dirk Nowitzki (9)	Dirk Nowitzki (5)	American Airlines Center; 20,387	52–24
77	April 11	Memphis	W 110–89	Josh Howard (23)	Erick Dampier (13)	Jason Terry (6)	American Airlines Center; 20,044	53–24
78	April 13	@ Seattle	W 95–90	Dirk Nowitzki (31)	Erick Dampier (9)	Jason Terry (8)	KeyArena; 16,502	54–24
79	April 14	@ Portland	W 102–90	Jerry Stackhouse (18)	three players tied (7)	Van Horn, Terry (3)	Rose Garden Arena; 17,074	55–24
80	April 17	@ L.A. Lakers	W 114–112	Dirk Nowitzki (24)	Dirk Nowitzki (8)	Jason Terry (10)	Staples Center; 18,237	56–24
81	April 19	Seattle	W 101–96	Dirk Nowitzki (21)	Erick Dampier (8)	Marquis Daniels (9)	American Airlines Center; 20,534	57–24
82	April 20	@ Memphis	W 108–88	Josh Howard (27)	Dirk Nowitzki (8)	Jason Terry (6)	FedExForum; 16,512	58–24

2004–05 schedule

== Playoffs ==
2005 playoff game log
First Round: 4–3 (home: 2–2; road: 2–1)

Game	Date	Team	Score	High points	High rebounds	High assists	Location Attendance	Series
1	April 23	Houston	L 86–98	Dirk Nowitzki (21)	Josh Howard (10)	Nowitzki, Terry (3)	American Airlines Center; 20,678	0–1
2	April 25	Houston	L 111–113	Dirk Nowitzki (26)	Erick Dampier (9)	Jason Terry (6)	American Airlines Center; 20,884	0–2
3	April 28	@ Houston	W 106–102	Dirk Nowitzki (28)	three players tied (6)	Daniels, Terry (4)	Toyota Center; 18,199	1–2
4	April 30	@ Houston	W 97–93	Jason Terry (32)	Dirk Nowitzki (7)	Dirk Nowitzki (6)	Toyota Center; 18,211	2–2
5	May 2	Houston	W 103–100	Dirk Nowitzki (23)	Dirk Nowitzki (13)	Jason Terry (7)	American Airlines Center; 20,894	3–2
6	May 5	@ Houston	L 83–101	Jerry Stackhouse (21)	Dirk Nowitzki (13)	Nowitzki, Terry (4)	Toyota Center; 18,215	3–3
7	May 7	Houston	W 116–76	Jason Terry (31)	Dirk Nowitzki (14)	Armstrong, Stackhouse (4)	American Airlines Center; 20,884	4–3

Conference Semifinals: 2–4 (home: 1–2; road: 1–2)

Game	Date	Team	Score	High points	High rebounds	High assists	Location Attendance	Series
1	May 9	@ Phoenix	L 102–127	Dirk Nowitzki (28)	Dirk Nowitzki (13)	Dirk Nowitzki (4)	America West Arena; 18,422	0–1
2	May 11	@ Phoenix	W 108–106	Michael Finley (31)	Dampier, Nowitzki (12)	Finley, Stackhouse (5)	America West Arena; 18,422	1–1
3	May 13	Phoenix	L 102–119	Dirk Nowitzki (21)	Dirk Nowitzki (13)	Jason Terry (7)	American Airlines Center; 20,896	1–2
4	May 15	Phoenix	W 119–109	Josh Howard (29)	Erick Dampier (11)	Jason Terry (8)	American Airlines Center; 20,894	2–2
5	May 18	@ Phoenix	L 108–114	Dirk Nowitzki (34)	Erick Dampier (14)	Jason Terry (8)	America West Arena; 18,422	2–3
6	May 20	Phoenix	L 126–130 (OT)	Jason Terry (36)	Josh Howard (14)	Dirk Nowitzki (6)	American Airlines Center; 20,915	2–4

2005 schedule

== Player statistics ==
=== Ragular season ===
Player	POS	GP	GS	MP	REB	AST	STL	BLK	PTS	MPG	RPG	APG	SPG	BPG	PPG
Jason Terry	PG	80	57	2,401	188	429	109	15	993	30.0	2.4	5.4	1.4	.2	12.4
Dirk Nowitzki	PF	78	78	3,020	757	240	97	119	2,032	38.7	9.7	3.1	1.2	1.5	26.1
Alan Henderson	PF	78	10	1,203	348	21	29	37	273	15.4	4.5	.3	.4	.5	3.5
Shawn Bradley	C	77	14	885	214	15	25	63	211	11.5	2.8	.2	.3	.8	2.7
Josh Howard	SF	76	76	2,446	484	109	116	49	958	32.2	6.4	1.4	1.5	.6	12.6
Devin Harris	PG	76	19	1,173	102	169	77	19	436	15.4	1.3	2.2	1.0	.3	5.7
Michael Finley	SG	64	64	2,358	262	169	48	18	1,003	36.8	4.1	2.6	.8	.3	15.7
Marquis Daniels	SG	60	17	1,412	216	128	83	14	545	23.5	3.6	2.1	1.4	.2	9.1
Erick Dampier	C	59	56	1,609	501	51	15	80	542	27.3	8.5	.9	.3	1.4	9.2
Jerry Stackhouse	SG	56	7	1,617	183	127	53	10	833	28.9	3.3	2.3	.9	.2	14.9
Darrell Armstrong^{†}	PG	52	7	576	67	113	30	6	122	11.1	1.3	2.2	.6	.1	2.3
Calvin Booth^{†}	C	34	1	262	58	4	11	16	82	7.7	1.7	.1	.3	.5	2.4
Keith Van Horn^{†}	PF	29	3	684	129	34	15	10	354	23.6	4.4	1.2	.5	.3	12.2
D. J. Mbenga	C	15	1	58	8	0	0	5	15	3.9	.5	.0	.0	.3	1.0
Pavel Podkolzin	C	5	0	10	2	0	0	0	1	2.0	.4	.0	.0	.0	.2
Dan Dickau^{†}	PG	4	0	16	1	1	0	0	5	4.0	.3	.3	.0	.0	1.3

- ^{†} Denotes player spent time with another team in the season. Stats reflect time with the Mavericks only.

=== Playoffs ===
Player	POS	GP	GS	MP	REB	AST	STL	BLK	PTS	MPG	RPG	APG	SPG	BPG	PPG
Dirk Nowitzki	PF	13	13	551	131	43	18	21	308	42.4	10.1	3.3	1.4	1.6	23.7
Jason Terry	PG	13	13	501	54	60	17	7	227	38.5	4.2	4.6	1.3	.5	17.5
Michael Finley	SG	13	13	491	56	28	17	0	170	37.8	4.3	2.2	1.3	.0	13.1
Josh Howard	SF	13	13	428	96	24	11	7	201	32.9	7.4	1.8	.8	.5	15.5
Erick Dampier	C	13	13	308	97	7	7	18	91	23.7	7.5	.5	.5	1.4	7.0
Jerry Stackhouse	SG	13	0	403	53	30	8	3	209	31.0	4.1	2.3	.6	.2	16.1
Marquis Daniels	SG	11	0	165	34	14	6	3	72	15.0	3.1	1.3	.5	.3	6.5
Alan Henderson	PF	9	0	92	17	0	2	2	18	10.2	1.9	.0	.2	.2	2.0
Devin Harris	PG	9	0	80	11	11	4	1	22	8.9	1.2	1.2	.4	.1	2.4
Darrell Armstrong	PG	9	0	66	4	9	3	2	18	7.3	.4	1.0	.3	.2	2.0
Shawn Bradley	C	7	0	27	6	0	0	2	9	3.9	.9	.0	.0	.3	1.3
Keith Van Horn	PF	3	0	33	6	1	1	0	22	11.0	2.0	.3	.3	.0	7.3

== Awards and records ==
- Dirk Nowitzki, All-NBA First Team
- Dirk Nowitzki, NBA All-Star Game
