= Calvin Booth =

American basketball player (born 1976)

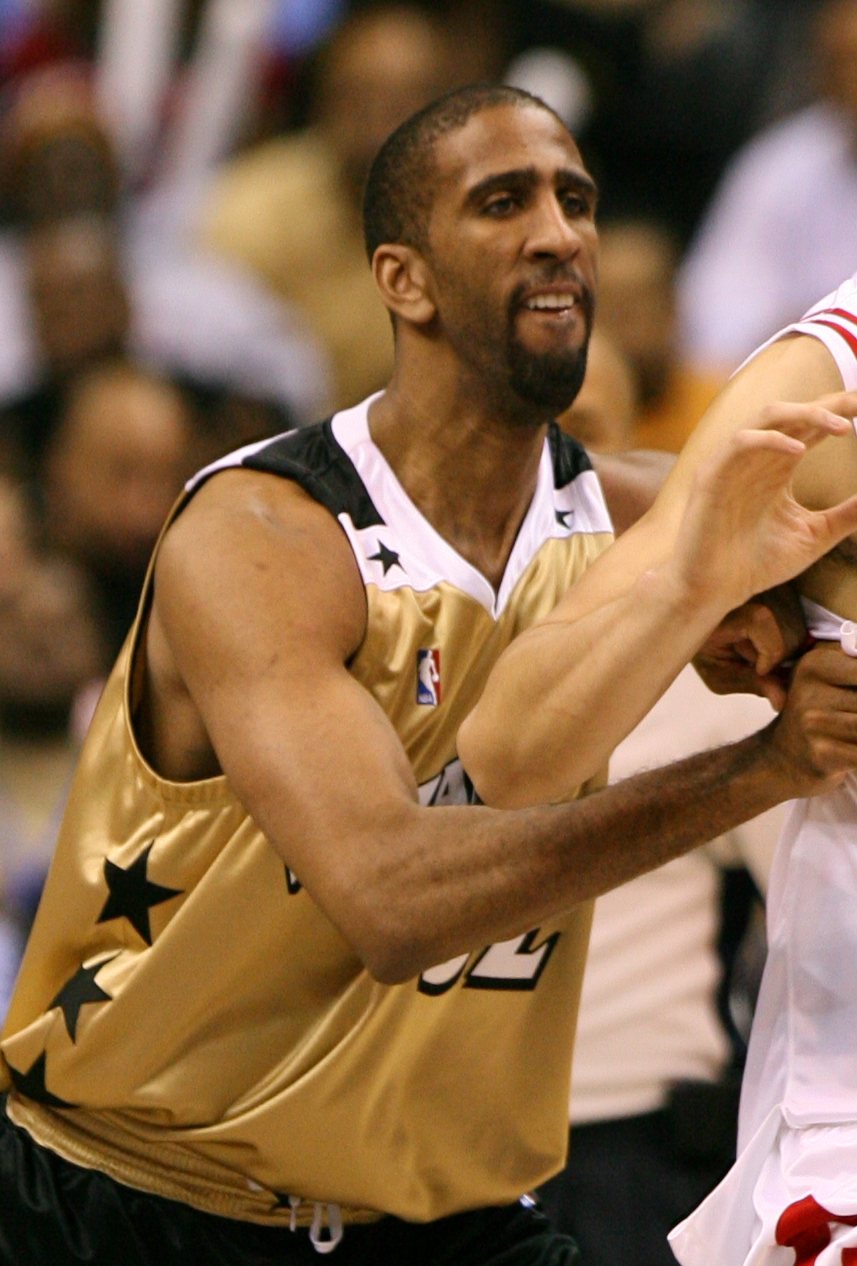
- Booth with the Washington Wizards in 2006

Personal information
- Born: May 7, 1976 (age 50) Reynoldsburg, Ohio, U.S.
- Listed height: 6 ft 11 in (2.11 m)
- Listed weight: 230 lb (104 kg)

Career information
- High school: Groveport Madison (Groveport, Ohio)
- College: Penn State (1995–1999)
- NBA draft: 1999: 2nd round, 35th overall pick
- Drafted by: Washington Wizards
- Playing career: 1999–2009
- Position: Center
- Number: 52

Career history
- 1999–2001: Washington Wizards
- 2001: Dallas Mavericks
- 2001–2004: Seattle SuperSonics
- 2004–2005: Dallas Mavericks
- 2005: Milwaukee Bucks
- 2005–2007: Washington Wizards
- 2007–2008: Philadelphia 76ers
- 2008–2009: Minnesota Timberwolves
- 2009: Sacramento Kings

Career highlights
- As executive: NBA champion (2023)
- Stats at NBA.com
- Stats at Basketball Reference
Medals
Men's basketball
Representing United States
Goodwill Games
Gold medal – first place	1998 New York	National team
Gold medal – first place	2001 Brisbane	National team

Calvin Lawrence Booth (born May 7, 1976) is a former National Basketball Association (NBA) basketball player and team executive who most recently served as the general manager of the Denver Nuggets. He played 10 seasons for various NBA teams as a center after playing college basketball for the Penn State Nittany Lions. After his playing career concluded, he served in front office positions for the New Orleans Pelicans, Minnesota Timberwolves, and Denver Nuggets, eventually being named general manager of the Nuggets in 2020, a position he held until 2025.

== College career ==
Booth attended Penn State University after starring at Groveport Madison High School in Ohio. As a junior, he was named the Big Ten Defensive Player of the Year. As a senior, he was a second-team All-Big Ten Conference pick. He earned his Bachelor of Arts at Penn State in 1998.

== NBA playing career ==
Booth was drafted by the Washington Wizards in the second round (35th overall) of the 1999 NBA draft. He played for the Wizards from 1999 until 2001, when he was traded to the Dallas Mavericks alongside Juwan Howard and Obinna Ekezie in exchange for Loy Vaught, Etan Thomas, Courtney Alexander, Christian Laettner, and Hubert Davis. In Game 5 of the 2001 NBA playoffs against the Utah Jazz, Booth made a layup with 9.8 seconds remaining to give Dallas a game-ending 84–83 lead and therefore a 3–2 series victory; this was the Mavericks' first playoff series win since the 1988 Western Conference semifinals against Denver.

In 2001, Booth signed with the Seattle SuperSonics and spent three seasons with them. On January 13, 2004, as a member of the SuperSonics, Booth recorded a career-high 10 blocks in 17 minutes of playing time. He accompanied this with 2 points, 0 rebounds, 0 assists, and 0 steals. The Supersonics lost this game to the Cavaliers, 96–104. In 2004, Booth was traded back to the Dallas Mavericks for Danny Fortson. In 2005, at the trade deadline, Booth was traded to the Milwaukee Bucks with Alan Henderson for Keith Van Horn. During the 2006–07 NBA season, he played for the Washington Wizards a second time, providing play from off the bench and starting occasionally.

On September 10, 2007, Booth signed as a free agent with the Philadelphia 76ers. In 2008, Booth, Rodney Carney and a 2010 first round draft pick were traded to the Minnesota Timberwolves for a conditional 2010 second round draft pick that ultimately never conveyed due to being top-55 protected. In 2009, Booth and Rashad McCants were traded to the Sacramento Kings for Bobby Brown and Shelden Williams. Booth was cut by the Kings in 2010, effectively ending his career.

Throughout his career, Booth averaged 3.3 points, 2.8 rebounds, and 1.0 blocks per game.

== Front office career ==
Booth started his front office career with the Pelicans as a scout during the 2012–13 season. After one year there, he moved to the Timberwolves, working his way up to director of player personnel. On August 16, 2017, Booth was named assistant general manager of the Nuggets. On July 7, 2020, Booth was named general manager of the Nuggets. He won his first championship in 2023, when the Nuggets defeated the Miami Heat in five games. On April 8, 2025, the Nuggets fired Booth along with head coach Michael Malone.

== NBA career statistics ==
Legend
GP	Games played	GS	Games started	MPG	Minutes per game
FG%	Field goal percentage	3P%	3-point field goal percentage	FT%	Free throw percentage
RPG	Rebounds per game	APG	Assists per game	SPG	Steals per game
BPG	Blocks per game	PPG	Points per game	**Bold**	Career high

=== Regular season ===
Year	Team	GP	GS	MPG	FG%	3P%	FT%	RPG	APG	SPG	BPG	PPG
1999–00	Washington	11	0	13.0	.348	—	.714	2.9	.6	.3	1.3	3.8
2000–01	Washington	40	22	16.0	.440	—	.733	4.4	.6	.4	**2.0**	4.5
2000–01	Dallas	15	7	**19.5**	**.548**	—	.606	**4.8**	**1.3**	**.8**	**2.0**	**7.5**
2001–02	Seattle	15	15	18.6	.427	—	**.958**	3.6	1.1	.4	.9	6.2
2002–03	Seattle	47	0	12.2	.437	.000	.723	2.3	.3	.2	.7	2.9
2003–04	Seattle	**71**	**35**	17.0	.466	.000	.798	3.9	.4	.2	1.4	4.9
2004–05	Dallas	34	1	7.7	.430	.000	.875	1.7	.1	.3	.5	2.4
2004–05	Milwaukee	17	0	11.1	.517	—	.750	2.9	.2	.2	.7	2.5
2005–06	Washington	33	2	7.6	.426	**.500**	.556	1.6	.4	.3	.3	1.4
2006–07	Washington	44	1	8.6	.470	**.500**	.600	1.8	.4	.1	.7	1.6
2007–08	Philadelphia	31	0	6.6	.333	—	.600	1.2	.3	.2	.6	.8
2008–09	Minnesota	1	0	1.0	—	—	—	1.0	.0	.0	.0	.0
2008–09	Sacramento	7	0	7.9	.500	—	.750	1.4	.0	.1	.3	2.3
Career		366	83	12.2	.451	.222	.748	2.8	.4	.3	1.0	3.3

=== Playoffs ===
Year	Team	GP	GS	MPG	FG%	3P%	FT%	RPG	APG	SPG	BPG	PPG
2001	Dallas	**10**	0	13.7	.405	—	**.889**	2.8	.2	.7	**.6**	3.8
2007	Washington	1	0	**18.0**	**.667**	—	—	**4.0**	**1.0**	**1.0**	.0	**4.0**
Career		11	0	14.1	.425	—	.889	2.9	.3	.7	.5	3.8

== See also ==
- List of NCAA Division I men's basketball career blocks leaders
- List of National Basketball Association players with 10 or more blocks in a game
