= Antonio Daniels =

American basketball player (born 1975)

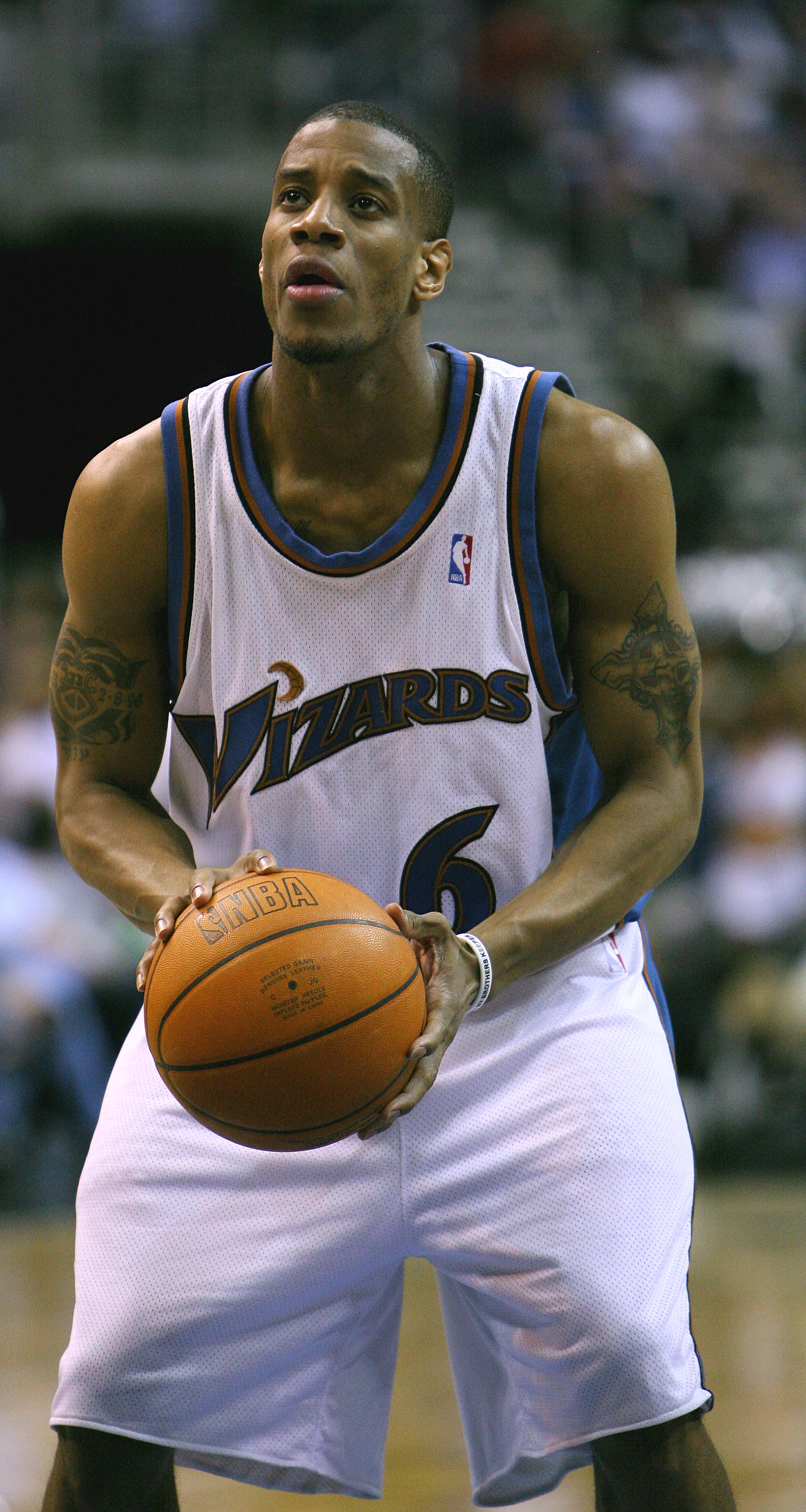
- Daniels with the Washington Wizards in 2007

Personal information
- Born: March 19, 1975 (age 51) Columbus, Ohio, U.S.
- Listed height: 6 ft 4 in (1.93 m)
- Listed weight: 205 lb (93 kg)

Career information
- High school: St. Francis DeSales (Columbus, Ohio)
- College: Bowling Green (1993–1997)
- NBA draft: 1997: 1st round, 4th overall pick
- Drafted by: Vancouver Grizzlies
- Playing career: 1997–2011
- Position: Point guard / shooting guard
- Number: 33, 10, 6, 50, 22

Career history
- 1997–1998: Vancouver Grizzlies
- 1998–2002: San Antonio Spurs
- 2002–2003: Portland Trail Blazers
- 2003–2005: Seattle SuperSonics
- 2005–2008: Washington Wizards
- 2008–2009: New Orleans Hornets
- 2010–2011: Texas Legends
- 2011: Philadelphia 76ers
- 2012: Texas Legends

Career highlights
- NBA champion (1999); All-NBA D-League Third Team (2011); MAC Player of the Year (1997); First-team All-MAC (1997)

Career statistics
- Points: 6,623 (7.6 ppg)
- Assists: 2,934 (3.4 apg)
- Steals: 564 (0.6 spg)
- Stats at NBA.com
- Stats at Basketball Reference

Antonio Robert Daniels (born March 19, 1975) is an American former professional basketball player who played 13 seasons in the National Basketball Association (NBA). He is currently the television color analyst for the New Orleans Pelicans on the Gulf Coast Sports & Entertainment Network and co-host/analyst on SiriusXM NBA Radio.

== College career ==
He played college basketball at Bowling Green State University from 1994 to 1997. In 1994, he was named MAC freshman of the Year. In 1997, he was named MAC Player of the Year helping the Falcons to the MAC regular-season championship. He finished his career second on the Bowling Green career scoring chart with 1,789 points, ranking 10th in MAC history at the time.

== Professional career ==
After playing college basketball at Bowling Green, Daniels was selected by the Vancouver Grizzlies with the fourth overall pick of the 1997 NBA draft. On June 24, 1998, Vancouver gave up on Daniels by drafting Mike Bibby with the 2nd overall pick and he was traded to the San Antonio Spurs in exchange for rookie Felipe López and Carl Herrera. He helped the Spurs win an NBA championship in 1999. On August 5, 2002, Daniels along with Spurs teammates Charles Smith and Amal McCaskill was traded to the Portland Trail Blazers in exchange for Erick Barkley, Steve Kerr, and a conditional second-round pick in the 2003 NBA draft. He later signed as a free agent with the Seattle SuperSonics. After his run with the Sonics had come to an end, he signed with the Washington Wizards.

He was sent to the New Orleans Hornets in a three-team trade with the Washington Wizards and the Memphis Grizzlies on December 10, 2008.

On September 9, 2009, he was traded to the Minnesota Timberwolves along with a 2014 second-round pick in exchange for Bobby Brown and Darius Songaila. On September 24, 2009, Daniels agreed to a contract buyout.

On November 1, 2010, Daniels was selected by the Texas Legends of the NBA Development League in the second round (pick 13) of the 2010 NBA Development League draft.

On April 5, 2011, Daniels was signed to a 10-day contract by the Philadelphia 76ers. He returned to Texas Legends for the next season. and then retired.

== Post-playing career ==
On October 22, 2015, Daniels was named as an analyst for Fox Sports Oklahoma covering the Oklahoma City Thunder games.

On June 27, 2019, Daniels was named the television color analyst for Fox Sports New Orleans covering the New Orleans Pelicans alongside Joel Meyers.

== NBA career statistics ==
Legend
GP	Games played	GS	Games started	MPG	Minutes per game
FG%	Field goal percentage	3P%	3-point field goal percentage	FT%	Free throw percentage
RPG	Rebounds per game	APG	Assists per game	SPG	Steals per game
BPG	Blocks per game	PPG	Points per game	**Bold**	Career high
†	Won an NBA championship

=== Regular season ===
Year	Team	GP	GS	MPG	FG%	3P%	FT%	RPG	APG	SPG	BPG	PPG
1997–98	Vancouver	74	50	26.4	.416	.212	.659	1.9	4.5	.7	.1	7.8
1998–99†	San Antonio	47	0	13.1	.454	.294	.754	1.1	2.3	.6	.1	4.7
1999–00	San Antonio	68	1	17.6	**.474**	.333	.713	1.3	2.6	.8	.1	6.2
2000–01	San Antonio	79	23	26.1	.468	.404	.776	2.1	3.8	.8	**.2**	9.4
2001–02	San Antonio	**82**	13	26.5	.440	.291	.752	2.1	2.8	.6	.1	9.2
2002–03	Portland	67	2	13.0	.452	.305	.855	1.1	1.3	.5	.1	3.7
2003–04	Seattle	71	32	21.3	.470	.362	.842	2.0	4.2	.6	.1	8.0
2004–05	Seattle	75	2	27.0	.438	.297	.816	2.3	4.1	.7	.0	**11.2**
2005–06	Washington	80	17	28.5	.418	.228	.845	2.2	3.6	.7	.1	9.6
2006–07	Washington	80	8	22.0	.442	.302	.832	1.9	3.6	.5	.1	7.1
2007–08	Washington	71	**63**	**30.4**	.459	.230	.776	**2.9**	**4.8**	**1.0**	.0	8.4
2008–09	Washington	13	5	22.2	.400	**.455**	.758	1.7	3.6	.5	.0	5.1
2008–09	New Orleans	61	4	12.0	.424	.347	.821	.9	2.1	.3	.0	3.8
2010–11	Philadelphia	4	0	8.8	.400	.000	**1.000**	1.3	.5	.0	.0	1.5
Career		872	220	22.6	.444	.311	.793	1.8	3.4	.6	.1	7.6

=== Playoffs ===
Year	Team	GP	GS	MPG	FG%	3P%	FT%	RPG	APG	SPG	BPG	PPG
1999†	San Antonio	**15**	0	7.1	.429	**.667**	.833	.7	1.1	.3	.0	1.8
2000	San Antonio	4	0	20.5	.391	.250	.692	2.5	1.5	**1.8**	.0	7.3
2001	San Antonio	13	**8**	31.2	.481	.370	**.943**	2.0	2.9	.5	.1	13.5
2002	San Antonio	10	0	22.4	.455	.375	.864	2.7	1.5	.7	**.3**	9.5
2003	Portland	6	1	16.3	.474	.600	.500	1.3	2.0	.2	.2	3.7
2005	Seattle	11	3	30.1	.468	.286	.857	2.8	4.5	1.0	.0	**13.8**
2006	Washington	6	0	36.0	**.538**	.273	.909	2.8	3.3	.5	.2	13.2
2007	Washington	4	4	**44.0**	.447	.200	.857	**4.5**	**11.8**	1.3	**.3**	13.3
2008	Washington	6	4	25.7	.452	.250	.882	2.3	3.0	.3	**.3**	7.3
2009	New Orleans	5	0	12.8	.154	.250	.818	.6	1.8	.4	.2	2.8
Career		80	20	23.2	.461	.353	.863	2.1	2.9	.6	.1	8.6
