= 2004–05 New Orleans Hornets season =

- Head coach: Byron Scott
- General manager: Allan Bristow
- Owner: George Shinn
- Arena: New Orleans Arena

Results
- Record: 18–64 (.220)
- Place: Division: 5th (Southwest); Conference: 15th (Western)
- Playoff finish: Did not qualify
- Stats at Basketball Reference

Local media
- Television: Cox Sports Television
- Radio: WTIX

The 2004–05 New Orleans Hornets season was the franchise's third (Note: At the time, this season was considered the 17th season in franchise history, being viewed as a relocation from Charlotte. In 2014, after this team was rebranded as the Pelicans, the name and the statistical history of the original team was reclaimed by the present day Charlotte Hornets, who had begun play in 2004 as an expansion team known as the Charlotte Bobcats.) season in the National Basketball Association. The Hornets moved from the Eastern Conference's Central Division to the tougher Southwest Division of the Western Conference for the season. Under new head coach Byron Scott, the Hornets played and suffered their worst basketball ways losing their first eight games, which led to a 2–29 start. Many players were traded away during the season. The team traded David Wesley to the Houston Rockets in December, then midway through the season dealt Baron Davis to the Golden State Warriors, and sent Jamal Mashburn, who was lost for the entire season with a knee injury, to the Philadelphia 76ers for Glenn Robinson, who never played for the Hornets and was released to free agency and signed with the San Antonio Spurs. Mashburn would never suit up for the 76ers.

The Hornets were eliminated from playoff contention for the first time in franchise history, by losing their final nine games and finished in last place in the Southwest Division with an 18–64 record, which was also the same record as the newly rechristened Charlotte Bobcats. (Note: Since 2014, the Pelicans retained the franchise's records and history from the 2002–03 season onward, while its prior history from 1988 to 2002 is currently inherited by the Charlotte Bobcats/Hornets franchise.)

For the season, they added new yellow road alternate uniform they remained in use until 2008.

== Offseason ==
On June 16, the Hornets claimed Brazilian swingman Alex Garcia on waivers from the San Antonio Spurs. On June 22, the 2004 NBA expansion draft took place, and the Hornets lost guard Maurice Carter to the Charlotte Bobcats. Two days later, the NBA draft took place.

=== Draft picks ===
| Round | Pick | Player | Position | Nationality | College |
|---|---|---|---|---|---|
| 1 | 18 | J.R. Smith | SG | United States | |
| 2 | 44 | Tim Pickett | SF | United States | Florida State |

In the draft, the Hornets drafted J. R. Smith and Tim Pickett. Smith would play only two seasons with the Hornets, and Pickett would not play in the NBA. On July 19, the Hornets signed Chris Andersen. Andersen would be with the Hornets for four seasons, missing the 2006–07 season due to a suspension for substance abuse. On August 3, the Hornets signed former Sixth Man of the Year Rodney Rogers. Rogers would be traded to the Philadelphia 76ers, along with Jamal Mashburn, on February 24 for Glenn Robinson. On September 29, the Hornets signed Tremaine Fowlkes and Britton Johnsen. The following day, the team signed Lorinza "Junior" Harrington and Lee Nailon. On October 28, the Hornets waived Fowlkes, and three days later, they waived Johnsen.

== Roster ==
2004–05 New Orleans Hornets roster
Players

| Pos. | No. | Player | Height | Weight | DOB | From |
|---|---|---|---|---|---|---|
| C | 12 | Chris Andersen | 6 ft 10 in (2.08 m) | 245 lb (111 kg) | 1978-07-07 | Blinn |
| PF | 42 | P. J. Brown | 6 ft 11 in (2.11 m) | 239 lb (108 kg) | 1969-10-14 | Louisiana Tech |
| PG | 5 | Speedy Claxton | 5 ft 11 in (1.80 m) | 166 lb (75 kg) | 1978-05-08 | Hofstra |
| PG | 2 | Dan Dickau | 6 ft 0 in (1.83 m) | 190 lb (86 kg) | 1978-09-16 | Gonzaga |
| SG | 32 | Casey Jacobsen | 6 ft 6 in (1.98 m) | 215 lb (98 kg) | 1981-03-19 | Stanford |
| C | 15 | Maciej Lampe | 6 ft 11 in (2.11 m) | 275 lb (125 kg) | 1985-02-05 | Poland |
| SF | 9 | George Lynch | 6 ft 8 in (2.03 m) | 218 lb (99 kg) | 1970-09-03 | North Carolina |
| C | 21 | Jamaal Magloire | 6 ft 11 in (2.11 m) | 265 lb (120 kg) | 1978-05-21 | Kentucky |
| PF | 10 | Boštjan Nachbar | 6 ft 9 in (2.06 m) | 221 lb (100 kg) | 1980-07-03 | Slovenia |
| SF | 33 | Lee Nailon | 6 ft 9 in (2.06 m) | 238 lb (108 kg) | 1975-02-22 | TCU |
| SG | 23 | J. R. Smith | 6 ft 6 in (1.98 m) | 225 lb (102 kg) | 1985-09-09 | St. Benedict's Prep (HS) |
| C | 4 | Jackson Vroman | 6 ft 10 in (2.08 m) | 220 lb (100 kg) | 1981-06-06 | Iowa State |
| SF | 30 | David West | 6 ft 9 in (2.06 m) | 250 lb (113 kg) | 1980-08-29 | Xavier |

Coaches
Head coach
- Byron Scott
Assistant(s)
- Jim Cleamons
- Kenny Gattison
- Darrell Walker
- Terry Kofler (trainer)
- Scott Cochran (assistant strength coach)

Legend
- (DP) Unsigned draft pick
- (FA) Free agent
- (S) Suspended
- Injured

Roster
Updated: March 1, 2005

== Regular season ==
=== Standings ===
| Southwest Division | W | L | PCT | GB | Home | Road | Div |
|---|---|---|---|---|---|---|---|
| y-San Antonio Spurs | 59 | 23 | .720 | – | 38–3 | 21–20 | 10–6 |
| x-Dallas Mavericks | 58 | 24 | .707 | 1 | 29–12 | 29–12 | 11–5 |
| x-Houston Rockets | 51 | 31 | .622 | 8 | 26–15 | 25–16 | 10–6 |
| x-Memphis Grizzlies | 45 | 37 | .549 | 14 | 26–15 | 19–22 | 7–9 |
| e-New Orleans Hornets | 18 | 64 | .220 | 41 | 11–30 | 7–34 | 2–14 |

| # | Western Conference | | | | |
| # | Team | W | L | PCT | GB |
|---|---|---|---|---|---|
| 1 | z-Phoenix Suns | 62 | 20 | .756 | — |
| 2 | y-San Antonio Spurs | 59 | 23 | .720 | 3 |
| 3 | y-Seattle SuperSonics | 52 | 30 | .634 | 10 |
| 4 | x-Dallas Mavericks | 58 | 24 | .707 | 4 |
| 5 | x-Houston Rockets | 51 | 31 | .622 | 11 |
| 6 | x-Sacramento Kings | 50 | 32 | .610 | 12 |
| 7 | x-Denver Nuggets | 49 | 33 | .598 | 13 |
| 8 | x-Memphis Grizzlies | 45 | 37 | .549 | 17 |
| 9 | e-Minnesota Timberwolves | 44 | 38 | .537 | 18 |
| 10 | e-Los Angeles Clippers | 37 | 45 | .451 | 25 |
| 11 | e-Los Angeles Lakers | 34 | 48 | .415 | 28 |
| 12 | e-Golden State Warriors | 34 | 48 | .415 | 28 |
| 13 | e-Portland Trail Blazers | 27 | 55 | .329 | 35 |
| 14 | e-Utah Jazz | 26 | 56 | .317 | 36 |
| 15 | e-New Orleans Hornets | 18 | 64 | .220 | 44 |

== Player statistics ==
Legend
| GP | Games played | GS | Games started | MPG | Minutes per game |
| FG% | Field-goal percentage | 3P% | 3-point field-goal percentage | FT% | Free-throw percentage |
| RPG | Rebounds per game | APG | Assists per game | SPG | Steals per game |
| BPG | Blocks per game | PPG | Points per game |

| Player | GP | GS | MPG | FG% | 3FG% | FT% | RPG | APG | SPG | BPG | PPG |
|---|---|---|---|---|---|---|---|---|---|---|---|
| Chris Andersen | | | | | | | | | | | |
| Darrell Armstrong | | | | | | | | | | | |
| Lonny Baxter | | | | | | | | | | | |
| P.J. Brown | | | | | | | | | | | |
| Speedy Claxton | | | | | | | | | | | |
| Baron Davis | | | | | | | | | | | |
| Dan Dickau | | | | | | | | | | | |
| Corsley Edwards | | | | | | | | | | | |
| Matt Freije | | | | | | | | | | | |
| Alex Garcia | | | | | | | | | | | |
| Junior Harrington | | | | | | | | | | | |
| Casey Jacobsen | | | | | | | | | | | |
| Maciej Lampe | | | | | | | | | | | |
| George Lynch | | | | | | | | | | | |
| Jamaal Magloire | | | | | | | | | | | |
| Boštjan Nachbar | | | | | | | | | | | |
| Lee Nailon | | | | | | | | | | | |
| Rodney Rogers | | | | | | | | | | | |
| J.R. Smith | | | | | | | | | | | |
| Jackson Vroman | | | | | | | | | | | |
| David Wesley | | | | | | | | | | | |
| David West | | | | | | | | | | | |

== Transactions ==
=== Trades ===
| December 3, 2004 | To New Orleans Hornets Dan Dickau; 2005 2nd round draft pick To Dallas Mavericks Darrell Armstrong |

| December 27, 2004 | To New Orleans Hornets Jim Jackson; Boštjan Nachbar To Houston Rockets David Wesley |

| January 21, 2005 | To New Orleans Hornets Casey Jacobsen; Maciej Lampe; Jackson Vroman To Phoenix Suns Jim Jackson; 2005 2nd round draft pick |

| February 24, 2005 | To New Orleans Hornets Glenn Robinson To Philadelphia 76ers Jamal Mashburn; Rodney Rogers | To New Orleans Hornets Speedy Claxton; Dale Davis To Golden State Warriors Baron Davis |

=== Free agents ===
Additions
| Player | Date signed | Former team |
|---|---|---|
| Chris Andersen | July 19 | Denver Nuggets |
| Rodney Rogers | August 3 | New Jersey Nets |
| Tremaine Fowlkes | September 29 | Detroit Pistons |
| Britton Johnsen | September 29 | Orlando Magic |
| Junior Harrington | September 30 | Azovmash Mariupol (Ukraine) |
| Lee Nailon | September 30 | Cleveland Cavaliers |
| Matt Freije | November 19 | Miami Heat |
| Corsley Edwards | December 4 | Sioux Falls Skyforce (CBA) |
| Lonny Baxter | December 12 | Yakima Sun Kings (CBA) |
| Corsley Edwards | January 5 | New Orleans Hornets |
| Junior Harrington | January 29 | New Orleans Hornets |

Subtractions
| Player | Date waived | New Team |
|---|---|---|
| Tremaine Fowlkes | October 28 | Indiana Pacers |
| Britton Johnsen | October 31 | Indiana Pacers |
| Lonny Baxter | December 27 | Panathinaikos B.C. (Greece) |
| Alex Garcia | December 27 | COC Ribeirão Preto (Brazil) |
| Corsley Edwards | January 3 | New Orleans Hornets |
| Matt Freije | January 21 | Nashville Rhythm (ABA) |
| Junior Harrington | January 21 | New Orleans Hornets |
| Glenn Robinson | March 1 | San Antonio Spurs |
| Dale Davis | March 1 | Indiana Pacers |
