= 2004–05 San Antonio Spurs season =

- NBA champions
- Conference champions
- Division champions
- Head coach: Gregg Popovich
- President: Gregg Popovich
- General manager: R. C. Buford
- Owner: Peter Holt
- Arena: SBC Center

Results
- Record: 59–23 (.720)
- Place: Division: 1st (Southwest); Conference: 2nd (Western)
- Playoff finish: NBA champions (Defeated Pistons 4–3)
- Stats at Basketball Reference

Local media
- Television: FSN Southwest, KENS, KRRT
- Radio: KLEY

The 2004–05 San Antonio Spurs season was the Spurs' 29th season in the National Basketball Association, the 32nd in San Antonio, and 38th season as a franchise. During the offseason, the Spurs signed free agent Brent Barry. The Spurs got off to a solid start, winning 16 of their first 20 games, entering the New Year with a 25–6 record. In February 2005, the Spurs traded longtime Spur Malik Rose and two draft choices to the New York Knicks for Jamison Brewer and center Nazr Mohammed. Late in the season, the team signed free agent forward Glenn Robinson. The Spurs finished first place in the Southwest Division, and second in the Western Conference with a 59–23 record. Tim Duncan and Manu Ginobili were both voted to play in the 2005 NBA All-Star Game, which was hosted in Denver. This was Ginobili's first All-Star appearance.

In the first round of the playoffs, the Spurs lost Game 1 at home to the Denver Nuggets 93–87, but would beat them in five games. In the semifinals, they defeated the Seattle SuperSonics in six games, then upset the top-seeded Phoenix Suns, which featured regular season MVP Steve Nash, Amar'e Stoudemire and Shawn Marion in five games in the Western Conference Finals. In the Finals, the Spurs would win their third NBA championship, defeating the 2004 NBA champions, the Detroit Pistons, in a seven-game series. Following the season, Glenn Robinson retired.

== Draft picks ==
Round	Pick	Player	Position	Nationality	College
1	28	Beno Udrih	G	Slovenia	
2	52	Romain Sato	G/F	Central African Republic	Xavier
2	57	Sergei Karaulov	C	Russia	

== Roster ==
2004–05 San Antonio Spurs roster
Players

Pos.	No.	Player	Height	Weight	DOB	From
SG	17	Brent Barry	6 ft 6 in (1.98 m)	185 lb (84 kg)	1971-12-31	Oregon State
SF	12	Bruce Bowen	6 ft 7 in (2.01 m)	200 lb (91 kg)	1971-06-14	Cal State Fullerton
SG	23	Devin Brown	6 ft 5 in (1.96 m)	210 lb (95 kg)	1978-12-30	Texas–San Antonio
F/C	21	Tim Duncan	6 ft 11 in (2.11 m)	255 lb (116 kg)	1976-04-25	Wake Forest
SG	20	Manu Ginóbili	6 ft 6 in (1.98 m)	200 lb (91 kg)	1977-07-28	Argentina
PF	5	Robert Horry	6 ft 10 in (2.08 m)	240 lb (109 kg)	1970-08-25	Alabama
SF	43	Linton Johnson	6 ft 8 in (2.03 m)	205 lb (93 kg)	1980-06-13	Tulane
PF	4	Sean Marks	6 ft 10 in (2.08 m)	250 lb (113 kg)	1975-08-23	California
PF	34	Tony Massenburg	6 ft 9 in (2.06 m)	220 lb (100 kg)	1967-07-31	Maryland
C	2	Nazr Mohammed	6 ft 10 in (2.08 m)	221 lb (100 kg)	1977-09-05	Kentucky
C	8	Rasho Nesterović	7 ft 0 in (2.13 m)	255 lb (116 kg)	1976-05-30	Slovenia
PG	9	Tony Parker	6 ft 2 in (1.88 m)	185 lb (84 kg)	1982-05-17	France
SF	3	Glenn Robinson	6 ft 7 in (2.01 m)	225 lb (102 kg)	1973-01-10	Purdue
PG	14	Beno Udrih	6 ft 3 in (1.91 m)	205 lb (93 kg)	1982-07-05	Slovenia
PG	11	Mike Wilks	5 ft 10 in (1.78 m)	185 lb (84 kg)	1979-05-07	Rice

Coaches
Head coach
- Gregg Popovich
Assistant(s)
- Brett Brown
- Mike Budenholzer
- P. J. Carlesimo
- Don Newman
- Joe Prunty
- Will Sevening (trainer)

Legend
- (DP) Unsigned draft pick
- (FA) Free agent
- (S) Suspended
- Injured

Roster
Updated: April 4, 2005

== Regular season ==
=== Overview ===
After their disappointing second round collapse to the Los Angeles Lakers, the Spurs looked to regain the NBA crown. They would get off to a quick start, posting a 12–3 record in November. The Spurs would stay hot through December as they established a 25–6 record entering the New Year. The Spurs would be near the top in the Western Conference all season battling the Phoenix Suns for the best record in the NBA. Just as it appeared the Spurs would cruise toward the playoffs, their season suddenly hit a bump in the road when Tim Duncan went down in a March 20 loss to the Detroit Pistons with a sprained ankle. The rest of the way, the Spurs would limp home winning 9 of their last 17 as they held on to the Southwest Division by just 1 game with a 59–23 record. The Spurs leading scorer during the season was Tim Duncan with 20.3 PPG.

=== Standings ===
Southwest Division	W	L	PCT	GB	Home	Road	Div
y-San Antonio Spurs	59	23	.720	–	38–3	21–20	10–6
x-Dallas Mavericks	58	24	.707	1	29–12	29–12	11–5
x-Houston Rockets	51	31	.622	8	26–15	25–16	10–6
x-Memphis Grizzlies	45	37	.549	14	26–15	19–22	7–9
e-New Orleans Hornets	18	64	.220	41	11–30	7–34	2–14

#	Western Conference				
#	Team	W	L	PCT	GB
1	z-Phoenix Suns	62	20	.756	—
2	y-San Antonio Spurs	59	23	.720	3
3	y-Seattle SuperSonics	52	30	.634	10
4	x-Dallas Mavericks	58	24	.707	4
5	x-Houston Rockets	51	31	.622	11
6	x-Sacramento Kings	50	32	.610	12
7	x-Denver Nuggets	49	33	.598	13
8	x-Memphis Grizzlies	45	37	.549	17
9	e-Minnesota Timberwolves	44	38	.537	18
10	e-Los Angeles Clippers	37	45	.451	25
11	e-Los Angeles Lakers	34	48	.415	28
12	e-Golden State Warriors	34	48	.415	28
13	e-Portland Trail Blazers	27	55	.329	35
14	e-Utah Jazz	26	56	.317	36
15	e-New Orleans Hornets	18	64	.220	44

=== Game log ===
2004–05 game log
Total: 59–23 (home: 38–3; road: 21–20)
November: 12–3 (home: 6–0; road: 6–3)

Game	Date	Team	Score	High points	High rebounds	High assists	Location Attendance	Record
1	November 3	Sacramento	W 101–85	Tim Duncan (30)	Tim Duncan (14)	Tony Parker (4)	SBC Center; 18,797	1–0
2	November 5	@ L.A. Lakers	W 105–96	Tim Duncan (26)	Tim Duncan (16)	Parker, Ginóbili (6)	Staples Center; 18,997	2–0
3	November 7	@ Seattle	L 94–113	Parker, Ginóbili (21)	Tim Duncan (10)	Tony Parker (6)	KeyArena; 15,851	2–1
4	November 10	Golden State	W 91–71	Tim Duncan (23)	Tim Duncan (18)	Tony Parker (4)	SBC Center; 16,826	3–1
5	November 12	Miami	W 93–84	Manu Ginóbili (29)	Tim Duncan (13)	Manu Ginóbili (7)	SBC Center; 18,797	4–1
6	November 13	@ Atlanta	W 103–88	Tim Duncan (26)	Tim Duncan (18)	Manu Ginóbili (9)	Philips Arena; 11,326	5–1
7	November 16	New York	W 99–81	Tony Parker (18)	Tim Duncan (10)	Tony Parker (9)	SBC Center; 17,705	6–1
8	November 18	@ Philadelphia	W 88–80	Tim Duncan (34)	Tim Duncan (13)	Manu Ginóbili (9)	Wachovia Center; 16,446	7–1
9	November 19	@ Boston	W 92–84	Tim Duncan (26)	Tim Duncan (6)	Brent Barry (6)	FleetCenter; 15,586	8–1
10	November 21	@ Toronto	L 91–96	Tim Duncan (26)	Tim Duncan (15)	Tony Parker (6)	Air Canada Centre; 17,264	8–2
11	November 22	@ Memphis	L 90–93	Tim Duncan (26)	Tim Duncan (9)	Ginóbili, Barry (4)	FedExForum; 16,127	8–3
12	November 24	Dallas	W 94–80	Tim Duncan (27)	Tim Duncan (13)	Tony Parker (9)	SBC Center; 18,797	9–3
13	November 26	@ Denver	W 89–75	Tim Duncan (23)	Tim Duncan (13)	Parker, Ginóbili (5)	Pepsi Center; 19,099	10–3
14	November 27	Utah	W 109–76	Malik Rose (16)	Tim Duncan (13)	Parker, Barry (4)	SBC Center; 17,543	11–3
15	November 30	@ Dallas	W 107–89	Tim Duncan (20)	Tim Duncan (13)	three players tied (4)	American Airlines Center; 19,455	12–3

December : 13–3 (home: 8–1; road: 5–2)

Game	Date	Team	Score	High points	High rebounds	High assists	Location Attendance	Record
16	December 1	Philadelphia	W 105–72	Duncan, Brown (24)	Tim Duncan (12)	Tony Parker (5)	SBC Center; 17,566	13–3
17	December 3	Detroit	W 80–77	Tony Parker (20)	Tim Duncan (18)	Manu Ginóbili (4)	SBC Center; 18,797	14–3
18	December 4	@ Milwaukee	W 104–83	Tim Duncan (20)	Duncan, Nesterović (7)	Tony Parker (8)	Bradley Center; 17,812	15–3
19	December 6	@ Chicago	W 91–75	Tony Parker (17)	Tim Duncan (10)	Parker, Ginóbili (5)	United Center; 16,353	16–3
20	December 8	Seattle	L 96–102	Tim Duncan (39)	Tim Duncan (10)	Tony Parker (4)	SBC Center; 18,797	16–4
21	December 9	@ Houston	L 80–81	Tim Duncan (26)	Tim Duncan (18)	Tony Parker (9)	Toyota Center; 16,170	16–5
22	December 11	Cleveland	W 116–97	Tim Duncan (34)	Tim Duncan (7)	Tony Parker (13)	SBC Center; 18,797	17–5
23	December 15	Orlando	W 94–91	Tim Duncan (24)	Tim Duncan (14)	Beno Udrih (7)	SBC Center; 17,384	18–5
24	December 17	@ New Orleans	W 83–67	Tim Duncan (19)	Tim Duncan (12)	three players tied (5)	New Orleans Arena; 13,071	19–5
25	December 18	Golden State	W 104–85	Ginóbili, Parker (21)	three players tied (7)	Tony Parker (9)	SBC Center; 17,467	20–5
26	December 22	@ Orlando	L 87–93	Tim Duncan (24)	Rasho Nesterović (11)	Tony Parker (5)	TD Waterhouse Centre; 16,325	20–6
27	December 23	Minnesota	W 96–82	Manu Ginóbili (22)	Tim Duncan (10)	Parker, Bowen (8)	SBC Center; 18,797	21–6
28	December 26	Boston	W 107–90	Tony Parker (27)	Tim Duncan (11)	Tony Parker (6)	SBC Center; 17,541	22–6
29	December 28	Phoenix	W 115–94	Tony Parker (29)	Tim Duncan (12)	three players tied (6)	SBC Center; 18,797	23–6
30	December 30	@ Portland	W 114–80	Tim Duncan (19)	Tim Duncan (9)	Beno Udrih (10)	Rose Garden Arena; 18,677	24–6
31	December 31	@ L.A. Clippers	W 98–79	Tim Duncan (23)	Tim Duncan (8)	Tony Parker (11)	Staples Center; 17,115	25–6

January : 12–4 (home: 9–0; road: 3–4)

Game	Date	Team	Score	High points	High rebounds	High assists	Location Attendance	Record
32	January 2	@ Sacramento	L 81–86	Manu Ginóbili (18)	Rasho Nesterović (12)	Duncan, Ginóbili (4)	ARCO Arena; 17,317	25–7
33	January 4	L.A. Lakers	W 100–83	Bruce Bowen (24)	Tim Duncan (15)	Tony Parker (10)	SBC Center; 18,797	26–7
34	January 6	Indiana	W 111–98	Tim Duncan (27)	Tim Duncan (12)	Tony Parker (6)	SBC Center; 17,549	27–7
35	January 8	Denver	W 99–90	Manu Ginóbili (22)	Rasho Nesterović (11)	Tony Parker (8)	SBC Center; 18,797	28–7
36	January 10	@ Utah	L 96–97	Tim Duncan (24)	Tim Duncan (13)	Tony Parker (5)	Delta Center; 18,325	28–8
37	January 12	Milwaukee	W 94–79	Tim Duncan (21)	Tim Duncan (9)	Tony Parker (8)	SBC Center; 16,754	29–8
38	January 14	Dallas	W 98–95	Tim Duncan (25)	Rasho Nesterović (12)	Tony Parker (9)	SBC Center; 17,897	30–8
39	January 15	@ Houston	L 67–73	Tony Parker (21)	Tim Duncan (12)	Tony Parker (6)	Toyota Center; 18,290	30–9
40	January 17	Washington	W 101–73	Devin Brown (24)	Rasho Nesterović (12)	Tony Parker (8)	SBC Center; 17,232	31–9
41	January 19	L.A. Clippers	W 80–79	Tony Parker (25)	Tim Duncan (14)	Tony Parker (7)	SBC Center; 17,603	32–9
42	January 21	@ Phoenix	W 128–123 (OT)	Manu Ginóbili (48)	Tim Duncan (19)	Manu Ginóbili (6)	America West Arena; 18,422	33–9
43	January 23	@ Sacramento	W 103–73	Tim Duncan (23)	Tim Duncan (13)	Tony Parker (8)	ARCO Arena; 17,317	34–9
44	January 24	@ Portland	L 99–107	Tim Duncan (24)	Tim Duncan (11)	Tony Parker (7)	Rose Garden Arena; 15,575	34–10
45	January 27	Sacramento	W 90–80	Manu Ginóbili (25)	Tim Duncan (12)	Tony Parker (7)	SBC Center; 18,797	35–10
46	January 29	New Orleans	W 93–83	Tony Parker (23)	Tim Duncan (14)	Tony Parker (10)	SBC Center; 18,797	36–10
47	January 31	@ Seattle	W 103–84	Manu Ginóbili (23)	Duncan, Parker (10)	Manu Ginóbili (7)	KeyArena; 17,072	37–10

February : 6–3 (home: 1–1; road: 5–2)

Game	Date	Team	Score	High points	High rebounds	High assists	Location Attendance	Record
48	February 3	@ L.A. Lakers	W 103–91	Tony Parker (22)	Malik Rose (11)	Parker, Ginóbili (9)	Staples Center; 18,997	38–10
49	February 8	@ Charlotte	W 104–85	Tony Parker (20)	Malik Rose (10)	Tony Parker (6)	Charlotte Coliseum; 12,985	39–10
50	February 9	@ Washington	L 87–95	Tony Parker (22)	Parker, Nesterović (8)	Tony Parker (9)	MCI Center; 20,173	39–11
51	February 11	@ New Jersey	W 101–91	Tony Parker (27)	Tim Duncan (15)	Tim Duncan (9)	Continental Airlines Arena; 17,121	40–11
52	February 13	@ Miami	L 92–96	Manu Ginóbili (24)	Rasho Nesterović (11)	Devin Brown (4)	American Airlines Arena; 20,258	40–12
53	February 16	@ New Orleans	W 101–78	Tim Duncan (19)	Malik Rose (15)	Manu Ginóbili (10)	New Orleans Arena; 13,105	41–12
All-Star Break
54	February 23	Houston	W 99–81	Tim Duncan (30)	Tim Duncan (11)	Tony Parker (6)	SBC Center; 18,797	42–12
55	February 26	Memphis	L 82–84	Tim Duncan (27)	Tim Duncan (19)	Tony Parker (5)	SBC Center; 18,797	42–13
56	February 28	@ Cleveland	W 94–92	Tim Duncan (20)	Tim Duncan (11)	Tony Parker (10)	Gund Arena; 18,216	43–13

March : 10–5 (home: 10–1; road: 0–4)

Game	Date	Team	Score	High points	High rebounds	High assists	Location Attendance	Record
57	March 2	Toronto	W 92–86	Manu Ginóbili (17)	Tim Duncan (11)	Tony Parker (7)	SBC Center; 17,795	44–13
58	March 4	Chicago	W 102–99	Tim Duncan (31)	Tim Duncan (13)	Tony Parker (8)	SBC Center; 18,797	45–13
59	March 6	Utah	W 101–94	Manu Ginóbili (31)	Manu Ginóbili (8)	Manu Ginóbili (7)	SBC Center; 18,797	46–13
60	March 8	New Jersey	W 90–74	Devin Brown (22)	Devin Brown (9)	Tony Parker (6)	SBC Center; 17,588	47–13
61	March 9	@ Phoenix	L 101–107	Tony Parker (30)	three players tied (6)	Tony Parker (5)	America West Arena; 18,422	47–14
62	March 12	Denver	L 87–90	Tony Parker (25)	Nazr Mohammed (9)	Brent Barry (6)	SBC Center; 18,797	47–15
63	March 14	New Orleans	W 112–89	Beno Udrih (25)	Tim Duncan (13)	Brent Barry (7)	SBC Center; 18,797	48–15
64	March 16	Minnesota	W 89–73	Tim Duncan (25)	Tim Duncan (14)	three players tied (6)	SBC Center; 18,797	49–15
65	March 18	Charlotte	W 93–76	Tony Parker (24)	Robert Horry (9)	Beno Udrih (6)	SBC Center; 17,798	50–15
66	March 20	@ Detroit	L 101–110	Devin Brown (18)	Nazr Mohammed (8)	Tony Parker (5)	The Palace of Auburn Hills; 22,076	50–16
67	March 21	@ New York	L 75–88	Devin Brown (22)	Rasho Nesterović (11)	Tony Parker (6)	Madison Square Garden; 19,763	50–17
68	March 23	@ Indiana	L 93–100	Brent Barry (17)	Bruce Bowen (7)	Tony Parker (7)	Conseco Fieldhouse; 16,560	50–18
69	March 25	Atlanta	W 111–95	Ginóbili, Barry (23)	Manu Ginóbili (8)	Parker, Ginóbili (6)	SBC Center; 18,797	51–18
70	March 27	Houston	W 83–70	Manu Ginóbili (18)	Tony Parker (8)	Tony Parker (6)	SBC Center; 18,797	52–18
71	March 30	Seattle	W 89–76	Tony Parker (28)	Rasho Nesterović (9)	Tony Parker (5)	SBC Center; 18,797	53–18

April : 6–5 (home: 4–0; road: 2–5)

Game	Date	Team	Score	High points	High rebounds	High assists	Location Attendance	Record
72	April 1	@ Denver	L 84–102	Tony Parker (17)	Horry, Ginóbili (9)	Tony Parker (7)	Pepsi Center; 19,730	53–19
73	April 2	L.A. Lakers	W 95–94	Brent Barry (20)	three players tied (8)	Tony Parker (9)	SBC Center; 18,797	54–19
74	April 6	L.A. Clippers	W 91–82	Manu Ginóbili (16)	Sean Marks (10)	Beno Udrih (5)	SBC Center; 18,797	55–19
75	April 7	@ Dallas	L 68–104	Brent Barry (12)	Rasho Nesterović (6)	Mike Wilks (3)	American Airlines Center; 20,418	55–20
76	April 9	@ L.A. Clippers	W 125–124 (2OT)	Manu Ginóbili (40)	Tony Massenburg (9)	Parker, Ginóbili (9)	Staples Center; 19,748	56–20
77	April 10	@ Golden State	W 136–134 (2OT)	Tony Parker (35)	Nazr Mohammed (15)	Tony Parker (12)	Oakland Arena; 16,324	57–20
78	April 12	Portland	W 95–89	Manu Ginóbili (30)	Nazr Mohammed (14)	Tony Parker (5)	SBC Center; 18,797	58–20
79	April 13	@ Utah	L 91–93	Manu Ginóbili (21)	Nazr Mohammed (10)	Tony Parker (5)	Delta Center; 17,014	58–21
80	April 16	Memphis	W 97–75	Bruce Bowen (15)	Mohammed, Duncan (8)	Tony Parker (10)	SBC Center; 18,797	59–21
81	April 18	@ Memphis	L 92–94	Glenn Robinson (23)	Nazr Mohammed (15)	Manu Ginóbili (8)	FedExForum; 17,183	59–22
82	April 20	@ Minnesota	L 73–95	Glenn Robinson (16)	Nazr Mohammed (8)	three players tied (3)	Target Center; 18,122	59–23

2004–05 schedule

== Player statistics ==
=== Regular season ===
Player	POS	GP	GS	MP	REB	AST	STL	BLK	PTS	MPG	RPG	APG	SPG	BPG	PPG
Bruce Bowen	SF	82	82	2,627	285	126	55	39	675	32.0	3.5	1.5	.7	.5	8.2
Brent Barry	SG	81	8	1,742	190	178	39	20	601	21.5	2.3	2.2	.5	.2	7.4
Tony Parker	PG	80	80	2,735	298	491	98	4	1,331	34.2	3.7	6.1	1.2	.1	16.6
Beno Udrih	PG	80	2	1,149	83	150	41	10	471	14.4	1.0	1.9	.5	.1	5.9
Robert Horry	PF	75	16	1,396	268	80	67	60	451	18.6	3.6	1.1	.9	.8	6.0
Manu Ginóbili	SG	74	74	2,193	329	288	119	27	1,186	29.6	4.4	3.9	1.6	.4	16.0
Rasho Nesterović	C	70	70	1,785	459	71	31	117	410	25.5	6.6	1.0	.4	1.7	5.9
Devin Brown	SG	67	0	1,238	176	92	39	12	494	18.5	2.6	1.4	.6	.2	7.4
Tim Duncan	PF	66	66	2,203	732	179	45	174	1,342	33.4	11.1	2.7	.7	2.6	20.3
Tony Massenburg	PF	61	6	699	163	14	18	20	196	11.5	2.7	.2	.3	.3	3.2
Malik Rose^{†}	PF	50	1	862	227	41	31	9	317	17.2	4.5	.8	.6	.2	6.3
Mike Wilks	PG	48	0	278	25	33	14	1	81	5.8	.5	.7	.3	.0	1.7
Nazr Mohammed^{†}	C	23	5	414	147	8	5	33	142	18.0	6.4	.3	.2	1.4	6.2
Sean Marks	PF	23	0	244	56	8	3	11	76	10.6	2.4	.3	.1	.5	3.3
Glenn Robinson	SF	9	0	157	24	8	4	3	90	17.4	2.7	.9	.4	.3	10.0
Dion Glover	SG	7	0	68	11	4	3	3	25	9.7	1.6	.6	.4	.4	3.6
Linton Johnson	SF	2	0	15	3	0	1	0	0	7.5	1.5	.0	.5	.0	.0

- ^{†} Denotes player spent time with another team in the season. Stats reflect time with the Spurs only.

=== Playoffs ===
Player	POS	GP	GS	MP	REB	AST	STL	BLK	PTS	MPG	RPG	APG	SPG	BPG	PPG
Tim Duncan	PF	23	23	869	286	63	8	52	542	37.8	12.4	2.7	.3	2.3	23.6
Tony Parker	PG	23	23	858	66	100	17	2	396	37.3	2.9	4.3	.7	.1	17.2
Bruce Bowen	SF	23	23	814	66	36	11	13	132	35.4	2.9	1.6	.5	.6	5.7
Nazr Mohammed	C	23	23	528	154	8	14	23	163	23.0	6.7	.3	.6	1.0	7.1
Manu Ginóbili	SG	23	15	772	133	97	28	6	479	33.6	5.8	4.2	1.2	.3	20.8
Brent Barry	SG	23	8	555	56	44	15	4	141	24.1	2.4	1.9	.7	.2	6.1
Robert Horry	PF	23	0	618	125	47	21	20	214	26.9	5.4	2.0	.9	.9	9.3
Beno Udrih	PG	21	0	241	17	22	9	1	78	11.5	.8	1.0	.4	.0	3.7
Rasho Nesterović	C	15	0	114	26	2	1	5	10	7.6	1.7	.1	.1	.3	.7
Glenn Robinson	SF	13	0	113	21	1	3	7	50	8.7	1.6	.1	.2	.5	3.8
Devin Brown	SG	12	0	60	7	3	1	0	21	5.0	.6	.3	.1	.0	1.8
Tony Massenburg	PF	9	0	28	11	0	0	0	3	3.1	1.2	.0	.0	.0	.3

== Playoffs ==
2005 playoff game log
First Round: 4–1 (home: 2–1; road: 2–0)

Game	Date	Team	Score	High points	High rebounds	High assists	Location Attendance	Series
1	April 24	Denver	L 87–93	Manu Ginóbili (23)	Nazr Mohammed (15)	Tony Parker (6)	SBC Center; 18,797	0–1
2	April 27	Denver	W 104–76	Tim Duncan (24)	Duncan, Horry (9)	Tony Parker (6)	SBC Center; 18,797	1–1
3	April 30	@ Denver	W 86–78	Manu Ginóbili (32)	Tim Duncan (11)	Brent Barry (4)	Pepsi Center; 19,913	2–1
4	May 2	@ Denver	W 126–115 (OT)	Tim Duncan (39)	Tim Duncan (8)	Tony Parker (7)	Pepsi Center; 19,776	3–1
5	May 4	Denver	W 99–89	Tony Parker (21)	Nazr Mohammed (13)	Tony Parker (7)	SBC Center; 18,797	4–1

Conference Semifinals: 4–2 (home: 3–0; road: 1–2)

Game	Date	Team	Score	High points	High rebounds	High assists	Location Attendance	Series
1	May 8	Seattle	W 103–81	Tony Parker (29)	Tim Duncan (9)	Tim Duncan (5)	SBC Center; 18,797	1–0
2	May 10	Seattle	W 108–91	Manu Ginóbili (28)	Nazr Mohammed (10)	Tony Parker (7)	SBC Center; 18,797	2–0
3	May 12	@ Seattle	L 91–92	Tim Duncan (23)	Tim Duncan (11)	Tony Parker (8)	KeyArena; 17,072	2–1
4	May 15	@ Seattle	L 89–101	Tim Duncan (35)	Tim Duncan (10)	Bowen, Parker (3)	KeyArena; 17,072	2–2
5	May 17	Seattle	W 103–90	Manu Ginóbili (39)	Tim Duncan (14)	Manu Ginóbili (6)	SBC Center; 18,797	3–2
6	May 19	@ Seattle	W 98–96	Tim Duncan (26)	Tim Duncan (9)	Manu Ginóbili (7)	KeyArena; 17,072	4–2

Conference Finals: 4–1 (home: 1–1; road: 3–0)

Game	Date	Team	Score	High points	High rebounds	High assists	Location Attendance	Series
1	May 22	@ Phoenix	W 121–114	Tony Parker (29)	Tim Duncan (15)	Manu Ginóbili (5)	America West Arena; 18,422	1–0
2	May 24	@ Phoenix	W 111–108	Tim Duncan (30)	Duncan, Mohammed (8)	Tony Parker (5)	America West Arena; 18,422	2–0
3	May 28	Phoenix	W 102–92	Tim Duncan (33)	Tim Duncan (15)	Tony Parker (7)	SBC Center; 18,797	3–0
4	May 30	Phoenix	L 106–111	Manu Ginóbili (28)	Tim Duncan (16)	Manu Ginóbili (7)	SBC Center; 18,797	3–1
5	June 1	@ Phoenix	W 101–95	Tim Duncan (31)	Tim Duncan (15)	Manu Ginóbili (6)	America West Arena; 18,422	4–1

NBA Finals: 4–3 (home: 3–1; road: 1–2)

Game	Date	Team	Score	High points	High rebounds	High assists	Location Attendance	Series
1	June 9	Detroit	W 84–69	Manu Ginóbili (26)	Tim Duncan (17)	Horry, Parker (3)	SBC Center; 18,797	1–0
2	June 12	Detroit	W 97–76	Manu Ginóbili (27)	Tim Duncan (11)	Manu Ginóbili (7)	SBC Center; 18,797	2–0
3	June 14	@ Detroit	L 79–96	Tony Parker (21)	Tim Duncan (10)	Bowen, Parker (4)	The Palace of Auburn Hills; 22,076	2–1
4	June 16	@ Detroit	L 71–102	Tim Duncan (16)	Tim Duncan (16)	Bowen, Parker (4)	The Palace of Auburn Hills; 22,076	2–2
5	June 19	@ Detroit	W 96–95 (OT)	Tim Duncan (26)	Tim Duncan (19)	Manu Ginóbili (9)	The Palace of Auburn Hills; 22,076	3–2
6	June 21	Detroit	L 86–95	Duncan, Ginóbili (21)	Tim Duncan (15)	Tony Parker (5)	SBC Center; 18,797	3–3
7	June 23	Detroit	W 81–74	Tim Duncan (25)	Tim Duncan (11)	Manu Ginóbili (4)	SBC Center; 18,797	4–3

2005 schedule

== NBA Finals ==
=== Game One ===
ABC

June 9, 2005
8:00 p.m. EST

Recap

Detroit Pistons 69, San Antonio Spurs 84
Pts: Billups 25; Hamilton 14; Prince 11; Rebs: B. Wallace 8; R. Wallace 7; McDyess 7 Asts: Billups 6; Prince 4 Blocks: R. Wallace 6	Pts: Ginobili 26; Duncan 24; Parker 15; Rebs: Duncan 17; Ginobili 9; Mohammed 7 Asts: Parker 3; Horry 3; Bowen 2
San Antonio leads series, 1–0

SBC Center San Antonio
Attendance: 18,797
Referees: Mike Callahan; Ron Garretson; Steve Javie

Manu Ginóbili was widely considered the star of the night, scoring in a virtuoso performance near the end of the game to lead the Spurs to victory. The Pistons were then left 'in the dust', the NBA website reported. Ginobili scored 15 of his 26 points in the fourth quarter to complement a huge game by Tim Duncan.

Ginobili, a famous Argentine All-Star, already with championship rings from the NBA and Euroleague and an Olympic gold medal (the only player in history with all three), got to work on his second NBA title by taking over in the final period. He scored eight points in a decisive 12-2 surge that gave the Spurs a 67–55 lead, then throttled a push by the Pistons with a swooping dunk, 3-pointer and running hook for an 81–67 advantage with less than two minutes to go.

Having been idle for a week, the Spurs looked weak. With their defense, however, they were able to overcome adversity. Tim Duncan, who had 24 points and 17 rebounds, also contributed. Although the Pistons tend to suddenly come alive in the fourth quarter, the converse was true this game as San Antonio put together a big quarter to take a commanding lead in the game.

Team	1	2	3	4	Tot.
Detroit	20	17	14	18	69
San Antonio	17	18	20	29	84

=== Game Two ===
ABC

June 12, 2005
8:00 p.m. EST

Recap

Detroit Pistons 76, San Antonio Spurs 97
Pts: McDyess 15; Hamilton 14; Billups 13; Rebs: B. Wallace 8; R. Wallace 8; Hamilton 7 Asts: R. Wallace 4; Three others at 3	Pts: Ginobili 27; Duncan 18; Bowen 12; Rebs: Duncan 11; Horry 6; Mohammed 5 Asts: Ginobili- 7; Horry 5; Barry 5 Blocks: Duncan 4
San Antonio leads series, 2–0

SBC Center San Antonio
Attendance: 18,797
Referees: Dan Crawford, Bernie Fryer, Jack Nies

Coming into the game, it seemed as if the resilient Pistons, who survived two elimination games against Miami in the Eastern Finals, would come out strong and give the Spurs a challenge. However, it was the Spurs who came out with a sense of urgency, as they did not want the Pistons to steal a game in San Antonio and take home court advantage away from them. From the opening tip, Game 2 was all San Antonio as the Spurs got out to a quick lead and never looked back.

The Spurs took advantage of Detroit's uncharacteristic mistakes throughout the night, which included missing 9 shots from inside four feet from the basket. While the Pistons went cold from behind the arc, not scoring a single 3-point basket, the Spurs made 11 3-pointers, including 4 each by Manu Ginóbili and Bruce Bowen, who did not score a point in game 1. Ginobili finished the game with a game-high 27 points, while Tim Duncan finished with 18 points and 11 rebounds. Antonio McDyess was the high scorer for Detroit, scoring 15 points off the bench.

The 2–0 lead proved a daunting challenge to Detroit, historically. In the history of the NBA, in the 153 times when a team with home court advantage was up 2–0 in a series, only seven times has the other team rebounded to win the series.

Team	1	2	3	4	Tot.
Detroit	19	23	21	13	76
San Antonio	30	28	21	18	97

=== Game Three ===
ABC

June 14, 2005
9:00 p.m.

Recap

San Antonio Spurs 79, Detroit Pistons 96
Pts: Parker 21; Duncan 14; Bowen 13; Rebs: Duncan 10; Mohammed 7; Horry 5 Asts: Parker 4; Duncan 4; three others at 2	Pts: Hamilton 24; Billups 20; B. Wallace 15; Rebs: B. Wallace 11; McDyess 9 R. Wallace 7 Asts: Billups 7; Prince 5 Blocks: B. Wallace 5
San Antonio leads series, 2–1

The Palace of Auburn Hills Auburn Hills, Michigan
Attendance: 22,076
Referees: Joe Crawford, Bob Delaney, Bennett Salvatore

Going into this game, the Pistons were looking to rebound from the deficit.

In the past, only two teams in NBA history had ever won a Finals series after facing a 2–0 deficit — the Boston Celtics in the 1969 NBA Finals and the Portland Trail Blazers in the 1977 NBA Finals — however, the Miami Heat would later accomplish this feat against the Dallas Mavericks in the 2006 NBA Finals.

Despite the tough challenge, the Pistons pulled through, and came out with several key steals and two scoring runs in the third quarter, then netted many insurance points in the fourth to win a big game which was a de facto must-win. Ben Wallace was lauded and commended by many for stepping up to the challenge.

When the end of the game came, and the 96–79 final score flashed upon the screens, many Pistons fans, celebrating in jubilation, started filling the air with confetti and conducted other celebratory customs. That was the first time that the Spurs have given up more than 90 points in a Finals game.

Team	1	2	3	4	Tot.
San Antonio	27	15	23	14	79
Detroit	21	20	29	26	96

=== Game Four ===
Thursday, June 16, 2005, 21:00, at The Palace.

ABC

June 16, 2005
9:00 p.m.

Recap

San Antonio Spurs 71, Detroit Pistons 102
Pts: Duncan 16; Parker 12; Ginobili 12; Rebs: Duncan 16; Mohammed 5; three others at 4 Asts: Parker 4; Bowen 4; Ginobili 3	Pts: Billups 17; Hunter 17; R. Wallace -14; Rebs: B. Wallace 13; Hamilton 9; R. Wallace 8 Asts: Billups 7; McDyess 5 Note: 7 Pistons players in double point figures
Series tied, 2–2

The Palace of Auburn Hills Auburn Hills, Michigan
Attendance: 22,076
Referees: Dick Bavetta, Joe DeRosa, Eddie F. Rush

In this game also, as was previously observed in Game 3, the Pistons dominated the Spurs. Reporters began to remark about the tendency in this series for the home team to produce a blowout. Thus far, no game had been decided by less than 15 points.

Seven Pistons scored in double figures, and big games were collected from Rasheed Wallace, Chauncey Billups, Ben Wallace, and all the other élite stars of the franchise.

The outcome was never really in doubt, and the Pistons committed a Finals-record low four turnovers, but even this is often deemed an underestimation of the Pistons' defensive power. The deciding factor appears to have been the lack of possession time for the Spurs. This led to infrequent opportunities to score, and combined with an uncharacteristic scoring slump, the Spurs were only able to manage 71 points. For the second straight game, the Pistons scored more than 90 points against the Spurs.

Team	1	2	3	4	Tot.
San Antonio	17	19	21	14	71
Detroit	23	28	23	28	102

=== Game Five ===
ABC

June 19, 2005
9:00 p.m.

Recap

San Antonio Spurs 96, Detroit Pistons 95 (OT)
Pts: Duncan 26; Horry 21; Ginobili 15; Rebs: Duncan 19; Horry 7; Ginobili 6 Asts: Ginobili 9; Parker 3; Bowen 3;	Pts: Billups 34; Hamilton 15; B. Wallace 13; Rebs: B. Wallace 12; Prince 9; McDyess 6 Asts: Billups 7; Prince 3
San Antonio leads series, 3–2

The Palace of Auburn Hills Auburn Hills, Michigan
Attendance: 22,076
Referees: Mike Callahan, Ron Garretson, Steve Javie

After the first four games of the 2005 Finals being blowouts by the home team, Game 5 was the closest game of the series, and drew more national attention with the Spur's 1 point victory. It went down as one of the more memorable games in Finals history, giving the Spurs a 1 game lead in the series.

The game was closely contested by the two teams throughout the night as the lead changed 12 separate times, and the game was tied on 18 occasions. Regulation was not enough to settle this game, so the game went into overtime. The Pistons streaked out to a quick lead in the first few minutes of overtime, and seemed to have the game in hand. However, a missed opportunity with Detroit up 2 with 9 seconds to go opened the door for San Antonio. On the Spurs' next possession, Robert Horry inbounded the ball to Ginobili, who then gave it back to Horry, who was left wide open, to sink the game winning basket. Horry had previously already been famous for nailing the winning shot in Game 4 of the 2002 Western Conference Finals between the Lakers and Kings.

Horry went 5 for 6 from beyond the arc, including the game-winner, and scored 21 points coming off the bench, after not scoring until the final play of the 3rd quarter. He carried the team in the latter stages of the game as his teammates struggled with nerves that came with the weight of a must-win game on the road against an accomplished adversary. In addition to the game winning three pointer Horry made a spectacular left-handed dunk as the shot clock was winding in one possession, that is one of the highlights of the series. Incidentally, Horry happened to have the most NBA championships of any active player five, and looked to extend that to six.

Tim Duncan, despite struggling from the free-throw line, finished with 26 points and 19 rebounds for the Spurs. Chauncey Billups was the high scorer for the Pistons, finishing with a game high 34 points in the losing effort.

Team	1	2	3	4	OT	Tot.
San Antonio	21	21	22	25	7	96
Detroit	23	19	21	26	6	95

=== Game Six ===
ABC

June 21, 2005
8:00 p.m. EST

Recap

Detroit Pistons 95, San Antonio Spurs 86
Pts: Hamilton 23; Billups 21; R. Wallace 16; Rebs: B. Wallace 9; Prince 7; Billups 6 Asts: Billups 6; Prince 4	Pts: Ginobili 21; Duncan 21; Parker 15; Rebs: Duncan 15; Ginobili 10; Mohammed 8 Asts: Parker 5; Ginobili 3
Series tied, 3–3

SBC Center San Antonio
Attendance: 18,797
Referees: Dan Crawford, Bernie Fryer, Bennett Salvatore

Game 6 was a close game all along, and the lead kept fluctuating between the two teams. Again, the leading stars on both teams played big games. Detroit pulled away early in the fourth for an 80–73 lead with five minutes to go, but the Spurs continued to threaten them. Soon, it was back to a one-point game.

Then, Rasheed Wallace planted a three-pointer to pull away, and even with a resilient game by the Spurs, the Pistons had clinched the victory.

Nevertheless, several Pistons free throws were necessary in the final moments of the game to put a win out of reach for the Spurs.

Rasheed Wallace had a big game to atone for the mistake he made for leaving Horry open in Game 5. Despite the fact that his mistake ultimately cost the Pistons the championship, Wallace was nonchalant about the play, even commenting incorrectly that he left Horry to guard Duncan.

Billups and Prince again led the Pistons with steady, unwavering defense, which is the key, as it is often said, to victory. Although Duncan and Ginobili finished with 21 points each, neither was able to seriously threaten the strong Pistons defense enough to win the game. Detroit thus won its fifth consecutive game facing elimination. The Pistons became the first road team to force a Game 7 in the NBA Finals.

Team	1	2	3	4	Tot.
Detroit	23	23	25	24	95
San Antonio	23	24	20	19	86

=== Game Seven ===
ABC

June 23, 2005
8:00 p.m. EST

Recap

Detroit Pistons 74, San Antonio Spurs 81
Pts: Hamilton 15; Billups 13; B. Wallace 12; Rebs: B. Wallace 12; Hamilton 8; McDyess 7 Asts: Billups 8; McDyess 2	Pts: Duncan 25; Ginobili 23; Horry 15; Rebs: Duncan 11; Mohammed 7; Ginobili 5 Asts: Ginobili 4; Duncan 3
San Antonio wins series, 4–3

SBC Center San Antonio
Attendance: 18,797
Referees: Dick Bavetta, Joe Crawford, Eddie F. Rush

For the first time in eleven years, the NBA Finals came down to a decisive game. Momentum was on Detroit's side, but the Spurs had home-court advantage. The Pistons were looking to become the first team to ever win the last 2 games on the road, after being down 3–2. The stats were, as expected, heavily in favor of the Spurs. NBA teams are 74-17 all-time at home in Game 7, and 9-0 when leading 3-2 going home.

The game, like the previous two games of the series, was closely contested for the first three quarters. But the Spurs took control in the fourth quarter and never looked back as for the second time in three years, the Spurs celebrated a championship on the SBC Center floor. The Spurs won Game Seven 81–74, winning the franchise's third Larry O'Brien Trophy. For the game, Tim Duncan finished with a game high 25 points and 11 rebounds, while teammate Manu Ginóbili pitched in with 23 points. Richard Hamilton, with 15 points, was the high scorer for the Pistons, who fell just short of winning back to back championships.

Tim Duncan averaged 20.6 PPG on his way to his 3rd NBA Finals MVP award. Manu Ginóbili, Tony Parker, and Bruce Bowen each received their second championship ring, while Robert Horry became only the second player in NBA history (John Salley being the first) to play on championship teams for three different franchises.

Team	1	2	3	4	Tot.
Detroit	16	23	18	17	74
San Antonio	18	20	19	24	81

== Award winners ==
- Tim Duncan, NBA Finals Most Valuable Player Award
- Tim Duncan, All-NBA First Team
- Tim Duncan, NBA All-Defensive First Team
- Bruce Bowen, NBA All-Defensive First Team
- Sam Quinn, NBA Assistant Coach of the Year
