= Danny Fortson =

American basketball player (born 1976)

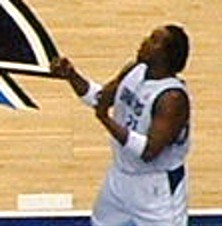

Personal information
- Born: March 27, 1976 (age 50) Philadelphia, Pennsylvania, U.S.
- Listed height: 6 ft 8 in (2.03 m)
- Listed weight: 260 lb (118 kg)

Career information
- High school: Shaler Area (Pittsburgh, Pennsylvania)
- College: Cincinnati (1994–1997)
- NBA draft: 1997: 1st round, 10th overall pick
- Drafted by: Milwaukee Bucks
- Playing career: 1997–2007
- Position: Power forward / center
- Number: 15, 21, 27

Career history
- 1997–1999: Denver Nuggets
- 1999–2000: Boston Celtics
- 2000–2003: Golden State Warriors
- 2003–2004: Dallas Mavericks
- 2004–2007: Seattle SuperSonics

Career highlights
- Consensus first-team All-American (1997); Consensus second-team All-American (1996); 2× Conference USA Player of the Year (1996, 1997); 2× First-team All-Conference USA (1996, 1997); First-team All-Great Midwest (1995); Third-team Parade All-American (1994); McDonald's All-American (1994)

Career NBA statistics
- Points: 3,615 (8.2 ppg)
- Rebounds: 3,184 (7.2 rpg)
- Assists: 301 (0.7 apg)
- Stats at NBA.com
- Stats at Basketball Reference

Daniel Anthony Fortson (born March 27, 1976) is an American former professional basketball player. He played the power forward and center positions in the National Basketball Association (NBA) from 1997 to 2007.

== Early life ==
Although born in Philadelphia, Fortson grew up in Altoona, Pennsylvania in a difficult home environment. He did not get along well with his father, who spent some time in jail, while his mother struggled with diabetes and depression. Fortson had grown up in the same neighborhood as Doug West and began pre school at the same school West attended, Altoona Area High School. Before starting there, he became friends with a family whose son played on his AAU basketball team. He spent two summers living with the family in the middle-class Pittsburgh suburb of Shaler Township, eighty five mile west of Altoona.

After his sophomore year, he and his mother moved to Shaler and Fortson transferred to Shaler Area High School for his final two years in high school (1992–1994). He was ruled ineligible his junior year for all but two games but averaged 30 points per game his senior year. He was a member of the prestigious Back board squad for pre-college basketball prospects.

== College career ==
Fortson played for the Cincinnati Bearcats for 3 years from 1994 to 1997. In 1997 opposing coach Charlie Spoonhour complimented Fortson with: "I could do a chin-up on his arm, and it wouldn't affect his shooting."

In his three years playing for the Bearcats he became the school's second highest all-time scorer by scoring 1,881 points.

A physical player with a soft shooting touch, he led UC to Conference USA championships in 1996 and 1997. He was a consensus first team All-American in 1997 when he averaged 21.3 points and 9.1 rebounds while shooting 62 percent from the field.

== NBA career ==
Fortson began his pro career after being drafted 10th overall by the Milwaukee Bucks. He was immediately traded the same day to the Denver Nuggets. In his first year, he averaged double-digit points and the next year averaged a double-double in both points and rebounds despite being undersized playing the center position. However, he had 16.7% of his own shots blocked that season, the highest ever in the NBA as of 2012–13. (Note: Comparison limited to players who attempted at least 500 field goals in a season since 1997, the earliest for which NBA.com has data.) Before the 1999–2000 season, he was once again traded to the Boston Celtics in a six-player deal. He missed the first 25 games of the season with a stress fracture in his right foot. He was traded to the Toronto Raptors on February 9, 2000, for Alvin Williams and Sean Marks, but the trade was rescinded two days later when Williams failed his physical.

Fortson did not play much with the Celtics and averaged 7.6 points and 6.7 rebounds per game. Following that season, he was traded to the Golden State Warriors in a four-team trade. He averaged 16.7 points and 16.3 rebounds per game for the Warriors in the first six games of the 2000–01 season, but those were the only games he would play due to another stress fracture injury in his right foot. He returned the following season, and had the best year of his career averaging 11.2 points and 11.7 rebounds in only 28.8 minutes as a starter for 76 games. In the 2002–03 season, Fortson mostly spent his time on the bench as most of his minutes went to Antawn Jamison and Troy Murphy. For the fourth time in his career, Fortson was again traded, this time in a nine-player deal to the Dallas Mavericks.

Fortson averaged only 11 minutes per game for the Mavericks, having to play behind forwards Dirk Nowitzki and Antoine Walker. Because of a need for a center who could make a jump shot, the Mavericks swapped Fortson for Calvin Booth with the Sonics in the offseason of 2004. Quickly, Fortson was back in the rotation and became a fan favorite in Seattle because of his physical play and rebounding prowess.

Fortson was a frequent target of foul calls by referees because of his physical play. As a result, Fortson registered the second-highest technical foul total among all active players during the 2004–05 season. During the 2005–06 season, Fortson's playing time diminished.

After returning from a two-game suspension on January 2, 2006, Fortson called NBA senior vice president of basketball operations Stu Jackson a "gangster" for the nearly $200,000 in fines Fortson was docked for his latest transgression with an official.

Fortson's rights were renounced by the Thunder on December 22, 2009, after not playing in the NBA since 2007.

Eighteen years after Fortson left UC, he was recognized as one of the greatest players in UC history when he was inducted into the Bearcats’ Hall of Fame on October 29, 2015. On May 21, 2016, Fortson was inducted in the Ohio Basketball Hall of Fame.

== NBA career statistics ==
Legend
GP	Games played	GS	Games started	MPG	Minutes per game
FG%	Field goal percentage	3P%	3-point field goal percentage	FT%	Free throw percentage
RPG	Rebounds per game	APG	Assists per game	SPG	Steals per game
BPG	Blocks per game	PPG	Points per game	**Bold**	Career high
*	Led the league

=== Regular season ===
Year	Team	GP	GS	MPG	FG%	3P%	FT%	RPG	APG	SPG	BPG	PPG
1997–98	Denver	**80**	23	22.6	.452	**.333**	.776	5.6	1.0	**.6**	**.4**	10.2
1998–99	Denver	50*	38	28.3	.495	.000	.727	11.6	.6	**.6**	**.4**	11.0
1999–00	Boston	55	5	15.6	.528	–	.735	6.7	.5	.4	.1	7.6
2000–01	Golden State	6	6	**33.8**	**.580**	–	.778	**16.3**	.8	.3	.0	**16.7**
2001–02	Golden State	77	**76**	28.8	.428	.250	.795	11.7	**1.6**	**.6**	.2	11.2
2002–03	Golden State	17	0	13.0	.370	.000	.655	4.3	.7	.5	.0	3.5
2003–04	Dallas	56	20	11.2	.511	–	.815	4.5	.2	.2	.2	3.9
2004–05	Seattle	62	0	16.9	.522	–	**.880**	5.6	.1	.2	.1	7.5
2005–06	Seattle	23	1	12.0	.529	–	.767	3.4	.1	.2	.1	3.8
2006–07	Seattle	14	6	11.3	.500	.000	.769	3.1	.1	.1	.0	2.9
Career		440	175	20.1	.472	.167	.785	7.2	.7	.4	.2	8.2

=== Playoffs ===
Year	Team	GP	GS	MPG	FG%	3P%	FT%	RPG	APG	SPG	BPG	PPG
2005	Seattle	11	0	9.7	.571	–	.800	2.4	.0	.3	.1	3.3
Career		11	0	9.7	.571	–	.800	2.4	.0	.3	.1	3.3
