= NCAA Final Four 2004 =

2003 video game

- Cover featuring Nick Collison
- Developer: Killer Game
- Publisher: Sony Computer Entertainment America
- Platform: PlayStation 2
- Release: NA: November 11, 2003
- Genre: Sports (Basketball)
- Modes: Single-player, Multiplayer

NCAA Final Four 2004 is a 2003 basketball video game developed by Killer Game and published by Sony Computer Entertainment for the PlayStation 2. It was only released in North America under 989 Sports. Then-Kansas Jayhawks player Nick Collison is featured on the cover.

== Reception ==
Reception

Aggregate score
Aggregator	Score
Metacritic	45/100

Review scores
Publication	Score
GameRevolution	D−
GameSpot	3.3/10
GameSpy	2/5
GameZone	6.8/10
Official U.S. PlayStation Magazine	2/5
PlayStation: The Official Magazine	6/10
X-Play	1/5

The game received "generally unfavorable reviews" according to the review aggregation website Metacritic.
