= 2004–05 Houston Rockets season =

- Head coach: Jeff Van Gundy
- General manager: Carroll Dawson
- Owner: Leslie Alexander
- Arena: Toyota Center

Results
- Record: 51–31 (.622)
- Place: Division: 3rd (Southwest); Conference: 5th (Western)
- Playoff finish: First Round (lost to Mavericks 3–4)
- Stats at Basketball Reference

Local media
- Television: FSN Southwest; KNWS
- Radio: KILT

The 2004–05 Houston Rockets season was the Rockets' 38th season in the National Basketball Association, and their 34th season in the city of Houston. During the offseason, the Rockets acquired All-Star forward Tracy McGrady and Juwan Howard from the Orlando Magic, acquired All-Star center Dikembe Mutombo from the Chicago Bulls, who acquired him from the New York Knicks, and signed free agent Bob Sura. The Rockets struggled with a 6–11 start to the season, then played around .500 as they traded Jim Jackson to the New Orleans Hornets for David Wesley in late December. The Rockets would later on win eight straight games in February, as McGrady and Yao Ming were both selected to play in the 2005 NBA All-Star Game at Denver. At midseason, the team traded Maurice Taylor to the New York Knicks, and acquired Mike James from the Milwaukee Bucks.

The Rockets won their final seven games finishing third in the Southwest Division with a 51–31 record, which was their first 50-win season since 1997. However, in the first round of the playoffs, they lost to their in-state rival, the Dallas Mavericks in seven games after taking a 2–0 series lead. Following the season, Sura retired.

== Offseason ==
=== NBA draft ===
Round	Pick	Player	Position	Nationality	School/Club
2	55	Luis Flores (traded to Golden State)	Guard	Dominican Republic	Manhattan (Sr.)

== Roster ==
2004–05 Houston Rockets roster
Players

Pos.	No.	Player	Height	Weight	DOB	From
C	42	Vin Baker	6 ft 11 in (2.11 m)	232 lb (105 kg)	1971-11-23	Hartford
G	20	Jon Barry	6 ft 4 in (1.93 m)	195 lb (88 kg)	1969-07-25	Georgia Tech
F	40	Ryan Bowen	6 ft 7 in (2.01 m)	215 lb (98 kg)	1975-11-20	Iowa
F	32	Torraye Braggs	6 ft 8 in (2.03 m)	245 lb (111 kg)	1976-05-15	Xavier
F	5	Juwan Howard	6 ft 9 in (2.06 m)	240 lb (109 kg)	1973-02-07	Michigan
G	13	Mike James	6 ft 2 in (1.88 m)	188 lb (85 kg)	1975-06-23	Duquesne
F	1	Tracy McGrady	6 ft 8 in (2.03 m)	210 lb (95 kg)	1979-05-24	Mt. Zion HS (NC)
C	55	Dikembe Mutombo	7 ft 2 in (2.18 m)	245 lb (111 kg)	1966-06-25	Georgetown
G	25	Moochie Norris	6 ft 1 in (1.85 m)	175 lb (79 kg)	1973-07-27	West Florida
F	35	Scott Padgett	6 ft 9 in (2.06 m)	240 lb (109 kg)	1976-04-19	Kentucky
G	3	Bob Sura	6 ft 5 in (1.96 m)	200 lb (91 kg)	1973-03-25	Florida State
G	17	Charlie Ward	6 ft 2 in (1.88 m)	190 lb (86 kg)	1970-10-12	Florida State
F	30	Clarence Weatherspoon	6 ft 6 in (1.98 m)	240 lb (109 kg)	1970-09-08	Southern Miss
G	7	David Wesley	6 ft 0 in (1.83 m)	190 lb (86 kg)	1970-11-14	Baylor
C	11	Yao Ming	7 ft 6 in (2.29 m)	310 lb (141 kg)	1980-09-12	China

Coaches
Head coach
- Jeff Van Gundy
Assistant(s)
- Steve Clifford
- Patrick Ewing
- Andy Greer
- Tom Thibodeau

Legend
- (DP) Unsigned draft pick
- (FA) Free agent
- (S) Suspended
- Injured

Roster
Updated: March 19, 2005

== Regular season ==
=== Tracy McGrady: 13 points in 35 seconds ===
One notable game during the season was the Rockets' December 9 matchup against the San Antonio Spurs. In the fourth quarter, at 44 seconds left, the score was 76-68 and the Spurs had the lead. With 35 seconds remaining, Tracy McGrady made a three-pointer. Four seconds later, Devin Brown was fouled and made both of his free throws. With 24 seconds remaining, McGrady made another three-pointer. He was fouled by Tim Duncan when he shot the ball. He went to the free throw line and made a free throw, converting a four-point play. With 16 seconds remaining, Scott Padgett intentionally fouled Tim Duncan, and, because the Rockets were over the foul limit, Duncan went to the free throw line and made both of his free throws. Five seconds later, McGrady made yet another three-pointer, this time over Bruce Bowen. This left the Rockets in a two-point deficit. San Antonio took a timeout. At 7.9 seconds remaining, Brent Barry inbounded the ball to Devin Brown. McGrady stole the ball from Brown and ran to the three-point line, where he made another three-pointer, which would be the game-winning shot. The performance is considered by some to be one of McGrady's career highlights and become a Hall of Famer in 2017.

=== Season standings ===
Southwest Division	W	L	PCT	GB	Home	Road	Div
y-San Antonio Spurs	59	23	.720	–	38–3	21–20	10–6
x-Dallas Mavericks	58	24	.707	1	29–12	29–12	11–5
x-Houston Rockets	51	31	.622	8	26–15	25–16	10–6
x-Memphis Grizzlies	45	37	.549	14	26–15	19–22	7–9
e-New Orleans Hornets	18	64	.220	41	11–30	7–34	2–14

#	Western Conference				
#	Team	W	L	PCT	GB
1	z-Phoenix Suns	62	20	.756	—
2	y-San Antonio Spurs	59	23	.720	3
3	y-Seattle SuperSonics	52	30	.634	10
4	x-Dallas Mavericks	58	24	.707	4
5	x-Houston Rockets	51	31	.622	11
6	x-Sacramento Kings	50	32	.610	12
7	x-Denver Nuggets	49	33	.598	13
8	x-Memphis Grizzlies	45	37	.549	17
9	e-Minnesota Timberwolves	44	38	.537	18
10	e-Los Angeles Clippers	37	45	.451	25
11	e-Los Angeles Lakers	34	48	.415	28
12	e-Golden State Warriors	34	48	.415	28
13	e-Portland Trail Blazers	27	55	.329	35
14	e-Utah Jazz	26	56	.317	36
15	e-New Orleans Hornets	18	64	.220	44

== Playoffs ==
2005 playoff game log
First Round: 3–4 (home: 1–2; road: 2–2)

Game	Date	Team	Score	High points	High rebounds	High assists	Location Attendance	Series
1	April 23	@ Dallas	W 98–86	Tracy McGrady (34)	Mutombo, Yao (8)	Tracy McGrady (8)	American Airlines Center; 20,678	1–0
2	April 25	@ Dallas	W 113–111	Yao Ming (33)	McGrady, Yao (8)	Tracy McGrady (10)	American Airlines Center; 20,884	2–0
3	April 28	Dallas	L 102–106	Tracy McGrady (28)	Bob Sura (11)	McGrady, Sura (6)	Toyota Center; 18,199	2–1
4	April 30	Dallas	L 93–97	Tracy McGrady (36)	Dikembe Mutombo (7)	Tracy McGrady (5)	Toyota Center; 18,211	2–2
5	May 2	@ Dallas	L 100–103	Yao Ming (30)	Tracy McGrady (9)	Tracy McGrady (6)	American Airlines Center; 20,894	2–3
6	May 5	Dallas	W 101–83	Tracy McGrady (37)	Dikembe Mutombo (10)	Tracy McGrady (7)	Toyota Center; 18,215	3–3
7	May 7	@ Dallas	L 76–116	Yao Ming (33)	Yao Ming (10)	Tracy McGrady (7)	American Airlines Center; 20,884	3–4

2005 schedule

== Player statistics ==
Legend
GP	Games played	GS	Games started	MPG	Minutes per game
FG%	Field-goal percentage	3P%	3-point field-goal percentage	FT%	Free-throw percentage
RPG	Rebounds per game	APG	Assists per game	SPG	Steals per game
BPG	Blocks per game	PPG	Points per game

=== Regular season ===
Player	GP	GS	MPG	FG%	3P%	FT%	RPG	APG	SPG	BPG	PPG
Vin Baker^{†}	3	0	4.3	.000		1.000	.7	.3	.0	.0	.7
Andre Barrett^{†}	27	0	11.6	.290	.243	.700	.7	1.6	.5	.0	2.1
Jon Barry^{†}	53	2	23.2	.447	.451	.897	2.6	2.6	.9	.1	7.0
Ryan Bowen	66	6	9.2	.423	.500	.667	1.2	.3	.3	.1	1.7
Torraye Braggs	7	0	3.4	.429			1.7	.0	.0	.0	.9
Reece Gaines^{†}	10	0	10.8	.370	.250	.750	1.1	.3	.3	.0	2.6
Juwan Howard	61	47	26.6	.451	.000	.843	5.7	1.5	.5	.1	9.6
Jim Jackson^{†}	24	24	41.3	.417	.367	.909	4.8	3.6	1.0	.0	13.3
Mike James^{†}	27	5	25.6	.433	.393	.764	3.2	2.9	.9	.1	12.4
Brandin Knight	1	0	3.0	.000			.0	1.0	.0	.0	.0
Tyronn Lue^{†}	21	3	22.8	.393	.333	.778	1.9	2.8	.4	.0	6.0
Tracy McGrady	78	78	40.8	.431	.326	.774	6.2	5.7	1.7	.7	25.7
Yao Ming	80	80	30.6	.552		.783	8.4	.8	.4	2.0	18.3
Dikembe Mutombo	80	2	15.2	.498		.741	5.3	.1	.2	1.3	4.0
Boštjan Nachbar^{†}	16	2	12.8	.349	.476	.750	1.9	.6	.1	.0	3.1
Moochie Norris^{†}	6	0	6.5	.188		1.000	.7	.8	.2	.0	1.3
Scott Padgett	66	0	14.3	.421	.397	.725	2.8	.8	.5	.2	4.2
Rod Strickland	16	2	12.3	.209	.500	.900	1.7	2.4	.2	.1	1.8
Bob Sura	61	59	31.5	.427	.355	.750	5.5	5.2	1.1	.1	10.3
Maurice Taylor^{†}	38	16	23.8	.435	.375	.650	4.3	1.4	.4	.3	7.8
Charlie Ward	14	13	25.7	.312	.314	.846	2.8	3.1	1.1	.0	5.4
Clarence Weatherspoon	40	18	13.1	.412		.829	3.1	.4	.2	.2	3.1
David Wesley^{†}	54	53	34.1	.404	.383	.841	2.6	2.9	1.1	.1	10.9

=== Playoffs ===
Player	GP	GS	MPG	FG%	3P%	FT%	RPG	APG	SPG	BPG	PPG
Jon Barry	7	0	26.1	.438	.478	.875	4.1	1.3	.7	.0	8.6
Ryan Bowen	7	3	17.9	.320		.667	2.0	.9	.9	.0	2.6
Mike James	7	0	24.4	.468	.000	.958	1.9	2.3	.9	.3	11.6
Tracy McGrady	7	7	43.0	.456	.370	.824	7.4	6.7	1.6	1.4	30.7
Yao Ming	7	7	31.4	.655		.727	7.7	.7	.3	2.7	21.4
Dikembe Mutombo	7	0	14.4	.545		.769	5.0	.3	.3	1.0	3.1
Moochie Norris	2	0	3.5	.000			.0	.0	.0	.0	.0
Scott Padgett	7	4	15.6	.375	.417	1.000	2.7	.6	.4	.3	3.6
Bob Sura	7	7	26.0	.435	.538	.667	3.9	2.0	1.0	.0	7.9
Clarence Weatherspoon	1	0	1.0				.0	.0	.0	.0	.0
David Wesley	7	7	40.0	.352	.476	.692	3.0	3.3	1.3	.1	8.1

- ^{†} Denotes player spent time with another team in the season. Stats reflect time with the Rockets only.

== Awards and records ==
- Tracy McGrady, All-NBA Third Team

== See also ==
- 2004-05 NBA season
