= 2004–05 Los Angeles Lakers season =

NBA professional basketball team season

- Head coach: Rudy Tomjanovich (resigned); Frank Hamblen (interim)
- General manager: Mitch Kupchak
- Owner: Jerry Buss
- Arena: Staples Center

Results
- Record: 34–48 (.415)
- Place: Division: 5th (Pacific); Conference: 12th (Western)
- Playoff finish: Did not qualify
- Stats at Basketball Reference

Local media
- Television: FSN West; KCAL
- Radio: AM 570 KLAC

The 2004–05 Los Angeles Lakers season was the 57th season of the franchise in the National Basketball Association (NBA), and the 45th in the city of Los Angeles. The previous season had ended with a crushing defeat in five games to the Detroit Pistons in the 2004 NBA Finals, despite the Lakers being heavily favored. The 2004–05 season is best remembered as a tough one for the Lakers, winning only 34 games and missing the playoffs for the first time in 11 years. It was also the Lakers first season since 1995-96 without either center Shaquille O'Neal, who was traded to the Miami Heat for Lamar Odom, Caron Butler, Brian Grant, and future draft picks, or point guard Derek Fisher (who had signed a six-year free agent contract with the Golden State Warriors), two instrumental players to the Lakers' previous three championship victories. The Lakers had the worst team defensive rating in the NBA.

Phil Jackson was also fired in the offseason and replaced by former Houston Rockets head coach Rudy Tomjanovich. However, in February 2005, Tomjanovich's struggle with bladder cancer that had been diagnosed since 2003 forced him to resign after a 24–19 start and be replaced by Jackson's assistant coach Frank Hamblen for the rest of the year. In the offseason, Butler was traded to the Washington Wizards, Hamblen was fired as head coach and Vlade Divac retired.

For the season, the Lakers slightly changed their uniforms, adding the secondary logo to their shorts. They remained in use until 2018.

The Lakers would not miss the playoffs again until 2014. This was the first team since the 1998–99 Chicago Bulls and last until the 2014–15 Miami Heat to miss the playoffs after making a Finals appearance the previous season.

== Draft picks ==
Round	Pick	Player	Nationality	Position	College
1	27	Sašha Vujačić	Slovenia	G	Pallalcesto Amatori Udine (Italy)
2	56	Marcus Douthit	United States	PF/C	Providence

== Roster ==
2004–05 Los Angeles Lakers roster
Players

Pos.	No.	Player	Height	Weight	DOB	From
PG	9	Chucky Atkins	5 ft 11 in (1.80 m)	185 lb (84 kg)	1974–08–14	South Florida
SG	15	Tony Bobbitt	6 ft 4 in (1.93 m)	190 lb (86 kg)	1979–10–22	Cincinnati
PG	5	Tierre Brown	6 ft 2 in (1.88 m)	189 lb (86 kg)	1979–06–03	McNeese State
SG	8	Kobe Bryant	6 ft 6 in (1.98 m)	205 lb (93 kg)	1978–08–23	Lower Merion HS (PA)
SF	1	Caron Butler	6 ft 7 in (2.01 m)	228 lb (103 kg)	1980–03–13	Connecticut
C	43	Brian Cook	6 ft 9 in (2.06 m)	234 lb (106 kg)	1980–12–04	Illinois
C	12	Vlade Divac (injured)	7 ft 1 in (2.16 m)	243 lb (110 kg)	1968–02–03	Serbia
SF	3	Devean George	6 ft 8 in (2.03 m)	235 lb (107 kg)	1977–08–29	Augsburg
C	55	Brian Grant	6 ft 9 in (2.06 m)	254 lb (115 kg)	1972–03–05	Xavier
SF	20	Jumaine Jones	6 ft 8 in (2.03 m)	230 lb (104 kg)	1979–02–10	Georgia
PF	14	Slava Medvedenko	6 ft 10 in (2.08 m)	253 lb (115 kg)	1979–04–04	Ukraine
C	31	Chris Mihm	7 ft 0 in (2.13 m)	265 lb (120 kg)	1979–07–16	Texas
PF	7	Lamar Odom	6 ft 10 in (2.08 m)	230 lb (104 kg)	1979–11–06	Rhode Island
SG	18	Sasha Vujačić	6 ft 7 in (2.01 m)	195 lb (88 kg)	1984–03–08	Slovenia
SF	4	Luke Walton	6 ft 8 in (2.03 m)	235 lb (107 kg)	1980–03–28	Arizona

Coaches
Head coach
- Rudy Tomjanovich
- Frank Hamblen (interim)
Assistant(s)
- Chris Bodaken
- Melvin Hunt
- Brian Shaw
- Mike Wells

Legend
- (DP) Unsigned draft pick
- (FA) Free agent
- (S) Suspended
- Injured

Roster

=== Player Salaries ===
Rank	Player	Salary
1	Kobe Bryant	$14,175,000
2	Brian Grant	$13,233,434
3	Lamar Odom	$10,548,596
4	Vlade Divac	$4,903,000
5	Devean George	$4,546,000
6	Chucky Atkins	$4,200,000
7	Chris Mihm	$3,371,393
8	Stanislav Medvedenko	$3,000,000
9	Caron Butler	$1,930,680
10	Jumaine Jones	$1,687,500
11	Brian Cook	$971,160
12	Sasha Vujacic	$846,840
13	Tierre Brown	$720,046
14	Luke Walton	$620,046
15	Tony Bobbitt	$305,403

== Regular season ==
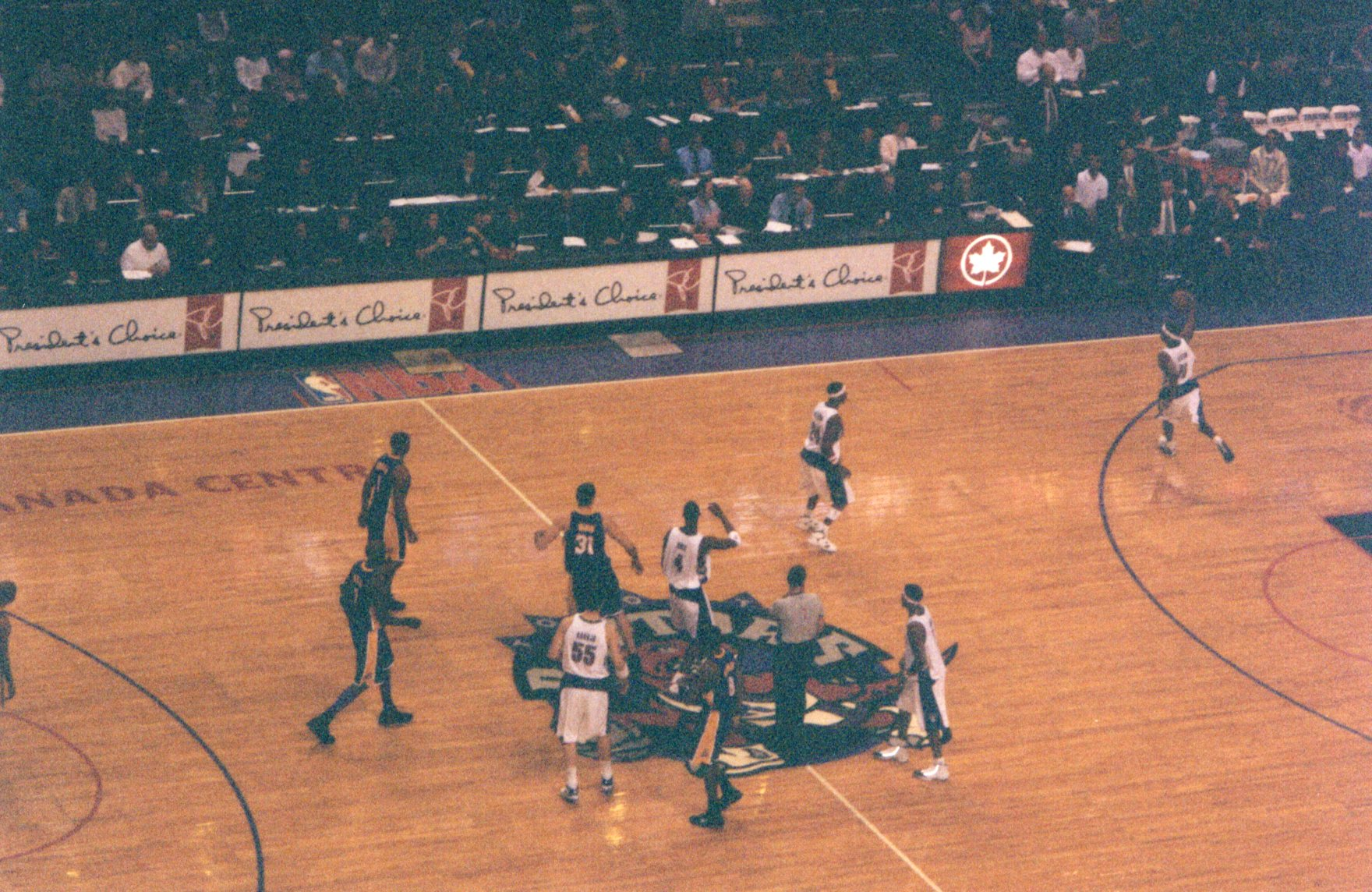
The Lakers at an away game against the Toronto Raptors in February 2005

=== Season standings ===
Pacific Division	W	L	PCT	GB	Home	Road	Div
y-Phoenix Suns	62	20	.756	–	31–10	31–10	12–4
x-Sacramento Kings	50	32	.610	12	30–11	20–21	10–6
e-Los Angeles Clippers	37	45	.451	25	27–14	10–31	6–10
e-Los Angeles Lakers	34	48	.415	28	22–19	12–29	6–10
e-Golden State Warriors	34	48	.415	28	20–21	14–27	6–10

#	Western Conference				
#	Team	W	L	PCT	GB
1	z-Phoenix Suns	62	20	.756	—
2	y-San Antonio Spurs	59	23	.720	3
3	y-Seattle SuperSonics	52	30	.634	10
4	x-Dallas Mavericks	58	24	.707	4
5	x-Houston Rockets	51	31	.622	11
6	x-Sacramento Kings	50	32	.610	12
7	x-Denver Nuggets	49	33	.598	13
8	x-Memphis Grizzlies	45	37	.549	17
9	e-Minnesota Timberwolves	44	38	.537	18
10	e-Los Angeles Clippers	37	45	.451	25
11	e-Los Angeles Lakers	34	48	.415	28
12	e-Golden State Warriors	34	48	.415	28
13	e-Portland Trail Blazers	27	55	.329	35
14	e-Utah Jazz	26	56	.317	36
15	e-New Orleans Hornets	18	64	.220	44

== Game log ==
=== Pre-season ===
2004 preseason game log
Total: 6–2
Preseason

Game	Date	Team	Score	High points	High rebounds	High assists	Location Attendance	Record
1	October 12	Seattle	L 80-87	Kobe Bryant (35)	Chris Mihm (7)	Tierre Brown (7)	Arrowhead Pond (Anaheim, CA); 16,342	0–1
2	October 17	Golden State	W 94-80	Kobe Bryant (23)	Lamar Odom (7)	Kobe Bryant (8)	Centennial Garden (Bakersfield, CA); 7,279	1-1
3	October 19	Sacramento	W 105-80	Caron Butler (18)	4 players tied (6)	3 players tied (5)	Save Mart Center (Fresno, CA); 16,116	2–1
4	October 21	Golden State	L 88-90 (OT)	Kobe Bryant (35)	Chris Mihm (13)	Kobe Bryant (7)	Staples Center; 15,237	2-2
5	October 22	L.A. Clippers	W 113-102	Kobe Bryant (25)	Lamar Odom (9)	Tierre Brown (5)	Staples Center; 16,995	3–2
6	October 24	Phoenix	W 111-103	Brian Grant (22)	Caron Butler (13)	Sasha Vujačić (8)	Thomas & Mack Center (Las Vegas, NV); 14,535	4–2
7	October 25	Seattle	W 117-91	Caron Butler (18)	Jumaine Jones (6)	Sasha Vujačić (8)	San Diego Sports Arena (San Diego, CA); 13,642	5–2
8	October 28	Washington	W 97-87	Kobe Bryant (19)	Lamar Odom (9)	Tierre Brown (6)	Ford Center (Oklahoma City, OK); 8,979	6–2

2004–05 season schedule

=== Regular season ===
2004–05 game log
Total: 34–48 (Home: 22–19; Road: 12-29)
November: 9–6 (home: 6–2; road: 3–4)

Game	Date	Team	Score	High points	High rebounds	High assists	Location Attendance	Record
1	November 2	Denver	W 89-78	Kobe Bryant (25)	Lamar Odom (13)	Kobe Bryant (7)	Staples Center; 18,997	1–0
2	November 3	@ Utah	L 78-104	Kobe Bryant (38)	Lamar Odom (9)	Tierre Brown (2)	Delta Center; 19,911	1-1
3	November 5	San Antonio	L 96-105	Kobe Bryant (28)	Lamar Odom (11)	Bryant & Odom (4)	Staples Center; 18,997	1–2
4	November 7	Atlanta	W 106-90	Kobe Bryant (24)	Lamar Odom (11)	Kobe Bryant (6)	Staples Center; 18,997	2-2
5	November 9	@ New Orleans	W 106-98	Kobe Bryant (31)	Caron Butler (9)	Chucky Atkins (6)	New Orleans Arena; 17,202	3–2
6	November 10	@ Memphis	L 87-110	Kobe Bryant (20)	Lamar Odom (11)	Atkins & Bryant (4)	FedEx Forum; 18,119	3-3
7	November 12	@ Orlando	L 113-122	Kobe Bryant (41)	Lamar Odom (8)	Kobe Bryant (8)	TD Waterhouse Centre; 17,283	3–4
8	November 13	@ Houston	W 84-79	Lamar Odom (20)	Lamar Odom (13)	Lamar Odom (5)	Toyota Center; 18,181	4-4
9	November 17	L.A. Clippers	W 103-89	Kobe Bryant (23)	Brian Grant (7)	Kobe Bryant (11)	Staples Center; 18,997	5–4
10	November 19	@ Phoenix	L 102-107	Kobe Bryant (29)	Lamar Odom (15)	Kobe Bryant (10)	American West Arena; 18,422	5-5
11	November 21	Chicago	W 102-93	Kobe Bryant (29)	Lamar Odom (12)	Kobe Bryant (7)	Staples Center; 18,997	6–5
12	November 23	Milwaukee	W 100-96	Kobe Bryant (30)	Lamar Odom (9)	Tierre Brown (6)	Staples Center; 18,215	7–5
13	November 26	Sacramento	L 106-109	Kobe Bryant (40)	Lamar Odom (14)	Kobe Bryant (8)	Staples Center; 18,997	7–6
14	November 28	New Orleans	W 89-76	Kobe Bryant (20)	Lamar Odom (14)	Kobe Bryant (7)	Staples Center; 18,997	8–6
15	November 30	@ Milwaukee	W 95-90	Brian Cook (25)	Cook & Odom (11)	Kobe Bryant (11)	Bradley Center; 14,975	9–6

December: 6–6 (home: 4–4; road: 2–2)

Game	Date	Team	Score	High points	High rebounds	High assists	Location Attendance	Record
16	December 1	@ Chicago	L 84-92	Kobe Bryant (28)	Lamar Odom (11)	Kobe Bryant (10)	United Center; 18,524	9–7
17	December 3	Golden State	W 97-88	Caron Butler (27)	Kobe Bryant (12)	Kobe Bryant (10)	Staples Center; 18,997	10–7
18	December 8	Phoenix	L 110-113	Kobe Bryant (20)	Kobe Bryant (14)	Kobe Bryant (11)	Staples Center; 18,997	10–8
19	December 11	@ L.A. Clippers	W 89-87	Kobe Bryant (37)	Lamar Odom (12)	Kobe Bryant (5)	Staples Center; 19,697	11–8
20	December 12	Orlando	W 105-98	Jones & Mihm (25)	Chris Mihm (14)	Tierre Brown (8)	Staples Center; 18,997	12–8
21	December 14	@ Seattle	L 93-108	Kobe Bryant (35)	Bryant & Odom (9)	Kobe Bryant (5)	KeyArena; 17,072	12–9
22	December 16	@ Sacramento	W 115-99	Kobe Bryant (31)	Chris Mihm (8)	Kobe Bryant (12)	ARCO Arena; 17,317	13–9
23	December 17	Washington	L 116-120 (OT)	Kobe Bryant (36)	Bryant & Odom (10)	Kobe Bryant (14)	Staples Center; 18,212	13–10
24	December 20	Memphis	L 72-82	Caron Butler (16)	Lamar Odom (12)	Kobe Bryant (8)	Staples Center; 18,997	13–11
25	December 22	New Orleans	W 101-89	Chucky Atkins (30)	Chris Mihm (21)	3 players tied (4)	Staples Center; 18,477	14–11
26	December 25	Miami	L 102-104 (OT)	Kobe Bryant (42)	Chris Mihm (14)	Chucky Atkins (7)	Staples Center; 18,997	14–12
27	December 28	Toronto	W 117-99	Kobe Bryant (48)	Lamar Odom (13)	Chucky Atkins (7)	Staples Center; 18,997	15–12

January: 8–7 (home: 6–3; road: 2–4)

Game	Date	Team	Score	High points	High rebounds	High assists	Location Attendance	Record
28	January 2	Denver	W 99-91	Kobe Bryant (42)	Lamar Odom (15)	3 players tied (4)	Staples Center; 18,997	16–12
29	January 4	@ San Antonio	L 83-100	Kobe Bryant (17)	Lamar Odom (8)	Tierre Brown (5)	SBC Center; 18,797	16–13
30	January 5	@ Dallas	L 104-118	Kobe Bryant (32)	Jumaine Jones (13)	Chucky Atkins (7)	American Airlines Center; 20,393	16–14
31	January 7	Houston	W 111-104	Kobe Bryant (27)	Lamar Odom (12)	Kobe Bryant (10)	Staples Center; 18,997	17–14
32	January 10	@ Minnesota	W 105-96	Kobe Bryant (31)	Chris Mihm (17)	Chucky Atkins (7)	Target Center; 19,356	18–14
33	January 12	@ Denver	L 83-95	Caron Butler (18)	Lamar Odom (12)	Kobe Bryant (7)	Pepsi Center; 18,171	18–15
34	January 13	Cleveland	W 98-94	Lamar Odom (24)	Caron Butler (11)	Lamar Odom (7)	Staples Center; 18,997	19–15
35	January 15	@ Golden State	W 104-102	Lamar Odom (27)	Mihm & Odom (12)	3 players tied (3)	The Arena in Oakland; 19,602	20–15
36	January 17	Utah	L 94-102	Caron Butler (26)	Lamar Odom (10)	Lamar Odom (6)	Staples Center; 18,111	20–16
37	January 19	Minnesota	W 93-90	Chucky Atkins (25)	Jumaine Jones (8)	Chucky Atkins (11)	Staples Center; 18,417	21–16
38	January 21	Golden State	W 105-101	Chucky Atkins (26)	Butler & Jones (9)	Chucky Atkins (10)	Staples Center; 18,997	22–16
39	January 25	Seattle	L 93-104	Odom & Walton (19)	Lamar Odom (13)	Lamar Odom (8)	Staples Center; 18,997	22–17
40	January 26	@ L.A. Clippers	L 89-105	Chucky Atkins (17)	Jumaine Jones (7)	Chucky Atkins (4)	Staples Center; 20,127	22–18
41	January 28	New Jersey	L 103-109	Caron Butler (31)	Lamar Odom (13)	Lamar Odom (8)	Staples Center; 18,997	22–19
42	January 30	Charlotte	W 101-90	Atkins & Butler (20)	Chris Mihm (12)	Lamar Odom (7)	Staples Center; 18,532	23–19

February: 5–8 (home: 3–2; road: 2–6)

Game	Date	Team	Score	High points	High rebounds	High assists	Location Attendance	Record
43	February 1	Portland	W 92-79	Atkins & Butler (19)	Butler & Mihm (10)	Tierre Brown (9)	Staples Center; 18,116	24–19
44	February 3	San Antonio	L 91-103	Lamar Odom (23)	Lamar Odom (13)	Luke Walton (6)	Staples Center; 18,997	24–20
45	February 6	@ Houston	L 102-103	Lamar Odom (22)	Jumaine Jones (13)	Lamar Odom (8)	Toyota Center; 18,201	24–21
46	February 7	@ Atlanta	L 108-114	Lamar Odom (28)	Brian Cook (10)	Chucky Atkins (5)	Philips Arena; 15,633	24–22
47	February 9	@ New Jersey	W 104-103 (OT)	Jumaine Jones (20)	Lamar Odom (19)	Lamar Odom (8)	Continental Airlines Arena; 13,979	25–22
48	February 10	@ Detroit	L 81-103	Lamar Odom (17)	Lamar Odom (9)	Chucky Atkins (5)	The Palace of Auburn Hills; 22,076	25–23
49	February 13	@ Cleveland	L 89-103	Kobe Bryant (26)	Lamar Odom (9)	Kobe Bryant (6)	Gund Arena; 20,562	25–24
50	February 15	Utah	W 102-95	Kobe Bryant (40)	Slava Medvedenko (9)	Kobe Bryant (8)	Staples Center; 18,480	26–24
All-Star Break
51	February 22	Boston	W 104-95	Bryant & Odom (21)	Chris Mihm (15)	Luke Walton (7)	Staples Center; 18,997	27–24
52	February 23	@ Portland	W 86-83	Kobe Bryant (31)	Lamar Odom (12)	Bryant & Odom (6)	Rose Garden; 18,665	28–24
53	February 25	Detroit	L 90-111	Kobe Bryant (20)	Lamar Odom (9)	Kobe Bryant (11)	Staples Center; 18,997	28–25
54	February 27	@ Toronto	L 102-108	Kobe Bryant (31)	Bryant & Odom (8)	Kobe Bryant (8)	Air Canada Centre; 19,800	28–26
55	February 28	@ New York	L 115-117 (OT)	Kobe Bryant (30)	Lamar Odom (15)	Kobe Bryant (8)	Madison Square Garden; 19,763	28–27

March: 5–11 (home: 3–4; road: 2–7)

Game	Date	Team	Score	High points	High rebounds	High assists	Location Attendance	Record
56	March 2	@ Boston	L 101-104	Chucky Atkins (29)	Lamar Odom (13)	Lamar Odom (4)	Fleet Center; 18,624	28-28
57	March 4	Dallas	W 108-103	Kobe Bryant (40)	Lamar Odom (11)	Chucky Atkins (10)	Staples Center; 18,997	29–28
58	March 6	Indiana	W 103-94	Kobe Bryant (37)	Bryant & Mihm (10)	Lamar Odom (7)	Staples Center; 18,997	30–28
59	March 8	L.A. Clippers	L 101-110	Kobe Bryant (41)	Jumaine Jones (8)	Chucky Atkins (6)	Staples Center; 18,225	30–29
60	March 10	@ Dallas	W 100-95	Kobe Bryant (36)	Lamar Odom (14)	Lamar Odom (7)	American Airlines Center; 20,411	31–29
61	March 12	@ Charlotte	W 117-116	Kobe Bryant (32)	Lamar Odom (11)	Kobe Bryant (9)	Charlotte Coliseum; 23,319	32–29
62	March 14	@ Washington	L 81-95	Caron Butler (20)	Caron Butler (11)	Kobe Bryant (6)	MCI Center; 20,173	32–30
63	March 15	@ Philadelphia	L 91-108	Kobe Bryant (20)	Slava Medvedenko (9)	Sasha Vujačić (5)	Wachovia Center; 20,778	32–31
64	March 17	@ Miami	L 89-102	Kobe Bryant (26)	Lamar Odom (11)	Chucky Atkins (6)	American Airlines Arena; 20,272	32-32
65	March 18	@ Indiana	L 97-103	Chucky Atkins (23)	Caron Butler (10)	Kobe Bryant (4)	Conseco Fieldhouse; 18,345	32–33
66	March 20	Seattle	L 100-102	Kobe Bryant (30)	Slava Medvedenko (7)	Chucky Atkins (5)	Staples Center; 18,997	32–34
67	March 22	@ Utah	L 107-115	Kobe Bryant (43)	Brian Grant (8)	Caron Butler (5)	Delta Center; 18,746	32–35
68	March 24	@ Denver	L 96-117	Caron Butler (22)	Butler & Jones (9)	3 players tied (4)	Pepsi Center; 19,866	32–36
69	March 27	Philadelphia	L 89-96	Kobe Bryant (34)	Chris Mihm (11)	Kobe Bryant (5)	Staples Center; 18,347	32–37
70	March 29	New York	W 117-107	Kobe Bryant (32)	Chris Mihm (8)	Bryant & Walton (5)	Staples Center; 18,997	33–37
71	March 31	Minnesota	L 96-105	Kobe Bryant (26)	Chris Mihm (10)	Kobe Bryant (6)	Staples Center; 18,997	33–38

April: 1–10 (home: 0–4; road: 1–6)

Game	Date	Team	Score	High points	High rebounds	High assists	Location Attendance	Record
72	April 2	@ San Antonio	L 94-95	Caron Butler (27)	Bryant & Jones (8)	Kobe Bryant (6)	SBC Center; 18,797	33–39
73	April 3	@ Memphis	L 82-102	Caron Butler (18)	Jumaine Jones (10)	Atkins & Butler (5)	FedEx Forum; 18,119	33–40
74	April 5	@ Phoenix	L 99-125	Caron Butler (30)	Butler & Vujačić (7)	Chucky Atkins (8)	American West Arena; 18,422	33–41
75	April 7	Houston	L 100-114	Caron Butler (24)	Caron Butler (12)	Kobe Bryant (10)	Staples Center; 18,212	33–42
76	April 8	@ Seattle	W 117-94	Kobe Bryant (42)	Jumaine Jones (12)	Bryant & Jones (5)	KeyArena; 17,072	34–42
77	April 10	@ Sacramento	L 105-124	Kobe Bryant (18)	Butler & Grant (5)	Chucky Atkins (9)	ARCO Arena; 17,317	34–43
78	April 11	Phoenix	L 97-108	Kobe Bryant (20)	Caron Butler (11)	Kobe Bryant (10)	Staples Center; 18,997	34–44
79	April 15	Sacramento	L 106-115	Caron Butler (34)	Luke Walton (12)	Luke Walton (9)	Staples Center; 18,997	34–45
80	April 17	Dallas	L 112-114	Kobe Bryant (33)	Jumaine Jones (9)	Kobe Bryant (9)	Staples Center; 18,237	34–46
81	April 18	@ Golden State	L 99-126	Kobe Bryant (22)	Jumaine Jones (11)	Sasha Vujačić (7)	The Arena in Oakland; 20,024	34–47
82	April 20	@ Portland	L 103-106	Kobe Bryant (37)	Chris Mihm (10)	Atkins & Vujačić (7)	Rose Garden; 19,818	34–48

2004–05 season schedule

== Player statistics ==
Legend
GP	Games played	GS	Games started	MPG	Minutes per game
FG%	Field-goal percentage	3P%	3-point field-goal percentage	FT%	Free-throw percentage
RPG	Rebounds per game	APG	Assists per game	SPG	Steals per game
BPG	Blocks per game	PPG	Points per game

Player	GP	GS	MPG	FG%	3P%	FT%	RPG	APG	SPG	BPG	PPG
Chucky Atkins	82	82	35.4	.426	.387	.803	2.4	4.4	.9	.0	13.6
Tony Bobbitt	2	0	6.0	.400	.500	.	1.5	.0	.0	.0	2.5
Tierre Brown	76	0	14.0	.356	.361	.787	1.2	2.0	.4	.0	4.4
Kobe Bryant	66	66	40.7	.433	.339	.816	5.9	6.0	1.3	.8	27.6
Caron Butler	77	77	35.7	.445	.304	.862	5.8	1.9	1.4	.3	15.5
Brian Cook	72	0	15.1	.417	.392	.757	3.0	.5	.3	.4	6.4
Vlade Divac	15	0	8.7	.419	.	.667	2.1	1.3	.3	.1	2.3
Devean George	15	3	20.4	.356	.362	.750	3.5	.9	.5	.1	7.3
Brian Grant	69	8	16.5	.493	.	.722	3.7	.5	.3	.3	3.8
Jumaine Jones	76	23	24.1	.432	.391	.733	5.2	.9	.6	.3	7.6
Stanislav Medvedenko	43	4	9.8	.455	.000	.821	1.8	.3	.2	.0	3.8
Chris Mihm	75	75	24.9	.507	.000	.678	6.7	.7	.2	1.4	9.8
Lamar Odom	64	64	36.3	.473	.308	.695	10.2	3.7	.7	1.0	15.2
Kareem Rush	14	0	6.5	.200	.200	1.000	.7	.2	.1	.1	.9
Sasha Vujacic	35	3	11.5	.282	.270	.947	1.8	1.5	.3	.1	2.9
Luke Walton	61	5	12.6	.411	.262	.708	2.3	1.5	.4	.2	3.2

== Awards and records ==
- Kobe Bryant, All-NBA Third Team

== Transactions ==
- Kareem Rush was traded to the Charlotte Bobcats on December 6, 2004, for a 2005 2nd round draft pick and a 2009 2nd round draft pick.
