= 2004–05 Minnesota Timberwolves season =

NBA professional basketball team season

- Head coach: Flip Saunders (fired); Kevin McHale
- General manager: Kevin McHale
- Owner: Glen Taylor
- Arena: Target Center

Results
- Record: 44–38 (.537)
- Place: Division: 3rd (Northwest); Conference: 9th (Western)
- Playoff finish: Did not qualify
- Stats at Basketball Reference

Local media
- Television: FSN North
- Radio: KFAN

The 2004–05 Minnesota Timberwolves season was the Minnesota Timberwolves’ 16th season competing in the National Basketball Association. After appearing in the Conference Finals the previous season, the Timberwolves played at around .500 for the first half of the season. However, the team began to struggle further into the season, losing six straight games between January and February and slipping below .500. After a 25–26 start, longtime head coach Flip Saunders was fired and replaced with general manager Kevin McHale for the remainder of the season. The Timberwolves improved under McHale's management, but finished the season in third position in the Northwest Division. With a 44–38 regular season record, they missed the playoffs for the first time since 1996. Kevin Garnett led the team in scoring, rebounding and assists, as he was selected for the 2005 NBA All-Star Game. Following the season, Latrell Sprewell retired after turning down a contract extension, Sam Cassell was traded to the Los Angeles Clippers, and McHale was fired as coach. This marked the beginning of over a decade of futility for the Timberwolves. From 2005 to 2018, they failed to make the playoffs.

== Draft picks ==
Round	Pick	Player	Position	Nationality	College
1	30	Forfeited pick			
2	58	Blake Stepp	PG	United States	Gonzaga

== Roster ==
2004–05 Minnesota Timberwolves roster
Players

Pos.	No.	Player	Height	Weight	DOB	From
PG	7	Anthony Carter	6 ft 1 in (1.85 m)	190 lb (86 kg)	1975-06-16	Hawaiʻi
PG	19	Sam Cassell	6 ft 3 in (1.91 m)	185 lb (84 kg)	1969-11-18	Florida State
SG	44	Ndudi Ebi	6 ft 9 in (2.06 m)	200 lb (91 kg)	1984-06-18	Westbury Christian HS (TX)
PF	21	Kevin Garnett	6 ft 11 in (2.11 m)	220 lb (100 kg)	1976-05-19	Farragut Academy (IL)
PF	41	Eddie Griffin	6 ft 10 in (2.08 m)	220 lb (100 kg)	1982-05-30	Seton Hall
SG	23	Trenton Hassell	6 ft 5 in (1.96 m)	200 lb (91 kg)	1979-03-04	Austin Peay
SG	32	Fred Hoiberg	6 ft 4 in (1.93 m)	203 lb (92 kg)	1972-10-15	Iowa State
PG	16	Troy Hudson	6 ft 1 in (1.85 m)	170 lb (77 kg)	1976-03-13	Southern Illinois
C	40	Ervin Johnson	6 ft 11 in (2.11 m)	245 lb (111 kg)	1967-12-21	New Orleans
C	35	Mark Madsen	6 ft 9 in (2.06 m)	240 lb (109 kg)	1976-01-28	Stanford
C	34	Michael Olowokandi	7 ft 0 in (2.13 m)	269 lb (122 kg)	1975-04-03	Pacific
SF	8	Latrell Sprewell	6 ft 5 in (1.96 m)	190 lb (86 kg)	1970-09-08	Alabama
SF	10	Wally Szczerbiak	6 ft 7 in (2.01 m)	244 lb (111 kg)	1977-03-05	Miami (OH)
C	12	John Thomas	6 ft 9 in (2.06 m)	265 lb (120 kg)	1975-09-08	Minnesota

Coaches
Head coach
- Flip Saunders (fired)
- Kevin McHale
Assistant(s)
- Sidney Lowe
- Jerry Sichting
- Randy Wittman
- Don Zierden
- Gregg Farnam (trainer)

Legend
- (DP) Unsigned draft pick
- (FA) Free agent
- (S) Suspended
- Injured

Roster
Updated: November 1, 2004

== Regular season ==
=== Season standings ===
Northwest Division	W	L	PCT	GB	Home	Road	Div
y-Seattle SuperSonics	52	30	.634	–	26–15	26–15	11–5
x-Denver Nuggets	49	33	.598	3	31–10	18–23	9–7
e-Minnesota Timberwolves	44	38	.537	8	24–17	20–21	10–6
e-Portland Trail Blazers	27	55	.329	25	18–23	9–32	4–12
e-Utah Jazz	26	56	.317	26	18–23	8–33	6–10

#	Western Conference				
#	Team	W	L	PCT	GB
1	z-Phoenix Suns	62	20	.756	—
2	y-San Antonio Spurs	59	23	.720	3
3	y-Seattle SuperSonics	52	30	.634	10
4	x-Dallas Mavericks	58	24	.707	4
5	x-Houston Rockets	51	31	.622	11
6	x-Sacramento Kings	50	32	.610	12
7	x-Denver Nuggets	49	33	.598	13
8	x-Memphis Grizzlies	45	37	.549	17
9	e-Minnesota Timberwolves	44	38	.537	18
10	e-Los Angeles Clippers	37	45	.451	25
11	e-Los Angeles Lakers	34	48	.415	28
12	e-Golden State Warriors	34	48	.415	28
13	e-Portland Trail Blazers	27	55	.329	35
14	e-Utah Jazz	26	56	.317	36
15	e-New Orleans Hornets	18	64	.220	44

== Player statistics ==
=== Ragular season ===
Player	POS	GP	GS	MP	REB	AST	STL	BLK	PTS	MPG	RPG	APG	SPG	BPG	PPG
Kevin Garnett	PF	82	82	3,121	1,108	466	121	112	1,817	38.1	13.5	5.7	1.5	1.4	22.2
Trenton Hassell	SG	82	51	2,068	219	128	30	30	541	25.2	2.7	1.6	.4	.4	6.6
Wally Szczerbiak	SF	81	37	2,558	303	191	40	16	1,253	31.6	3.7	2.4	.5	.2	15.5
Latrell Sprewell	SF	80	79	2,450	254	179	53	21	1,021	30.6	3.2	2.2	.7	.3	12.8
Troy Hudson	PG	79	32	1,729	105	283	27	6	691	21.9	1.3	3.6	.3	.1	8.7
Fred Hoiberg	SG	76	0	1,272	181	85	50	15	437	16.7	2.4	1.1	.7	.2	5.8
Eddie Griffin	PF	70	0	1,492	453	53	23	118	527	21.3	6.5	.8	.3	1.7	7.5
Anthony Carter	PG	66	12	742	69	161	35	18	181	11.2	1.0	2.4	.5	.3	2.7
Michael Olowokandi	C	62	34	1,215	324	29	15	56	368	19.6	5.2	.5	.2	.9	5.9
Sam Cassell	PG	59	38	1,522	157	301	36	14	799	25.8	2.7	5.1	.6	.2	13.5
Ervin Johnson	C	46	23	410	113	6	7	13	73	8.9	2.5	.1	.2	.3	1.6
John Thomas	C	44	8	521	97	17	15	13	111	11.8	2.2	.4	.3	.3	2.5
Mark Madsen	C	41	14	601	128	18	7	14	88	14.7	3.1	.4	.2	.3	2.1
Ndudi Ebi	SG	2	0	54	16	1	1	1	27	27.0	8.0	.5	.5	.5	13.5

== Awards and records ==
- Kevin Garnett, NBA All-Defensive First Team
