= 2004–05 Memphis Grizzlies season =

- Head coach: Hubie Brown (resigned); Lionel Hollins (interim); Mike Fratello
- President: Jerry West
- General manager: Dick Versace
- Owner: Michael Heisley
- Arena: FedExForum

Results
- Record: 45–37 (.549)
- Place: Division: 4th (Southwest); Conference: 8th (Western)
- Playoff finish: First Round (lost to Suns 0–4)
- Stats at Basketball Reference

Local media
- Television: FSN South
- Radio: WREC

The 2004–05 Memphis Grizzlies season was the Grizzlies' tenth season in the National Basketball Association, and their fourth season in Memphis, Tennessee. Coming off their first playoff appearance in franchise history, the Grizzlies had a new look and moved into their new arena, the FedExForum. However, the team struggled with a 5–7 start as 71-year-old Hubie Brown retired from coaching due to "unexpected health problems". The Grizzlies would lose their next four games under Lionel Hollins before replacing him with TNT analyst Mike Fratello. Under Fratello, the Grizzlies would win 12 of their 15 games in January climbing back into playoff contention. Despite losing five of their last six games, the Grizzlies finished fourth in the Southwest Division with a 45–37 record, making their second consecutive trip to the playoffs.

However, in the first round of the playoffs, they were swept by the top-seeded Phoenix Suns in four straight games. Following the season, Bonzi Wells was traded to the Sacramento Kings, Jason Williams and James Posey were both dealt to the Miami Heat, and Stromile Swift signed as a free agent with the Houston Rockets.

For the season, they debuted a new logo and new uniforms that replaced the teal, brown, red, and black color scheme with blue, navy, yellow, and grey and added side panels to their jerseys and shorts. This version of the uniforms remained in use until 2018.

== Draft picks ==
Round	Pick	Player	Position	Nationality	College
2	49	Sergei Lishouk	C/PF	Ukraine	

== Roster ==
2004–05 Memphis Grizzlies roster
Players

Pos.	No.	Player	Height	Weight	DOB	From
SF	31	Shane Battier	6 ft 8 in (2.03 m)	220 lb (100 kg)	1978–09–09	Duke
PG	1	Antonio Burks	6 ft 1 in (1.85 m)	200 lb (91 kg)	1980–02–25	Memphis
PF	35	Brian Cardinal	6 ft 8 in (2.03 m)	245 lb (111 kg)	1977–05–02	Purdue
SG	14	Andre Emmett	6 ft 5 in (1.96 m)	230 lb (104 kg)	1982–08–27	Texas Tech
PF/C	16	Pau Gasol	7 ft 0 in (2.13 m)	250 lb (113 kg)	1980–07–06	Spain
PF	40	Ryan Humphrey	6 ft 8 in (2.03 m)	235 lb (107 kg)	1979–07–24	Notre Dame
SG	30	Dahntay Jones	6 ft 6 in (1.98 m)	225 lb (102 kg)	1980–12–27	Duke
SG	33	Mike Miller	6 ft 8 in (2.03 m)	218 lb (99 kg)	1980–02–19	Florida
SF	41	James Posey	6 ft 8 in (2.03 m)	217 lb (98 kg)	1977–01–13	Xavier
PF	4	Stromile Swift	6 ft 9 in (2.06 m)	225 lb (102 kg)	1979–11–21	LSU
C	12	Jake Tsakalidis	7 ft 2 in (2.18 m)	290 lb (132 kg)	1979–06–10	Republic of Georgia
PG	25	Earl Watson	6 ft 1 in (1.85 m)	199 lb (90 kg)	1979–06–12	UCLA
SG	6	Bonzi Wells	6 ft 5 in (1.96 m)	210 lb (95 kg)	1976–09–28	Ball State
PG	2	Jason Williams	6 ft 1 in (1.85 m)	180 lb (82 kg)	1975–11–18	Florida
C	42	Lorenzen Wright	6 ft 11 in (2.11 m)	255 lb (116 kg)	1975–11–04	Memphis

Coaches
Head coach
- Hubie Brown (resigned)
- Lionel Hollins (interim)
- Mike Fratello
Assistant(s)
- Mitchell Anderson
- Tony Barone
- Brendan Brown
- Eric Musselman
- Hal Wissel

Legend
- (DP) Unsigned draft pick
- (FA) Free agent
- (S) Suspended
- Injured

Roster
Updated: November 1, 2004

== Regular season ==
=== Season standings ===
Southwest Division	W	L	PCT	GB	Home	Road	Div
y-San Antonio Spurs	59	23	.720	–	38–3	21–20	10–6
x-Dallas Mavericks	58	24	.707	1	29–12	29–12	11–5
x-Houston Rockets	51	31	.622	8	26–15	25–16	10–6
x-Memphis Grizzlies	45	37	.549	14	26–15	19–22	7–9
e-New Orleans Hornets	18	64	.220	41	11–30	7–34	2–14

#	Western Conference				
#	Team	W	L	PCT	GB
1	z-Phoenix Suns	62	20	.756	—
2	y-San Antonio Spurs	59	23	.720	3
3	y-Seattle SuperSonics	52	30	.634	10
4	x-Dallas Mavericks	58	24	.707	4
5	x-Houston Rockets	51	31	.622	11
6	x-Sacramento Kings	50	32	.610	12
7	x-Denver Nuggets	49	33	.598	13
8	x-Memphis Grizzlies	45	37	.549	17
9	e-Minnesota Timberwolves	44	38	.537	18
10	e-Los Angeles Clippers	37	45	.451	25
11	e-Los Angeles Lakers	34	48	.415	28
12	e-Golden State Warriors	34	48	.415	28
13	e-Portland Trail Blazers	27	55	.329	35
14	e-Utah Jazz	26	56	.317	36
15	e-New Orleans Hornets	18	64	.220	44

z – clinched division title
y – clinched division title
x – clinched playoff spot

== Playoffs ==
2005 playoff game log
First round: 0–4 (home: 0–2; road: 0–2)

Game	Date	Team	Score	High points	High rebounds	High assists	Location Attendance	Series
1	April 24	@ Phoenix	L 103–114	Mike Miller (19)	Shane Battier (9)	Jason Williams (5)	America West Arena; 18,422	0–1
2	April 27	@ Phoenix	L 103–108	Pau Gasol (28)	Pau Gasol (16)	Pau Gasol (5)	America West Arena; 18,422	0–2
3	April 29	Phoenix	L 90–110	Lorenzen Wright (14)	three players tied (8)	Jason Williams (6)	FedExForum; 18,119	0–3
4	May 1	Phoenix	L 115–123	Pau Gasol (28)	Dahntay Jones (5)	Jason Williams (8)	FedExForum; 17,243	0–4

2005 schedule

== Player statistics ==
=== Regular season ===
Player	POS	GP	GS	MP	REB	AST	STL	BLK	PTS	MPG	RPG	APG	SPG	BPG	PPG
Lorenzen Wright	C	80	77	2,287	613	87	58	69	771	28.6	7.7	1.1	.7	.9	9.6
Shane Battier	SG	80	72	2,516	413	126	91	77	792	31.5	5.2	1.6	1.1	1.0	9.9
Earl Watson	PG	80	14	1,808	164	359	83	19	615	22.6	2.1	4.5	1.0	.2	7.7
Mike Miller	SF	76	51	2,278	300	220	54	23	1,022	30.0	3.9	2.9	.7	.3	13.4
Jason Williams	PG	71	68	1,952	122	399	75	5	719	27.5	1.7	5.6	1.1	.1	10.1
Bonzi Wells	SG	69	19	1,489	229	80	85	27	721	21.6	3.3	1.2	1.2	.4	10.4
Stromile Swift	PF	60	14	1,279	273	43	41	92	604	21.3	4.6	.7	.7	1.5	10.1
Brian Cardinal	PF	58	16	1,433	225	114	88	19	522	24.7	3.9	2.0	1.5	.3	9.0
Pau Gasol	PF	56	53	1,790	410	135	37	93	997	32.0	7.3	2.4	.7	1.7	17.8
Dahntay Jones	SG	52	7	649	69	21	13	11	233	12.5	1.3	.4	.3	.2	4.5
James Posey	SF	50	18	1,382	219	88	48	23	405	27.6	4.4	1.8	1.0	.5	8.1
Ryan Humphrey	SF	35	0	317	87	6	10	1	102	9.1	2.5	.2	.3	.0	2.9
Jake Tsakalidis	C	31	1	278	56	10	3	16	78	9.0	1.8	.3	.1	.5	2.5
Antonio Burks	PG	24	0	219	12	28	13	1	73	9.1	.5	1.2	.5	.0	3.0
Andre Emmett	SG	8	0	28	2	0	0	0	7	3.5	.3	.0	.0	.0	.9

=== Playoffs ===
Player	POS	GP	GS	MP	REB	AST	STL	BLK	PTS	MPG	RPG	APG	SPG	BPG	PPG
Pau Gasol	PF	4	4	133	30	10	2	7	85	33.3	7.5	2.5	.5	1.8	21.3
Shane Battier	SG	4	4	119	27	6	2	4	29	29.8	6.8	1.5	.5	1.0	7.3
Jason Williams	PG	4	4	114	9	21	6	0	68	28.5	2.3	5.3	1.5	.0	17.0
Mike Miller	SF	4	4	110	10	11	0	3	48	27.5	2.5	2.8	.0	.8	12.0
Lorenzen Wright	C	4	4	85	20	9	1	1	33	21.3	5.0	2.3	.3	.3	8.3
James Posey	SF	4	0	100	13	4	2	1	39	25.0	3.3	1.0	.5	.3	9.8
Brian Cardinal	PF	4	0	78	12	2	3	0	26	19.5	3.0	.5	.8	.0	6.5
Earl Watson	PG	4	0	74	10	15	3	1	19	18.5	2.5	3.8	.8	.3	4.8
Dahntay Jones	SG	3	0	71	9	1	1	0	22	23.7	3.0	.3	.3	.0	7.3
Stromile Swift	PF	3	0	48	14	1	1	0	28	16.0	4.7	.3	.3	.0	9.3
Bonzi Wells	SG	2	0	25	4	3	2	1	14	12.5	2.0	1.5	1.0	.5	7.0
Antonio Burks	PG	1	0	3	0	1	0	0	0	3.0	.0	1.0	.0	.0	.0

== See also ==
- 2004–05 NBA season
