= 2004–05 Sacramento Kings season =

NBA professional basketball team season

- Head coach: Rick Adelman
- President: Geoff Petrie
- General manager: Geoff Petrie
- Owners: Maloof family
- Arena: ARCO Arena

Results
- Record: 50–32 (.610)
- Place: Division: 2nd (Pacific); Conference: 6th (Western)
- Playoff finish: First Round (lost to SuperSonics 1–4)
- Stats at Basketball Reference

Local media
- Television: CSN West; KXTV

The 2004–05 Sacramento Kings season was the Kings' 56th season in the National Basketball Association, and their 20th season in Sacramento. The Kings struggled losing four of their first five games, but would then win 12 of their next 13 games. However, as the season progressed, the Kings would trade away their top players. Doug Christie was traded to the Orlando Magic for Cuttino Mobley in January, and All-Star forward Chris Webber was dealt to the Philadelphia 76ers for Kenny Thomas and former Kings' forward Corliss Williamson in February. Still, the Kings managed to finish second in the Pacific Division with a solid 50–32 record, clinching a sixth spot in the Western Conference. However, in the playoffs, the Kings failed to make it out of the first round, losing to the Seattle SuperSonics in five games. Following the season, Mobley signed as a free agent with the Los Angeles Clippers, and Bobby Jackson was traded to the Memphis Grizzlies.

== Offseason ==
=== Draft picks ===
Round	Pick	Player	Position	Nationality	College
1	26	Kevin Martin	SG	United States	Western Carolina
2	48	Ricky Minard	SG	United States	Morehead State

== Roster ==
Sacramento Kings roster
Players

Pos.	No.	Player	Height	Weight	DOB	From
G	10	Mike Bibby	6 ft 1 in (1.85 m)	190 lb (86 kg)		Arizona
F	15	Erik Daniels	6 ft 8 in (2.03 m)	214 lb (97 kg)		Kentucky
G/F	5	Maurice Evans	6 ft 5 in (1.96 m)	220 lb (100 kg)		Texas
G	50	Eddie House	6 ft 1 in (1.85 m)	180 lb (82 kg)		Arizona State
G	24	Bobby Jackson	6 ft 1 in (1.85 m)	185 lb (84 kg)		Minnesota
G	23	Kevin Martin	6 ft 7 in (2.01 m)	199 lb (90 kg)		Western Carolina
F/C	52	Brad Miller	6 ft 11 in (2.11 m)	244 lb (111 kg)		Purdue
G/F	3	Cuttino Mobley	6 ft 4 in (1.93 m)	190 lb (86 kg)		Rhode Island
C	00	Greg Ostertag	7 ft 2 in (2.18 m)	280 lb (127 kg)		Kansas
F/C	54	Brian Skinner	6 ft 9 in (2.06 m)	255 lb (116 kg)		Baylor
F/C	25	Darius Songaila	6 ft 9 in (2.06 m)	248 lb (112 kg)		Wake Forest
F	16	Peja Stojaković	6 ft 9 in (2.06 m)	220 lb (100 kg)		Serbia and Montenegro
F	9	Kenny Thomas	6 ft 7 in (2.01 m)	261 lb (118 kg)		New Mexico
F	34	Corliss Williamson	6 ft 7 in (2.01 m)	245 lb (111 kg)		Arkansas

Coaches
Head coach
- Rick Adelman (Loyola Marymount)
Assistant(s)
- Bubba Burrage (Cal Poly)
- Pete Carril (Lafayette)
- T. R. Dunn (Alabama)
- Elston Turner (Mississippi)

Legend
- (DP) Unsigned draft pick
- (FA) Free agent
- (S) Suspended
- Injured

Roster

== Regular season ==
=== Season standings ===
Pacific Division	W	L	PCT	GB	Home	Road	Div
y-Phoenix Suns	62	20	.756	–	31–10	31–10	12–4
x-Sacramento Kings	50	32	.610	12	30–11	20–21	10–6
e-Los Angeles Clippers	37	45	.451	25	27–14	10–31	6–10
e-Los Angeles Lakers	34	48	.415	28	22–19	12–29	6–10
e-Golden State Warriors	34	48	.415	28	20–21	14–27	6–10

#	Western Conference				
#	Team	W	L	PCT	GB
1	z-Phoenix Suns	62	20	.756	—
2	y-San Antonio Spurs	59	23	.720	3
3	y-Seattle SuperSonics	52	30	.634	10
4	x-Dallas Mavericks	58	24	.707	4
5	x-Houston Rockets	51	31	.622	11
6	x-Sacramento Kings	50	32	.610	12
7	x-Denver Nuggets	49	33	.598	13
8	x-Memphis Grizzlies	45	37	.549	17
9	e-Minnesota Timberwolves	44	38	.537	18
10	e-Los Angeles Clippers	37	45	.451	25
11	e-Los Angeles Lakers	34	48	.415	28
12	e-Golden State Warriors	34	48	.415	28
13	e-Portland Trail Blazers	27	55	.329	35
14	e-Utah Jazz	26	56	.317	36
15	e-New Orleans Hornets	18	64	.220	44

z – clinched division title
y – clinched division title
x – clinched playoff spot

=== Game log ===
2004–05 game log
Total: 50–32 (home: 30–11; road: 20–21)
November: 9–5 (home: 6–1; road: 3–4)

Game	Date	Team	Score	High points	High rebounds	High assists	Location Attendance	Record
1	November 2	@ Dallas	L 98–107	Brad Miller (24)	Chris Webber (10)	Mike Bibby (6)	American Airlines Center; 20,041	0–1
2	November 3	@ San Antonio	L 85–101	Mike Bibby (23)	Chris Webber (9)	Chris Webber (4)	SBC Center; 18,797	0–2
3	November 6	@ Houston	L 101–104 (OT)	Mike Bibby (31)	Chris Webber (13)	Bibby, Webber (7)	Toyota Center; 18,003	0–3
4	November 9	Toronto	W 108–92	Miller, Webber (21)	Brad Miller (12)	Bibby, Webber (11)	ARCO Arena; 17,317	1–3
5	November 10	@ Seattle	L 78–108	Brad Miller (17)	Brad Miller (9)	Mike Bibby (5)	KeyArena; 14,355	1–4
6	November 13	@ Phoenix	W 113–111	Chris Webber (28)	Chris Webber (10)	Mike Bibby (7)	America West Arena; 18,422	2–4
7	November 14	Denver	W 101–89	Brad Miller (26)	Miller, Webber (9)	Bibby, Webber (5)	ARCO Arena; 17,317	3–4
8	November 16	Chicago	W 113–106	Peja Stojaković (29)	Chris Webber (13)	Chris Webber (6)	ARCO Arena; 17,317	4–4
9	November 19	Memphis	W 107–105	Chris Webber (31)	Chris Webber (12)	Doug Christie (9)	ARCO Arena; 17,317	5–4
10	November 21	Milwaukee	W 88–79	Peja Stojaković (21)	Chris Webber (14)	Doug Christie (6)	ARCO Arena; 17,317	6–4
11	November 23	Houston	W 102–96	Peja Stojaković (22)	Mike Bibby (9)	Mike Bibby (8)	ARCO Arena; 17,317	7–4
12	November 26	@ L.A. Lakers	W 109–106	Peja Stojaković (26)	Chris Webber (16)	Chris Webber (7)	Staples Center; 18,997	8–4
13	November 28	Minnesota	L 110–121	Chris Webber (25)	Chris Webber (10)	Mike Bibby (7)	ARCO Aena; 17,317	8–5
14	November 30	@ Memphis	W 98–93	Peja Stojaković (29)	Chris Webber (11)	Doug Christie (7)	FedExForum; 14,192	9–5

December: 9–4 (home: 5–3; road: 4–1)

Game	Date	Team	Score	High points	High rebounds	High assists	Location Attendance	Record
15	December 1	@ New Orleans	W 94–81	Brad Miller (24)	Webber, Bibby (7)	Chris Webber (9)	New Orleans Arena; 12,133	10–5
16	December 3	Indiana	W 113–87	Chris Webber (29)	Brad Miller (13)	Doug Christie (9)	ARCO Arena; 17,317	11–5
17	December 5	Boston	W 119–105	Peja Stojaković (27)	Miller, Webber (10)	Mike Bibby (10)	ARCO Arena; 17,317	12–5
18	December 7	Charlotte	W 109–92	Peja Stojaković (30)	Peja Stojaković (12)	Doug Christie (9)	ARCO Arena; 17,317	13–5
19	December 10	@ Minnesota	L 105–113	Chris Webber (25)	Brad Miller (9)	Bibby, Webber (7)	Target Center; 19,101	13–6
20	December 11	@ Indiana	W 97–92 (OT)	Chris Webber (26)	Brad Miller (13)	Brad Miller (7)	Conseco Fieldhouse; 17,091	14–6
21	December 14	@ Milwaukee	W 89–86	Mike Bibby (27)	Brad Miller (11)	Mike Bibby (9)	Bradley Center; 13,687	15–6
22	December 16	L.A. Lakers	L 99–115	Chris Webber (20)	Darius Songaila (10)	Doug Christie (7)	ARCO Arena; 17,317	15–7
23	December 19	New Orleans	W 107–71	Peja Stojaković (21)	Darius Songaila (11)	Christie, Miller (6)	ARCO Arena; 17,317	16–7
24	December 21	Washington	W 104–93	Peja Stojaković (26)	Chris Webber (10)	Doug Christie (9)	ARCO Arena; 17,317	17–7
25	December 23	Miami	L 107–109	Chris Webber (26)	Greg Ostertag (10)	Mike Bibby (8)	ARCO Arena; 17,317	17–8
26	December 26	Golden State	L 94–98	Chris Webber (28)	Brad Miller (13)	Brad Miller (7)	ARCO Arena; 17,317	17–9
27	December 31	@ Utah	W 109–102	Peja Stojaković (26)	Brad Miller (10)	Mike Bibby (9)	Delta Center; 19,911	18–9

January: 12–4 (home: 7–1; road: 5–3)

Game	Date	Team	Score	High points	High rebounds	High assists	Location Attendance	Record
28	January 2	San Antonio	W 86–81	Peja Stojaković (28)	Chris Webber (13)	Chris Webber (7)	ARCO Arena; 17,317	19–9
29	January 4	@ New York	W 105–98	Chris Webber (22)	Chris Webber (11)	Mike Bibby (7)	Madison Square Garden; 19,763	20–9
30	January 5	@ Toronto	L 93–96	Mike Bibby (32)	Brad Miller (19)	Chris Webber (6)	Air Canada Centre; 18,288	20–10
31	January 7	@ Atlanta	W 100–97	Mike Bibby (31)	Chris Webber (8)	Mike Bibby (6)	Philips Arena; 13,626	21–10
32	January 8	@ New Orleans	L 117–121 (OT)	Peja Stojaković (37)	Brad Miller (16)	Mike Bibby (8)	New Orleans Arena; 14,635	21–11
33	January 11	Denver	W 109–100	Peja Stojaković (27)	Miller, Songaila (8)	Mike Bibby (7)	ARCO Arena; 17,317	22–11
34	January 13	Utah	W 107–93	Peja Stojaković (27)	Chris Webber (15)	Miller, Webber, Barnes (4)	ARCO Arena; 17,317	23–11
35	January 15	L.A. Clippers	W 99–95	Chris Webber (36)	Chris Webber (10)	Mike Bibby (8)	ARCO Arena; 17,317	24–11
36	January 17	@ L.A. Clippers	W 89–83	Chris Webber (23)	Chris Webber (14)	Chris Webber (6)	Staples Center; 17,139	25–11
37	January 18	Portland	W 113–107 (OT)	Chris Webber (32)	Chris Webber (13)	Mike Bibby (9)	ARCO Arena; 17,317	26–11
38	January 20	Cleveland	W 123–96	Chris Webber (27)	Chris Webber (13)	Mike Bibby (11)	ARCO Arena; 17,317	27–11
39	January 23	San Antonio	L 73–103	Mike Bibby (13)	Brad Miller (14)	Greg Ostertag (3)	ARCO Arena; 17,317	27–12
40	January 25	New Jersey	W 113–93	Brad Miller (31)	Brad Miller (12)	Mobley, Bibby (10)	ARCO Arena; 17,317	28–12
41	January 27	@ San Antonio	L 80–90	Brad Miller (19)	Chris Webber (8)	Bibby, Webber (6)	SBC Center; 18,797	28–13
42	January 28	@ Houston	W 117–111 (OT)	Chris Webber (30)	Brad Miller (14)	Mike Bibby (14)	Toyota Center; 18,191	29–13
43	January 30	@ Minnesota	W 94–84	Brad Miller (27)	Brad Miller (15)	Mike Bibby (8)	Target Center; 18,722	30–13

February: 6–8 (home: 2–3; road: 4–5)

Game	Date	Team	Score	High points	High rebounds	High assists	Location Attendance	Record
44	February 1	Seattle	L 101–106	Mike Bibby (25)	Matt Barnes (8)	Brad Miller (6)	ARCO Arena; 17,317	30–14
45	February 2	@ Golden State	W 111–107 (OT)	Brad Miller (38)	Brad Miller (17)	Mike Bibby (11)	The Arena in Oakland; 17,347	31–14
46	February 4	New York	W 116–115	Mike Bibby (40)	Brad Miller (9)	Mike Bibby (7)	ARCO Arena; 17,317	32–14
47	February 5	@ Portland	L 108–114	Mike Bibby (35)	Chris Webber (13)	Chris Webber (10)	Rose Garden; 19,002	32–15
48	February 8	Phoenix	L 123–125	Mike Bibby (27)	Webber, Miller (10)	Chris Webber (12)	ARCO Arena; 17,317	32–16
49	February 10	@ Seattle	L 107–115	Peja Stojaković (28)	Chris Webber (9)	Chris Webber (9)	KeyArena; 16,629	32–17
50	February 11	Dallas	L 113–115	Mike Bibby (25)	Chris Webber (11)	Bibby, Webber, Miller, Mobley, Barnes (4)	ARCO Arena; 17,317	32–18
51	February 13	@ Boston	W 104–100	Mike Bibby (27)	Chris Webber (17)	Chris Webber (12)	FleetCenter; 14,252	33–18
52	February 15	@ Chicago	L 102–107	Brad Miller (23)	Miller, Webber (9)	Bibby, Miller (7)	United Center; 21,789	33–19
53	February 16	@ New Jersey	L 85–96	Mike Bibby (25)	Chris Webber (10)	Miller, Webber (5)	Continental Airlines Arena; 12,227	33–20
54	February 22	Atlanta	W 114–104	Chris Webber (30)	Brad Miller (14)	Miller, Webber, Bibby (7)	ARCO Arena; 17,317	34–20
55	February 24	@ Dallas	L 113–122	Mobley, Bibby (26)	Brad Miller (15)	Mike Bibby (8)	American Airlines Center; 20,377	34–21
56	February 26	@ Philadelphia	W 101–99	Mike Bibby (19)	Kenny Thomas (10)	Mike Bibby (8)	Wachovia Center; 21,068	35–21
57	February 27	@ Washington	W 110–108	Mike Bibby (38)	Kenny Thomas (12)	Mike Bibby (7)	MCI Center; 20,173	36–21

March: 8–8 (home: 7–2; road: 1–6)

Game	Date	Team	Score	High points	High rebounds	High assists	Location Attendance	Record
58	March 1	@ Charlotte	L 87–94	Corliss Williamson (18)	Brian Skinner (16)	Mike Bibby (4)	Charlotte Coliseum; 11,790	36–22
59	March 2	@ Orlando	L 111–114	Peja Stojaković (28)	Darius Songaila (7)	Mike Bibby (10)	TD Waterhouse Centre; 13,568	36–23
60	March 4	@ Miami	L 83–104	Mike Bibby (22)	Brian Skinner (11)	Mike Bibby (7)	American Airlines Arena; 20,122	36–24
61	March 6	Detroit	W 100–85	Mike Bibby (19)	Brian Skinner (12)	Mike Bibby (11)	ARCO Arena; 17,317	37–24
62	March 8	Memphis	W 85–82	Mike Bibby (26)	Maurice Evans (14)	Mike Bibby (5)	ARCO Arena; 17,317	38–24
63	March 11	L.A. Clippers	W 113–112	Mike Bibby (28)	Skinner, Thomas (9)	Mike Bibby (12)	ARCO Arena; 17,317	39–24
64	March 13	Houston	L 96–111	Peja Stojaković (21)	Brian Skinner (11)	Mike Bibby (12)	ARCO Arena; 17,317	39–25
65	March 15	Orlando	W 105–94	Peja Stojaković (27)	Brian Skinner (11)	Mike Bibby (10)	ARCO Arena; 17,317	40–25
66	March 17	@ Golden State	L 97–100	Cuttino Mobley (28)	Brian Skinner (11)	Mike Bibby (8)	The Arena in Oakland; 17,836	40–26
67	March 19	@ L.A. Clippers	W 111–107 (OT)	Stojaković, Mobley (24)	Brian Skinner (9)	Mike Bibby (6)	Staples Center; 19,816	41–26
68	March 20	Golden State	L 94–104	Mike Bibby (24)	Darius Songaila (9)	Mike Bibby (8)	ARCO Arena; 17,317	41–27
69	March 22	Portland	W 112–93	Kenny Thomas (24)	Kenny Thomas (9)	Mike Bibby (10)	ARCO Arena; 17,317	42–27
70	March 24	Dallas	W 109–101	Peja Stojaković (38)	Peja Stojaković (9)	Mike Bibby (8)	ARCO Arena; 17,317	43–27
71	March 26	@ Denver	L 99–113	Peja Stojaković (24)	Brian Skinner (8)	Kenny Thomas (5)	Pepsi Center; 19,729	43–28
72	March 28	Philadelphia	W 118–109	Cuttino Mobley (30)	Brian Skinner (19)	Mobley, Skinner, Bibby (5)	ARCO Arena; 17,317	44–28
73	March 30	@ Detroit	L 82–99	Mike Bibby (26)	Kenny Thomas (11)	Mike Bibby (8)	The Palace of Auburn Hills; 22,076	44–29

April: 6–3 (home: 3–1; road: 3–2)

Game	Date	Team	Score	High points	High rebounds	High assists	Location Attendance	Record
74	April 1	@ Cleveland	W 128–109	Mobley, Bibby, Stojaković (22)	Thomas, Evans (8)	Mike Bibby (9)	Gund Arena; 20,562	45–29
75	April 3	Minnesota	L 100–112	Peja Stojaković (25)	Kenny Thomas (16)	Mike Bibby (4)	ARCO Arena; 17,317	45–30
76	April 5	Seattle	W 122–101	Peja Stojaković (24)	Kenny Thomas (8)	Mike Bibby (10)	ARCO Arena; 17,317	46–30
77	April 8	@ Portland	W 119–115	Peja Stojaković (35)	Brian Skinner (16)	Mike Bibby (11)	Rose Garden; 17,539	47–30
78	April 10	L.A. Lakers	W 124–105	Kenny Thomas (32)	Kenny Thomas (14)	Mike Bibby (8)	ARCO Arena; 17,317	48–30
79	April 15	@ L.A. Lakers	W 115–106	Mike Bibby (26)	Kenny Thomas (9)	Cuttino Mobley (10)	Staples Center; 18,997	49–30
80	April 16	@ Phoenix	L 98–116	Eddie House (17)	Thomas, Ostertag (8)	Bibby, Ostertag (5)	America West Arena; 18,422	49–31
81	April 18	@ Utah	L 82–92	Mike Bibby (26)	Darius Songaila (11)	Mike Bibby (6)	Delta Center; 18,603	49–32
82	April 20	Phoenix	W 132–107	Mobley, Williamson, Songaila (19)	Greg Ostertag (10)	Kenny Thomas (8)	ARCO Arena; 17,317	50–32

2004–05 schedule

== Playoffs ==
2005 playoff game log
First Round: 1–4 (home: 1–1; road: 0–3)

Game	Date	Team	Score	High points	High rebounds	High assists	Location Attendance	Series
1	April 23	@ Seattle	L 82–87	Peja Stojaković (24)	Kenny Thomas (8)	Mike Bibby (4)	KeyArena; 17,072	0–1
2	April 26	@ Seattle	L 93–105	Bobby Jackson (17)	Peja Stojaković (10)	Mike Bibby (8)	KeyArena; 17,072	0–2
3	April 29	Seattle	W 116–104	Mike Bibby (31)	Bibby, Thomas (7)	Mike Bibby (4)	ARCO Arena; 17,317	1–2
4	May 1	Seattle	L 102–115	Peja Stojaković (25)	Kenny Thomas (14)	Mike Bibby (7)	ARCO Arena; 17,317	1–3
5	May 3	@ Seattle	L 118–122	Peja Stojaković (38)	Miller, Thomas (6)	Brad Miller (11)	KeyArena; 17,072	1–4

2005 schedule

== Player statistics ==
Legend
GP	Games played	GS	Games started	MPG	Minutes per game
FG%	Field-goal percentage	3P%	3-point field-goal percentage	FT%	Free-throw percentage
RPG	Rebounds per game	APG	Assists per game	SPG	Steals per game
BPG	Blocks per game	PPG	Points per game

=== Season ===
Player	GP	GS	MPG	FG%	3P%	FT%	RPG	APG	SPG	BPG	PPG
Matt Barnes^{†}	43	9	16.6	.411	.227	.603	3.1	1.3	0.7	0.2	3.8
Mike Bibby	80	80	38.6	.443	.360	.775	4.2	6.8	1.6	0.4	19.6
Michael Bradley^{≠†}	8	0	6.0	.667		.333	1.4	0.3	0.0	0.0	2.3
Doug Christie^{†}	31	31	32.1	.407	.256	.893	4.0	4.9	1.4	0.4	7.3
Erik Daniels	21	0	3.4	.333	.500		0.9	0.2	0.1	0.0	0.6
Maurice Evans	65	11	19.0	.442	.329	.756	3.1	0.7	0.6	0.1	6.4
Eddie House^{≠}	50	2	11.0	.458	.452	.929	1.2	1.3	0.4	0.1	4.7
Bobby Jackson	25	0	21.4	.427	.344	.862	3.4	2.4	0.6	0.1	12.0
Kevin Martin	45	0	10.1	.385	.200	.655	1.3	0.5	0.4	0.1	2.9
Brad Miller	56	56	37.3	.524	.263	.812	9.3	3.9	1.2	1.2	15.6
Cuttino Mobley^{≠}	43	43	38.7	.440	.424	.831	3.9	3.4	1.2	0.5	17.8
Greg Ostertag	56	3	9.9	.440	.000	.342	3.0	0.7	0.1	0.7	1.6
Brian Skinner^{≠}	25	23	27.8	.554		.377	8.7	1.5	1.0	1.7	7.4
Darius Songaila	81	21	20.6	.527	.000	.847	4.2	1.4	0.6	0.2	7.5
Peja Stojaković	66	66	38.4	.444	.402	.920	4.3	2.1	1.2	0.2	20.1
Kenny Thomas^{≠}	26	15	31.7	.492	.000	.722	8.7	2.9	1.0	0.4	14.5
Chris Webber^{†}	46	46	36.3	.449	.379	.799	9.7	5.5	1.5	0.7	21.3
Corliss Williamson^{≠}	24	4	19.6	.473		.823	3.4	1.5	0.5	0.1	9.3

^{†}Traded during the season
^{≠}Acquired during the season

=== Playoffs ===
Player	GP	GS	MPG	FG%	3P%	FT%	RPG	APG	SPG	BPG	PPG
Mike Bibby	5	5	40.0	.391	.217	.778	4.4	6.6	1.4	0.4	19.6
Maurice Evans	3	0	18.7	.600	.500	.800	2.3	1.0	0.7	0.0	6.0
Eddie House	3	0	7.7	.375	1.000	1.000	0.7	1.3	0.0	0.0	3.0
Bobby Jackson	5	0	15.8	.270	.167	1.000	1.2	1.8	0.2	0.2	5.2
Brad Miller	5	4	27.8	.575	.000	.714	3.8	3.2	0.2	0.6	11.2
Cuttino Mobley	5	5	31.8	.443	.280	.714	2.8	1.8	1.2	0.4	14.8
Greg Ostertag	2	0	13.0	1.000			4.5	0.0	0.5	1.0	3.0
Brian Skinner	4	1	11.8	.500			2.8	0.5	0.5	1.0	2.0
Darius Songaila	5	0	15.0	.421		.800	2.8	0.6	0.4	0.2	4.0
Peja Stojaković	5	5	40.6	.470	.367	.955	5.2	1.4	0.8	0.2	22.0
Kenny Thomas	5	5	30.6	.511		.700	8.8	2.4	0.8	0.4	12.0
Corliss Williamson	5	0	8.0	.375	.000	.778	1.2	0.6	0.2	0.4	5.2

== See also ==
- 2004–05 NBA season
