= 2004–05 Denver Nuggets season =

NBA professional basketball team season

- Head coach: Jeff Bzdelik (games 1-28); Michael Cooper (interim, games 29-42); George Karl (games 43-82)
- Owners: Stan Kroenke
- Arena: Pepsi Center

Results
- Record: 49–33 (.598)
- Place: Division: 2nd (Northwest); Conference: 7th (Western)
- Playoff finish: First Round (lost to Spurs 1–4)
- Stats at Basketball Reference

The 2004–05 Denver Nuggets season was the 29th season for the Denver Nuggets in the National Basketball Association, and their 38th season as a franchise. During the offseason, the Nuggets acquired Kenyon Martin from the New Jersey Nets. Coming off their first playoff appearance in nine years, the Nuggets got off to a shaky start at 13–15. Head coach Jeff Bzdelik was fired after 28 games and was replaced with Michael Cooper as the team lost 10 of their next 14 games. Cooper was then replaced with George Karl, who then led the Nuggets with a 32–8 record for the remainder of the season, including a ten-game winning streak in April. The Nuggets finished second in the Northwest Division with a 49–33 record. Second-year star Carmelo Anthony led them in scoring with 20.8 points per game.

Entering the playoffs as the #7 seed in the Western Conference, the Nuggets won Game 1 over the 2nd-seeded San Antonio Spurs, but would lose the series in five games. The Spurs then defeated the Detroit Pistons in seven games in the NBA Finals, winning their third championship in franchise history.

== Draft picks ==
Round	Pick	Player	Position	Nationality	School/Club team
1	20	Jameer Nelson	PG	United States	St. Joseph's

== Roster ==
2004–05 Denver Nuggets roster
Players

Pos.	No.	Player	Height	Weight	DOB	From
SG	15	Carmelo Anthony	6 ft 8 in (2.03 m)	240 lb (109 kg)		Syracuse
PG	11	Earl Boykins	5 ft 5 in (1.65 m)	133 lb (60 kg)		Eastern Michigan
SG	7	Greg Buckner	6 ft 4 in (1.93 m)	210 lb (95 kg)		Clemson
PF	23	Marcus Camby	6 ft 11 in (2.11 m)	240 lb (109 kg)		UMass
C	56	Francisco Elson	7 ft 0 in (2.13 m)	235 lb (107 kg)		California
PG	12	Luis Flores	6 ft 2 in (1.88 m)	200 lb (91 kg)		Manhattan
SF	3	DerMarr Johnson	6 ft 9 in (2.06 m)	210 lb (95 kg)		Cincinnati
SG	1	Voshon Lenard	6 ft 4 in (1.93 m)	205 lb (93 kg)		Minnesota
SF	6	Kenyon Martin	6 ft 9 in (2.06 m)	225 lb (102 kg)		Cincinnati
PG	24	Andre Miller	6 ft 2 in (1.88 m)	200 lb (91 kg)		Utah
PF	21	Eduardo Nájera	6 ft 8 in (2.03 m)	235 lb (107 kg)		Oklahoma
C	31	Nenê	6 ft 11 in (2.11 m)	260 lb (118 kg)		Brazil
G/F	10	Wesley Person	6 ft 6 in (1.98 m)	195 lb (88 kg)		Auburn
F	41	Mark Pope	6 ft 10 in (2.08 m)	235 lb (107 kg)		Kentucky
G/F	9	Bryon Russell	6 ft 7 in (2.01 m)	225 lb (102 kg)		Long Beach State

Coaches
Head coach
- George Karl (North Carolina)
Assistant(s)
- Scott Brooks (UC Irvine)
- Adrian Dantley (Notre Dame)
- Doug Moe (North Carolina)
- Chip Engelland (assistant/player development)
- Rex Kalamian (assistant/player development)
- Bill Branch (director of scouting)

Legend
- (DP) Unsigned draft pick
- (FA) Free agent
- (S) Suspended
- Injured

Roster

== Regular season ==
=== Season standings ===
Northwest Division	W	L	PCT	GB	Home	Road	Div
y-Seattle SuperSonics	52	30	.634	–	26–15	26–15	11–5
x-Denver Nuggets	49	33	.598	3	31–10	18–23	9–7
e-Minnesota Timberwolves	44	38	.537	8	24–17	20–21	10–6
e-Portland Trail Blazers	27	55	.329	25	18–23	9–32	4–12
e-Utah Jazz	26	56	.317	26	18–23	8–33	6–10

#	Western Conference				
#	Team	W	L	PCT	GB
1	z-Phoenix Suns	62	20	.756	—
2	y-San Antonio Spurs	59	23	.720	3
3	y-Seattle SuperSonics	52	30	.634	10
4	x-Dallas Mavericks	58	24	.707	4
5	x-Houston Rockets	51	31	.622	11
6	x-Sacramento Kings	50	32	.610	12
7	x-Denver Nuggets	49	33	.598	13
8	x-Memphis Grizzlies	45	37	.549	17
9	e-Minnesota Timberwolves	44	38	.537	18
10	e-Los Angeles Clippers	37	45	.451	25
11	e-Los Angeles Lakers	34	48	.415	28
12	e-Golden State Warriors	34	48	.415	28
13	e-Portland Trail Blazers	27	55	.329	35
14	e-Utah Jazz	26	56	.317	36
15	e-New Orleans Hornets	18	64	.220	44

== Playoffs ==
2005 playoff game log
First Round: 1–4 (home: 0–2; road: 1–2)

Game	Date	Team	Score	High points	High rebounds	High assists	Location Attendance	Series
1	April 24	@ San Antonio	W 93–87	Andre Miller (31)	Marcus Camby (12)	Andre Miller (5)	SBC Center; 18,797	1–0
2	April 27	@ San Antonio	L 76–104	DeMarr Johnson (12)	Marcus Camby (12)	Andre Miller (7)	SBC Center; 18,797	1–1
3	April 30	San Antonio	L 78–86	Carmelo Anthony (19)	Marcus Camby (14)	Andre Miller (7)	Pepsi Center; 19,913	1–2
4	May 2	San Antonio	L 115–126 (OT)	Earl Boykins (32)	Marcus Camby (14)	Anthony, Boykins (5)	Pepsi Center; 19,776	1–3
5	May 4	@ San Antonio	L 89–99	Carmelo Anthony (25)	Marcus Camby (10)	Andre Miller (6)	SBC Center; 18,797	1–4

2005 schedule

== Player statistics ==
Legend
GP	Games played	GS	Games started	MPG	Minutes per game
FG%	Field-goal percentage	3P%	3-point field-goal percentage	FT%	Free-throw percentage
RPG	Rebounds per game	APG	Assists per game	SPG	Steals per game
BPG	Blocks per game	PPG	Points per game

=== Regular season ===
Player	GP	GS	MPG	FG%	3FG%	FT%	RPG	APG	SPG	BPG	PPG
Carmelo Anthony	75	75	34.8	.431	.266	.796	5.7	2.6	0.9	0.4	20.8
Kenyon Martin	70	67	32.5	.490	.000	.646	7.3	2.4	1.4	1.1	15.5
Andre Miller	82	82	34.8	.477	.154	.838	4.1	6.9	1.5	0.1	13.6
Earl Boykins	82	5	26.4	.413	.337	.921	1.7	4.5	1.0	0.1	12.4
Marcus Camby	66	66	30.5	.465	.000	.723	10.0	2.3	0.9	3.0	10.3
Voshon Lenard	3	1	18.0	.385	.333	.625	2.0	2.0	0.3	0.0	9.7
Nenê	55	18	23.9	.503	.000	.660	5.9	1.5	0.9	0.9	9.6
Wesley Person	25	0	18.4	.485	.485	.556	2.4	1.1	0.5	0.2	8.1
DerMarr Johnson	71	40	17.4	.499	.358	.792	2.1	1.1	0.6	0.3	7.1
Eduardo Nàjera	26	0	22.1	.500	.000	.630	4.8	1.1	0.9	0.5	6.9
Greg Buckner	70	41	21.7	.528	.405	.778	3.0	1.9	1.1	0.1	6.2
Rodney White	42	2	12.6	.432	.432	.618	1.8	0.9	0.7	0.2	5.6
Bryon Russell	70	2	14.7	.377	.376	.792	2.5	1.0	0.6	0.2	4.4
Francisco Elson	67	11	14.0	.468	.333	.570	3.0	0.5	0.5	0.6	3.7
Luis Flores	1	0	4.0	.500	1.000		1.0	0.0	0.0	0.0	3.0
Nikoloz Tskitishvili	23	0	6.9	.294	.000	.571	1.3	0.2	0.3	0.3	1.5
Mark Pope	9	0	3.0	.333			0.9	0.1	0.1	0.2	0.4

=== Playoffs ===
Player	GP	GS	MPG	FG%	3FG%	FT%	RPG	APG	SPG	BPG	PPG
Carmelo Anthony	5	5	36.0	.422	.000	.813	5.4	2.0	0.6	0.2	19.2
Andre Miller	5	5	36.8	.424	.500	.719	5.2	5.2	2.0	0.2	16.2
Earl Boykins	5	1	30.4	.397	.000	.895	1.0	3.8	0.8	0.2	14.2
Kenyon Martin	5	5	32.8	.466	.000	.615	5.6	1.2	1.0	1.0	12.4
Marcus Camby	5	5	36.8	.415		.630	11.2	1.8	0.6	3.2	10.2
DerMarr Johnson	4	2	19.5	.550	.364	1.000	2.0	0.8	0.5	0.5	7.3
Nenê	5	0	20.2	.429		.652	5.0	0.4	0.4	0.4	6.6
Wesley Person	4	0	13.5	.429	.375		0.3	0.3	0.3	0.0	3.8
Greg Buckner	5	2	20.0	.222	.222		3.2	1.0	0.4	0.2	2.0
Bryon Russell	3	0	3.0	.000	.000	1.000	0.0	0.0	0.0	0.0	1.0
Eduardo Nàjera	2	0	6.5	.000			1.0	0.5	0.0	0.0	0.0
Francisco Elson	1	0	6.0	.000			3.0	0.0	0.0	0.0	0.0

Player statistics citation:

== Awards and records ==
- Marcus Camby, NBA All-Defensive Second Team
