= 2004–05 Los Angeles Clippers season =

NBA professional basketball team season

- Head coach: Mike Dunleavy, Sr.
- Arena: Staples Center

Results
- Record: 37–45 (.451)
- Place: Division: 3rd (Pacific); Conference: 10th (Western)
- Playoff finish: Did not qualify
- Stats at Basketball Reference

Local media
- Television: FSN West 2, KTLA
- Radio: KSPN

The 2004–05 Los Angeles Clippers season was the Clippers' 35th season in the National Basketball Association, and their 21st season in Los Angeles. With a young team with some promising talent led by Elton Brand and Corey Maggette, the Clippers got off to a solid start with an 11–7 record, but then lost five straight as they played around .500 for the first half of the season. However, after holding a 23–23 record as of February 3, the team struggled and lost eight straight games, losing nine of their twelve games during the month. The Clippers continued to struggled as they finished third in the Pacific Division with a 37–45 record, which was three more wins than their crosstown rival, the Los Angeles Lakers. However, the Clippers missed the playoffs for eight straight seasons. Bobby Simmons was named Most Improved Player of The Year averaging 16.4 points per game. Following the season, he left to sign as a free agent with the Milwaukee Bucks.

== Draft picks ==
Round	Pick	Player	Position	Nationality	College
1	4	Shaun Livingston	PG	United States	Peoria HS
2	34	Lionel Chalmers	PG	United States	Xavier

The Clippers entered the draft with one first-round selection and one second-round selection, both acquired from the Charlotte Bobcats few days prior in exchange for their original first-round pick. They had also traded their original second-round selection to the Seattle SuperSonics in 2003.

== Roster ==
Los Angeles Clippers roster
Players

Pos.	No.	Player	Height	Weight	DOB	From
PF	42	Elton Brand	6 ft 8 in (2.03 m)	254 lb (115 kg)		Duke
PG	9	Rick Brunson	6 ft 4 in (1.93 m)	190 lb (86 kg)		Temple
PG	0	Lionel Chalmers	6 ft 0 in (1.83 m)	180 lb (82 kg)		Xavier
SG	20	Marko Jaric	6 ft 7 in (2.01 m)	217 lb (98 kg)		Serbia & Montenegro
C	35	Chris Kaman	7 ft 0 in (2.13 m)	265 lb (120 kg)		Central Michigan
SG	30	Kerry Kittles	6 ft 5 in (1.96 m)	185 lb (84 kg)		Villanova
PG	14	Shaun Livingston	6 ft 7 in (2.01 m)	182 lb (83 kg)		Peoria Central HS (IL)
SF	50	Corey Maggette	6 ft 6 in (1.98 m)	225 lb (102 kg)		Duke
F/C	33	Mikki Moore	7 ft 0 in (2.13 m)	223 lb (101 kg)		Nebraska
C	34	Mamadou N'Diaye	6 ft 7 in (2.01 m)	182 lb (83 kg)		Auburn
C	11	Zeljko Rebraca	7 ft 0 in (2.13 m)	265 lb (120 kg)		Serbia & Montenegro
SG	13	Quinton Ross	6 ft 6 in (1.98 m)	193 lb (88 kg)		SMU
SF	21	Bobby Simmons	6 ft 6 in (1.98 m)	228 lb (103 kg)		DePaul
PF	54	Chris Wilcox	6 ft 10 in (2.08 m)	235 lb (107 kg)		Maryland

Coaches
Head coach
- Mike Dunleavy (South Carolina)
Assistant(s)
- Jim Eyen (UC Santa Barbara)
- Kim Hughes (Wisconsin)
- Neal Meyer (San Diego)
- Rory White (South Alabama)

Legend
- (DP) Unsigned draft pick
- (FA) Free agent
- (S) Suspended
- Injured

Roster
Updated: 2008-03-12

=== Roster Notes ===
- This was Darrick Martin's second tour of duty with the franchise. He previously played for the team from 1996 to 1999. The Clippers released him after the second of his two ten-day contracts expired on January 25, 2005.

== Regular season ==
=== Season standings ===
Pacific Division	W	L	PCT	GB	Home	Road	Div
y-Phoenix Suns	62	20	.756	–	31–10	31–10	12–4
x-Sacramento Kings	50	32	.610	12	30–11	20–21	10–6
e-Los Angeles Clippers	37	45	.451	25	27–14	10–31	6–10
e-Los Angeles Lakers	34	48	.415	28	22–19	12–29	6–10
e-Golden State Warriors	34	48	.415	28	20–21	14–27	6–10

#	Western Conference				
#	Team	W	L	PCT	GB
1	z-Phoenix Suns	62	20	.756	—
2	y-San Antonio Spurs	59	23	.720	3
3	y-Seattle SuperSonics	52	30	.634	10
4	x-Dallas Mavericks	58	24	.707	4
5	x-Houston Rockets	51	31	.622	11
6	x-Sacramento Kings	50	32	.610	12
7	x-Denver Nuggets	49	33	.598	13
8	x-Memphis Grizzlies	45	37	.549	17
9	e-Minnesota Timberwolves	44	38	.537	18
10	e-Los Angeles Clippers	37	45	.451	25
11	e-Los Angeles Lakers	34	48	.415	28
12	e-Golden State Warriors	34	48	.415	28
13	e-Portland Trail Blazers	27	55	.329	35
14	e-Utah Jazz	26	56	.317	36
15	e-New Orleans Hornets	18	64	.220	44

== Player statistics ==
Legend
GP	Games played	GS	Games started	MPG	Minutes per game
FG%	Field-goal percentage	3P%	3-point field-goal percentage	FT%	Free-throw percentage
RPG	Rebounds per game	APG	Assists per game	SPG	Steals per game
BPG	Blocks per game	PPG	Points per game

Player	GP	GS	MPG	FG%	3P%	FT%	RPG	APG	SPG	BPG	PPG
Corey Maggette	66	60	36.9	43.1	30.4	85.7	6.0	3.4	1.1	0.1	22.2
Elton Brand	81	81	37.0	50.3	0.0	75.2	9.5	2.6	0.8	2.1	20.0
Bobby Simmons	75	74	37.3	46.6	43.5	84.6	5.9	2.7	1.4	0.2	16.4
Marko Jaric	50	41	33.1	41.4	37.1	72.0	3.2	6.1	1.7	0.3	9.9
Chris Kaman	63	50	25.9	49.7	0.0	66.1	6.7	1.2	0.4	1.1	9.1
Chris Wilcox	54	25	18.6	51.4	0.0	61.1	4.2	0.7	0.5	0.4	7.9
Shaun Livingston	30	15	27.1	41.4	0.0	74.6	3.0	5.0	1.1	0.4	7.4
Kerry Kittles	11	0	22.1	38.4	33.3	60.0	2.9	1.8	0.7	0.3	6.3
Zeljko Rebraca	58	2	16.0	56.8	0.0	85.9	3.2	0.4	0.2	0.7	5.8
Rick Brunson	80	39	24.3	37.6	36.9	77.0	2.3	5.1	1.0	0.1	5.5
Mikki Moore	74	4	15.9	50.2	20.0	78.7	3.3	0.6	0.3	0.4	5.4
Quinton Ross	78	19	21.3	43.2	25.0	67.3	2.7	1.4	0.7	0.3	5.1
Darrick Martin	11	0	17.3	32.0	27.8	62.5	0.9	2.5	0.5	0.0	3.8
Lionel Chalmers	36	0	12.0	33.6	24.5	62.5	0.9	1.4	0.4	0.0	3.1
Kenny Anderson	4	0	6.5	36.4	0.0	0.0	1.3	1.3	0.0	0.0	2.0
Mamdou N'Diaye	11	0	6.5	40.0	0.0	57.1	1.6	0.1	0.1	0.5	1.8
Kirk Penney	4	0	3.0	33.3	0.0	0.0	0.3	0.3	0.0	0.0	0.5
Maurice Baker	1	0	1.0	0.0	0.0	0.0	0.0	0.0	0.0	0.0	0.0

Player statistics citation:

== Awards and records ==
- Bobby Simmons, NBA Most Improved Player Award

== Transactions ==
The Clippers were involved in the following transactions during the 2004–05 season.

=== Trades ===
June 22, 2004
To Los Angeles Clippers

- 2004 first-round draft pick (4th pick) and 2004 second-round draft pick
To Charlotte Bobcats

- 2004 first-round draft pick (2nd pick) and agreement to select Predrag Drobnjak in expansion draft.
July 14, 2004
To Los Angeles Clippers

- 2005 2nd-round draft pick & 2006 2nd-round draft pick
To Charlotte Bobcats

- Melvin Ely and Eddie House
July 29, 2004
To Los Angeles Clippers

- Kerry Kittles
To New Jersey Nets

- 2005 second-round draft pick

=== Free agents ===
==== Additions ====
Player	Signed	Former team
Rick Brunson	August 12	Chicago Bulls
Zeljko Rebraca	August 12	Atlanta Hawks
Mamadou N'Diaye	August 16	Atlanta Hawks
Quinton Ross	August 16	Telindus Oostende (BLB)
Mikki Moore	August 20	Utah Jazz
Kirk Penney	December 26	Asheville Altitude (NBDL)
Darrick Martin	January 5	Minnesota Timberwolves
Maurice Baker	February 22	Dakota Wizards (NBDL)
Kenny Anderson	February 28	Atlanta Hawks

==== Subtractions ====
Player	Left	New team
Doug Overton	free agency, June 1	Philadelphia 76ers (director of player development)
Predrag Drobnjak	expansion draft, June 22	Charlotte Bobcats
Keyon Dooling	free agency, July 22	Miami Heat
Quentin Richardson	free agency, July 29	Phoenix Suns
Matt Barnes	free agency, October 1	Sacramento Kings
Josh Moore	released, October 1	BEEM Mazandaran (Iranian Basketball Super League)
Kirk Penney	waived, January 3	Maccabi Tel Aviv (Ligat HaAI)
Maurice Baker	contract expired, March 4	Portland Trail Blazers
Kenny Anderson	waived, March 25	Žalgiris Kaunas (LKL)

== See also ==
- 2004–05 NBA season
