= Mamadou N'Diaye (basketball, born 1975) =

Senegalese player and coach

Personal information
- Born: June 16, 1975 (age 51) Dakar, Senegal
- Listed height: 7 ft 0 in (2.13 m)
- Listed weight: 255 lb (116 kg)

Career information
- High school: Maine Central Institute (Pittsfield, Maine)
- College: Auburn (1996–2000)
- NBA draft: 2000: 1st round, 26th overall pick
- Drafted by: Denver Nuggets
- Playing career: 2000–2010
- Position: Center
- Number: 32, 34
- Coaching career: 2011–present

Career history

Playing
- 2001–2003: Toronto Raptors
- 2003–2004: Asheville Altitude
- 2004: Dallas Mavericks
- 2004: Atlanta Hawks
- 2004–2005: Los Angeles Clippers
- 2005–2006: P.A.O.K.
- 2006–2009: Panellinios
- 2008: →Žalgiris Kaunas
- 2009: Hong Kong Canton Liberty
- 2010: Maccabi Haifa

Coaching
- 2011–2013: Coastal Carolina (assistant)
- 2014–2016: Georgia Tech (assistant)
- 2019–2021: San Francisco (assistant)
- 2021–2025: UCF (assistant)
- 2025–2026: Cincinnati (assistant)

Career NBA statistics
- Points: 262 (3.8 ppg)
- Rebounds: 225 (3.3 rpg)
- Blocks: 64 (0.9 apg)
- Stats at NBA.com
- Stats at Basketball Reference

Mamadou N'Diaye (/ˈmɑːməduː ˈɛndʒaɪ/ MAH-mə-doo EN-jy; born June 16, 1975) is a Senegalese former professional basketball player, who was most recently an assistant coach for the Cincinnati Bearcats. Prior to this, he was an assistant coach for UCF Knights men's basketball.

After a college career at Auburn University, in the United States, N'Diaye was drafted by the Denver Nuggets in the first round of the 2000 NBA draft. He played for the Toronto Raptors, Dallas Mavericks, Atlanta Hawks, Los Angeles Clippers in the NBA. He last played for Maccabi Haifa in Israel.

== Early years ==
As an assistant basketball coach at the University of Maine, Mike LaPlante served as a consultant with the Senegalese Basketball Federation. N'Diaye was part of the federation's development program and had a desire to continue his studies and improve his basketball skills in the United States. Mamadou matriculated to a prep school in Pittsfield, Maine (Maine Central Institute) and excelled playing for Max Good.

== College career ==
N'Diaye got off to a slow start at Auburn but improved every year. In his junior year, he broke Charles Barkley's career record for blocks. His long reach and athleticism made him the anchor of Auburn University's defense for much of his time there.

His averages per game during his senior season there were 26.3 minutes, 8.9 points, 8 rebounds, 1.8 blocks, 2.2 turnovers, and 3.1 fouls. He made 2.9 of 5.5 field goals (53%) and 3.1 of 4.6 free throws (67%) that senior year. He finished his college career with averages of 21.7 minutes, 6.8 points on 50.7% shooting and 64.1% free throws, 6.2 rebounds, 1.9 turnovers and 1.9 blocks per game. He left Auburn with the record for the most number of blocked shots.

== NBA career ==
N'Diaye was the 26th first-round selection by the Denver Nuggets in the 2000 NBA draft. He was one of the oldest players ever selected in the NBA draft at 25 years of age. In January 2001, N'Diaye was traded with Keon Clark and Tracy Murray to the Toronto Raptors in exchange for Kevin Willis, Aleksandar Radojević, Garth Joseph, a second round draft pick and a $564,603 trade exception.

N'Diaye appeared in his first NBA game during the 2000-01 season with the Raptors. He played in Toronto through the 2002-03 season. His tenure in Toronto coincided with that of the tail-end of veteran All-Star Hakeem Olajuwon's. Mamadou admits, "practicing against Hakeem helped me tremendously."

He signed with the Dallas Mavericks in January 2004 but was released later that month. He signed with the Atlanta Hawks in February 2004 but was assigned to the Asheville Altitude of the NBDL. In March 2004, he was released by the Hawks and returned to the Altitude. He also signed again with the Hawks later that month.

N'Diaye signed with the Los Angeles Clippers in August 2004 but was waived in June 2005. In 11 games with the Clippers, he averaged 1.8 points and 1.6 rebounds in 6.5 minutes per contest.

In October 2005, he joined the Golden State Warriors, wearing number 32, but was waived later that month. He signed with PAOK BC later that season.

He played in 69 games in the NBA, averaging 3.8 points on .427 shooting and .736 free throws with 3.3 rebounds, 2.1 fouls and 0.9 blocks in 12.4 minutes. His final NBA game was played on April 20, 2005, in a 86–75 victory over the New Orleans Hornets. N'Diaye played for 5 minutes and the only stat he recorded was 1 block.

== Coaching career ==
In 2011, he joined Coastal Carolina University as an assistant coach. On April 18, 2014, N'Diaye became an assistant coach for Georgia Tech. In 2019, N’Diaye became an associate coach at the University of San Francisco.

In June 2021, N'Diaye became assistant coach for UCF Knights men's basketball.

== Career statistics ==
Legend
GP	Games played	GS	Games started	MPG	Minutes per game
FG%	Field goal percentage	3P%	3-point field goal percentage	FT%	Free throw percentage
RPG	Rebounds per game	APG	Assists per game	SPG	Steals per game
BPG	Blocks per game	PPG	Points per game	**Bold**	Career high

=== NBA ===
==== Regular season ====
Year	Team	GP	GS	MPG	FG%	3P%	FT%	RPG	APG	SPG	BPG	PPG
2000–01	Toronto	3	0	3.3	.250	–	**1.000**	.7	.0	.0	.0	1.3
2001–02	Toronto	5	0	9.2	**.600**	–	.800	2.2	.0	.0	.4	4.0
2002–03	Toronto	22	**8**	**16.5**	.448	–	.723	3.7	**.3**	**.4**	**1.5**	**5.5**
2003–04	Dallas	3	0	2.3	–	–	–	.3	.0	.0	.3	.0
2003–04	Atlanta	**25**	1	14.4	.397	–	.746	**4.4**	.0	.3	1.0	3.9
2004–05	L.A. Clippers	11	0	6.5	.400	.000	.571	1.6	.1	.1	.5	1.8
Career		69	9	12.4	.427	.000	.736	3.3	.1	.2	.9	3.8

=== Euroleague ===
Year	Team	GP	GS	MPG	FG%	3P%	FT%	RPG	APG	SPG	BPG	PPG
2007–08	Žalgiris	6	0	25.5	.487	.000	.565	7.0	.7	1.2	1.0	8.5

=== College ===
Year	Team	GP	GS	MPG	FG%	3P%	FT%	RPG	APG	SPG	BPG	PPG
1996–97	Auburn	31	11	11.3	.488	.000	.526	2.5	.2	.4	.8	3.0
1997–98	Auburn	30	30	24.9	.503	–	.616	6.9	.7	.5	**2.4**	8.0
1998-99	Auburn	33	**33**	23.8	.489	.000	.649	7.5	**.9**	**1.0**	2.3	7.2
1999-2000	Auburn	**34**	**33**	**26.6**	**.535**	–	**.665**	**7.9**	.5	.8	1.9	**8.9**
Career		128	107	21.8	.506	.000	.641	6.2	.6	.7	1.9	6.8
