= DerMarr Johnson =

American basketball player (born 1980)

Tennessee State Tigers
- Title: Assistant coach
- League: Ohio Valley Conference

Personal information
- Born: May 5, 1980 (age 46) Washington, D.C., U.S.
- Listed height: 6 ft 9 in (2.06 m)
- Listed weight: 201 lb (91 kg)

Career information
- High school: Maine Central Institute (Pittsfield, Maine)
- College: Cincinnati (1999–2000)
- NBA draft: 2000: 1st round, 6th overall pick
- Drafted by: Atlanta Hawks
- Playing career: 2000–2015
- Position: Shooting guard / small forward
- Number: 1, 4, 3, 8
- Coaching career: 2021–present

Career history

Playing
- 2000–2003: Atlanta Hawks
- 2003: Long Beach Jam
- 2004: New York Knicks
- 2004–2007: Denver Nuggets
- 2007: Benetton Treviso
- 2007: Austin Toros
- 2007–2008: San Antonio Spurs
- 2009–2010: Jiangsu Dragons
- 2010: Leones de Ponce
- 2010–2011: Sagesse Club Beirut
- 2011: Bukaros
- 2012: Barako Bull Energy
- 2012: Osos de Guadalajara
- 2013: Libertad Sunchales
- 2013–2014: Guaros de Lara
- 2014: Fuerza Regia
- 2015: Indios de San Francisco de Macorís

Career highlights
- As player: Conference USA Freshman of the Year (2000); Third-team All-Conference USA (2000); McDonald's All-American (1999); 2× First-team Parade All-American (1998, 1999)
- Stats at NBA.com
- Stats at Basketball Reference

DerMarr Miles Johnson (born May 5, 1980) is an American former professional basketball player and current assistant coach for the Tennessee State Tigers of the Ohio Valley Conference (OVC) who played seven seasons in the National Basketball Association (NBA).

== College career ==
Johnson was a consensus McDonald's, Parade Magazine and USA Today high school All-American as well as Parade's National High School Player of the Year as a senior in 1999. Johnson chose to the University of Cincinnati and would play for coach Bob Huggins alongside Steven Logan and future NBA players Kenyon Martin and Kenny Satterfield. The 1999–2000 Cincinnati Bearcats men's basketball team were one of the nation's most talented teams, spending the majority of the season ranked No. 1 before Kenyon Martin injured his knee in the conference tournament and cut short what could have been a deep March Madness run by the Bearcats. Johnson was a one and done and declared for the NBA draft after his lone season at Cincinnati.

== Professional career ==
Johnson was selected sixth overall by the Atlanta Hawks in the 2000 NBA draft. His debut game was played on October 31, 2000, in an 82 - 106 loss to the New Orleans Hornets where he played for a little under 6 minutes and only recorded 1 steal, 1 turnover and 3 fouls.

In two seasons with the Hawks, he averaged 6.7 points and 2.8 rebounds per game. On September 13, 2002, Johnson's car crashed into a tree and caught fire. It was not known who was driving; Johnson was one of three occupants and cracked four vertebrae in his neck, nearly causing paralysis. Fitted to a halo brace during his recovery, Johnson was sidelined for the entire 2002-03 NBA season, and questions surfaced regarding him ever playing again. He returned to the league in October 2003 when he signed with the Phoenix Suns only to be waived two weeks later without ever having played a game for them. He then moved on to the American Basketball Association's Long Beach Jam where he played 19 games, before rejoining the NBA, signing a contract with the New York Knicks. The following season, in 2004–05, Johnson rejuvenated his career with the Denver Nuggets, playing in 71 games and averaging 7.1 points on 49.9 percent field goal shooting. During the 2005–06 and 2006–07 seasons, Johnson averaged 5 points on 40 percent shooting in 97 games.

Johnson reportedly signed with Italian team Benetton Treviso in August 2007, but quickly jumped back to the NBA Development League's San Antonio affiliate Austin Toros. Johnson averaged 15.8 points and 6 rebounds in 10 games with the Toros. On December 29 he signed with the San Antonio Spurs after they waived rarely used rookie combo guard Marcus Williams. But on January 7, 2008, Johnson was released from San Antonio Spurs. He was again re-signed by the Spurs, in April. In total, Johnson only played 5 games with the Spurs.

Johnson's final NBA game was played on April 13, 2008, in an 85–106 loss to the Los Angeles Lakers. In his final game, he recorded 3 points, 1 rebound, 1 assist and 1 steal.

=== Post NBA ===
In October 2010 Johnson signed with Hekmeh in Lebanon. Johnson then signed with the Colombian League team Bukaros in September 2011. In 2012, he played for Barako Bull Energy in the Philippines. He also played for the Osos de Guadalajara in the Mexican Liga Nacional de Baloncesto Profesional (LNBP), where he averaged 26.7 points and 6.3 rebounds per game. He then played in Argentina and Venezuela.

Johnson competed for Team City of Gods in The Basketball Tournament. He was a forward on the 2015 team which made it to the semifinals, losing to Overseas Elite 84–71.

== Coaching career ==
On January 25, 2017, the University of Cincinnati hired Johnson as a student assistant coach for the men's basketball team while Johnson completed his unfinished degree, which he did in 2019.

In May 2021, Johnson returned to his alma mater to be director of player development for the men's basketball program under coach Wes Miller.

Midway through the 2022–23 season on January 16, 2023, Johnson was announced as an assistant coach under his former college coach Bob Huggins at West Virginia.

Johnson stayed on at WVU as an assistant after the firing of Bob Huggins. His contract was not renewed after the 2023–2024.

== Arrests and Off Court Issues ==
In 2007, DerMarr Johnson was charged with resisting arrest and interfering with police during a disturbance outside a Denver nightclub. Police said they used a taser to calm the 6-foot-9 player.

In 2008 Johnson was also arrested for DUI in San Antonio. He was pulled over for going 85 MPH in a posted 65 MPH zone. Police smelled alcohol and Johnson admitted to drinking "a few cups" of wine.

Johnson was also seen frequently in Morgantown enjoying Nightlife. Speculation about his commitment to coaching and widely known presence in the bars of Morgantown, may have led to his contract not being renewed by WVU.

Some argue that due to his 2002 wreck as well, that Johnson is one of the biggest busts in NBA History.

== NBA career statistics ==
Legend
GP	Games played	GS	Games started	MPG	Minutes per game
FG%	Field goal percentage	3P%	3-point field goal percentage	FT%	Free throw percentage
RPG	Rebounds per game	APG	Assists per game	SPG	Steals per game
BPG	Blocks per game	PPG	Points per game	**Bold**	Career high

=== Regular season ===
Year	Team	GP	GS	MPG	FG%	3P%	FT%	RPG	APG	SPG	BPG	PPG
2000–01	Atlanta	**78**	21	16.8	.374	.323	.736	2.3	.8	.6	.4	5.1
2001–02	Atlanta	72	**46**	**24.0**	.396	.360	.810	**3.4**	**1.1**	**.9**	**.8**	**8.4**
2003–04	New York	21	1	13.7	.371	**.361**	**.903**	1.9	.5	.4	.3	5.4
2004–05	Denver	71	40	17.4	.499	.358	.792	2.1	**1.1**	.6	.3	7.1
2005–06	Denver	58	21	15.9	.431	.350	.810	1.7	.9	.4	.4	6.1
2006–07	Denver	39	7	10.7	.325	.216	.762	1.5	.4	.4	.3	3.5
2007–08	San Antonio	5	0	5.6	**.500**	.333	.000	.2	.2	.2	.0	3.4
Career		344	136	17.2	.411	.336	.789	2.2	.9	.6	.4	6.2

=== Playoffs ===
Year	Team	GP	GS	MPG	FG%	3P%	FT%	RPG	APG	SPG	BPG	PPG
2004	New York	3	0	5.7	.000	.000	.000	.7	.7	.0	.3	.0
2005	Denver	**4**	**2**	**19.5**	**.550**	**.364**	**1.000**	2.0	**.8**	**.5**	**.5**	**7.3**
2006	Denver	3	0	11.3	.231	.100	.000	**3.3**	.7	.0	.3	2.3
Career		10	2	12.9	.368	.208	1.000	2.0	.7	.2	.4	3.6
