= 2004–05 Utah Jazz season =

NBA professional basketball team season

- Head coach: Jerry Sloan
- Arena: Delta Center

Results
- Record: 26–56 (.317)
- Place: Division: 5th Conference: 14th
- Playoff finish: Did not qualify
- Stats at Basketball Reference

Local media
- Television: KJZZ-TV; FSN Utah
- Radio: KFNZ/KBEE

The 2004–05 Utah Jazz season was the Jazz's 31st season in the National Basketball Association (NBA) and 26th in Salt Lake City, Utah. During the offseason, the Jazz signed free agents Carlos Boozer and Mehmet Okur. The Jazz got off to a strong start winning six of their first seven games, but would struggle later on, losing 12 of their 15 games in December. Their struggles continued as they lost nine straight games in March. The Jazz finished last place in the Northwest Division with a 26–56 record, and failed to qualify for the playoffs for the second straight season. It broke a record sequence of nineteen consecutive winning seasons by the Jazz, a feat which in major professional sports leagues of North America has been bettered only by the NFL's Dallas Cowboys between 1966 and 1985, by the NHL's Detroit Red Wings since 1990–91 and by the American League's New York Yankees between 1926 and 1964. In fact, it was the Jazz’ first losing season since 1982–83, which would place them second only to the mid-century Yankees.

For the season, the Jazz changed their logo and uniforms, adding dark blue to their color scheme. Both the logo and uniforms lasted until 2010.

== Draft picks ==
| Round | Pick | Player | Position | Nationality | College |
|---|---|---|---|---|---|
| 1 | 14 | Kris Humphries | PF | United States | Minnesota |
| 1 | 16 | Kirk Snyder | SG | United States | Nevada |
| 1 | 21 | Pavel Podkolzin | C | Russia | |

== Roster ==
Utah Jazz roster
Players

| Pos. | No. | Player | Height | Weight | DOB | From |
|---|---|---|---|---|---|---|
| SG | 19 | Raja Bell | 6 ft 5 in (1.96 m) | 204 lb (93 kg) | | FIU |
| PF | 5 | Carlos Boozer | 6 ft 9 in (2.06 m) | 258 lb (117 kg) | | Duke |
| C | 22 | Curtis Borchardt | 7 ft 0 in (2.13 m) | 240 lb (109 kg) | | Stanford |
| PF | 31 | Jarron Collins | 6 ft 11 in (2.11 m) | 248 lb (112 kg) | | Stanford |
| PG | 6 | Howard Eisley | 6 ft 2 in (1.88 m) | 177 lb (80 kg) | | Boston College |
| SG | 10 | Gordan Giriček | 6 ft 7 in (2.01 m) | 225 lb (102 kg) | | Croatia |
| C | 44 | Ben Handlogten | 6 ft 10 in (2.08 m) | 240 lb (109 kg) | | Western Michigan |
| SF | 15 | Matt Harpring | 6 ft 7 in (2.01 m) | 230 lb (104 kg) | | Georgia Tech |
| PF | 43 | Kris Humphries | 6 ft 9 in (2.06 m) | 235 lb (107 kg) | | Minnesota |
| PF | 47 | Andrei Kirilenko | 6 ft 9 in (2.06 m) | 235 lb (107 kg) | | Russia |
| PG | 2 | Randy Livingston | 6 ft 4 in (1.93 m) | 209 lb (95 kg) | | LSU |
| PG | 24 | Raül López | 6 ft 1 in (1.85 m) | 170 lb (77 kg) | | Spain |
| PG | 25 | Keith McLeod | 6 ft 2 in (1.88 m) | 190 lb (86 kg) | | Bowling Green |
| C | 13 | Mehmet Okur | 6 ft 11 in (2.11 m) | 290 lb (132 kg) | | Turkey |
| SG | 3 | Kirk Snyder | 6 ft 6 in (1.98 m) | 225 lb (102 kg) | | Nevada |

Coaches
Head coach
- Jerry Sloan (Evansville)
Assistant(s)
- Gordon Chiesa
- Tyrone Corbin (DePaul)
- Phil Johnson
- Mark McKown (player development)
- Gary Briggs (athletic trainer)

Legend
- (DP) Unsigned draft pick
- (FA) Free agent
- (S) Suspended
- Injured

Roster

== Regular season ==
=== Season standings ===
| Northwest Division | W | L | PCT | GB | Home | Road | Div |
|---|---|---|---|---|---|---|---|
| y-Seattle SuperSonics | 52 | 30 | .634 | – | 26–15 | 26–15 | 11–5 |
| x-Denver Nuggets | 49 | 33 | .598 | 3 | 31–10 | 18–23 | 9–7 |
| e-Minnesota Timberwolves | 44 | 38 | .537 | 8 | 24–17 | 20–21 | 10–6 |
| e-Portland Trail Blazers | 27 | 55 | .329 | 25 | 18–23 | 9–32 | 4–12 |
| e-Utah Jazz | 26 | 56 | .317 | 26 | 18–23 | 8–33 | 6–10 |

| # | Western Conference | | | | |
| # | Team | W | L | PCT | GB |
|---|---|---|---|---|---|
| 1 | z-Phoenix Suns | 62 | 20 | .756 | — |
| 2 | y-San Antonio Spurs | 59 | 23 | .720 | 3 |
| 3 | y-Seattle SuperSonics | 52 | 30 | .634 | 10 |
| 4 | x-Dallas Mavericks | 58 | 24 | .707 | 4 |
| 5 | x-Houston Rockets | 51 | 31 | .622 | 11 |
| 6 | x-Sacramento Kings | 50 | 32 | .610 | 12 |
| 7 | x-Denver Nuggets | 49 | 33 | .598 | 13 |
| 8 | x-Memphis Grizzlies | 45 | 37 | .549 | 17 |
| 9 | e-Minnesota Timberwolves | 44 | 38 | .537 | 18 |
| 10 | e-Los Angeles Clippers | 37 | 45 | .451 | 25 |
| 11 | e-Los Angeles Lakers | 34 | 48 | .415 | 28 |
| 12 | e-Golden State Warriors | 34 | 48 | .415 | 28 |
| 13 | e-Portland Trail Blazers | 27 | 55 | .329 | 35 |
| 14 | e-Utah Jazz | 26 | 56 | .317 | 36 |
| 15 | e-New Orleans Hornets | 18 | 64 | .220 | 44 |

== Player statistics ==
Legend
| GP | Games played | GS | Games started | MPG | Minutes per game |
| FG% | Field-goal percentage | 3P% | 3-point field-goal percentage | FT% | Free-throw percentage |
| RPG | Rebounds per game | APG | Assists per game | SPG | Steals per game |
| BPG | Blocks per game | PPG | Points per game |

=== Regular season ===
| Player | GP | GS | MPG | FG% | 3P% | FT% | RPG | APG | SPG | BPG | PPG |
|---|---|---|---|---|---|---|---|---|---|---|---|
| Carlos Arroyo^{†} | 30 | 16 | 24.7 | .401 | .389 | .841 | 1.5 | 5.1 | .7 | .1 | 8.2 |
| Raja Bell | 63 | 32 | 28.4 | .454 | .403 | .747 | 3.2 | 1.4 | .7 | .1 | 12.3 |
| Carlos Boozer | 51 | 51 | 34.7 | .521 | .000 | .698 | 9.0 | 2.8 | .8 | .5 | 17.8 |
| Curtis Borchardt | 67 | 23 | 12.8 | .430 | | .732 | 3.3 | .7 | .1 | .5 | 3.0 |
| Jarron Collins | 50 | 38 | 19.2 | .414 | .000 | .697 | 3.3 | 1.2 | .2 | .1 | 4.3 |
| Howard Eisley | 74 | 1 | 19.3 | .398 | .262 | .795 | 1.2 | 3.4 | .6 | .1 | 5.6 |
| Gordan Giriček | 81 | 44 | 20.5 | .448 | .362 | .810 | 2.2 | 1.7 | .6 | .1 | 8.8 |
| Ben Handlogten | 21 | 5 | 14.1 | .518 | .000 | .529 | 3.1 | .6 | .3 | .2 | 4.5 |
| Matt Harpring | 78 | 55 | 33.1 | .489 | .209 | .778 | 6.2 | 1.8 | .9 | .2 | 14.0 |
| Kris Humphries | 67 | 4 | 13.0 | .404 | .333 | .436 | 2.9 | .6 | .4 | .3 | 4.1 |
| Andrei Kirilenko | 41 | 37 | 32.9 | .493 | .299 | .784 | 6.2 | 3.2 | 1.6 | 3.3 | 15.6 |
| Randy Livingston | 17 | 4 | 13.4 | .423 | .625 | .882 | .7 | 2.6 | .7 | .1 | 3.8 |
| Raül López | 31 | 15 | 16.7 | .422 | .444 | .818 | 1.3 | 4.0 | .7 | .1 | 5.2 |
| Keith McLeod | 53 | 47 | 26.1 | .350 | .250 | .767 | 2.1 | 4.5 | 1.2 | .2 | 7.8 |
| Mehmet Okur | 82 | 25 | 28.1 | .468 | .270 | .850 | 7.5 | 2.0 | .4 | .8 | 12.9 |
| Aleksandar Radojević | 12 | 6 | 10.7 | .316 | | .700 | 2.3 | .5 | .0 | .2 | 1.6 |
| Kirk Snyder | 68 | 7 | 13.3 | .372 | .353 | .667 | 1.8 | .5 | .4 | .3 | 5.0 |

- ^{†} Denotes player spent time with another team in the season. Stats reflect time with the Jazz only.

== Awards and records ==
- Andrei Kirilenko, NBA All-Defensive Second Team
