= 2004–05 Portland Trail Blazers season =

NBA professional basketball team season

- Head coach: Maurice Cheeks (fired); Kevin Pritchard (interim)
- General manager: John Nash
- Owner: Paul Allen
- Arena: Rose Garden Arena

Results
- Record: 27–55 (.329)
- Place: Division: 4th (Northwest); Conference: 13th (Western)
- Playoff finish: Did not qualify
- Stats at Basketball Reference

Local media
- Television: KGW; FSN Northwest
- Radio: KXL

The 2004–05 Portland Trail Blazers season was the 35th season for the Portland Trail Blazers in the National Basketball Association. During the offseason, the Blazers acquired Nick Van Exel from the Golden State Warriors and signed free agent Joel Przybilla. The Blazers played around .500 for the first two months, but started to struggle losing 11 of their 15 games in January. Head coach Maurice Cheeks was fired midway through the season with a record of 22–33. He was replaced by general manager Kevin Pritchard, who acted as interim coach for the remainder of the season, in which the team went 5–22. For the second year in a row, the Blazers did not qualify for the playoffs. The team's overall record of 27–55 was their worst since 1973–74, their fourth season of existence.

Following the season, Pritchard was fired as coach, Van Exel signed as a free agent with the San Antonio Spurs, Shareef Abdur-Rahim was traded to the New Jersey Nets, but failed his physical and later on signed with the Sacramento Kings, Damon Stoudamire signed with the Memphis Grizzlies, and Derek Anderson signed with the Houston Rockets.

For the season, they slightly once again changed their primary logo added Trail on their wordmark of the Blazers' primary logo they remained until 2017.

== Draft picks ==
Round	Pick	Player	Position	Nationality	College / Club Team
1	13	Sebastian Telfair	G	United States	
1	23	Sergei Monia	G	Russia	CSKA Moscow (Russia)
2	47	Ha Seung-Jin	C	South Korea	Yonsei University (South Korea)

== Roster ==
Portland Trail Blazers roster
Players

Pos.	No.	Player	Height	Weight	DOB	From
F	33	Shareef Abdur-Rahim	6 ft 9 in (2.06 m)	225 lb (102 kg)		California
G/F	1	Derek Anderson (injured)	6 ft 5 in (1.96 m)	194 lb (88 kg)		Kentucky
G/F	14	Richie Frahm	6 ft 5 in (1.96 m)	210 lb (95 kg)		Gonzaga
F	38	Viktor Khryapa	6 ft 9 in (2.06 m)	235 lb (107 kg)		Russia
F	23	Darius Miles	6 ft 9 in (2.06 m)	235 lb (107 kg)		East St. Louis HS (IL)
F	25	Travis Outlaw	6 ft 9 in (2.06 m)	220 lb (100 kg)		Starkville HS (MS)
G/F	21	Ruben Patterson	6 ft 5 in (1.96 m)	224 lb (102 kg)		Cincinnati
C	10	Joel Przybilla	7 ft 1 in (2.16 m)	245 lb (111 kg)		Minnesota
F/C	50	Zach Randolph (injured)	6 ft 9 in (2.06 m)	260 lb (118 kg)		Michigan State
C	42	Theo Ratliff (injured)	6 ft 10 in (2.08 m)	235 lb (107 kg)		Wyoming
C	5	Ha Seung-jin	7 ft 3 in (2.21 m)	305 lb (138 kg)		Yonsei
G	3	Damon Stoudamire	5 ft 10 in (1.78 m)	171 lb (78 kg)		Arizona
G	31	Sebastian Telfair	6 ft 0 in (1.83 m)	170 lb (77 kg)		Lincoln HS (Brooklyn)
G	19	Nick Van Exel (injured)	6 ft 1 in (1.85 m)	170 lb (77 kg)		Cincinnati

Coaches
Head coach
- Maurice Cheeks (fired)
- Kevin Pritchard (interim)
Assistant(s)
- Tim Grgurich (Pittsburgh)
- John Loyer (Akron)
- Jim Lynam (Saint Joseph's)
- Dan Panaggio (SUNY Brockport)
- Bernard Smith (East Stroudsburg (PA))

Legend
- (DP) Unsigned draft pick
- (FA) Free agent
- (S) Suspended
- Injured

Roster

== Regular season ==
=== Season standings ===
Northwest Division	W	L	PCT	GB	Home	Road	Div
y-Seattle SuperSonics	52	30	.634	–	26–15	26–15	11–5
x-Denver Nuggets	49	33	.598	3	31–10	18–23	9–7
e-Minnesota Timberwolves	44	38	.537	8	24–17	20–21	10–6
e-Portland Trail Blazers	27	55	.329	25	18–23	9–32	4–12
e-Utah Jazz	26	56	.317	26	18–23	8–33	6–10

#	Western Conference				
#	Team	W	L	PCT	GB
1	z-Phoenix Suns	62	20	.756	—
2	y-San Antonio Spurs	59	23	.720	3
3	y-Seattle SuperSonics	52	30	.634	10
4	x-Dallas Mavericks	58	24	.707	4
5	x-Houston Rockets	51	31	.622	11
6	x-Sacramento Kings	50	32	.610	12
7	x-Denver Nuggets	49	33	.598	13
8	x-Memphis Grizzlies	45	37	.549	17
9	e-Minnesota Timberwolves	44	38	.537	18
10	e-Los Angeles Clippers	37	45	.451	25
11	e-Los Angeles Lakers	34	48	.415	28
12	e-Golden State Warriors	34	48	.415	28
13	e-Portland Trail Blazers	27	55	.329	35
14	e-Utah Jazz	26	56	.317	36
15	e-New Orleans Hornets	18	64	.220	44

z - clinched division title
y - clinched division title
x - clinched playoff spot

=== Game log ===
Date	opponent	score	record
November 3	@ Golden State	78-75	1–0
November 5	vs LA Clippers	94-81	2–0
November 7	@ Toronto	97-101	2–1
November 9	@ New Jersey	60-64	2-2
November 10	@ Boston	88-90	2–3
November 13	vs Toronto	105-102	3-3
November 17	vs Memphis	82-101	3–4
November 19	vs Milwaukee	110-98	4-4
November 21	vs Houston	93-97	4–5
November 23	@ Miami	99-87	5-5
November 24	@ Orlando	89-83	6–5
November 26	@ Dallas	83-92	6-6
November 28	vs New Jersey	83-71	7–6
November 30	vs Seattle	100-94	8–6
December 4	@Seattle	89-99	8–7

== Player statistics ==
Legend
GP	Games played	GS	Games started	MPG	Minutes per game
FG%	Field-goal percentage	3P%	3-point field-goal percentage	FT%	Free-throw percentage
RPG	Rebounds per game	APG	Assists per game	SPG	Steals per game
BPG	Blocks per game	PPG	Points per game

=== Regular season ===
Player	GP	GS	MPG	FG%	3P%	FT%	RPG	APG	SPG	BPG	PPG
Damon Stoudamire	81	70	34.1	.392	.369	.915	3.8	5.7	1.1	.0	15.8
Joel Przybilla	76	50	24.4	.598		.517	7.7	1.0	.3	2.1	6.4
Ruben Patterson	70	36	28.0	.531	.080	.599	3.9	2.0	1.5	.3	11.6
Sebastian Telfair	68	26	19.6	.393	.246	.789	1.5	3.3	.5	.1	6.8
Theo Ratliff	63	45	27.5	.447		.692	5.3	.5	.4	2.5	4.8
Darius Miles	63	22	27.0	.482	.348	.600	4.7	2.0	1.2	1.2	12.8
Travis Outlaw	59	2	13.4	.498	.400	.653	2.1	.6	.5	.7	5.4
Shareef Abdur-Rahim	54	49	34.6	.503	.385	.866	7.3	2.1	.9	.5	16.8
Nick Van Exel	53	34	30.5	.381	.389	.784	3.0	4.3	.8	.0	11.1
Derek Anderson	47	32	26.4	.389	.384	.805	2.7	3.0	.8	.1	9.2
Zach Randolph	46	37	34.8	.448	.000	.815	9.6	1.9	.7	.4	18.9
Richie Frahm	43	0	11.6	.400	.388	.840	1.4	.7	.3	.1	3.8
Victor Khryapa	32	5	16.3	.435	.364	.548	3.4	.8	.6	.6	4.2
Ha Seung-jin	19	0	5.5	.435		.545	.9	.1	.1	.3	1.4
James Thomas^{†}	9	2	12.4	.611		.333	3.9	.4	.4	.4	2.7
Geno Carlisle	6	0	2.7	.667		.667	.2	.2	.0	.0	1.3
Maurice Baker^{†}	4	0	4.5	.000			.5	.3	.3	.0	.0

- ^{†} Denotes player spent time with another team in the season. Stats reflect time with the Trail Blazers only.
