= 2004–05 Golden State Warriors season =

NBA professional basketball team season

- Head coach: Mike Montgomery
- General manager: Chris Mullin
- Owners: Chris Cohan
- Arena: Oakland Arena

Results
- Record: 34–48 (.415)
- Place: Division: 5th (Pacific); Conference: 12th (Western)
- Playoff finish: Did not qualify
- Stats at Basketball Reference

The 2004–05 Golden State Warriors season was the Warriors' 59th season in the National Basketball Association, and 43rd season in the San Francisco Bay Area. During the offseason, the Warriors signed free agent Derek Fisher. Under new head coach Mike Montgomery, the Warriors stumbled out of the gate losing their first six games on their way to an awful 3–12 start. Their struggles continued posting a nine-game losing streak in January, losing 14 of their 15 games during the month. At midseason, the team traded Speedy Claxton to the New Orleans Hornets for All-Star guard Baron Davis, and dealt Clifford Robinson to the New Jersey Nets. The deal to acquire Davis would have an immediate impact as suddenly the Warriors became competitive, winning eight straight games between March and April, finishing tied in last place in the Pacific Division with a 34–48 record. Jason Richardson led the team in scoring with 21.7 points per game.

For the season, they added new orange road alternate road uniforms with dark navy blue side panels to their jerseys and shorts, they remained in used until 2010.

== Draft ==
Round	Pick	Player	Position	Nationality	College
1	11	Andris Biedriņš	C	Latvia	(Latvia) Skonto

== Roster ==
Golden State Warriors roster
Players

Pos.	No.	Player	Height	Weight	DOB	From
C	15	Andris Biedriņš	6 ft 11 in (2.11 m)	240 lb (109 kg)		Latvia
F	11	Žarko Čabarkapa	6 ft 11 in (2.11 m)	235 lb (107 kg)		Serbia
G/F	40	Calbert Cheaney	6 ft 7 in (2.01 m)	209 lb (95 kg)		Indiana
G	5	Baron Davis	6 ft 3 in (1.91 m)	209 lb (95 kg)		UCLA
SF	34	Mike Dunleavy Jr.	6 ft 9 in (2.06 m)	230 lb (104 kg)		Duke
G	4	Derek Fisher	6 ft 1 in (1.85 m)	200 lb (91 kg)		Little Rock
C	31	Adonal Foyle	6 ft 10 in (2.08 m)	270 lb (122 kg)		Colgate
PF	1	Troy Murphy	6 ft 11 in (2.11 m)	245 lb (111 kg)		Notre Dame
SF	2	Mickaël Piétrus	6 ft 6 in (1.98 m)	215 lb (98 kg)		France
SG	23	Jason Richardson	6 ft 6 in (1.98 m)	225 lb (102 kg)		Michigan State
F	20	Nikoloz Tskitishvili	7 ft 0 in (2.13 m)	225 lb (102 kg)		Republic of Georgia
G/F	3	Rodney White	6 ft 9 in (2.06 m)	238 lb (108 kg)		Charlotte

Coaches
Head coach
- Mike Montgomery (Long Beach State)
Assistant(s)
- Mario Elie (American International)
- Keith Smart (Indiana)
- Terry Stotts (Oklahoma)
- Russell Turner (Hampden–Sydney)

Legend
- (DP) Unsigned draft pick
- (FA) Free agent
- (S) Suspended
- Injured

Roster

== Regular season ==
=== Season standings ===
Pacific Division	W	L	PCT	GB	Home	Road	Div
y-Phoenix Suns	62	20	.756	–	31–10	31–10	12–4
x-Sacramento Kings	50	32	.610	12	30–11	20–21	10–6
e-Los Angeles Clippers	37	45	.451	25	27–14	10–31	6–10
e-Los Angeles Lakers	34	48	.415	28	22–19	12–29	6–10
e-Golden State Warriors	34	48	.415	28	20–21	14–27	6–10

#	Western Conference				
#	Team	W	L	PCT	GB
1	z-Phoenix Suns	62	20	.756	—
2	y-San Antonio Spurs	59	23	.720	3
3	y-Seattle SuperSonics	52	30	.634	10
4	x-Dallas Mavericks	58	24	.707	4
5	x-Houston Rockets	51	31	.622	11
6	x-Sacramento Kings	50	32	.610	12
7	x-Denver Nuggets	49	33	.598	13
8	x-Memphis Grizzlies	45	37	.549	17
9	e-Minnesota Timberwolves	44	38	.537	18
10	e-Los Angeles Clippers	37	45	.451	25
11	e-Los Angeles Lakers	34	48	.415	28
12	e-Golden State Warriors	34	48	.415	28
13	e-Portland Trail Blazers	27	55	.329	35
14	e-Utah Jazz	26	56	.317	36
15	e-New Orleans Hornets	18	64	.220	44

== Player statistics ==
Legend
GP	Games played	GS	Games started	MPG	Minutes per game
FG%	Field-goal percentage	3P%	3-point field-goal percentage	FT%	Free-throw percentage
RPG	Rebounds per game	APG	Assists per game	SPG	Steals per game
BPG	Blocks per game	PPG	Points per game

=== Regular season ===
Player	GP	GS	MPG	FG%	3P%	FT%	RPG	APG	SPG	BPG	PPG
Mike Dunleavy Jr.	79	79	32.5	.451	.388	.779	5.5	2.6	1.0	.3	13.4
Adonal Foyle	78	50	21.8	.502		.556	5.5	.7	.3	2.0	4.5
Derek Fisher	74	32	30.0	.393	.371	.862	2.9	4.1	1.0	.1	11.9
Jason Richardson	72	72	37.8	.446	.338	.693	5.9	3.9	1.5	.4	21.7
Troy Murphy	70	69	33.9	.414	.399	.730	10.8	1.4	.8	.5	15.4
Mickaël Piétrus	67	3	20.0	.427	.344	.698	2.8	1.2	.7	.3	9.5
Calbert Cheaney	55	5	17.3	.426	.000	.649	2.3	1.2	.3	.3	4.5
Speedy Claxton^{†}	46	44	32.6	.431	.192	.761	3.3	6.2	1.9	.1	13.1
Clifford Robinson^{†}	42	29	26.0	.398	.331	.603	2.7	1.8	1.0	.9	8.5
Eduardo Nájera^{†}	42	4	14.5	.407	.400	.644	2.8	.9	.4	.2	4.2
Žarko Čabarkapa^{†}	37	0	12.5	.482	.361	.813	2.7	.7	.3	.1	6.2
Dale Davis^{†}	36	3	16.0	.413		.579	4.3	.6	.4	.9	3.1
Andris Biedriņš	30	1	12.8	.577	.000	.475	3.9	.4	.4	.8	3.6
Baron Davis^{†}	28	19	35.3	.401	.341	.755	3.9	8.3	1.8	.4	19.5
Rodney White^{†}	16	0	9.1	.371	.313	.600	.9	.5	.1	.1	3.6
Ansu Sesay	16	0	8.0	.405	.250	.542	2.4	.8	.1	.2	3.1
Luis Flores^{†}	15	0	4.9	.481	.444	1.000	.1	.7	.1	.0	2.1
Nikoloz Tskitishvili^{†}	12	0	5.2	.304	.200		1.0	.5	.0	.3	1.3

- ^{†} Denotes player spent time with another team in the season. Stats reflect time with the Warriors only.

== Transactions ==
=== Trades ===
August 24, 2004	To Golden State Warriors Christian Laettner; Eduardo Nájera; Draft rights to Luis Flores; Draft rights to Mladen Šekularac; 2007 1st round-pick Cash considerations	To Dallas Mavericks Erick Dampier; Dan Dickau; Evan Eschmeyer; Steve Logan
January 3, 2005	To Golden State Warriors Žarko Čabarkapa	To Phoenix Suns 2007 2nd round-pick 2009 2nd round-pick
February 14, 2005	To Golden State Warriors 2005 2nd round-pick 2007 2nd round-pick	To New Jersey Nets Clifford Robinson
February 24, 2005	To Golden State Warriors Baron Davis	To New Orleans Hornets Speedy Claxton; Dale Davis
February 24, 2005	To Golden State Warriors Nikoloz Tskitishvili; Rodney White	To Denver Nuggets Eduardo Nájera; Luis Flores; 2007 1st round-pick

=== Free agency ===
==== Re-signed ====
Player	Signed
Adonal Foyle	
Calbert Cheaney	

==== Additions ====
Player	Signed	Former team
Derek Fisher	6-year contract worth $37 million	Los Angeles Lakers

==== Subtractions ====
Player	Reason left	New team
Christian Laettner	Waived	Miami Heat
