= Luis Flores (basketball) =

Dominican basketball player (born 1981)

Tijuana Zonkeys
- Title: Head coach
- League: CIBACOPA

Personal information
- Born: April 11, 1981 (age 45) San Pedro de Macoris, Dominican Republic
- Listed height: 6 ft 2 in (1.88 m)
- Listed weight: 205 lb (93 kg)

Career information
- High school: Norman Thomas (New York City, New York)
- College: Rutgers (1999–2000); Manhattan (2001–2004)
- NBA draft: 2004: 2nd round, 55th overall pick
- Drafted by: Houston Rockets
- Playing career: 2004–2020
- Position: Point guard
- Number: 6, 12
- Coaching career: 2026–present

Career history

Playing
- 2004–2005: Golden State Warriors
- 2005: Denver Nuggets
- 2005–2006: BT Roseto
- 2006–2007: Bipop Carire Reggio Emilia
- 2007: Cocolos de San Pedro de Macorís
- 2007: Olympias Patras
- 2008: Indesit Fabriano
- 2008–2009: Hapoel Holon
- 2009: Marinos de Anzoátegui
- 2009–2010: Krasnye Krylia
- 2010–2011: Donetsk
- 2011: Leones de Santo Domingo
- 2011–2012: Estudiantes
- 2012: Budivelnyk Kyiv
- 2012: Titanes del Licey
- 2013: Hapoel Eliat
- 2013: Guaiqueríes de Margarita
- 2013: Titanes del Licey
- 2015: Guaros de Lara
- 2016: BC Nokia
- 2016: Ostioneros de Guaymas
- 2016: Indios de San Francisco de Macorís
- 2017: Capitanes de Ciudad de México
- 2018: Náuticos de Mazatlán
- 2018: Club Huellas Del Siglo
- 2018: Metros de Santiago
- 2019: Venados de Mazatlán
- 2019: Plaza Fernando Valerio

Coaching
- 2026–present: Tijuana Zonkeys

Career highlights
- Israeli Cup winner (2009); Israeli League Top Scorer (2009); 2× MAAC Player of the Year (2003, 2004); 3× First-team All-MAAC (2002–2004); 2× Haggerty Award (2003, 2004)
- Stats at NBA.com
- Stats at Basketball Reference
Medals
Representing Dominican Republic
Men's basketball
Centrobasket
Silver medal – second place	2003 Culiacan
Pan American Games
Silver medal – second place	2003 Santo Domingo
FIBA AmeriCup
Bronze medal – third place	2011 Argentina

Luis Alberto Flores (born April 11, 1981) is a Dominican former professional basketball player. He is a 6 ft 2 in (1.88 m) tall point guard-shooting guard. He grew up in the United States, in the predominantly Dominican neighborhood of Washington Heights, in New York City, and attended Norman Thomas High School. Flores is a member of the senior Dominican Republic national basketball team. He was the 2009 top scorer in the Israel Basketball Premier League.

== High school ==
Flores attended Norman Thomas High School, in New York City, where he played high school basketball.

== College career ==
Flores played his freshman college basketball season with Rutgers University, but he really showed all his potential during his three years with Manhattan College. He finished his career as Manhattan's all-time leading scorer, averaging 22.7 points per game. He was named All-Metro Atlantic Athletic Conference Player of the Year and Tournament Most Valuable Player, both in his junior and senior season. He also was selected to the All-Metro Atlantic Athletic Conference First Team, during his three seasons in Manhattan, and was the 2003 and 2004 recipient of the Haggerty Award, being named the top player in the NYC area - only the eighth player to win the award multiple times, in the 70+ year history of the honor.

== Professional career ==
Flores was drafted by the Houston Rockets, in the 2nd round (55th pick) of the 2004 NBA draft. His draft rights were traded to the Dallas Mavericks, along with $300,000 cash, in exchange for the draft rights to Vassilis Spanoulis, before being traded to the Golden State Warriors, on August 24, 2004. He played in 15 games with the Warriors (4.9 min per game), before being traded to the Denver Nuggets, on February 24, 2005. He appeared only in one game with the Nuggets, playing 4 minutes, and was waived on August 30. Flores played three preseason games for the New Orleans Hornets in 2006. After not making the Hornets regular season roster, Flores left for Europe.

Overseas, Flores first played in Italy, for BT Roseto (November 2005–2006), and Bipop Carire Reggio Emilia (December 2006–2007). On August 8, 2007, he signed with Greek League team Olympias Patras. In January, 2008, Flores returned to Italy, where he signed with Italian 2nd Division team Indesit Fabriano.

2008–2009 saw Flores in Israel, playing impressively for Ligat HaAl's defending champion, Hapoel Holon. Flores helped Holon to their first Israeli State Cup title. He was the 2009 top scorer in the Israel Basketball Premier League. He left the team in the summer of 2009, to sign in Russia, for Krasnye Krylya Samara.

In 2011, he signed with Asefa Estudiantes in Spain; he later left for the birth of his child. Then he signed with Budivelnyk Kyiv of Ukraine. After ending the season, Flores joined the Titanes del Licey of the Dominican Republic, where he made the playoffs, before being eliminated in the 1st round.

== National team career ==
As a member of the senior Dominican Republic national basketball team, Flores played at the following tournaments: the 2003 Centrobasket, where he won a silver medal, the 2003 Pan American Games, where he won a silver medal, the 2005 FIBA Americas Championship, the 2009 FIBA Americas Championship, the 2011 FIBA Americas Championship, where he won a bronze medal, and the 2015 FIBA Americas Championship.

== Career statistics ==
Legend
GP	Games played	GS	Games started	MPG	Minutes per game
FG%	Field goal percentage	3P%	3-point field goal percentage	FT%	Free throw percentage
RPG	Rebounds per game	APG	Assists per game	SPG	Steals per game
BPG	Blocks per game	PPG	Points per game	**Bold**	Career high

=== NBA ===
==== Regular season ====
Year	Team	GP	GS	MPG	FG%	3P%	FT%	RPG	APG	SPG	BPG	PPG
2004–05	Golden State	**15**	0	**4.9**	.481	.444	**1.000**	.1	**.7**	**.1**	**.1**	2.1
2004–05	Denver	1	0	4.0	**.500**	**1.000**	—	**1.0**	—	—	—	**3.0**
Career		16	0	4.8	.483	.500	1.000	.2	.7	.1	.1	2.2
