= Tony Bobbitt =

American basketball player (born 1979)

Personal information
- Born: October 22, 1979 (age 47) Daytona Beach, Florida
- Listed height: 6 ft 4 in (1.93 m)
- Listed weight: 205 lb (93 kg)

Career information
- High school: Mainland (Daytona Beach, Florida)
- College: College of Southern Idaho (2000–2002); Cincinnati (2002–2004)
- NBA draft: 2004: undrafted
- Playing career: 2004–2012
- Position: Shooting guard
- Number: 15

Career history
- 2005: Los Angeles Lakers
- 2005–2006: Air Avellino
- 2006–2007: Bakersfield Jam
- 2007: Colorado 14ers
- 2007: Oklahoma Storm
- 2008: Eisbären Bremerhaven
- 2008: Colorado 14ers
- 2009–2010: Maine Red Claws
- 2010: Springfield Armor
- 2010: AEK Larnaca
- 2010–2011: Huracanes de Tampico
- 2011: Springfield Armor
- 2011–2012: Idaho Stampede

Career highlights
- Third-team All-C-USA (2004)
- Stats at NBA.com
- Stats at Basketball Reference

Tony Rachaun Bobbitt (born October 22, 1979) is a former American professional basketball player.

Bobbitt played alongside National Basketball Association (NBA) player Vince Carter at Daytona Beach Mainland High School, where he graduated in 1999. Bobbitt played for the College of Southern Idaho (NJCAA) from 2000 to 2002 and then transferred to the University of Cincinnati for his junior and senior years. As a senior with the Bearcats, Bobbitt averaged 13.3 points per games and was named third-team all-conference in Conference USA, becoming just the third reserve in the league's then-nine year history to earn all-conference honors. He was signed as an undrafted free agent by the Los Angeles Lakers in January 2005, playing 2 games for them during the 2004–05 NBA season.
