= Eli Cross (director) =

American pornographic film director (born 1967)

- Born: Bryn Pryor; November 10, 1967 (age 58); Phoenix, Arizona, U.S.
- Other names: Mark Logan, Robert April, Gus Delario, Eli Cash
- Height: 5 ft 8 in (1.73 m)
- Spouse: Casey Calvert

Bryn Pryor (born November 10, 1967), better known professionally as Eli Cross, is an American pornographic and mainstream movie director, producer, and actor. He was inducted into the AVN Hall of Fame in 2015.

== Career ==
Under the name of Mark Logan, Cross was managing editor of AVN. Unlike many adult industry professionals, Cross does not keep his birth name a secret. He has won awards, and keeps a blog, under his own name. His mainstream work is performed under his birth name of Bryn Pryor.

He is best known for his films The Visitor (2003) from Elegant Angel, Epiphany (2004) from VCA Xplicit, Corruption (2006), Upload (2007), and Icon (2008) from SexZ Pictures, The 8th Day, which Cross produced for Adam & Eve Pictures, and Star Wars XXX: A Porn Parody, which Cross wrote (as Mark Logan) and produced for Vivid Entertainment and Axel Braun Productions (2012).

Cross' biggest films have received significant acclaim in the adult industry. Corruption won 7 AVN Awards including Best Video, with Cross receiving Best Director - Video. Upload received 22 AVN Awards nominations, including a Best Director - Video nomination for Cross, and another win for Best Video. Both movies also received similar nominations and awards from XRCO, XBiz, Adam Film World Guide, and Nightmoves magazine.

Icon received the AVN Award for Best High-End All-Sex Video in 2009, with Cross winning Best Director - All-Sex. In 2010, the Cross-produced The 8th Day won 7 AVN Awards including Best Video.

In 2007, following the success of Corruption, Cross became Head of Production for SexZ Pictures. However, a dispute between Cross and SexZ over his work on The 8th Day created stress between Cross and Bo Kenney, the owner of SexZ. Press releases were issued stating that the two parties had resolved their differences, but in 2009, as Cross was in pre-production on a film called Daughter of the Wolf, SexZ abruptly released him from his contract. SexZ Pictures stopped producing videos soon after.

In 2010, Cross produced and directed adult features for French magazine Hot Vidéo, including the comedy Kiss of the Strangler. In 2011, Cross began writing and photographing adult features for acclaimed porn director Axel Braun, primarily parodies of popular comic book and science fiction films. In 2012, Cross shared the AVN Award for Best Cinematography with Braun for their work on Spider-Man XXX: A Porn Parody. In 2013, Star Wars XXX: A Porn Parody, produced by Cross, won 8 AVN Awards, including Best Parody-Comedy, and Best Selling and Best Renting title of the year.

Cross' 2014 Vivid Entertainment film Wetwork won several 2015 XBiz Awards including Feature Movie of the Year. Wetwork also won Best Epic from XRCO in 2015.

His stage name comes from the character played by Peter O'Toole in the 1980 film The Stunt Man.

== Mainstream work ==
In 2012, under his birth name Bryn Pryor, Cross was the director of photography on the mainstream horror film iKllr.

In 2013, Cross, along with producers James Deen and Charles Mead, mounted a successful Kickstarter campaign that raised nearly $115,000 to finance a short film called Cowboys & Engines. Described as a "Steampunk Western," the short starred Malcolm McDowell, Walter Koenig and Richard Hatch. According to the film's website filming was completed in early June, 2013, and the film's trailer premiered at the 2013 Comic-Con. The film had its cast & crew premiere at the Landmark Theater on January 14, 2015. The official Cowboys & Engines trailer was released online in February 2015, and according to the film's blog, Cowboys & Engines had been accepted by several film festivals to be screened in 2015/2016.

In February 2015, Showtime premiered the Pryor-directed X-Rated: The Greatest Adult Movies of All Time, a documentary profiling a handful of major adult films from Deep Throat in the 1970s through the modern era. In 2016, Pryor, along with Sarah Goldberger co-wrote the screenplay for Diminuendo, a feature film starring several actors from Cowboys & Engines including Hatch (in his final film role before his death) and Koenig. Also starring in the film were Chloe Dykstra, Leah Cairns and Gigi Edgley.

Diminuendo had its world premiere at the 20th Annual Sarasota Film Festival on April 20, 2018

== Personal life ==
Cross is married to actress and filmmaker Casey Calvert.

== Awards ==
- 2007 AVN Award – Best Director, Video – (Corruption)
- 2007 AVN Award – Best Screenplay (with Alvin Edwards) – (Corruption)
- 2007 AVN Award – Best Editing, Video (as Mark Logan; with Robin Dyer) – (Corruption)
- 2007 Adam Film World Guide Award – Best Director – (Corruption)
- 2007 Adam Film World Guide Award – Best Screenplay (with Alvin Edwards) – (Corruption)
- 2007 NightMoves Award – Best Director – (Corruption)
- 2007 AVN Award – Best Non-Sex Performance (as Bryn Pryor) – (Corruption)
- 2008 AVN Award – Best Non-Sex Performance (as Bryn Pryor) – (Upload)
- 2008 AVN Award – Best Screenplay (with Alvin Edwards) – (Upload)
- 2008 Adam Film World Guide Award – Best Director – (Upload)
- 2009 AVN Award – Best Director, Non-Feature – (Icon)
- 2012 AVN Award – Best Cinematography (with Axel Braun) – (Spider-Man XXX: A Porn Parody)
- 2015 XBIZ Award – Director of the Year, Feature Release – (Wetwork)
- 2015 XBIZ Award – Best Cinematography (with Nic Danger and Alex Ladd) – (Wetwork)
- 2015 XBIZ Award – Best Editing (as Robert April) – (Wetwork)
- 2015 AVN Award – Best Screenplay, Parody (with Alex Braun) – (24 XXX: An Alex Braun Parody)
- 2015 AVN Hall of Fame
- 2021 AVN Award – Best Directing, Comedy (with Casey Calvert) – (Cougar Queen: A Tiger King Parody)
