= 2004–05 Phoenix Suns season =

NBA team season

- Division champions
- Head coach: Mike D'Antoni
- General manager: Bryan Colangelo
- Owner: Robert Sarver
- Arena: America West Arena

Results
- Record: 62–20 (.756)
- Place: Division: 1st (Pacific); Conference: 1st (Western)
- Playoff finish: Western Conference Finals (lost to Spurs 1–4)
- Stats at Basketball Reference

Local media
- Television: KUTP; FSN Arizona
- Radio: KTAR

The 2004–05 Phoenix Suns season was the 37th for the Phoenix Suns in the National Basketball Association. During the offseason, the Suns re-acquired All-Star guard Steve Nash from the Dallas Mavericks, and signed free agent Quentin Richardson. During that same period of time, it also became the team's first season under Robert Sarver's ownership tenure, as he controlled major duties with the franchise for 18 seasons after Jerry Colangelo sold the team to him until a year-long suspension during the 2022–23 season for actions he did behind the scenes from as early as this season caused him to eventually sell off the team during that season in 2023. Also during that same period of time, the Suns would honor former head coach and broadcaster Cotton Fitzsimmons, who died on July 25, 2004, by wearing a white patch on their jerseys for the entire season, including their playoff run. The Suns got off to a fast start winning 31 of their first 35 games, but then lost six straight afterwards. They finished with the best record in the NBA at 62–20 under head coach Mike D'Antoni, tying their franchise best 1992–93 season record which would hold until 2021-22, when they won 64 games. Three members of the team, Nash, Amar'e Stoudemire, and Shawn Marion were all selected for the 2005 NBA All-Star Game. The Suns also gained solid play from Richardson and Joe Johnson. Nash finished the season averaging 11.5 assists per game, while making 50.2% of his field goals and 43.1% of his three-pointers in the regular season. He ended up winning the MVP award. D'Antoni was awarded Coach of the Year, and Bryan Colangelo Executive of the Year.

In the first round of the playoffs, the Suns swept the Memphis Grizzlies in four games, and, in the semifinals, defeated Nash's former team, the Dallas Mavericks, in six games. In the Western Conference finals, however, the Suns lost 4–1 to the 2-seed, and eventual NBA champion, San Antonio Spurs. The Suns' 62–20 record was the best in the league and tied the franchise record for wins. The 33-win improvement over the 2003–04 campaign constituted the third-best year-to-year jump in NBA history. The 2004-05 Phoenix Suns were the youngest team to earn the 1-seed since seeding began in 1984 (and held the record until the 2023-24 Oklahoma City Thunder displaced them). Following the season, Johnson was traded to the Atlanta Hawks, and Richardson was dealt to the New York Knicks.

== Offseason ==
=== NBA draft ===
Round	Pick	Player	Position	Nationality	College
1	7	Luol Deng	Forward	United Kingdom	Duke

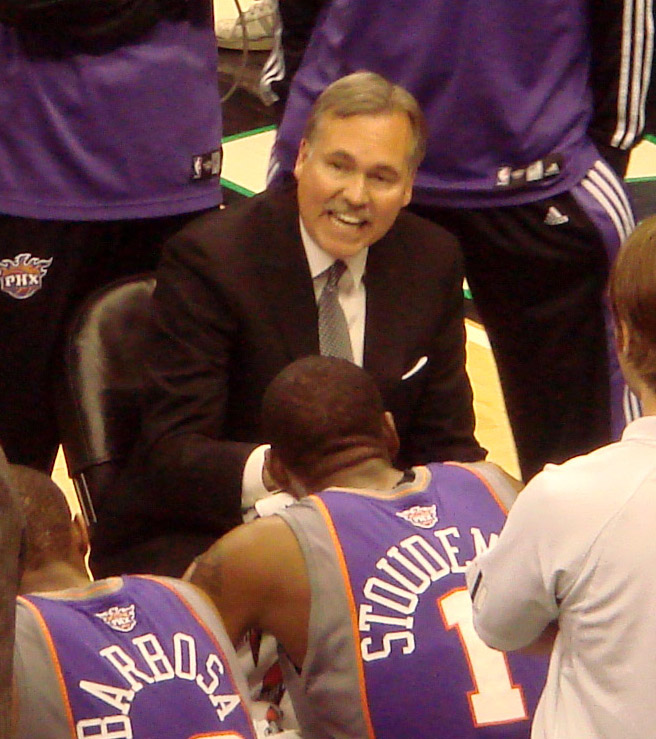
Head coach Mike D'Antoni

The Suns drafted Luol Deng with the 7th pick, who was immediately traded to the Chicago Bulls for second-round pick Jackson Vroman, a conditional first-round pick (which conveyed as the 21st overall pick in 2005), and cash considerations. The Suns received the 16th pick (Kirk Snyder) in a trade with the New York Knicks, but traded the pick to the Utah Jazz. The Suns second-round pick was traded to the Orlando Magic in 2003.

=== Free agency ===
After trading Stephon Marbury (owed $76 million through 2008–09) and Penny Hardaway (owed $30.4 million through 2005–06), the Suns freed enough cap space to sign free agent point guard Steve Nash to a 6-year, $65.6 million deal, with a sixth-year team option, and swingman Quentin Richardson to a 6-year, $43.5 million deal, with a sixth-year player option. The Suns also signed Steven Hunter, Yuta Tabuse and Derrick Dial as free agents. Hunter played the season as a back-up center, Tabuse played 4 games before being waived in December, and Dial was waived before the start of the season.

== Regular season ==
Before the season, the Suns were widely predicted to finish in the middle of the pack of the Western Conference. Defying expectations, Phoenix won 31 of its first 35 games. The team then lost its next six games, in large part due to a thigh injury suffered by Nash. Despite this minor blip, the Suns finished with a record of 62–20. Nash won the NBA Most Valuable Player Award, while three Suns – Nash, Stoudemire, and Marion – were named to an All-NBA Team.

In their first full year under D'Antoni, the Suns channeled his particular basketball philosophy, which emphasized rapid ball movement, pick-and-rolls, and high-volume three-point shooting. This style of play benefitted from rule changes enacted in 2002, which including new penalties against hand check fouls committed on the perimeter. Over the course of the season, Phoenix led the NBA in a large number of metrics, including points per possession, points per game, three-point shots attempted, and three-point shooting percentage. The Suns' fast style of play earned them the moniker "Seven Seconds or Less."

== Legacy ==
Writing for the Washington Post in 2017, Tim Bontemps credited D'Antoni and his Suns teams – starting with the 2004–05 squad – with demonstrating the possibility of success for a team built to play small ball, run a high-tempo offense, and shoot a large number of three-pointers. Bontemps argued that the Suns' model inspired teams around the league to adopt many of D'Antoni's offensive principles, leading to dramatic changes in the NBA's style of play. Other writers have made similar arguments in favor of the proposition that the "Seven Seconds or Less" Suns revolutionized the modern game of basketball.

Multiple commentators have drawn direct parallels between D'Antoni's Phoenix teams and the 2015–16 Golden State Warriors, who also shot a large number of three-pointers and used small ball lineups. The Stephen Curry-led Warriors set the regular season record of 73 wins before falling to the Cleveland Cavaliers in the 2016 NBA Finals.

The team's roster is featured in the video games NBA 2K16, NBA 2K17, and NBA 2K18.

== Roster ==
2004–05 Phoenix Suns roster
Players

Pos.	No.	Player	Height	Weight	DOB	From
G	10	Leandro Barbosa	6 ft 3 in (1.91 m)	176 lb (80 kg)	1982-11-28	Brazil
F/C	45	Steven Hunter	7 ft 0 in (2.13 m)	220 lb (100 kg)	1981-10-31	DePaul
G/F	21	Jim Jackson	6 ft 6 in (1.98 m)	220 lb (100 kg)	1970-10-14	Ohio State
G/F	2	Joe Johnson	6 ft 8 in (2.03 m)	225 lb (102 kg)	1981-06-29	Arkansas
F	31	Shawn Marion	6 ft 7 in (2.01 m)	220 lb (100 kg)	1978-05-07	UNLV
F	0	Walter McCarty	6 ft 10 in (2.08 m)	230 lb (104 kg)	1974-02-01	Kentucky
PG	13	Steve Nash	6 ft 3 in (1.91 m)	195 lb (88 kg)	1974-02-07	Santa Clara
F	46	Bo Outlaw	6 ft 8 in (2.03 m)	210 lb (95 kg)	1971-04-13	Houston
G/F	3	Quentin Richardson	6 ft 6 in (1.98 m)	223 lb (101 kg)	1980-04-13	DePaul
PF	17	Paul Shirley	6 ft 10 in (2.08 m)	230 lb (104 kg)	1977-12-23	Iowa State
F/C	32	Amar'e Stoudemire	6 ft 10 in (2.08 m)	245 lb (111 kg)	1982-11-16	Cypress Creek HS (FL)
C	43	Jake Voskuhl	6 ft 11 in (2.11 m)	245 lb (111 kg)	1977-11-01	Connecticut

Coaches
Head coach
- (United States) Mike D'Antoni (Marshall)
Assistant(s)
- (United States) Alvin Gentry (Appalachian State)
- (United States) Marc Iavaroni (Virginia)
- (United States) Todd Quinter (Lebanon Valley)
- (United States) Phil Weber (NC State)

Legend
- (DP) Unsigned draft pick
- (FA) Free agent
- (S) Suspended
- Injured

== Results ==
=== Standings ===
Pacific Division	W	L	PCT	GB	Home	Road	Div
y-Phoenix Suns	62	20	.756	–	31–10	31–10	12–4
x-Sacramento Kings	50	32	.610	12	30–11	20–21	10–6
e-Los Angeles Clippers	37	45	.451	25	27–14	10–31	6–10
e-Los Angeles Lakers	34	48	.415	28	22–19	12–29	6–10
e-Golden State Warriors	34	48	.415	28	20–21	14–27	6–10

#	Western Conference				
#	Team	W	L	PCT	GB
1	z-Phoenix Suns	62	20	.756	—
2	y-San Antonio Spurs	59	23	.720	3
3	y-Seattle SuperSonics	52	30	.634	10
4	x-Dallas Mavericks	58	24	.707	4
5	x-Houston Rockets	51	31	.622	11
6	x-Sacramento Kings	50	32	.610	12
7	x-Denver Nuggets	49	33	.598	13
8	x-Memphis Grizzlies	45	37	.549	17
9	e-Minnesota Timberwolves	44	38	.537	18
10	e-Los Angeles Clippers	37	45	.451	25
11	e-Los Angeles Lakers	34	48	.415	28
12	e-Golden State Warriors	34	48	.415	28
13	e-Portland Trail Blazers	27	55	.329	35
14	e-Utah Jazz	26	56	.317	36
15	e-New Orleans Hornets	18	64	.220	44

== Playoffs ==
=== Game log ===
2005 playoff game log
First Round: 4–0 (home: 2–0; road: 2–0)

Game	Date	Team	Score	High points	High rebounds	High assists	Location Attendance	Series
1	April 24	Memphis	W 114–103	Shawn Marion (26)	Shawn Marion (13)	Steve Nash (13)	America West Arena; 18,422	1–0
2	April 27	Memphis	W 108–103	Amar'e Stoudemire (34)	Shawn Marion (13)	Steve Nash (15)	America West Arena; 18,422	2–0
3	April 29	@ Memphis	W 110–90	Amar'e Stoudemire (30)	Shawn Marion (13)	Steve Nash (8)	FedExForum; 18,119	3–0
4	May 1	@ Memphis	W 123–115	Joe Johnson (25)	Shawn Marion (11)	Steve Nash (9)	FedExForum; 17,243	4–0

Conference Semifinals: 4–2 (home: 2–1; road: 2–1)

Game	Date	Team	Score	High points	High rebounds	High assists	Location Attendance	Series
1	May 9	Dallas	W 127–102	Amar'e Stoudemire (40)	Amar'e Stoudemire (16)	Steve Nash (13)	America West Arena; 18,422	1–0
2	May 11	Dallas	L 106–108	Amar'e Stoudemire (30)	Amar'e Stoudemire (16)	Steve Nash (13)	America West Arena; 18,422	1–1
3	May 13	@ Dallas	W 119–102	Amar'e Stoudemire (37)	Amar'e Stoudemire (14)	Steve Nash (17)	American Airlines Center; 20,896	2–1
4	May 15	@ Dallas	L 109–119	Steve Nash (48)	Shawn Marion (12)	Steve Nash (5)	American Airlines Center; 20,894	2–2
5	May 18	Dallas	W 114–108	Steve Nash (34)	Amar'e Stoudemire (18)	Steve Nash (12)	America West Arena; 18,422	3–2
6	May 20	@ Dallas	W 130–126 (OT)	Steve Nash (39)	Shawn Marion (16)	Steve Nash (12)	American Airlines Center; 20,915	4–2

Conference Finals: 1–4 (home: 0–3; road: 1–1)

Game	Date	Team	Score	High points	High rebounds	High assists	Location Attendance	Series
1	May 22	San Antonio	L 114–121	Amar'e Stoudemire (41)	Marion, Stoudemire (9)	Steve Nash (13)	America West Arena; 18,422	0–1
2	May 24	San Antonio	L 108–111	Amar'e Stoudemire (37)	Shawn Marion (12)	Steve Nash (15)	America West Arena; 18,422	0–2
3	May 28	@ San Antonio	L 92–102	Amar'e Stoudemire (34)	Amar'e Stoudemire (11)	Johnson, Nash (3)	SBC Center; 18,797	0–3
4	May 30	@ San Antonio	W 111–106	Amar'e Stoudemire (31)	Shawn Marion (14)	Steve Nash (12)	SBC Center; 18,797	1–3
5	June 1	San Antonio	L 95–101	Amar'e Stoudemire (42)	Amar'e Stoudemire (16)	Steve Nash (10)	America West Arena; 18,422	1–4

2005 schedule

== Awards and honors ==
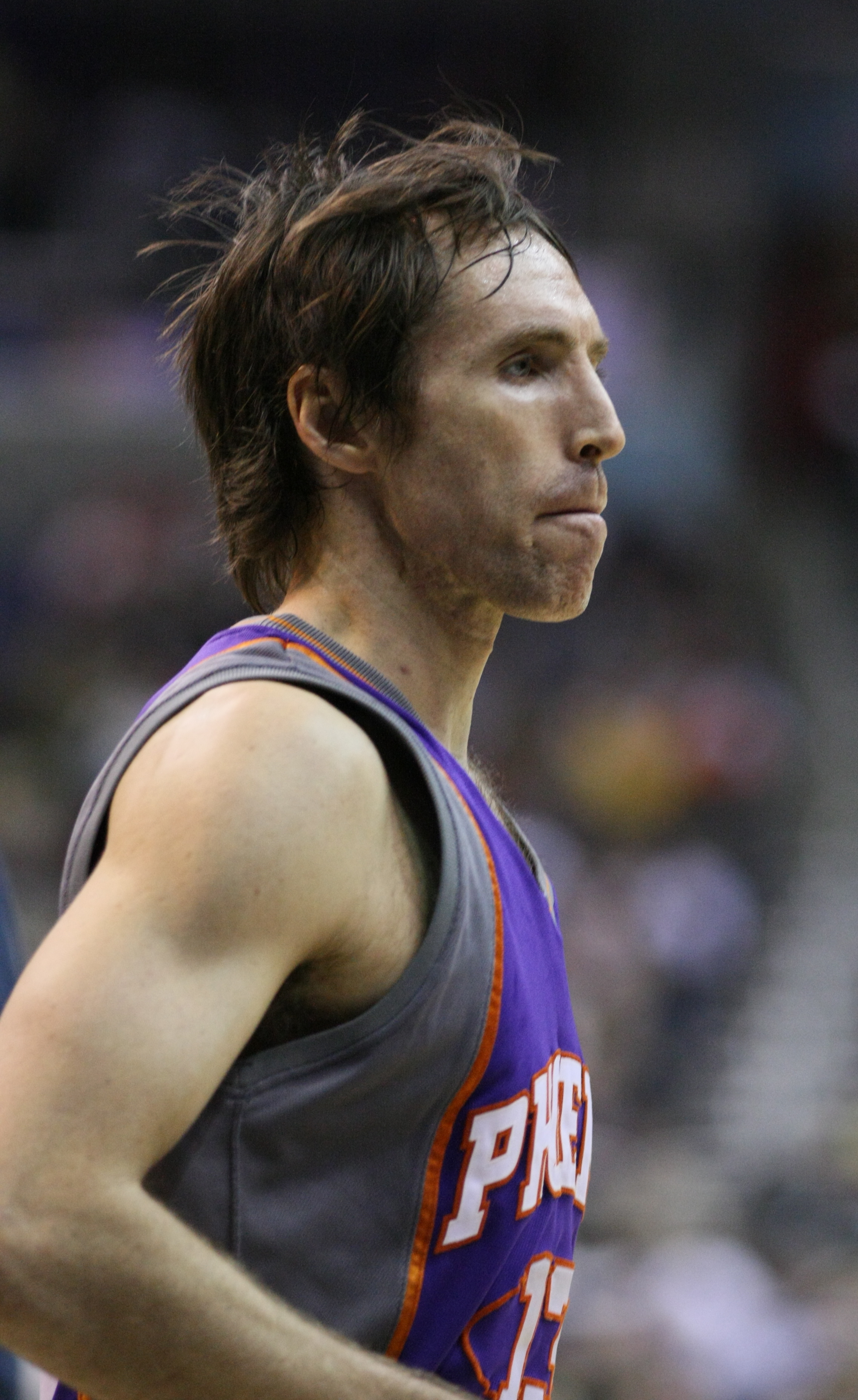
Steve Nash

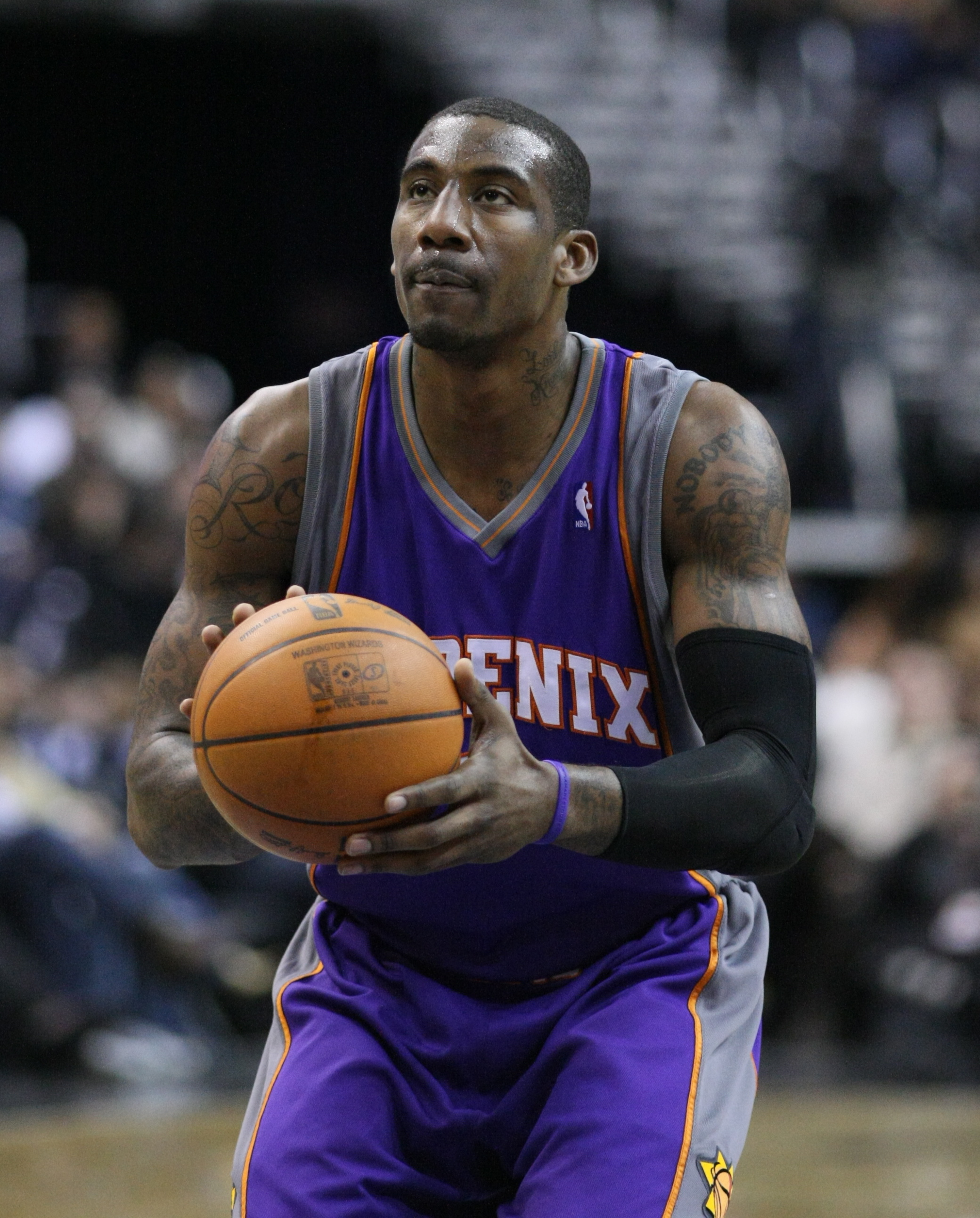
Amar'e Stoudemire

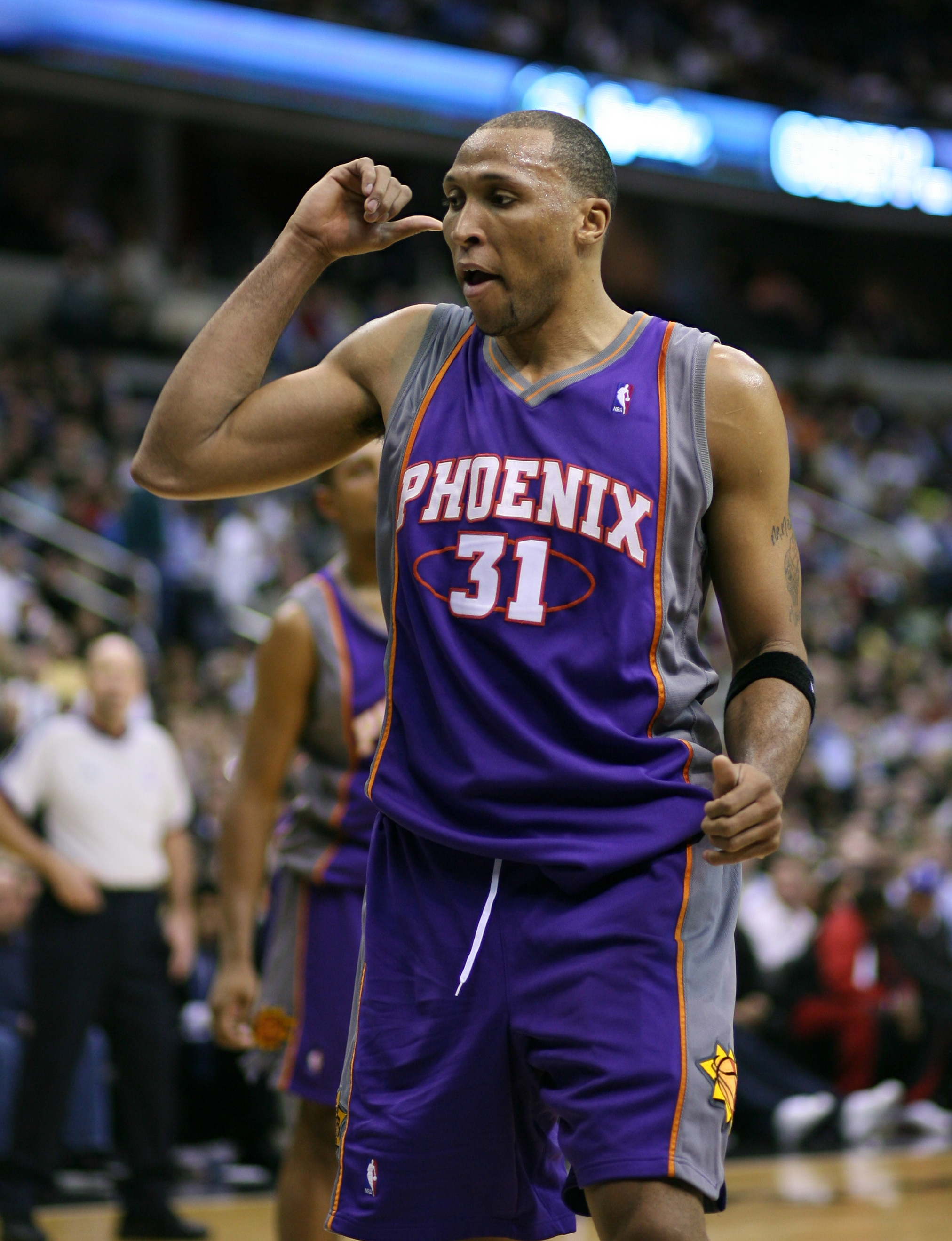
Shawn Marion

=== Week/Month ===
- Amar'e Stoudemire was named Western Conference Player of the Week for games played November 14 through November 20.
- Shawn Marion was named Western Conference Player of the Week for games played November 21 through November 27.
- Amar'e Stoudemire was named Western Conference Player of the Week for games played December 5 through December 11.
- Shawn Marion was named Western Conference Player of the Week for games played December 12 through December 18.
- Steve Nash was named Western Conference Player of the Week for games played December 19 through December 25.
- Steve Nash was named Western Conference Player of the Week for games played February 6 through February 12.
- Steve Nash was named Western Conference Player of the Month for November.
- Amar'e Stoudemire was named Western Conference Player of the Month for April.
- Mike D'Antoni was named Western Conference Coach of the Month for December.

=== All-Star ===
- Steve Nash was selected as a reserve for the Western Conference in the All-Star Game. It was his third All-Star selection. Nash finished third in the All-Star voting among Western Conference guards with 1,148,275 votes.
- Amar'e Stoudemire was selected as a reserve for the Western Conference in the All-Star Game. It was his first All-Star selection. Stoudemire finished fifth in the All-Star voting among Western Conference forwards with 640,370 votes.
- Shawn Marion was selected as a reserve for the Western Conference in the All-Star Game. It was his second All-Star selection. Marion finished eighth in the All-Star voting among Western Conference forwards with 264,203 votes.
- Amar'e Stoudemire was the runner-up in the Slam Dunk Contest, losing to champion Josh Smith. This was the only All-Star Saturday competition not won by Phoenix.
- Quentin Richardson won the Three-Point Shootout.
- Steve Nash won the Skills Challenge competition with a time of 25.8 seconds.
- Team Phoenix, consisting of Shawn Marion, Diana Taurasi and Dan Majerle, won the Shooting Stars Competition.

=== Season ===
- Steve Nash received the NBA Most Valuable Player Award.
- Mike D'Antoni received the NBA Coach of the Year Award.
- Bryan Colangelo received the NBA Executive of the Year Award.
- Steve Nash was named to the All-NBA First Team.
- Amar'e Stoudemire was named to the All-NBA Second Team. Stoudemire also finished 9th in MVP voting, and 7th in Most Improved Player voting.
- Shawn Marion was named to the All-NBA Third Team. Marion also finished 14th in MVP voting, 5th in Defensive Player of the Year voting, and 22nd in Most Improved Player voting.
- Joe Johnson finished 20th in Most Improved Player voting.
- Steve Nash led the league in assists per game, with an 11.5 average.
- Quentin Richardson led the league (with Kyle Korver) in three-point field goals with 226.

== Injuries/Missed games ==
- 11/01/04: Žarko Čabarkapa: Knee tendinitis; placed on injured list until December 7
- 11/08/04: Yuta Tabuse: Strained quadriceps; placed on injured list until December 10
- 11/10/04: Leandro Barbosa: Sprained ankle; did not play
- 11/13/04: Jake Voskuhl: Flu; did not play
- 11/16/04: Leandro Barbosa: Sprained ankle; did not play
- 12/03/04: Maciej Lampe: Flu; did not play
- 12/07/04: Jackson Vroman: Strained groin; placed on injured list until December 18
- 12/10/04: Jake Voskuhl: Appendectomy; placed on injured list until January 3
- 01/02/05: Leandro Barbosa: Chicken pox; did not play
- 01/04/05: Leandro Barbosa: Chicken pox; did not play
- 01/05/05: Leandro Barbosa: Chicken pox; did not play
- 01/10/05: Leandro Barbosa: Sprained ankle; placed on injured list until February 4
- 01/15/05: Steve Nash: Bruised thigh; did not play
- 01/17/05: Steve Nash: Bruised thigh; did not play
- 01/19/05: Steve Nash: Back spasms; did not play
- 02/14/05: Jim Jackson: Sprained foot; did not play
- 02/23/05: Steve Nash; Strained hamstring; did not play
- 02/26/05: Steve Nash; Strained hamstring; did not play
- 02/27/05: Steve Nash; Strained hamstring; did not play
- 03/05/05: Quentin Richardson; Hyperextended knee; did not play
- 03/11/05: Shawn Marion: Bruised knee; did not play
- 03/18/05: Jake Voskuhl: Sprained ankle; did not play
- 03/20/05: Walter McCarty: Back spasms; did not play
- 03/28/05: Amar'e Stoudemire: Ankle inflammation; did not play
- 03/30/05: Amar'e Stoudemire: Ankle inflammation; did not play
- 04/01/05: Walter McCarty: Personal reasons; did not play
- 04/03/05: Walter McCarty: Personal reasons; did not play
- 04/12/05: Quentin Richardson: Sprained ankle; did not play
- 04/15/05: Quentin Richardson: Sprained ankle; did not play
- 04/20/05: Steve Nash: Did not play
- 05/11/05: Joe Johnson: Fractured orbital bone, mild concussion; placed on injured list until May 28

== Player statistics ==
Legend
GP	Games played	GS	Games started	MPG	Minutes per game
FG%	Field-goal percentage	3P%	3-point field-goal percentage	FT%	Free-throw percentage
RPG	Rebounds per game	APG	Assists per game	SPG	Steals per game
BPG	Blocks per game	PPG	Points per game

=== Season ===
Player	GP	GS	MPG	FG%	3P%	FT%	RPG	APG	SPG	BPG	PPG
Leandro Barbosa	63	6	17.3	.475	.367	.797	2.1	2.0	0.5	0.1	7.0
Žarko Čabarkapa*	3	0	3.7	.571†	.	1.000^	1.0	0.0	.0	.0	3.0
Steven Hunter	76	3	13.8	.614†	.000	.479	3.0	0.2	0.1	1.3	4.6
Jim Jackson*	40	3	24.9	.435	.459	.960^	3.9	2.4	0.3	0.1	8.8
Casey Jacobsen*	40	0	19.2	.414	.382	.774	1.7	0.9	0.3	.0	5.3
Joe Johnson	82	82	39.5	.461	.478+	.750	5.1	3.5	1.0	0.3	17.1
Maciej Lampe*	16	0	7.4	.347	.667+	.667	2.0	0.1	0.1	0.1	2.8
Shawn Marion	81	81	38.8	.476	.334	.833	11.3	1.9	2.0	1.5	19.4
Walter McCarty*	28	0	12.6	.388	.385	.500	2.2	0.4	0.4	0.2	3.5
Steve Nash	75	75	34.3	.502	.431	.887^	3.3	11.5	1.0	0.1	15.5
Bo Outlaw	39	0	5.5	.353	.	.556	1.4	0.3	0.2	0.3	0.7
Smush Parker*	5	0	6.8	.467	.250	.	0.6	0.8	0.4	.0	3.0
Quentin Richardson	79	78	35.9	.389	.358	.739	6.1	2.0	1.2	0.3	14.9
Paul Shirley	9	0	3.3	.455	.	.500	0.2	0.3	.0	.0	1.3
Amar'e Stoudemire	80	80	36.1	.559†	.188	.733	8.9	1.6	1.0	1.6	26.0
Yuta Tabuse	4	0	4.3	.167	1.000+	1.000^	1.0	0.8	.0	.0	1.8
Jake Voskuhl	38	1	9.5	.458	.	.684	2.4	0.4	0.1	0.3	2.1
Jackson Vroman*	10	1	5.7	.375	.	.571	1.3	0.7	0.3	0.2	1.6

* – Stats with the Suns.
† – Minimum 300 field goals made.
+ – Minimum 55 three-pointers made.
^ – Minimum 125 free throws made.

=== Playoffs ===
Player	GP	GS	MPG	FG%	3P%	FT%	RPG	APG	SPG	BPG	PPG
Leandro Barbosa	12	0	9.7	.343	.400	.500	1.4	1.0	0.2	.0	2.5
Steven Hunter	15	0	14.2	.558	.	.600	2.5	0.2	0.1	1.2	4.2
Jim Jackson	15	6	31.6	.488	.516	.875	4.1	1.5	0.7	0.5	11.0
Joe Johnson	9	9	39.4	.504	.556	.697	4.3	3.3	1.1	0.4	18.8
Shawn Marion	15	15	42.3	.484	.419	.769	11.8	1.5	1.4	1.7	17.6
Walter McCarty	8	0	6.9	.222	.333	.000	0.8	0.4	0.2	0.2	0.8
Steve Nash	15	15	40.7	.520	.389	.919	4.8	11.3	0.9	0.2	23.9
Bo Outlaw	1	0	2.0	.000	.	.	0.0	1.0	1.0	.0	0.0
Quentin Richardson	15	15	37.6	.403	.390	.639	5.1	1.7	1.3	0.2	11.9
Paul Shirley	0	0	0.0	.	.	.	0.0	0.0	.0	.0	0.0
Amar'e Stoudemire	15	15	40.1	.539	.000	.781	10.7	1.2	0.7	2.0	29.9
Jake Voskuhl	0	0	0.0	.	.	.	0.0	0.0	.0	.0	0.0

== Transactions ==
=== Trades ===
June 22, 2004	To Charlotte Bobcats 2005 first-round draft pick ( (United States) Sean May)	To Phoenix Suns Charlotte agrees to draft Jahidi White in 2004 NBA expansion draft
June 24, 2004	To Chicago Bulls (United Kingdom) / (Sudan) Luol Deng	To Phoenix Suns (Lebanon) Jackson Vroman 2005 first-round draft pick ( (United States) Nate Robinson)
January 3, 2005	To Golden State Warriors (Serbia and Montenegro) Žarko Čabarkapa	To Phoenix Suns 2007 second-round draft pick ( (United States) Aaron Gray) 2009 second-round draft pick ( (United States) DeJuan Blair)
January 21, 2005	To New Orleans Hornets (United States) Casey Jacobsen (Poland) Maciej Lampe (Lebanon) Jackson Vroman	To Phoenix Suns (United States) Jim Jackson 2005 second-round draft pick ( (Poland) Marcin Gortat)
February 8, 2005	To Boston Celtics 2007 second-round draft pick ( (United States) Aaron Gray)	To Phoenix Suns (United States) Walter McCarty

=== Free agents ===
==== Additions ====
Date	Player	Signed	Former Team
July 14, 2004	Steve Nash	Signed 6-year contract for $65.6 million	Dallas Mavericks
July 29, 2004	Quentin Richardson	Signed 6-year contract $43.5 million	Los Angeles Clippers
August 20, 2004	Steven Hunter	Signed 1-year contract for $720,046	Orlando Magic
September 7, 2004	Yuta Tabuse	Signed multi-year contract	Long Beach Jam (ABA)
October 1, 2004	Derrick Dial	Undisclosed	Orlando Magic
November 8, 2004	Bo Outlaw	Signed 1-year contract for $1.1 million	Memphis Grizzlies
January 19, 2005	Smush Parker	Signed two 10-day contracts	Aris Thessaloniki (Greece)
January 23, 2005	Paul Shirley	Signed 2-year contract	Chicago Bulls

==== Subtractions ====
Date	Player	Reason left	New team
June 22, 2004	Jahidi White	Expansion draft	Charlotte Bobcats
July 16, 2004	Antonio McDyess	Free agent	Detroit Pistons
October 22, 2004	Donnell Harvey	Free agent	Atlanta Hawks
October 26, 2004	Derrick Dial	Waived	Anaheim Arsenal (NBA D-League)
October 29, 2004	Howard Eisley	Waived	Utah Jazz
December 19, 2004	Yuta Tabuse	Waived	Bakersfield Jam (NBA D-League)
February 8, 2005	Smush Parker	Waived	Los Angeles Lakers
