= Diminuendo (film) =

- Film poster
- Diminuendo
- Directed by: Adrian Stewart
- Written by: Sarah Goldberger; Bryn Pryor
- Produced by: Sarah Goldberger; Kevin Alexander Heard; Jenifer Ellis; Jeffrey Coghlan
- Starring: Richard Hatch; Chloe Dykstra; Leah Cairns; Walter Koenig; Gigi Edgley; James Deen
- Cinematography: Ben Hoffman
- Edited by: Adrian Stewart
- Music by: Vitaliy Zavadskyy
- Production company: Flamboyance Films
- Distributed by: Lotus Entertainment
- Release date: April 20, 2018 (Sarasota)
- Running time: 105 minutes
- Country: United States
- Language: English

Diminuendo is a 2018 drama film directed by Adrian Stewart and written by Sarah Goldberger and Bryn Pryor. The film had its world premiere at the Sarasota Film Festival on April 20, 2018. Diminuendo is Stewart's first feature film.

Set in the near future, the film stars Richard Hatch as a director who becomes obsessed with a lifelike robot that replicates his girlfriend who killed herself nine years earlier. The film also stars Chloe Dykstra, Leah Cairns, Walter Koenig, Gigi Edgley and James Deen.

== Production ==
Sarah Goldberger and Bryn Pryor began writing the script for Diminuendo in late 2014. A departure from the heroic roles normally played by Hatch, the script was written specifically for him to play a darker, more flawed character.

The 18-day shoot began on August 14, 2016 with a break of several days over the Labor Day holiday. During that weekend, both Hatch and Edgley appeared as guests at 2016 DragonCon where they showed a teaser for the film and did a promotional Q&A. This was the first public screening of footage from the film.

Filming wrapped in late September 2016, but post-production was hampered by lack of money. An investor pulled out during shooting, and it took the producers nearly a year to replace the missing funding.

== Plot ==
Haskell and The Doll

Set in the year 2025, the film stars Richard Hatch as Haskell Edwards, a film director who has struggled with drug and alcohol abuse since the suicide of his girlfriend, Cello Shea (Dykstra) nine years earlier. Edwards is offered the chance to direct the story of Cello's life in a biopic being produced by LifeForm, a company which makes unintelligent, but utterly lifelike, "LifeDolls" of various celebrities. The film will star their LifeDoll of Cello, and as Haskell sets to the work of re-living his past to make the film, he becomes ever more obsessed with the machine, believing it to contain the real Cello's spirit.

The film touches on themes of loss, love, obsession and redemption.

== Narrative structure ==
Stewart has discussed his desire for Haskell Edwards to be seen as an unreliable narrator. With much of the film told in flashback, Stewart utilizes a novel technique of inter-cutting scenes from the film Haskell is making with the moment from his life represented by that scene (as Haskell remembers it). The final effect is to create two completely disparate, and conflicting responses in the audience as they lose track of what is "real" (in the context of the film) and what is fiction.

== Cast ==
- Richard Hatch as Haskell Edwards, an emotionally broken filmmaker.
- Chloe Dykstra as Cello Shea, the free-spirited young actress Haskell loved, and Number 8, the "LifeDoll" that plays Cello.
- Leah Cairns as Adrianna Sloane, a powerful Hollywood producer and Haskell's ex-wife.
- Walter Koenig as Milton Green, Haskell's longtime friend and manager.
- Gigi Edgley as Lauren Field, Haskell's current, long-suffering girlfriend.
- James Deen as Richard Ballantyne, a callous, egotistical, emotionally-abusive movie star.

== Richard Hatch's final film ==
Unbeknownst to himself or the production, Hatch had stage 4 pancreatic cancer at the time of filming. He told Stewart he was ill at the beginning of 2017, and the production began rushing a rough cut together for Hatch to see. The actor was able to view the film before his death on February 7, 2017. A memorial screening of the film's rough cut was organized in Hatch's honor, with many actors and crew from several previous projects attending.

At the 2017 San Diego Comic-Con, Chloe Dykstra, Walter Koenig, Gigi Edgley, Adrian Stewart, Bryn Pryor and Sarah Goldberger appeared on a panel dedicated to Hatch's life and his final role, moderated by Taliesin Jaffe, which was the first public screening of finished footage from the film.

The film is dedicated to the actor, with the legend "In Loving Memory of Our Good Friend Richard Hatch" appearing at the beginning of the end titles.
