= Cylk Cozart =

American actor

- Born: Calvin Cylk Cozart; February 1, 1957 (age 69); Knoxville, Tennessee, U.S.
- Occupations: Actor, director, writer, producer
- Years active: 1982–present

Calvin Cylk Cozart (born February 1, 1957) is an American actor, director, writer, and producer who has appeared in over 30 films and 20 television shows.

== Early life ==
Cozart was born and raised in Knoxville, Tennessee. His father is African American and his mother is Cherokee.

In his high school years, he was a talented football and basketball player. He attended Montreat-Anderson College, in Montreat, North Carolina, for his freshman year, then transferred to King College in Bristol, Tennessee, on a basketball scholarship.

== Career ==
After college, Cozart almost made a professional career out of basketball, but he suffered a foot injury in the NBA's Summer Pro League in Los Angeles, California. A demonstration of his basketball skills can be seen in the film White Men Can't Jump, which also starred actors Wesley Snipes and Woody Harrelson.

Prior to becoming an actor, Cozart was a frequent model working in Miami, Florida.

Some of his most prominent roles are Detective Jimmy Mulvey opposite Bruce Willis in 16 Blocks, Eagle Eye, and the family feature film, Adrift.

Cozart co-created and produced, "Spirit of Life", for the 2000 Summer Paralympic Games in Sydney, Australia. "Spirit of Life" earned a Videographer Award, Aurora Award, NY Film Festival Bronze Award, and Telly Award. Cozart is the Director of Entertainment/Education for his foundation, Keeping Dreams Alive, which focuses on mentoring children and teenagers from junior high school through College. “Our Foundation is for all sports. KDA will help find Scholarships for the kids that have fallen through the cracks of life."

== Filmography ==
=== Film ===
Year	Title	Role	Notes
1983	Blue Skies Again	Alvin 'Wallstreet' Chandler	
1988	School Daze	Big Brother/Dr. Feelgood	
1989	Hell High	Wide Receiver	
1990	Fire Birds	Dewar Proctor	
1991	Hot Shots!	Drill Sergeant #1	
1991	Ricochet	Reporter	
1991	Heaven Is a Playground	Andre	
1992	Dead On: Relentless II	Detective at Precinct	Video
1992	White Men Can't Jump	Robert	
1993	In the Line of Fire	Agent Cozart	
1994	Blue Chips	'Slick'	
1994	Love Affair	Dr. Punch	
1995	A Family Divided	–	TV movie
1995	Murder Was the Case	Paramedic #1	Video
1995	Slam Dunk Ernest	Barry Worth	TV movie
1996	Soul of the Game	Zo Perry	TV movie
1996	Eraser	Darryl	
1996	Reggie's Prayer	Coach Bobby Fess	
1996	Second Chance	Brad	Video
1997	Conspiracy Theory	Agent Lowry	
1999	Johnny Tsunami	Sergeant Sterling	TV movie
1999	Three to Tango	Kevin Cartwright	
1999	Play It to the Bone	Rudy	
2000	Cursed Part 3	–	Short
2002	Yo Alien	Ross Tanner	
2003	King of the Ants	Perks	
2005	The Helix...Loaded	The Orafice	
2006	16 Blocks	Detective Jimmy Mulvey	
2006	Cattle Call	Man on the Street	
2007	Steam	William	
2008	Eagle Eye	Sectran Courier	
2009	Benny Bliss and the Disciples of Greatness	Man at Store #2	
2011	Inch of Grace	Donnie	Short
2012	The Last Goodbye	Logan	Short
2014	A Fine Step	Veterinarian	
2015	Adrift	Clarence	
2017	The Last Movie Star	Hotel Manager	
2018	Silver Dollar Fish	The Traveler	
2019	The 3	Pastor Reichart	
2019	Drama Drama	Mr. Trewgy	

=== Television ===
Year	Title	Role	Notes
1987	227	Bailiff	Episode: "The Handwriting on the Wall"
1988	Bustin' Loose	Arlando	Episode: "Doo Wop"
1988	Amen	Young Groom	Episode: "Wedding Bell Blues"
1989	Hunter	Mitchell Chadwick	Episode: "Investment in Death"
1990	Saved by the Bell	Lieutenant Chet Adams	Episode: "Zack's War"
1990	Dream On	Drew Barnett	Episode: "Doing the Bossa Nova"
1991	Gabriel's Fire	Bus Boy	Episode: "The Great Waldo"
1992–93	Hangin' with Mr. Cooper	Quentin Tarver	Recurring Cast: Season 1
1993	Roc	Rob	Episode: "Time to Move On"
1993	Reasonable Doubts	Dr. Gilbert Lewis	Recurring Cast: Season 2
1993	Living Single	Brad Hamilton	Episode: "Judging by the Cover"
1993	Thea	Reggie	Episode: "Artie's Party"
1993	Walker, Texas Ranger	Axel Tate	Episode: "End Run"
1993	The Fresh Prince of Bel-Air	Hank Farley	Episode: "You've Got to Be a Football Hero"
1994	M.A.N.T.I.S.	Spencer Perry	Episode: "To Prey in Darkness"
1996	Ned and Stacey	Doug	Episode: "Paranoia on the 47th Floor"
1996	Diagnosis Murder	Lieutenant Bill Abrams	Episode: "35 Millimeter Murder"
1996	Sister, Sister	Dr. Gordon	Episode: "Kid-Napped"
1999	Any Day Now	–	Episode: "Eyes Wide Open"
2000	Chicken Soup for the Soul	Shane	Episode: "A Reason for Being"
2002	American Family	–	Episode: "Pilot"
2005	Over There	–	Episode: "Follow the Money"
2021	Knight's End	Kaleb	Episode: "Veritatis"
