= Chloe Dykstra =

American cosplayer, model and actress (born 1988)

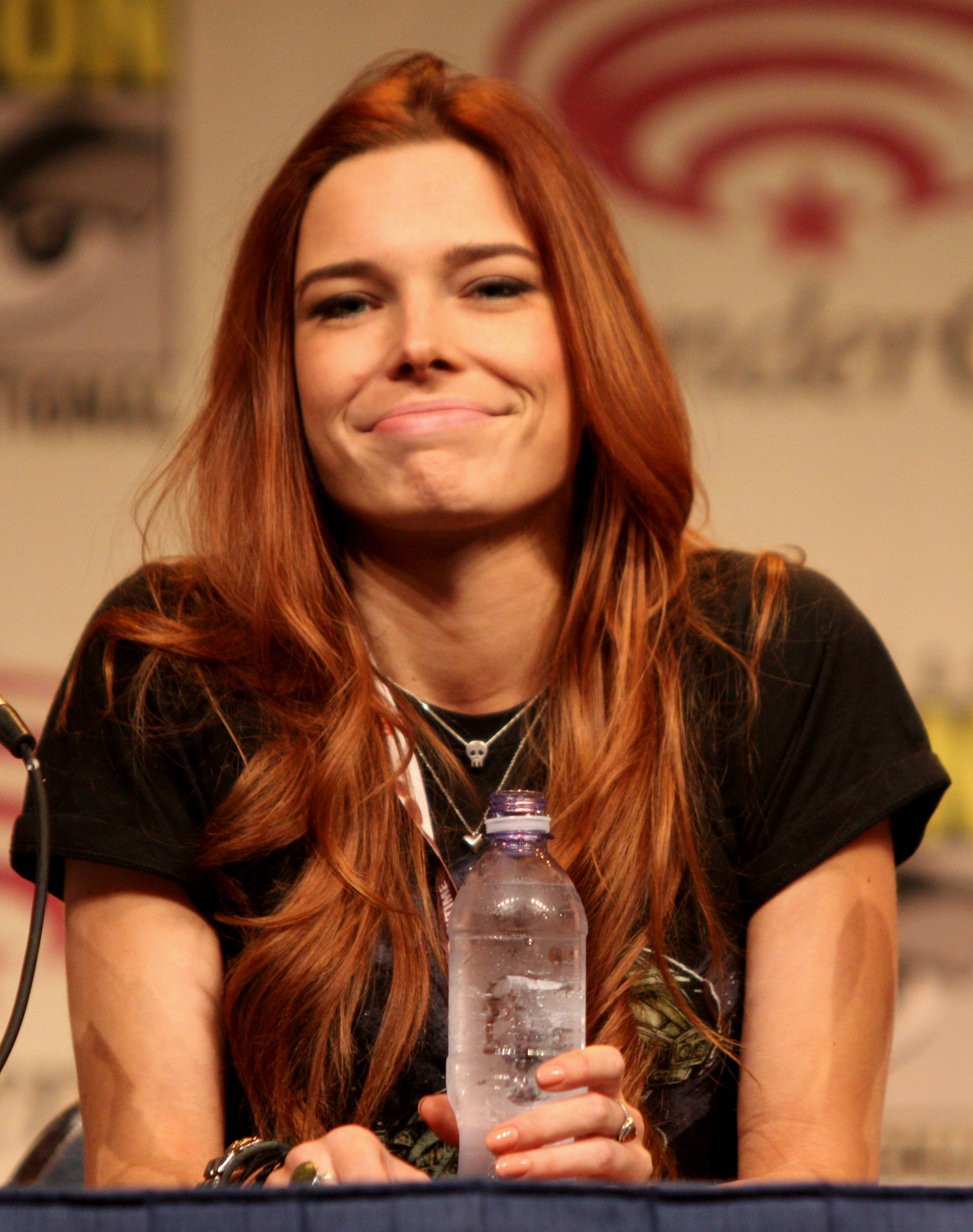
- Dykstra speaking at Wondercon 2012 in Anaheim, California.
- Born: Chloe Frances Dykstra; September 15, 1988 (age 38); Los Angeles, California, U.S.
- Occupations: Film, television, podcast
- Years active: 2001–present
- Known for: Heroes of Cosplay (2013)
- Father: John Dykstra

Chloe Frances Dykstra (born September 15, 1988) is an American cosplayer, model and actress. She produced and co-hosted the web series Just Cos for the Nerdist Industries' YouTube channel and is a cast member of the SYFY show Heroes of Cosplay. She is also a freelance game journalist for several websites. In June 2018, Dykstra received media attention following an article she wrote on Medium detailing her alleged abuse from a former partner, subsequently identified as Chris Hardwick.

== Early life ==
Dykstra was born in Los Angeles, California, and is the daughter of American special effects artist John Dykstra.

== Cosplay ==
Long before joining the team of cosplayers in Heroes of Cosplay, Chloe Dykstra made and exhibited a variety of cosplay characters. Characters include video game characters such as Lara Croft from Tomb Raider, Aela the Huntress from The Elder Scrolls V: Skyrim, GLaDOS from Portal and Elizabeth from BioShock. She has also cosplayed as a steampunk avatar from Minecraft, Doctor Who's Clara Oswald, and fem 11th Doctor. She also played the role of Triple H in a YouTube video by Max Landis called "Wrestling Isn't Wrestling". Dykstra produced and co-hosted the Nerdist Industries cosplay focused web series Just Cos.

Dykstra was featured in a Daily Dot article for her parody photo essay of Me In My Place pin-up blog photos.

== Acting ==
Dykstra appeared in the 2002 film Spider-Man as a passenger on a gondola, and its 2004 sequel, Spider-Man 2 as a passenger on the train. She had her first major acting role starring as Cello Shea in the film Diminuendo opposite Battlestar Galactica star Richard Hatch. In 2018, she starred in the lead role of Jerrica Benton/Jem in a fan film based on the 1985-1988 animated series Jem titled "TRULY OUTRAGEOUS: A Jem Fan Film!" that premiered exclusively on YouTube.

In July 2021, Dykstra played the role of Mrs. O’Hara in the music video for "Holier than Thou", a Metallica cover song by the punk band Off!.

== Personal life ==
In a June 2018 article on Medium, Dykstra alleged that she had been subjected to emotional and sexual abuse by a former partner for three years. She also said that, on leaving the relationship, she was blacklisted by her former partner and as a result was denied employment opportunities. Dykstra did not name her abusive former partner, but other media outlets used descriptive and timeline information from her article to conclude that it was Chris Hardwick, including the abuser being nearly 20 years her senior (Hardwick is nearly 17 years older).

Hardwick has denied Dykstra's allegations, saying, "Our three year relationship was not perfect—we were ultimately not a good match and argued—even shouted at each other—but I loved her, and did my best to uplift and support her as a partner and companion in any way and at no time did I sexually assault her." Three former girlfriends and his wife all say that Hardwick has never been abusive with them.

On July 26, 2018, Dykstra issued a statement via her Twitter account that she now intended to move on with her life. In that statement she also noted that she had declined to participate in the investigation being undertaken by the organization that had employed her alleged abuser, explaining in a later tweet that participating in that investigation would have exposed her to risk(s) beyond her control. As before, she declined to name either her alleged abuser or the organization for which he worked, but reports from the entertainment news media on Dykstra's statement also noted that Chris Hardwick had been reinstated as the host of AMC's Talking Dead television show.

"I have been adamant since I came forward with my essay that I never set out to ruin the career of the person I spoke about," Dykstra wrote. "I could have provided more details on the matter but chose not to. I have said what I wanted to say on the matter and I wish to move on with my life."
