= Showdown at Area 51 =

- Directed by: C. Roma
- Written by: Brook Durham; Ari Graham; Kevin Moore
- Produced by: Kenneth M. Badish
- Starring: Jason London; Gigi Edgley
- Cinematography: Chris Benson
- Edited by: Garry M.B. Smith
- Music by: John Dickson
- Production company: Nu Image Films
- Distributed by: First Look International
- Release date: December 15, 2007
- Running time: 96 minutes
- Country: United States
- Language: English
- Budget: $700,000

Showdown at Area 51 is a 2007 Sci-Fi TV film directed by C. Roma and starring Jason London and Gigi Edgley. The screenplay concerns two aliens that crash on Earth.

== Premise ==
Two aliens chasing each other crash on Earth and involve humans in their struggle.

== Cast ==
As appearing in screen credits (main roles identified):

- Jason London as Jake Townsend
- Gigi Edgley as Monica Gray
- Christa Campbell as Charlie Weise
- Coby Bell as Jude
- Jahidi White as Kronnan
- Mel Fair as Tate
- Brock Roberts as Major 12 OP 1
- Lee Horsley as Joe "Diamond Joe" Carson
- Kip Martin as Alex Townsend
- Tom Lowell as Ranger #1
- Michelle Anselmo as TV Reporter
- Natalie Matias as Quintana, Jude's Wife
- Olivia Clift as Little Girl On Swing
- Lorraine Clarkson as Female Driver
- Dan Gartner as Porch Onlooker
