= Leah Cairns =

Canadian actress (born 1974)

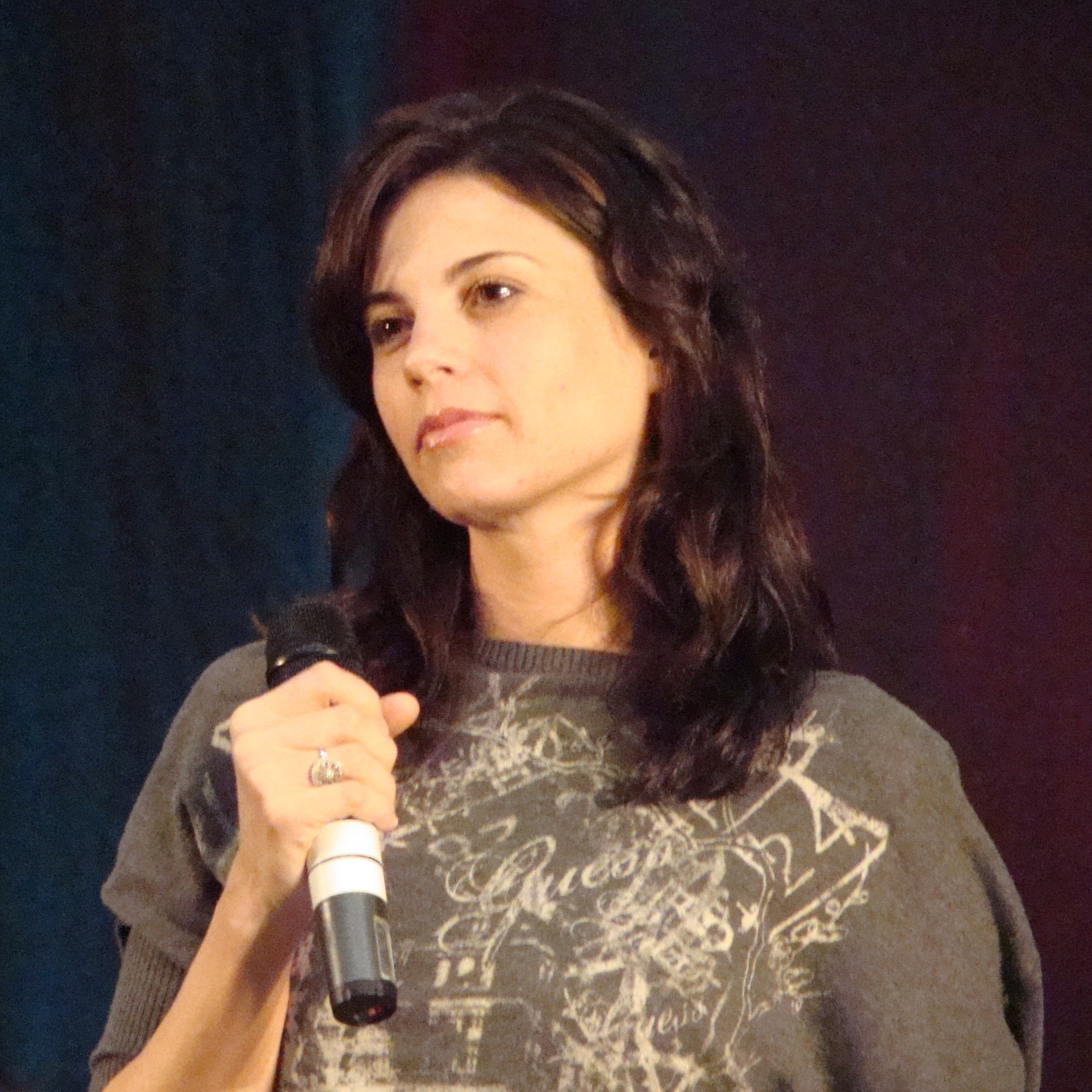
- Cairns in November 2009
- Born: June 2, 1974 (age 52); North Vancouver, British Columbia, Canada
- Years active: 2002–2021
- Spouse: Kevin Hawryluk

Leah Cairns (born June 2, 1974) is a Canadian former actress. She is best known for her roles as Lieutenant Margaret "Racetrack" Edmondson in Battlestar Galactica and as Kathryn MacLaren in the TV series Travelers. She last appeared in Brand New Cherry Flavor, a 2021 miniseries.

== Early life ==
Cairns was born in North Vancouver, British Columbia, and grew up in Kamloops.

== Career ==
Cairns appeared in Robson Arms before winning a recurring role as Jenna in Godiva's, for which she received a Leo Award nomination in 2006 for Best Supporting Performance by a Female in a Dramatic Series. Joining the Battlestar cast as Raptor pilot/ECO Racetrack at the end of season one, her performance impressed showrunners and Racetrack became a recurring character for the rest of the show. During BSG's season three Cairns also played Emily Hollander on the ABC Family series Kyle XY and appeared in Sanctuary. On the silver screen, she appeared in 88 Minutes and played Lois in Interstellar. In 2018, she co-starred in the film Diminuendo opposite Richard Hatch, her friend from the BSG reboot.

Cairns had a recurring role as Kathryn "Kat" MacLaren for the three seasons (2016–2018) of the series Travelers.

== Filmography ==
=== Film ===
Year	Title	Role	Notes
2003	The Mall Man	Sharon	Short
2005	Thralls	Leslie Harper	
2007	88 Minutes	Sara Pollard	
2007	Kickin' It Old Skool	Woman at Table	
2007	Coffee Diva	Celebrity Girl	Short
2009	Helen	Susanna	
2014	Interstellar	Lois	
2014	Lead and Follow	Amy	Short
2018	Diminuendo	Adrianna Sloane	
2019	Beyond the Call	Faith	Short

=== Television ===
Year	Title	Role	Notes
2002	The Chris Isaak Show	Girlfriend #1	Episode: "Mysterious Hearts"
2003	Tru Calling	Julie Spence	Episode: "Morning After"
2004	The Reality of Love	Mindy	TV movie
2004	Deep Evil	Woman in Airlock	TV movie
2005	Saving Milly	Senator's Aide	TV movie
2005	Robson Arms	Tessa	2 episodes
2005–06	Godiva's	Jenna	Main cast
2005–2009	Battlestar Galactica	Lt. Margaret 'Racetrack' Edmondson	Recurring role (seasons 1–4)
2006	Saved	Natalie	Episode: "Living Dead"
2006	Supernatural	Julie Hudson	Episode: "Crossroad Blues"
2007	Sanctuary	Tatha	Miniseries
2007–08	Kyle XY	Emily Hollander	Recurring role (season 2)
2008	Sanctuary	Tatha	Episode: "Fata Morgana"
2008–09	Battlestar Galactica: The Face of the Enemy	Lt. Margaret 'Racetrack' Edmondson	Miniseries
2011	Mega Cyclone	Andrea Newmar	TV movie
2014	The Tomorrow People	Lucy	Episode: "The Citadel"
2014	Fargo	Rachel Ziskind	Episode: "The Rooster Prince"
2014	Cedar Cove	Katie	2 episodes
2014	Along Came a Nanny	Lizzie Bannerman	TV movie
2015	Motive	Nina Hillridge	Episode: "Fallen"
2015	Coded	Carly	Episode: "Not My Kids"
2016	The Wildings	Anna Reddings	TV movie
2016–2018	Travelers	Kathryn McLaren	Recurring role
2017	Dead Over Heels: An Aurora Teagarden Mystery	Bess Burns	TV movie
2017	Deadly Sorority	Det. Lopez	TV movie
2017	Bates Motel	Woman	Episode: "The Cord"
2018	Past Malice: An Emma Fielding Mystery	Eleanor	TV movie
2018	Supernatural	Sasha Rawlings	Episode: "Nightmare Logic"
2018	Darrow & Darrow: In the Key of Murder	Norah	TV movie
2021	Brand New Cherry Flavor	Veronica Burke	Miniseries, 3 episodes
