= Second Chance (1996 film) =

- Directed by: Lyman Dayton
- Written by: Lyman Dayton. Robert Paxton.
- Produced by: Merrill B. Jenson
- Starring: Richard Hatch; Cylk Cozart; George LePorte; Nicholas Walker; Arte Johnson; Michael Becker; Ryan Peterson; Zachary Ellington
- Cinematography: Carlos Montaner
- Music by: Merrill B. Jenson
- Release date: 1996
- Running time: 82 minutes
- Country: United States
- Language: English

Second Chance is a 1996 American comedy science fiction film directed by Lyman Dayton.

== Plot ==
Three scientists invent a youth serum, but they're forced to flee their lab as a group of mercenaries try to take it for the wealthy old man who hired them, capturing the head of the lab in the process. While hiding, they take some of their own serum to become twenty years old again, but because of a faulty dosage they end up as six years old. In need of the antidote, they face the task of getting back into the lab in the bodies of first graders.

== Cast ==
- Richard Hatch as Mitch
- Cylk Cozart as Brad
- George LePorte as Stan
- Nicholas Walker as Nelson Stafford
- Arte Johnson as Dr. Josef Stiggens
- Michael Becker as Little Mitch
- Ryan Peterson as Little Stan
- Zachary Ellington as Little Brad

== Others names ==
The movie was named differently in the following languages.

- France : Une découverte dangereuse
- Germany : Second Chance - Alles auf Anfang
- Hungary : Végső esély
- Italy : Ragazzi ci siamo ristretti
