= Gigi Edgley =

Australian actress

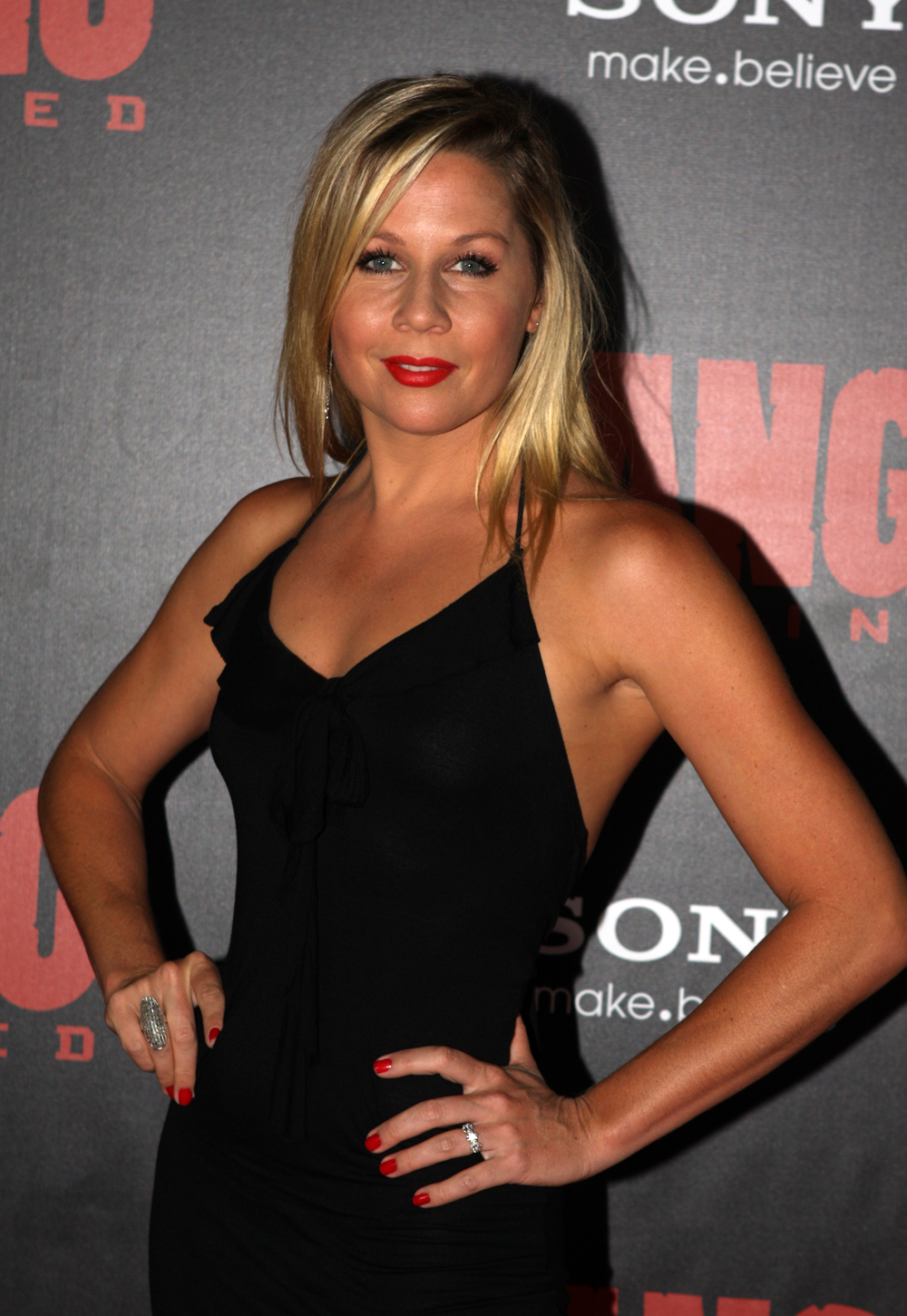
- Edgley in January 2013
- Born: 16 November 1977 (age 48); Perth, Australia
- Education: Queensland University of Technology (BA)
- Occupations: Actress; singer; songwriter
- Years active: 1998–present
- Height: 1.67 m (5 ft 6 in)
- Children: 1
- Website: gigiedgley.com

Gigi Edgley (born 16 November 1977) is an Australian actress, singer, and songwriter. She is best known for her portrayal of Chiana on the science fiction series Farscape.

== Early life ==
Edgley was born in Perth. She is the daughter of theatre, concert, and circus promoter Michael Edgley, known for bringing the Moscow State Circus to Australia during the 1980s. Her mother, Jeni Edgley, was formerly involved in managing a 250-acre (101 hectare) health retreat. As a child, Edgley performed both in and out of school. She also took several years of ballet, jazz, and character dance. She became interested primarily in acting and had her first professional theatrical engagement at the Twelfth Night Theatre. She earned a Bachelor of Arts degree from the Queensland University of Technology in 1998. Edgley is proficient in ballet, jazz, character dance, singing, and martial arts. Her signature skill is fire-twirling.

== Career ==
=== Acting ===
Edgley's early television and film work included several independent productions with later Farscape co-star Anthony Simcoe, as well as a guest spot on the Australian series Water Rats and a role in the film The Day of the Roses.

Edgley is best known for her role as Chiana in the science fiction series Farscape. Originally hired for a single episode, her character was supposed to die at the end of her debut appearance in "Durka Returns". Her performance impressed the creators so much they decided to retain her for the remainder of the series. At the beginning of the second season, she was promoted to a regular and added to the opening credits. She appeared in a total of 68 episodes of the series.

During her time on Farscape Edgley also appeared in other roles on television, including in the internationally aired series The Lost World and BeastMaster. She has undertaken some independent film work, and voiced a character in an audio drama for Seeing Ear Theatre.

After Farscape was cancelled, Edgley pursued other projects including a role in the Australian drama telefilm BlackJack with Colin Friels. She joined the cast of the Australian drama series The Secret Life of Us and Stingers. In 2004 Edgley reprised her role as Chiana in the miniseries Farscape: The Peacekeeper Wars, which wrapped up the series' storylines after its cancellation.

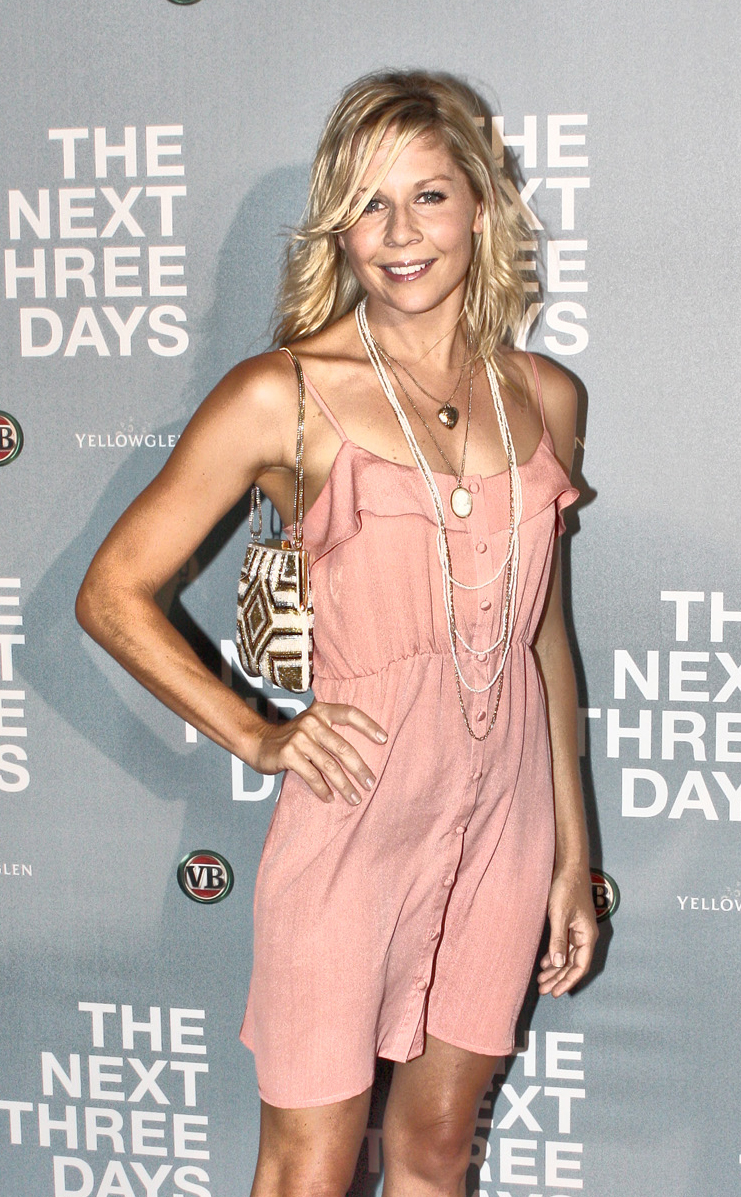
Edgley in January 2011

In 2006 she starred as the female lead in the Australian thriller film Last Train to Freo. Her role earned her a nomination for Best Actress in a Lead Role by the Film Critics Circle of Australia. She also had a minor supporting role in the 2007 USA Network TV miniseries The Starter Wife. She had a leading role in three seasons of Rescue: Special Ops. In 2018, she appeared in the film Diminuendo opposite Richard Hatch.

In 2022, Edgley appeared as Meredith Knight in the Australian drama film Everything in Between, portraying an enmeshed mother grappling with her son's mental health crisis. FilmInk praised her performance, noting Edgley was “excellent as the fretting mum”.

She frequently appears at science fiction conventions and gives interviews to many magazines and radio stations around the world.

=== Music ===
Edgley recorded a music single titled "Poison" with recording artist n8. The song is available for download on her webpage in the music section. She also appeared in a music video for the song "When You Get to California" (2004) by Australian rock group Hoodoo Gurus.

In July 2007, Edgley began recording with Seattle-based artist/producer Kyle Stevens and writing songs for a new music release. At Farscape Con in November 2007, Gigi released "...SO IT SEEMS", a five-song E.P. produced and co-written with Kyle. Edgley has recorded other songs including Fall, Ftang!, and Blue Sky Thoughts.

=== Other appearances and achievements ===
Edgley was featured in several printed magazines. Most notably, she appeared nude in the February 2001 issue of Australian magazine Black+White. She was also on the cover of the FHM magazine in December 2003 and the US version of TV Guide (29 July – 4 August 2000 issue).

Edgley was Yen Magazine's ambassador for the 2006 Pantene Young Woman of the Year Awards.

== Personal life ==
Edgley married Jamey Mossengren in 2012. They divorced in 2017. She married Jed Luczynski in 2018. They have a daughter.

== Filmography ==
=== Film ===
Year	Title	Role	Notes
1998	The Bastard	Sara	Short film
2000	The Monkey's Mask	Tianna	
2006	Last Train to Freo	Lisa	
2007	Showdown at Area 51	Monica Gray	
2008	Newcastle	Sandra	
2008	Systolic	Liza	Short film
2009	Nobody Knows	Trixie Blu	
2013	One Step Ahead	Lisa	Short film
2013	L.O.V.E. Insurance for the Heart	Meredith	Short film
2015	Whiskey Sour	Emma	Short film
2015	Della Mortika	Zarah Della Morte	Short film, post-production
2015	Hashtag	X	Short film
2018	Diminuendo	Lauren	
2022	Everything in Between	Meredith Knight	

=== Television ===
Year	Title	Role	Notes
1998	The Day of the Roses	Erica Watson	TV miniseries
1999	Water Rats	Penny Lane	Episode "Red Light"
1999	BeastMaster	Maleena	Episode "Amazons"
1999–2003	Farscape	Chiana	Main role
2001	The Lost World	Pakim	Episode "The Guardian"
2002	BeastMaster	Talia	Episode "The Alliance"
2003	BlackJack: Murder Archive	Liz Kempson	TV film
2003	The Secret Life of Us	George	Regular role
2004	Stingers	Katherine Marks	Recurring role
2004	Farscape: The Peacekeeper Wars	Chiana	TV miniseries
2005	BlackJack: In the Money	Liz Kempson	TV film
2005	BlackJack: Ace Point Game	Liz Kempson	TV film
2006	BlackJack: At the Gates	Liz Kempson	TV film
2007	The Starter Wife	Chloe	TV miniseries
2007	BlackJack: Ghosts	Liz Kempson	TV film
2009–2011	Rescue: Special Ops	Lara Knight	Main role
2010	Quantum Apocalypse	Trish	TV film
2012	Tricky Business	Kate Christie	Main role
2014	Carlotta	Jane	TV film
2014	Jim Henson's Creature Shop Challenge	Herself	Host
2016	Star Trek Continues	Eliza Taylor	Fan-made series Episode: "Come Not Between the Dragons"

=== Video games ===
Year	Title	Role
2002	Farscape: The Game	Chiana (voice)
2022	High on Life	Additional Voices

== Music credits ==
- Vocal work on a single Poison by N8
- Starred in a video for When You Get To California by Hoodoo Gurus

== Awards and nominations ==
Year	Award	Category	Nominated work	Result
2001	Maxim Award	Sexiest Space Babe	Farscape	Won
2002	Saturn Awards	Best Supporting Actress in a Television Series	Farscape	Nominated
2003	SyFy Genre Award	Best Supporting Actress / Television	Farscape	Won
2006	Film Critics Circle of Australia Awards	Best Actress in a Motion Picture	Last Train to Freo	Nominated
