= James Deen =

American pornographic actor

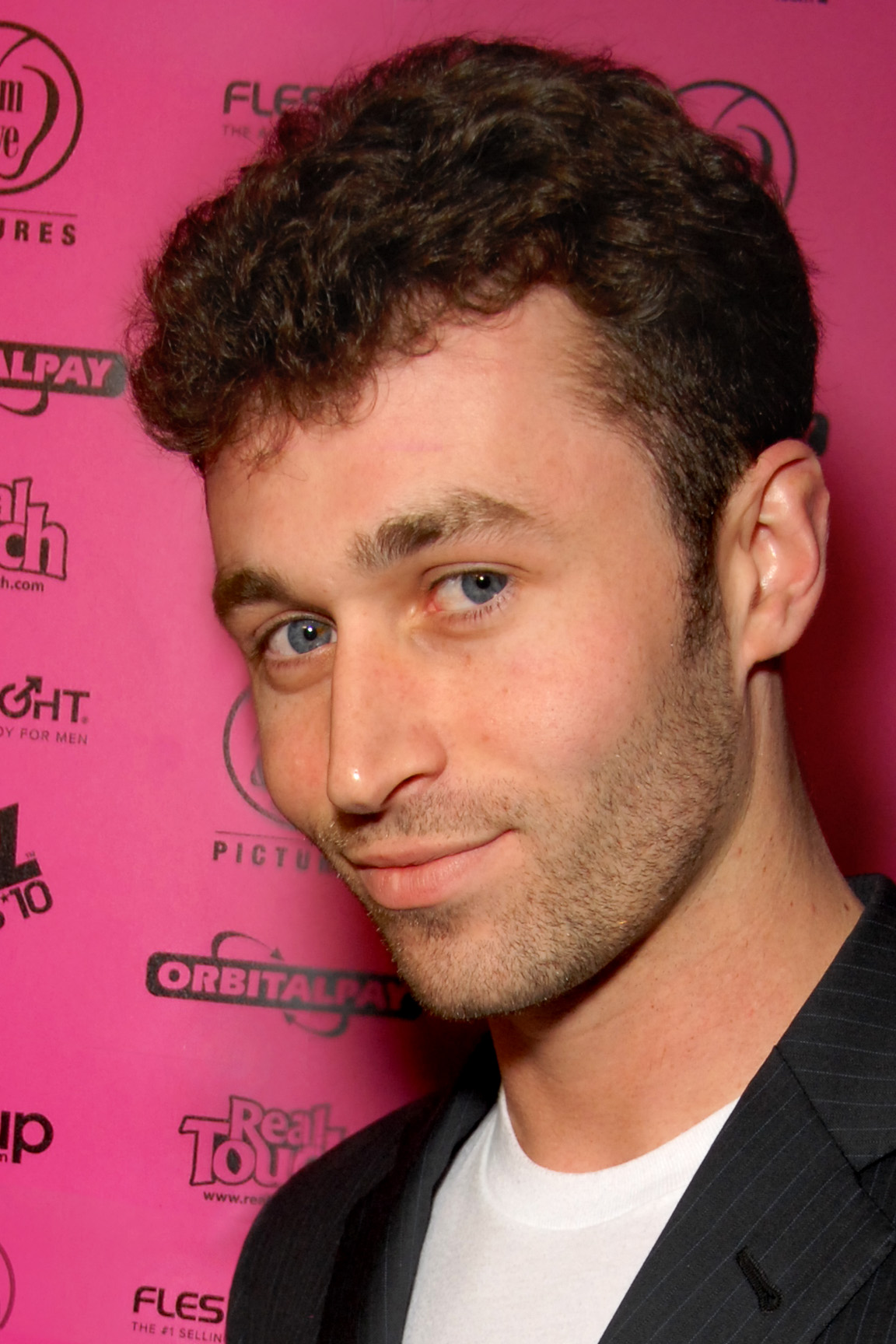
- Deen in 2010
- Born: Bryan Matthew Sevilla; 1985 or 1986 (age 40–41); Los Angeles County, California, U.S.
- Years active: 2004–present
- Height: 5 ft 8 in (1.73 m)
- Website: jamesdeen.com

Bryan Matthew Sevilla (born 1985 or 1986), known professionally by the stage name James Deen, is an American former pornographic actor and director.

Deen entered the porn industry in 2004 at the age of 18. He gained attention due to his relatively slender build, lack of tattoos, and everyman appeal, bucking the stereotypical image of hypermasculine male actors in the pornography industry. In late 2015, multiple women came forward with allegations of sexual misconduct, including rape, against Deen, with the most notable being his former girlfriend Joanna Angel.

== Early life ==
Deen was born in Los Angeles County, California, and raised in Pasadena. His father is a mechanical engineer, and his mother is a computer electronic engineer, and one of them worked at the Jet Propulsion Laboratory.

According to Deen, performing in pornographic films was his ambition since he was in kindergarten. Around age 15, he left high school and spent two years homeless. He graduated from La Cañada High School in 2004. At 17, Deen moved in with his father. He worked at a Starbucks for two years and took classes at Pasadena City College.

== Career ==
After entering the pornography industry in 2004, he initially worked with older female performers. In 2009, he was named the "Male Performer of the Year" by AVN at the age of 22, making him the youngest actor to have won this award. Deen has a fan following among teenage girls, a demographic typically not associated with the pornographic industry. In February 2012, Nightline aired the feature Porn's Boy Next Door, which included interviews with Deen and his fans. One fan described him as "the Ryan Gosling of porn".

In September 2012, Deen was a participant in a press conference, along with others opposing Los Angeles County Measure B, an initiative which would require condom usage in the pornographic film industry. Deen questioned the measure's constitutionality.

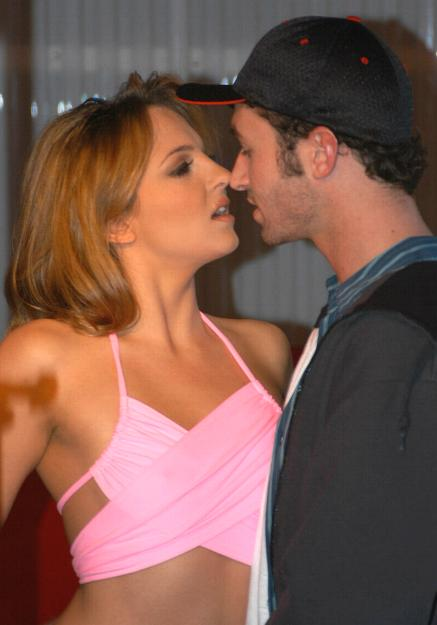
Deen on a film set in 2007

Deen's collaborations include work with pornographic site WoodRocket.com. As the host of original web series, James Deen Loves Food, Deen has been featured reviewing top restaurants, ordering every item on a drive-thru menu at once, and creating a $580 burrito.

In January 2013, Deen took to crowdfunding site Kickstarter.com to raise funds for the mainstream steampunk Western film Cowboys & Engines. Deen is listed as the producer of the Bryn Pryor vehicle. The campaign surpassed its goal of $100,000 in 58 days. Actors Malcolm McDowell, Richard Hatch and Walter Koenig had signed on to the project.

== In media ==
In February 2013, Deen was invited to return to his alma mater, Pasadena City College, by professor Hugo Schwyzer to speak to students about his career. The appearance, initially open to the public, was restricted by college administrators due to "public-safety concerns" over "protesters". Deen was restricted to speaking to the students of Pasadena City College's "Navigating Pornography" class. In April 2013, Deen delivered the keynote speech for the Sexual Health Fest at the University of Wisconsin–Madison.

Deen was featured in a July 2012 GQ multi-page article, chronicling his work and personal life. GQ interviewed Deen again for an article about his workout regimen, in which he credited healthy eating habits, a "Jew stomach", and performing strenuous sex acts on camera. In 2013, Deen was listed as the only male performer to make the CNBC Dirty Dozen list of the porn industry's popular stars.

In April 2013, Deen filmed a pornographic scene with reality television participant Farrah Abraham, who had been in one of the Teen Mom series. Deen indicated that he was asked to pretend to be dating Abraham as part of a ploy to market the scene as an accidentally released sex tape, but that he refused to do so, arguing, "If you're going to make a celebrity sex tape and try to pass it off as an amateur home video, you don't hire a well-known porn star!"

Deen co-starred with Lindsay Lohan in Paul Schrader's 2013 film The Canyons, written by Bret Easton Ellis. In July 2013, Deen teamed with American pornographic actress Andy San Dimas, adult app store MiKandi and adult industry news source XBIZ, to release the first adult video production recorded with Google Glass. Within 24 hours, the censored trailer reached one million views on YouTube.

Deen filmed a sex scene with Huffington Post blogger and comedian Jenn Tisdale in late 2013, in a New York City hotel room, after she responded to an open invitation by Deen on Twitter.

Deen has a sizable fan base; his fans, dubbed "Deenagers", have created social media fan pages on Tumblr, Pinterest and standalone fan sites. Deenagers regularly share and comment on Deen's work. In February 2013, Deen launched JamesDeenStore.com. In addition to Deen's films and adult novelties, the store features Deen's Baby Panda brand of clothing.

In January 2014, Deen joined the newly formed Adult Performer Advocacy Committee (APAC), which provides representation for performers within the adult film industry, protects performers' rights, reviews existing health and safety protocols, and initiates new ones as needed. As part of the committee's launch, APAC released a Porn 101 video. A DVD copy was released to all industry talent attending the recent Adult Entertainment Expo in Las Vegas, Nevada. Deen has served as Treasurer and served as Chairperson of APAC until December 2015, when he stepped down following accusations from fellow performers.

On June 25, 2014, Deen participated in a Reddit A.M.A. He received over 4,000 questions over the course of an hour, making Deen's AMA listed by Reddit as the most popular on the site as of the following morning.

== Personal life ==
From 2005 to 2011, Deen dated fellow pornography star Joanna Angel. In an interview with The Huffington Post from July 2013, porn actress Stoya stated that she was dating Deen. They dated from 2012 to 2014.

Deen is Jewish and identifies with Judaism as "a culture more than anything else." Deen identifies as a libertarian.

== Rape and sexual misconduct allegations ==
On November 28, 2015, Deen was publicly accused of rape by pornographic actress and writer Stoya, with whom he had had a previous relationship. She wrote in a tweet:

James Deen held me down and fucked me while I said no, stop, used my safeword. I just can't nod and smile when people bring him up anymore.

Deen denied the allegations, calling them "false and defamatory". Deen's former girlfriend Joanna Angel was one of the first performers to publicly support Stoya. On The Jason Ellis Show on Sirius XM, Angel alleged that Deen had been verbally and physically abusive during their six-year relationship.

In total, nine women came forward with allegations of abuse and unnecessarily rough sex during scenes. The allegations included claims that Deen forcibly had anal sex with a woman during a non-anal scene, that he physically restrained and hit several women, and forced one woman's face into his crotch to "sniff his testicles". Amber Rayne said that during a shoot, Deen punched her in the face and caused her anus to bleed with violent anal sex.

Following the allegations against him, Kink.com, Evil Angel, and HardX.com severed all ties with Deen, stating that "consent is sacrosanct". The Frisky cancelled Deen's sexual advice column and removed advertisements for and links to Deen's official site from previously published editions. Deen voluntarily resigned as chairman of the Adult Performer Advocacy Committee.

In December 2015, an article in The Daily Beast referred to Deen as the "Bill Cosby of porn", while the feminist site We Hunted the Mammoth wrote that James Deen seemed to be "a perfect example" of a missing stair. Deen later gave an interview to The Daily Beast where he stated he was "baffled" by the accusations and denied or offered counter-explanations for them.

In 2016, Deen and his production company faced a $77,875 fine for violating a California safety law by failing to provide condoms for performers, failing to disclose safety records, and other violations.

In July 2017, director Maria Demopoulos filed a lawsuit against Deen for blocking the distribution of a documentary that addresses the numerous rape and sexual assault allegations against him by stealing legal releases from her office.

Sociologist Chris Waugh argues that Deen's continued financial success and popularity in the face of severe allegations of sexual misconduct raises questions of accountability within the porn industry. Journalist Catriona Innes, writing in Cosmopolitan, argues that Deen's case represents the porn industry's insulation from the effects of the #MeToo movement.

== Awards ==
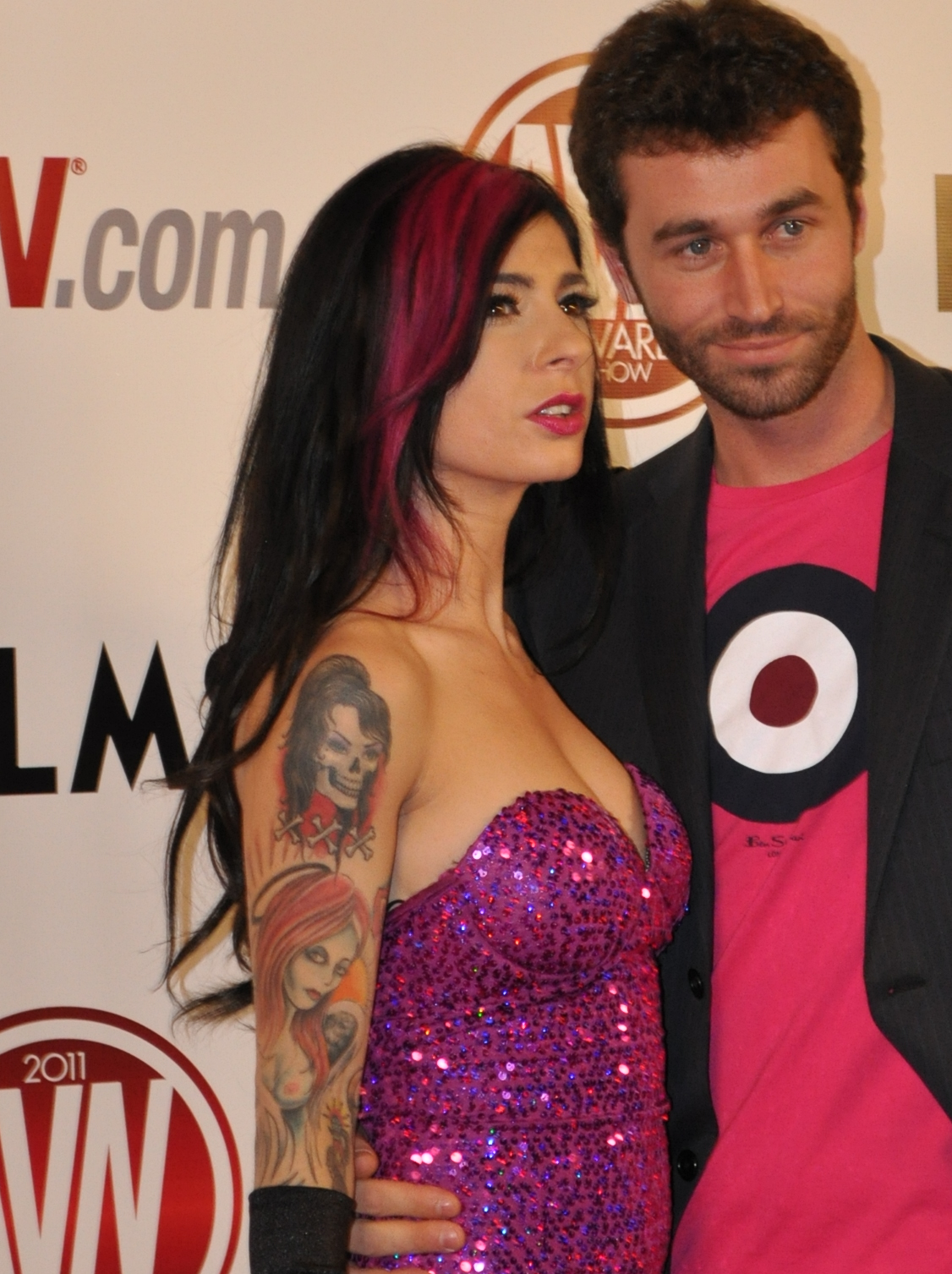
Deen with Joanna Angel at AVN Awards, 2011

James Deen awards and nominations
Awards and nominations
Award	Wins	Nominations
AVN Awards	13	0
XBIZ Awards	9	0
XRCO Awards	6	0
NightMoves Awards	3	0

Totals (Note: Certain award groups do not simply award one winner. They acknowledge several different recipients, have runners-up, and have third place. Since this is a specific recognition and is different from losing an award, runner-up mentions are considered wins in this award tally. For simplification and to avoid errors, each award in this list has been presumed to have had a prior nomination.)
- Wins: 31
- Nominations: 0

AVN Awards
Year	Award	Film	Result
2009	Male Performer of the Year	—N/a	Won
2013	Best Three-Way Sex Scene – Girl/Girl/Boy (with Asa Akira and Brooklyn Lee)	Asa Akira Is Insatiable 3	Won
2013	Crossover Star of the Year (tied with Sunny Leone)	—N/a	Won
2013	Male Performer of the Year	—N/a	Won
2014	Best Three-Way Sex Scene – Boy/Boy/Girl (with Anikka Albrite and Ramon Nomar)	Anikka	Won
2014	Mainstream Star of the Year	—N/a	Won
2014	Favorite Male Porn Star (Fan Award)	—N/a	Won
2015	Best Group Sex Scene (with A.J. Applegate, Erik Everhard, John Strong, Jon Jon, Mr. Pete, Mick Blue and Ramon Nomar)	Gangbang Me	Won
2015	Most Outrageous Sex Scene (with Adriana Chechik, Erik Everhard and Mick Blue)	Gangbang Me	Won
2015	Favorite Male Porn Star (Fan Award)	—N/a	Won
2015	Mainstream Star of the Year	—N/a	Won
2016	Best Double Penetration Sex Scene (with Erik Everhard and Riley Reid)	Being Riley	Won
2016	Best Group Sex Scene (with Erik Everhard, Keisha Grey, John Strong, Jon Jon and Mick Blue)	Gangbang Me 2	Won

NightMoves Awards
Year	Award	Result
2010	Best Male Performer (Editor's Choice)	Won
2012	Best Male Performer (Fan's Choice)	Won
2014	Best Male Performer (Editor's Choice)	Won

XBIZ Awards
Year	Award	Film	Result
2010	Male Performer of the Year	—N/a	Won
2013	Male Performer of the Year	—N/a	Won
2013	Crossover Star of the Year	—N/a	Won
2014	Male Performer of the Year	—N/a	Won
2014	Crossover Star of the Year	—N/a	Won
2014	Best Actor – Feature Movie	The New Behind the Green Door	Won
2015	Male Performer of the Year	—N/a	Won
2015	Best Scene – Non-Feature Release (with Adriana Chechik, Criss Strokes, Erik Everhard, John Strong and Mick Blue)	Gangbang Me	Won
2015	Best Scene – Vignette Release (with Ava Dalush)	I Love My Hot Wife	Won

XRCO Awards
Year	Award	Result
2008	Unsung Swordsman	Won
2008	Best On-Screen Chemistry (with Joanna Angel)	Won
2009	Male Performer of the Year	Won
2009	Best On-Screen Chemistry (with Joanna Angel)	Won
2013	Mainstream Adult Media Favorite	Won
2014	Mainstream Adult Media Favorite	Won
