= Jahidi White =

American basketball player (born 1976)

Jahadi White
Personal information
- Born: February 19, 1976 (age 50) St. Louis, Missouri, U.S.
- Listed height: 6 ft 9 in (2.06 m)
- Listed weight: 290 lb (132 kg)

Career information
- High school: Cardinal Ritter College Prep (St. Louis, Missouri)
- College: Georgetown (1994–1998)
- NBA draft: 1998: 2nd round, 43rd overall pick
- Drafted by: Washington Wizards
- Playing career: 1998–2005
- Position: Power forward / center
- Number: 55

Career history
- 1998–2003: Washington Wizards
- 2003–2004: Phoenix Suns
- 2004–2005: Charlotte Bobcats

Career highlights
- Third-team Parade All-American (1994)

Career NBA statistics
- Points: 1,954 (5.9 ppg)
- Rebounds: 1,944 (5.8 rpg)
- Blocks: 355 (1.1 bpg)
- Stats at NBA.com
- Stats at Basketball Reference

Jahidi White (born February 19, 1976) is an American former professional basketball player who played in the National Basketball Association (NBA) for seven seasons.

== Basketball career ==
Jahidi White attended high school at Cardinal Ritter College Prep. While at Ritter, White teamed with future Duke University player Chris Carrawell, and ex-NBA player Loren Woods. He subsequently attended and played basketball at Georgetown University, where he played with Allen Iverson and Othella Harrington, two other future NBA players. He was drafted in 1998 in the 2nd round (43rd overall) by the Washington Wizards.

In 2003, Washington traded White to the Phoenix Suns for Brevin Knight, and in the following season, he was selected by the Charlotte Bobcats in the expansion draft, and waived in February 2005. He was signed for 2006–2007 by the Cleveland Cavaliers, but was released during preseason. Injuries limited his playing time and mobility. During his career, he averaged 5.9 PPG, 1.1 BPG, 0.2 APG and 5.8 RPG.

After his playing career concluded, White discovered upon examining his birth certificate that he had been misspelling his first name throughout. He had been under the impression that his name was spelled Jahidi, when he had in fact been given the name Jahadi.

== Acting career ==
In 2007, White appeared in the Sci Fi Channel original movie Alien vs. Alien, aka Showdown at Area 51, playing a hulking alien warrior intent on destroying all life on Earth. He had no spoken lines in this film.

Nelly mentioned him at the end of his hit song St. Louie. Nelly also mentioned him in the St. Lunatics song "Who's the Boss" saying the Line "In the Center Like Jahidi" metaphorically referencing the position Jahidi played in basketball.
