= 2004 NBA expansion draft =

Player selection draft

General information
- Sport: Basketball
- Date: June 22, 2004

Overview
- League: NBA
- Expansion team: Charlotte Bobcats
- Expansion season: 2004–05

The expansion draft for the construction of the Charlotte Bobcats, recognized at the time as the 30th NBA franchise, was held on June 22, 2004. The Bobcats selected 19 players from other teams' unprotected players lists and constructed their squad for what was regarded at the time as their inaugural season.

This was the second time an expansion draft was held for a Charlotte NBA franchise. The first time was the 1988 NBA expansion draft held for the original Charlotte Hornets, who relocated to New Orleans after the 2002–03 season, becoming the New Orleans Hornets. The Bobcats would go on to acquire the history and name of the original Charlotte Hornets after the New Orleans Hornets renamed themselves the New Orleans Pelicans prior to the start of the 2013–14 season, with the Pelicans retaining the history of the New Orleans Hornets.

== Key ==
Pos.	G	F	C
Position	Guard	Forward	Center

^{+}	Denotes player who has been selected for at least one All-Star Game

== Selections ==
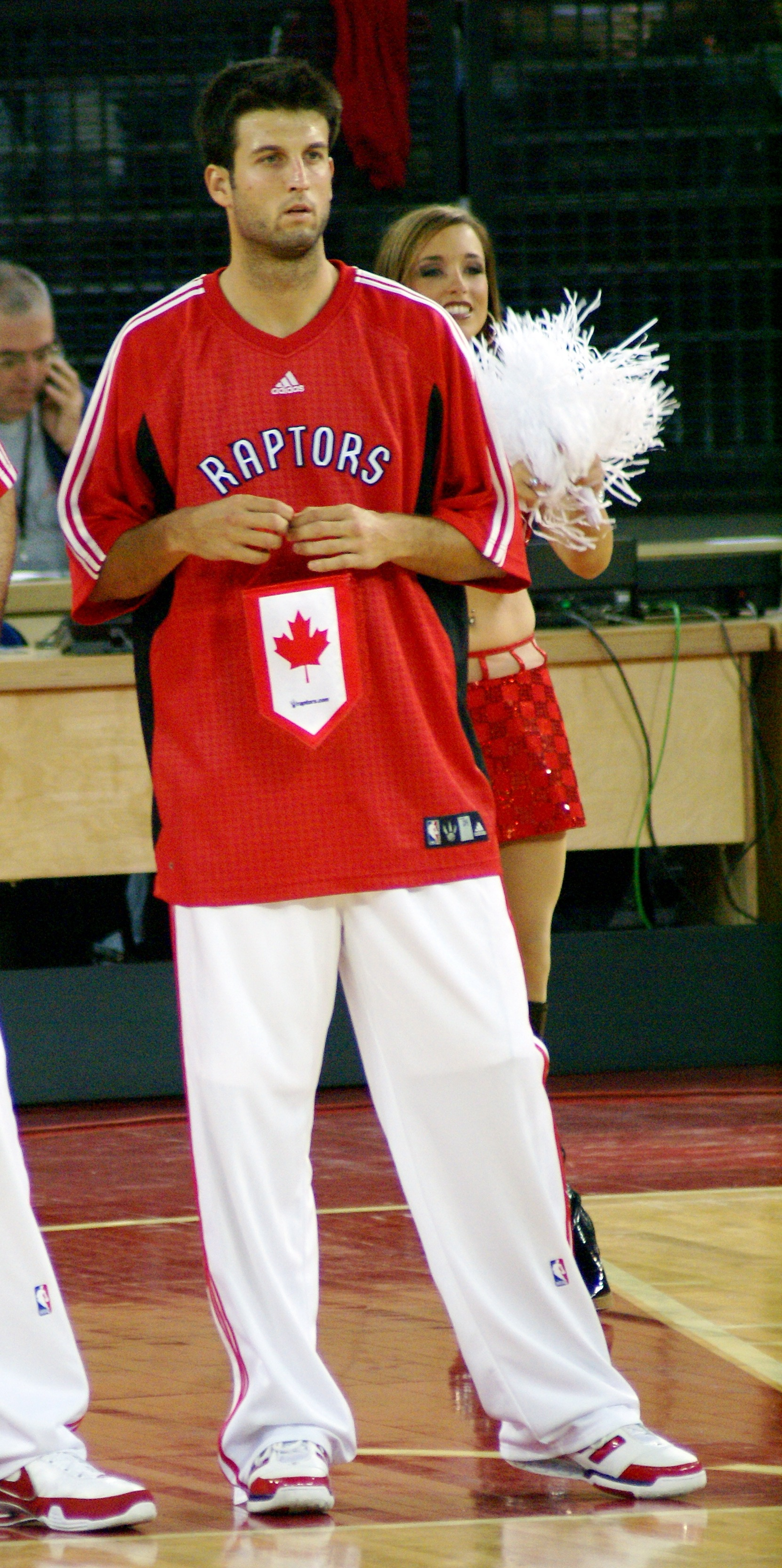
Jason Kapono was selected from the Cleveland Cavaliers.

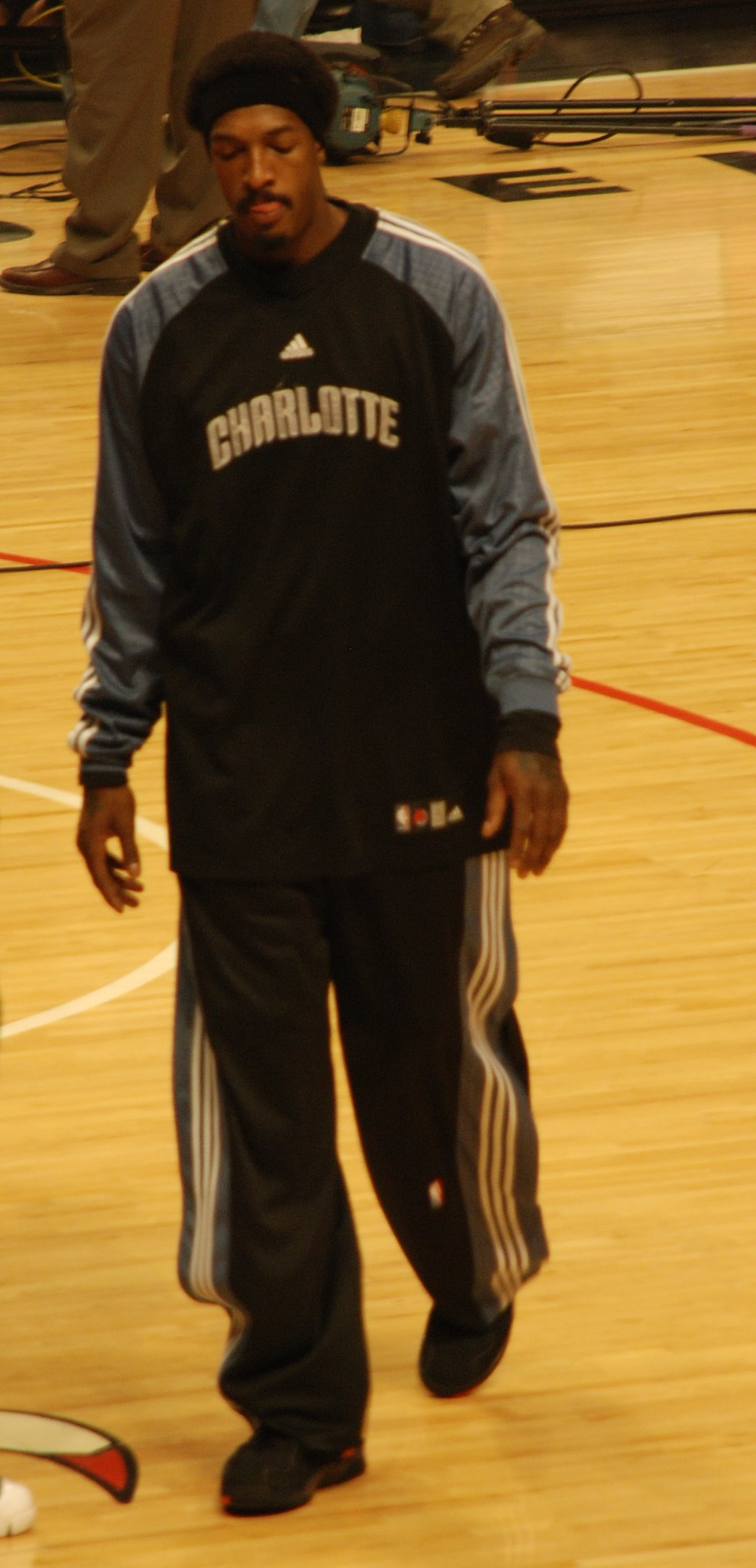
Gerald Wallace was selected from the Sacramento Kings. During his time with Charlotte, he led the league in steals in 2006 and was an All-Star in 2010 alongside being selected to the All-Defensive First Team.

Player	Pos.	Nationality	Previous team	Prior seasons in the NBA	Career with the Bobcats	Ref.
Lonny Baxter (Note: Denotes player who would be a restricted free agent in the 2004–2005 season. According to the expansion draft rules, a restricted free agent who was selected in the expansion draft would become an unrestricted free agent on July 1, 2004.)	F	United States	Washington Wizards	2	2006	
J. R. Bremer	G	Bosnia and Herzegovina (Note: J. R. Bremer was born in the United States, but became a naturalized Bosnia and Herzegovina citizen. He has represented Bosnia and Herzegovina national team.)	Golden State Warriors	2	—	
Primož Brezec	C	Slovenia	Indiana Pacers	3	2004–2007	
Maurice Carter	G	United States	New Orleans Hornets	1	—	
Predrag Drobnjak (Note: The Charlotte Bobcats acquired the second pick in the 2004 draft and agreed to select Predrag Drobnjak in the expansion draft from the Los Angeles Clippers in exchange for the fourth and 33rd picks in the 2004 Draft.)	C	Montenegro (Note: Predrag Drobnjak previously played for the Serbia and Montenegro national team, but has represented the Montenegro national team after Serbia and Montenegro dissolved in June 2006 into two independent countries.)	Los Angeles Clippers	3	—	
Desmond Ferguson	G/F	United States	Portland Trail Blazers	1	—	
Marcus Fizer	F	United States	Chicago Bulls	4	—	
Richie Frahm	G	United States	Seattle SuperSonics	1	—	
Brandon Hunter	F	United States	Boston Celtics	1	—	
Jason Kapono	F	United States	Cleveland Cavaliers	1	2004–2005	
Zaza Pachulia (Note: The Charlotte Bobcats traded Zaza Pachulia to the Milwaukee Bucks in exchange for the 45th pick in the 2004 Draft.)	C	Georgia	Orlando Magic	1	—	
Aleksandar Pavlović (Note: The Charlotte Bobcats traded Aleksandar Pavlović to the Cleveland Cavaliers in exchange for a lottery-protected first-round pick. This pick was ultimately executed as the #22 pick in the 2007 draft, with which the Bobcats selected Jared Dudley.)	G/F	Serbia (Note: Aleksandar Pavlović previously played for the Serbia and Montenegro national team, but has represented the Serbia national team after Serbia and Montenegro dissolved in June 2006 into two independent countries.)	Utah Jazz	1	—	
Jamal Sampson	F/C	United States	Los Angeles Lakers	2	2004–2005	
Tamar Slay	G	United States	New Jersey Nets	2	2004–2005	
Theron Smith	F	United States	Memphis Grizzlies	1	2004–2005	
Jeff Trepagnier	G	United States	Denver Nuggets	3	—	
Gerald Wallace^{+}	F	United States	Sacramento Kings	3	2004–2011	
Jahidi White (Note: The Charlotte Bobcats agreed to select Jahidi White from the Phoenix Suns in exchange for a future first-round pick and cash considerations.)	F/C	United States	Phoenix Suns	6	2004–2005	
Loren Woods	F/C	United States	Miami Heat	3	—	
