= Richard Hatch (actor) =

American actor (1945–2017)

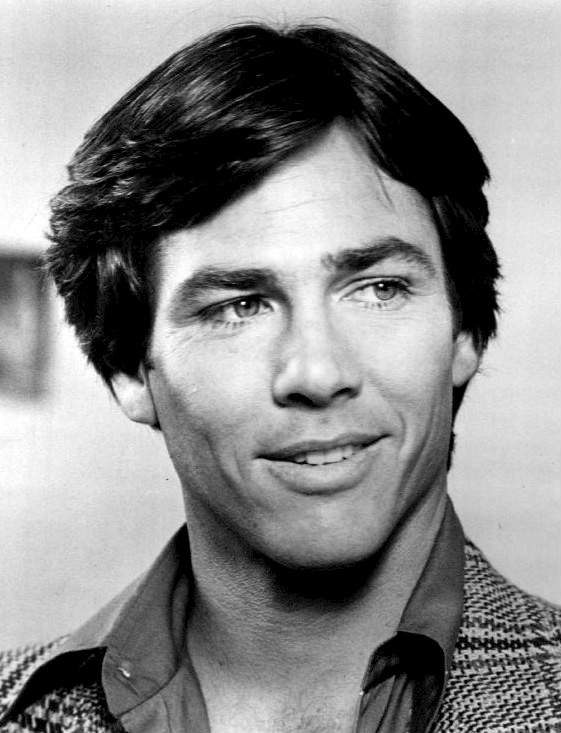
- Hatch in a publicity photo for The Streets of San Francisco (1977)
- Born: Richard Lawrence Hatch; May 21, 1945; Santa Monica, California, U.S.
- Died: February 7, 2017 (aged 71); Los Angeles, California, U.S.
- Occupations: Actor; writer; producer
- Years active: 1970–2017
- Known for: Battlestar Galactica; The Streets of San Francisco; All My Children; Battlestar Galactica (2004 TV series)
- Spouse: Jo Marie Distante
- Children: 1
- Website: richardhatch.com

Richard Lawrence Hatch (May 21, 1945 – February 7, 2017) was an American actor and writer. He began his career as a stage actor before moving on to television work in the 1970s. Hatch is best known for his roles as Captain Apollo in the original Battlestar Galactica television series and Tom Zarek in the reimagined series.

== Early life ==
Hatch was born on May 21, 1945, in Santa Monica, California, to John Raymond Hatch and Elizabeth Hatch (née White). He grew up with four siblings. While in high school, he aspired to become an athlete in pole vaulting, and only had a passing interest in acting, as he considered himself too shy and insecure. The assassination of President Kennedy in 1963, while Hatch had just started college, turned him towards acting; he had been enrolled in a required oral interpretation course at the time, and following the assassination, presented an article written about Kennedy upon which he said: "As I began to read this article, I got so affected by what I was saying that I forgot myself. I was expressing feelings and emotions I tended to keep locked inside of myself."

== Career ==
=== Early work ===
Hatch began his theatrical career with the Los Angeles Repertory Theater, as well as shows in Chicago and Off-Broadway.

=== Television ===
Hatch began working in television in 1970 when he starred as Philip Brent in the daytime soap opera All My Children, a role he played for two years. In the following years, he made guest appearances in prime time series such as Cannon; Nakia; Barnaby Jones; The Rookies, Hawaii Five-O; and The Waltons; as well as appearing in several made-for-TV movies such as F. Scott Fitzgerald and 'The Last of the Belles' (1974) with Susan Sarandon; The Hatfields and the McCoys (1975) with Jack Palance; ‘The Waltons’ (1975); Addie and the King of Hearts (1976) with Jason Robards; and the 1978 television movie Deadman's Curve, in which he portrayed Jan Berry of the musical duo Jan and Dean, alongside Bruce Davison as Dean Torrence.

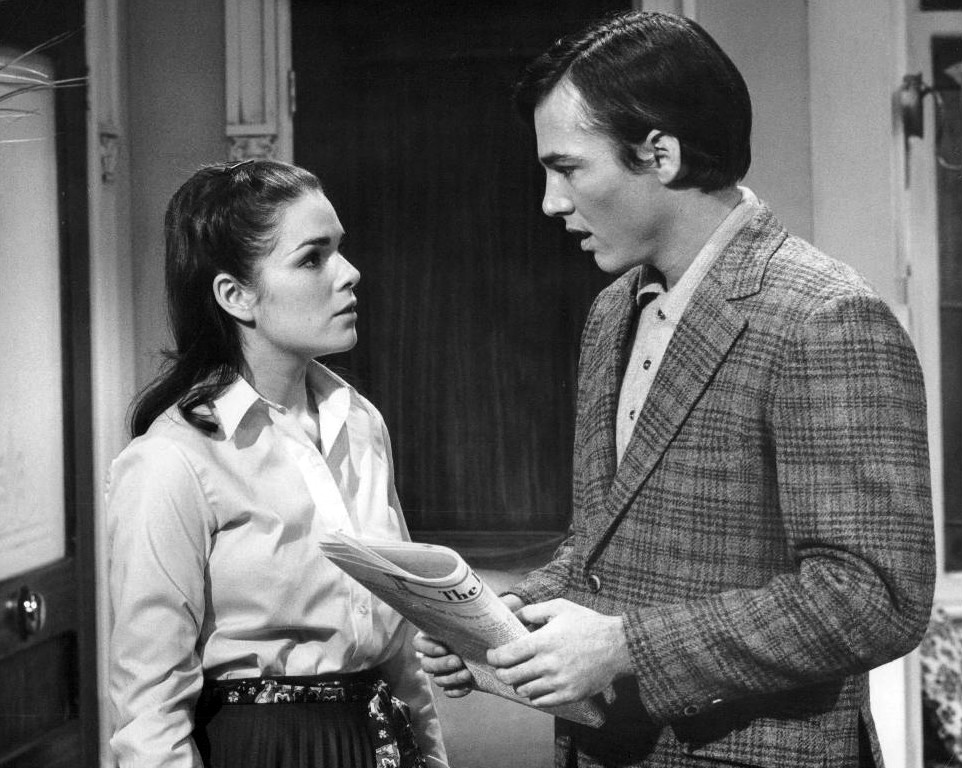
Karen Lynn Gorney and Hatch in All My Children

In 1976, Hatch gained his first major television role as Inspector Dan Robbins on the detective series The Streets of San Francisco, as the replacement for Michael Douglas, who had played Inspector Steve Keller in the series, but had resigned from the cast that year. Though the role was for only one season, Hatch won Germany's Bravo Youth Magazine Award for the role. Following this, he had a recurring role on the series Mary Hartman, Mary Hartman, also for one season in 1977.

In 1978, Hatch gained a starring role in Glen A. Larson's sci-fi series, Battlestar Galactica (1978), which aired for a single season before its high cost motivated its cancellation by ABC-TV. Hatch was nominated for a Golden Globe Award for the role. However, because Hatch held out for more money in the series' toy merchandising with Mattel, his character was conspicuously absent in its action figure line, although Apollo would appear in subsequent revival Battlestar Galactica toylines over the decades.

Throughout the 1970s and 1980s, Hatch made guest appearances on such series as Hotel; Murder, She Wrote; The Love Boat (romantically opposite 20-year-old Teri Hatcher in her first on-screen speaking role); Fantasy Island; Baywatch; Dynasty; and MacGyver. In 1990, Hatch returned to daytime soap operas and appeared on Santa Barbara, originating the character Steven Slade.

In 2013, Hatch made a guest appearance in an adult-oriented episode of The Eric Andre Show on Cartoon Network's Adult Swim.

=== Films ===
Hatch made several low-key theatrical film releases, including Charlie Chan and the Curse of the Dragon Queen (1981) and Prisoners of the Lost Universe (1983). An abridged version of the pilot episode of Battlestar Galactica was released in cinemas, initially overseas and then for a limited run in the U.S., as was a sequel film, Mission Galactica: The Cylon Attack, which was also made from episodes of the series. He starred with Leif Garrett in Party Line (1988) and with Arte Johnson in Second Chance (1996).

=== Battlestar Galactica revival attempt ===
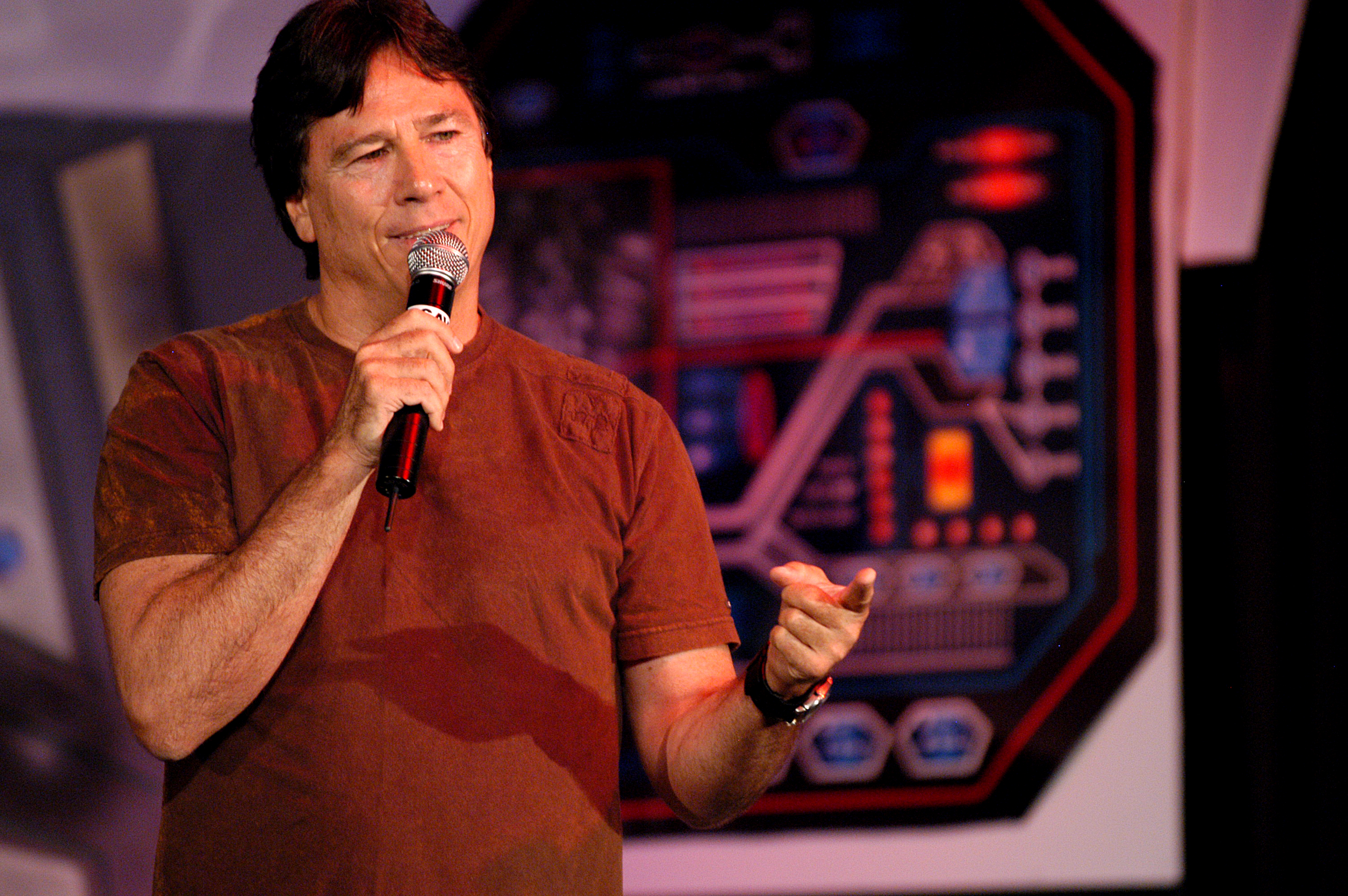
Hatch at Gatecon 2005

In the 1990s, Hatch attempted to revive Battlestar Galactica. He began writing novels based on the series, and also wrote, co-directed and executive-produced a trailer called Battlestar Galactica: The Second Coming in the hopes of enticing Universal Studios – the rights holders for the franchise – into producing a new series. Hatch's series would have been a direct continuation of the original 1978 series, and would have ignored the events of the failed spin-off Galactica 1980, in which Hatch had not appeared. Original actors John Colicos (Baltar), Terry Carter (Colonel Tigh) and Jack Stauffer (Bojay) appeared in the trailer with Hatch. Though the trailer won acclaim at science-fiction conventions, Universal was not interested in Hatch's vision for the revival of Battlestar Galactica, and instead opted for a remake rather than the sequel for which Hatch had campaigned. Hatch, who had reportedly remortgaged his own house to produce the trailer, was bitterly disappointed by this turn of events and was highly critical of the prospective new series.

In 2004, he stated to Sci-Fi Pulse that he had felt resentment over the failure of his planned Galactica continuation and was left "exhausted and sick... I had, over the past several years, bonded deeply with the original characters and story... writing the novels and the comic books and really campaigning to bring back the show."

=== Battlestar Galactica re-imagining ===
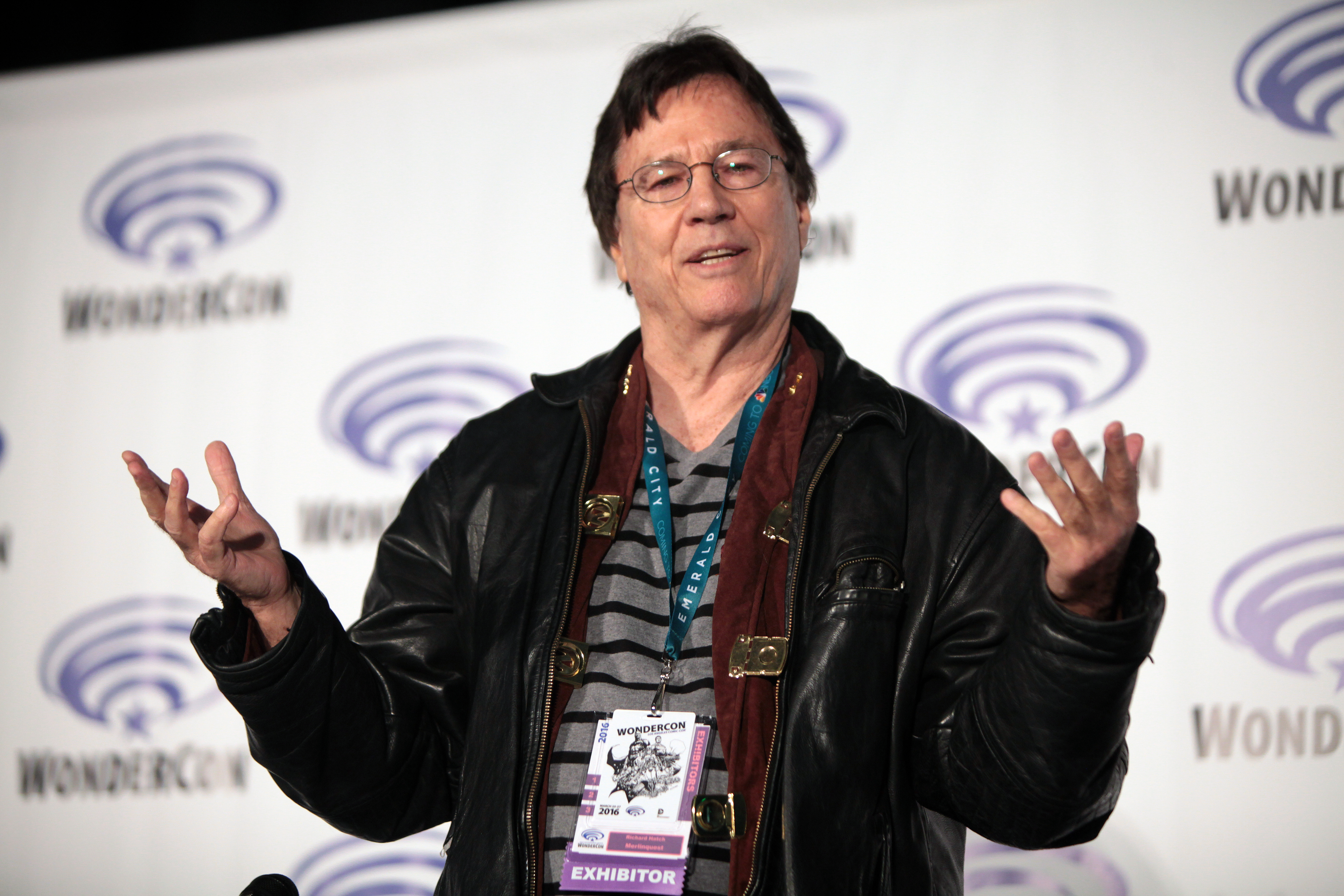
Hatch speaking at the 2016 WonderCon

Despite his resentment, Hatch developed a respect for Ronald D. Moore, the remake show's head writer and producer, when Moore appeared as a featured guest at Galacticon (the Battlestar Galactica 25th anniversary convention, hosted by Hatch) and answered questions posed by a hostile audience. Later, in 2004, Hatch was offered a recurring role in the new Battlestar Galactica series, which he accepted. He portrayed Tom Zarek, a terrorist turned politician who spent twenty years in prison for blowing up a government building. After Zarek's death, Hatch commented that "never did I play this character as a villain nor did I think he was one and I still feel that way," and that he considered the character to be a principled figure who is driven to violence after being "blocked in every way possible" by Roslin and Adama. "Zarek, Adama and Roslin all wanted power for the same reason, to make a positive difference."

== Other work ==
Alongside his attempts to revive the original Battlestar Galactica, Hatch created a trailer for his own space opera titled The Great War of Magellan.

Hatch appeared in InAlienable, a 2008 science-fiction film written and produced by Walter Koenig. In 2011, Hatch worked on a new reality TV series called Who the Frak?, which he created and appeared in as himself. The series was touted as "the world's first social network reality drama." In 2012–13, Hatch appeared in the web series The Silicon Assassin Project. In 2013, he ventured into the Steampunk genre, starring in the short film Cowboys & Engines alongside Malcolm McDowell and Walter Koenig. In 2014, he played the Klingon Commander Kharn in the Star Trek fan film Prelude To Axanar and was to appear in the subsequent fan production Star Trek: Axanar in 2015, though legal issues with Paramount Pictures prevented the project from being completed.

=== Writing ===
With various co-authors, Hatch wrote a series of seven tie-in novels set in the original Battlestar Galactica universe. The series included:

- Armageddon, published August 1, 1997,
- Warhawk, published September 1, 1998
- Resurrection, published July 1, 2001
- Rebellion, published July 1, 2002,
- Paradis, published July 1, 2003,
- Destiny, published June 29, 2004,
- Redemption, published November 25, 2005.

Armageddon and Warhawk were both written with Christopher Golden. Resurrection was written with Stan Timmons. Rebellion was written with Alan Rodgers. Paradis, Destiny, and Redemption were all written with Brad Linaweaver.

== Death ==
Hatch died on February 7, 2017, of pancreatic cancer while he was under hospice care in Los Angeles, at age 71.

== Final film ==
In his final film performance, Hatch played director Haskell Edwards in the film Diminuendo which wrapped a few months before he learned of his pancreatic cancer. Hatch was able to see a rough cut of the film before he died, and a work-in-progress screening was held as a memorial shortly after his death. Diminuendo had its world premiere at the 20th Annual Sarasota Film Festival on April 20, 2018.

== Filmography ==
=== Film ===
- Best Friends (1975) – Jesse
- Deadman's Curve (1978, TV Biography) – Jan Berry of Jan and Dean
- Battlestar Galactica (1978) – Captain Apollo
- The Hustler of Muscle Beach (1980, TV Movie (ABC)) – Nick Demec
- Living Legend: The King of Rock and Roll (1980)
- Charlie Chan and the Curse of the Dragon Queen (1981) – Lee Chan, Jr.
- Prisoners of the Lost Universe (1983) – Dan
- Terror on London Bridge (1985) – Hoffman
- Last Platoon (1988) – Sgt. Chet Costa
- Party Line (1988) – Dan
- Ghetto Blaster (1989) – Travis
- Leathernecks (1989) – Lieutenant Caldwell
- Dark Bar (1989) – Marco
- Mal d'Africa (1990) – Tony La Palma
- Delta Force Commando II: Priority Red One (1990) – Delta Force Leader Brett Haskell
- Renaissance (1994) – Tristan Anderson
- Second Chance (1996) – Mitch
- Iron Thunder (1998) – Nelson
- Battlestar Galactica: The Second Coming (1999, Short) – Commander Apollo
- The Ghost (2001) – Edward
- Unseen Evil (2001) – Dr. Peter Jensen
- Big Shots (2001) – Casting Director
- The Rain Makers (2005) – Wyatt
- InAlienable (2008) – Dr. Eric Norris
- The Little Match Makers (2011) – Officer Candy
- Season of Darkness (2012) – Dr. Shaker
- Dead by Friday (2012) – Father Anthony
- Prelude to Axanar (2014, Short) – Commander Kharn
- Alongside Night (2014) – The Silicon Assassin
- Chatter (2015) – Nate Terry
- The Enchanted Cottage (2016) – Mr. Bradshaw
- Surge of Power: Revenge of the Sequel (2016) – Himself
- Asylum of Darkness (2017) – Dr. Shaker
- The Pod (2017) – Mike Gibson
- Diminuendo (2018) – Haskell Edwards

=== Television ===
- All My Children (1970–1972) as Phil Brent (Erica Kane's second husband)
- The Sixth Sense – Gallows in the Wind (1972) as Owen Preston
- Room 222 (1972) Season 3 Episode 22 "The Quitter" as Donnie LeRoi
- Barnaby Jones (1973) Season 1 Episode 5 "Perchance to Kill" as Eric Garvin
- Kung Fu (1973) "Sun and Cloud Shadow" as David
- Hawaii Five-O (1973 episode "The Child Stealers", and twice in 1975, episodes "Study in Rage" & "The Waterfront Steal")
- The Rookies (1973) Season 2, Episode 12 "Lots of Trees and a Running Stream" as Cleve Andrews
- The Waltons (1974 and 1975) as Wade Walton
- Cannon (1975) 5x05 "The Victim as Allen Farrell", 5x13 "The Star 1" and "The Star 2" as Terry Kane
- The Rookies (1975) Season 3 Episode 22 "A Deadly Image" as Vic Dorsey
- Addie and the King of Hearts (1976) as Mr. Davenport
- The Streets of San Francisco (1976–1977) Season 5, all 24 episodes, as Inspector Dan Robbins
- Jan and Dean (1978) as Jan Berry
- Battlestar Galactica (1978–79 TV series), all 21 episodes, as Captain Apollo
- The Love Boat, S6 E7 as Roger Lewis in "Too Many Dads" (1982); S8 E23, "Vicki's Gentleman Caller", "Partners to the End, "The Perfect Arrangement" (1985) as Tom Whitlaw; and Season 9 Episode 8.
- Murder, She Wrote (1984) Season 1 Episode 2 "Deadly Lady" as Terry Jones
- T. J. Hooker (1985) as Robert Marshall
- Riptide (1985) episode Whip Out as Billy Hagan (and the Harbor Masters)
- MacGyver (1986) Season 2 Episode 10 "Three for the Road" as Michael Talbot
- Santa Barbara (1990) as Stephen Slade
- Battlestar Galactica (2004–2009) Season 1–4, 22 episodes, as Tom Zarek
- The Eric Andre Show (2013) as himself
- Blade of Honor (2017), five episodes as Admiral DiCarrek
