= 2005 NBA playoffs =

Postseason tournament

Tournament details
- Dates: April 23–June 23, 2005
- Season: 2004–05
- Teams: 16

Final positions
- Champions: San Antonio Spurs (3rd title)
- Runners-up: Detroit Pistons
- Semifinalists: Miami Heat; Phoenix Suns

Tournament statistics
- Scoring leader(s): Tim Duncan (Spurs) (23.6 PPG)

Awards
- MVP: Tim Duncan (Spurs)

The 2005 NBA playoffs was the postseason tournament of the National Basketball Association's 2004–05 season. The tournament concluded with the Western Conference champion San Antonio Spurs defeating the Eastern Conference champion and defending champion Detroit Pistons 4 games to 3 in the NBA Finals. Tim Duncan was named Finals MVP.

== Overview ==
The Chicago Bulls and Washington Wizards ended long playoff droughts in 2005, meeting each other in the first round. For the Washington Wizards, it was their first playoff appearance since 1997 — even more ironic their opponents for that postseason appearance were the Bulls who swept them on their way to their fifth NBA title. For the Chicago Bulls, it was their first post-Michael Jordan playoff appearance, as their last playoff game was Game 6 of the 1998 NBA Finals. They consistently placed at or near the bottom of the Central Division in between, and their 47–35 season in 2005 was a 24–game improvement from 2004.

The Phoenix Suns returned to the NBA playoffs after a one season absence. The Houston Rockets and the Memphis Grizzlies entered their second consecutive postseason.

For the Los Angeles Lakers, it marked the first time in 11 seasons (dating back to 1994) and the fifth time in NBA history that they missed the playoffs. This was thus the last time until 2018 that the playoffs would be played entirely outside of Los Angeles. The Minnesota Timberwolves missed the playoffs for the first time since 1996.

This was the last time that the Seattle SuperSonics would be in the playoffs before they relocated to Oklahoma to become the Oklahoma City Thunder.

For the third straight year (fifth overall) the Pacers met the Celtics in the first round. Boston won in 2003 4–2, while Indiana swept Boston in 2004. This time, Indiana won 4–3. It would be Boston's last playoff appearance until 2008.

With their first round series win over the Chicago Bulls, the Washington Wizards won their first playoff series since 1982, and first playoff game since 1988. They also won a best of seven series for the first time since 1979. With their first round sweep of the Memphis Grizzlies, the Phoenix Suns won their first playoff series since 2000.

With their conference semifinals sweep of the Washington Wizards, the Miami Heat became the first team to go 8–0 through the first two rounds after the first round was made into a best-of-7 in the 2003 playoffs. The 2009 Cavaliers, 2010 Magic, 2012 Spurs, 2016 Cavaliers, 2017 Cavaliers and the 2017 Warriors followed suit. No team (until 2016) has made the finals after going 8–0 in the first two rounds, let alone win 12 straight games going to the NBA Finals (until the 2017 Warriors), though the Spurs came close in 2012 when they won their first 10 playoff games, then lost their next four to the Oklahoma City Thunder. In 2016, the Cleveland Cavaliers became the first team to go 8–0 through the first two rounds and make the NBA Finals.

With their conference semifinals victory over the Dallas Mavericks, the Phoenix Suns advanced to the Western Conference Finals for the first time since 1993, where they lost to the San Antonio Spurs in five games.

Game 6 of the Spurs–SuperSonics series was the last NBA Playoff game ever played at Key Arena.

With their Game 7 win over the Miami Heat, the Detroit Pistons advanced to their second consecutive NBA Finals.

The NBA Finals marked the first time since 1987 that the two previous champions met in the Finals (the Spurs won in 2003, the Pistons in 2004).

The NBA Finals went to a Game 7 for the first time since 1994.

With their Game 7 win over the Detroit Pistons, the San Antonio Spurs won the NBA Championship. For the Spurs, it was their third title (they also won in the lockout–shortened season of 1998–99).

== Format ==
Beginning with the 2004–05 season, with the addition of the 30th NBA franchise, the Charlotte Bobcats, the NBA realigned its divisions. Each conference now has three divisions of five teams each, and at this point in time, the winner of each division was guaranteed a top three playoff seed, regardless of whether the team had one of the top eight records in its conference. However, the division champion was not guaranteed home court advantage; a division-leading team with a poor record could be ranked number three but face a sixth seed with a better record, which would then have home court advantage. This has since been rectified by the NBA.

== Playoff qualifying ==
=== Eastern Conference ===
==== Best record in conference ====
The Miami Heat clinched the best record in the Eastern Conference, and had home court advantage throughout the Eastern Conference playoffs.

==== Clinched a playoff berth ====
The following teams clinched a playoff berth in the East:

1. Miami Heat (59–23) (clinched Southeast division)
2. Detroit Pistons (54–28) (clinched Central division)
3. Boston Celtics (45–37) (clinched Atlantic division)
4. Chicago Bulls (47–35)
5. Washington Wizards (45–37)
6. Indiana Pacers (44–38)
7. Philadelphia 76ers (43–39)
8. New Jersey Nets (42–40)

=== Western Conference ===
==== Best record in NBA ====
The Phoenix Suns clinched the best record in the NBA, and earned home court advantage throughout the entire playoffs. However, when Phoenix lost to the San Antonio Spurs in the Western Conference Finals, the Spurs gained home court advantage for the NBA Finals.

==== Clinched a playoff berth ====
The following teams clinched a playoff berth in the West:

1. Phoenix Suns (62–20) (clinched Pacific division)
2. San Antonio Spurs (59–23) (clinched Southwest division)
3. Seattle SuperSonics (52–30) (clinched Northwest division)
4. Dallas Mavericks (58–24)
5. Houston Rockets (51–31)
6. Sacramento Kings (50–32)
7. Denver Nuggets (49–33)
8. Memphis Grizzlies (45–37)

== Bracket ==
First Round	Conference Semifinals
E1	Miami*	4
E8	New Jersey	0
E1	Miami*	4
E5	Washington	0
E4	Chicago	2
E5	Washington	4
Eastern Conference
E3	Boston*	3
E6	Indiana	4
E6	Indiana	2
E2	Detroit*	4
E2	Detroit*	4
E7	Philadelphia	1
W1	Phoenix*	4
W8	Memphis	0
W1	Phoenix*	4
W4	Dallas	2
W4	Dallas	4
W5	Houston	3
Western Conference
W3	Seattle*	4
W6	Sacramento	1
W3	Seattle*	2
W2	San Antonio*	4
W2	San Antonio*	4
W7	Denver	1

Conference Finals
E1	Miami*	3
E2	Detroit*	4
W1	Phoenix*	1
W2	San Antonio*	4

NBA Finals
E2	Detroit*	3
W2	San Antonio*	4

- * Division winner
- Bold Series winner
- Italic Team with home-court advantage

== First round ==
All times are in Eastern Daylight Time (UTC−4)

=== Eastern Conference first round ===
==== (1) Miami Heat vs. (8) New Jersey Nets ====
ABC

April 24
3:30 pm

Recap

New Jersey Nets 98, Miami Heat 116
Scoring by quarter: 19–22, 23–32, 31–33, 25–29
Pts: Vince Carter 27; Rebs: Vince Carter 10; Asts: Vince Carter 8	Pts: Dwyane Wade 32; Rebs: Haslem, O'Neal 11 each Asts: Dwyane Wade 8
Miami leads series, 1–0

American Airlines Arena, Miami
Attendance: 20,212
Referees: Jess Kersey, Steve Javie, Tom Washington

TNT

April 26
8:00 pm

Recap

New Jersey Nets 87, Miami Heat 104
Scoring by quarter: 16–26, 23–22, 20–28, 28–28
Pts: Nenad Krstić 27; Rebs: Collins, Krstić 8 each Asts: Best, Kidd 5 each	Pts: Alonzo Mourning 21; Rebs: Shaquille O'Neal 10; Asts: Dwyane Wade 10
Miami leads series, 2–0

American Airlines Arena, Miami
Attendance: 20,276
Referees: Bill Kennedy, Bill Spooner, Joe Crawford

TNT

April 28
7:00 pm

Recap

Miami Heat 108, New Jersey Nets 105 (2OT)
Scoring by quarter: 17–24, 32–21, 25–24, 16–21, Overtime: 9–9, 9–6
Pts: Shaquille O'Neal 25; Rebs: Udonis Haslem 19; Asts: Dwyane Wade 8	Pts: Vince Carter 36; Rebs: Jason Kidd 16; Asts: Jason Kidd 13
Miami leads series, 3–0

Continental Airlines Arena, East Rutherford, New Jersey
Attendance: 20,174
Referees: Dick Bavetta, James Capers, Mike Callahan

ABC

May 1
3:30 pm

Recap

Miami Heat 110, New Jersey Nets 97
Scoring by quarter: 27–15, 21–30, 27–18, 35–34
Pts: Dwyane Wade 34; Rebs: Udonis Haslem 11; Asts: Dwyane Wade 9	Pts: Jason Kidd 25; Rebs: Vince Carter 10; Asts: Jason Kidd 7
Miami wins series, 4–0

Continental Airlines Arena, East Rutherford, New Jersey
Attendance: 20,174
Referees: Eddie F. Rush, Monty Mccutchen, Sean Corbin

Regular-season series
Miami won 3–0 in the regular-season series

November 3, 2004

Recap

Miami Heat 100, New Jersey Nets 77

Continental Airlines Arena, East Rutherford, New Jersey

March 3, 2005

Recap

Miami Heat 106, New Jersey Nets 90

Continental Airlines Arena, East Rutherford, New Jersey

March 12, 2005

Recap

New Jersey Nets 65, Miami Heat 90

American Airlines Arena, Miami

This was the first playoff meeting between the Heat and the Nets.

==== (2) Detroit Pistons vs. (7) Philadelphia 76ers ====
ABC

April 23
3:00 pm

Recap

Philadelphia 76ers 85, Detroit Pistons 106
Scoring by quarter: 28–16, 18–32, 24–32, 15–26
Pts: Allen Iverson 30; Rebs: Samuel Dalembert 18; Asts: Allen Iverson 10	Pts: Rasheed Wallace 29; Rebs: B. Wallace, R. Wallace 10 each Asts: Richard Hamilton 5
Detroit leads series, 1–0

The Palace of Auburn Hills, Auburn Hills, Michigan
Attendance: 22,076
Referees: Bernie Fryer, Greg Willard, Jack Nies

NBA TV

April 26
7:30 pm

Recap

Philadelphia 76ers 84, Detroit Pistons 99
Scoring by quarter: 23–20, 13–22, 21–27, 27–30
Pts: Allen Iverson 19; Rebs: Samuel Dalembert 11; Asts: Allen Iverson 10	Pts: Richard Hamilton 23; Rebs: Ben Wallace 10; Asts: Chauncey Billups 8
Detroit leads series, 2–0

The Palace of Auburn Hills, Auburn Hills, Michigan
Attendance: 22,076
Referees: Dick Bavetta, Mike Callahan, Tony Brothers

ESPN

April 29
8:00 pm

Recap

Detroit Pistons 104, Philadelphia 76ers 115
Scoring by quarter: 32–24, 22–27, 24–29, 26–35
Pts: Ben Wallace 29; Rebs: Ben Wallace 16; Asts: Richard Hamilton 12	Pts: Allen Iverson 37; Rebs: Samuel Dalembert 10; Asts: Allen Iverson 15
Detroit leads series, 2–1

Wachovia Center, Philadelphia
Attendance: 16,907
Referees: Greg Willard, Monty Mccutchen, Ron Garretson

ABC

May 1
1:00 pm

Recap

Detroit Pistons 97, Philadelphia 76ers 92 (OT)
Scoring by quarter: 21–24, 20–14, 19–23, 23–22, Overtime: 14–9
Pts: Chauncey Billups 25; Rebs: Ben Wallace 12; Asts: Chauncey Billups 7	Pts: Allen Iverson 36; Rebs: Samuel Dalembert 15; Asts: Allen Iverson 8
Detroit leads series, 3–1

Wachovia Center, Philadelphia
Attendance: 15,894
Referees: Bob Delaney, David Jones, Steve Javie

NBA TV

May 3
8:00 pm

Recap

Philadelphia 76ers 78, Detroit Pistons 88
Scoring by quarter: 24–21, 20–22, 17–17, 17–28
Pts: Allen Iverson 34; Rebs: Samuel Dalembert 10; Asts: Allen Iverson 7	Pts: Billups, Hamilton 23 each Rebs: Ben Wallace 13; Asts: Chauncey Billups 7
Detroit wins series, 4–1

The Palace of Auburn Hills, Auburn Hills, Michigan
Attendance: 22,076
Referees: Eddie F. Rush, Scott Foster, Sean Corbin

Regular-season series
Detroit won 3–1 in the regular-season series

November 6, 2004

Recap

Philadelphia 76ers 91, Detroit Pistons 99

The Palace of Auburn Hills, Auburn Hills, Michigan

January 15, 2005

Recap

Philadelphia 76ers 95, Detroit Pistons 99

The Palace of Auburn Hills, Auburn Hills, Michigan

February 16, 2005

Recap

Detroit Pistons 93, Philadelphia 76ers 75

Wachovia Center, Philadelphia

March 23, 2005

Recap

Detroit Pistons 84, Philadelphia 76ers 107

Wachovia Center, Philadelphia

This was the third playoff meeting between these two teams, with each team winning one series apiece. The first meeting took place while the Nationals/76ers franchise were in Syracuse and the Pistons franchise were in Fort Wayne.

Previous playoff series
Tied 1–1 in all-time playoff series

1955

Fort Wayne Pistons 3, Syracuse Nationals 4

1955 NBA Finals

2003

Detroit Pistons 4, Philadelphia 76ers 2

2003 Eastern Conference Semifinals

==== (3) Boston Celtics vs. (6) Indiana Pacers ====
ESPN

April 23
8:00 pm

Recap

Indiana Pacers 82, Boston Celtics 102
Scoring by quarter: 20–18, 11–39, 25–29, 26–16
Pts: Stephen Jackson 25; Rebs: Dale Davis 10; Asts: Anthony Johnson 5	Pts: Raef LaFrentz 21; Rebs: Paul Pierce 9 Asts: Gary Payton 7
Boston leads series, 1–0

FleetCenter, Boston
Attendance: 18,624
Referees: Dan Crawford, Joe DeRosa, Tim Donaghy

TNT

April 25
7:00 pm

Recap

Indiana Pacers 82, Boston Celtics 79
Scoring by quarter: 30–22, 17–20, 17–27, 18–10
Pts: Reggie Miller 28; Rebs: Anthony Johnson 7 Asts: Anthony Johnson 7	Pts: Paul Pierce 32; Rebs: Pierce, Walker 7 each Asts: Paul Pierce 5
Series tied, 1–1

FleetCenter, Boston
Attendance: 18,624
Referees: Jack Nies, Joe Forte, Scott Wall

NBA TV

April 28
7:30 pm

Recap

Boston Celtics 76, Indiana Pacers 99
Scoring by quarter: 19–24, 19–31, 21–16, 17–28
Pts: Paul Pierce 19; Rebs: Antoine Walker 9 Asts: Gary Payton 6	Pts: Reggie Miller 33; Rebs: Jermaine O'Neal 11; Asts: Anthony Johnson 8
Indiana leads series, 2–1

Conseco Fieldhouse, Indianapolis
Attendance: 18,345
Referees: Bennett Salvatore, Bill Kennedy, Tom Washington

ESPN

April 30
7:00 pm

Recap

Boston Celtics 110, Indiana Pacers 79
Scoring by quarter: 31–20, 25–27, 22–16, 32–16
Pts: Paul Pierce 30; Rebs: Jefferson, Pierce 7 Asts: Paul Pierce 8	Pts: Stephen Jackson 24; Rebs: James Jones 9 Asts: Anthony Johnson 7
Series tied, 2–2

Conseco Fieldhouse, Indianapolis
Attendance: 18,345
Referees: Derrick Stafford, Michael Smith, Mike Callahan

TNT

May 3
7:30 pm

Recap

Indiana Pacers 90, Boston Celtics 85
Scoring by quarter: 23–21, 27–21, 20–23, 20–20
Pts: Jermaine O'Neal 19; Rebs: Jermaine O'Neal 10; Asts: Jamaal Tinsley 7	Pts: Paul Pierce 27; Rebs: three players 7 each Asts: four players 3 each
Indiana leads series, 3–2

FleetCenter, Boston
Attendance: 18,624
Referees: Ken Mauer, Monty Mccutchen, Ron Garretson

TNT

May 5
7:00 pm

Recap

Boston Celtics 92, Indiana Pacers 89 (OT)
Scoring by quarter: 20–27, 29–16, 21–19, 14–22, Overtime: 8–5
Pts: Antoine Walker 24; Rebs: Al Jefferson 14; Asts: Paul Pierce 6	Pts: Jermaine O'Neal 26; Rebs: Dale Davis 14; Asts: Anthony Johnson 4
Series tied, 3–3

Conseco Fieldhouse, Indianapolis
Attendance: 18,345
Referees: Bill Spooner, Scott Foster, Steve Javie

TNT

May 7
7:00 pm

Recap

Indiana Pacers 97, Boston Celtics 70
Scoring by quarter: 22–20, 13–12, 29–18, 33–20
Pts: Stephen Jackson 24; Rebs: Jeff Foster 12; Asts: Jermaine O'Neal 6	Pts: Antoine Walker 20; Rebs: three players 7 each Asts: Gary Payton 7
Indiana wins series, 4–3

FleetCenter, Boston
Attendance: 18,624
Referees: Bob Delaney, Dan Crawford, Greg Willard

- This would be the Celtics last loss in the First Round until 2013.
- As of 2026, this remains the Pacers last playoff series win against the Celtics.

Regular-season series
Indiana won 2–1 in the regular-season series

November 5, 2004

Recap

Indiana Pacers 100, Boston Celtics 94

FleetCenter, Boston

November 23, 2004

Recap

Boston Celtics 96, Indiana Pacers 106

Conseco Fieldhouse, Indianapolis

January 26, 2005

Recap

Indiana Pacers 86, Boston Celtics 100

FleetCenter, Boston

This was the fifth playoff meeting between these two teams, with the Celtics winning three of the first four meetings.

Previous playoff series
Boston leads 3–1 in all-time playoff series

1991

Boston Celtics 3, Indiana Pacers 2

1991 Eastern Conference First Round

1992

Boston Celtics 3, Indiana Pacers 0

1992 Eastern Conference First Round

2003

Boston Celtics 4, Indiana Pacers 2

2003 Eastern Conference First Round

2004

Boston Celtics 0, Indiana Pacers 4

2004 Eastern Conference First Round

==== (4) Chicago Bulls vs. (5) Washington Wizards ====
TNT

April 24
4:30 pm

Recap

Washington Wizards 94, Chicago Bulls 103
Scoring by quarter: 26–24, 26–29, 30–24, 12–26
Pts: Larry Hughes 31; Rebs: Kwame Brown 9 Asts: Gilbert Arenas 8	Pts: Ben Gordon 30; Rebs: Andrés Nocioni 18; Asts: Kirk Hinrich 7
Chicago leads series, 1–0

United Center, Chicago
Attendance: 22,655
Referees: Dick Bavetta, Michael Smith, Mike Callahan

NBA TV

April 27
7:30 pm

Recap

Washington Wizards 103, Chicago Bulls 113
Scoring by quarter: 29–19, 21–38, 20–24, 33–32
Pts: Gilbert Arenas 39; Rebs: Larry Hughes 10; Asts: Larry Hughes 5	Pts: Kirk Hinrich 34; Rebs: Chris Duhon 8 Asts: Chris Duhon 7
Chicago leads series, 2–0

United Center, Chicago
Attendance: 22,605
Referees: David Jones, Monty Mccutchen, Ron Garretson

TNT

April 30
3:00 pm

Recap

Chicago Bulls 99, Washington Wizards 117
Scoring by quarter: 23–31, 32–26, 22–33, 22–27
Pts: Tyson Chandler 15; Rebs: Antonio Davis 11; Asts: three players 4 each	Pts: Gilbert Arenas 32; Rebs: Haywood, Thomas 9 each Asts: Gilbert Arenas 7
Chicago leads series, 2–1

MCI Center, Washington, D.C.
Attendance: 20,173
Referees: Bennett Salvatore, Tom Washington, Tony Brothers

TNT

May 2
7:00 pm

Recap

Chicago Bulls 99, Washington Wizards 106
Scoring by quarter: 15–29, 22–32, 23–19, 39–26
Pts: Hinrich, Pargo 18 each Rebs: Tyson Chandler 13; Asts: Gordon, Hinrich 5 each	Pts: Juan Dixon 35; Rebs: Etan Thomas 9 Asts: Gilbert Arenas 5
Series tied, 2–2

MCI Center, Washington, D.C.
Attendance: 20,173
Referees: Dan Crawford, James Capers, Joe Forte

TNT

May 4
6:00 pm

Recap

Washington Wizards 112, Chicago Bulls 110
Scoring by quarter: 34–28, 29–21, 23–24, 26–37
Pts: Larry Hughes 33; Rebs: Antawn Jamison 10; Asts: Gilbert Arenas 8	Pts: Ben Gordon 27; Rebs: Tyson Chandler 10; Asts: Kirk Hinrich 7
Washington leads series, 3–2

United Center, Chicago
Attendance: 22,250
Referees: Bob Delaney, Derrick Stafford, Greg Willard

ESPN

May 6
8:00 pm

Recap

Chicago Bulls 91, Washington Wizards 94
Scoring by quarter: 26–23, 28–29, 20–16, 17–26
Pts: Hinrich, Nocioni 22 each Rebs: Tyson Chandler 11; Asts: Kirk Hinrich 9	Pts: Larry Hughes 21; Rebs: Ruffin, Haywood 8 each Asts: Gilbert Arenas 7
Washington wins series, 4–2

MCI Center, Washington, D.C.
Attendance: 20,173
Referees: Bernie Fryer, Jack Nies, Jim Clark

- Gilbert Arenas hits the game-winning buzzer beater in Game 5.

Regular-season series
Washington won 2–1 in the regular-season series

December 4, 2004

Recap

Chicago Bulls 88, Washington Wizards 95

MCI Center, Washington, D.C.

February 25, 2005

Recap

Washington Wizards 90, Chicago Bulls 97

United Center, Chicago, Illinois

April 13, 2005

Recap

Chicago Bulls 82, Washington Wizards 93

MCI Center, Washington, D.C.

This was the second playoff meeting between these two teams, with the Bulls winning the first meeting.

Previous playoff series
Chicago leads 1–0 in all-time playoff series

1997

Chicago Bulls 3, Washington Bullets 0

1997 Eastern Conference First Round

=== Western Conference first round ===
==== (1) Phoenix Suns vs. (8) Memphis Grizzlies ====
TNT

April 24
9:30 pm

Recap

Memphis Grizzlies 103, Phoenix Suns 114
Scoring by quarter: 28–39, 22–20, 28–28, 25–27
Pts: Mike Miller 19; Rebs: Shane Battier 9 Asts: Jason Williams 5	Pts: Shawn Marion 26; Rebs: Shawn Marion 13; Asts: Steve Nash 13
Phoenix leads series, 1–0

America West Arena, Phoenix, Arizona
Attendance: 18,422
Referees: Bennett Salvatore, Bob Delaney, Sean Corbin

TNT

April 27
7:30 pm

Recap

Memphis Grizzlies 103, Phoenix Suns 108
Scoring by quarter: 31–29, 23–31, 23–22, 26–26
Pts: Pau Gasol 28; Rebs: Pau Gasol 16; Asts: Pau Gasol 5	Pts: Amar'e Stoudemire 34; Rebs: Shawn Marion 13; Asts: Steve Nash 15
Phoenix leads series, 2–0

America West Arena, Phoenix, Arizona
Attendance: 18,422
Referees: Blane Reichelt, Eddie F. Rush, Joe DeRosa

ESPN2

April 29
8:00 pm

Recap

Phoenix Suns 110, Memphis Grizzlies 90
Scoring by quarter: 31–30, 26–17, 26–20, 27–23
Pts: Amar'e Stoudemire 30; Rebs: Shawn Marion 13; Asts: Steve Nash 8	Pts: Lorenzen Wright 14; Rebs: three players 8 each Asts: Jason Williams 6
Phoenix leads series, 3–0

FedExForum, Memphis, Tennessee
Attendance: 18,119
Referees: Joe Forte, Steve Javie, Tim Donaghy

TNT

May 1
7:00 pm

Recap

Phoenix Suns 123, Memphis Grizzlies 115
Scoring by quarter: 39–20, 24–36, 28–26, 32–33
Pts: Joe Johnson 25; Rebs: Shawn Marion 11; Asts: Steve Nash 9	Pts: Pau Gasol 28; Rebs: Dahntay Jones 5 Asts: Jason Williams 8
Phoenix wins series, 4–0

FedExForum, Memphis, Tennessee
Attendance: 17,243
Referees: Ken Mauer, Mark Wunderlich, Ron Garretson

Regular-season series
Tied 2–2 in the regular-season series

December 23, 2004

Recap

Memphis Grizzlies 102, Phoenix Suns 109

America West Arena, Phoenix, Arizona

January 19, 2005

Recap

Memphis Grizzlies 88, Phoenix Suns 79

America West Arena, Phoenix, Arizona

February 1, 2005

Recap

Phoenix Suns 97, Memphis Grizzlies 108

FedExForum, Memphis, Tennessee

March 20, 2005

Recap

Phoenix Suns 97, Memphis Grizzlies 91

FedExForum, Memphis, Tennessee

This was the first playoff meeting between the Suns and the Grizzlies.

==== (2) San Antonio Spurs vs. (7) Denver Nuggets ====
TNT

April 24
7:00 pm

Recap

Denver Nuggets 93, San Antonio Spurs 87
Scoring by quarter: 23–27, 29–25, 21–23, 20–12
Pts: Andre Miller 31; Rebs: Marcus Camby 12; Asts: Andre Miller 5	Pts: Manu Ginóbili 23; Rebs: Nazr Mohammed 15; Asts: Tony Parker 6
Denver leads series, 1–0

SBC Center, San Antonio
Attendance: 18,797
Referees: Bill Spooner, David Jones, Eddie F. Rush

TNT

April 27
7:00 pm

Recap

Denver Nuggets 76, San Antonio Spurs 104
Scoring by quarter: 18–29, 14–34, 30–23, 14–18
Pts: DeMarr Johnson 12; Rebs: Marcus Camby 12; Asts: Andre Miller 7	Pts: Tim Duncan 24; Rebs: Duncan, Horry 9 each Asts: Tony Parker 6
Series tied, 1–1

SBC Center, San Antonio
Attendance: 18,797
Referees: Greg Willard, Mark Wunderlich, Steve Javie

ESPN

April 30
8:30 pm

Recap

San Antonio Spurs 86, Denver Nuggets 78
Scoring by quarter: 24–20, 26–21, 11–17, 25–20
Pts: Manu Ginóbili 32; Rebs: Tim Duncan 11; Asts: Brent Barry 4	Pts: Carmelo Anthony 19; Rebs: Marcus Camby 14; Asts: Andre Miller 7
San Antonio leads series, 2–1

Pepsi Center, Denver, Colorado
Attendance: 19,913
Referees: Dan Crawford, Leon Wood, Scott Foster

NBA TV

May 2
8:00 pm

Recap

San Antonio Spurs 126, Denver Nuggets 115 (OT)
Scoring by quarter: 28–27, 29–24, 30–29, 20–27, Overtime: 19–8
Pts: Tim Duncan 39; Rebs: Tim Duncan 8 Asts: Tony Parker 7	Pts: Earl Boykins 32; Rebs: Marcus Camby 14; Asts: Anthony, Boykins 5 each
San Antonio leads series, 3–1

Pepsi Center, Denver, Colorado
Attendance: 19,776
Referees: Bennie Adams, Derrick Stafford, Dick Bavetta

TNT

May 4
8:30 pm

Recap

Denver Nuggets 89, San Antonio Spurs 99
Scoring by quarter: 21–25, 22–20, 24–26, 22–28
Pts: Carmelo Anthony 25; Rebs: Marcus Camby 10; Asts: Andre Miller 6	Pts: Tony Parker 21; Rebs: Nazr Mohammed 13; Asts: Tony Parker 7
San Antonio wins series, 4–1

SBC Center, San Antonio
Attendance: 18,797
Referees: Jim Clark, Luis Grillo, Mike Callahan

Regular-season series
Tied 2–2 in the regular-season series

November 26, 2004

Recap

San Antonio Spurs 89, Denver Nuggets 75

Pepsi Center, Denver, Colorado

January 8, 2005

Recap

Denver Nuggets 90, San Antonio Spurs 99

SBC Center, San Antonio, Texas

March 12, 2005

Recap

Denver Nuggets 90, San Antonio Spurs 87

SBC Center, San Antonio, Texas

April 1, 2005

Recap

San Antonio Spurs 84, Denver Nuggets 102

Pepsi Center, Denver, Colorado

This was the fifth playoff meeting between these two teams, with the Spurs winning three of the first four meetings.

Previous playoff series
San Antonio leads 3–1 in all-time playoff series

1983

Denver Nuggets 1, San Antonio Spurs 4

1983 Western Conference Semifinals

1985

Denver Nuggets 3, San Antonio Spurs 2

1985 Western Conference First Round

1990

Denver Nuggets 0, San Antonio Spurs 3

1990 Western Conference First Round

1995

Denver Nuggets 0, San Antonio Spurs 3

1995 Western Conference First Round

==== (3) Seattle SuperSonics vs. (6) Sacramento Kings ====
ESPN

April 23
5:30 pm

Recap

Sacramento Kings 82, Seattle SuperSonics 87
Scoring by quarter: 22–30, 18–25, 24–15, 18–17
Pts: Peja Stojaković 24; Rebs: Kenny Thomas 8 Asts: Mike Bibby 4	Pts: Ray Allen 28; Rebs: Evans, James 15 each Asts: Daniels, Ridnour 4 each
Seattle leads series, 1–0

KeyArena, Seattle
Attendance: 17,072
Referees: Bennie Adams, Jim Clark, Ron Garretson

TNT

April 26
7:30 pm

Recap

Sacramento Kings 93, Seattle SuperSonics 105
Scoring by quarter: 22–26, 22–29, 18–33, 31–17
Pts: Bobby Jackson 17; Rebs: Peja Stojaković 10; Asts: Mike Bibby 8	Pts: Ray Allen 26; Rebs: Jerome James 9 Asts: Allen, Ridnour 6 each
Seattle leads series, 2–0

KeyArena, Seattle
Attendance: 17,072
Referees: Bennett Salvatore, Bob Delaney, Sean Corbin

ESPN

April 29
7:30 pm

Recap

Seattle SuperSonics 104, Sacramento Kings 116
Scoring by quarter: 19–31, 26–23, 36–38, 23–24
Pts: Ray Allen 33; Rebs: Jerome James 9 Asts: Allen, Ridnour 5 each	Pts: Mike Bibby 31; Rebs: Bibby, Thomas 7 each Asts: Mike Bibby 4
Seattle leads series, 2–1

ARCO Arena, Sacramento, California
Attendance: 17,317
Referees: Blane Reichelt, Eddie F. Rush, Joe DeRosa

TNT

May 1
7:30 pm

Recap

Seattle SuperSonics 115, Sacramento Kings 102
Scoring by quarter: 20–31, 36–37, 24–16, 35–18
Pts: Ray Allen 45; Rebs: James, Lewis 8 each Asts: Allen, Daniels 6 each	Pts: Peja Stojaković 25; Rebs: Kenny Thomas 14; Asts: Mike Bibby 7
Seattle leads series, 3–1

ARCO Arena, Sacramento, California
Attendance: 17,317
Referees: Bernie Fryer, Bill Spooner, Jack Nies

TNT

May 3
10:00 pm

Recap

Sacramento Kings 118, Seattle SuperSonics 122
Scoring by quarter: 24–29, 33–31, 36–30, 25–32
Pts: Peja Stojaković 38; Rebs: Miller, Thomas 6 each Asts: Brad Miller 11	Pts: Ray Allen 30; Rebs: Nick Collison 9 Asts: Antonio Daniels 8
Seattle wins series, 4–1

KeyArena, Seattle
Attendance: 17,072
Referees: Mark Wunderlich, Steve Javie, Tom Washington

- This marked the Sonics last playoffs series win until 2011, when they had already moved to Oklahoma City & was renamed as the Oklahoma City Thunder.

Regular-season series
Seattle won 3–1 in the regular-season series

November 10, 2004

Recap

Sacramento Kings 78, Seattle SuperSonics 108

KeyArena, Seattle

February 1, 2005

Recap

Seattle SuperSonics 106, Sacramento Kings 101

ARCO Arena, Sacramento, California

February 10, 2005

Recap

Sacramento Kings 107, Seattle SuperSonics 115

KeyArena, Seattle

April 5, 2005

Recap

Seattle SuperSonics 101, Sacramento Kings 122

ARCO Arena, Sacramento, California

This was the second playoff meeting between these two teams, with the SuperSonics winning the first meeting.

Previous playoff series
Seattle leads 1–0 in all-time playoff series

1996

Sacramento Kings 1, Seattle SuperSonics 3

1996 Western Conference First Round

==== (4) Dallas Mavericks vs. (5) Houston Rockets ====
ESPN

April 23
12:30 pm

Recap

Houston Rockets 98, Dallas Mavericks 86
Scoring by quarter: 26–16, 26–24, 18–23, 28–23
Pts: Tracy McGrady 34; Rebs: Mutombo, Yao 8 each Asts: Tracy McGrady 6	Pts: Dirk Nowitzki 21; Rebs: Josh Howard 10; Asts: Nowitzki, Terry 3 each
Houston leads series, 1–0

American Airlines Center, Dallas
Attendance: 20,678
Referees: Dan Crawford, James Capers, Ken Mauer

TNT

April 25
9:30 pm

Recap

Houston Rockets 113, Dallas Mavericks 111
Scoring by quarter: 34–30, 26–26, 24–32, 29–23
Pts: Yao Ming 33; Rebs: McGrady, Yao 8 each Asts: Tracy McGrady 10	Pts: Dirk Nowitzki 26; Rebs: Erick Dampier 9 Asts: Jason Terry 6
Houston leads series, 2–0

American Airlines Center, Dallas
Attendance: 20,884
Referees: Dan Crawford, Greg Willard, Mark Wunderlich

TNT

April 28
8:30 pm

Recap

Dallas Mavericks 106, Houston Rockets 102
Scoring by quarter: 32–27, 22–22, 24–34, 28–19
Pts: Dirk Nowitzki 28; Rebs: three players 6 each Asts: Daniels, Terry 4 each	Pts: Tracy McGrady 28; Rebs: Bob Sura 11; Asts: McGrady, Sura 6 each
Houston leads series, 2–1

Toyota Center, Houston, Texas
Attendance: 18,199
Referees: Bernie Fryer, Jess Kersey, Scott Foster

TNT

April 30
4:30 pm

Recap

Dallas Mavericks 97, Houston Rockets 93
Scoring by quarter: 26–22, 22–29, 29–26, 20–16
Pts: Jason Terry 32; Rebs: Dirk Nowitzki 7 Asts: Dirk Nowitzki 6	Pts: Tracy McGrady 36; Rebs: Dikembe Mutombo 7 Asts: Tracy McGrady 5
Series tied, 2–2

Toyota Center, Houston, Texas
Attendance: 18,211
Referees: Dick Bavetta, Jim Clark, Luis Grillo

TNT

May 2
9:30 pm

Recap

Houston Rockets 100, Dallas Mavericks 103
Scoring by quarter: 22–24, 22–28, 24–24, 32–27
Pts: Yao Ming 30; Rebs: Tracy McGrady 9 Asts: Tracy McGrady 6	Pts: Dirk Nowitzki 23; Rebs: Dirk Nowitzki 13; Asts: Jason Terry 7
Dallas leads series, 3–2

American Airlines Center, Dallas
Attendance: 20,894
Referees: Bennett Salvatore, Joe DeRosa, Tony Brothers

TNT

May 5
9:30 pm

Recap

Dallas Mavericks 83, Houston Rockets 101
Scoring by quarter: 26–18, 19–34, 25–17, 13–32
Pts: Jerry Stackhouse 21; Rebs: Dirk Nowitzki 13; Asts: Nowitzki, Terry 4 each	Pts: Tracy McGrady 37; Rebs: Dikembe Mutombo 10; Asts: Tracy McGrady 7
Series tied, 3–3

Toyota Center, Houston, Texas
Attendance: 18,215
Referees: Eddie F. Rush, Joe Forte, Sean Corbin

TNT

May 7
9:30 pm

Recap

Houston Rockets 76, Dallas Mavericks 116
Scoring by quarter: 20–32, 24–27, 20–33, 12–24
Pts: Yao Ming 33; Rebs: Yao Ming 10; Asts: Tracy McGrady 7	Pts: Jason Terry 31; Rebs: Dirk Nowitzki 14; Asts: Armstrong Stackhouse 4 each
Dallas wins series, 4–3

American Airlines Center, Dallas
Attendance: 20,884
Referees: Bill Spooner, Ron Garretson, Steve Javie

- The Mavericks become the third team to win a best-of-seven playoff series after losing the first 2 games at home.
- This is the last playoff match-up between Dallas & Houston until 2015.

Regular-season series
Tied 2–2 in the regular-season series

December 2, 2004

Recap

Houston Rockets 106, Dallas Mavericks 113 (OT)

American Airlines Center, Dallas

December 11, 2004

Recap

Dallas Mavericks 102, Houston Rockets 78

Toyota Center, Houston, Texas

January 12, 2005

Recap

Houston Rockets 124, Dallas Mavericks 114

American Airlines Center, Dallas

March 6, 2005

Recap

Dallas Mavericks 69, Houston Rockets 90

Toyota Center, Houston, Texas

This was the second playoff meeting between these two teams, with the Mavericks winning the first meeting.

Previous playoff series
Dallas leads 1–0 in all-time playoff series

1988

Dallas Mavericks 3, Houston Rockets 1

1988 Western Conference First Round

== Conference semifinals ==
=== Eastern Conference semifinals ===
==== (1) Miami Heat vs. (5) Washington Wizards ====
ABC

May 8
3:30 pm

Recap

Washington Wizards 86, Miami Heat 105
Scoring by quarter: 18–26, 29–23, 17–33, 22–23
Pts: Gilbert Arenas 25; Rebs: Antawn Jamison 8 Asts: Larry Hughes 3	Pts: Dwyane Wade 20; Rebs: Eddie Jones 8 Asts: Dwyane Wade 7
Miami leads series, 1–0

American Airlines Arena, Miami
Attendance: 20,151
Referees: Blane Reichelt, Dick Bavetta, Tom Washington

TNT

May 10
7:00 pm

Recap

Washington Wizards 102, Miami Heat 108
Scoring by quarter: 20–30, 27–24, 24–26, 31–28
Pts: Antawn Jamison 32; Rebs: Hughes, Ruffin 8 each Asts: Gilbert Arenas 5	Pts: Dwyane Wade 31; Rebs: Udonis Haslem 13; Asts: Dwyane Wade 15
Miami leads series, 2–0

American Airlines Arena, Miami
Attendance: 20,205
Referees: Eddie F. Rush, Joe DeRosa, Scott Foster

ESPN

May 12
8:00 pm

Recap

Miami Heat 102, Washington Wizards 95
Scoring by quarter: 21–24, 28–27, 30–19, 23–25
Pts: Dwyane Wade 31; Rebs: Alonzo Mourning 13; Asts: D. Jones, Wade 6 each	Pts: Antawn Jamison 21; Rebs: Brendan Haywood 8 Asts: Gilbert Arenas 14
Miami leads series, 3–0

MCI Center, Washington, D.C.
Attendance: 20,173
Referees: Bennett Salvatore, Jess Kersey, Ken Mauer

ABC

May 14
8:00 pm

Recap

Miami Heat 99, Washington Wizards 95
Scoring by quarter: 23–26, 24–25, 40–25, 12–19
Pts: Dwyane Wade 42; Rebs: Udonis Haslem 13; Asts: Damon Jones 6	Pts: Gilbert Arenas 25; Rebs: Brendan Haywood 15; Asts: Larry Hughes 5
Miami wins series, 4–0

MCI Center, Washington, D.C.
Attendance: 20,173
Referees: Dan Crawford, Derrick Stafford, Monty Mccutchen

Regular-season series
Miami won 4–0 in the regular-season series

November 6, 2004

Recap

Miami Heat 118, Washington Wizards 106

MCI Center, Washington, D.C.

November 9, 2004

Recap

Washington Wizards 93, Miami Heat 103

American Airlines Arena, Miami

December 13, 2004

Recap

Washington Wizards 83, Miami Heat 106

American Airlines Arena, Miami

December 15, 2004

Recap

Miami Heat 98, Washington Wizards 93

MCI Center, Washington, D.C.

This was the first playoff meeting between the Wizards and the Heat.

==== (2) Detroit Pistons vs. (6) Indiana Pacers ====
TNT

May 9
8:00 pm

Recap

Indiana Pacers 81, Detroit Pistons 96
Scoring by quarter: 20–23, 18–29, 19–20, 24–24
Pts: Jermaine O'Neal 22; Rebs: Jeff Foster 13; Asts: Johnson, Miller 3 each	Pts: Richard Hamilton 28; Rebs: Ben Wallace 15; Asts: Chauncey Billups 7
Detroit leads series, 1–0

The Palace of Auburn Hills, Auburn Hills, Michigan
Attendance: 22,076
Referees: Bernie Fryer, Jess Kersey, Jim Clark

TNT

May 11
8:00 pm

Recap

Indiana Pacers 92, Detroit Pistons 83
Scoring by quarter: 18–33, 22–17, 28–19, 24–14
Pts: Jermaine O'Neal 22; Rebs: Jeff Foster 20; Asts: Jamaal Tinsley 12	Pts: Tayshaun Prince 24; Rebs: Ben Wallace 16; Asts: Chauncey Billups 10
Series tied, 1–1

The Palace of Auburn Hills, Auburn Hills, Michigan
Attendance: 22,076
Referees: Mike Callahan, Ron Garretson, Sean Corbin

ESPN

May 13
6:00 pm

Recap

Detroit Pistons 74, Indiana Pacers 79
Scoring by quarter: 11–17, 17–25, 17–16, 29–21
Pts: Chauncey Billups 23; Rebs: Ben Wallace 14; Asts: Tayshaun Prince 6	Pts: Reggie Miller 17; Rebs: Jeff Foster 12; Asts: Jamaal Tinsley 6
Indiana leads series, 2–1

Conseco Fieldhouse, Indianapolis
Attendance: 18,345
Referees: Dan Crawford, Joe Forte, Tom Washington

ABC

May 15
2:30 pm

Recap

Detroit Pistons 89, Indiana Pacers 76
Scoring by quarter: 21–13, 26–21, 25–22, 17–20
Pts: Chauncey Billups 29; Rebs: Rasheed Wallace 12; Asts: Richard Hamilton 7	Pts: Stephen Jackson 23; Rebs: Jermaine O'Neal 13; Asts: Anthony Johnson 6
Series tied, 2–2

Conseco Fieldhouse, Indianapolis
Attendance: 18,345
Referees: Bob Delaney, Luis Grillo, Steve Javie

TNT

May 17
7:00 pm

Recap

Indiana Pacers 67, Detroit Pistons 86
Scoring by quarter: 21–23, 14–19, 11–27, 21–17
Pts: Jermaine O'Neal 14; Rebs: Dale Davis 12; Asts: Jamaal Tinsley 5	Pts: Ben Wallace 19; Rebs: Tayshaun Prince 9 Asts: Chauncey Billups 7
Detroit leads series, 3–2

The Palace of Auburn Hills, Auburn Hills, Michigan
Attendance: 22,076
Referees: Eddie F. Rush, Jack Nies, Joe Crawford

ABC

May 19
8:00 pm

Recap

Detroit Pistons 88, Indiana Pacers 79
Scoring by quarter: 19–21, 20–25, 23–17, 26–16
Pts: Richard Hamilton 28; Rebs: B. Wallace, R. Wallace 11 each Asts: Chauncey Billups 8	Pts: Reggie Miller 27; Rebs: Jermaine O'Neal 11; Asts: Jamaal Tinsley 10
Detroit wins series, 4–2

Conseco Fieldhouse, Indianapolis
Attendance: 18,345
Referees: Bennett Salvatore, Bill Spooner, Ken Mauer

- Game 6 is Reggie Miller's final NBA game.
- As of 2026, this remains the most recent playoff match-up between the Pistons & the Pacers.

Regular-season series
Tied 2–2 in the regular-season series

November 19, 2004

Recap

Indiana Pacers 97, Detroit Pistons 82

The Palace of Auburn Hills, Auburn Hills, Michigan

December 25, 2004

Recap

Detroit Pistons 98, Indiana Pacers 93

Conseco Fieldhouse, Indianapolis

January 27, 2005

Recap

Detroit Pistons 88, Indiana Pacers 76

Conseco Fieldhouse, Indianapolis

March 23, 2005

Recap

Indiana Pacers 94, Detroit Pistons 81

The Palace of Auburn Hills, Auburn Hills, Michigan

This was the third playoff meeting between these two teams, with the Pistons winning the first two meetings.

Previous playoff series
Detroit leads 2–0 in all-time playoff series

1990

Detroit Pistons 3, Indiana Pacers 0

1990 Eastern Conference First Round

2004

Detroit Pistons 4, Indiana Pacers 2

2004 Eastern Conference Finals

=== Western Conference semifinals ===
==== (1) Phoenix Suns vs. (4) Dallas Mavericks ====
TNT

May 9
10:30 pm

Recap

Dallas Mavericks 102, Phoenix Suns 127
Scoring by quarter: 22–29, 25–34, 26–36, 29–28
Pts: Dirk Nowitzki 28; Rebs: Dirk Nowitzki 13; Asts: Dirk Nowitzki 4	Pts: Amar'e Stoudemire 40; Rebs: Amar'e Stoudemire 16; Asts: Steve Nash 13
Phoenix leads series, 1–0

America West Arena, Phoenix, Arizona
Attendance: 18,422
Referees: Dan Crawford, Ken Mauer, Monty Mccutchen

TNT

May 11
10:30 pm

Recap

Dallas Mavericks 108, Phoenix Suns 106
Scoring by quarter: 34–22, 20–24, 26–36, 28–24
Pts: Michael Finley 31; Rebs: Dampier, Nowitzki 12 each Asts: Finley, Stackhouse 5 each	Pts: Amar'e Stoudemire 30; Rebs: Amar'e Stoudemire 16; Asts: Steve Nash 13
Series tied, 1–1

America West Arena, Phoenix, Arizona
Attendance: 18,422
Referees: Greg Willard, Dick Bavetta, Tony Brothers

ESPN

May 13
8:30 pm

Recap

Phoenix Suns 119, Dallas Mavericks 102
Scoring by quarter: 27–31, 33–28, 27–23, 32–20
Pts: Amar'e Stoudemire 37; Rebs: Amar'e Stoudemire 14; Asts: Steve Nash 17	Pts: Dirk Nowitzki 21; Rebs: Dirk Nowitzki 13; Asts: Jason Terry 7
Phoenix leads series, 2–1

American Airlines Center, Dallas
Attendance: 20,896
Referees: Eddie F. Rush, Jim Clark, Sean Corbin

TNT

May 15
8:30 pm

Recap

Phoenix Suns 109, Dallas Mavericks 119
Scoring by quarter: 22–30, 28–36, 29–27, 30–26
Pts: Steve Nash 48; Rebs: Shawn Marion 12; Asts: Steve Nash 5	Pts: Josh Howard 29; Rebs: Erick Dampier 11; Asts: Jason Terry 8
Series tied, 2–2

American Airlines Center, Dallas
Attendance: 20,894
Referees: Bennett Salvatore, Joe DeRosa, Mark Wunderlich

TNT

May 18
6:00 pm

Recap

Dallas Mavericks 108, Phoenix Suns 114
Scoring by quarter: 29–25, 26–23, 22–28, 31–38
Pts: Dirk Nowitzki 34; Rebs: Erick Dampier 14; Asts: Jason Terry 8	Pts: Steve Nash 34; Rebs: Amar'e Stoudemire 18; Asts: Steve Nash 12
Phoenix leads series, 3–2

America West Arena, Phoenix, Arizona
Attendance: 18,422
Referees: Mike Callahan, Steve Javie, Tom Washington

ESPN

May 20
8:30 pm

Recap

Phoenix Suns 130, Dallas Mavericks 126 (OT)
Scoring by quarter: 28–32, 25–30, 24–22, 34–27, Overtime: 19–15
Pts: Steve Nash 39; Rebs: Shawn Marion 16; Asts: Steve Nash 12	Pts: Jason Terry 36; Rebs: Josh Howard 14; Asts: Dirk Nowitzki 6
Phoenix wins series, 4–2

American Airlines Center, Dallas
Attendance: 20,915
Referees: Bernie Fryer, Derrick Stafford, Ron Garretson

Regular-season series
Phoenix won 2–1 in the regular-season series

November 16, 2004

Recap

Phoenix Suns 107, Dallas Mavericks 101

American Airlines Center, Dallas

February 17, 2005

Recap

Dallas Mavericks 119, Phoenix Suns 113

America West Arena, Phoenix, Arizona

February 26, 2005

Recap

Phoenix Suns 124, Dallas Mavericks 123

American Airlines Center, Dallas

This was the first playoff meeting between the Suns and the Mavericks.

==== (2) San Antonio Spurs vs. (3) Seattle SuperSonics ====
TNT

May 8
8:00 pm

Recap

Seattle SuperSonics 81, San Antonio Spurs 103
Scoring by quarter: 22–35, 13–27, 22–13, 24–28
Pts: Rashard Lewis 19; Rebs: Collison, Evans 7 each Asts: Luke Ridnour 4	Pts: Tony Parker 29; Rebs: Tim Duncan 9 Asts: Tim Duncan 5
San Antonio leads series, 1–0

SBC Center, San Antonio
Attendance: 18,797
Referees: Bennett Salvatore, David Jones, Derrick Stafford

TNT

May 10
9:30 pm

Recap

Seattle SuperSonics 91, San Antonio Spurs 108
Scoring by quarter: 16–28, 26–26, 23–25, 26–29
Pts: Ray Allen 25; Rebs: Reggie Evans 12; Asts: Antonio Daniels 6	Pts: Manu Ginóbili 28; Rebs: Nazr Mohammed 10; Asts: Tony Parker 7
San Antonio leads series, 2–0

SBC Center, San Antonio
Attendance: 18,797
Referees: Bob Delaney, Dan Crawford, James Capers

ESPN

May 12
7:30 pm

Recap

San Antonio Spurs 91, Seattle SuperSonics 92
Scoring by quarter: 29–21, 22–28, 24–26, 16–17
Pts: Tim Duncan 23; Rebs: Tim Duncan 11; Asts: Tony Parker 8	Pts: Ray Allen 20; Rebs: Rashard Lewis 10; Asts: Ray Allen 7
San Antonio leads series, 2–1

KeyArena, Seattle
Attendance: 17,072
Referees: Bernie Fryer, Jack Nies, Mark Wunderlich

TNT

May 15
4:00 pm

Recap

San Antonio Spurs 89, Seattle SuperSonics 101
Scoring by quarter: 26–28, 14–18, 26–36, 23–19
Pts: Tim Duncan 35; Rebs: Tim Duncan 10; Asts: Bowen, Parker 3 each	Pts: Ray Allen 32; Rebs: three players 6 each Asts: Antonio Daniels 7
Series tied, 2–2

KeyArena, Seattle
Attendance: 17,072
Referees: Bill Spooner, Mike Callahan, Ron Garretson

TNT

May 17
8:30 pm

Recap

Seattle SuperSonics 90, San Antonio Spurs 103
Scoring by quarter: 18–25, 32–25, 18–28, 22–25
Pts: Ray Allen 19; Rebs: Danny Fortson 9 Asts: Ray Allen 6	Pts: Manu Ginóbili 39; Rebs: Tim Duncan 14; Asts: Manu Ginóbili 6
San Antonio leads series, 3–2

SBC Center, San Antonio
Attendance: 18,797
Referees: Blane Reichelt, Dick Bavetta, Luis Grillo

ESPN

May 19
7:30 pm

Recap

San Antonio Spurs 98, Seattle SuperSonics 96
Scoring by quarter: 20–25, 32–22, 20–26, 26–23
Pts: Tim Duncan 26; Rebs: Tim Duncan 9 Asts: Manu Ginóbili 7	Pts: Ray Allen 25; Rebs: Reggie Evans 9 Asts: Antonio Daniels 5
San Antonio wins series, 4–2

KeyArena, Seattle
Attendance: 17,072
Referees: Dan Crawford, Gary Forest, Greg Willard

- Tim Duncan made the series-winning shot with 0.5 seconds left in Game 6.
- Game 6 would be the final NBA playoff game in Seattle.
- This would be the last playoff match-up between the Spurs & Sonics/Thunder until 2012.

Regular-season series
Tied 2–2 in the regular-season series

November 7, 2004

Recap

San Antonio Spurs 94, Seattle SuperSonics 113

KeyArena, Seattle

December 8, 2004

Recap

Seattle SuperSonics 102, San Antonio Spurs 96

SBC Center, San Antonio

January 31, 2005

Recap

San Antonio Spurs 103, Seattle SuperSonics 84

KeyArena, Seattle

March 30, 2005

Recap

Seattle SuperSonics 76, San Antonio Spurs 89

SBC Center, San Antonio

This was the third playoff meeting between these two teams, with the Spurs winning the first two meetings.

Previous playoff series
San Antonio leads 2–0 in all-time playoff series

1982

San Antonio Spurs 4, Seattle SuperSonics 1

1982 Western Conference Semifinals

2002

San Antonio Spurs 3, Seattle SuperSonics 2

2002 Western Conference First Round

== Conference finals ==
=== Eastern Conference finals ===
==== (1) Miami Heat vs. (2) Detroit Pistons ====
TNT

May 23
8:00 pm

Recap

Detroit Pistons 90, Miami Heat 81
Scoring by quarter: 24–25, 20–18, 30–24, 16–14
Pts: Rasheed Wallace 20; Rebs: Ben Wallace 13; Asts: Carlos Arroyo 7	Pts: Eddie Jones 22; Rebs: Eddie Jones 8 Asts: Damon Jones 5
Detroit leads series, 1–0

American Airlines Arena, Miami
Attendance: 20,203
Referees: Bernie Fryer, Bob Delaney, Mike Callahan

TNT

May 25
8:00 pm

Recap

Detroit Pistons 86, Miami Heat 92
Scoring by quarter: 23–24, 13–23, 27–15, 23–30
Pts: Richard Hamilton 21; Rebs: Ben Wallace 14; Asts: Chauncey Billups 6	Pts: Dwyane Wade 40; Rebs: Shaquille O'Neal 10; Asts: Dwyane Wade 6
Series tied, 1–1

American Airlines Arena, Miami
Attendance: 20,228
Referees: Dick Bavetta, Eddie F. Rush, Tom Washington

TNT

May 29
8:00 pm

Recap

Miami Heat 113, Detroit Pistons 104
Scoring by quarter: 22–24, 31–27, 26–24, 34–29
Pts: Dwyane Wade 36; Rebs: D. Jones, Wade 7 each Asts: D. Jones, O'Neal 5 each	Pts: Richard Hamilton 33; Rebs: Rasheed Wallace 8 Asts: Richard Hamilton 5
Miami leads series, 2–1

The Palace of Auburn Hills, Auburn Hills, Michigan
Attendance: 22,076
Referees: Dan Crawford, Greg Willard, Joe Forte

TNT

May 31
8:00 pm

Recap

Miami Heat 96, Detroit Pistons 106
Scoring by quarter: 21–25, 25–35, 23–19, 27–27
Pts: Dwyane Wade 28; Rebs: Eddie Jones 10; Asts: Dwyane Wade 6	Pts: Richard Hamilton 28; Rebs: Ben Wallace 15; Asts: Richard Hamilton 8
Series tied, 2–2

The Palace of Auburn Hills, Auburn Hills, Michigan
Attendance: 22,076
Referees: Derrick Stafford, Jack Nies, Joe Crawford

TNT

June 2
8:00 pm

Recap

Detroit Pistons 76, Miami Heat 88
Scoring by quarter: 26–27, 13–25, 21–20, 16–15
Pts: Richard Hamilton 21; Rebs: Antonio McDyess 9 Asts: Richard Hamilton 5	Pts: Shaquille O'Neal 20; Rebs: Udonis Haslem 13; Asts: Damon Jones 6
Miami leads series, 3–2

American Airlines Arena, Miami
Attendance: 20,225
Referees: Ken Mauer, Ron Garretson, Steve Javie

TNT

June 4
8:00 pm

Recap

Miami Heat 66, Detroit Pistons 91
Scoring by quarter: 16–17, 16–27, 13–24, 21–23
Pts: Shaquille O'Neal 24; Rebs: Shaquille O'Neal 13; Asts: Damon Jones 6	Pts: Richard Hamilton 24; Rebs: Prince, R. Wallace 9 each Asts: Chauncey Billups 7
Series tied, 3–3

The Palace of Auburn Hills, Auburn Hills, Michigan
Attendance: 22,076
Referees: Bennett Salvatore, Bernie Fryer, Dan Crawford

TNT

June 6
8:00 pm

Recap

Detroit Pistons 88, Miami Heat 82
Scoring by quarter: 21–23, 24–17, 19–26, 24–16
Pts: Richard Hamilton 22; Rebs: Ben Wallace 9 Asts: Chauncey Billups 8	Pts: Shaquille O'Neal 27; Rebs: Udonis Haslem 10; Asts: Dwyane Wade 4
Detroit wins series, 4–3

American Airlines Arena, Miami
Attendance: 20,241
Referees: Dick Bavetta, Eddie F. Rush, Joe Crawford

The Pistons beat the Heat in seven games in part because of the comeback mounted in the fourth quarter of Game 7 of the Eastern Finals by Chauncey Billups. Dwyane Wade also missed Game 6 of the series due to a rib injury.

To date, this is the last time the Pistons won the Eastern Conference championship.

Regular-season series
Detroit won 2–1 in the regular-season series

November 26, 2004

Recap

Miami Heat 77, Detroit Pistons 78

The Palace of Auburn Hills, Auburn Hills, Michigan

December 30, 2004

Recap

Miami Heat 89, Detroit Pistons 78

The Palace of Auburn Hills, Auburn Hills, Michigan

April 10, 2005

Recap

Detroit Pistons 80, Miami Heat 72

American Airlines Arena, Miami

This was the second playoff meeting between these two teams, with the Heat winning the first meeting.

Previous playoff series
Miami leads 1–0 in all-time playoff series

2000

Detroit Pistons 0, Miami Heat 3

2000 Eastern Conference First Round

=== Western Conference finals ===
==== (1) Phoenix Suns vs. (2) San Antonio Spurs ====
ABC

May 22
12:30 pm

Recap

San Antonio Spurs 121, Phoenix Suns 114
Scoring by quarter: 30–20, 25–29, 23–33, 43–32
Pts: Tony Parker 29; Rebs: Tim Duncan 15; Asts: Manu Ginóbili 5	Pts: Amar'e Stoudemire 41; Rebs: Marion, Stoudemire 9 each Asts: Steve Nash 13
San Antonio leads series, 1–0

America West Arena, Phoenix, Arizona
Attendance: 18,422
Referees: Jack Nies, Jim Clark, Joe Crawford

ESPN

May 24
6:00 pm

Recap

San Antonio Spurs 111, Phoenix Suns 108
Scoring by quarter: 31–21, 22–33, 27–31, 31–23
Pts: Tim Duncan 30; Rebs: Duncan, Mohammed 8 each Asts: Tony Parker 5	Pts: Amar'e Stoudemire 37; Rebs: Shawn Marion 12; Asts: Steve Nash 15
San Antonio leads series, 2–0

America West Arena, Phoenix, Arizona
Attendance: 18,422
Referees: Bennett Salvatore, Bill Spooner, Ken Mauer

ESPN

May 28
8:00 pm

Recap

Phoenix Suns 92, San Antonio Spurs 102
Scoring by quarter: 29–38, 10–18, 24–24, 29–22
Pts: Amar'e Stoudemire 34; Rebs: Amar'e Stoudemire 11; Asts: Johnson, Nash 3 each	Pts: Tim Duncan 33; Rebs: Tim Duncan 15; Asts: Tony Parker 7
San Antonio leads series, 3–0

SBC Center, San Antonio
Attendance: 18,797
Referees: Derrick Stafford, Ron Garretson Steve Javie

ABC

May 30
7:30 pm

Recap

Phoenix Suns 111, San Antonio Spurs 106
Scoring by quarter: 26–23, 26–36, 35–21, 24–26
Pts: Amar'e Stoudemire 31; Rebs: Shawn Marion 14; Asts: Steve Nash 12	Pts: Manu Ginóbili 28; Rebs: Tim Duncan 16; Asts: Manu Ginóbili 7
San Antonio leads series, 3–1

SBC Center, San Antonio
Attendance: 18,797
Referees: Bernie Fryer, Joe DeRosa, Mike Callahan

ESPN

June 1
6:00 pm

Recap

San Antonio Spurs 101, Phoenix Suns 95
Scoring by quarter: 24–24, 25–26, 29–20, 23–25
Pts: Tim Duncan 31; Rebs: Tim Duncan 15; Asts: Manu Ginóbili 6	Pts: Amar'e Stoudemire 42; Rebs: Amar'e Stoudemire 16; Asts: Steve Nash 10
San Antonio wins series, 4–1

America West Arena, Phoenix, Arizona
Attendance: 18,422
Referees: Dick Bavetta, Eddie F. Rush, Greg Willard

Regular-season series
San Antonio won 2–1 in the regular-season series

December 28, 2004

Recap

Phoenix Suns 94, San Antonio Spurs 115

SBC Center, San Antonio

January 21, 2005

Recap

San Antonio Spurs 128, Phoenix Suns 123 (OT)

America West Arena, Phoenix, Arizona

March 9, 2005

Recap

San Antonio Spurs 101, Phoenix Suns 107

America West Arena, Phoenix, Arizona

This was the seventh playoff meeting between these two teams, with each team winning three series apiece.

Previous playoff series
Tied 3–3 in all-time playoff series

1992

Phoenix Suns 3, San Antonio Spurs 0

1992 Western Conference First Round

1993

Phoenix Suns 4, San Antonio Spurs 2

1993 Western Conference Semifinals

1996

Phoenix Suns 1, San Antonio Spurs 3

1996 Western Conference First Round

1998

Phoenix Suns 1, San Antonio Spurs 3

1998 Western Conference First Round

2000

Phoenix Suns 3, San Antonio Spurs 1

2000 Western Conference First Round

2003

Phoenix Suns 2, San Antonio Spurs 4

2003 Western Conference First Round

== NBA Finals: (W2) San Antonio Spurs vs. (E2) Detroit Pistons ==
All times are in Eastern Daylight Time (UTC−4)

ABC

June 9
8:00 pm

Recap

Detroit Pistons 69, San Antonio Spurs 84
Scoring by quarter: 20–17, 17–18, 14–20, 18–29
Pts: Chauncey Billups 25; Rebs: Ben Wallace 8 Asts: Chauncey Billups 6	Pts: Manu Ginóbili 26; Rebs: Tim Duncan 17; Asts: Horry, Parker 3 each
San Antonio leads series, 1–0

SBC Center, San Antonio
Attendance: 18,797
Referees: Steve Javie, Ron Garretson, Mike Callahan

ABC

June 12
8:00 pm

Recap

Detroit Pistons 76, San Antonio Spurs 97
Scoring by quarter: 19–30, 23–28, 21–21, 13–18
Pts: Antonio McDyess 15; Rebs: B. Wallace, R. Wallace 8 each Asts: Rasheed Wallace 4	Pts: Manu Ginóbili 27; Rebs: Tim Duncan 11; Asts: Manu Ginóbili 7
San Antonio leads series, 2–0

SBC Center, San Antonio
Attendance: 18,797
Referees: Bernie Fryer, Dan Crawford, Jack Nies

ABC

June 14
9:00 pm

Recap

San Antonio Spurs 79, Detroit Pistons 96
Scoring by quarter: 27–21, 15–20, 23–29, 14–26
Pts: Tony Parker 21; Rebs: Tim Duncan 10; Asts: Duncan, Parker 4 each	Pts: Richard Hamilton 24; Rebs: Ben Wallace 11; Asts: Chauncey Billups 7
San Antonio leads series, 2–1

The Palace of Auburn Hills, Auburn Hills, Michigan
Attendance: 22,076
Referees: Bennett Salvatore, Bob Delaney, Joe Crawford

ABC

June 16
9:00 pm

Recap

San Antonio Spurs 71, Detroit Pistons 102
Scoring by quarter: 17–23, 19–28, 21–23, 14–28
Pts: Tim Duncan 16; Rebs: Tim Duncan 16; Asts: Bowen, Parker 4 each	Pts: Billups, Hunter 17 each Rebs: Ben Wallace 13; Asts: Chauncey Billups 7
Series tied, 2–2

The Palace of Auburn Hills, Auburn Hills, Michigan
Attendance: 22,076
Referees: Dick Bavetta, Eddie F. Rush, Joe DeRosa

ABC

June 19
9:00 pm

Recap

San Antonio Spurs 96, Detroit Pistons 95 (OT)
Scoring by quarter: 21–23, 21–19, 22–21, 25–26, Overtime: 7–6
Pts: Tim Duncan 26; Rebs: Tim Duncan 19; Asts: Manu Ginóbili 9	Pts: Chauncey Billups 34; Rebs: Ben Wallace 12; Asts: Chauncey Billups 7
San Antonio leads series, 3–2

The Palace of Auburn Hills, Auburn Hills, Michigan
Attendance: 22,076
Referees: Mike Callahan, Ron Garretson, Steve Javie

ABC

June 21
8:00 pm

Recap

Detroit Pistons 95, San Antonio Spurs 86
Scoring by quarter: 23–23, 23–24, 25–20, 24–19
Pts: Richard Hamilton 23; Rebs: Ben Wallace 9 Asts: Chauncey Billups 6	Pts: Duncan, Ginóbili 21 each Rebs: Tim Duncan 15; Asts: Tony Parker 5
Series tied, 3–3

SBC Center, San Antonio
Attendance: 18,797
Referees: Bennett Salvatore, Bernie Fryer, Dan Crawford

ABC

June 23
8:00 pm

Recap

Detroit Pistons 74, San Antonio Spurs 81
Scoring by quarter: 16–18, 23–20, 18–19, 17–24
Pts: Richard Hamilton 15; Rebs: Ben Wallace 11; Asts: Chauncey Billups 8	Pts: Tim Duncan 25; Rebs: Tim Duncan 11; Asts: Manu Ginóbili 4
San Antonio wins series, 4–3

SBC Center, San Antonio
Attendance: 18,797
Referees: Dick Bavetta, Eddie F. Rush, Joe Crawford

Regular-season series
Tied 1–1 in the regular-season series

December 3, 2004

Recap

Detroit Pistons 77, San Antonio Spurs 80

SBC Center, San Antonio

March 20, 2005

Recap

San Antonio Spurs 101, Detroit Pistons 110

The Palace of Auburn Hills, Auburn Hills, Michigan

This was the first playoff meeting between the Pistons and the Spurs.

- Robert Horry hit the game-winning shot with 5.9 seconds left in Game 5.

The Finals were broadcast in the United States on ABC and in Canada on TSN. For a list of international broadcasters see the NBA international TV site. Jennifer Lopez's "Get Right" music video became the anthem song for the playoffs and the conclusion song at the end of the regular season.

== Statistical leaders ==
Category	Game high			Average			
Category	Player	Team	High	Player	Team	Avg.	GP
Points	Steve Nash	Phoenix Suns	48	Allen Iverson	Philadelphia 76ers	31.2	5
Rebounds	Jeff Foster	Indiana Pacers	20	Samuel Dalembert	Philadelphia 76ers	12.8	5
Assists	Steve Nash	Phoenix Suns	17	Steve Nash	Phoenix Suns	11.3	15
Steals	Gilbert Arenas	Washington Wizards	6	Andre Iguodala	Philadelphia 76ers	2.8	5
Blocks	Ben Wallace	Detroit Pistons	7	Marcus Camby	Denver Nuggets	3.2	5
