= History of the Oklahoma City Thunder =

The Oklahoma City Thunder is an American professional basketball team based in Oklahoma City, Oklahoma. It was established in 2008 when the Sonics left Seattle.

== 1967–2008: Original Seattle SuperSonics ==
The Thunder's previous incarnation, the Seattle SuperSonics, was formed in 1967. In 41 seasons in Seattle, the SuperSonics compiled a 1745–1585 (.524) win–loss record in the regular season and went 107–110 (.493) in the playoffs. The franchise's titles include three Western Conference championships and one NBA title in 1979.

In 2006, Howard Schultz sold the SuperSonics for $350 million to a group of Oklahoma City investors led by Clay Bennett, a move approved by NBA owners the following October. In 2007, Bennett announced that the franchise would move to Oklahoma City as soon as the lease with KeyArena expired.

In June 2008, a lawsuit brought by the City of Seattle against Bennett due to his attempts to break the final two years of the Sonics' lease at KeyArena went to federal court. Nearly a month later, the two sides reached a settlement agreement. The terms awarded the city $45 million to get out of the remaining lease at KeyArena, and could provide an additional $30 million payment to Seattle in 2013 if certain conditions are met. The owners agreed to leave the SuperSonics name, logo and colors in Seattle for a possible future NBA franchise; however, the items would remain the property of the Oklahoma City team along with other "assets," including championship banners and trophies. On September 3, 2008, the team name, logo, and colors for the Oklahoma City franchise were revealed to the public. The name "Thunder" was chosen due to Oklahoma being a frequent victim of powerful storms due to its location in Tornado Alley, and Oklahoma City housing the 45th Infantry Division, the Thunderbirds.

== 2008–2016: Durant and Westbrook era ==
=== 2008–2009: Inaugural season in Oklahoma City ===
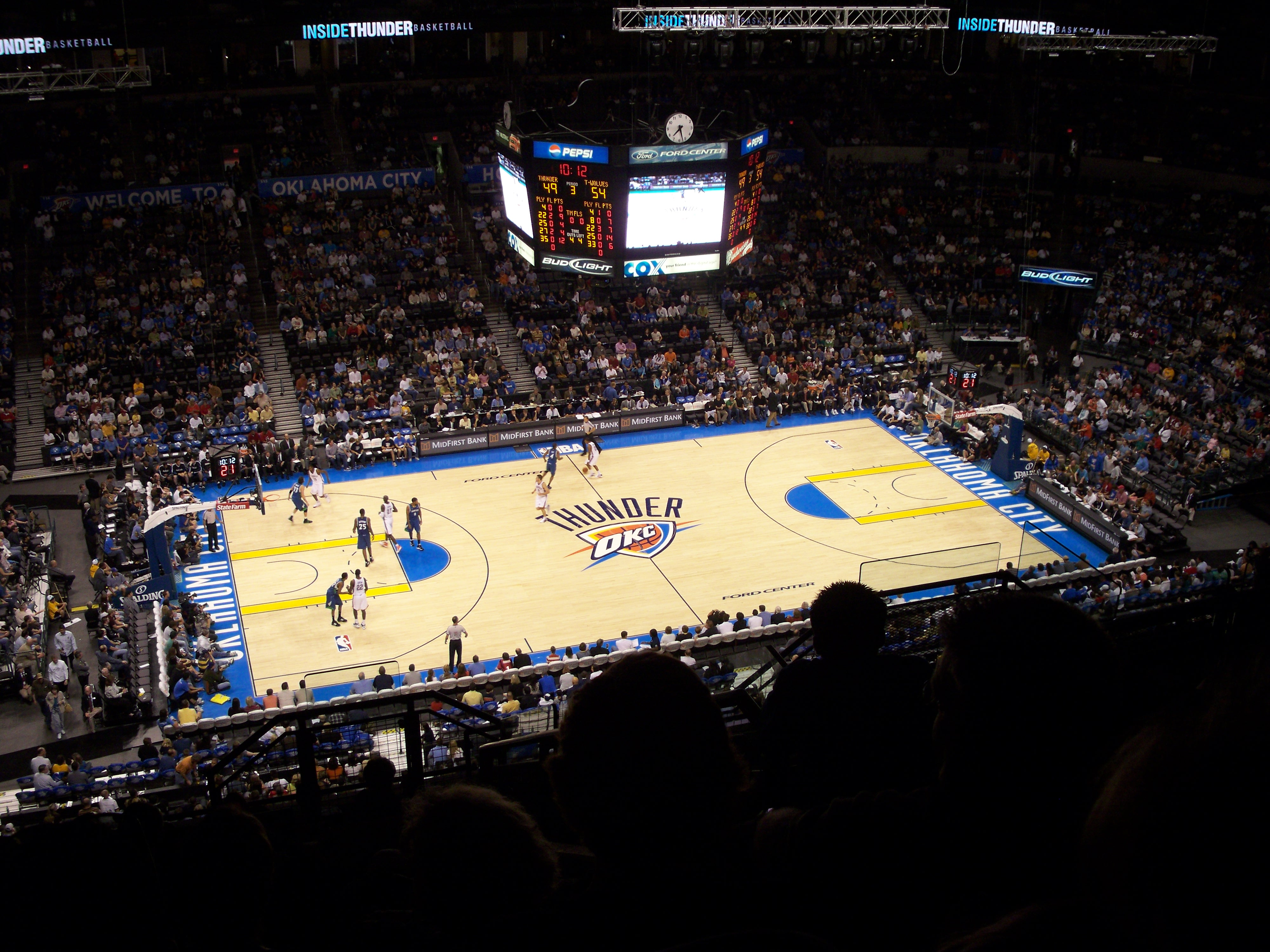
Oklahoma City defeated Minnesota on November 2, 2008, for their first win.

The Thunder participated in the Orlando Pro Summer League featuring their second-year players, potential free agents and rookies. The players wore generic black and white jerseys reading "OKC-NBA" against an outline of a basketball which were also used to represent the team in the video game NBA Live 09. The Thunder's temporary practice facility was the Sawyer Center at Southern Nazarene University, which had been used by the New Orleans Hornets when they relocated to Oklahoma City after Hurricane Katrina.

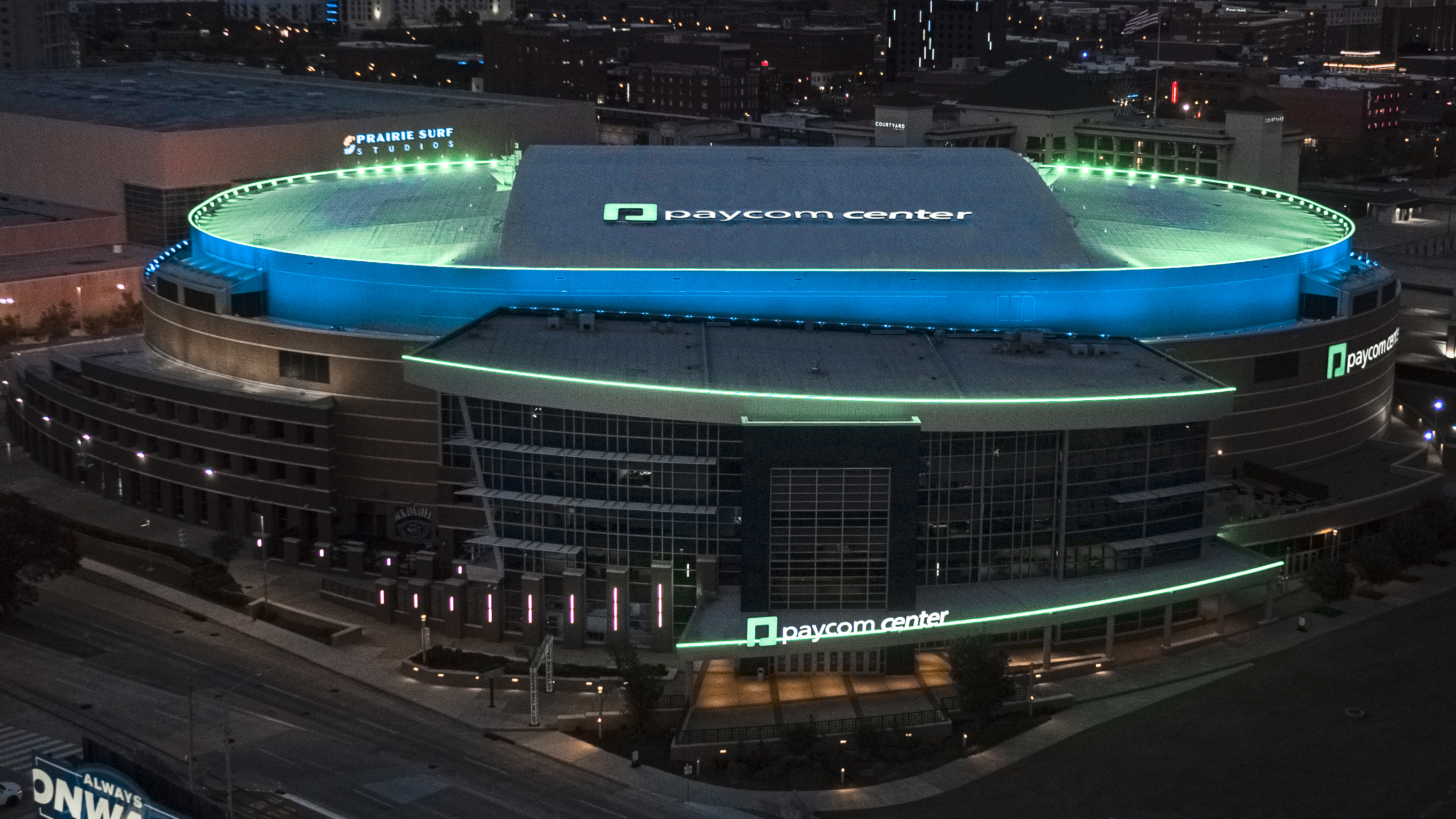
Paycom Center began hosting the Oklahoma City Thunder in 2008, then known as the Ford Center.

The Thunder played several preseason games before the 2008–2009 regular season, but only one of those games was in Oklahoma City. The Thunder made their first appearance in Billings, Montana, on October 8, 2008, in an 88–82 preseason loss against the Minnesota Timberwolves. The Thunder played their first Ford Center game on October 14 against the Los Angeles Clippers.

In their regular-season home opener, the Thunder faced (and lost to) the Milwaukee Bucks. Earl Watson scored the first points of the season with a layup. Three nights later on November 2, the Thunder won their first game by defeating the Timberwolves, improving their record to 1–3. The team then went on a 10-game losing streak before deciding on November 22 to fire head coach P. J. Carlesimo and assistant Paul Westhead. Assistant coach Scott Brooks then took over on an interim basis. Oklahoma City lost its next four games to tie the franchise losing streak of 14 set in Seattle the previous season. But the team managed to prevent history by winning their next game on the road against the Memphis Grizzlies.

As the season continued, the Thunder began to improve. After starting 3–29, the Thunder finished the regular season 20–30 for the remaining fifty games. Not only were they winning more often, they played much more competitively than in the first part of the season. The team brought their record to 23–59 and improved upon their record of 20–62 from the team's final season in Seattle. The late-season successes of the Thunder contributed to the signing of Scott Brooks as the team's official head coach.

After moving to Oklahoma City from Seattle, the team's operating situation improved markedly. In December 2008, Forbes magazine estimated the team's franchise value at $300 million – a 12 percent increase from the previous year's $268 million, when the club was located in Seattle. Forbes also noted an increase in percentage of available tickets sold, from 78 percent in the team's last season in Seattle to 100 percent in 2008–09.

==== 2009–10: The turnaround season ====
After an inaugural season filled with many adjustments, the Thunder hoped to improve during their second season in Oklahoma City. Oklahoma City did not make any major moves in the offseason, other than drafting James Harden from Arizona State University with the third overall pick in the NBA draft. The Thunder selected Rodrigue Beaubois with the 25th pick in the 2009 draft before immediately trading him to the Dallas Mavericks for the 24th pick, center Byron Mullens from Ohio State University. The team then added veteran center Etan Thomas and guard Kevin Ollie. The last major change to their roster occurred on December 22, 2009, when the team traded for Eric Maynor from the Utah Jazz. Maynor immediately supplanted Ollie as the backup point guard.

From the outset the young team looked determined and cohesive. The increasing leadership of Kevin Durant, along with the growing experience of the Thunder's younger players (including future All-Stars Russell Westbrook, James Harden and Serge Ibaka), were signs of the Thunder's improvement. The 2009–10 season included several victories over the NBA's elite teams, including a 28-point blowout over the Eastern Conference champion Orlando Magic and a 16-point blowout of the reigning NBA champion Los Angeles Lakers. Road victories over the San Antonio Spurs, Utah Jazz, Miami Heat, Boston Celtics and Dallas Mavericks further enhanced their reputation. Though they hovered around .500 for the first half of the season, they went on a 9-game winning streak that sent them into serious playoff contention. Kevin Durant became the youngest player in league history to win the scoring title, averaging 30.1 points per game while playing in all 82 games.

The Thunder finished 50–32, more than doubling their win total from the previous season. The 50–32 tied with the 2008 Denver Nuggets as the best 8th seed in the modern Playoffs era, at least in terms of record. The Oklahoma City Thunder also had the same record as the Boston Celtics in this season. They finished fourth in the Northwest Division and eighth in the Western Conference playoff standings, and earned a spot in the 2010 NBA Playoffs. On April 22, the team secured their first playoff win in Oklahoma City when they defeated the defending-champion Los Angeles Lakers 101–96. This was also the Thunder's first playoff win at the Ford Center. However, the Thunder tied the series at 2 games each, but the Lakers won the last 2 games in the series to win it 4–2.

Oklahoma City ranked twelfth in overall attendance in the NBA, and seventh in percentage of available seats occupied (98 percent, including 28 sellouts in 41 home games). The team's operating situation also continued to improve in 2009–10. Forbes magazine estimated the team's franchise value at $310 million (an increase of $10 million over the prior year) with an estimated operating profit of $12.7 million (the first operating profit in years for the franchise).

==== 2010–11: Rise to contention ====
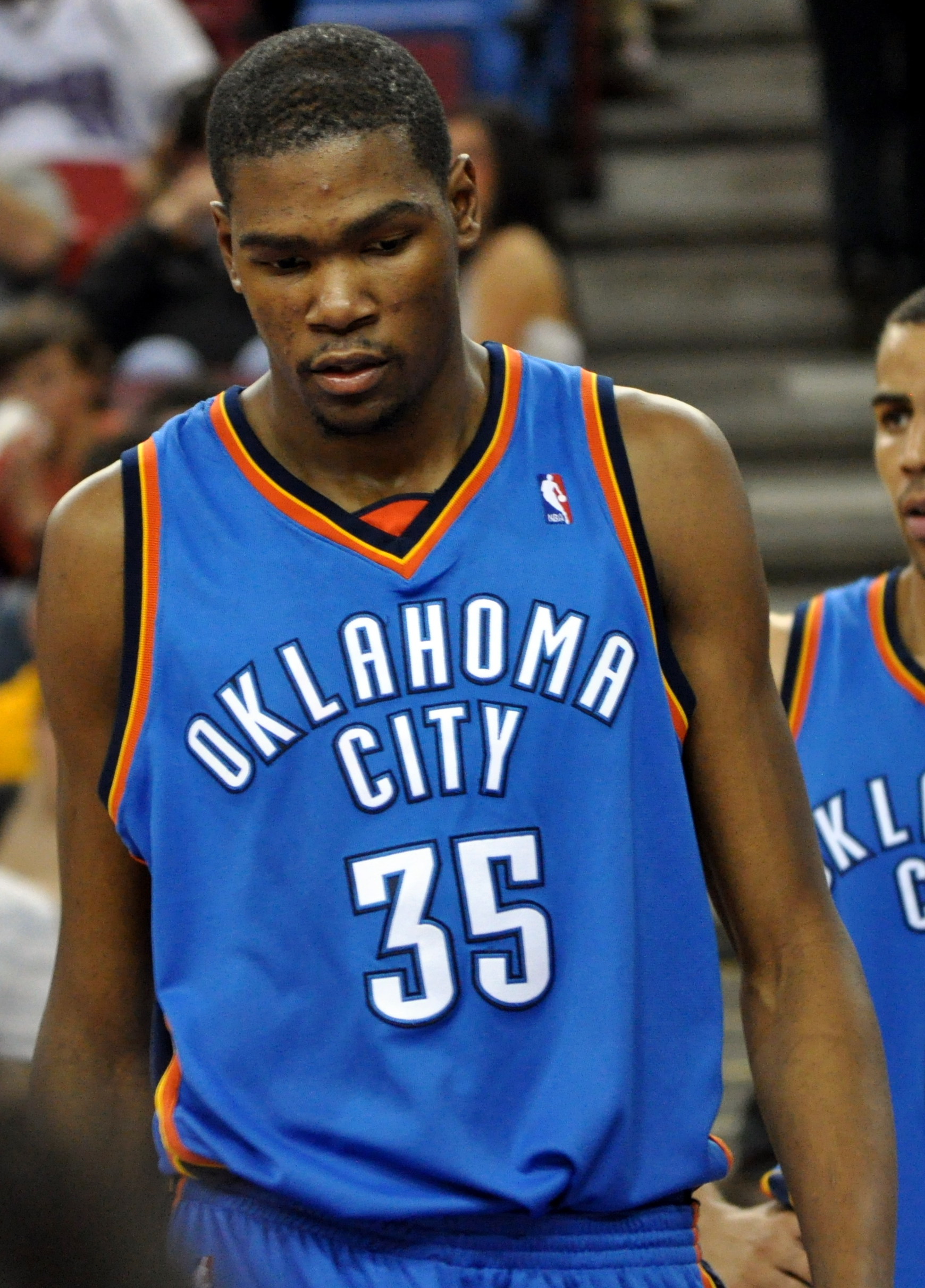
Kevin Durant

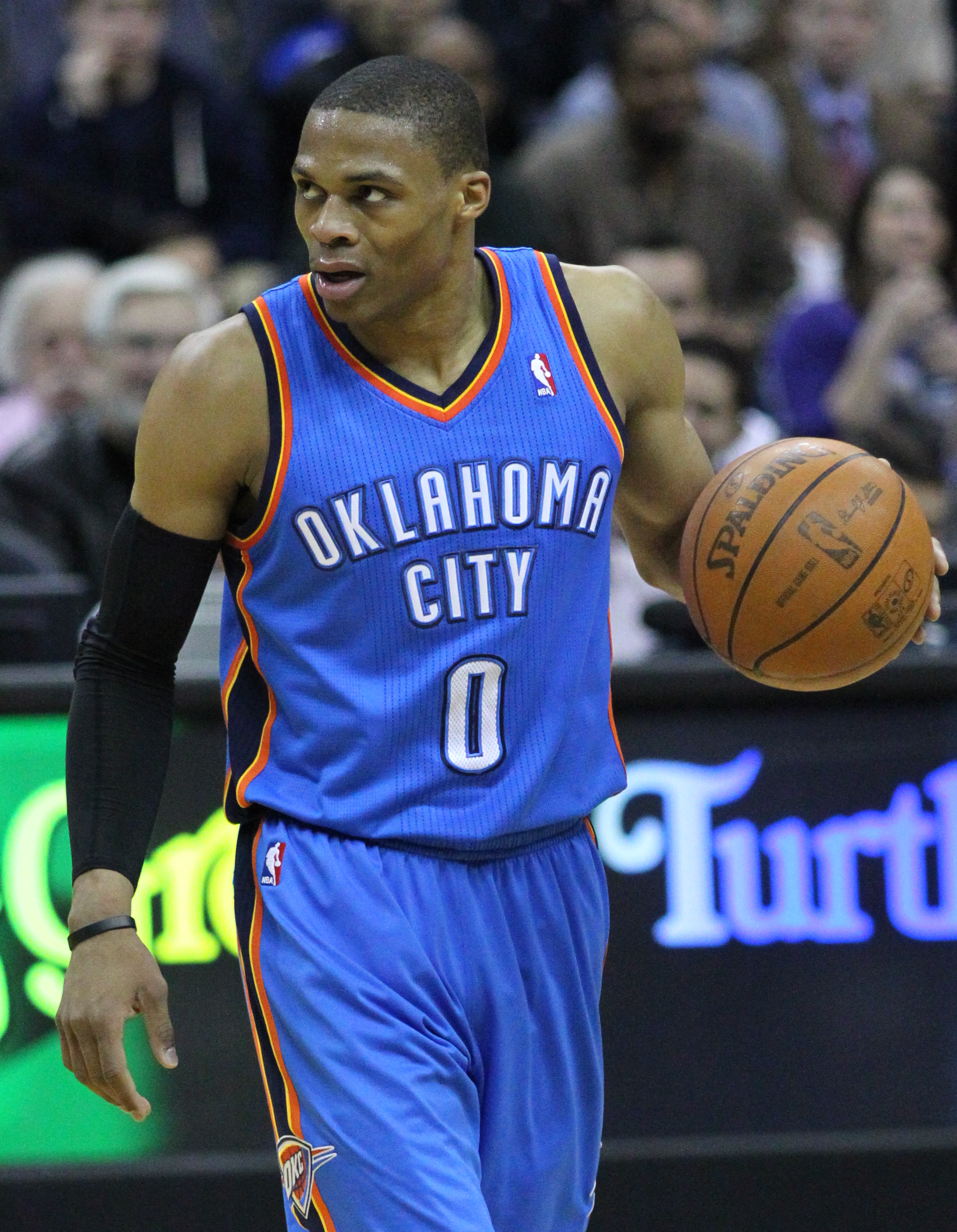
Russell Westbrook

Financially, the Thunder organization continued to build on the positive returns experienced from relocating from Seattle to Oklahoma City. In January 2011, Forbes magazine estimated the franchise's worth at $329 million, up six percent from 2009 to 2010 and ranking No. 18 in the NBA. The magazine also estimated the franchise's revenue at $118 million and operating profit at $22.6 million – up 6.3 percent and 78 percent, respectively, from the previous year. The Thunder finished the 2010–2011 season with a 55–27 record, a five-win increase from their breakout season the previous year. The team also captured their first division title since moving to Oklahoma City, and seventh in franchise history.

In the wake of a fourth-seed versus fifth-seed match-up against the Denver Nuggets, Kevin Durant scored 41 points in Game 1 to set a new career playoff high. In the final game of the series, he again scored 41 and forward Serge Ibaka nearly tied the record for most blocks in a playoff game (10, set by Mark Eaton, Hakeem Olajuwon and Andrew Bynum) with 9 blocks. The Thunder won the series 4 games to 1 and were set to face off against the Memphis Grizzlies who achieved an eight-seed upset over the San Antonio Spurs just days before. The Thunder advanced to the Western Conference Finals with a seven-game series triumph over the Grizzlies. Durant was again the star, scoring 39 points in the clinching Game 7, while Russell Westbrook also had a triple-double. Despite hard-fought battles with the eventual NBA champs, the Thunder fell to the Dallas Mavericks 4–1 in the Western Conference Finals. The Thunder had a chance to tie the series in Game 4, but they were unable to hold a 15-point lead with five minutes remaining in the fourth quarter. They ended up losing in overtime by the score of 112–105.

=== 2011–12: Playing in the NBA Finals ===
During the extended lockout, Thunder players played in exhibition games and even local pickup games to stay in shape. When the abbreviated training camp began, Oklahoma City started with an intact roster and all players, except for Russell Westbrook. In addition, Kendrick Perkins lost more than 30 pounds during the lockout. The Thunder made their two pre-season appearances, after the lockout, against the Dallas Mavericks, winning both games. They won their first regular-season game against Orlando at home and went on a five-game winning streak. Kevin Durant became the sixth player to score 30 or more points in four consecutive games at the start of a season. In addition, the Thunder was the first to sweep their back-to-back-to-back games, winning a home-and-home series with the Houston Rockets, then routing the San Antonio Spurs. Thunder players Durant, Westbrook, Harden, Perkins, and Ibaka made it onto the 2012 All-Star ballots. After the Thunder's win over the Utah Jazz on February 11, 2012, Scott Brooks was named the Head Coach of the Western Conference All-Star squad for the 2012 NBA All-Star Game in Orlando, Florida.

In the 2012 NBA Playoffs, the Thunder swept the defending champion Dallas Mavericks in the first round to advance and face off against their first-round foes from 2010, the Los Angeles Lakers. They defeated the Lakers in five games and advanced to play the San Antonio Spurs in the Western Conference Finals. The Thunder lost the first two games against the Spurs but won the next three including a Game 5 road win, to take a commanding 3–2 game lead in the series. In Game 6, the Thunder defeated the Spurs 107–99 and advanced to the 2012 NBA Finals. Durant led the way with 34 points, playing all of regulation time in the game. In the 2012 NBA Finals against the Miami Heat, the Thunder won the first game at home but then lost four in a row and lost the series in five games.

=== 2012–13: After Harden ===
In the 2012 NBA draft, the Thunder selected Baylor University forward Perry Jones III with the 28th overall pick. The Thunder also signed free agents Hasheem Thabeet and Daniel Orton, and signed guards Andy Rautins and DeAndre Liggins. They re-signed forward Serge Ibaka to a four-year, $48 million extension. After failing to sign James Harden to an extension that was reportedly worth four years and $52 million, the team decided to trade Harden rather than having to pay the luxury tax penalty. On October 27, 2012, the Thunder traded Harden along with center Cole Aldrich and forwards Daequan Cook and Lazar Hayward to the Houston Rockets for Kevin Martin, Jeremy Lamb, first-round draft picks from Toronto and Dallas, and one second-round draft pick. Martin took over Harden's sixth-man role for the season. The Thunder finished with a 60–22 regular season, taking both the Northwest division title and top seed of the Western Conference. In the first round of the playoffs, they faced the 8th-seeded Houston Rockets, featuring former team member James Harden. In game 2 of the series, Russell Westbrook was struck by Rockets point guard Patrick Beverley, and fell down with an injury and missed the rest of the playoffs after having knee surgery. Without the team's second-leading scorer, the Thunder, who had a 3–0 lead, lost the next two games to bring the series to 3–2. In game 6, the Thunder defeated the Rockets to advance to the second round, facing a rematch of the 2011 second round, with the Memphis Grizzlies. The Thunder lost the series 4–1, losing four straight games after winning Game 1 at home.

=== 2013–14: Durant's MVP campaign ===
In the 2013 NBA draft, the Thunder selected 12th pick Steven Adams, traded for the 26th pick Andre Roberson, and selected 47th pick Grant Jerrett. Kevin Martin's contract expired, and he soon signed with the Timberwolves. In addition to Oklahoma City's off-season movements, they signed free agent Ryan Gomes and re-signed Derek Fisher. The team finished second in the conference to San Antonio with a 59–23 record. They met the Memphis Grizzlies for the third time in the playoffs. It also sparked a news article which reportedly called Durant "Mr. Unreliable". The series set a record for most consecutive overtimes in a series with four.

==== 2014–15: Injuries, missed the playoffs ====
With the 21st and 29th picks in the NBA draft, the Thunder selected Mitch McGary from Michigan and Josh Huestis from Stanford. "He brings energy, passion, and great basketball IQ and toughness what we value" said Presti on drafting McGary. Oklahoma City also signed Semaj Christon in the draft. On July 3, the Thunder signed Sebastian Telfair. But they lost shooting guard Thabo Sefolosha as his contract expired and he agreed to a three-year, $12 million contract with the Atlanta Hawks. Several weeks before the season started, the Thunder suffered a setback as Durant was diagnosed with a Jones fracture in his right foot and missed the first 17 games of the season. During the opening game against the Portland Trail Blazers, Westbrook scored 38 points, but found himself sidelined due to a small fracture in his right hand. He missed 16 games, during which Oklahoma City went 4–12. During the middle of the season Westbrook and Durant both came back, and similarly suffered more injuries. Durant was ruled out of the rest of the season in March, deciding to have foot surgery. Westbrook also had to undergo surgery in early March, to repair a fracture in the zygomatic arch bone of his right cheek. Several days later he returned and recorded several triple-doubles on his way to Western Conference Player of the Month honors from February to April. He also won the 2014–2015 NBA scoring title. However, despite the effort, the Thunder missed the playoffs due to a tiebreaker with the New Orleans Pelicans, and Westbrook fell short of the MVP award, finishing fourth in voting. They finished with a 45–37 record. On April 22, 2015, Scott Brooks was fired as the Thunder head coach. Billy Donovan was hired on April 30, 2015. This is Donovan's first major NBA coaching job, after he initially accepted and then left the Orlando Magic job in 2007.

==== 2015–16: Durant's final season in Oklahoma City ====
The Thunder finished the season 55–27 as the 3rd-seed in the Western Conference. In the first round of the Playoffs the Thunder easily beat the Dallas Mavericks in a 4–1 series victory. The Oklahoma City Thunder continued onto the Western Conference Finals in the NBA Playoffs, but giving up a 3–1 lead against the 73-win Golden State Warriors.

== 2016–2019: The Russell Wesbrook era ==
=== 2016–2017: Durant's departure and Westbrook's MVP season ===
After much speculation on the future of free agent superstar Kevin Durant, he announced on July 4, 2016, that he was joining the Warriors. The move to join the 73-win team from last season was heavily criticized by the public and sports media, with many comparing the move to LeBron James' 2010 off-season departure from Cleveland to the Miami Heat. On July 7, Durant was officially introduced by the Warriors organization and signed a two-year, $54.3 million contract, with a player option after the first year.

On August 4, 2016, Westbrook agreed to a three-year extension to remain with the Thunder. With an average of 31.6 points, 10.4 assists, and 10.7 rebounds, Westbrook became the first player since Oscar Robertson to average a triple-double for an entire NBA regular season, and only the second in NBA history (the other being Robertson). On April 2, 2017, Westbrook tied Oscar Robertson's record for most triple-doubles in an NBA season (41); he broke the record on April 9 against the Denver Nuggets, marking his 42nd triple-double of the season. Westbrook, in that game, also hit the game winning buzzer beater from 36 feet, ending the Nuggets' playoffs hopes and securing the Thunder's 3rd seed matchup with the Houston Rockets in the NBA playoffs. Oklahoma City lost the playoff series in the first round to the Houston Rockets 4–1. Despite the team's loss, Westbrook averaged a +14 while on the court and a triple-double during the series and was named league MVP after the season.

==== 2017–2019: Arrival of Paul George ====
In the 2017 NBA draft, the Thunder selected guard Terrance Ferguson with the 21st pick, and signed him to a four-year rookie-scale contract.

To further bolster the roster and improve Westbrook's supporting cast, the Thunder's front office made a series of aggressive moves to reshape the team. On July 6, 2017, the Thunder acquired four-time All-Star forward Paul George in a trade with the Indiana Pacers in exchange for guard Victor Oladipo and forward Domantas Sabonis. The team then signed veteran point guard Raymond Felton and sharp-shooting power forward Patrick Patterson in free agency on July 10. Finally, on September 25, the Thunder acquired ten-time All-Star forward Carmelo Anthony from the New York Knicks in exchange for center Enes Kanter, forward Doug McDermott, and a 2018 second round draft pick they had previously acquired from the Chicago Bulls in the Cameron Payne trade. On September 29, 2017, the Thunder signed Russell Westbrook to a five-year extension. The Thunder finished the 2017–18 season with a 48–34 record and lost to the Utah Jazz 4–2 in the first round of the playoffs.

In the 2018 NBA draft, the Thunder selected guard Devon Hall with the 53rd pick and forward Kevin Hervey with the 57th pick. Devon Hall did not sign with the Thunder, instead signing with the Cairns Taipans of the Australian National Basketball League. Kevin Hervey signed with the Thunder's NBA G-League affiliate, Oklahoma City Blue. Additionally, the Thunder traded a 2019 second-round pick to acquire Hamidou Diallo, who had been selected by the Brooklyn Nets with the 45th pick. Diallo signed a three-year contract with the Thunder.

On July 6, 2018, Paul George re-signed with the Thunder. In July 2018, the Thunder traded forward Carmelo Anthony and a 2022 protected first-round pick to the Atlanta Hawks in a three-way trade. In the trade, the Thunder acquired guard Dennis Schroder from the Atlanta Hawks and forward Timothe Luwawu-Cabarrot from the Philadelphia 76ers. The Thunder also acquired guard Deonte Burton, signing him to a two-way contract with the Oklahoma City Blue. Additionally, the Thunder acquired center Nerlens Noel in free agency, and traded for Abdel Nader from the Boston Celtics.

== 2019–present: Shai Gilgeous-Alexander era ==
=== 2019–2020: Westbrook's departure and Chris Paul's arrival ===
General manager Sam Presti traded Paul George to the Los Angeles Clippers on July 10, 2019. In return, they received Danilo Gallinari, Shai Gilgeous-Alexander, and a record collection of future first-round draft picks. It was reported after the trade was announced that George had privately requested the trade to the Clippers as a result of superstar free agent Kawhi Leonard convincing George to team up with him on the Clippers. They also traded forward Jerami Grant to the Denver Nuggets for a 2020 protected first-round pick.

After the George trade, general manager Presti sensed that the future of the franchise was in jeopardy as the team could not seriously contend with Westbrook as the lone star. On July 16, the Thunder traded Westbrook to the Houston Rockets. In exchange, the Thunder received Chris Paul, two future first-round draft picks, and the rights to two future pick swaps with the Rockets.

Paul made the 2020 NBA All-Star Game as a reserve, making it his tenth selection, and his first since 2016.

Following the suspension of the 2019–20 NBA season, the Thunder were one of the 22 teams invited to the NBA Bubble to participate in the final 8 games of the regular season.

=== 2020–2023: Young core rebuild ===
Following the season, Billy Donovan's contract was not renewed, and both sides agreed to mutually part ways. On November 11, 2020, Mark Daigneault was promoted from the assistant coach position to become the new head coach.

Before the start of the 2020–21 NBA season, Chris Paul was traded to the Phoenix Suns for Kelly Oubre Jr., Ricky Rubio, two additional players and a 2022 first-round draft pick. Oubre, Rubio, and several Thunder veterans from the 2019–20 season, such as Steven Adams, Dennis Schröder and Danilo Gallinari were traded away in the next several days as well, with Thunder receiving draft picks as part of compensation in most of those transactions. Overall, Thunder executed 14 separate trades after the end of the 2019–20 season and before the 2021 trade deadline.

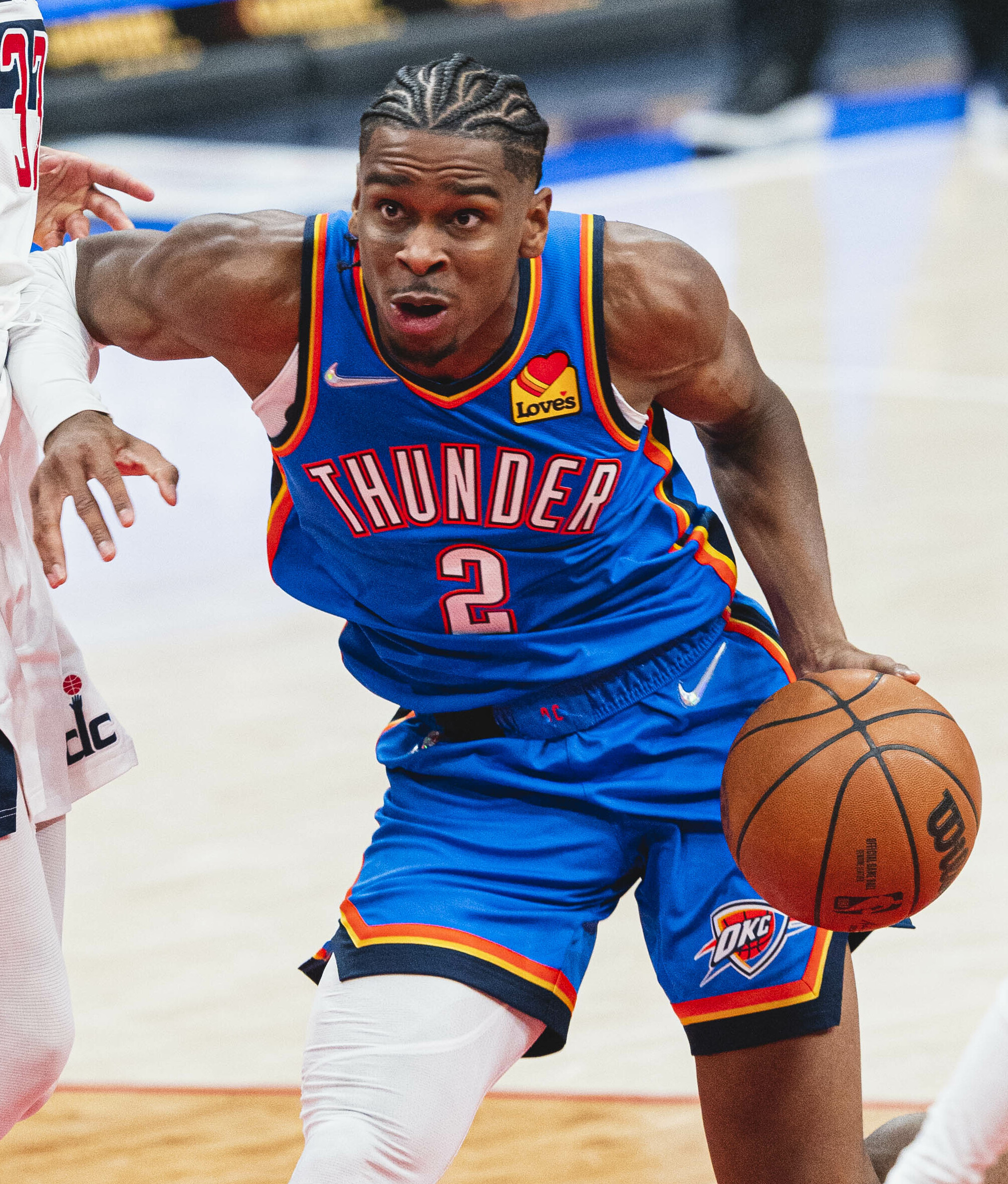
Shai Gilgeous-Alexander

5-time NBA All-Star Al Horford was one of the players acquired before the season. After one season, he was also traded for a 4-time All-Star Kemba Walker, with Thunder acquiring first-round draft picks as well in both transactions.

By the summer of 2021, Thunder accumulated 36 total draft picks over the next seven years, 18 in the first round and 18 in the second.

In the 2021 NBA draft, Thunder drafted Josh Giddey, Alperen Şengün and Tre Mann with their first-round picks. Şengün was then traded for two future draft picks.

On August 6, 2021, Shai-Gilgeous Alexander signed a 5-year maximum contract extension worth $172 million. On the same day, Thunder waived Kemba Walker after he agreed to a buy-out.

On December 2, 2021, the Thunder lost to the Memphis Grizzlies by an NBA record–setting 73 points, 79–152, which for the Thunder is the worst largest blowout loss ever in NBA history. Prior to the Thunder's record–setting 73–point blowout loss to the Grizzlies' in Memphis on December 2, just eight months earlier in the previous season, when the Thunder lost at home to the Indiana Pacers 152–95 on May 1, 2021, in Oklahoma City. For the Thunder's worst of history suffered their worst side on the most unwanted records in the NBA having their worst largest blowout home and road losses ever in NBA history.

On December 27, 2021, Josh Giddey became the second player in NBA history to record a double-double while also going scoreless (Norm Van Lier).

On January 2, 2022, Giddey became the youngest player in NBA history to record a triple-double at 19 years and 84 days, surpassing the record set by LaMelo Ball last season. Giddey also became the youngest player in NBA history to lead all players in points, rebounds, and assists in one game, becoming the second teenager to do so along with Luka Dončić.

On February 14, 2022, Giddey became the 7th rookie in NBA history to record back-to-back triple-doubles following a triple-double in Chicago the prior day. Giddey also became the third rookie to record a triple-double in his Madison Square Garden debut.

On February 16, 2022, Giddey, 19, joined Oscar Robertson as the only rookies in league history to record three consecutive triple-doubles.

On March 21, 2022, Tre Mann set a Thunder rookie record with 35 points on 13-20 shooting, 7 threes. Mann scored 23 of his 35 points on a perfect 6-6 shooting in a single quarter marking the new Thunder rookie record for points in a quarter.

On March 28, 2022, all five Thunder starters made two or more 3-pointers for the first time in OKC history.

On April 1, 2022, Jaylen Hoard became the sixth Thunder player to record a 20-rebound game.

On April 3, 2022, Aleksej Pokuševski became the 12th youngest player in NBA history to record a triple-double with 17 points, 10 rebounds, and 12 assists at 20 years and 98 days old.

On April 5, 2022, Hoard became the seventh player in OKC history to post a 20-point, 20-rebound game and the fifth to record multiple 20-rebound performances.

=== 2022–present: The duo of J-Dub and Chet Holmgren ===
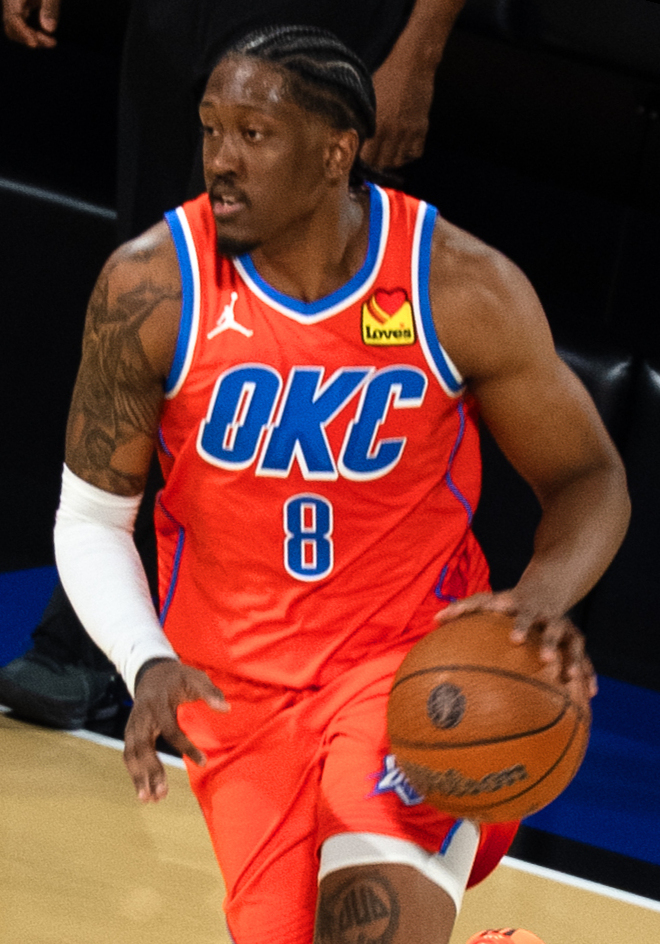
Jalen Williams

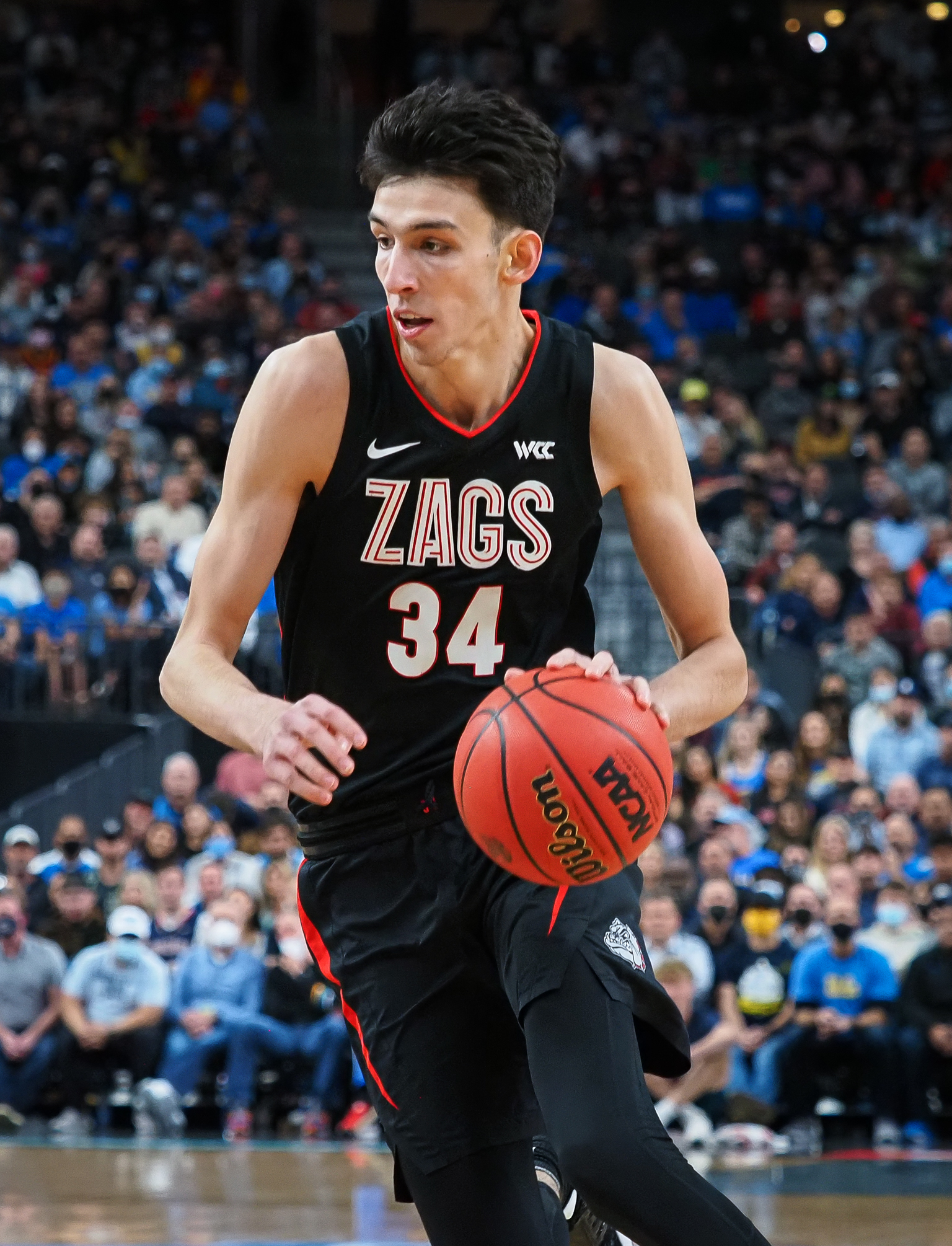
Chet Holmgren

At the 2022 NBA draft, the Thunder used their second overall pick to select Chet Holmgren and the twelfth pick to select Jalen Williams. On August 25, 2022, it was announced that Holmgren would miss the entire 2022–23 NBA season due to a Lisfranc injury in his foot that occurred during a Pro-am game. In the 2022–23 season, the Thunder finished regular season with the 10th-best record in the Western conference, qualifying for the play-in-tournament. After defeating the New Orleans Pelicans in their first play-in game, the Thunder lost to the Minnesota Timberwolves and did not qualify for the playoffs despite Shai Gilgeous-Alexander's leap to superstardom, averaging 31.1 points per game.

In the 2023–24 season, the Thunder acquired former All-Star Gordon Hayward. Chet Holmgren returned from injury and made an immediate impact as a rookie, Jalen Williams improved and Gilgeous-Alexander made his second All Star team and would later place second in MVP voting. On March 31, 2024, against the New York Knicks, the Thunder officially clinched a playoff berth with a 113–112 victory – their first playoff berth since the 2019–20 season. The Thunder finished with a record of 57 wins and 25 losses, clinching the top seed in the Western Conference for the first time since 2012–13. Mark Daigneault won the Coach Of The Year Award as the Thunder swept the New Orleans Pelicans in the first round becoming the youngest team to ever win a playoff series at an average age of 25 years old, but would lose to Luka Dončić's Dallas Mavericks in six games, even though they were up 17 points at one point in the series-deciding game 6.

==== 2024–present: Championship contender ====
Their first move in the off-season was trading starting guard Josh Giddey for the Chicago Bulls' guard Alex Caruso. Isaiah Hartenstein was also signed as a backup to Chet Holmgren who was now entering his sophomore year. The Thunder signed Nikola Topić, Dillon Jones and Ajay Mitchell to rookie contracts as the Thunder went into the 2024–25 season with high expectations.

After 10 games of good play, Holmgren went down with a rare hip injury and was announced to miss at least eight weeks leaving the Thunder short-handed with Hartenstein also being out. After missing the first 15 games of the season, Hartenstein returned on November 20, 2024.

Even without Holmgren, the Thunder beat the Houston Rockets to advance to the NBA Cup finals. They faced the Milwaukee Bucks, but lost the game 97–81. Despite this loss, the Thunder achieved their longest win streak in franchise history, setting a record at 15 consecutive wins. The streak ended when they lost to the Cleveland Cavaliers, who themselves were on a 10-game winning streak. It was the first time that a team on a 15-game winning streak had played a team on a 10-game winning streak in NBA history. Mark Daigneault was chosen as the head coach of one of the teams in the 2025 NBA All-Star Game. Gilgeous-Alexander was selected for his third straight All-Star Game and second start in a row and Jalen Williams made his first All-Star team as a reserve. On March 27, 2025, in a 125–104 win over the Memphis Grizzlies, the Thunder set a franchise record for total wins in a season at 61, beating the previous record of 60 wins set in the 2012–13 season on a 37-point outing from Gilgeous-Alexander and a double-double from Hartenstein. They finished the season with the top spot in the league with 68 wins. On May 8, the Thunder scored 87 points, breaking the record for most points in first half of an NBA playoff game. The previous record of 86 points was held by the Cleveland Cavaliers, set during the 2017 NBA Finals against the Golden State Warriors. In May 2025, Shai Gilgeous-Alexander was named NBA's most valuable player, becoming the third player in franchise history to receive the award, and was also named to All-NBA first team, while Jalen Williams made the All-NBA third team. The Thunder advanced to the NBA Finals and defeated the Indiana Pacers in seven games to win their first NBA championship since moving to Oklahoma City.

OKC continued to play with championship pedigree in the 2025–26 NBA season, with the Thunder holding the best record in the Western conference at the All star break with a 42-14 record. Sam Presti added another young scorer to the team when he acquired Jared McCain from the Philadelphia 76ers. On April 9, 2026, the Thunder secured the first seed in the Western Conference for the third year in a row following their win against the Los Angeles Clippers. The Oklahoma City Thunder continued onto the Western Conference Finals in the NBA Playoffs, but giving up a 4–3 lead against San Antonio Spurs in Game 7.

After losing to Spurs during the 2026 Western Conference Finals, the "Thunder Dynasty" of SGA era has collapse; two months later during the off-season Aaron Wiggins left the Thunder for the Atlanta Hawks as part of two future second-round picks and Luguentz Dort is reunited with Wiggins for the Hawks as part of the three teams trade.
