= Aliens (basketball) =

BIG3 basketball team

- Leagues: BIG3
- Founded: 2019
- Location: United States
- Team colors: Black, green and yellow
- Head coach: Rick Mahorn
- Website: big3.com/teams/aliens/

Aliens is an American men's 3-on-3 basketball team that plays in the BIG3. They were the second team announced in the 2019 BIG3 expansion and are led by former first overall pick in the 2018 BIG3 draft Andre Owens, who placed top seven in blocks and assists in 2018.

== 2019 ==
=== Draft ===
Round	Pick	Player	NBA experience	Last club
1	7	Greg Oden	7 years	(China) Jiangsu Dragons
2	18	Brandon Rush	9 years	(United States) Minnesota Timberwolves
3	23	Robert Vaden	0 years	(United States) Erie BayHawks

== 2021 ==
=== Draft ===
Round	Pick	Player	NBA experience	Last club
1	6	Renaldo Balkman	6 years	(Nicaragua) Real Estali
2	17	Andre Owens	3 years	(Austria) BC Zepter Vienna

== 2022 ==
=== Draft ===
Round	Pick	Player	NBA experience	Last club
1	2	Deshawn Stephens	0 years	(Bosnia and Herzegovina) KK Igokea
2	14	Adam Drexler	0 years	(United States) Huston Cougars

== Season-by-season record ==
Season	GP	W	L	Win %	PF	PA	Finish	Playoffs
2019	8	3	5	.375	366	360	10th	Did not qualify
2020	Season cancelled due to the COVID-19 pandemic							
2021	6	2	4	.333	266	289	10th	Did not qualify
2022	7	5	3	.625	368	368	4th	Semifinals
2023	6	1	5	.167	247	301	12th	Did not qualify

== Game log ==
Aliens Game Log
2019 Season

Game	Date	Team	Score	High Points	High Rebounds	High Assists	Location	Record
1	June 23	Triplets	40–50	Rush (13)	Rush (8)	Owens (4)	Bankers Life Fieldhouse	0–1
2	June 30	3 Headed Monsters	44–50	Rush (15)	Rush (6)	Owens (2)	Liacouras Center	0–2
3	July 6	Ball Hogs	51–39	Oden (18)	Rush (12)	Oden, Rush, Owens, Hollins, Vaden (1)	Legacy Arena	1–2
4	July 13	Enemies	39–50	Oden (11)	Rush (7)	Hollins, Owens (2)	Dunkin' Donuts Center	1–3
5	July 21	Ghost Ballers	51–35	Brown (18)	Brown (10)	Rush (4)	Chesapeake Energy Arena	2–3
6	July 27	Bivouac	47–50	Rush (23)	Oden (8)	Oden (3)	Vivint Smart Home Arena	2–4
7	August 3	3's Company	50–35	Oden (18)	Oden (9)	Rush, Owens (3)	Fiserv Forum	3–4
8	August 17	Tri-State	44–51	Rush, Owens (11)	Oden (9)	Owens (4)	American Airlines Center	3–5

2021 Season

Game	Date	Team	Score	High Points	High Rebounds	High Assists	Location	Record
1	July 10	Ghost Ballers	45–51	Balkman (14)	Balkman (14)	Owens (3)	Orleans Arena	0–1
2	July 18	Ball Hogs	42–51	Rush, Owens (16)	Rush (12)	Rush, Owens, Balkman, Brown (1)	Orleans Arena	0–2
3	July 24	Killer 3's	47–50	Rush (22)	Owens (8)	Rush (3)	Orleans Arena	0–3
4	July 31	Trilogy	32–50	Owens (12)	Oden (11)	Owens, Oden, Rush (1)	American Airlines Center	0–4
5	August 5	Enemies	50–42	Brown, Owens (14)	Maxiell (13)	Rush (3)	Fiserv Forum	1–4
6	August 7	Power	50–45	Owens (14)	Oden (8)	Owens (2)	Credit Union 1 Arena	2–4

Win Loss

== Current roster ==
Aliens roster
Players
Coaches

Pos.	No.	Nat.	Name	Ht.	Wt.	Age
F	32	(Puerto Rico)	Balkman, Renaldo	2.01 m (6 ft 7 in)	96 kg (212 lb)	41 – 14 July 1984
SG	12	(United States)	Brown, Shannon	1.93 m (6 ft 4 in)	95 kg (209 lb)	40 – 29 November 1985
		(Serbia)	Bulut, Dušan (C)	1.91 m (6 ft 3 in)	95 kg (209 lb)	40 – 23 October 1985
		(Latvia)	Lasmanis, Kārlis (CC)	2.00 m (6 ft 7 in)	87 kg (192 lb)	31 – 8 April 1994
F/C	54	(United States)	Maxiell, Jason	2.01 m (6 ft 7 in)	118 kg (260 lb)	43 – 18 February 1983
C	22	(United States)	Oden, Greg	2.13 m (7 ft 0 in)	124 kg (273 lb)	38 – 22 January 1988
SG	20	(United States)	Owens, Andre	1.93 m (6 ft 4 in)	91 kg (201 lb)	45 – 31 October 1980
G/F	4	(United States)	Rush, Brandon	1.98 m (6 ft 6 in)	100 kg (220 lb)	40 – 7 July 1985

Head coach

- Rick Mahorn

Legend

- (C) Team captain
- (CC) Team co-captain
- Injured

- Roster

== Head coaches ==
Years Active	Name	BIG3 Championships
2019	Tiny Archibald	0
2021-2024	Rick Mahorn	0
