= 2019 Big3 season =

2019 BIG3 season
- League: BIG3
- Sport: 3x3 basketball
- Duration: June 22, 2019–August 17, 2019; August 25, 2019 (playoffs); September 1, 2019 (championship)
- Number of games: 48 (regular season)
- Number of teams: 12
- TV partner(s): CBS and CBS Sports Network

Draft
- Top draft pick: Royce White
- Picked by: Enemies

Regular season
- Season champions: Triplets
- Runners-up: Killer 3's
- Season MVP: Joe Johnson

Playoffs
- Champions: Triplets
- Runners-up: Killer 3's

Seasons
- ← 2018 2021 →

The 2019 BIG3 season was the third season of BIG3. The regular season began on June 22, 2019 and ended on August 17, 2019. The playoffs began on August 25, 2019 and concluded with the championship game on September 1, 2019.

On January 11, 2019, the BIG3 announced that they would expand to 12 teams for the upcoming season, and move to two nights (consisting of three games each) per week. The league will also play in 18 cities, and allow players as young as 27 to compete in the league.

On April 4, 2019, BIG3 announced a new broadcast deal with CBS Sports, under which coverage moved to CBS and CBS Sports Network.

On April 18, 2019, BIG3 announced a new partnership deal with Toyota which introduces the RAV4 Point Shot. On April 29, 2019, BIG3 announced another partnership deal with cannabidiol brand cbdMD as the official jersey partner of the BIG3.

== Venues ==
Week	Date(s)	Venue	City	Notes
1	June 22, 2019	Little Caesars Arena	Detroit, Michigan	
1	June 23, 2019	Bankers Life Fieldhouse	Indianapolis, Indiana	
2	June 29, 2019	Spectrum Center	Charlotte, North Carolina	
2	June 30, 2019	Liacouras Center	Philadelphia, Pennsylvania	
3	July 6, 2019	Legacy Arena	Birmingham, Alabama	
3	July 7, 2019	State Farm Arena	Atlanta, Georgia	
4	July 13, 2019	Dunkin Donuts Center	Providence, Rhode Island	
4	July 14, 2019	Barclays Center	Brooklyn, New York	
5	July 20, 2019	Sprint Center	Kansas City, Missouri	
5	July 21, 2019	Chesapeake Energy Arena	Oklahoma City, Oklahoma	
6	July 27, 2019	Vivint Smart Home Arena	Salt Lake City, Utah	
7	August 3, 2019	Allstate Arena	Rosemont, Illinois	
7	August 4, 2019	Fiserv Forum	Milwaukee, Wisconsin	
8	August 10, 2019	American Airlines Arena	Miami, Florida	
9	August 17, 2019	American Airlines Center	Dallas, Texas	
10	August 25, 2019	Smoothie King Center	New Orleans, Louisiana	Playoffs
11	September 1, 2019	Staples Center	Los Angeles, California	Championship Game

== Draft ==
The 2019 BIG3 draft was held in Las Vegas, Nevada on April 12, 2019. 31 players were selected across three rounds.

=== Player selections ===
Round	Pick	Player	Team	NBA experience	Last team	Last played
1	1	Royce White	Enemies	1 year	(Canada) London Lightning	2018
1	2	Chris Johnson	Triplets	3 years	(Lebanon) Homenetmen Beirut B.C.	2019
1	3	Larry Sanders	3 Headed Monsters	6 years	(United States) Cleveland Cavaliers	2017
1	4	Josh Powell	Killer 3's	7 years	(South Korea) Changwon LG Sakers	2017
1	5	Will McDonald	Ball Hogs	None	(Japan) San-en NeoPhoenix	Active
1	6	Yakhouba Diawara	Tri-State	4 years	(France) ESSM Le Portel	2019
1	7	Greg Oden	Aliens	3 years	(China) Jiangsu Dragons	2016
1	8	Patrick O'Bryant	Trilogy	4 years	(Canada) London Lightning	2012
1	9	Shawne Williams	Bivouac	7 years	(The Bahamas) Al-Riffa	Active
1	10	Jamario Moon	Ghost Ballers	5 years	(United States) Albany Patroons	2018
2	11	C.J. Leslie	Bivouac	None	(United States) Texas Legends	Active
2	12	Donté Greene	Killer 3's	4 years	(Lebanon) Sporting Al Riyadi Beirut	2018
2	13	Tre Simmons	3 Headed Monsters	None	(Israel) Hapoel Afula B.C	2018
2	14	Jason Richardson	Tri-State	13 years	(United States) Philadelphia 76ers	2015
2	15	Alan Anderson	Triplets	8 years	(United States) Lakeland Magic	Active
2	16	Sam Young	Trilogy	4 years	(United Arab Emirates) Al-Nasr	Active
2	17	Alex Scales	Ghost Ballers	1 year	(India) Mumbai Challengers	2017
2	18	Brandon Rush	Aliens	9 years	(United States) Minnesota Timberwolves	2017
2	19	Jermaine Taylor	Ball Hogs	2 years	(United States) Salt Lake City Stars	Active
2	20	Craig Smith	Enemies	6 years	(Israel) Ironi Nes Ziona B.C.	2015
3	21	Teddy Gipson	Triplets	None	(Netherlands) Donar	2019
3	22	Mario Chalmers	3 Headed Monsters	9 years	(Italy) Virtus Bologna	2019
3	23	Robert Vaden	Aliens	None	(United States) Erie BayHawks	2017
3	24	Dušan Bulut	Ball Hogs	None	(United Arab Emirates) Novi Sad / Novi Sad Al-Wahda (3x3)	Active
3	25	C.J. Watson	Killer 3's	10 years	(Turkey) Uşak Sportif	Active
3	26	Dijon Thompson	3's Company	2 years	(Japan) Levanga Hokkaido	Active
3	27	Carlos Arroyo	Trilogy	9 years	(Puerto Rico) Leones de Ponce	2019
3	28	Dion Glover	Bivouac	6 years	(Venezuela) Gaiteros del Zulia	2008
3	29	Mike Taylor	Ghost Ballers	1 year	(China) Zhuhai Wolf Warriors	2019
3	30	Bonzi Wells	Tri-State	10 years	(Puerto Rico) Capitanes de Arecibo	2010
3	31	Frank Robinson	Enemies	None	(South Korea) Changwon LG Sakers	2018

NOTES * Last team does not only refer to NBA teams, it also refers to overseas play such as Euroleague, NBL or any other major international league * Last played refers to last year of being active in any basketball league

== Regular season ==
=== Week 1 (June 22 — Detroit, MI) ===
The first week of the first three games in the BIG3 Basketball League took place at the Little Caesars Arena, in Detroit, Michigan.

Game 1	3 Headed Monsters	51–46	Trilogy
Game 2	3's Company	38–50	Power
Game 3	Bivouac	50–43	Enemies

=== Week 1 (June 23 — Indianapolis, IN) ===
The first week of the second three games in the BIG3 Basketball League took place at the Bankers Life Fieldhouse, in Indianapolis, Indiana.

Game 4	Aliens	40–50	Triplets
Game 5	Killer 3's	54–52	Tri-State
Game 6	Ghost Ballers	50–39	Ball Hogs

=== Week 2 (June 29 — Charlotte, NC) ===
The second week of the first three games in the BIG3 Basketball League took place at the Spectrum Center (arena), in Charlotte, North Carolina.

Game 1	Triplets	51–41	Trilogy
Game 2	Ball Hogs	45–50	Enemies
Game 3	Killer 3's	50–32	3's Company

=== Week 2 (June 30 — Philadelphia, PA) ===
The second week of the second three games in the BIG3 Basketball League took place at the Liacouras Center, in Philadelphia, Pennsylvania.

Game 4	Bivouac	46–51	Ghost Ballers
Game 5	Aliens	44–50	3 Headed Monsters
Game 6	Tri-State	43–51	Power

=== Week 3 (July 6 — Birmingham, AL) ===
The third week of the first three games in the BIG3 Basketball League took place at the Legacy Arena, in Birmingham, Alabama.

Game 1	Tri-State	50–44	3's Company
Game 2	Ball Hogs	39–51	Aliens
Game 3	Ghost Ballers	35–51	Enemies

=== Week 3 (July 7 — Atlanta, GA) ===
The third week of the second three games in the BIG3 Basketball League took place at the State Farm Arena, in Atlanta, Georgia.

Game 4	Triplets	51–45	Bivouac
Game 5	3 Headed Monsters	48–51	Killer 3's
Game 6	Power	43–50	Trilogy

=== Week 4 (July 13 — Providence, RI) ===
The fourth week of the first three games in the BIG3 Basketball League took place at the Dunkin Donuts Center, in Providence, Rhode Island.

Game 1	Ghost Ballers	36–50	Power
Game 2	Aliens	39–50	Enemies
Game 3	3's Company	50–38	Ball Hogs

=== Week 4 (July 14 — Brooklyn, NY) ===
The fourth week of the second three games in the BIG3 Basketball League took place at the Barclays Center, in Brooklyn, New York.

Game 4	Triplets	50–37	Tri-State
Game 5	Bivouac	50–43	3 Headed Monsters
Game 6	Trilogy	50–48	Killer 3's

=== Week 5 (July 20 — Kansas City, MO) ===
The fifth week of the first three games in the BIG3 Basketball League took place at the Sprint Center, in Kansas City, Missouri.

Game 1	3's Company	50–34	Bivouac
Game 2	Triplets	47–50	Power
Game 3	Tri-State	50–46	3 Headed Monsters

=== Week 5 (July 21 — Oklahoma City, OK) ===
The fifth week of the second three games in the BIG3 Basketball League took place at the Chesapeake Energy Arena, in Oklahoma City, Oklahoma.

Game 4	Aliens	51–35	Ghost Ballers
Game 5	Trilogy	50–38	Enemies
Game 6	Ball Hogs	35–50	Killer 3's

=== Week 6 (July 27 — Salt Lake City, UT) ===
The sixth week of three games in the BIG3 Basketball League took place at the Vivint Smart Home Arena, in Salt Lake City, Utah.

Game 1	Killer 3's	41–51	3's Company
Game 2	Triplets	51–34	Ball Hogs
Game 3	Aliens	47–50	Bivouac

=== Week 7 (August 3 — Rosemont, IL) ===
The seventh week of the first three games in the BIG3 Basketball League took place at the Allstate Arena, in the Chicago suburb of Rosemont, Illinois.

Game 1	Tri-State	38–50	Ghost Ballers
Game 2	Power	50–41	Enemies
Game 3	Killer 3's	42–51	Bivouac

=== Week 7 (August 4 — Milwaukee, WI) ===
The seventh week of the second three games in the BIG3 Basketball League took place at the Fiserv Forum, in Milwaukee, Wisconsin.

Game 4	Aliens	50–35	3's Company
Game 5	3 Headed Monsters	48–50	Triplets
Game 6	Trilogy	51–43	Ball Hogs

=== Week 8 (August 10 — Miami, FL) ===
The eighth week of three games in the BIG3 Basketball League took place at American Airlines Arena in Miami, Florida.

Game 1	Enemies	32–50	3 Headed Monsters
Game 2	Tri-State	50–43	Power
Game 3	Ghost Ballers	50–47	Trilogy

=== Week 9 (August 17 — Dallas, TX) ===
The ninth week of all six games in the BIG3 Basketball League took place at American Airlines Center in Dallas, Texas.

Game 1	Bivouac	48–50	Ball Hogs
Game 2	Triplets	51–38	Ghost Ballers
Game 3	3 Headed Monsters	52–46	Power
Game 4	Killer 3's	50–36	Enemies
Game 5	3's Company	50–28	Trilogy
Game 6	Tri-State	51–44	Aliens

=== Standings ===
#	Team	W	L	Pct.	PF	PA	GP
1	YZ Triplets	7	1	.875	401.0	333.0	8
2	Y Killer 3's	5	3	.625	386.0	355.0	8
3	Y Power	5	3	.625	383.0	357.0	8
4	Y 3 Headed Monsters	4	4	.500	388.0	369.0	8
5	X 3's Company	4	4	.500	350.0	341.0	8
6	X Bivouac	4	4	.500	374.0	377.0	8
7	Trilogy	4	4	.500	363.0	374.0	8
8	Tri-State	4	4	.500	371.0	382.0	8
9	Ghost Ballers	4	4	.500	345.0	373.0	8
10	Aliens	3	5	.375	366.0	360.0	8
11	Enemies	3	5	.375	341.0	369.0	8
12	Ball Hogs	1	7	.125	323.0	401.0	8

Notes

- Z clinched top seed
- Y clinched playoff spot
- X qualified for fifth place game

== Playoffs ==
=== Week 10 (New Orleans, LA) ===
The semifinals and the fifth place game in the BIG3 Basketball League took place at the Smoothie King Center, in New Orleans, Louisiana.

Game 1 (5th Place)	3's Company	36–50	Bivouac
Game 2 (Semifinal)	Killer 3's	50–42	Power
Game 3 (Semifinal)	Triplets	50–39	3 Headed Monsters

=== Week 11 (Los Angeles, CA) ===
The third place game and the third BIG3 Championship game will take place at the Staples Center in Los Angeles, California.

Game 1 (3rd Place)	3 Headed Monsters	50–42	Power
Game 2 (Championship)	Triplets	50–39	Killer 3's

=== Bracket ===
Semifinals; Smoothie King Center, New Orleans, LA
1	Triplets	50
4	3 Headed Monsters	39
2	Killer 3's	50
3	Power	42

Championship; Staples Center, Los Angeles, CA
1	Triplets	50
2	Killer 3's	39
3rd Place
3	Power	42
4	3 Headed Monsters	50

== Individual statistic leaders ==
Category	Player	Team	Statistic
Points per game	Joe Johnson	Triplets	21.9
Rebounds per game	Reggie Evans	3 Headed Monsters	10.9
Assists per game	Joe Johnson	Triplets	3.9
Steals per game	David Hawkins	Trilogy	1.5
Blocks per game	Amar'e Stoudemire	Tri-State	1.8
FG%	Teddy Gipson	Triplets	.667
3FG%	C.J. Watson	Killer 3's	.692
4FG%	Shannon Brown; Teddy Gipson; Brandon Rush; Xavier Silas	Aliens; Triplets; Aliens; Ball Hogs	1.000

== Awards ==
The awards for the 2019 season will be announce prior to the championship game.

- Most Valuable Player: Joe Johnson (Triplets)
- Coach of the Year: Lisa Leslie (Triplets)
- Player Captain of the Year: Joe Johnson (Triplets)
- Defensive Player of the Year: Amar'e Stoudemire (Tri-State)
- 4th Man: Nate Robinson (Tri-State)
- Too Hard to Guard: Will Bynum (Bivouac)
- Best Trash Talker: Gary Payton (3 Headed Monsters)
- BIG Community Award: Ricky Davis (Ghost Ballers)
