= Ryan Hollins =

American basketball player (born 1984)

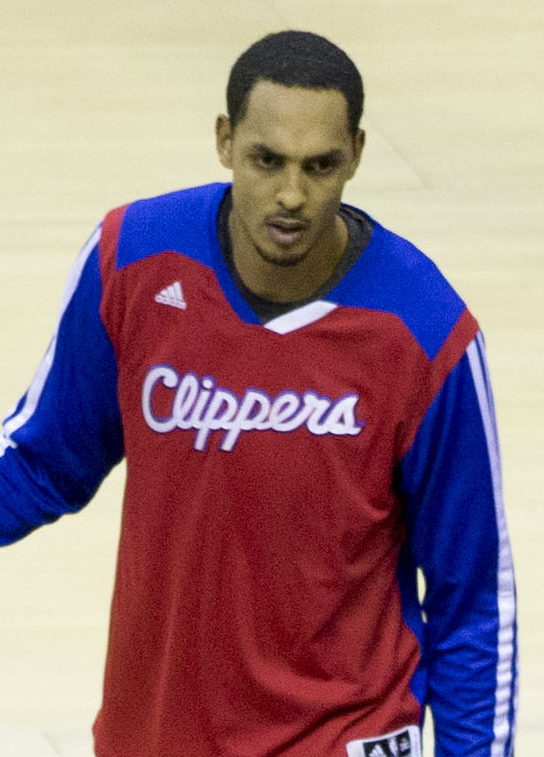
- Hollins with the Los Angeles Clippers in 2013

Personal information
- Born: October 10, 1984 (age 42) Pasadena, California, U.S.
- Listed height: 7 ft 0 in (2.13 m)
- Listed weight: 240 lb (109 kg)

Career information
- High school: John Muir (Pasadena, California)
- College: UCLA (2002–2006)
- NBA draft: 2006: 2nd round, 50th overall pick
- Drafted by: Charlotte Bobcats
- Playing career: 2006–2017
- Position: Center / power forward
- Number: 1, 15, 5, 50, 20

Career history
- 2006–2009: Charlotte Bobcats
- 2006: →Fort Worth Flyers
- 2009: Dallas Mavericks
- 2009–2010: Minnesota Timberwolves
- 2010–2012: Cleveland Cavaliers
- 2012: Boston Celtics
- 2012–2014: Los Angeles Clippers
- 2014–2015: Sacramento Kings
- 2015: Washington Wizards
- 2015–2016: Memphis Grizzlies
- 2016–2017: Herbalife Gran Canaria
- 2017: Auxilium Torino

Career NBA statistics
- Points: 1913 (3.7 ppg)
- Rebounds: 1140 (2.2 rpg)
- Assists: 151 (0.3 apg)
- Stats at NBA.com
- Stats at Basketball Reference
Medals
Men's basketball
Representing the United States
Pan American Games
Bronze medal – third place	2015 Toronto	National team

Ryan Kenwood Hollins (born October 10, 1984) is an American former professional basketball player who is a color commentator for the Houston Rockets of the National Basketball Association (NBA). He played college basketball for the UCLA Bruins. He was a 7-foot (2.1 m) center who was a journeyman in the NBA, playing for nine teams in 10 seasons. He played briefly in Europe before ending his career.

Following his playing career, he pursued work in broadcasting, working as a game analyst for CBS and as a studio analyst for Los Angeles Clippers games. He also worked as an analyst for ESPN and appeared on various programming for them, including SportsCenter and First Take, and has co-hosted "The Opinionated 7-Footers" podcast for the past year. He joined the Houston Rockets' broadcasting team on AT&T SportsNet as a color commentator.

== High school and college career ==
Hollins attended John Muir High School in Pasadena, California. He had signed with St. Louis University, but was allowed to withdraw his letter of intent after St. Louis head coach Lorenzo Romar left to become the head coach at the University of Washington. After declining St. Louis, Hollins committed to and enrolled at UCLA.

Hollins played significant minutes all four years of his career at UCLA. He had career averages of 5.5 points and 4 rebounds. He had a then career-high 11 points, 11 rebounds and seven blocks in a career-high 34 minutes against Oregon on January 30, 2003, and bettered his career high with 21 points in a loss to USC on January 28, 2004. He was named the Oakland Regional's Most Outstanding Player after registering 14 points and 9 rebounds in a 50–45 victory against the Memphis Tigers.

Hollins was also an accomplished high jumper, clearing 6'10" at the Pac-10 championships. In 2003, Hollins placed ninth in the high jump at the NCAA Regionals and sixth at the Pac-10 Championships.

== Professional career ==
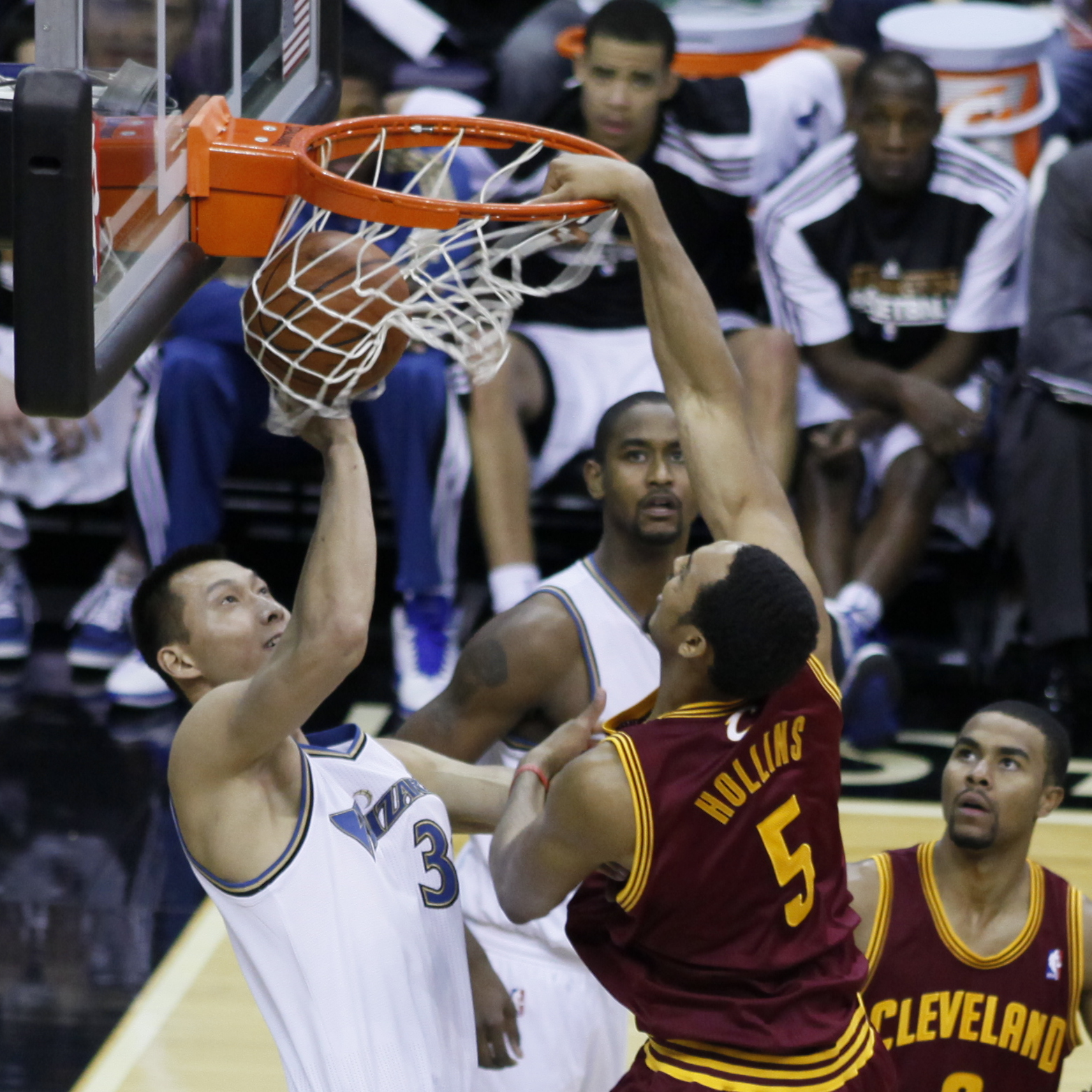
Hollins with Cleveland dunking against Yi Jianlian of the Washington Wizards.

=== NBA (2006–2016) ===
Hollins was drafted in the second round (50th pick overall) of the 2006 NBA draft by the Charlotte Bobcats. He was the 100th UCLA player to be selected in the NBA draft. He played in 27 games and averaged 2.6 points per game during his rookie season.

During 2008 off season, Bobcats extended him a qualifying offer and he became a restricted free agent. On July 25, 2008, he signed this qualifying offer to stay one more year with the Bobcats.

On January 16, 2009, Hollins was traded to the Dallas Mavericks along with Matt Carroll in exchange for DeSagana Diop.

On August 3, 2009, he was signed by the Minnesota Timberwolves to a three-year, $7 million offer sheet. The Mavericks did not match the offer.

On July 26, 2010, Hollins was traded to the Cleveland Cavaliers along with guard Ramon Sessions and a second round pick in 2013 in exchange for Delonte West and Sebastian Telfair.

He was released by the Cavaliers on March 20, 2012. He was then signed by the Boston Celtics on March 23, 2012. Signed primarily to add size to the Celtic bench, Hollins played sparingly through 15 regular season games. Hollins played in 17 of the 20 postseason games, providing quality energy and rebounding at times when rookie Greg Stiemsma was in foul trouble.

On July 23, 2012, Hollins signed with the Los Angeles Clippers. On July 10, 2013, he re-signed with the Clippers.

On September 18, 2014, Hollins signed with the Sacramento Kings.

On September 28, 2015, Hollins signed with the Memphis Grizzlies. However, he was later waived by the Grizzlies on October 26 after appearing in seven preseason games. On November 30, he signed with the Washington Wizards. On December 23, he was waived by the Wizards after appearing in five games. On December 29, he re-signed with the Grizzlies. On January 7, 2016, he was waived by the Grizzlies after appearing in four games. On January 21, he returned to the Grizzlies for a second time, signing a 10-day contract with the team. On February 1, he signed a second 10-day contract with the Grizzlies, and on March 2, he signed with the team for the rest of the season. On April 7, he was waived by the Grizzlies for a third time.

=== Herbalife Gran Canaria (2016–2017) ===
On December 5, 2016, Hollins signed with Herbalife Gran Canaria for the rest of the 2016–17 ACB season.

On March 15, 2017, he was released from Gran Canaria due to disciplinary reasons, for having traveled to the United States, without permission and with the negative expression of the club.

=== Auxilium Torino (2017) ===
Three days after being released from Herbalife Gran Canaria, Hollins signed with the Italian club Auxilium Torino for the rest of the 2016–17 LBA season.

=== Killer 3's (2018) ===
In April 2018, Ryan Hollins was selected by Killer 3's with the ninth overall pick of the 2018 BIG3 draft.

=== Aliens (2019) ===
In 2019, Hollins spent the BIG3 season playing for the Aliens.

=== 3's Company (2021) ===
In July 2021, Hollins joined 3's Company led by coach Michael Cooper.

=== Triplets (2022–present) ===
On May 25, 2022, Hollins was drafted by the Triplets with the sixth pick in the first round of the 2022 Big3 draft.

== NBA career statistics ==
Legend
GP	Games played	GS	Games started	MPG	Minutes per game
FG%	Field goal percentage	3P%	3-point field goal percentage	FT%	Free throw percentage
RPG	Rebounds per game	APG	Assists per game	SPG	Steals per game
BPG	Blocks per game	PPG	Points per game	**Bold**	Career high

=== Regular season ===
Year	Team	GP	GS	MPG	FG%	3P%	FT%	RPG	APG	SPG	BPG	PPG
2006–07	Charlotte	27	0	6.9	.556	—	.600	1.1	.0	.1	.3	2.4
2007–08	Charlotte	60	1	8.9	.489	—	.671	1.8	.2	.2	.5	2.5
2008–09	Charlotte	18	1	10.2	.543	—	.667	2.0	.2	.2	**.9**	3.6
2008–09	Dallas	27	2	9.6	.525	—	.515	2.3	.1	.1	.6	2.9
2009–10	Minnesota	**73**	**27**	16.8	.558	.000	.690	**2.8**	**.7**	**.3**	.5	**6.1**
2010–11	Cleveland	70	16	**16.9**	.598	—	.681	2.7	.4	**.3**	.6	5.3
2011–12	Cleveland	24	7	15.1	.500	—	.600	2.3	.3	.2	.5	3.7
2011–12	Boston	15	1	10.7	.643	—	.300	1.7	.2	.1	.3	2.8
2012–13	L.A. Clippers	60	0	11.1	.614	—	**.750**	2.3	.2	.1	.6	3.4
2013–14	L.A. Clippers	61	0	7.9	**.736**	—	.625	1.5	.1	.1	.5	2.3
2014–15	Sacramento	46	9	9.6	.646	—	.574	2.2	.3	.1	.4	3.0
2015–16	Washington	5	3	9.6	.571	—	.000	2.2	.0	.0	.2	1.6
2015–16	Memphis	32	9	12.9	.625	—	.619	2.7	.3	.2	.6	3.6
Career		518	76	11.8	.584	.000	.649	2.2	.3	.2	.5	3.7

=== Playoffs ===
Year	Team	GP	GS	MPG	FG%	3P%	FT%	RPG	APG	SPG	BPG	PPG
2009	Dallas	9	0	9.3	**.571**	.000	.600	**2.7**	.1	**.1**	.4	**2.4**
2012	Boston	**17**	0	**10.0**	.423	.000	.444	1.6	**.5**	.0	**.5**	1.5
2013	L.A. Clippers	5	0	7.4	.556	.000	.500	1.0	.4	.0	.4	2.2
2014	L.A. Clippers	5	0	1.8	.250	.000	**1.000**	.6	.0	.0	.0	.6
Career		36	0	8.3	.472	.000	.545	1.6	.3	.0	.4	1.7

== National team career ==
In July 2015, Hollins was a member of the bronze medal-winning United States national team at the 2015 Pan American Games.

== Personal life ==
Hollins is the son of Teryl and the late Denier Hollins.
