= Franklin Session =

American basketball player (born 1989)

Free Agent
- Position: Point guard / shooting guard

Personal information
- Born: January 23, 1989 (age 37) Los Angeles, California, U.S.
- Listed height: 6 ft 2 in (1.88 m)
- Listed weight: 175 lb (79 kg)

Career information
- High school: Jordan (Los Angeles, California)
- College: Irvine Valley College (2007–2008); Saddleback College (2008–2009); Weber State (2009–2010); Cal State Los Angeles (2010–2011)
- NBA draft: 2011: undrafted
- Playing career: 2011–present

Career history
- 2011: Los Angeles D-Fenders
- 2017: South Bay Lakers
- 2017–2018: Island Storm
- 2018–2019: Al-Gharafa
- 2019–2020: Jeoutai Basketball
- 2020–2021: Al-Gharafa

Career highlights
- Qatari Basketball League champion (2021); Qatar Crown Prince Cup champion (2021); Emir of Qatar Cup champion (2021); Qatar Player of the Year (2021); 2× Qatar Guard of the Year (2019, 2021); 2× All-Qatar First Team (2019, 2021); 2× Qatar All-Imports Team (2019, 2021); NBL Canada Newcomer of the Year (2018); Second-team All-NBLC (2018); Big Sky Newcomer of the Year (2010); Second-team All-Big Sky (2010); First-team All-CCAA (2011)

Franklin "Frank Nitty" Session (born January 23, 1989) is an American professional basketball player who last played for Al-Gharafa of the Qatari Basketball League. He is best known for his performance in the Drew League, where he won four consecutive league MVPs. He also plays, since the 2019 season, in the 3x3 basketball league Big3 for the team Killer 3's where he is a co-captain.

== Early life ==
Session grew up in the Watts neighborhood of Los Angeles and attended Jordan High School. Originally interested in skateboarding, he did not play basketball for Jordan until his junior year when the team's head coach, Van Myers, noticed his raw athleticism.

== Collegiate career ==
=== Irvine Valley College ===
In his freshman season Session averaged 1.5 points, 10.5 rebounds, and 3 assists while helping his team to a conference championship.

=== Saddleback College ===
After a year at Irvine Valley Session moved to Saddleback College for his sophomore season frl, where he played one year and was named All-California Community College first team and MVP of the Orange Empire Conference. In 3 games at the state tournament, he averaged 13.3 rebounds per contest.

=== Weber State ===
After one season at Saddleback, Session transferred to Weber State for his junior season. He started in the same backcourt as future NBA All Star Damian Lillard and averaged 10.2 points (3rd on the team), 6 rebounds, 2.9 assists, 1.9 steals during the season but averaged 11.9 points and 6.2 rebounds in 16 conference games and was named the Big Sky Conference Newcomer of the Year and second team All-Big Sky. Session was ultimately dismissed from the team after the end of the season. Led Weber State with 28 dunks.

=== Cal State, Los Angeles ===
Session played his senior season at Division II Cal State, Los Angeles, where he averaged 16.3 points, 7.6 rebounds, and a conference leading 2.6 steals per game and was named first team All-CCAA. Additionally, he helped lead the Golden Eagles to their first-ever CCAA Championship Tournament victory.

== Professional career ==
Session was initially selected in the 6th round of the 2011 NBA Development League draft by the Los Angeles D-Fenders, but was waived by the team due to injury after appearing in only two games. He then chose not to continue to pursue a professional basketball career and eventually became the manager of a Verizon Wireless store. Session began playing in adult leagues around Los Angeles before eventually competing in the Drew League, a pro-am summer exhibition league that many NBA players compete in, using his nickname "Frank Nitty". Session was named the MVP of the Drew League in both 2016 and 2017 while his team, Birdie's Revenge, won the Drew League championship on the later year. In 2018, Session gained significant attention for scoring 44 points on Chicago Bulls player Denzel Valentine and won his third straight MVP. In the 2019 Drew League he played for the team Public Enemy and was the Drew League Defensive Player of the Year.

=== South Bay Lakers ===
After his successful performance in the Drew League, Session was signed by the South Bay Lakers of the NBA G League. Session played with the team throughout the preseason but was among the team's final cuts.

=== Island Storm ===
Session signed with the Island Storm of the National Basketball League of Canada (NBLC) on November 9, 2017. He played in 43 games for the Storm, averaging a league-high 40 minutes and averaged 19.6 points, 9.8 rebounds, 5.7 assists, and 1.7 steals per game and was named the NBLC's Newcomer of the Year and second team All-NBLC.

=== Al Gharafa ===
Session signed with Al-Gharafa of the Qatari Basketball League on September 28, 2018. Session averaged 22.8 points, 10.9 rebounds, and 7.5 assists over the 17-game regular season as Al-Gharafa missed the playoffs with a 7–9 record. Following the end of the season, he was named the Guard of the Year, first team all-league, and all-import team by Asia-Basket.com.

=== Jeoutai Basketball ===
Session signed with Jeoutai Basketball of the Taiwanese Super Basketball League (SBL) for the 2019–20 season. He finished second in the league with 24.2 points per game and fourth with 11.0 rebounds, as well second with 6.3 assists while leading the SBL with 2.1 steals per game.

=== Al Gharafa (second stint) ===
Session signed a contract to return to Al-Gharafa on November 24, 2020.

== The BIG3 ==
Session entered the draft pool for the BIG3, a professional 3x3 basketball league. He was selected by and named co-captain of the Killer 3's.

Session was an all-around threat for Killer 3s in 2019, averaging 8.4 points, 5.9 rebounds and 3.6 assists per game. Only Joe Johnson of Triplets had more than Session's 29 assists. Session also hit a 3-pointer and a 4-pointer to help the Killer 3s win their regular season finale against the Enemies, clinching the No. 2 playoff seed.

He took over the captain role of the team in 2021 with the departure of Stephen Jackson. Killer 3s got off to a slow start, but were able to turn their season around on the backs of Nitty and Donté Greene. Session averaged 7.8 points per game with 25 assists on the season putting him third in that category. He also led the league in steals with 11 and gave the fans one of the highlights of the season with a monster dunk against Aliens in week three.

== The Basketball Tournament ==
Franklin Session played for Team CitiTeam Blazers in the 2018 edition of The Basketball Tournament. In one game, he had six points, five rebounds and two assists. CitiTeam Blazers made it to the Second Round before falling to Team Challenge ALS.

== Personal life ==
Session is married to his wife Nicole. They have one child together, a daughter named Milah. He also has a son named Jarrell from a previous relationship. In the Drew League, he was a teammate of the rapper The Game while playing on the team Birdie's Revenge from 2016 to 2018, winning a championship together in 2017.
