= TyShwan Edmondson =

American basketball player (born 1989)

Personal information
- Born: September 28, 1989 (age 36) South Bend, Indiana, U.S.
- Listed height: 6 ft 4 in (1.93 m)
- Listed weight: 174 lb (79 kg)

Career information
- High school: University Heights (Hopkinsville, Kentucky)
- College: St. John's (2008–2009); Midland (2009–2010); Austin Peay (2010–2012)
- NBA draft: 2012: undrafted
- Playing career: 2014–2015
- Position: Guard

Career history
- 2014–2015: Brampton A's

Career highlights
- NBL Canada Newcomer of the Year (2015); All-NBL Canada Second Team (2015); First-team All-OVC (2011); OVC All-Newcomer Team (2011)

TyShwan DeNane Edmondson (born September 28, 1989) is an American professional basketball player who last played for the Brampton A's of the National Basketball League of Canada (NBL). He was named NBL Canada Newcomer of the Year and earned All-NBLC honors in the 2014–15 season. At Austin Peay State University, he earned All-Ohio Valley Conference honors in 2011.

== High school career ==
As a senior in high school, Edmondson played prep basketball at University Heights Academy in Hopkinsville, Kentucky under head coach Randy McCoy. Edmondson averaged 18.4 points, 6.7 rebounds, 4.3 assists, and 2.7 steals per game, powering his team to a Kentucky High School Athletic Association (KHSAA) district and regional title. Among the guard's teammates was Scotty Hopson, who would go on to play college basketball at Tennessee. Edmondson also earned most valuable player honors at the Kentucky All "A" Tournament. UHA finished the season with a 30–5 record.

On April 30, 2008, Edmondson verbally committed to play for St. John's at the NCAA Division I level.
