= Drew League =

American pro–am basketball league

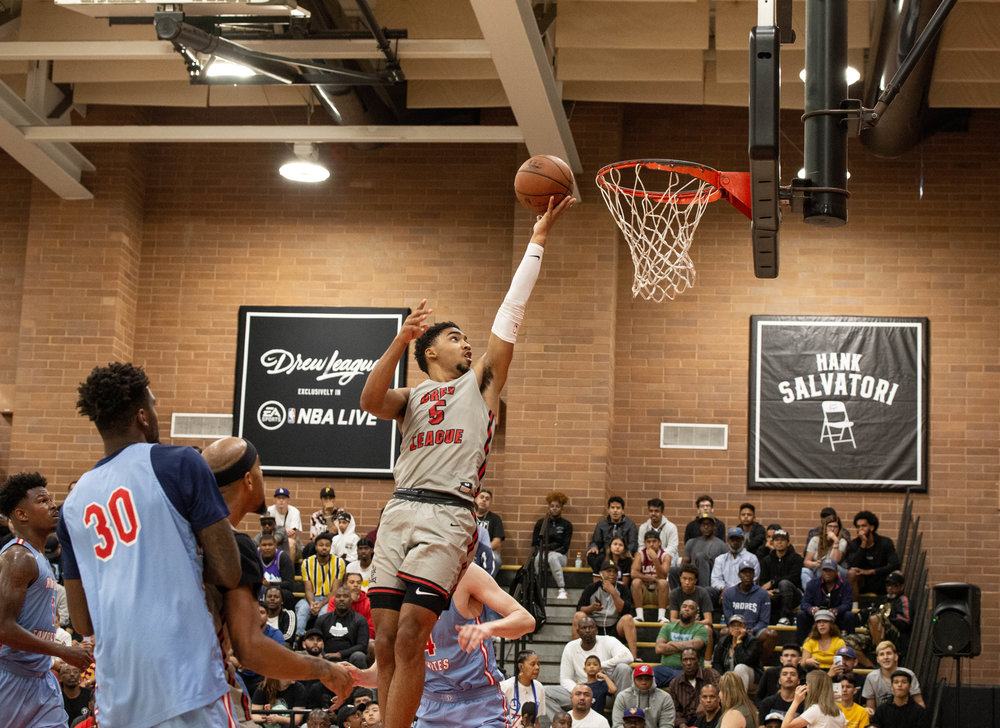
Kenyon Martin Jr. laying up the ball in a 2019 Drew League game.

The Drew League is a pro–am basketball league held every summer in Los Angeles, California. Established in 1973, the league has grown in popularity over the years, with NBA players regularly participating in its games.

== History ==
The Drew League was founded in 1973 by Alvin Wills, who worked at Charles R. Drew Middle School and initially counted 6 teams. The league rose in popularity over the 1980s, with an expanding number of teams (10 in 1985, 14 in 1988) and several high-profile high school, college, and professional players participating in the games. In 1987, Casper Ware Sr. scored 47 points in the Drew League championship game. In 1990 Easy Ed Reed established the all-time high for points scored in a single game with 64. During the 1992 Los Angeles riots, the Drew League organizers decided to keep the league open, offering support to the South Central Los Angeles community.

The league has occasionally attracted NBA players looking for a place to compete during the summer. During the 2011 NBA lockout, the Drew League saw an increase in popularity due to a higher number of NBA players participating. The attendance rose to 800 per game. Over the years, players from various countries such as China, France, Germany, Italy, Japan, and Spain participated in the Drew League. In 2012, to face the increased number of people attending, the Drew League moved from Leon H. Washington Park gym to King/Drew Magnet High School. In 2013, Nike started to sponsor the league. In 2016, the average attendance was 1,100. In 2017 the Drew League was featured in the basketball video game NBA Live 18. Since its foundation, more than 20,000 players have participated in the league. As of 2019, 24 teams compete in the Drew League, with the highest number of participating teams being 28 in the previous seasons.

The 2020 season was canceled due to the COVID-19 pandemic.

== Commissioners ==
- 1973–1984: Alvin Willis
- 1985–present: Oris "Dino" Smiley

== Venues ==
- 1973–2005: Charles R. Drew Middle School, Compton Avenue, Florence-Graham
- 2006–2011: Col. Leon H. Washington Park, Maie Avenue, Florence-Graham
- 2012–present: King/Drew Magnet High School, East 120th Street, Willowbrook

== Notable players ==
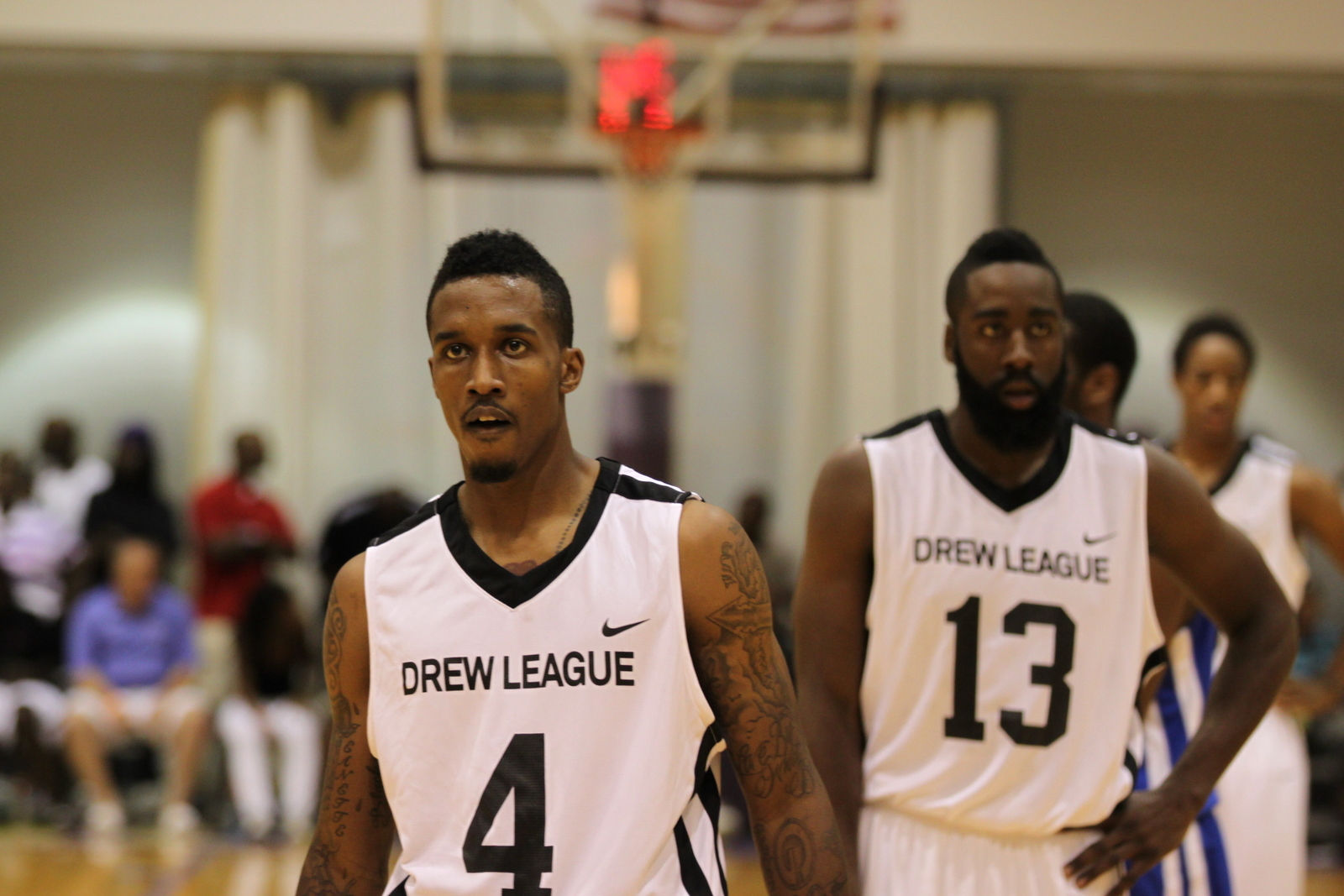
James Harden and Brandon Jennings, two of the NBA players who participated in the Drew League, during a 2011 game against a Goodman League team.

- Greg Anthony
- Trevor Ariza
- Marvin Bagley III
- Michael Beasley
- Steve Blake
- Bobby Brown
- LaMelo Ball
- LiAngelo Ball
- Jordan Bell
- Shannon Brown
- Kobe Bryant
- Jordan Clarkson
- John Collins
- Darren Collison
- Lester Conner
- Michael Cooper
- DeMarcus Cousins
- Baron Davis
- Glen Davis
- Austin Daye
- DeMar DeRozan
- Andre Drummond
- Kevin Durant
- Tari Eason
- Tyreke Evans
- David Fizdale
- Malachi Flynn
- The Game
- Rudy Gay
- Paul George
- Jonathan Gibson
- Taj Gibson
- Tim Hardaway Jr.
- James Harden
- Montrezl Harrell
- Jason Hart
- Solomon Hill
- Kyrie Irving
- LeBron James
- Brandon Jennings
- Pooh Jeter
- Stanley Johnson
- Wesley Johnson
- Kyle Kuzma
- Ty Lawson
- Matt Leinart
- Raymond Lewis
- Tyronn Lue
- Kenyon Martin Jr.
- JaVale McGee
- De'Anthony Melton
- Andre Miller
- Cuttino Mobley
- Evan Mobley
- Shareef O'Neal
- Onyeka Okongwu
- Chris Paul
- Paul Pierce
- Kevin Porter Jr.
- Taurean Prince
- Gabe Pruitt
- Julius Randle
- Nate Robinson
- Terrence Ross
- Metta Sandiford-Artest
- Byron Scott
- Franklin Session
- Iman Shumpert
- Pascal Siakam
- Craig Smith
- J. R. Smith
- Joe Smith
- Dane Suttle
- Isaiah Thomas
- Klay Thompson
- P. J. Tucker
- Denzel Valentine
- John Wall
- Casper Ware Jr.
- Casper Ware Sr.
- Earl Watson
- Derrick Williams
- John "Hot Plate" Williams
- Lou Williams
- Marcus Williams
- Delon Wright
- Dorell Wright
- Nick Young
- Trae Young
