= Chicago Triplets =

BIG3 basketball team

- Leagues: BIG3
- Founded: 11 January 2019; 7 years ago
- History: Triplets (2019-2024); Chicago Triplets (2025-present)
- Capacity: Allstate Arena
- Location: Rosemont, Illinois, United States
- Team colors: Red, light royal blue, white, navy blue
- Head coach: Julius Erving
- Championships: 1 (2019)
- Website: big3.com/teams/chicago-triplets/

The Chicago Triplets are an American men's 3-on-3 basketball team based in Chicago, Illinois that plays in the BIG3. They were the first team announced in the 2019 BIG3 expansion.

Originally without a home city for their first five seasons, the Triplets were announced to be based in Chicago when the league switched to a city-based model for the 2025 season.

At the end of the 2019 BIG3 season, the Triplets won the championship over Killer 3's.

== 2019 ==
=== Draft ===
Pick	Player	NBA experience	Last Club
2	Joe Johnson	18 years	(United States) Boston Celtics
15	Alan Anderson	8 years	(United States) Lakeland Magic
21	Teddy Gipson	0 years	(Netherlands) Donar

== Current roster ==
2025 Chicago Triplets roster
Players

Pos.	No.	Player	Height	Weight	DOB	From
PF/C	-	Montrezl Harrell (C)	6 ft 7 in (2.01 m)	240 lb (109 kg)	1994-01-26	Louisville
SG	-	Jason Richardson (CC)	6 ft 6 in (1.98 m)	225 lb (102 kg)	1981-01-20	Michigan State
G	-	Chris Allen	6 ft 3 in (1.91 m)	190 lb (86 kg)	1988-01-13	Iowa State
C/G	-	Nasir Core	6 ft 3 in (1.91 m)	215 lb (98 kg)	1997-11-20	Florida A&M
PF/C	-	Amir Johnson	6 ft 9 in (2.06 m)	253 lb (115 kg)	1987-05-01	Westchester High School (Los Angeles)

Coaches
Head coach
- Julius Erving

Legend
- (DP) Unsigned draft pick
- (FA) Free agent
- (S) Suspended
- (CC) Team co-captain
- Injured

Roster
Updated: 2025-06-30

== Head coaches ==
Years Active	Name	BIG3 Championships
2019-2024	Lisa Leslie	1
2025-present	Julius Erving	
