= Rick Mahorn =

American basketball player (born 1958)

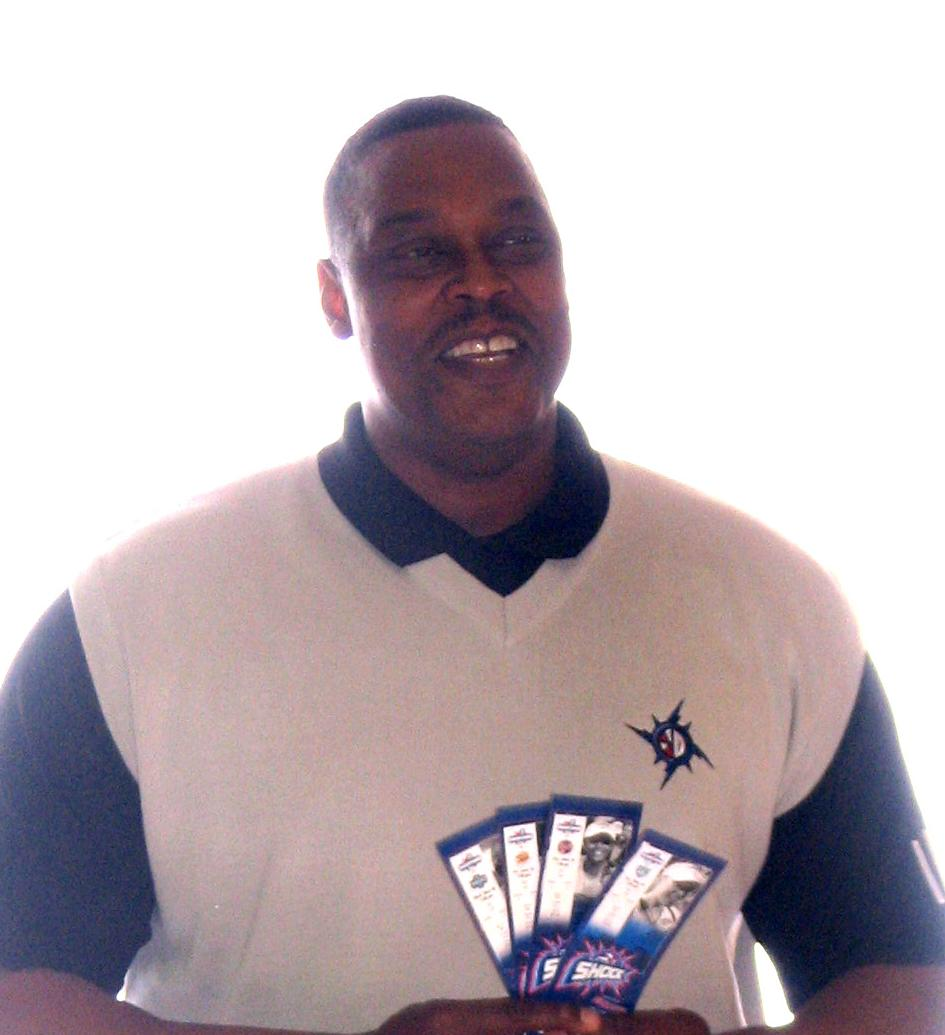
- Mahorn in 2007

Personal information
- Born: September 21, 1958 (age 68) Hartford, Connecticut, U.S.
- Listed height: 6 ft 10 in (2.08 m)
- Listed weight: 260 lb (118 kg)

Career information
- High school: Weaver (Hartford, Connecticut)
- College: Hampton (1976–1980)
- NBA draft: 1980: 2nd round, 35th overall pick
- Drafted by: Washington Bullets
- Playing career: 1980–1999
- Position: Power forward / center
- Number: 44, 4
- Coaching career: 1999–2009

Career history

Playing
- 1980–1985: Washington Bullets
- 1985–1989: Detroit Pistons
- 1989–1991: Philadelphia 76ers
- 1991–1992: Virtus Roma
- 1992–1996: New Jersey Nets
- 1996–1998: Detroit Pistons
- 1999: Philadelphia 76ers

Career highlights
- As player: NBA champion (1989); FIBA Korać Cup champion (1992); NBA All-Defensive Second Team (1990); CIAA Player of the Year (1979); 3× NAIA All-American (1977–1980); 3× First-team All-CIAA (1977–1980); As assistant coach: 2× WNBA champion (2006, 2008); As head coach: BIG3 champion (2017)

Career statistics
- Points: 7,763 (6.9 ppg)
- Rebounds: 6,957 (6.2 rpg)
- Blocks: 1,007 (0.9 bpg)
- Stats at NBA.com
- Stats at Basketball Reference

Derrick Allen Mahorn (born September 21, 1958) is an American former professional basketball player who played power forward and center for the Washington Bullets, Detroit Pistons, Philadelphia 76ers, and the New Jersey Nets of the National Basketball Association (NBA). He is currently a radio analyst for the Detroit Pistons, works as a co-host/analyst on SiriusXM NBA Radio, and during the summer is the head coach of the Detroit Amps of the BIG3.

Mahorn had a reputation for physical play, and was a member of the late 1980s Detroit Pistons teams known as "The Bad Boys", and with them won the 1989 NBA Championship. After his playing career, Mahorn would go on to be an assistant coach under Pistons teammate and head coach Bill Laimbeer with the Detroit Shock of the Women's National Basketball Association (WNBA) and was part of two WNBA Championship teams (2006, 2008). He would eventually become head coach of the Shock, and later became head coach of Trilogy of the BIG3, leading the team to the inaugural BIG3 Championship in 2017, making Mahorn the only one in history to have won a championship in the NBA, WNBA, and BIG3.

== College career ==
Mahorn played college basketball at Hampton University. He was a three-time NAIA All-American and owned 18 school records. He scored 2,418 points while playing for the Hampton Pirates, averaging 20.3 points per game.

== Playing career ==
Mahorn was drafted by the Washington Bullets in the second round of the 1980 NBA draft. While on the Bullets, Mahorn and all-star teammate Jeff Ruland were dubbed the "Beef Brothers" for their physicality and tough play when paired together on the court.

Mahorn's career is perhaps best known for the period after he was traded by the Bullets to the Detroit Pistons. He was unhappy with the trade initially and, as he claimed in a 2014 ESPN documentary, showed up to training camp overweight and out of shape. After teammate Bill Laimbeer took him aside and spoke with him about what he was brought there for, Mahorn acquiesced and became an integral part of the Pistons’ core. In 1989, Mahorn - dubbed by Piston announcer George Blaha the "Baddest Bad Boy of them all" - won his only NBA championship with the Pistons.

Two days after the Pistons won the championship in 1989, the NBA held an expansion draft for its two newest franchises, the Orlando Magic and Minnesota Timberwolves. League rules dictated that only eight players on each roster could be protected from being drafted by either team, and the Pistons elected not to extend that protection to Mahorn. As such, he was made the second pick in the expansion draft and the first to be taken by the Timberwolves; the Pistons were conducting their victory celebration in Detroit while the draft was happening and Mahorn was taken aside during the festivities, so he could be told. Pistons general manager Jack McCloskey tried to reacquire Mahorn to no avail, and years later Mahorn was shown to still be bothered by what transpired as the story of the expansion draft brought him to tears during the 2014 ESPN film about the team.

Mahorn, as it turned out, would never play for Minnesota. After refusing to report to the Timberwolves, he ended up being traded instead to the Philadelphia 76ers, where he teamed with superstar Charles Barkley (despite previous rivalries with him) to form the top-rebounding duo of "Thump N' Bump". After two seasons, Mahorn signed a two-year contract with Il Messaggero Roma of the Italian Serie A in 1991. Teaming up with Dino Radja, Mahorn helped Roma win the 1992 FIBA Korać Cup. He started the 1992–1993 season with Roma but was kicked off the team in October after throwing a chair in a heated argument with head coach Paolo Di Fonzo. In November, he returned to the NBA and signed with the New Jersey Nets. He played with the Nets for four seasons, before returning to the Pistons in 1996–97 under coach Doug Collins. He retired after the 1999 season, after a second stint with the 76ers.

== Coaching ==
=== WNBA ===
Mahorn then served as a color commentator for Pistons radio broadcasts, and as an assistant coach under former teammate Bill Laimbeer with the WNBA's Detroit Shock. Laimbeer and Mahorn led the Shock to two WNBA titles (2006, 2008).

On July 22, 2008, at a Sparks-Shock game, Mahorn attempted to break up a brawl. When attempting to restrain Lisa Leslie, he put his left hand out and Leslie fell to the ground. Mahorn was suspended for two games.

On June 15, 2009, he became the head coach of the Shock, a position he held until the franchise moved to Tulsa, Oklahoma after the season. Shortly afterward, Mahorn continued his work with Pistons radio, doing color commentary alongside Mark Champion.

=== BIG3 ===
In 2017, Mahorn became head coach of Trilogy, the eventual champion of the BIG3 basketball league's inaugural season. His team's players included Al Harrington and Kenyon Martin.

== NBA career statistics ==
Legend
GP	Games played	GS	Games started	MPG	Minutes per game
FG%	Field goal percentage	3P%	3-point field goal percentage	FT%	Free throw percentage
RPG	Rebounds per game	APG	Assists per game	SPG	Steals per game
BPG	Blocks per game	PPG	Points per game	**Bold**	Career high
†	Won an NBA championship

=== Regular season ===
Year	Team	GP	GS	MPG	FG%	3P%	FT%	RPG	APG	SPG	BPG	PPG
1980–81	Washington	52	0	13.4	.507	.000	.675	4.1	0.5	0.4	.8	4.8
1981–82	Washington	80	80	33.3	.507	.000	.632	8.8	**1.9**	0.7	1.7	**12.2**
1982–83	Washington	**82**	**82**	**36.9**	.490	.000	.575	**9.5**	1.4	**1.0**	**1.8**	11.0
1983–84	Washington	**82**	**82**	32.9	.507	.000	.651	9.0	1.6	0.8	1.5	9.0
1984–85	Washington	77	63	26.9	.499	.000	.653	7.9	1.6	0.8	1.4	6.3
1985–86	Detroit	80	12	18.0	.455	.000	.681	5.2	0.8	0.5	.8	4.9
1986–87	Detroit	63	6	20.3	.477	.000	**.821**	6.0	0.6	0.5	.8	6.1
1987–88	Detroit	67	64	29.3	**.574**	**.500**	.756	8.4	0.9	0.6	.6	10.7
1988–89†	Detroit	72	61	24.9	.517	.000	.748	6.9	0.8	0.6	.9	7.3
1989–90	Philadelphia	75	66	30.3	.497	.222	.715	7.6	1.3	0.6	1.4	10.8
1990–91	Philadelphia	80	74	30.5	.467	.000	.788	7.8	1.5	**1.0**	.7	8.9
1992–93	New Jersey	74	9	14.6	.472	.333	.800	3.8	0.4	0.3	.4	3.9
1993–94	New Jersey	28	0	8.1	.489	.000	.650	1.9	0.2	0.1	.2	2.1
1994–95	New Jersey	58	7	10.9	.523	.333	.796	2.8	0.4	0.2	.2	3.4
1995–96	New Jersey	50	0	9.0	.352	.000	.723	2.2	0.3	0.3	.3	2.4
1996–97	Detroit	22	7	9.9	.370	.000	.727	2.4	0.3	0.2	.1	2.5
1997–98	Detroit	59	0	12.0	.457	.000	.676	3.3	0.3	0.2	.1	2.4
1998–99	Philadelphia	16	0	7.9	.278	.000	.375	1.4	0.1	0.3	.1	0.8
Career		1117	613	23.1	.493	.132	.704	6.2	1.0	0.6	.9	6.9

=== Playoffs ===
Year	Team	GP	GS	MPG	FG%	3P%	FT%	RPG	APG	SPG	BPG	PPG
1982	Washington	7	7	34.6	.438	.000	.714	8.7	**1.9**	**1.4**	.7	**10.6**
1984	Washington	4	4	**38.5**	**.600**	.000	.800	**10.8**	1.5	0.3	**1.5**	9.5
1985	Washington	4	1	10.3	.500	.000	**1.000**	1.8	0.0	0.0	.8	3.0
1986	Detroit	4	0	15.3	.385	.000	**1.000**	3.0	0.0	0.3	.0	3.0
1987	Detroit	15	15	32.2	.541	.000	.800	9.5	0.3	0.4	.7	9.7
1988	Detroit	**23**	**21**	17.8	.344	.000	.684	3.9	0.6	0.2	.4	3.3
1989†	Detroit	17	17	21.2	.580	.000	.654	5.1	0.4	0.5	.8	5.7
1990	Philadelphia	10	10	34.2	.430	.000	.769	7.0	1.0	0.7	.8	9.4
1991	Philadelphia	8	8	26.0	.556	.000	.786	5.3	1.8	0.3	.5	6.4
1993	New Jersey	4	2	15.8	.400	.000	.000	3.3	0.8	0.0	.5	2.0
1994	New Jersey	3	0	6.3	.000	.000	.000	1.3	0.0	0.0	.3	0.0
1997	Detroit	2	1	9.0	.000	.000	.000	0.5	0.0	0.0	.0	0.0
1999	Philadelphia	5	0	5.8	.333	.000	.500	1.6	0.2	0.2	.0	1.6
Career		106	86	22.9	.427	.000	.750	5.5	0.7	0.4	.6	5.8

== Head coaching record ==
Team	Year	G	W	L	W–L%	Finish	PG	PW	PL	PW–L%	Result
Detroit	2009	31	17	14	.548	3rd in Eastern	5	3	2	.600	Lost Conference finals
Career		31	17	14	.548		5	3	2	.600	

== Personal life ==
Mahorn played himself in a 2017 episode of Detroiters titled "Quick Rick Mahorn in Dearborn." In the episode, he states that his parents died in an alley; however, that was just part of the script.

== Awards and honors ==
- 1989 NBA Champion (as a player with the Detroit Pistons)
- Two-time WNBA Champion (2006, 2008 - as an assistant coach with the Detroit Shock)
- 2017 BIG3 Champion (as head coach of Trilogy)
- Virginia Sports Hall of Fame (class of 2018)

== See also ==
- List of NBA career personal fouls leaders
