= NBL Canada Newcomer of the Year Award =

The National Basketball League of Canada's Newcomer of the Year Award is an annual National Basketball League of Canada (NBL) award given since the 2012–13 season. It is earned by the best player who completed his first season in the league. It was first awarded to the London Lightning's Marvin Phillips, who went on to be named Finals Most Valuable Player in 2013. The most recent recipient is Jarius "JR" Holder of the Sudbury Five.

== Winners ==
Season	Player	Position	Nationality	Team
2012–13	Marvin Phillips	Forward	United States	London Lightning
2013–14	Justin Tubbs	Guard	United States	Ottawa SkyHawks
2014–15	TyShwan Edmondson	Guard	United States	Brampton A's
2015–16	James Justice	Guard	United States	Moncton Miracles
2016–17	Jahii Carson	Guard	United States	Island Storm
2017–18	Franklin Session	Guard	United States	Island Storm
2018–19	Jaylen Bland	Guard	United States	Sudbury Five
2019–20	J. R. Holder	Forward	United States	Sudbury Five
2020-21	Not awarded — Season cancelled due to COVID-19 pandemic.			
2022	Jeremy Harris	Guard	United States	Sudbury Five
