= Lisa Leslie =

American basketball player (born 1972)

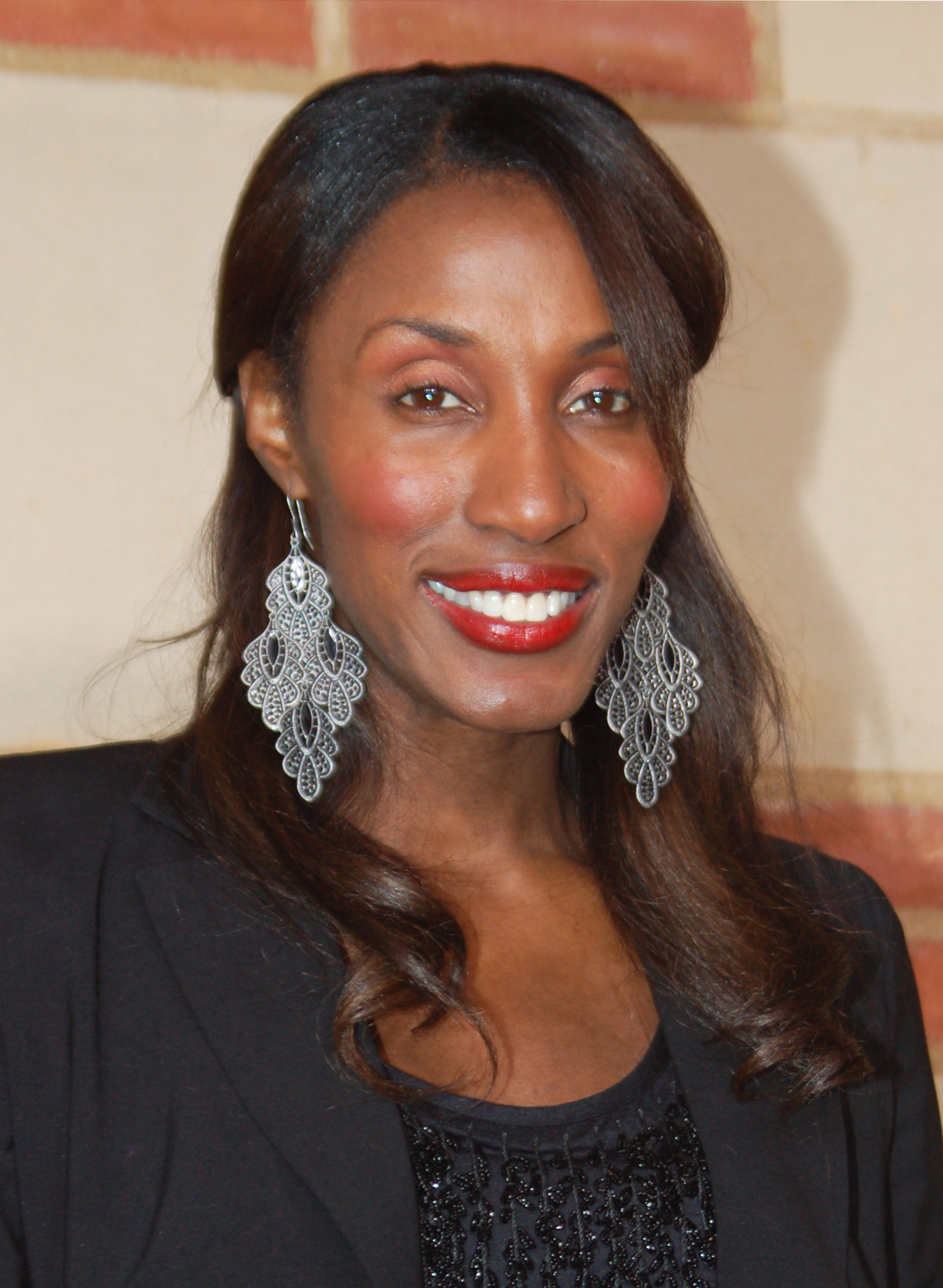
- Leslie in 2010

Personal information
- Born: July 7, 1972 (age 54) Compton, California, U.S.
- Listed height: 6 ft 5 in (1.96 m)
- Listed weight: 170 lb (77 kg)

Career information
- High school: Morningside (Inglewood, California)
- College: USC (1990–1994)
- WNBA draft: 1997: Allocated
- Drafted by: Los Angeles Sparks
- Playing career: 1997–2009
- Position: Center
- Number: 9

Career history

Playing
- 1997–2006, 2008–2009: Los Angeles Sparks

Career highlights
- As player: 2× WNBA champion (2001, 2002); 2× WNBA Finals MVP (2001, 2002); 3× WNBA MVP (2001, 2004, 2006); 8× WNBA All-Star (1999–2003, 2005, 2006, 2009); 3× WNBA All-Star Game MVP (1999, 2001, 2002); 8× All-WNBA First Team (1997, 2000–2004, 2006, 2008); 4× All-WNBA Second Team (1998, 1999, 2005, 2009); 2× WNBA Defensive Player of the Year (2004, 2008); 2× WNBA All-Defensive First Team (2006, 2008); 2× WNBA All-Defensive Second Team (2005, 2009); 2× WNBA blocks leader (2004, 2008); 3× WNBA rebounding champion (1997, 1998), 2004); WNBA Peak Performer (2004); WNBA anniversary teams (10th, 15th, 20th, 25th); No. 9 retired by Los Angeles Sparks; Honda Sports Award (1994); Naismith College Player of the Year (1994); USBWA National Player of the Year (1994); WBCA Player of the Year (1994); Kodak All-American (1994); 2× All-American – USBWA (1993, 1994); 4× All Pac-10 (1991-1994); No. 33 retired by USC; Naismith Prep Player of the Year (1990); Gatorade National Player of the Year (1990); 3× USA Basketball Female Athlete of the Year (1993, 1998, 2002); FIBA World Championship MVP (2002); As head coach: BIG3 champion (2019)

Career WNBA statistics
- Points: 6,263 (17.3 ppg)
- Rebounds: 3,307 (9.1 rpg)
- Blocks: 822 (2.3 bpg)
- Stats at WNBA.com
- Stats at Basketball Reference
- Basketball Hall of Fame
- Women's Basketball Hall of Fame
- FIBA Hall of Fame
Medals
Representing United States
Olympic Games
Gold medal – first place	1996 Atlanta	National Team
Gold medal – first place	2000 Sydney	National Team
Gold medal – first place	2004 Athens	National Team
Gold medal – first place	2008 Beijing	National Team
World Championships
Gold medal – first place	1998 Germany	National Team
Gold medal – first place	2002 China	National Team
Bronze medal – third place	1994 Australia	National Team
World University Games
Gold medal – first place	1991 Sheffield	Team competition
Jones Cup
Gold medal – first place	1992 Taipei	Team competition

Lisa Deshaun Leslie (born July 7, 1972) is an American former professional basketball player. She is formerly the head coach for Triplets in the BIG3 professional basketball league, as well as a studio analyst for Orlando Magic broadcasts on FanDuel Sports Network Florida. In 2002, Leslie made history as the first player to dunk during a Women's National Basketball Association (WNBA) game. Leslie was ranked 5th on ESPN.com's 2021 list of the WNBA's greatest players of all time.

Leslie played in the WNBA for the Los Angeles Sparks from 1997 to 2009. She is a three-time WNBA MVP and a four-time Olympic gold medal winner. The number-seven pick in the 1997 inaugural WNBA draft, she followed her career at the University of Southern California with eight WNBA All-Star selections and two WNBA championships over the course of 11 seasons with the Los Angeles Sparks, before retiring in 2009. In 2011, she was voted in by fans as one of the Top 15 players in WNBA history. All throughout her WNBA career, Leslie also played for USA Basketball in international competition, winning four Olympic gold medals (1996, 2000, 2004, 2008) and two FIBA World Championships (1998, 2002).

In 2015, Leslie was inducted into the Women's Basketball Hall of Fame. She has been inducted into the Naismith Basketball Hall of Fame twice: in 2015 for her individual career, and in 2026 as a member of the 1996 United States women's Olympic basketball team.

Upon becoming coach of the Triplets in 2019, she led the team to the BIG3 Championship that year.

In 2022, Leslie got inducted into the FIBA Hall of Fame.

== Early life ==
Leslie was born in Compton, California, the daughter of Christine Lauren Leslie, who stood 6 feet 3 inches (1.91 m), and Walter Leslie, a former professional basketball player. Christine started her own truck driving business to support her three children. Walter left the family when her mother was four months pregnant with her. Leslie has two sisters: Dionne, who is five years older, and Tiffany, who is eight years younger. She also has a brother, Elgin (named after Elgin Baylor of the Los Angeles Lakers). She is African American. She played on an all-girls team with the record 33–1.

=== Middle school ===
During the first few weeks of middle school, a classmate asked Leslie to help out the basketball team. On her first day of basketball tryouts, team members were told to split into two groups for layup drills: lefties and righties. Leslie was the only lefty in the group, so from then on, she decided to become right-hand dominant so she would not have to stand in a line by herself. That decision worked to her advantage, as she became ambidextrous.

In eighth grade, she transferred to a junior high school without a girls' basketball team, and joined a boys' basketball team. Her success there contributed to her confidence in her playing abilities.

=== High school ===
At the age of 14, before Leslie had started high school at Morningside, she received more than a hundred college recruiting letters, including some from top Division I programs at the University of Tennessee and Stanford University.

Leslie continued her education in 1986 by enrolling at Morningside High School in Inglewood, California. She made an immediate impact on the basketball program, starting every game for the girl's varsity team. She also joined the volleyball team and competed in track and field. She ended up being a state qualifier in the 400-meter run and the high jump.

By the time she was a sophomore in high school, she was able to dunk the ball in the open court, even though she was not able to palm the ball. She was her team's leading scorer and rebounder and led them to the 1989 California state championship. Leslie was invited to participate in the USA's Junior World Championship team. Entering her senior year, she developed into the top player in the country. She led her team to a state championship averaging 27 points and 15 rebounds per game. She tied the national record for points scored by a high school basketball player with Cheryl Miller in 1990 with 101 points scored, all in the first half. She had scored 105 points but four of the points were due to a technical foul charged on the opposing team for a delay of game after halftime, which were later voided as the game was deemed to end after the first half when the opposing team from South Torrance refused to play.

== College career ==
Leslie attended the University of Southern California from 1990 to 1994. She graduated from USC with a bachelor's degree in communications and later completed her master's degree in business administration from the University of Phoenix.

Leslie played in a total of 120 college games, averaging 20.1 points, hitting 53.4% of her shots, and knocking down 69.8% of her free throws. She set the Pac-10 Conference records for scoring, rebounding, and blocked shots accumulating 2,414 points, 1,214 rebounds, and 321 blocked shots. She also held the USC single season record for blocked shots (95), until being surpassed by Rayah Marshall (98) in 2023.

During her college career, USC compiled a 89–31 record. They won one Pac-10 conference championship and earned four NCAA tournament appearances. Leslie was honored with All-Pac-10 recognition all four years, as well as becoming the first player in Pac-10 history to obtain first team all four years and earn the Pac-10 Rookie of the Year award in 1991. Leslie was also honored on the national platform by earning the national freshman of the year award in 1991. In 1994, she won multiple national player of the year awards—the Naismith College Player of the Year award, the USBWA Women's National Player of the Year award, the Honda Sports Award for basketball, and the WBCA Player of the Year award. In 1992, 1993, and 1994, she earned All-American Honors as well.

=== USC statistics ===
Legend
GP	Games played	GS	Games started	MPG	Minutes per game
FG%	Field goal percentage	3P%	3-point field goal percentage	FT%	Free throw percentage
RPG	Rebounds per game	APG	Assists per game	SPG	Steals per game
BPG	Blocks per game	PPG	Points per game	**Bold**	Career high

College basketball statistics
Year	Team	GP	Points	FG%	3P%	FT%	RPG	APG	SPG	BPG	PPG
1990–91	USC	30	582	47.8%	**25.0%**	67.6%	10.0	0.7	1.4	2.6	19.4
1991–92	USC	**31**	632	55.0%	**25.0%**	69.7%	8.4	1.5	1.8	1.7	20.4
1992–93	USC	29	543	**55.8%**	**25.0%**	**73.5%**	9.8	2.0	2.1	**3.3**	18.7
1993–94	USC	30	657	**55.8%**	8.0%	68.7%	**12.3**	**2.8**	**2.3**	3.1	**21.9**
Career		120	2414	53.4%	18.9%	69.8%	10.1	1.7	1.9	2.7	20.1

== WNBA career ==
The WNBA was incorporated in 1996 and began playing in 1997. Leslie was drafted on January 22 by the Los Angeles Sparks as part of the Initial Allocation phase of the draft. Her debut game was played on June 21, 1997, in a 67 - 57 loss to the New York Liberty. In her first game, Leslie recorded 16 points, 14 rebounds, 2 assists and 2 blocks. Due to her performance, Leslie has the distinction of recording the first double-double in WNBA history. Ruthie Bolton of the Sacramento Monarchs also recorded a double-double of 16 points and 11 rebounds on June 21, 1997, against the Utah Starzz. But chronologically, the Sparks vs. Liberty game was played before the Monarchs vs. Starzz game.

Leslie helped the Sparks make the playoffs five consecutive times, but the team did not win a WNBA title until 2001. That year, Leslie was named the 2001 Sportswoman of the Year (in the team category) by the Women's Sports Foundation.

On July 30, 2002, Leslie became the first woman to dunk the ball in a WNBA game. That same year she became the first WNBA player to score over 3,000 total career points and contributed to the Sparks winning their second straight WNBA championship that season. Two seasons later, she became the first player to reach the 4,000-career point milestone. Leslie remains the Sparks' career scoring and rebounding leader. She is the 4th highest all-time rebound leader, after Rebekkah Brunson, Sylvia Fowles, and Tamika Catchings. Within that same season, she also became the third player in WNBA history to record a triple double, when she had 29 points, 15 rebounds and 10 blocks. In the 2005 WNBA All-Star Game, Leslie had also become the first WNBA player to dunk in an all-star game. On August 11, 2009, Leslie became the first player to score 6,000 points in a career. Earlier that month she was the first player to reach 10,000 career PRA (points + rebounds + assists), a statistic fundamental to the WNBA "Pick One Challenge" fantasy game.

Leslie announced her retirement effective at the end of the 2009 season on February 4, 2009. The Sparks held a farewell ceremony for Leslie during their final home game of the season in September. She finished holding the league records for points (6,263), rebounds (3,307) and PRA (10,444).

Leslie's final WNBA game ever was Game 3 of the 2009 Western Conference Finals between the Sparks and the Phoenix Mercury. Although Leslie recorded 22 points and 9 rebounds, the Sparks lost the game 74 - 85 and were eliminated from the playoffs.

In 2011, she was voted in by fans as one of the Top 15 players in the fifteen-year history of the WNBA. In 2016, she was voted into the WNBA Top 20@20, in celebration of the league's 20th anniversary.

On September 20, 2026, Leslie was honored with a statue of herself outside of Crypto.com Arena.

== National team career ==
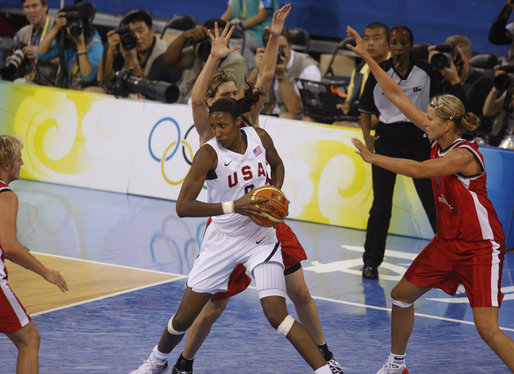
Leslie playing against Spain during the 2008 Summer Olympics.

Leslie was named to the USA Basketball Women's Junior National Team (now called the U19 team). She was 17 at the time, the youngest player on the USA team. The team participated in the second Junior World Championship, held in Bilbao, Spain in July 1989. The USA team lost their opening game to South Korea in overtime, then lost a two-point game to Australia. After winning their next game against Bulgaria, behind 22 points and nine rebounds from Leslie, the USA team again fell in a close game, losing by three points to Czechoslovakia. After beating Zaire in their next game, the USA team played Spain, and fell three points short. Leslie led the team in scoring, rebounds, and blocks, averaging 13.3 points and 7.0 rebounds per game and recording 21 blocks over the course of the event. The USA team finished in seventh place.

Leslie was a member of the USA team competing at the 1991 World University Games held in Sheffield, England. Leslie was the second leading scorer on the USA squad, averaging 13.0 points per game, and helped the Tara VanDerveer-coached team to a 7–0 record and the gold medal.

She competed with USA Basketball as a member of the 1992 Jones Cup Team that won the Gold in Taipei for the first time since 1987.

Leslie has made four consecutive Olympic appearances, and has earned four gold medals. She was the second female basketball player ever to earn that many gold medals, after Teresa Edwards. Leslie has also made appearances with the United States national women's basketball team where she won gold medals in 1996 and 2000, and has also earned a world championship. Leslie scored 35 points against Japan in the semifinals of the 1996 Olympics to set an American Olympic women's scoring record.

Leslie is one of seven USA Basketball's three-time Olympians, and one of two players with four gold medals. She led the U.S. team in scoring during the 2004 Olympic Games. During her third Olympic completion, she became the USA's all-time leading scorer, rebounder, and shot blocker in Olympic competition. Every time she has competed in a major international event, she has compiled double-digit scoring averages. Leslie, at age 20, was also the youngest player to participate at the USA Olympic Trials in 1992.

Leslie has had a rivalry with Lauren Jackson ever since the 2000 Olympics, when the Australian star ripped out Leslie's hair extensions during a game.

== WNBA career statistics ==
Legend
GP	Games played	GS	Games started	MPG	Minutes per game	RPG	Rebounds per game
APG	Assists per game	SPG	Steals per game	BPG	Blocks per game	PPG	Points per game
TO	Turnovers per game	FG%	Field-goal percentage	3P%	3-point field-goal percentage	FT%	Free-throw percentage
**Bold**	Career best	°	League leader

†	Denotes seasons in which Leslie won a WNBA championship
‡	WNBA record

=== Regular season ===
WNBA regular season statistics
Year	Team	GP	GS	MPG	FG%	3P%	FT%	RPG	APG	SPG	BPG	TO	PPG
1997	Los Angeles	28	28	32.2	.431	.261	.598	9.5°	2.6	1.4	2.1	3.89	15.9
1998	Los Angeles	28	28	32.1	.478	.391	.768	10.2°	2.5	1.5	2.1	3.64	19.6
1999	Los Angeles	32	32	29.1	.468	**.423**	.731	7.8	1.8	1.1	1.5	2.94	15.6
2000	Los Angeles	32	32	32.1	.458	.219	**.824**	9.6	1.9	1.0	2.3	3.22	17.8
2001^{†}	Los Angeles	31	31	33.3	.473	.367	.736	9.6	2.4	1.1	2.3	3.16	19.5
2002^{†}	Los Angeles	31	31	34.2	.466	.324	.727	**10.4**	2.7	1.5	**2.9**	3.48	16.9
2003	Los Angeles	23	23	**34.4**	.442	.324	.617	10.0	2.0	1.3	2.7	2.83	18.4
2004	Los Angeles	**34**	**34**	33.8	.494	.273	.712	9.9°	2.6	1.5	**2.9**°	3.24	17.6
2005	Los Angeles	**34**	**34**	32.2	.440	.206	.586	7.3	2.6	**2.0**	2.1	2.94	15.2
2006	Los Angeles	**34**	**34**	30.7	.511	.400	.650	9.5	**3.2**	1.5	1.7	3.71	**20.0**
2008	Los Angeles	33	33	32.1	.463	.235	.661	8.9	2.4	1.5	**2.9**°	3.61	15.1
2009	Los Angeles	23	21	27.7	**.518**	.167	.722	6.6	2.1	0.7	1.4	**2.60**	15.4
Career	12 years, 1 team	363	361	32.0	.470	.316	.695	9.1	2.4	1.4	2.3	3.34	17.3

=== Playoffs ===
WNBA playoff statistics
Year	Team	GP	GS	MPG	FG%	3P%	FT%	RPG	APG	SPG	BPG	TO	PPG
1999	Los Angeles	4	4	36.3	.483	.308	.778	8.5	2.8	1.0	1.5	3.50	19.0
2000	Los Angeles	4	4	34.8	.491	.000	**.826**	10.3	2.0	0.2	1.2	3.25	18.8
2001^{†}	Los Angeles	7	7	37.1	.492	.429	.740	**12.3**°	3.0	1.7	**4.4**°	3.71	**22.3**
2002^{†}	Los Angeles	6	6	**38.7**	.535	**.625**	.731	7.8	1.8	1.8	2.8	1.33	19.3
2003	Los Angeles	**9**	**9**	36.3	**.540**	.333	.704	8.9	2.6	1.3	3.1	2.67	20.8°
2004	Los Angeles	3	3	36.7	.452	.000	.750	8.7	0.7	0.3	2.7	2.67	11.3
2005	Los Angeles	2	2	33.5	.357	.000	.615	6.5	**3.5**	**2.5**	1.5	**1.00**	9.0
2006	Los Angeles	5	5	32.6	.308	.333	.759	7.2	1.8	0.8	1.6	3.40	12.6
2008	Los Angeles	6	6	32.0	.516	.500	.625	8.8	2.2	1.2	2.8	4.33	13.8
2009	Los Angeles	6	6	34.6	.452	.000	.615	9.2	2.0	1.3	1.5	2.17	16.7
Career	10 years, 1 team	52	52	35.4	.480	.390	.711	9.1	2.3	1.3	2.5‡	2.90	17.5

== Other professional endeavors ==
Apart from basketball, Leslie is also a fashion model and an aspiring actress. She has been featured in Vogue and Newsweek, as well as many sports publications. She has been on ESPN numerous times and has been a guest star on several television shows such as Sister Sister, The Game, and One on One. She is a guest commentator for "Sports Zone" on KABC-TV/Los Angeles and wears the Circle 7 logo from the channel when on the show. She has also acted in a variety of commercials. Early in her career she signed a modeling contract with the Wilhelmina modeling agency. Leslie appeared on the show, Superstars, and she and her partner, David Charvet, took third place after David injured his wrist. Leslie also played herself in an episode of the TV-show The Jersey called "Nick's a Chick", where she switched bodies with a boy named Nick Lighter (played by Michael Galeota). In addition, she played herself in one episode of The Simpsons. She also appeared in the movie Think Like a Man, and played as herself. Leslie is also a playable character in the original Backyard Basketball, alongside Kevin Garnett. She was only the fourth female professional athlete in the Backyard Sports series, after soccer players Brianna Scurry, Brandi Chastain, and Tiffeny Milbrett. She also appeared in the second episode of All in with Cam with host Cam Newton. In 2013, Leslie switched places with Downtown Julie Brown on the show Celebrity Wife Swap. On January 28, 2016, it was announced that she would be a contestant in The New Celebrity Apprentice (also known as Celebrity Apprentice 8). Recently, she played septuagenarian Betty Lou in Uncle Drew which hit the theaters in June 2018.

Since her retirement from professional basketball, Leslie has worked as a sports commentator and analyst for several sports networks, such as NBC, ABC and Fox Sports Net. She had also released an autobiography called Don't Let the Lipstick Fool You. In 2011, she had become a co-owner of the Los Angeles Sparks. In 2018, Leslie joined Fox Sports Florida as a studio analyst on Orlando Magic broadcasts.

Leslie was named coach of the Triplets - an expansion team of the BIG3 three-on-three league founded by Ice Cube - on January 10, 2019, and that year led the team to a 7–1 record, and winning the BIG3 Championship.

== Personal life ==
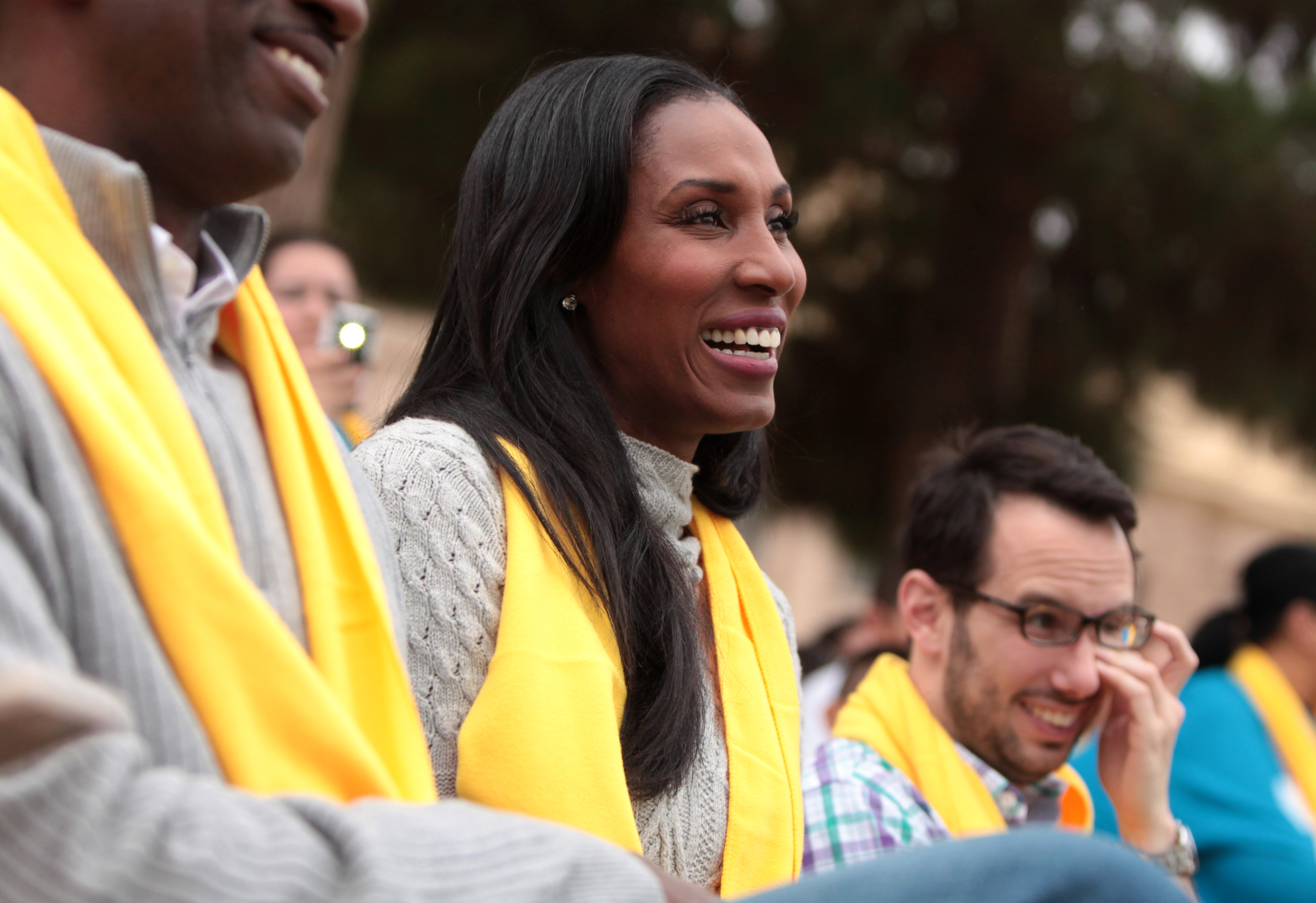
Leslie at an event hosted by National School Choice Week in Phoenix, Arizona.

On November 5, 2005, Leslie married Michael Lockwood, who played basketball for the United States Air Force Academy and is a pilot for UPS. In 2007, she took a year's leave from professional basketball for a pregnancy, and her daughter was born that same year. Leslie returned to the WNBA for the 2008 season. Leslie had a son, Michael II, in 2010.

Leslie is a Christian. In an interview, she spoke about her faith, "As a prayerful kid, I was always putting my faith and goals in the Lord's name. That was always one of the things that helped me the most. I always wanted to fulfill His purpose. I think that's really been the saving grace for me. When you have faith, you have to step out on it [and trust God]."

On February 4, 2020, Leslie was interviewed by Gayle King to talk about her friendship with Kobe Bryant. During the interview, Leslie was asked about Bryant's sexual assault case in 2003. Leslie responded that those accusations did not align with the person she knew.

Leslie is a realtor and co-founder of a sports and entertainment real-estate firm named Aston Rose.

Leslie was initiated as an honorary member of Alpha Kappa Alpha sorority on July 15, 2021.

== See also ==
- List of basketball players who have scored 100 points in a single game
- List of WNBA career rebounding leaders
- List of multiple Olympic gold medalists in one event
- WBCBL Professional Basketball Trailblazer Award

Awards and achievements
Preceded by Monica Seles	Flo Hyman Memorial Award; 2001	Succeeded by Dot Richardson
