= Boston Ball Hogs =

- Leagues: BIG3
- Founded: 8 March 2017; 9 years ago
- History: Ball Hogs (2017-2024); Boston Ball Hogs (2025-present)
- Arena: TD Garden
- Location: Boston, Massachusetts, United States
- Team colors: Green, Yellow, White
- Head coach: Gary Payton
- Championships: 1 (2026)
- Website: big3.com/teams/boston-ball-hogs

The Boston Ball Hogs are an American men's 3-on-3 basketball team based in Boston, Massachusetts that plays in the BIG3. Originally without a home city for the BIG3's first seven seasons, the Ball Hogs were announced to be based in Boston when the league switched to a city-based model for the 2025 season.

In 2022, the Web3 Decentralized Autonomous Organization "Krause House" purchased all available ownership NFTs available through the BIG3's sale.

The fan section of the Ball Hogs is known as the "Pig Pen".

== 2017 ==
=== Draft ===
Pick	Player	NBA experience	Last Club
7	Derrick Byars	2 years	(United States) Delaware 87ers
10	Rasual Butler	14 years	(United States) San Antonio Spurs
18	Dominic McGuire	7 years	(Puerto Rico) Leones de Ponce

== 2018 ==
=== Draft ===
Pick	Player	NBA experience	Last Club
1	Andre Owens	2 years	(Austria) BC Zepter Vienna
7	Corsley Edwards	1 year	(Turkey) İstanbul Teknik Üniversitesi
14	Jermaine Taylor	2 years	(United States) Salt Lake City Stars

== Current roster ==
2025 Boston Ball Hogs roster
Players

Pos.	No.	Player	Height	Weight	DOB	From
SG	-	Kevin Murphy (C)	6 ft 6 in (1.98 m)	185 lb (84 kg)	1990-03-06	Tennessee Tech
G/F	-	Jonathon Simmons (CC)	6 ft 6 in (1.98 m)	195 lb (88 kg)	1989-09-14	Houston
C	-	Deshawn Stephens (CC)	6 ft 8 in (2.03 m)	225 lb (102 kg)	1989-10-09	San Diego State
G	-	Dominique Johnson	6 ft 4 in (1.93 m)	195 lb (88 kg)	1987-06-09	Azusa Pacific
PF	-	Chris Johnson	6 ft 11 in (2.11 m)	231 lb (105 kg)	1985-07-17	LSU

Coaches
Head coach
- Gary Payton

Legend
- (DP) Unsigned draft pick
- (FA) Free agent
- (S) Suspended
- (CC) Team co-captain
- Injured

Roster
Updated: 2025-06-30

== Head coaches ==
Years Active	Name	BIG3 Championships
2017-2024	Rick Barry	0
2025-present	Gary Payton	1
