= DMV Trilogy =

- Leagues: BIG3
- Founded: 8 February 2017; 9 years ago
- Capacity: CFG Bank Arena
- Location: Baltimore, Maryland, United States
- Team colors: Red, black, white
- Head coach: Stephen Jackson
- Championships: 3 (2017, 2021, 2022)

The DMV Trilogy are an American men's 3-on-3 basketball team based in Baltimore, Maryland (using the DMV acronym that stands for the District of Columbia, Maryland and Virginia) that plays in the BIG3. Trilogy won the inaugural season of the BIG3 in 2017, completing a perfect season. They are the only team to win 3 BIG3 championships.

Originally without a home city for their first seven seasons, the Trilogy were announced to be based in Baltimore when the league switched to a city-based model for the 2025 season.

== 2024 ==
=== Draft ===
Pick	Player	NBA experience	Last club
4	Roscoe Smith	0 years	(Dominican Republic) RANS PIK Basketball
12	James White	3 years	(Italy) Pallacanestro Reggiana

== Current roster ==
2025 DMV Trilogy roster
Players

Pos.	No.	Player	Height	Weight	DOB	From
PF	-	Earl Clark (C)	6 ft 9 in (2.06 m)	234 lb (106 kg)	1988-01-17	Louisville
PG	-	Isaiah Briscoe (CC)	6 ft 3 in (1.91 m)	216 lb (98 kg)	1996-04-13	Kentucky
C	-	Isaiah Austin (CC)	7 ft 1 in (2.16 m)	225 lb (102 kg)	1993-10-25	Baylor
C/M	-	Donté Greene	6 ft 11 in (2.11 m)	226 lb (103 kg)	1988-02-21	Syracuse
C/G	-	Franklin Session	6 ft 2 in (1.88 m)	175 lb (79 kg)	1989-01-23	Cal State LA

Coaches
Head coach
- Stephen Jackson

Legend
- (DP) Unsigned draft pick
- (FA) Free agent
- (S) Suspended
- (CC) Team co-captain
- Injured

Roster
Updated: 2018-06-23

== Head coaches ==
Years Active	Name	BIG3 Championships
2017-2018	Rick Mahorn	1
2019	Kenyon Martin	0
2021-present	Stephen Jackson	2
