= Joe Johnson (basketball) =

American basketball player (born 1981)

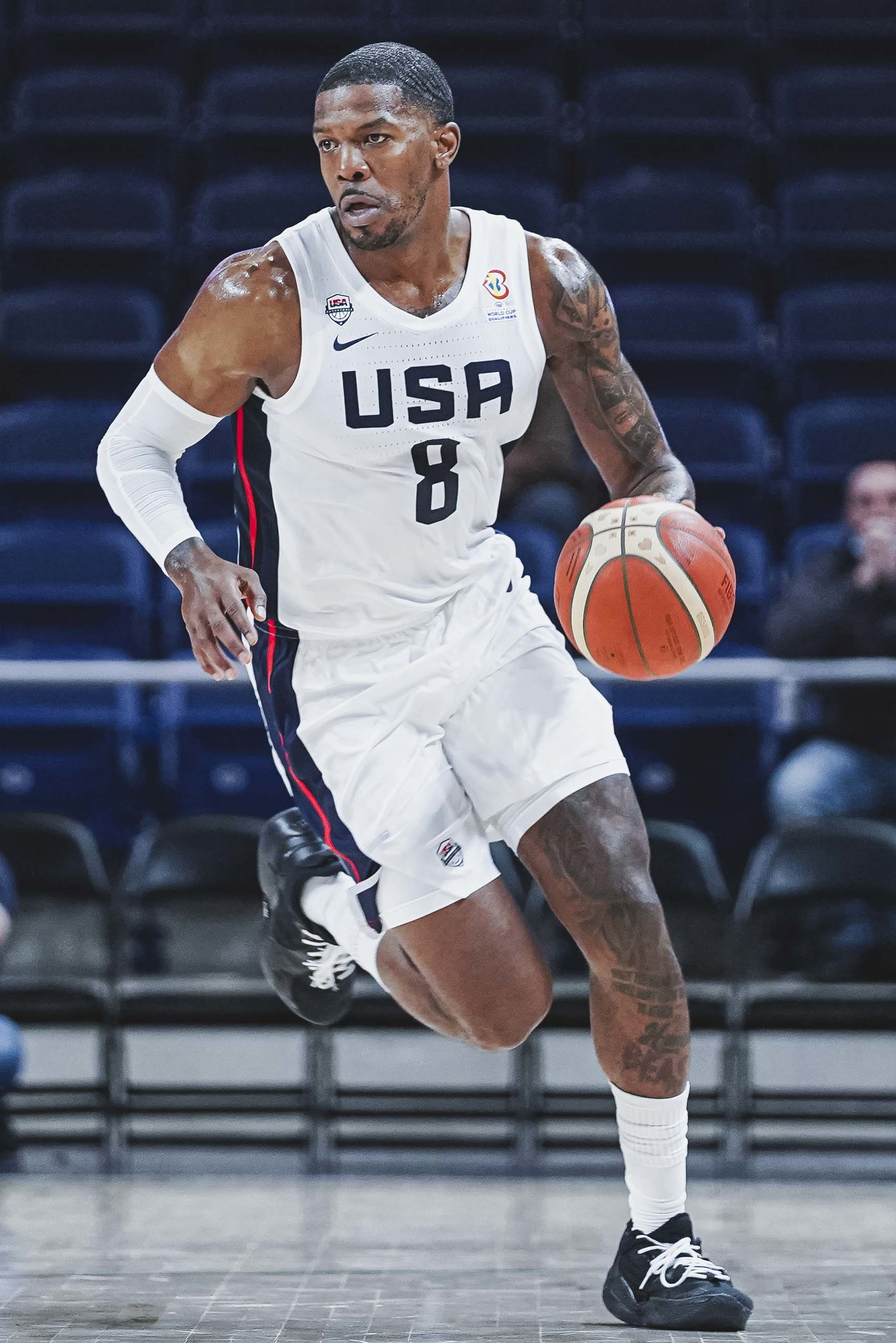
- Johnson with the U.S. national team in 2022

Personal information
- Born: June 29, 1981 (age 45) Little Rock, Arkansas, U.S.
- Listed height: 6 ft 7 in (2.01 m)
- Listed weight: 240 lb (109 kg)

Career information
- High school: Little Rock Central (Little Rock, Arkansas)
- College: Arkansas (1999–2001)
- NBA draft: 2001: 1st round, 10th overall pick
- Drafted by: Boston Celtics
- Playing career: 2001–2018, 2021–2022
- Position: Shooting guard / small forward
- Number: 31, 2, 7, 6, 55

Career history
- 2001–2002: Boston Celtics
- 2002–2005: Phoenix Suns
- 2005–2012: Atlanta Hawks
- 2012–2016: Brooklyn Nets
- 2016: Miami Heat
- 2016–2018: Utah Jazz
- 2018: Houston Rockets
- 2021–2022: Boston Celtics

Career highlights
- 7× NBA All-Star (2007–2012, 2014); All-NBA Third Team (2010); NBA All-Rookie Second Team (2002); Second-team All-SEC (2001); SEC Rookie of the Year (2000); SEC All-Freshman Team (2000); Arkansas Mr. Basketball (1999)

Career statistics
- Points: 20,407 (16.0 ppg)
- Rebounds: 5,059 (4.0 rpg)
- Assists: 5,001 (3.9 apg)
- Stats at NBA.com
- Stats at Basketball Reference
Medals
Men's basketball
Representing the United States
World Championships
Bronze medal – third place	2006 Japan	National team

Joe Marcus Johnson (born June 29, 1981) is an American former professional basketball player. Nicknamed "Iso Joe" for his skills on isolation plays, he spent 18 seasons in the NBA with seven different franchises and is one of 52 players in the association's history to score over 20,000 career points.

After two years of college basketball with the Arkansas Razorbacks, Johnson declared for the 2001 NBA draft and was drafted 10th overall by the Boston Celtics. He then spent the remainder of his career at the Phoenix Suns, Atlanta Hawks, Brooklyn Nets, Miami Heat, Utah Jazz and Houston Rockets, making seven NBA All-Star appearances and becoming a United States international. Upon his retirement, Johnson was the last active player in the NBA to have shared the court with Michael Jordan.

== Early life ==
Born in Little Rock, Arkansas, Johnson was a member of the William E. Thrasher Boys & Girls Club as a child and attended Little Rock Central High School, a school that had produced other professional athletes including Baseball Hall of Famers Brooks Robinson and Bill Dickey, as well as football player Fred Williams and collegiate football coach Houston Nutt. In his senior year, he led the Tigers to a state title, averaging 18.5 points, 7.8 rebounds, and 5.2 assists, and was named Arkansas Mr. Basketball.

== College career ==
In his freshman season at Arkansas in 1999–2000, Johnson was named to the SEC All-Freshman team and SEC All-Tournament team after averaging 16.0 points, 5.7 rebounds, 2.2 assists and 2.0 steals per game. Johnson led Arkansas to the 2000 SEC men's basketball tournament championship.

In his sophomore season in 2000–01, Johnson was named to the All-SEC second team and SEC All-Tournament team, while also receiving honorable mention All-American honors. In 30 games, he averaged 14.2 points, 6.4 rebounds, 2.6 assists and 1.4 steals per game.

== Professional career ==
=== Boston Celtics (2001–2002) ===
Following his sophomore season at Arkansas, Johnson declared for the 2001 NBA draft where he went on to be selected with the 10th overall pick by the Boston Celtics. Through the first half of the 2001–02 season, Johnson played 48 games for the Celtics and made 33 starts, as he averaged 6.3 points, 2.9 rebounds and 1.5 assists per game. He was later traded to the Phoenix Suns on February 20, 2002, along with Randy Brown, Milt Palacio and a first-round pick in exchange for Rodney Rogers and Tony Delk.

=== Phoenix Suns (2002–2005) ===
Johnson became a force with Phoenix as he averaged 14.0 points per game in his three and a half seasons with the Suns, becoming a clutch three-point shooter as he averaged 39.3% from the three-point arc during his tenure with the Suns.

During the 2004–05 campaign, Johnson and the Suns posted a 62–20 record. Johnson's three point accuracy improved dramatically between 2004 and 2005, shooting 30.5% on threes in 2004 and 47.8% in 2005, and shooting .556 in the 2005 playoffs. In the 2005 NBA playoffs, Johnson required surgery to repair a left orbital bone fracture sustained following a dunk attempt against the Dallas Mavericks in the second round. Johnson missed the remainder of the series against the Mavericks as well as the first two games of the Western Conference Finals against the San Antonio Spurs. When he returned, Johnson wore a face mask for protection. The Suns fell to the eventual NBA champion Spurs, 4 games to 1.

=== Atlanta Hawks (2005–2012) ===
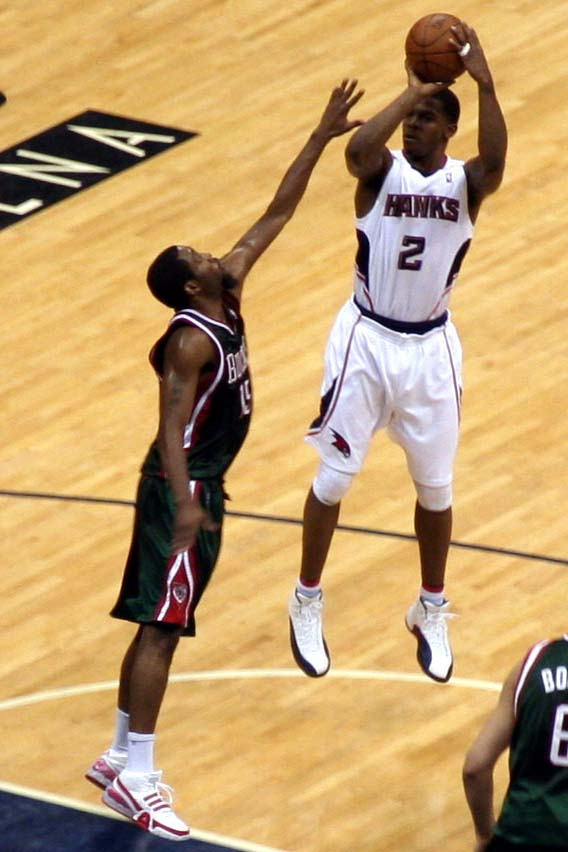
Johnson with the Hawks in February 2010, shooting over John Salmons of the Milwaukee Bucks

In the summer of 2005, Johnson became a highly touted restricted free agent and expressed a desire to leave the Suns to assume a larger role on the Atlanta Hawks. Johnson particularly grew upset with Phoenix's initial offers to re-sign him feeling they were well below his market value. This rift eventually led to Johnson requesting the Suns not match Atlanta's $70 million offer. On August 19, 2005, a deal was finalized and Johnson was involved in a sign-and-trade deal with the Hawks for future teammate Boris Diaw and two future first-round draft picks.

In his first season as a Hawk, Johnson led Atlanta in several categories: points (20.2 per game), assists (6.5), steals (1.26), three-point field goals made (128) and minutes (40.7). He was one of only five players in the league to average at least 20 points and six assists in the 2005–06 season, along with Allen Iverson, Dwyane Wade, LeBron James and Gilbert Arenas. Johnson was also the only Hawk to play in all 82 games in 2005–06.

Johnson scored a career-high 42 points on March 7, 2006, against the Golden State Warriors and recorded a career-high 17 assists on March 13, 2006, against the Milwaukee Bucks. He recorded his first career triple-double on February 1, 2006, with 15 points, 10 rebounds and 11 assists against the Charlotte Bobcats.

Johnson continued his development in the 2006–07 season, when he averaged 25.0 points, 4.4 assists, 4.2 rebounds and 1.1 steals per game. His scoring average ranked ninth in the league. Johnson also shot a career-best 47.1% from the field and was subsequently named to the 2007 Eastern Conference All-Star team, replacing the injured Jason Kidd.

In 2008, Johnson made the 2008 All-Star Game as a reserve. He also was named Eastern Conference Player of the Month twice during the season. Johnson averaged 21.7 points per game on the season, leading the Hawks to their first playoff appearance in nine years. In Game 4 of the Hawks' first-round matchup against the Boston Celtics, Johnson scored 35 points, including 20 in the 4th quarter, leading the Hawks to a 97–92 victory.

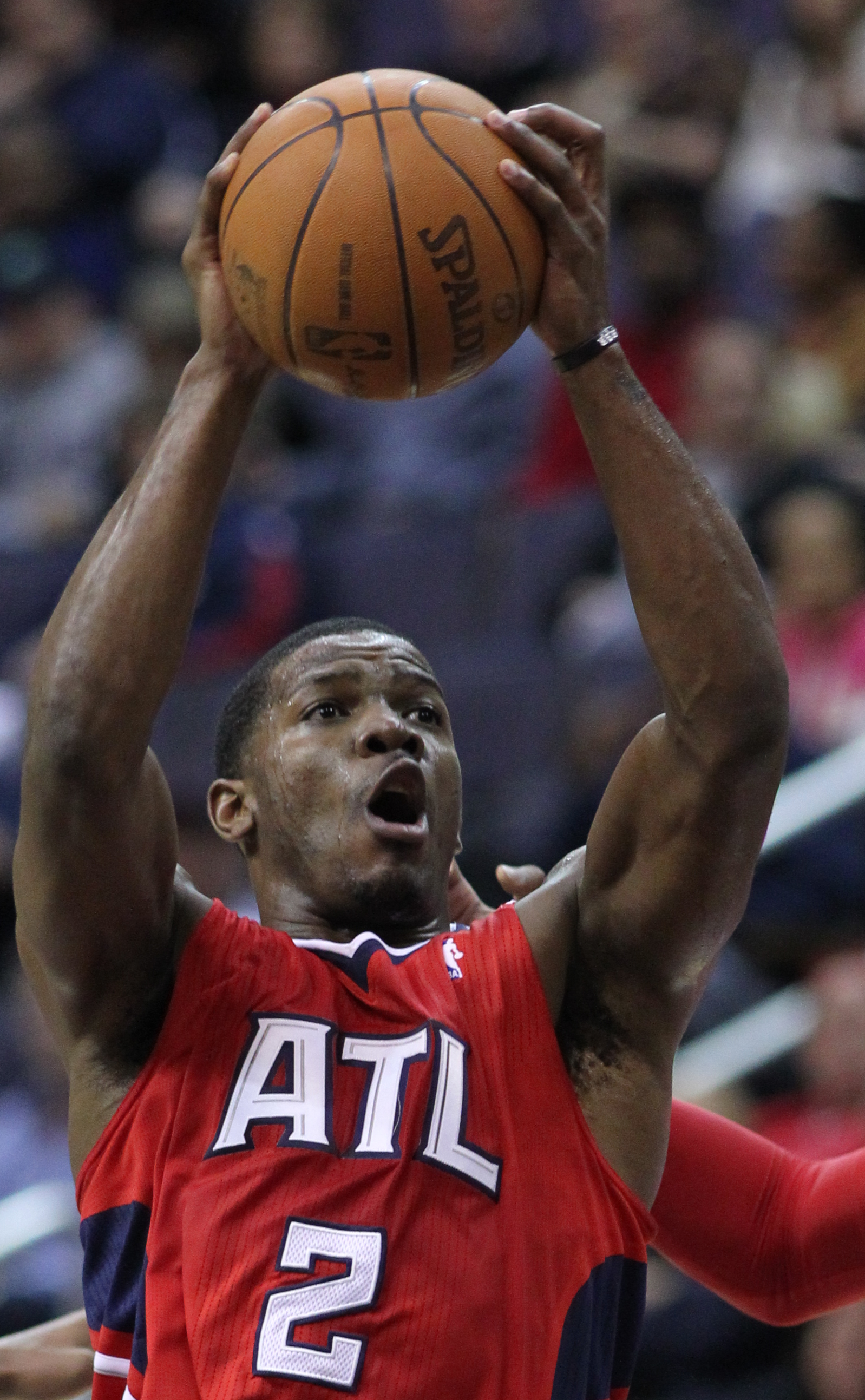
Johnson with the Hawks in March 2012

Despite finishing with the worst record (37–45) among the 2008 NBA Playoffs contingent, the Hawks played very even with the heavily favored and eventual NBA champion Boston Celtics, taking the Eastern Conference No. 1 seed all the way to Game 7. The year marked a turning of the page for the Atlanta franchise, once considered among the least successful in pro sports.

The following year, Johnson registered his second career triple-double on December 23, 2008, in a Hawks win against the Oklahoma City Thunder, with 20 points, 11 rebounds and 11 assists. He eclipsed the 10,000-point plateau for his career with his first basket during a 110–107 loss to the Milwaukee Bucks on January 31, 2009, a bank shot assisted by Marvin Williams. On March 19, 2010, Johnson hit a game-winning buzzer beater in overtime against the Charlotte Bobcats.

On July 8, 2010, Johnson re-signed with the Hawks to a six-year, $123.7 million contract, which, at the time, made him the NBA's highest-paid player. The signing occurred during one of the most star-studded free agency summers in league history, highlighted by LeBron James’s The Decision. Among others who signed high-profile deals were Chris Bosh, Dwyane Wade, Amar'e Stoudemire, Paul Pierce, Ray Allen and Dirk Nowitzki.

=== Brooklyn Nets (2012–2016) ===
On July 11, 2012, Johnson was traded to the Brooklyn Nets in exchange for Jordan Farmar, Anthony Morrow, Jordan Williams, Johan Petro, DeShawn Stevenson and a 2013 first round draft pick. After a slow start to the 2012–13 season, Johnson began to pick up his play in December, with a 32-point game against the Golden State Warriors on December 7 and a game-winning buzzer beater in double overtime against the Detroit Pistons on December 14. After scoring 33 points in a road win over the Oklahoma City Thunder on January 2, he hit another game winner in double overtime two days later to beat the Washington Wizards. In a 113–111 victory over the Milwaukee Bucks on February 19, Johnson made the game-tying three-pointer with just under three seconds to go in regulation and went on to hit the game-winning pull-up jump shot in overtime. With this win, the Nets snapped a thirteen-game losing streak against the Bucks. The next game the Nets played, Johnson injured his left heel and was forced to miss three games. He made his return on March 1 against the Dallas Mavericks.

On November 15, 2013, Johnson made his first game-winning basket of the season against the Phoenix Suns as he went in for a layup to give the Nets their first road win of the 2013–14 season. On December 16, 2013, Johnson recorded a career-high 10 three-pointers in a 130–94 win over the Philadelphia 76ers. In the third quarter, Johnson scored 29 points on 10-of-13 shooting from the field including 8-of-10 three-pointers. On January 2, 2014, after the Nets were down by sixteen points, Johnson made his second game-winning basket of the season to lead the Nets to a 95–93 win to give Oklahoma City Thunder its second home loss of the season. Johnson later earned his seventh All-Star game selection.

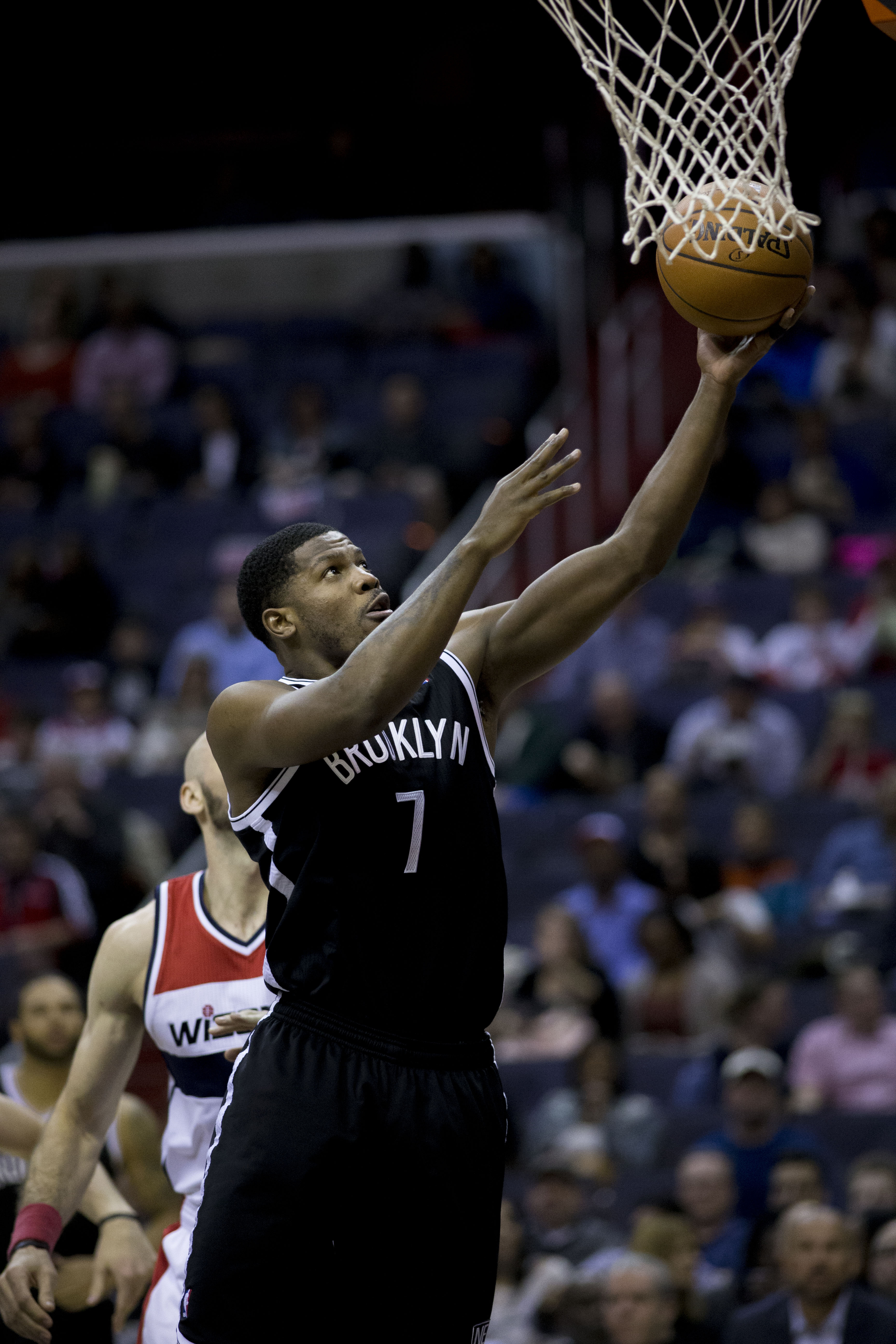
Johnson with the Nets in 2014

In just the second game of the 2014–15 season on November 1, Johnson scored a season-high 34 points on 14-of-23 shooting to help the Nets defeat the Detroit Pistons, 102–90. On February 25, in a game against the New Orleans Pelicans, he became just the seventh player in NBA history to record 18,000 career points and 1,600 career three-pointers made.

On November 14, 2015, in a loss to the Golden State Warriors, Johnson appeared in his 1,072nd NBA regular season game, matching Michael Jordan for 77th on the all-time list. On November 28, in a loss to the Cleveland Cavaliers, he extended his streak of making at least one field goal to 900 regular season games, the longest active streak. He extended that streak to 919 games on January 6, 2016, in a loss to the Toronto Raptors. Three days later, he hit two three-pointers against the Detroit Pistons, thus surpassing Peja Stojaković for 11th on the career three-pointers list. On January 24, in a win over the Oklahoma City Thunder, he became the 31st player in NBA history to reach 40,000 minutes. On February 5, he recorded season highs of 27 points and 11 assists in a 128–119 win over the Sacramento Kings. On February 8, he recorded 12 points and 8 assists against the Denver Nuggets, and hit a buzzer-beating three-pointer to lift the Nets to a 105–104 win. In that game, he passed Scottie Pippen for 52nd place on the NBA's all-time scoring list. In the following game two days later, Johnson failed to score against the Memphis Grizzlies, going scoreless in a regular season game for the first time since December 6, 2003, ending the NBA's longest active streak with at least one field goal. He had a basket in 937 straight games. On February 25, Johnson was waived by the Nets in a buyout agreement.

=== Miami Heat (2016) ===
On February 27, 2016, Johnson signed with the Miami Heat. The next day, he made his debut and first start for the Heat in a 98–81 win over the New York Knicks, recording 12 points, three rebounds and three assists in 30 minutes. In his second game for the Heat on March 1 against the Chicago Bulls, Johnson scored 24 points and passed Reggie Theus for 50th on the NBA's career scoring list. On March 12, he scored a season-high 28 points in a 112–104 overtime loss to the Toronto Raptors. Johnson helped the Heat advance to the second round of the playoffs, where they were defeated 4–3 by the Raptors.

=== Utah Jazz (2016–2018) ===
On July 8, 2016, Johnson signed a two-year, $22 million contract with the Utah Jazz. He joined the Jazz with the intention being to come off the bench behind Gordon Hayward. But with an injury to Hayward during preseason, Johnson was thrust into the starting line-up in his absence. He made his debut for the Jazz in their season opener on October 25, scoring a team-high 29 points in a 113–104 loss to the Portland Trail Blazers. With Hayward's return to line-up on November 6 to face the New York Knicks, Johnson came off the bench for the first time since December 9, 2003. On February 8, 2017, Johnson highlighted a 27-point performance with six three-pointers on eight attempts in a 127–94 win over the New Orleans Pelicans. On April 15, 2017, Johnson scored a team-high 21 points off the bench and hit a game-winning floater at the buzzer to give the Jazz a 97–95 win over the Los Angeles Clippers in Game 1 of their first-round playoff series. Eight days later in Game 4, Johnson again paced the Jazz with 28 points off the bench to give them a 105–98 victory and tie the series with the Clippers at 2–2. The Jazz went on to eliminate the Clippers with a 104–91 victory in Game 7, closing out the first-round series 4–3 to earn the franchise's first postseason series victory since 2010.

Johnson missed 21 games early in the 2017–18 season while dealing with a right wrist injury.

On February 8, 2018, Johnson was acquired by the Sacramento Kings in a three-team trade that involved the Jazz and the Cleveland Cavaliers. Three days later, he was waived by the Kings before appearing in a game for them.

=== Houston Rockets (2018) ===
On February 14, 2018, Johnson signed with the Houston Rockets. He made his debut for the Rockets later that day, scoring nine points in 31 minutes off the bench in a 100–91 win over the Sacramento Kings.

=== Triplets Big3 and The Basketball Tournament (2019–2022, 2023-present) ===
In March 2019, Johnson signed to play in the BIG3. On August 27, 2019, Johnson was named BIG3 MVP. On September 1, 2019, he won his first BIG3 championship with the Triplets, defeating the Killer 3's.

On September 19, 2019, Johnson returned to the NBA, signing with the Detroit Pistons. He was later waived by the team on October 21, 2019, with final cuts looming.

Johnson competed for Overseas Elite in The Basketball Tournament 2020, helping them to the semifinals. He was named to the All-Tournament team.

Johnson originally retired during the 2022 BIG3 season, however, he returned to BIG3 for 2023.

=== Return to the Celtics (2021–2022) ===
On December 22, 2021, Johnson signed a 10-day contract with the Boston Celtics to return to the franchise that drafted him after the team was granted a hardship exception. His appearance that same night against the Cleveland Cavaliers marked a 19-year, 305-day gap between his stints with the Celtics, which is the longest gap in NBA history. He also made his lone shot in that appearance, making him the second player along with Dirk Nowitzki to score a basket with the same team at the age of 20 and at the age of 40. His sole appearance for the Celtics in 2021 would be the final appearance of his NBA career. It was his first NBA action in 1,304 days, with his last appearance before that point coming in the 2018 NBA playoffs with the Rockets on May 28, 2018. With his retirement, there were officially no active players left in the NBA who had shared the court with Michael Jordan during their career.

== National team career ==
On March 5, 2006, Johnson was one of 23 NBA players named to the 2006–08 United States national team and played for the United States national team in the 2006 FIBA World Championship. He helped USA win the bronze medal by defeating Argentina in the third place game after a loss to Greece in the semi-finals. In nine games, Johnson averaged 7.3 points.

In February 2021, Johnson was selected to the 14-player roster for the final round of the 2022 FIBA AmeriCup qualification. On February 19, he scored 11 points in a 93–77 victory over the Bahamas. On February 20, he had 11 points, 9 rebounds, 7 assists and 2 blocks in a 96–75 victory against Mexico.

== Career statistics ==
Legend
GP	Games played	GS	Games started	MPG	Minutes per game
FG%	Field goal percentage	3P%	3-point field goal percentage	FT%	Free throw percentage
RPG	Rebounds per game	APG	Assists per game	SPG	Steals per game
BPG	Blocks per game	PPG	Points per game	**Bold**	Career high
*	Led the league

=== NBA ===
==== Regular season ====
Year	Team	GP	GS	MPG	FG%	3P%	FT%	RPG	APG	SPG	BPG	PPG
2001–02	Boston	48	33	20.9	.439	.273	.769	2.9	1.5	.7	.2	6.3
2001–02	Phoenix	29	27	31.5	.420	.333	.778	4.1	3.6	.9	**.4**	9.6
2002–03	Phoenix	**82**	34	27.5	.397	.366	.774	3.2	2.6	.8	.2	9.8
2003–04	Phoenix	**82**	77	40.6	.430	.305	.750	4.7	4.4	1.1	.3	16.7
2004–05	Phoenix	**82**	**82***	39.5	.461	**.478**	.750	**5.1**	3.5	1.0	.3	17.1
2005–06	Atlanta	**82***	**82***	40.7	.453	.356	.791	4.1	**6.5**	**1.3**	**.4**	20.2
2006–07	Atlanta	57	57	**41.4**	.471	.381	.748	4.2	4.4	1.1	.2	**25.0**
2007–08	Atlanta	**82***	**82***	40.8	.432	.381	.834	4.5	5.8	1.0	.2	21.7
2008–09	Atlanta	79	79	39.5	.437	.360	.826	4.4	5.8	1.1	.2	21.4
2009–10	Atlanta	76	76	38.0	.458	.369	.818	4.6	4.9	1.1	.1	21.3
2010–11	Atlanta	72	72	35.5	.443	.297	.802	4.0	4.7	.7	.1	18.2
2011–12	Atlanta	60	60	35.5	.454	.388	.849	3.7	3.9	.8	.2	18.8
2012–13	Brooklyn	72	72	36.7	.423	.375	.820	3.0	3.5	.7	.2	16.3
2013–14	Brooklyn	79	79	32.6	.454	.401	.815	3.4	2.7	.6	.1	15.8
2014–15	Brooklyn	80	80	34.9	.435	.359	.801	4.8	3.7	.7	.2	14.4
2015–16	Brooklyn	57	57	33.9	.406	.371	.852	3.9	4.1	.7	.0	11.8
2015–16	Miami	24	24	32.1	.518	.417	.765	2.8	3.6	.9	.1	13.4
2016–17	Utah	78	14	23.6	.436	.411	.818	3.1	1.8	.5	.2	9.2
2017–18	Utah	32	3	21.9	.420	.274	.833	3.3	1.4	.4	.2	7.3
2017–18	Houston	23	1	22.0	.381	.279	**.952**	2.8	1.7	.3	.0	6.0
2021–22	Boston	1	0	2.0	**1.000**	–	–	.0	.0	.0	.0	2.0
Career		1277	1091	34.6	.441	.371	.802	4.0	3.9	.8	.2	16.0
All-Star		6	1	16.8	.390	.310	.000	.8	1.3	1.2	.0	8.8

==== Playoffs ====
Year	Team	GP	GS	MPG	FG%	3P%	FT%	RPG	APG	SPG	BPG	PPG
2003	Phoenix	6	0	27.3	.275	.154	.400	4.3	1.3	.7	.3	5.3
2005	Phoenix	9	9	39.4	.504	**.556**	.697	4.3	3.3	1.1	**.4**	18.8
2008	Atlanta	7	7	39.3	.409	.444	**.909**	3.9	4.0	.3	.0	20.0
2009	Atlanta	11	11	39.0	.417	.353	.622	4.5	3.5	**1.3**	.0	16.4
2010	Atlanta	11	11	40.0	.387	.220	.810	5.1	**5.0**	.9	.3	17.9
2011	Atlanta	12	12	41.4	.439	.429	.810	4.6	3.3	1.1	.1	18.8
2012	Atlanta	6	6	40.5	.373	.250	.750	3.5	3.5	**1.3**	.2	17.2
2013	Brooklyn	7	7	38.7	.417	.256	.889	3.1	2.7	1.1	.0	14.9
2014	Brooklyn	12	12	39.1	**.533**	.415	.837	3.8	2.9	.5	.3	**21.2**
2015	Brooklyn	6	6	**41.5**	.362	.293	.792	**7.7**	4.8	1.2	.0	16.5
2016	Miami	**14**	**14**	35.1	.430	.283	.875	4.7	2.5	.6	.2	12.1
2017	Utah	11	2	29.7	.436	.333	.733	3.9	2.5	.5	.1	12.9
2018	Houston	8	0	6.8	.353	.000	–	1.3	.4	.0	.1	1.5
Career		120	97	35.5	.427	.339	.779	4.2	3.1	.8	.2	15.2

=== College ===
Year	Team	GP	GS	MPG	FG%	3P%	FT%	RPG	APG	SPG	BPG	PPG
1999–2000	Arkansas	23	14	**31.8**	.464	.368	**.759**	5.7	2.2	**2.0**	**.5**	**16.0**
2000–01	Arkansas	**30**	**27**	29.1	**.468**	**.443**	.747	**6.4**	**2.6**	1.4	.4	14.2
Career		53	41	30.3	.466	.406	.753	6.1	2.4	1.7	.5	15.0

== Post-playing career ==
In 2023, Johnson opened Iso Yoga, a hot yoga studio in Atlanta. The studio offers hot yoga and pilates classes and was established with the goal of providing an inclusive space for people of different ages and backgrounds. According to the studio, Johnson became interested in hot yoga after experiencing its benefits for injury prevention and recovery during his professional basketball career.

In 2025, Johnson joined the podcast Nightcap as a co-host alongside Shannon Sharpe and Chad "Ochocinco" Johnson.

== Personal life ==
Johnson's mother, Diane, was a former state psychiatric hospital nurse. She raised her only son by herself in Little Rock, benefiting from the help of a close family that included her mother and brothers. She was diagnosed in 2008 with multiple myeloma, a rare and typically incurable cancer of bone marrow plasma cells. She died in 2019.

== See also ==
- List of NBA career games played leaders
- List of NBA career scoring leaders
- List of NBA career 3-point scoring leaders
- List of NBA career minutes played leaders
