= 3 Headed Monsters =

- Leagues: BIG3
- Founded: 1 February 2017; 9 years ago
- Location: United States
- Team colors: Purple, green, gold
- Vice-president: Jeff Brodie
- Head coach: Rashard Lewis

The 3 Headed Monsters are an American men's 3-on-3 basketball team that plays in the BIG3.

== 2017 ==
=== Draft ===
Pick	Player	NBA experience	Last Club
5	Kwame Brown	12 years	(United States) Philadelphia 76ers
12	Eddie Basden	1 years	(Brazil) Franca Basquetebol Clube
17	Mahmoud Abdul-Rauf	9 years	(Japan) Kyoto Hannaryz

== 2018 ==
=== Draft ===
Pick	Player	NBA experience	Last Club
11	Salim Stoudamire	3 years	(Venezuela) Guaros de Lara

== Current roster ==
3 Headed Monsters roster
Players
Coaches

Pos.	No.	Nat.	Name	Ht.	Wt.	Age
PG	7	(United States)	Abdul-Rauf, Mahmoud (CC)	1.85 m (6 ft 1 in)	73 kg (161 lb)	57 – 9 March 1969
PF	30	(United States)	Evans, Reggie (CC)	2.03 m (6 ft 8 in)	111 kg (245 lb)	46 – 18 May 1980
F	9	(United States)	Lewis, Rashard (C)	2.08 m (6 ft 10 in)	107 kg (236 lb)	46 – 8 August 1979
SG	55	(United States)	Murphy, Kevin	1.93 m (6 ft 4 in)	96 kg (212 lb)	36 – 6 March 1990
C	34	(Senegal)	N'Diaye, Mamadou	2.13 m (7 ft 0 in)	116 kg (256 lb)	51 – 16 June 1975

Head coach

Reggie Theus

Legend

- (C) Team captain
- (CC) Team co-captain
- Injured

- Roster

== Head coaches ==
Years Active	Name	BIG3 Championships
2017-2021	Gary Payton	0
2022-2023	Reggie Theus	0
2024	Rashard Lewis	0
