= Teddy Gipson =

American basketball player

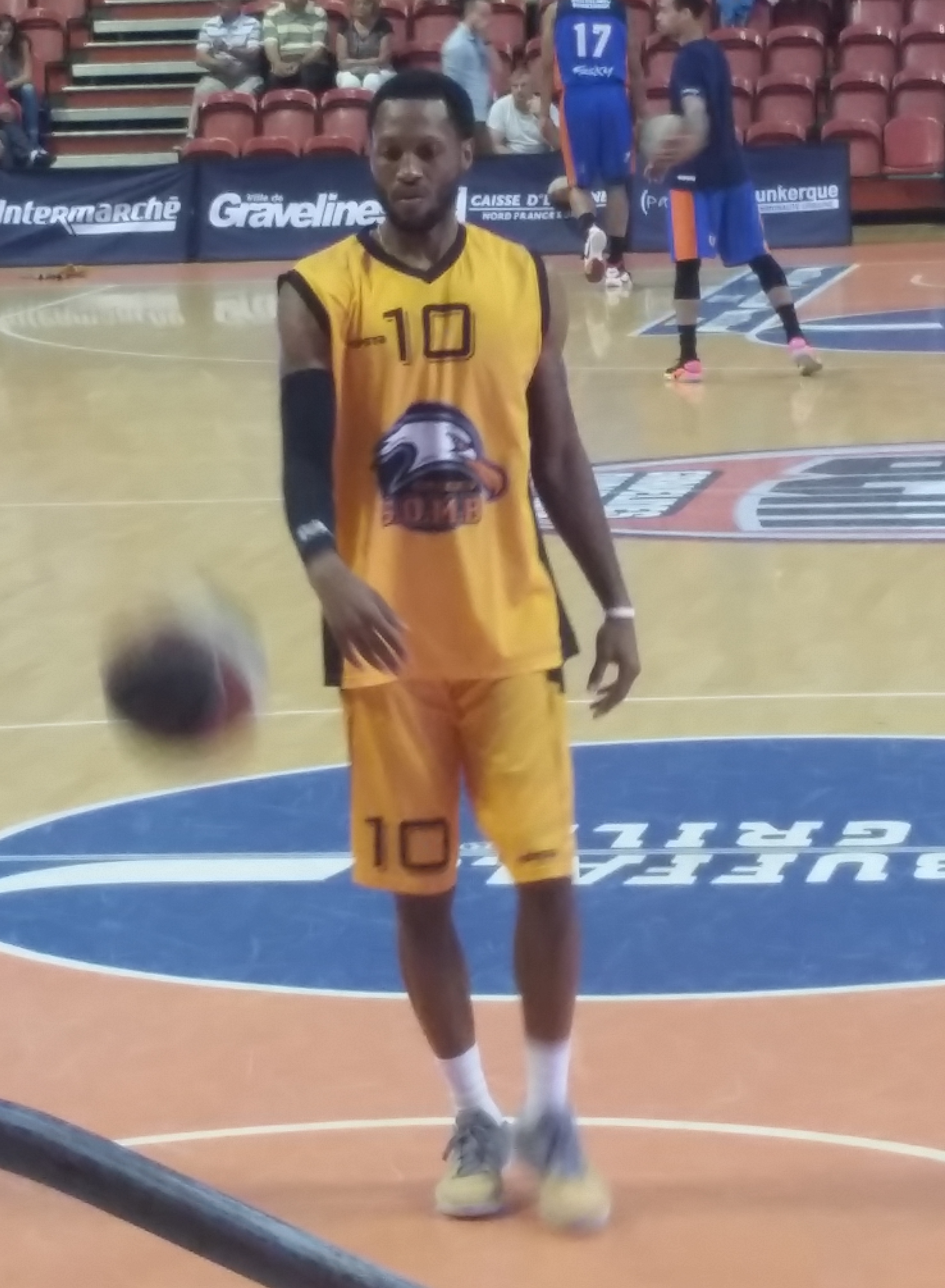
- Gipson with SOMB in 2016

Free agent
- Position: Point guard / shooting guard

Personal information
- Born: February 15, 1980 (age 46) Monroe, Louisiana, U.S.
- Listed height: 6 ft 4 in (1.93 m)
- Listed weight: 195.8 lb (89 kg)

Career information
- High school: Farmerville (Farmerville, Louisiana)
- College: Arkansas (1998–2002)
- NBA draft: 2002: undrafted
- Playing career: 2003–present

Career history
- 2003–2006: MyGuide Amsterdam
- 2006–2007: Paderborn Baskets
- 2007–2009: MyGuide Amsterdam
- 2009–2012: Élan Béarnais Pau-Orthez
- 2012–2013: Brose Baskets
- 2013: Limoges CSP
- 2013–2014: Igokea
- 2014–2015: Szolnoki Olaj
- 2016: Igokea
- 2016: STB Le Havre
- 2016–2017: SOMB
- 2017–2019: Donar

Career highlights
- 4× Dutch League champion (2005, 2008, 2009, 2018); Bosnian League champion (2014); Hungarian League champion (2015); 3× Dutch Cup winner (2004, 2006, 2018); Hungarian Cup winner (2015); Bosnian Cup winner (2016); DBL Dunk Contest Winner (2004); DBL All-Star Game MVP (2006); 2× All-Dutch League Team (2008, 2009); 4× Dutch League All-Star (2004, 2006, 2008, 2009); French League assists leader (2011); French League All-Star (2012); French 2nd Division Foreign Player's MVP (2010)

Sergerio Montez "Teddy" Gipson (born February 15, 1980) is an American professional basketball player who last played for Donar of the Dutch Basketball League (DBL).

== Professional career ==
Gipson started his professional career in 2003 with MyGuide Amsterdam in the Dutch Eredivisie, where he played three seasons. He won the Dutch championship in his debut season.

He signed with Paderborn Baskets of the German second division ProA for the 2006–07 season.

After one season, he returned to Amsterdam to play another two seasons there. In these two seasons, Amsterdam won the Eredivisie both times. On June 1, 2008, Gipson scored 27 points in Game 7 of the Finals, as the 77–72 win over Den Bosch which delivered Amsterdam the title.

In the 2012–13 season, Gipson played with Brose Baskets of the German League and the Euroleague. He left Brose in February 2013 after some dissatisfaction with his role on the team. Later that month he signed with Limoges CSP in France. In November 2013, he signed with Igokea. In November 2014, he moved to Hungary and signed with Szolnoki Olaj for the 2014–15 season.

On January 9, 2016, he returned to Igokea. On March 14, 2016, he left Igokea and signed with French club STB Le Havre for the rest of the season.

On July 22, 2016, Gipson signed with SOMB of the French second tier Pro B.

On October 19, 2017, Gipson signed a two-month contract with Donar of the Dutch Basketball League (DBL) to replace the injured Arvin Slagter. On December 22, 2017, Donar announced Gipson would play for the team for the remainder of the 2017–18 season. In May 2018, Gipson won his fourth Dutch League championship with Donar. On July 30, 2018, Donar announced Gipson re-signed for another season.

== Career statistics ==
Legend
| GP | Games played | GS | Games started | MPG | Minutes per game |
| FG% | Field-goal percentage | 3P% | 3-point field-goal percentage | FT% | Free-throw percentage |
| RPG | Rebounds per game | APG | Assists per game | SPG | Steals per game |
| BPG | Blocks per game | PPG | Points per game | PIR | Performance index rating |
| **Bold** | Career high |

=== EuroLeague ===
| Year | Team | GP | GS | MPG | FG% | 3P% | FT% | RPG | APG | SPG | BPG | PPG | PIR |
|---|---|---|---|---|---|---|---|---|---|---|---|---|---|
| 2012–13 | Brose Baskets | 16 | 10 | 20.3 | .368 | .455 | .632 | 1.4 | 2.1 | 0.4 | 0.1 | 7.6 | 4.3 |
| Career | | 16 | 10 | 20.3 | .368 | .455 | .632 | 1.4 | 2.1 | 0.4 | 0.1 | 7.6 | 4.3 |
