= Andre Owens =

American basketball player and coach

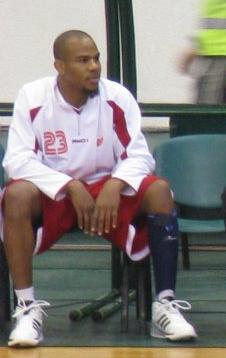

Personal information
- Born: October 31, 1980 (age 46) Indianapolis, Indiana, U.S.
- Listed height: 6 ft 4 in (1.93 m)
- Listed weight: 200 lb (91 kg)

Career information
- High school: Perry Meridian (Indianapolis, Indiana)
- College: Indiana (2000–2001); Houston (2002–2005)
- NBA draft: 2005: undrafted
- Playing career: 2005–2015
- Position: Shooting guard
- Number: 30, 20

Career history

Playing
- 2005–2006: Utah Jazz
- 2006–2007: Anaheim Arsenal
- 2007–2008: Indiana Pacers
- 2008–2009: Crvena zvezda
- 2009–2010: Türk Telekom
- 2010: Lokomotiv Kuban
- 2010: Bàsquet Manresa
- 2010–2011: Granada
- 2011: Donetsk
- 2011–2012: Lukoil Academic
- 2012–2013: Keravnos
- 2014: C.R.D. Libolo
- 2015: Zepter Vienna

Coaching
- 2021: Indy Express

Career highlights
- Bulgarian League All-Star (2012)
- Stats at NBA.com
- Stats at Basketball Reference

Andre Liroy Owens (born October 31, 1980) is an American former professional basketball player who played briefly in the National Basketball Association (NBA). He played college basketball for the Indiana Hoosiers and Houston Cougars.

== High school and college basketball ==
A 6-foot-4-inch (1.93 m) guard, he played competitively at Perry Meridian High School where he was an Indiana All-Star in his senior season. Owens attended Indiana University and then transferred to the University of Houston.

== Professional career ==
Undrafted, he signed with the Utah Jazz as a free agent prior to the start of the 2005-06 NBA season. He was traded to the Golden State Warriors along with Devin Brown and Keith McLeod in exchange for Derek Fisher on July 12, 2006. In October 2006, he was released by the Warriors without playing in any preseason games.

The Indiana Pacers signed Owens to a one-year deal on July 4, 2007.

In September 2008 he moved to Europe, signing a one-year contract with Serbian Adriatic League team Crvena zvezda. In 2009, he signed with Türk Telekom B.K. in Ankara. In 2009, he signed with Lokomotiv Kuban in Krasnodar (Russian Basketball Super League). In October 2010 he signed a one-month contract with Bàsquet Manresa, and after his contract expired in November he signed with CB Granada until the end of the 2010–11 season, but left the team in March 2011. He then signed with the Ukrainian club BC Donetsk.

In December 2014, he signed with C.R.D. Libolo of Angola. On February 27, 2015, he signed with Zepter Vienna of the Österreichische Basketball Bundesliga.

In the summer of 2017, he played in the BIG3 League for 3's Company. He was named the GM of the Indy Express.

== NBA career statistics ==
Legend
GP	Games played	GS	Games started	MPG	Minutes per game
FG%	Field goal percentage	3P%	3-point field goal percentage	FT%	Free throw percentage
RPG	Rebounds per game	APG	Assists per game	SPG	Steals per game
BPG	Blocks per game	PPG	Points per game	**Bold**	Career high

=== Regular season ===
Year	Team	GP	GS	MPG	FG%	3P%	FT%	RPG	APG	SPG	BPG	PPG
2005–06	Utah	23	2	9.1	.365	.188	.667	.9	.3	.2	.0	3.0
2007–08	Indiana	**31**	**7**	**12.6**	**.374**	**.450**	**.735**	**1.5**	**1.5**	**.4**	**.1**	**4.0**
Career		54	9	11.1	.370	.375	.712	1.3	1.0	.3	.0	3.6
