= Killer 3's =

Killer 3s
- Leagues: BIG3
- Founded: 15 February 2017; 9 years ago
- Location: United States
- Team colors: Black, yellow, white
- Head coach: Charles Oakley
- Website: big3.com/index.php/coaches/charles-oakley

The Killer 3s was an American men's 3-on-3 basketball team that plays in the BIG3. The team was purchased in 2022 by NFT Project ‘DeGods’ DAO.

== All Draft Picks ==
=== 2017 Draft ===
Pick	Player	NBA experience	Last club
3	Reggie Evans	13 years	(United States) Sacramento Kings
14	Larry Hughes	13 years	(United States) Orlando Magic
24	Brian Cook	9 years	(Japan) Chiba Jets
Picked up post-draft	Eddie Robinson	6 years	(United States) Chicago Bulls

=== 2018 Draft ===
Pick	Player	NBA experience	Last club
3	Alan Anderson	8 years	(United States) Lakeland Magic
9	Ryan Hollins	10 years	(Italy) Auxilium Pallacanestro Torino
16	Mike James	12 years	(United States) Texas Legends

=== 2019 Draft ===
Pick	Player	NBA experience	Last club
4	Josh Powell	7 years	(South Korea) Changwon LG Sakers
12	Donté Greene	4 years	(Lebanon) Sporting Al Riyadi Beirut
25	C. J. Watson	10 years	(Turkey) Uşak Sportif

== 2020 roster ==
2020 Killer 3's roster
Players

Pos.	No.	Player	Height	Weight	DOB	From
PG	-	C.J. Watson	6 ft 2 in (1.88 m)	175 lb (79 kg)	1984-04-17	Tennessee
G	-	Franklin Session (CC)	6 ft 2 in (1.88 m)	175 lb (79 kg)	1989-01-23	Cal State LA
C	-	Eddy Curry	7 ft 0 in (2.13 m)	350 lb (159 kg)	1982-12-05	Thornwood HS
PF	-	Donte Greene	6 ft 11 in (2.11 m)	226 lb (103 kg)	1988-02-21	Syracuse
PF/C	-	Josh Powell (CC)	6 ft 9 in (2.06 m)	240 lb (109 kg)	1983-01-25	NC State

Coaches
Head coach
- Charles Oakley

Legend
- (DP) Unsigned draft pick
- (FA) Free agent
- (S) Suspended
- (CC) Team co-captain
- Injured

Roster
Updated: 2018-06-23

== 2024 roster ==
2024 Killer 3's roster
Players

Pos.	No.	Player	Height	Weight	DOB	From
G	-	Franklin Session (C)	6 ft 2 in (1.88 m)	175 lb (79 kg)	1989-01-23	Cal State LA
C	-	Dazeran Jones	6 ft 6 in (1.98 m)	185 lb (84 kg)	1993-12-25	Warner
PF	-	Will Felder	6 ft 7 in (2.01 m)	202 lb (92 kg)	1991-03-09	Miami (OH)
PF	-	Donte Greene (CC)	6 ft 11 in (2.11 m)	226 lb (103 kg)	1988-02-21	Syracuse
PF/C	-	Josh Powell (CC)	6 ft 9 in (2.06 m)	240 lb (109 kg)	1983-01-25	NC State

Coaches
Head coach
- Charles Oakley

Legend
- (DP) Unsigned draft pick
- (FA) Free agent
- (S) Suspended
- (CC) Team co-captain
- Injured

Roster
Updated: 2018-06-23

== Head coaches ==
Years Active	Name	BIG3 Championships
2017-2024	Charles Oakley	0
