= 2017 Big3 season =

2017 BIG3 season
- League: BIG3
- Sport: 3x3 basketball
- Duration: June 25, 2017–August 13, 2017; August 20, 2017 (playoffs); August 26, 2017 (championship)
- Games: 32 (regular season)
- Teams: 8
- Total attendance: 99,187
- Average attendance: 11,020
- TV partner(s): FS1 (Tape delay); Fox (Championship game, Live)

Draft
- Top draft pick: Rashad McCants
- Picked by: Trilogy

Regular season
- Season champions: Trilogy
- Runners-up: 3 Headed Monsters

Playoffs
- Champions: Trilogy
- Runners-up: 3 Headed Monsters

Seasons
- 2018 →

The 2017 season was the inaugural BIG3 season. The regular season began on June 25, 2017 and ended on August 13, 2017. On August 26, 2017, Trilogy defeated the 3 Headed Monsters 51–46 in the BIG3 Championship game, completing a perfect (10–0) season.

== Venues ==
Week	Date(s)	Venue	City	Notes
1	June 25, 2017	Barclays Center	Brooklyn, New York	Inaugural venue Attendance: 15,177
2	July 2, 2017	Spectrum Center	Charlotte, North Carolina	Regular season Attendance: 10,651
3	July 9, 2017	BOK Center	Tulsa, Oklahoma	Regular season Attendance: 10,000+
4	July 16, 2017	Wells Fargo Center	Philadelphia, Pennsylvania	Regular season Attendance: 12,435
5	July 23, 2017	UIC Pavilion	Chicago, Illinois	Regular season Attendance: 9,044
6	July 30, 2017	American Airlines Center	Dallas, Texas	Regular season Attendance: 15,000+
7	August 6, 2017	Rupp Arena	Lexington, Kentucky	Regular season Attendance: 8,009
8	August 13, 2017	Staples Center	Los Angeles, California	Regular season Attendance: 10,288
9	August 20, 2017	KeyArena	Seattle, Washington	Playoffs; Attendance: 8,583
10	August 26, 2017	MGM Grand Garden Arena	Las Vegas, Nevada	Championship game

== Draft ==
The inaugural BIG3 draft was held on April 30, 2017 in Las Vegas, Nevada. Twenty-four players were selected across three rounds.

=== Player selections ===
Pick	Player	Team	NBA experience	Last team	Last played
1	Rashad McCants	Trilogy	5 years	(Dominican Republic) Cañeros del Este	2015
2	Andre Owens	3's Company	2 years	(Austria) BC Hallmann Vienna	2015
3	Reggie Evans	Killer 3s	14 years	(United States) Sacramento Kings	2015
4	Xavier Silas	Tri-State	1 year	(United States) Northern Arizona Suns	Active
5	Kwame Brown	3 Headed Monsters	12 years	(United States) Philadelphia 76ers	2013
6	Jerome Williams	Power	7 years	(United States) New York Knicks	2005
7	Derrick Byars	Ball Hogs	1 year	(United States) Delaware 87ers	Active
8	Maurice Evans	Ghost Ballers	9 years	(United States) Washington Wizards	2012
9	Marcus Banks	Ghost Ballers	8 years	(France) SLUC Nancy Basket	2014
10	Rasual Butler	Ball Hogs	13 years	(United States) San Antonio Spurs	2016
11	DeShawn Stevenson	Power	13 years	(United States) Atlanta Hawks	2013
12	Eddie Basden	3 Headed Monsters	1 year	(Brazil) Franca Basquetebol Clube	2014
13	Lee Nailon	Tri-State	6 years	(Mexico) Panteras de Aguascalientes	2014
14	Larry Hughes	Killer 3s	13 years	(United States) Orlando Magic	2012
15	Mike Sweetney	3's Company	4 years	(Uruguay) Urunday Universitario	Active
16	James White	Trilogy	3 years	(Iran) Petrochimi Bandar Imam BC	Active
17	Mahmoud Abdul-Rauf	3 Headed Monsters	9 years	(Japan) Kyoto Hannaryz	2011
18	Dominic McGuire	Ball Hogs	6 years	(Puerto Rico) Leones de Ponce	2016
19	Dion Glover	Trilogy	6 years	(Venezuela) Gaiteros del Zulia	2007
20	Moochie Norris	Power	9 years	(United States) Yakima Sun Kings	2008
21	Ruben Patterson	3's Company	10 years	(Lebanon) Champville SC	2009
22	Ivan Johnson	Ghost Ballers	2 years	(Dominican Republic) Reales de La Vega	2016
23	Mike James	Tri-State	12 years	(United States) Texas Legends	2015
24	Brian Cook	Killer 3s	9 years	(Japan) Chiba Jets	Active

NOTES * Last team does not only refer to NBA teams, it also refers to overseas play such as Euroleague, NBL or any other major international league * Last played refers to last year of being active in any basketball league

== Regular season ==
=== Week 1 (Brooklyn, NY) ===
The inaugural week of games in the Big3 Basketball League took place at the Barclays Center, in Brooklyn, New York. It featured four 3x3 basketball games. The winner of each game was determined by the first team to reach 60-points, such that when they reached 60 or more points they led by 2 points or more, half time occurs when one team reached 30 or more points. If a team reaches 60 or more points without leading by 2, the game enters "overtime" and continues until one team leads the other by 2 or more points. During this week, the inaugural game went to overtime.

Game 1	Ghost Ballers	60–62	3 Headed Monsters
Game 2	Tri-State	58–62	Power
Game 3	3's Company	61–51	Ball Hogs
Game 4	Killer 3's	45–60	Trilogy

=== Week 2 (Charlotte, NC) ===
The second week of games in the Big3 Basketball League took place at the Spectrum Center, in Charlotte, North Carolina. The winner of each game was determined by the first team to reach 50-points, such that when they score 50 or more points and they lead by 2 points. Half time occurs when one team reached 25 or more points. The 50-point goal has been kept in place after the 60-point goal made the games a little too lengthy.

Game 1	Ball Hogs	50–44	Tri-State
Game 2	Trilogy	50–37	3 Headed Monsters
Game 3	Power	50–45	Killer 3's
Game 4	3's Company	45–50	Ghost Ballers

=== Week 3 (Tulsa, OK) ===
The third week of games in the Big3 Basketball League took place at the BOK Center, in Tulsa, Oklahoma.

Game 1	Power	32–50	3 Headed Monsters
Game 2	Killer 3's	51–44	Tri-State
Game 3	Ball Hogs	45–50	Ghost Ballers
Game 4	Trilogy	50–42	3's Company

=== Week 4 (Philadelphia, PA) ===
The fourth week of games in the Big3 Basketball League took place at the Wells Fargo Center, in Philadelphia, Pennsylvania.

Game 1	Ghost Ballers	44–51	Power
Game 2	Trilogy	50–43	Ball Hogs
Game 3	Killer 3's	46–51	3 Headed Monsters
Game 4	3's Company	44–51	Tri-State

=== Week 5 (Chicago, IL) ===
The fifth week of games in the Big3 Basketball League took place at the UIC Pavilion, in Chicago, Illinois. Trilogy clinched a playoff berth with a win over Tri-State.

Game 1	Ball Hogs	34–51	Power
Game 2	Tri-State	34–51	Trilogy
Game 3	3's Company	32–51	3 Headed Monsters
Game 4	Killer 3's	46–50	Ghost Ballers

=== Week 6 (Dallas, TX) ===
The sixth week of games in the Big3 Basketball League took place at the American Airlines Center, in Dallas, Texas. 3 Headed Monsters clinched a playoff berth with a win over Tri-State.

Game 1	Killer 3's	50–40	Ball Hogs
Game 2	Tri-State	45–50	3 Headed Monsters
Game 3	Trilogy	51–36	Ghost Ballers
Game 4	3's Company	53–49	Power

=== Week 7 (Lexington, KY) ===
The seventh week of games in the Big3 Basketball League took place at Rupp Arena, in Lexington, Kentucky.

Game 1	Ball Hogs	34–50	3 Headed Monsters
Game 2	Killer 3's	48–51	3's Company
Game 3	Trilogy	50–45	Power
Game 4	Tri-State	51–43	Ghost Ballers

=== Week 8 (Los Angeles, CA) ===
In a repeat of the first weeks games, the eighth and final week of games in the Big3 Basketball League took place at the Staples Center, in Los Angeles, California. The Ghost Ballers and Power clinch playoff berths as the last two in, eliminating 3's Company due to a loss to the Ball Hogs.

Game 1	Tri-State	51–42	Power
Game 2	Killer 3's	41-50	Trilogy
Game 3	3's Company	47–50	Ball Hogs
Game 4	Ghost Ballers	50–33	3 Headed Monsters

=== Standings ===
#	Team	W	L	Pct.	PF	PA	GP
1	YZ Trilogy	8	0	1.000	412	323	8
2	Y 3 Headed Monsters	6	2	.750	384	349	8
3	Y Power	4	4	.500	382	385	8
4	Y Ghost Ballers	4	4	.500	383	384	8
5	3's Company	3	5	.375	375	400	8
6	Tri-State	3	5	.375	378	393	8
7	Ball Hogs	2	6	.250	347	403	8
8	Killer 3's	2	6	.250	372	396	8

Notes

- Z clinched top seed
- Y clinched playoff spot

== Playoffs ==
=== Week 9 (Seattle, WA) ===
The first post-season games took place in Key Arena, in Seattle, Washington. 3 Headed Monsters, Power, Trilogy and Ghost Ballers competed in two semifinal playoff matchups, to determine who would advance to the championship game.. The Killer 3's, Ball Hogs, 3's Company, and Tri-State played in two games which determined the lower positions, but did not officially count in the standings.

Game 1	Killer 3's	46–52	Ball Hogs
Game 2	3's Company	51–48	Tri-State
Game 3 (Semifinal)	3 Headed Monsters	50–46	Power
Game 4 (Semifinal)	Trilogy	50–39	Ghost Ballers

=== Week 10 (Las Vegas, NV) ===
The league's inaugural championship game was hosted at MGM Grand Garden Arena in Las Vegas, Nevada. A consolation game was also played between the two teams eliminated in the previous week's semifinals.

Game 1 (consolation)	Power	39–52	Ghost Ballers
Game 2 (Championship)	Trilogy	51–46	3 Headed Monsters

=== Bracket ===
Semifinals; Key Arena, Seattle, WA
1	Trilogy	50
4	Ghost Ballers	39
2	3 Headed Monsters	50
3	Power	46

Championship; MGM Grand Garden Arena, Las Vegas, NV
1	Trilogy	51
2	3 Headed Monsters	46
3rd Place
3	Power	39
4	Ghost Ballers	52

== Individual statistic leaders ==
Category	Player	Team	Statistic
Points per game	Stephen Jackson	Killer 3's	21.6
Rebounds per game	Reggie Evans	Killer 3's	10.1
Steals per game	Andre Owens	3's Company	1.0
Blocks per game	Dermarr Johnson	3's Company	0.8
FG%	Kwame Brown	3 Headed Monsters	63%

== Awards ==
The league's players voted for the inaugural BIG3 awards, which were announced prior to the championship game.

- Most Valuable Player: Rashard Lewis (3 Headed Monsters)
- Coach of the Year: Rick Mahorn (Trilogy)
- Player Captain of the Year: Kenyon Martin (Trilogy)
- Defensive Player of the Year: James White (Trilogy)
- 4th Man: Al Thornton (3’s Company)
- Too Hard to Guard: Al Harrington (Trilogy)
- Best Trash Talker: Stephen Jackson (Killer 3s)
- Best Dressed: Cuttino Mobley (Power)

== Allen Iverson controversy ==
Allen Iverson's return was highly publicized when Big3 came to Philadelphia. Before the game, Iverson said, "I'm not going to go out there and be the 25-year-old Allen Iverson—you're going to see a 42-year-old man out there, but to be able to do that, for my fans, I thought that would be cool, just to get back out there again [...] for my fans to get that flashback." However, hours before the game, it was announced Iverson would not be playing. Iverson claimed that he did not play due to "advice from my doctor." Iverson's decision was frowned upon by many in the Philadelphia community.

On Sunday, July 30, the Big3 was scheduled to have games being played in Dallas, Texas. Iverson was slated to appear for his team, 3's Company, but failed to show up to the event or notify league officials about his decision. The next day, TMZ Sports posted pictures showing Iverson at a Chicago Area casino on the morning of the scheduled game.
