= Cuttino Mobley =

American basketball player (born 1975)

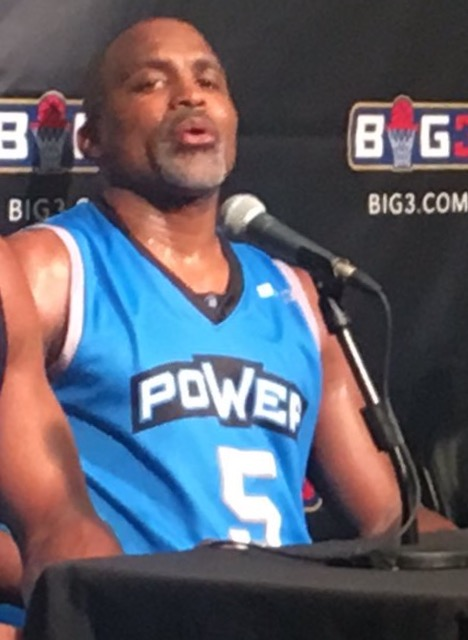
- Mobley in 2017

Personal information
- Born: September 1, 1975 (age 51) Philadelphia, Pennsylvania, U.S.
- Listed height: 6 ft 4 in (1.93 m)
- Listed weight: 215 lb (98 kg)

Career information
- High school: Cardinal Dougherty (Philadelphia, Pennsylvania); Maine Central Institute (Pittsfield, Maine)
- College: Rhode Island (1994–1998)
- NBA draft: 1998: 2nd round, 41st overall pick
- Drafted by: Houston Rockets
- Playing career: 1998–2008
- Position: Shooting guard
- Number: 5, 3

Career history
- 1998–2004: Houston Rockets
- 2004–2005: Orlando Magic
- 2005: Sacramento Kings
- 2005–2008: Los Angeles Clippers

Career highlights
- NBA All-Rookie Second Team (1999); Atlantic 10 Player of the Year (1998); First-team All-Atlantic 10 (1998)

Career NBA statistics
- Points: 11,964 (16.0 ppg)
- Rebounds: 2,902 (3.9 rpg)
- Assists: 2,015 (2.7 apg)
- Stats at NBA.com
- Stats at Basketball Reference

Cuttino Rashawn Mobley (born September 1, 1975) is an American former professional basketball player who played in the National Basketball Association from 1998 to 2008. He played college basketball for the Rhode Island Rams, earning conference player of the year honors in the Atlantic 10 in 1998. Mobley was selected in the second round of the 1998 NBA draft by the Houston Rockets and was named to the NBA All-Rookie Second Team. He has played in the 3x3 basketball in the Big3.

== Early life and college career ==
Cuttino, also known as the "Cat", attended Incarnation of Our Lord grade school in the Feltonville section of Philadelphia. After graduating from grade school, Mobley attended Cardinal Dougherty High School, transferred to Maine Central Institute in 1992, and graduated in 1993.

After high school, he attended the University of Rhode Island from 1993 to 1998 and redshirted his first year. At Rhode Island, he helped lead the Rams team to an Elite Eight appearance in the 1998 NCAA Men's Division I Basketball Tournament and graduated with a degree in communication studies.

== Professional career ==
=== Houston Rockets (1998–2004) ===
He was selected in the second round (41st overall) of the 1998 NBA draft by the Houston Rockets. Mobley started at the shooting guard position, where he and Steve Francis formed one of the NBA's elite scoring backcourts. Mobley played with them for six seasons before getting traded in 2004.

=== Orlando Magic (2004–2005) ===
Cuttino Mobley was traded to the Orlando Magic along with Steve Francis and Kelvin Cato for Tracy McGrady, Juwan Howard, Reece Gaines, and Tyronn Lue in the 2004 offseason. He only played 23 games with the Magic.

=== Sacramento Kings (2005) ===
Mobley was traded to the Sacramento Kings, along with Michael Bradley for Doug Christie. Mobley ranked third in the league in three-point percentage during the 2004–2005 season.

=== Los Angeles Clippers (2005–2008) ===
Mobley signed a five-year US$42 million deal with the Clippers on July 14, 2005. Besides being known for his three-point shooting, he also relied heavily on his post-up game. In addition, he also ran the Clutch City shootout contest in Houston during his Rockets years. Mobley, along with Sam Cassell and Elton Brand, led the Clippers to the 2006 NBA playoffs.

On January 28, 2005, Mobley's home was burglarized. Thieves stole $500,000 in cash, jewelry, and other items from Mobley's Bel-Air, California home.

On November 21, 2008, Mobley and Tim Thomas were traded to the New York Knicks for Zach Randolph and Mardy Collins. Mobley averaged 13.9 points per game as a member of the Clippers. This deal was delayed, for during Mobley's physical, the Knicks discovered he had a heart condition. Because the Knicks initially made the deal for salary cap reasons, they decided to finalize the deal regardless. However, on November 28, 2008, it was reported that the heart condition "may be career-ending."

=== Power (2017–2024) ===
In 2017, Mobley became the co-captain of Power in the BIG3; a 3-on-3 concept professional basketball league featuring former NBA players and prospects.

At the end of the 2017 inaugural season Mobley received the Best Dressed Award.

Coached by hall-of-famer Nancy Lieberman, Mobley and his team became the 2018 BIG3 champions when they defeated 3's Company.

In 2021, after Corey Maggette's retirement, Mobley took over the role of team captain.

As of the start of the BIG3 2022 season, Mobley is still a member of Power and is their current team captain.

== Retirement ==
On December 10, 2008, Mobley announced his retirement due to hypertrophic cardiomyopathy that was disclosed in a physical exam. This is the same heart illness suffered by Reggie Lewis, who died in 1993, and Hank Gathers, who died in 1990. Although he retired as a Knick, Mobley did not play a game for the team before retiring.

On April 5, 2010, the New York Knicks announced Mobley's formal release after the league approved their request for luxury tax relief.

== Personal life ==
Mobley is the cousin of former NFL linebacker John Mobley, and the fourth cousin of Michelle Obama.

In 2008, Mobley was named the recipient of the Philadelphia Sports Writers Association "Native Son" Award.

In 2023, Mobley periodically works for Fox Sports as a sports analyst.

== NBA career statistics ==
Legend
| GP | Games played | GS | Games started | MPG | Minutes per game |
| FG% | Field goal percentage | 3P% | 3-point field goal percentage | FT% | Free throw percentage |
| RPG | Rebounds per game | APG | Assists per game | SPG | Steals per game |
| BPG | Blocks per game | PPG | Points per game | **Bold** | Career high |

=== Regular season ===
| Year | Team | GP | GS | MPG | FG% | 3P% | FT% | RPG | APG | SPG | BPG | PPG |
|---|---|---|---|---|---|---|---|---|---|---|---|---|
| 1998–99 | Houston | 49 | 37 | 29.7 | .425 | .358 | .818 | 2.3 | 2.5 | .9 | **.5** | 9.9 |
| 1999–00 | Houston | **81** | 8 | 30.8 | .430 | .356 | .847 | 3.6 | 2.6 | 1.1 | .4 | 15.8 |
| 2000–01 | Houston | 79 | 49 | 38.0 | .434 | .357 | .831 | **5.0** | 2.5 | 1.1 | .3 | 19.5 |
| 2001–02 | Houston | 74 | 74 | **42.1** | .438 | .395 | .850 | 4.1 | 2.5 | **1.5** | **.5** | **21.7** |
| 2002–03 | Houston | 73 | 73 | 41.7 | .434 | .352 | **.858** | 4.2 | 2.8 | 1.3 | **.5** | 17.5 |
| 2003–04 | Houston | 80 | **80** | 40.4 | .426 | .390 | .811 | 4.5 | 3.2 | 1.3 | .4 | 15.8 |
| 2004–05 | Orlando | 23 | 21 | 31.6 | .432 | **.464** | .797 | 2.7 | 1.8 | 1.0 | .4 | 16.0 |
| 2004–05 | Sacramento | 43 | 43 | 38.7 | **.440** | .424 | .831 | 3.9 | **3.4** | 1.2 | **.5** | 17.8 |
| 2005–06 | L.A. Clippers | 79 | 74 | 37.7 | .426 | .339 | .839 | 4.3 | 3.0 | 1.2 | **.5** | 14.8 |
| 2006–07 | L.A. Clippers | 78 | 73 | 36.4 | **.440** | .411 | .837 | 3.4 | 2.5 | 1.2 | .3 | 13.8 |
| 2007–08 | L.A. Clippers | 77 | 38 | 35.1 | .433 | .349 | .819 | 3.6 | 2.6 | 1.0 | .4 | 12.8 |
| 2008–09 | L.A. Clippers | 11 | 11 | 33.2 | .432 | .343 | .722 | 2.6 | 1.1 | 1.4 | .2 | 13.7 |
| Career | | 747 | 581 | 37.0 | .433 | .378 | .835 | 3.9 | 2.7 | 1.2 | .4 | 16.0 |

=== Playoffs ===
| Year | Team | GP | GS | MPG | FG% | 3P% | FT% | RPG | APG | SPG | BPG | PPG |
|---|---|---|---|---|---|---|---|---|---|---|---|---|
| 1999 | Houston | 4 | 4 | 23.5 | **.467** | **.571** | **.909** | 1.0 | **2.8** | .5 | .0 | 7.0 |
| 2004 | Houston | 5 | 5 | **42.0** | .387 | .286 | .800 | **4.8** | **2.8** | .6 | **.6** | 14.4 |
| 2005 | Sacramento | 5 | 5 | 31.8 | .443 | .280 | .714 | 2.8 | 1.8 | **1.2** | .4 | **14.8** |
| 2006 | L.A. Clippers | **12** | **12** | 39.4 | .427 | .367 | .897 | **4.8** | 2.0 | .7 | .3 | 13.3 |
| Career | | 26 | 26 | 36.0 | .422 | .337 | .860 | 3.8 | 2.2 | .7 | .3 | 12.8 |
