= 2018 Big3 season =

2018 BIG3 season
- League: BIG3
- Sport: 3x3 basketball
- Duration: June 22, 2018– August 10, 2018; August 17, 2018 (playoffs); August 24, 2018 (championship)
- Games: 32 (regular season)
- Teams: 8
- Average attendance: 14,000
- TV partner(s): Fox, FS1, Facebook Live

Draft
- Top draft pick: Andre Owens
- Picked by: Ball Hogs

Regular season
- Season champions: Power
- Runners-up: 3's Company
- Season MVP: Corey Maggette

Playoffs
- Champions: Power
- Runners-up: 3's Company

Seasons
- ← 2017 2019 →

The 2018 BIG3 season was the second season of BIG3. The regular season began on June 22, 2018 and ended on August 10, 2018.

Prior to this season, BIG3 signed a streaming deal with Facebook.

== Venues ==
Week	Date(s)	Venue	City	Notes
1	June 22, 2018	Toyota Center	Houston, Texas	
2	June 29, 2018	United Center	Chicago, Illinois	
3	July 6, 2018	Oracle Arena	Oakland, California	
4	July 13, 2018	Little Caesars Arena	Detroit, Michigan	
5	July 20, 2018	American Airlines Arena	Miami, Florida	
6	July 27, 2018	Scotiabank Arena	Toronto, Ontario	
7	August 3, 2018	TD Garden	Boston, Massachusetts	
8	August 10, 2018	Infinite Energy Arena	Duluth, Georgia	
9	August 17, 2018	American Airlines Center	Dallas, Texas	Playoffs
10	August 24, 2018	Barclays Center	Brooklyn, New York	Championship game

== Draft ==
The draft lottery was held on April 3, 2018 in Los Angeles. The Ball Hogs came up with the winning ping pong ball and landed the first overall pick.

BIG3 co-founder Ice Cube and commissioner Clyde Drexler joined Skip Bayless, Shannon Sharpe and Joy Taylor on Fox Sports 1’s Skip and Shannon: Undisputed to make the announcement.

The 2018 BIG3 draft was held in Los Angeles on April 12, 2018. 19 players were selected across three rounds.

=== Player selections ===
Round	Pick	Player	Team	NBA experience	Last team	Last played
1	1	Andre Owens	Ball Hogs	2 years	(Austria) BC Zepter Vienna	2015
1	2	Andre Emmett	3's Company	2 years	(South Korea) Jeonju KCC Egis	2019
1	3	Alan Anderson	Killer 3's	8 years	(United States) Lakeland Magic	Active
1	4	Chris Andersen	Power	15 years	(United States) Cleveland Cavaliers	2017
1	5	David Hawkins	Tri-State	none	(Turkey) Galatasaray	2013
1	6	Lee Nailon	Ghost Ballers	6 years	(Mexico) Panteras de Aguascalientes	2014
2	7	Corsley Edwards	Ball Hogs	1 year	(Turkey) İstanbul Teknik Üniversitesi B.K.	2014
2	8	Jason Maxiell	3's Company	10 years	(United States) Detroit Pistons	2017
2	9	Ryan Hollins	Killer 3's	10 years	(Italy) Auxilium Pallacanestro Torino	2017
2	10	Quentin Richardson	Power	13 years	(United States) New York Knicks	2013
2	11	Salim Stoudamire	3 Headed Monsters	3 years	(Venezuela) Guaros de Lara	2013
2	12	Robert Hite	Tri-State	1 year	(United States) Canton Charge	2013
2	13	Marcus Banks	Ghost Ballers	8 years	(Qatar) Al-Gharafa SC	2016
3	14	Jermaine Taylor	Ball Hogs	2 years	(United States) Salt Lake City Stars	2018
3	15	Derrick Byars	3's Company	1 year	(United States) Delaware 87ers	2017
3	16	Mike James	Killer 3's	12 years	(United States) Texas Legends	2015
3	17	Ryan Gomes	Power	8 years	(United States) Los Angeles D-Fenders	2016
3	18	Bonzi Wells	Tri-State	10 years	(Puerto Rico) Capitanes de Arecibo	2010
3	19	Mario West	Ghost Ballers	4 years	(Argentina) Juventud Sionista	2015

Notes
Last team does not only refer to NBA teams, it also refers to overseas play such as the EuroLeague, NBL or any other major international league.
Last played refers to last year of being active in any basketball league.

== Regular season ==
=== Week 1 (Houston, TX) ===
The first week of games in the BIG3 Basketball League took place at the Toyota Center, in Houston, Texas.

Game 1	3 Headed Monsters	50–48	Ghost Ballers
Game 2	3's Company	51–30	Killer 3's
Game 3	Ball Hogs	31–51	Power
Game 4	Tri-State	51–34	Trilogy

=== Week 2 (Chicago, IL) ===
The second week of games in the BIG3 Basketball League took place at the United Center, in Chicago, Illinois.

Game 1	Killer 3's	50–44	Ghost Ballers
Game 2	Tri-State	51–34	Ball Hogs
Game 3	3's Company	44–50	Power
Game 4	3 Headed Monsters	50–34	Trilogy

=== Week 3 (Oakland, CA) ===
The third week of games in the BIG3 Basketball League took place at the Oracle Arena, in Oakland, California.

Game 1	3's Company	52–50	Trilogy
Game 2	Ball Hogs	50–40	Ghost Ballers
Game 3	Tri-State	50–46	Power
Game 4	3 Headed Monsters	51–49	Killer 3's

=== Week 4 (Detroit, MI) ===
The fourth week of games in the BIG3 Basketball League took place at the Little Caesars Arena, in Detroit, Michigan.

Game 1	Killer 3's	39–52	Trilogy
Game 2	3's Company	50–40	Ball Hogs
Game 3	Tri-State	48–50	3 Headed Monsters
Game 4	Power	50–45	Ghost Ballers

=== Week 5 (Miami, FL) ===
The fifth week of games in the BIG3 Basketball League took place at the American Airlines Arena, in Miami, Florida.

Game 1	Ghost Ballers	40–51	Tri-State
Game 2	Ball Hogs	38–50	Killer 3's
Game 3	Trilogy	48–51	Power
Game 4	3's Company	47–50	3 Headed Monsters

=== Week 6 (Toronto, ON) ===
The sixth week of games in the BIG3 Basketball League took place at the Scotiabank Arena, in Toronto, Ontario.

Game 1	3 Headed Monsters	51–45	Ball Hogs
Game 2	Power	50–28	Killer 3's
Game 3	3's Company	51–29	Tri-State
Game 4	Trilogy	41–50	Ghost Ballers

=== Week 7 (Boston, MA) ===
The seventh week of games in the BIG3 Basketball League took place at the TD Garden, in Boston, Massachusetts.

Game 1	Ball Hogs	45–51	Trilogy
Game 2	Tri-State	51–45	Killer 3's
Game 3	Power	51–40	3 Headed Monsters
Game 4	Ghost Ballers	33–51	3's Company

=== Week 8 (Duluth, GA) ===
The eighth week of games in the BIG3 Basketball League took place at Infinite Energy Arena in the Atlanta suburb of Duluth, Georgia.

Game 1	Killer 3's	51–44	3's Company
Game 2	3 Headed Monsters	51–37	Ghost Ballers
Game 3	Tri-State	40–50	Trilogy
Game 4	Power	50–40	Ball Hogs

=== Standings ===
#	Team	W	L	Pct.	PF	PA	GP
1	YZ Power	7	1	.875	399.2	326.4	8
2	Y 3 Headed Monsters	7	1	.875	392.8	359.2	8
3	Y 3's Company	5	3	.625	390.4	332.8	8
4	Y Tri-State	5	3	.625	371.2	350.4	8
5	Killer 3's	3	5	.375	342.4	380.8	8
6	Trilogy	3	5	.375	360	378.4	8
7	Ball Hogs	1	7	.125	323.2	394.4	8
8	Ghost Ballers	1	7	.125	336.8	394.4	8

Notes

- Z clinched top seed
- Y clinched playoff spot

== Playoffs ==
=== Week 9 (Dallas, TX) ===
The semifinals and bonus week of games in the BIG3 Basketball League took place at the American Airlines Center, in Dallas, Texas. The Ball Hogs, Ghost Ballers, Killer 3's, and Trilogy played in two games to determine the lower positions, but did not officially count in the standings.

Game 1	Ball Hogs	50–35	Ghost Ballers
Game 2	Trilogy	47–51	Killer 3's
Game 3 (Semifinal)	Power	51–49	Tri-State
Game 4 (Semifinal)	3 Headed Monsters	28–50	3's Company

=== Week 10 (Brooklyn, NY) ===
The second BIG3 Championship game was played at the Barclays Center in Brooklyn, New York. Power defeated 3's Company for the title. 3 Headed Monsters beat Tri-State in the consolation game to finish in third place.

Game 1 (Consolation)	3 Headed Monsters	52–49	Tri-State
Game 2 (Championship)	Power	51–43	3's Company

=== Bracket ===
Semifinals; American Airlines Center, Dallas, TX
1	Power	51
4	Tri-State	49
2	3 Headed Monsters	28
3	3's Company	50

Championship; Barclays Center, Brooklyn, NY
1	Power	51
3	3's Company	43
3rd Place
2	3 Headed Monsters	52
4	Tri-State	49

== Individual statistic leaders ==
Category	Player	Team	Statistic
Points per game	Al Harrington	Trilogy	18.0
Rebounds per game	Reggie Evans	3 Headed Monsters	10.3
Assists per game	Mike Bibby	Ghost Ballers	3.4
Steals per game	Al Harrington	Trilogy	1.7
Blocks per game	Chris Andersen	Power	1.4
FG%	Jermaine O'Neal	Tri-State	62.1%
3FG%	Mike Bibby	Ghost Ballers	100%
4FG%	Andre Emmett	3's Company	100%

== Awards ==
The awards for the 2018 season were announced prior to the championship game.

- Most Valuable Player: Corey Maggette (Power)
- Coach of the Year: Nancy Lieberman (Power)
- Player Captain of the Year: Corey Maggette (Power)
- Defensive Player of the Year: Chris 'Birdman' Andersen (Power)
- 4th Man: Andre Emmett (3's Company)
- Too Hard to Guard: Al Harrington (Trilogy)
- Best Trash Talker: Gary Payton (3-Headed Monsters)
- BIG Community Award: Ricky Davis (Ghost Ballers)
