= Detroit Amps =

- Leagues: BIG3
- Founded: 8 July 2024; 2 years ago
- Arena: Little Caesars Arena
- Location: Detroit, Michigan, United States
- Team colors: Black, gold, white
- President: Keith J. Stone
- Head coach: Rick Mahorn
- Ownership: GameAbove Sports (Keith J, Stone, George Gervin, T. J. Lang and others)
- Website: big3.com/teams/detroit-amps/

The Detroit Amps are an American men's 3-on-3 basketball team based in Detroit, Michigan that plays in the BIG3.

The team was first announced on July 8, 2024, when strategic investment company GameAbove Sports had purchased a new BIG3 expansion team to begin play in Detroit for the 2025 season when the league would switch to a city-based model.

The name was first announced as the Detroit Amplifiers on March 26, 2025, but had been shortened to the Detroit Amps with the logo and color scheme announcement on April 16.

== Current roster ==
2025 Detroit Amps roster
Players

Pos.	No.	Player	Height	Weight	DOB	From
PG	-	Jeremy Pargo (C)	6 ft 2 in (1.88 m)	219 lb (99 kg)	1986-03-17	Gonzaga
PF	-	Darnell Jackson (CC)	6 ft 9 in (2.06 m)	253 lb (115 kg)	1985-11-07	Kansas
G/F	-	Joe Johnson (CC)	6 ft 7 in (2.01 m)	240 lb (109 kg)	1981-06-29	Arkansas
C/M	-	Shakur Juiston	6 ft 7 in (2.01 m)	225 lb (102 kg)	1996-03-31	Oregon
F	-	Ray Nixon	6 ft 7 in (2.01 m)	230 lb (104 kg)	1984-09-10	Wisconsin

Coaches
Head coach
- George Gervin

Legend
- (DP) Unsigned draft pick
- (FA) Free agent
- (S) Suspended
- (CC) Team co-captain
- Injured

Roster
Updated: 2025-06-30

== Head coaches ==
Years Active	Name	BIG3 Championships
2025	George Gervin	0
2025-present	Rick Mahorn	
