= Houston Rig Hands =

- Leagues: BIG3
- Founded: 3 July 2024; 2 years ago
- Capacity: Toyota Center
- Location: Houston, Texas, United States
- Team colors: Columbia blue, red, black, white
- Head coach: Calvin Murphy
- Ownership: Eric Mullins and Milton Carroll
- Website: big3.com/teams/houston-rig-hands/

The Houston Rig Hands are an American men's 3-on-3 basketball team based in Houston, Texas that plays in the BIG3.

The team was first announced on July 3, 2024, when energy executives Eric Mullins and Milton Carroll had purchased a new BIG3 expansion team to begin play in Houston for the 2025 season when the league would switch to a city-based model.

The Rig Hands name would be announced on March 26, 2025, the same day Calvin Murphy was announced as their first head coach.

== Current roster ==
2025 Houston Rig Hands roster
Players

Pos.	No.	Player	Height	Weight	DOB	From
SF	-	Corey Brewer (C)	6 ft 9 in (2.06 m)	188 lb (85 kg)	1986-03-05	Florida
C/M	-	Brandon Moss (CC)	6 ft 8 in (2.03 m)	216 lb (98 kg)	1994-03-05	LSU–Alexandria
G/F	-	Garlon Green (CC)	6 ft 7 in (2.01 m)	215 lb (98 kg)	1994-01-11	TCU
PF	-	Jaylen Johnson	6 ft 9 in (2.06 m)	230 lb (104 kg)	1996-08-07	Louisville
PF/C	-	Jeff Ayres	6 ft 10 in (2.08 m)	240 lb (109 kg)	1987-04-29	Arizona State

Coaches
Head coach
- Calvin Murphy

Legend
- (DP) Unsigned draft pick
- (FA) Free agent
- (S) Suspended
- (CC) Team co-captain
- Injured

Roster
Updated: 2025-06-30

== Head coaches ==
Years Active	Name	BIG3 Championships
2025-present	Calvin Murphy	
