= DeShawn Stevenson =

American basketball player (born 1981)

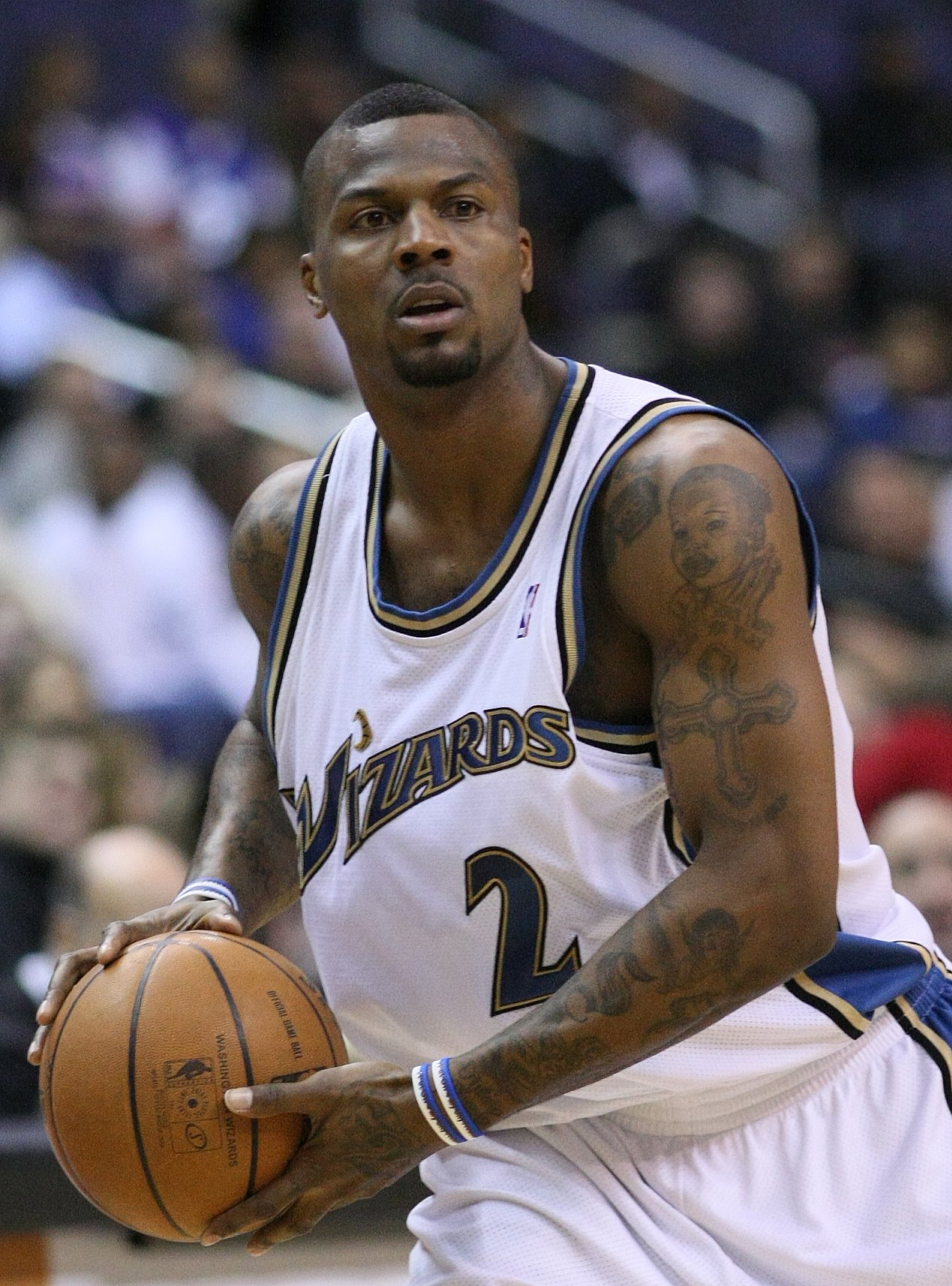
- Stevenson with the Washington Wizards in 2008

Personal information
- Born: April 3, 1981 (age 45) Fresno, California, U.S.
- Listed height: 6 ft 5 in (1.96 m)
- Listed weight: 218 lb (99 kg)

Career information
- High school: Washington Union (Easton, California)
- NBA draft: 2000: 1st round, 23rd overall pick
- Drafted by: Utah Jazz
- Playing career: 2000–2013
- Position: Shooting guard
- Number: 2, 9, 92

Career history
- 2000–2004: Utah Jazz
- 2004–2006: Orlando Magic
- 2006–2010: Washington Wizards
- 2010–2011: Dallas Mavericks
- 2011–2012: New Jersey Nets
- 2012–2013: Atlanta Hawks

Career highlights
- NBA champion (2011); First-team Parade All-American (2000); McDonald's All-American (2000)

Career NBA statistics
- Points: 5,930 (7.2 ppg)
- Rebounds: 1,832 (2.2 rpg)
- Assists: 1,355 (1.6 apg)
- Stats at NBA.com
- Stats at Basketball Reference

DeShawn Stevenson (born April 3, 1981) is an American former professional basketball player. Stevenson played for six teams in the National Basketball Association (NBA) during a 13-year career. He originally committed to play at the University of Kansas, but decided to enter the NBA directly from high school and was picked by the Utah Jazz with the 23rd selection of the 2000 NBA draft. He was a member of the Dallas Mavericks team that won an NBA championship in 2011. In 2017, Stevenson joined Power, one of the eight BIG3 basketball league teams.

== Early life ==
Stevenson was born in Fresno, California. His father, Darryl Stevenson, never married his mother Genice Popps, and eventually was forcibly placed in a facility after threatening family members and diagnosed as schizophrenic. Darryl signed a court order agreeing he had a duty to support his son, but eventually murdered his own mother Clara by strangling her; he died of cancer at the age of 36 in prison. DeShawn's name was tattooed on his chest. Due to the absence of his father, DeShawn lived with his godparents in Easton, California. He played high school ball at the same school where his father had played, and won a state championship his junior year.

Stevenson signed with the Kansas Jayhawks in the fall of his senior year. Jayhawks head coach Roy Williams called him his "most gifted recruit ever". As a senior, Stevenson averaged 30.4 points, 9.7 rebounds and 6.2 assists a game. He was named to the McDonald's All-American team and scored 25 points to lead the West to a 146–120 win, and won the slam-dunk contest. Stevenson's mother advised him not to go straight to the NBA, but after there were irregularities with his SAT test, because he claimed he didn't know any answers because his girlfriend allegedly did all his homework in high school, Stevenson did indeed enter the league straight out of high school.

== Professional career ==
=== Utah Jazz (2000–2004) ===
Stevenson was picked by the Utah Jazz with the 23rd selection of the 2000 NBA draft.

Stevenson appeared in 222 regular season games during his time with Utah. He averaged 5.9 ppg, 1.9 rpg, and 1.2 apg, in 16.7 mpg during that time. Stevenson played in five career playoff outings. At 19 years old, he became the youngest player to ever play and start for the Jazz during the 2000–01 season. In 2001, Stevenson finished second in the NBA Slam Dunk Contest. Later that year, Stevenson pleaded no contest to the offence of the criminal offence of having sex with a minor, being accused of having sex with a 14-year-old girl.

On March 16, 2003, Stevenson received widespread attention for shoving Ricky Davis of the Cleveland Cavaliers after Davis deliberately missed a shot on his own basket in an attempt to record a triple-double, when the Cavaliers were up 120–95. On November 1, 2003, Stevenson scored a then-career-high 24 points in a loss against the Mavericks.

On February 19, 2004, Stevenson and a future second round draft pick were acquired by the Orlando Magic from the Utah Jazz in exchange for guard–forward Gordan Giricek.

=== Orlando Magic (2004–2006) ===
Stevenson played with the Orlando Magic for 2½ seasons. He had his best year during the 2005–06 season when he averaged 11.0 ppg, 2.9 rpg, and 2.0 apg. Stevenson opted out of the third and final year of his contract with Orlando, and on August 5, 2006, he signed a two-year minimum contract with the Washington Wizards.

=== Washington Wizards (2006–2010) ===
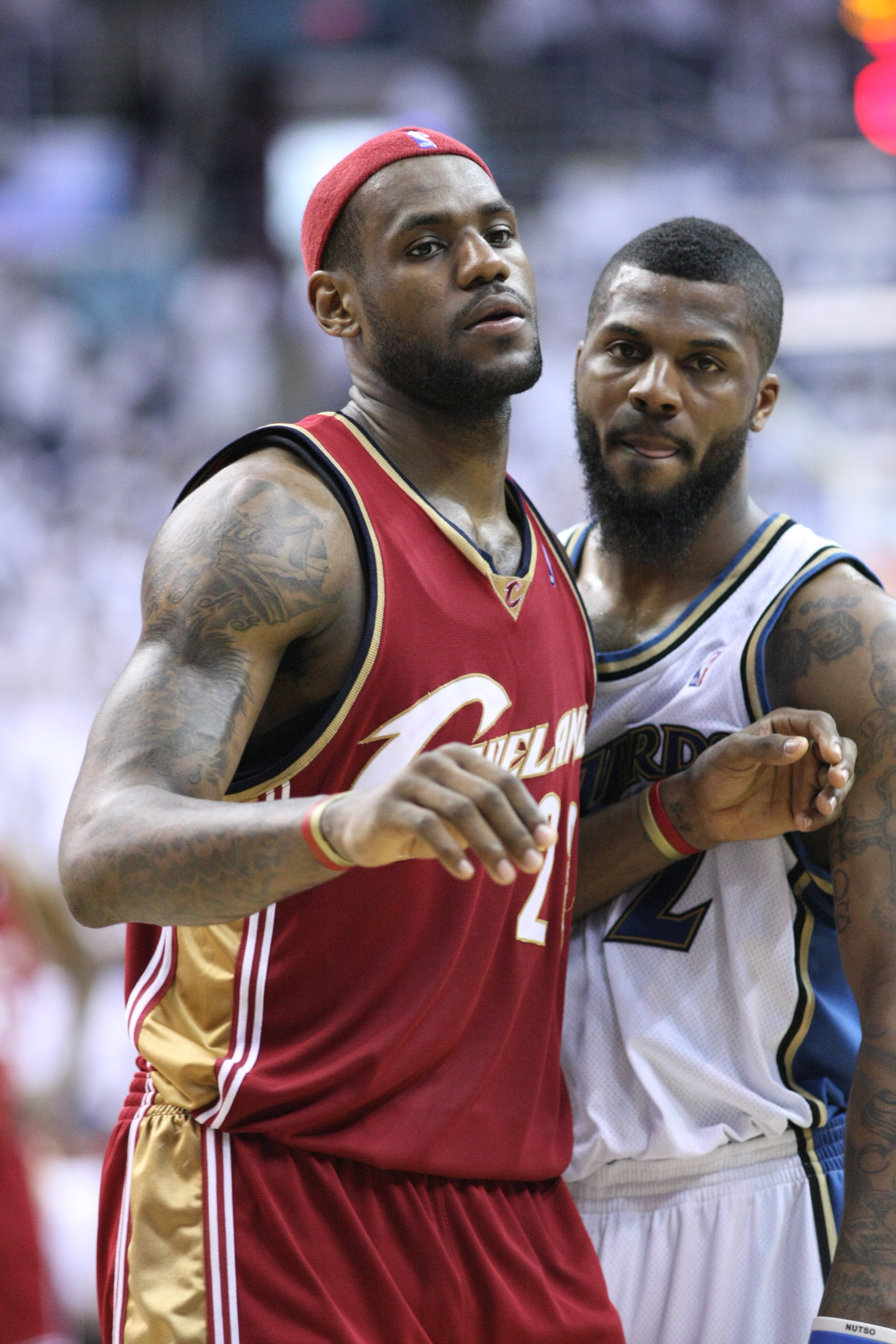
Stevenson and LeBron James in April 2008. The two had a short feud after Stevenson called James "overrated".

On August 5, 2006, Stevenson signed a two-year contract with the Washington Wizards for the NBA minimum salary. Stevenson quickly adjusted to coach Eddie Jordan's system, averaging 11.2 ppg, 2.7 rpg, and 2.7 apg in his first season with Washington. Following the 2006–07 season, he opted out of the second year of his contract to test free agency. On July 16, 2007, Stevenson re-signed with the Wizards on a four-year, $15 million deal.

On the early morning of August 20, 2007, a 31-year-old man, Curtis Ruff, was shot and injured at Stevenson's home, following an argument with women who were invited from Destiny's Club in Orlando. Circumstances of the incident remain unclear.

After Stevenson, with a sore knee, scored a career-high 33 points, including a game winning three-pointer as time expired in a February 25, 2008, victory over the New Orleans Hornets, Wizards coach Eddie Jordan described Stevenson by saying, "He's a warrior, man, a true warrior. His confidence is growing, he's making threes, he's just a true pro. This is a man's league and he is man. In the dictionary next to that word there is a picture of DeShawn Stevenson."

At the start of the 2008–09 season, Stevenson struggled and could not bring his offensive game to the level it had attained in 2007. As a result, Stevenson's minutes dipped slightly with the development of second year shooting guard Nick Young and former Maryland standout Juan Dixon.

=== Dallas Mavericks (2010–2011) ===
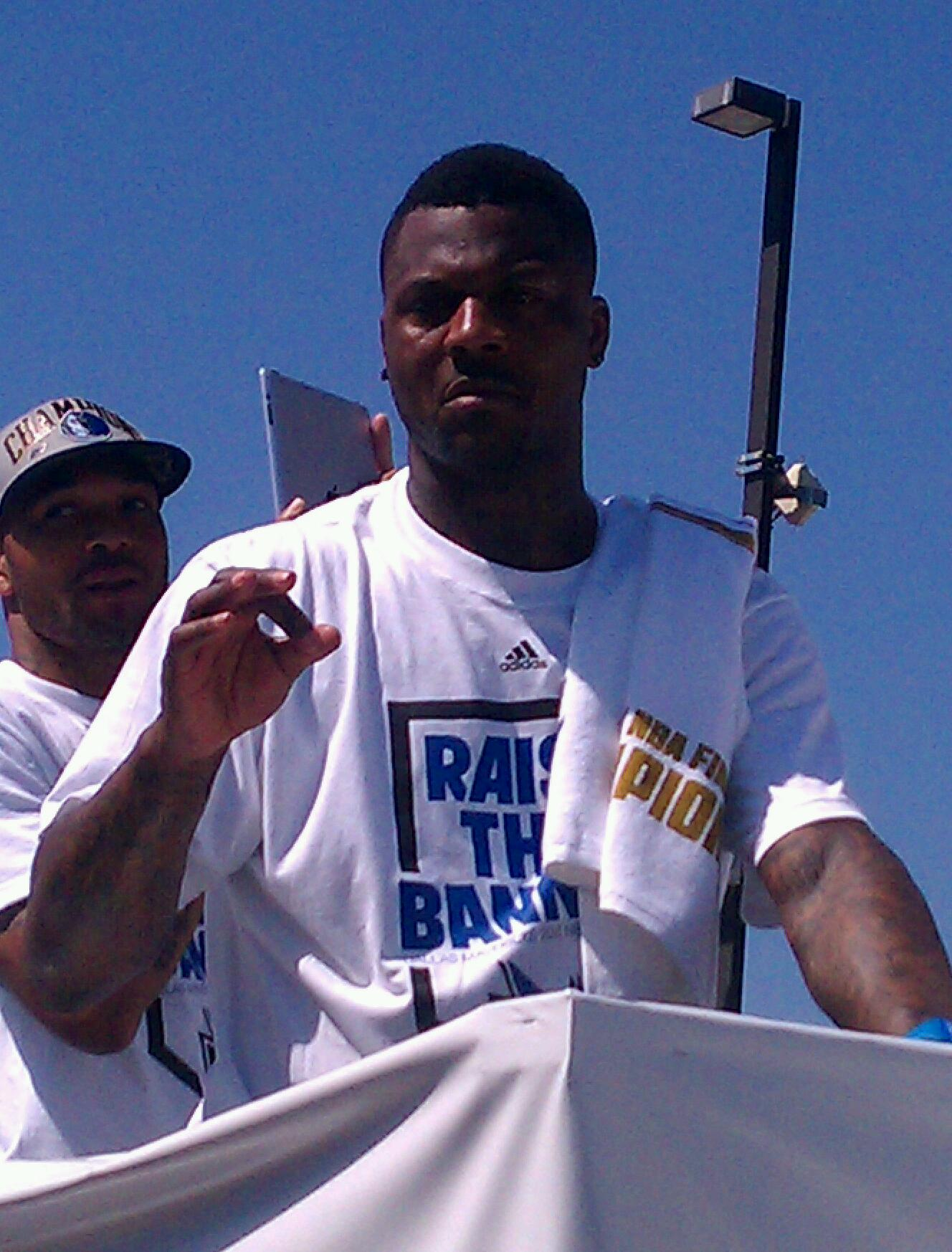
Stevenson at the Dallas Mavericks championship parade

On February 13, 2010, Stevenson was traded to the Dallas Mavericks along with Caron Butler and Brendan Haywood for Josh Howard, Drew Gooden, James Singleton and Quinton Ross. Stevenson became the first player in NBA history to wear number 92 on his jersey. Stevenson chose number 92 because he wore number 9 in Orlando and number 2 with Utah and Washington. He used his player option and made $4.15 million during the 2010–11 NBA season. On June 12, 2011, the Mavericks won the NBA championship, defeating the LeBron James-led Miami Heat 105–95 in Game 6 of the NBA Finals. In that game, Stevenson made three of five three-point shots, scoring nine points.

=== New Jersey Nets (2011–2012) ===
On December 23, 2011, Stevenson signed one-year $2.5 million contract with the New Jersey Nets.

=== Atlanta Hawks (2012–2013) ===
On July 11, 2012, the Nets traded Stevenson in a sign-and-trade, along with Jordan Farmar, Jordan Williams, Anthony Morrow, and Johan Petro, to the Atlanta Hawks for Joe Johnson. On August 2, 2013, he was waived by the Hawks.

Stevenson played his final game on May 1, 2013, during Game 5 of the Eastern Conference's 1st Round. The Hawks lost the game 83 - 106 with Stevenson only playing 16 seconds. Stevenson formally announced his retirement three and half years later on December 19, 2016.

== NBA career statistics ==
Legend
GP	Games played	GS	Games started	MPG	Minutes per game
FG%	Field goal percentage	3P%	3-point field goal percentage	FT%	Free throw percentage
RPG	Rebounds per game	APG	Assists per game	SPG	Steals per game
BPG	Blocks per game	PPG	Points per game	**Bold**	Career high
†	Won an NBA championship	*	Led the league

=== Regular season ===
Year	Team	GP	GS	MPG	FG%	3P%	FT%	RPG	APG	SPG	BPG	PPG
2000–01	Utah	40	2	7.3	.341	.083	.684	.7	.5	.3	.1	2.2
2001–02	Utah	67	23	16.9	.385	.080	.698	2.0	1.7	.4	**.4**	4.9
2002–03	Utah	61	8	12.5	.401	.333	.691	1.4	.7	.4	.1	4.6
2003–04	Utah	54	54	28.0	.445	.233	.669	3.3	1.7	.5	.3	**11.4**
2003–04	Orlando	26	24	**35.9**	.404	.293	.690	**4.6**	2.5	**.9**	.0	11.2
2004–05	Orlando	55	27	19.8	.408	.373	.554	1.9	1.3	.3	.2	7.8
2005–06	Orlando	**82***	**82***	32.3	.460	.133	.744	2.9	2.0	.7	.2	11.0
2006–07	Washington	**82***	**82***	29.5	**.461**	**.404**	.704	2.6	2.7	.8	.2	11.2
2007–08	Washington	**82***	**82***	31.3	.386	.383	**.797**	2.9	**3.1**	.8	.2	11.2
2008–09	Washington	32	25	27.7	.312	.271	.533	2.4	**3.1**	.7	.1	6.6
2009–10	Washington	40	13	15.4	.282	.177	.720	1.6	1.1	.3	.1	2.2
2009–10	Dallas	24	5	11.1	.283	.320	.700	1.1	.5	.2	.0	2.0
2010–11†	Dallas	72	54	16.1	.388	.378	.767	1.5	1.1	.3	.1	5.3
2011–12	New Jersey	51	30	18.8	.285	.283	.563	2.0	.8	.4	.1	2.9
2012–13	Atlanta	56	31	20.7	.374	.364	.522	2.2	.9	.5	.1	5.1
Career		824	542	22.3	.406	.340	.698	2.2	1.6	.5	.2	7.2

=== Playoffs ===
Year	Team	GP	GS	MPG	FG%	3P%	FT%	RPG	APG	SPG	BPG	PPG
2001	Utah	1	0	8.0	.500	.000	.000	1.0	.0	.0	.0	2.0
2003	Utah	4	0	9.3	.400	.000	**1.000**	1.8	1.0	.3	.0	4.5
2007	Washington	4	4	30.5	.196	.158	.429	**2.5**	1.8	.5	**.8**	6.0
2008	Washington	6	6	**32.7**	.367	.389	.889	2.2	**3.0**	**1.0**	.0	**12.3**
2010	Dallas	2	0	3.0	.000	.000	.000	.0	.0	.0	.0	.0
2011†	Dallas	**21**	**18**	15.8	.349	.397	.750	.9	.6	.5	.1	4.5
2013	Atlanta	4	0	11.3	**.600**	**.600**	.000	**2.5**	.3	.0	.0	2.3
Career		42	28	17.8	.327	.353	.791	1.4	1.0	.5	.1	5.3
