= T. J. Cline =

American-Israeli basketball player

T. J. Cline טי ג'יי קליין
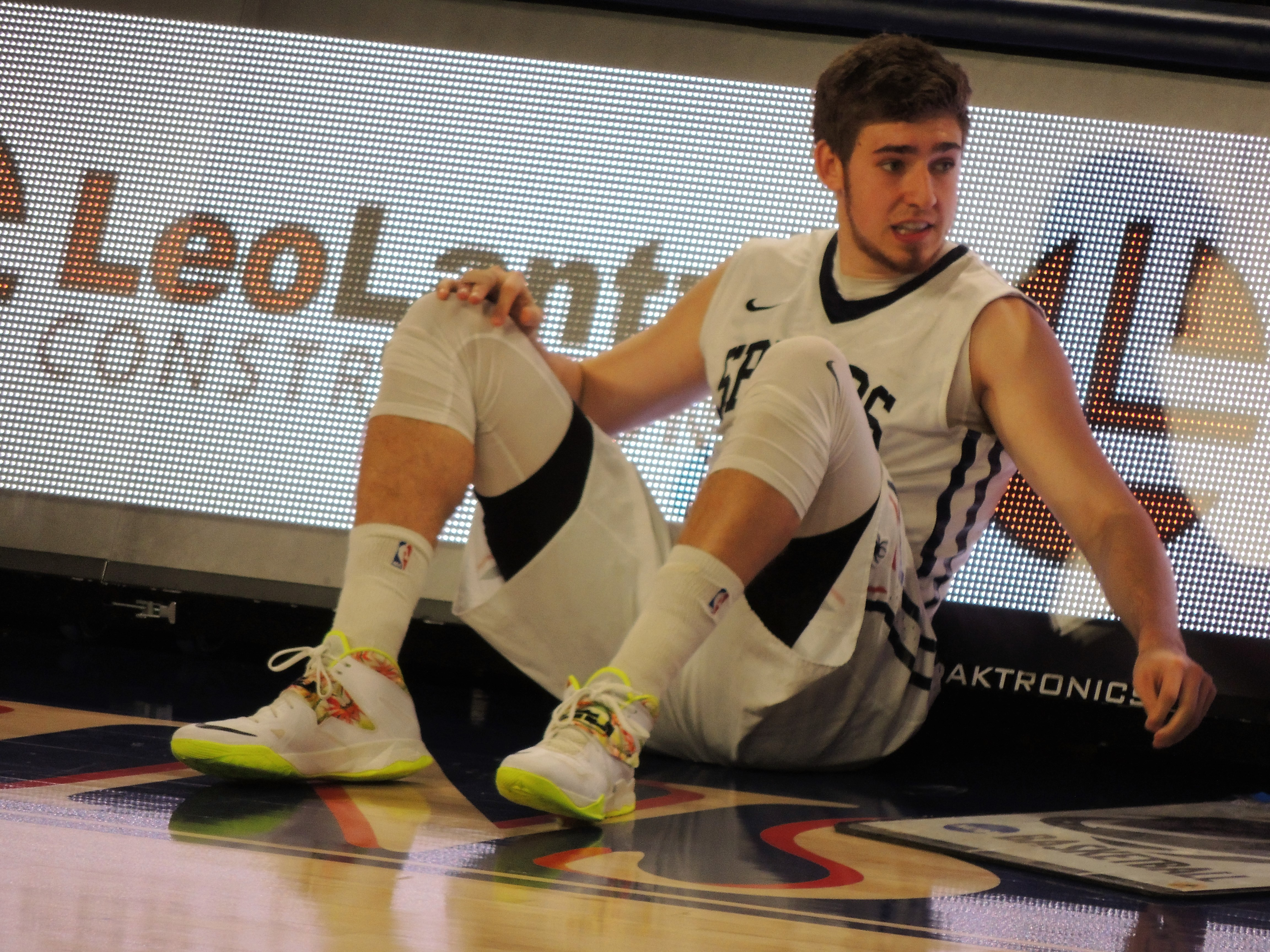
- Cline with Richmond, 2015

No. 6 – Dallas Power
- Position: Power forward / center
- League: BIG3

Personal information
- Born: July 22, 1994 (age 32) Plano, Texas, U.S.
- Listed height: 2.06 m (6 ft 9 in)
- Listed weight: 104 kg (229 lb)

Career information
- High school: Plano West (Plano, Texas)
- College: Niagara (2012–2013); Richmond (2014–2017)
- NBA draft: 2017: undrafted
- Playing career: 2017–present

Career history
- 2017: Galatasaray
- 2017–2020: Hapoel Holon
- 2020–2021: Basket Brescia Leonessa
- 2021: Maccabi Tel Aviv
- 2022: Capital City Go-Go
- 2022: MoraBanc Andorra
- 2023: Hapoel Jerusalem
- 2023–2024: Hapoel Eilat
- 2025–2026: Ironi Ness Ziona
- 2026–present: Dallas Power

Career highlights
- Israeli Cup winner (2018, 2023); AP Honorable Mention All-American (2017); Atlantic 10 Player of the Year (2017); First-team All-Atlantic 10 (2017); MAAC All-Rookie team (2013)

Timothy Joseph Cline (Hebrew: טימותי ג'וזף קליין; born July 22, 1994) is an American-Israeli professional basketball player for the Dallas Power of the BIG3 league. He played college basketball for the Richmond Spiders and the Niagara Purple Eagles. Cline is the son of Naismith Memorial Basketball Hall of Fame player Nancy Lieberman.

== College career ==
After playing three years of junior varsity basketball at Plano West Senior High School, Cline re-made his game (and grew four inches to 6'8") and starred his senior season, earning conference offensive player of the year honors. He was able to obtain an NCAA Division I scholarship to Niagara. As a freshman, he earned Metro Atlantic Athletic Conference all-rookie team. When coach Joe Mihalich left Niagara for Hofstra, Cline chose to transfer to the University of Richmond.

At Richmond, Cline built a reputation as a scorer. In his senior season, he averaged 18.6 points and 8.1 rebounds per game. A skilled passer, Cline averaged 5.6 assists per game, unusual for a player his size. In 2014–15 he was fourth in the Atlantic 10 Conference in 2-point field goal percentage (.605). In 2015–16 he was second in the A-10 in field goal percentage (.558) and 2-point field goal percentage (.635), and sixth in points per game (18.3). In 2016–17 he was second in the A-10 in 2-point field goal percentage (.613) and assists per game (5.6), third in field goal percentage (.517), and fifth in points per game (18.3).

At the close of the 2016–17 season, Cline became the second Spiders player to be named Atlantic 10 Player of the Year. Despite playing only three seasons at Richmond, Cline finished his career ranked eighth in points and seventh in assists in Spider history.

== Professional career ==
=== Galatasaray (2017) ===
On August 6, 2017, Cline signed with Turkish team Galatasaray for the 2017–18 season. He parted ways with Galatasaray on November 15 after seeing action in five games.

=== Hapoel Holon (2017–2020) ===
==== 2017–18 season ====
On November 15, 2017, Cline signed a two-year deal with Israeli team Hapoel Holon. On November 23, 2017, Cline received an Israeli passport. On February 15, 2018, Cline won the Israeli Cup with Holon after beating perennial cup holders Maccabi Tel Aviv, 86–84 in the final game of the competition. On March 4, 2018, Cline recorded a season-high 16 points, shooting 7-for-8 from the field, along with four rebounds and two assists in a 105–88 win over Maccabi Ashdod. Cline helped Holon reach the 2018 Israeli League Final, where they eventually lost to Maccabi Tel Aviv.

==== 2018–19 season ====
On July 2, 2018, Cline joined the Milwaukee Bucks for the 2018 NBA Summer League, where he averaged 3.2 points and 4 rebounds in 14 minutes per game.

On March 5, 2019, Cline recorded a career-high 19 points, shooting 8-of-12 from the field, along with four rebounds and two assists in an 85–81 win over Balkan. In 20 Israeli League games, he averaged 9.9 points, 5.6 rebounds and 2.9 assists per game. Cline helped Holon reach the 2019 FIBA Europe Cup semifinals, where they eventually were eliminated by Dinamo Sassari.

==== 2019–20 season ====
On July 16, 2019, Cline re-signed with Holon for the 2019–20 season. On October 5, 2019, Cline recorded an Israeli League career-high 18 points, shooting 7-of-12 from the field, along with eight rebounds and seven assists in an 89–75 win over Hapoel Tel Aviv. Two days later, he was named Israeli League Round 1 MVP. He was named to the Basketball Champions League Team of the Week on January 16, 2020, after contributing 18 points, 10 rebounds, and two assists in a win over SIG Strasbourg. He averaged 12.9 points, 6.4 rebounds and 3.1 assists per game in Winner League.

=== Basket Brescia Leonessa (2020–2021) ===
On July 22, 2020, the day of his birthday, Cline signed a one-year deal with Basket Brescia Leonessa in the Italian Lega Basket Serie A (LBA) and EuroCup Basketball.

=== Maccabi Tel Aviv (2021–2022) ===
On January 24, 2021, Cline signed a deal with Maccabi Tel Aviv of the Israeli Basketball Premier League and the Euroleague.

=== Capital City Go-Go (2022) ===
On January 21, 2022, Cline was acquired via waivers by the Capital City Go-Go of the NBA G League, where he averaged 10.4 points and 3.7 rebounds.

=== MoraBanc Andorra (2022) ===
On April 11, 2022, Cline signed with MoraBanc Andorra of the Liga ACB. He played 5 games for the team, starting one of them, and averaging 6.2 points, 2.6 rebounds, and 2.0 assists per game.

=== Hapoel Jerusalem (2023) ===
On January 27, 2023, he signed with Hapoel Jerusalem of the Israeli Basketball Premier League. He played 17 games for the team, starting nine of them, and averaging 5.5 points, 4.0 rebounds, and 1.2 assists per game.

=== Hapoel Eilat (2023–present) ===
On July 28, 2023, he signed with Hapoel Eilat of the Israeli Basketball Premier League.

== National team career ==
Cline is a member of the Israeli national basketball team. On February 21, 2019, Cline made his first appearance for the Israeli team in an 81–77 win over Germany, recording 14 points and five rebounds off the bench.

== Personal life ==
Cline was born in Plano, Texas, is Jewish, and is the son of Naismith Memorial Basketball Hall of Fame player Nancy Lieberman. During his childhood, however, his mother had already adopted Christianity, especially its born-again tradition, as detailed in a 1998 review of the book Faith in Sports: Athletes and Their Religion on and Off the Field by Steve Hubbard and a 2015 article in The Jerusalem Post.
