= Miami 305 =

- Leagues: BIG3
- Founded: 15 June 2024; 2 years ago
- Capacity: Kaseya Center
- Location: Miami, Florida, United States
- Team colors: Sea blue, pink, orange, yellow, black, white
- Head coach: Michael Cooper
- Ownership: Heath Freeman
- Championships: 1 (2025)
- Website: big3.com/teams/miami-305/

The Miami 305 are an American men's 3-on-3 basketball team based in Miami, Florida that plays in the BIG3.

The team was first announced on June 15, 2024, when businessman Heath Freeman had purchased a BIG3 expansion team to begin play in Miami for the 2025 season when the league would switch to a city-based model.

The 305 name would be announced on March 26, 2025, the same day Michael Cooper was announced as their first head coach.

== Current roster ==
2025 Miami 305 roster
Players

Pos.	No.	Player	Height	Weight	DOB	From
PG	15	Mario Chalmers (C)	6 ft 2 in (1.88 m)	190 lb (86 kg)	1986-05-19	Kansas
C/M	11	Michael Beasley (CC)	6 ft 9 in (2.06 m)	235 lb (107 kg)	1989-01-09	Kansas State
PF	30	Reggie Evans (CC)	6 ft 8 in (2.03 m)	245 lb (111 kg)	1980-05-18	Iowa
G/F	1	Lance Stephenson	6 ft 5 in (1.96 m)	210 lb (95 kg)	1990-09-05	Cincinnati
PF/C	51	Sean Williams	6 ft 9 in (2.06 m)	235 lb (107 kg)	1986-09-13	Boston College

Coaches
Head coach
- Michael Cooper

Legend
- (DP) Unsigned draft pick
- (FA) Free agent
- (S) Suspended
- (CC) Team co-captain
- Injured

Roster
Updated: 2025-06-30

== Head coaches ==
Years Active	Name	BIG3 Championships
2025-present	Michael Cooper	1
