= LA Riot =

Basketball team based in California, United States

- Leagues: BIG3
- Founded: 10 May 2024; 2 years ago
- Arena: Intuit Dome
- Location: Inglewood, California, United States
- Team colors: Black, gold, orange, red, white
- Head coach: Nick Young
- Ownership: Shawn Horwitz
- Website: lariot.com

The LA Riot are an American men's 3-on-3 basketball team based in Los Angeles, California that plays in the BIG3.

The team was first announced on May 10, 2024, when DCB Sports (led by Gary LaDrido) had purchased the first BIG3 expansion team to begin play in Los Angeles for the 2025 season when the league would switch to a city-based model. However, Palm Drive Associates CEO Shawn Horwitz would later be revealed as the team's owner; it is unknown whether Horwitz purchased the Riot from LaDrido and DCB or whether the franchise granted to him was a separate one from LaDrido's.

The Riot name would be announced on March 26, 2025, the same day Nick Young was announced as their first head coach.

== Current roster ==
2025 LA Riot roster
Players

Pos.	No.	Player	Height	Weight	DOB	From
PF/C	12	Dwight Howard (C)	6 ft 10 in (2.08 m)	265 lb (120 kg)	1985-12-06	Southwest Atlanta Christian Academy
SG	-	Jordan Crawford (CC)	6 ft 4 in (1.93 m)	195 lb (88 kg)	1988-10-22	Xavier
SF	-	Elijah Stewart (CC)	6 ft 5 in (1.96 m)	194 lb (88 kg)	1995-11-14	USC
G/F	-	Wesley Johnson	6 ft 7 in (2.01 m)	215 lb (98 kg)	1987-07-11	Syracuse
PG	-	Mike Taylor	6 ft 1 in (1.85 m)	188 lb (85 kg)	1986-01-21	Iowa State

Coaches
Head coach
- Nick Young

Legend
- (DP) Unsigned draft pick
- (FA) Free agent
- (S) Suspended
- (CC) Team co-captain
- Injured

Roster
Updated: 2025-06-30

== Head coaches ==
Years Active	Name	BIG3 Championships
2025-present	Nick Young	
