= Nancy Lieberman =

American basketball player (born 1958)

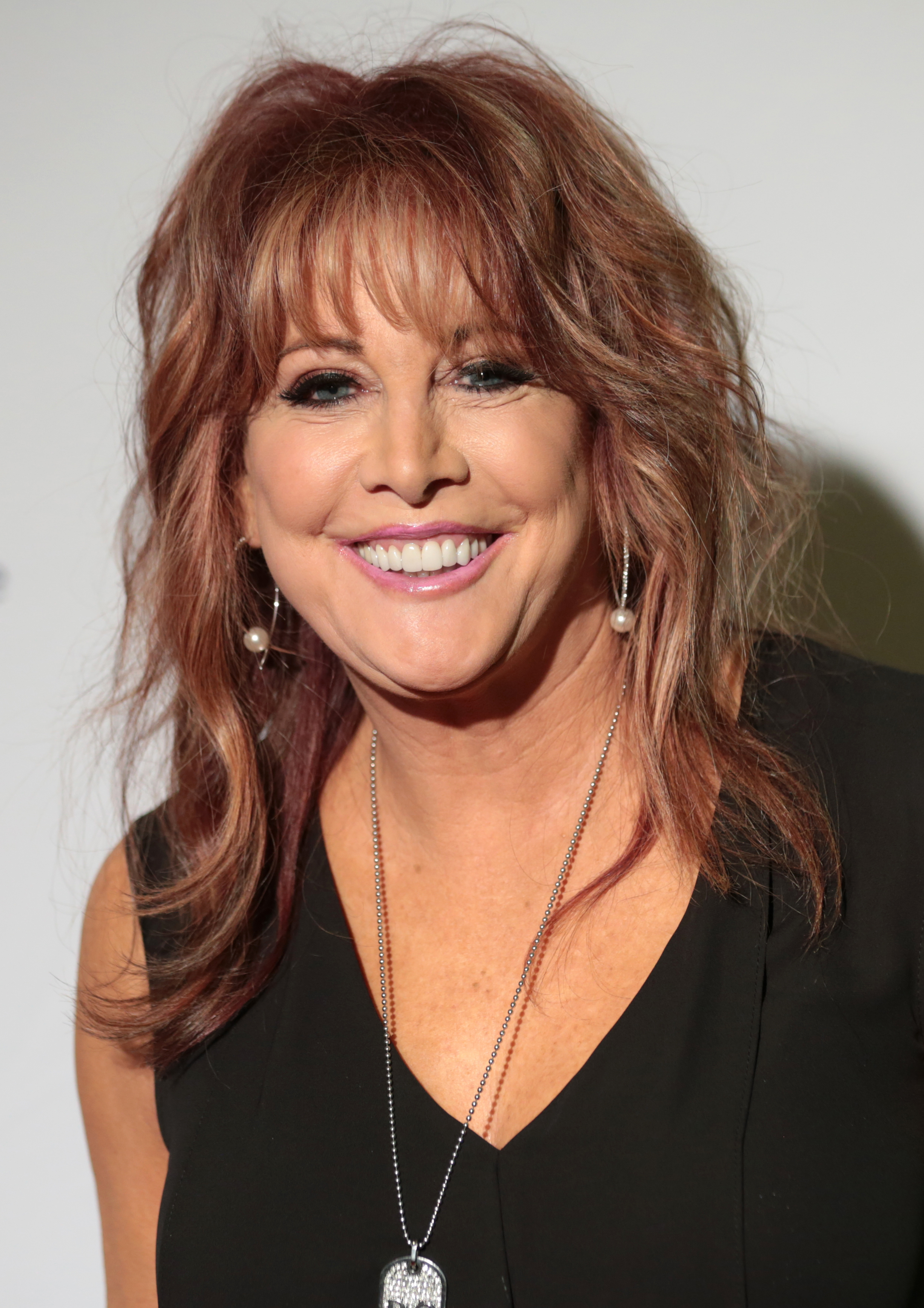
- Lieberman in 2018

Personal information
- Born: July 1, 1958 (age 68) Brooklyn, New York, U.S.
- Listed height: 5 ft 10 in (1.78 m)
- Listed weight: 175 lb (79 kg)

Career information
- High school: Far Rockaway (New York City, New York)
- College: Old Dominion (1976–1980)
- WNBA draft: 1997: 2 (Elite) round, 15th overall pick
- Drafted by: Phoenix Mercury
- Playing career: 1980–1987, 1997, 2008
- Position: Point guard
- Coaching career: 1998–2000, 2009–2011, 2015–present

Career history

Playing
- 1980–1981, 1984: Dallas Diamonds
- 1986: Springfield Fame
- 1987: Long Island Knights
- 1997: Phoenix Mercury
- 2008: Detroit Shock

Career highlights
- As player: WABA champion (1984); WABA Most Valuable Player (1984); WBL Rookie of the Year (1981); 3× Kodak All-American (1978–1980); 2× Honda Sports Award for basketball (1979, 1980); Honda-Broderick Cup for all sports (1979); 2× Wade Trophy (1979, 1980)
- Stats at Basketball Reference
- Basketball Hall of Fame
- Women's Basketball Hall of Fame
Medals
Women's Basketball
Representing the United States
Olympic Games
Silver medal – second place	1976 Montreal	Team competition
World Championship
Gold medal – first place	1979 Seoul	National team
Pan American Games
Gold medal – first place	1975 Mexico	Team competition
Silver medal – second place	1979 Puerto Rico	Team competition
Jones Cup
Gold medal – first place	1979 Taipei	Team competition

Nancy Ilizabeth Lieberman (born July 1, 1958), nicknamed "Lady Magic", is an American former professional basketball player and coach in the Women's National Basketball Association (WNBA), who is a broadcaster for the Oklahoma City Thunder of the National Basketball Association (NBA) as well as the head coach of Power, a team in the BIG3 which she led to its 2018 Championship. Lieberman is regarded as one of the greatest figures in American women's basketball.

In 2000, she was inducted into the Nassau County Sports Hall of Fame. Lieberman is a member of the Naismith Memorial Basketball Hall of Fame, the Women's Basketball Hall of Fame, the St. Louis Jewish Sports Hall of Fame, the Virginia Sports Hall of Fame, and the International Sports Hall of Fame.

== Early life ==
Lieberman was born in Brooklyn, New York, to Jerome and Renee Lieberman. She is Jewish (and described herself as "just a poor, skinny, redheaded Jewish girl from Queens"). Her family lived in Brooklyn when she was born, but soon moved to Far Rockaway, Queens, where she grew up with her older brother Clifford. She lost great-grandparents in the Holocaust, and her paternal grandparents, who survived, had concentration camp numbers on their wrists.

Her mother brought up the children after a separation and divorce. While growing up, she was interested in a variety of sports, playing baseball, softball and football with boys, before settling on basketball as her primary sport. She played basketball primarily on pickup teams with boys, not playing on a girls' team until she was a high school sophomore.

Lieberman's mother Renee was not supportive of her daughter's interest in basketball. Once, when Lieberman was practicing dribbling techniques indoors because it was cold outside, her mother demanded she stop dribbling because of all the noise. When she did not stop, her mother punctured the basketball with a screwdriver. Lieberman found another ball and continued, but her mother punctured that one as well. This continued until five balls were ruined. Lieberman then decided she had better go outside before she ran out of basketballs.

== Playing career ==
=== High school career ===
While attending Far Rockaway High School in Queens, she established herself as one of the top women's basketball players in the country by earning one of the 12 coveted slots on the USA's National Team. In 1975, while still in her teens, Lieberman was named to the USA Team designated to play in the World Championships and Pan American Games, where the team won a gold medal.

During the school year, she played for her high school team, but in the summer, played with an Amateur Athletic Union team in Harlem, the New York Chuckles.

She told former Knick Walt Frazier that he was her hero and that it was because of him that she wore No. 10, saying: "You might not even know this, but you thought you were affecting young guys but you were affecting young, white Jewish women, not just boys."

=== College career ===
Lieberman originally was a verbal commitment to Canisius University before being heavily recruited by Old Dominion University in Norfolk, Virginia, where she attended from 1976 to 1980 and played on the women's basketball team there. During that time, she and her team won two consecutive AIAW National Championships (1979, 1980) and one WNIT (Women's National Invitation Tournament) Championship in 1978. She was the first two-time winner of the prestigious Wade Trophy, a national player of the year award in college women's basketball, and was selected as the Broderick Award winner for basketball as the top women's player in America. Lieberman also won three consecutive Kodak All-America awards (1978, '79, '80). Lieberman was one of six young adults to win the Young American Award from the Boy Scouts of America in 1980.

Lieberman earned the nickname "Lady Magic," a nod to Earvin "Magic" Johnson of NBA fame. Lieberman set a school record for career assists (961) that still stands today. She led the team in assists each of the four years she was on the team—in her sophomore year she averaged 8.9 per game. Lieberman amassed 2,430 points along with 1,167 rebounds in her collegiate career, producing an average of 18.1 points per game. Lieberman achieved a triple double (40 points, 15 rebounds, 11 assists) against Norfolk State in her sophomore year. Lieberman stole the ball 562 times and assisted a basket 961 times in her college career, believed to be modern records. She is the holder of several single-game and single-season records, including best free-throw shooting percentage in her freshman and sophomore years.

Lieberman earned her degree in Interdisciplinary Studies from Old Dominion University on May 6, 1980. She was inducted into the ODU Sports Hall of Fame in 1985.

=== Professional career ===
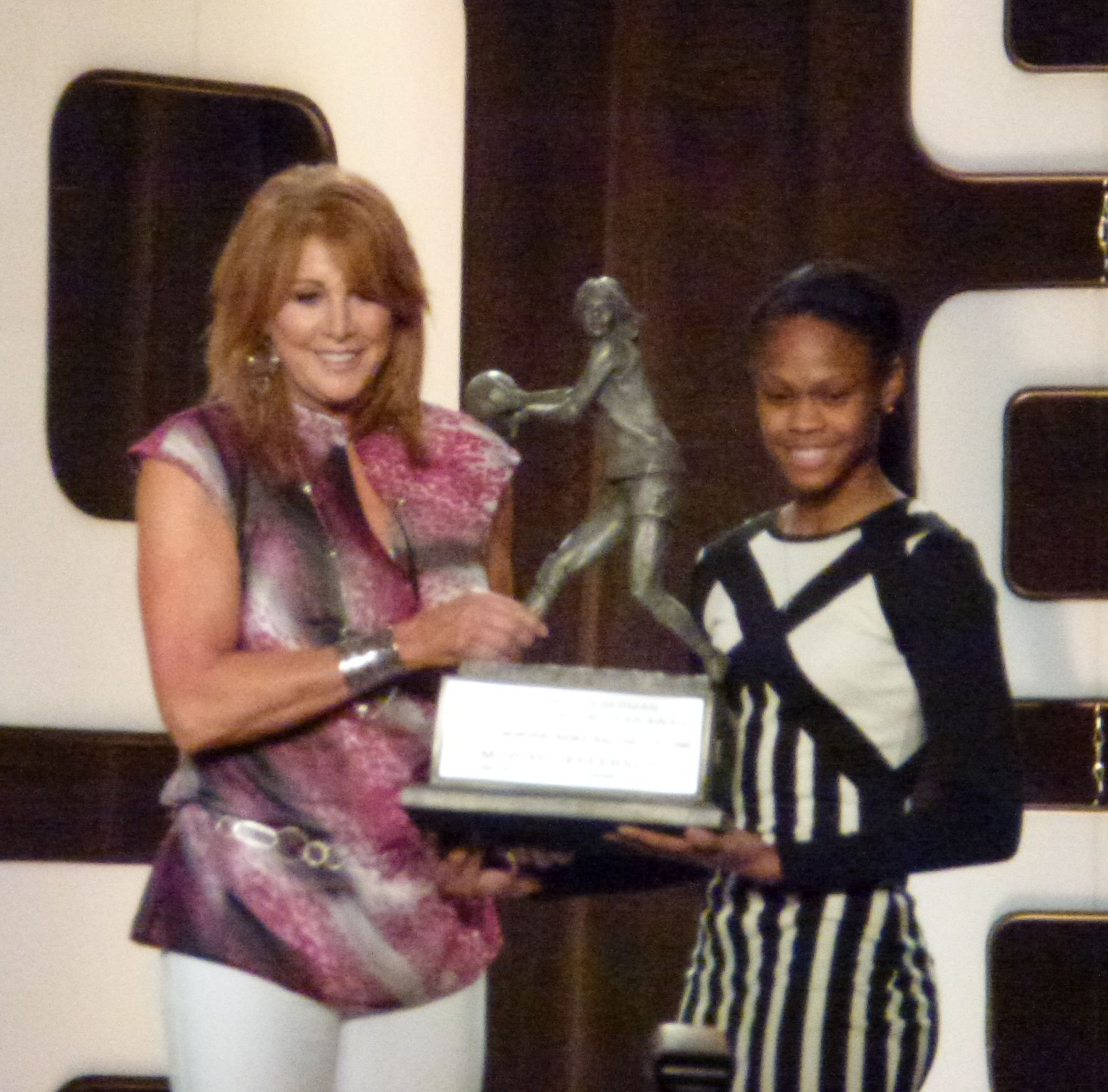
Lieberman presenting a trophy to Moriah Jefferson

In 1980 she was selected with the first pick in the Women's Pro Basketball League (WBL) draft by the Dallas Diamonds. She helped Dallas to the 1981 WBL finals, where they lost to the Nebraska Wranglers in five games. She was named the "rookie of the year", after averaging 26.3 points per game. Lieberman's WBL career is featured in the book Mad Seasons: The Story of the First Women's Professional Basketball League, 1978–1981.

In 1981, she played for the Los Angeles Lakers Summer Pro League team.

In 1984, she once again suited up for the Dallas Diamonds, signing a three-year, $250,000 contract with the team to play in the Women's American Basketball Association (WABA). Averaging 27 points per game and voted the league's Most Valuable Player, she helped Dallas win the 1984 WABA championship, but the league folded after the season. The final game played was between the Diamonds and the WABA All-Stars, where Lieberman scored 19 points and was named the game's MVP in the Diamonds' 101–94 victory.

In 1986, Lieberman signed with the Springfield Fame of the men's professional United States Basketball League (USBL) where she went on to average 1.7 points in 11 minutes per game. She remained in the league the following season, playing for the Long Island Knights. Later, she toured with the Washington Generals, who served as the regular opponent of the Harlem Globetrotters, where she met her future husband, teammate Tim Cline.

She was elected to the Basketball Hall of Fame as a player in 1996 and to the Women's Basketball Hall of Fame in 1999.

In the newly formed WNBA's inaugural year in 1997, Lieberman played for the Phoenix Mercury. At the age of 39, she was the WNBA's oldest player. On July 24, 2008, at 50 years old, Lieberman signed a seven-day contract with the eventual WNBA Champion Detroit Shock, breaking her own previous record as the oldest player in league history and returning to the franchise she coached a decade prior.

That same day, the Shock played a game against the Houston Comets where Lieberman saw playing time. Lieberman recorded two assists in nine minutes of playing time, but Detroit lost the game 79–61. This ended up being her final WNBA game, as she was waived the next day on July 25, 2008. The Shock went on to win the WNBA Finals that season.

=== National team career ===
At age 17, Lieberman was named to the USA Basketball team roster. She played for the team in the 1975 USA Women's Pan American Team, three years younger than the next youngest teammates. The games were held in Mexico City, Mexico in October. The Pan Am team had failed to win the gold in 1967 and 1971. In 1975, the team was more successful, compiling a 7–0 record, and winning the gold medal for the first time since 1963.

Lieberman continued with the USA team to the 1976 Olympics in Montreal in the first women's Olympic basketball team competition. Shortly after turning 18, Lieberman became the youngest basketball player in Olympic history to win a medal, when the United States captured the silver medal.

Lieberman was named to the team representing the US at the 1979 William Jones Cup competition in Taipei. The USA team won all six games on the way to the gold medal. Lieberman earned a spot on the Jones Cup All-Tournament Team.

Lieberman played with the team at the 1979 Pan American Games in San Juan, Puerto Rico. Although the team easily won most of their games, they lost to Cuba, 91–86, and received the silver medal.

In 1980, Lieberman earned a slot on the 1980 Olympic team, but withdrew from the squad in support of U.S. President Jimmy Carter's boycott of the 1980 Summer Olympics in Moscow. She failed to make the final roster for the 1990 Goodwill Games and the 1992 Olympics.

== Coaching career ==
=== WNBA ===
In 1998, Lieberman was hired as general manager and head coach of the Detroit Shock. She coached for three seasons, leading the team to a winning record (17–13) in their inaugural season. After being fired after the 2000 season, Lieberman worked as a women's basketball analyst for ESPN.

=== NBA Development League ===
In November 2009, Lieberman was named head coach of the Texas Legends, the NBA Development League affiliate of the Dallas Mavericks, making her the first woman to coach a men's professional basketball team. The team began play in November 2010. She later moved to a front office position with the Legends before joining Fox Sports Oklahoma as an analyst for the Oklahoma City Thunder studio show, Thunder Live.

=== NBA ===
In July 2015, she was hired by the Sacramento Kings as an assistant coach, becoming the second female assistant coach in NBA history. She took two leaves of absence to care for her ailing mother before leaving the Kings in 2017. After the Kings, she became a broadcaster with the New Orleans Pelicans.

=== BIG3 ===
On March 21, 2018, it was announced that Lieberman was hired as a head coach of Power in the BIG3 league, replacing Clyde Drexler. In her first season as head coach, she led her team to the 2018 Championship, defeating 3's Company to become the first ever female coach in the BIG3 to win a championship.

== Career statistics ==
=== College ===
Legend
GP	Games played	GS	Games started	MPG	Minutes per game	RPG	Rebounds per game
APG	Assists per game	SPG	Steals per game	BPG	Blocks per game	PPG	Points per game
TO	Turnovers per game	FG%	Field-goal percentage	3P%	3-point field-goal percentage	FT%	Free-throw percentage
**Bold**	Career best	°	League leader

Year	Team	GP	Points	FG%	FT%	RPG	APG	BPG	PPG
1976-77	Old Dominion University	27	563	47.3%	70.9%	**10.1**	7.9	0.0	**20.9**
1977-78	Old Dominion University	34	**681**	43.2%	73.0%	9.6	5.9	0.0	20.0
1978-79	Old Dominion University	36	625	47.8%	**79.0%**	7.7	7.1	0.4	17.4
1979-80	Old Dominion University	**37**	561	**53.3%**	77.9%	8.0	**8.0**	**0.6**	15.2
Career		134	2430	47.2%	75.7%	8.7	7.2	0.3	18.1

=== WNBA ===
==== Regular season ====
Year	Team	GP	GS	MPG	FG%	3P%	FT%	RPG	APG	SPG	BPG	TO	PPG
1997	Phoenix	**25**	0	**11.2**	**.325**	**.231**	**.800**	**1.3**	1.6	**0.6**	**0.1**	**1.6**	**2.6**
2008	Detroit	1	0	9.0	.000	–	–	0.0	**2.0**	0.0	0.0	2.0	0.0
Career	2 years, 2 teams	26	0	11.1	.321	.231	.800	1.2	1.6	0.5	0.1	1.6	2.5

==== Playoffs ====
Year	Team	GP	GS	MPG	FG%	3P%	FT%	RPG	APG	SPG	BPG	TO	PPG
1997	Phoenix	1	0	1.0	–	–	–	0.0	0.0	0.0	1.0	0.0	0.0

== Head coaching record ==
Legend
Regular season	G	Games coached	W	Games won	L	Games lost	W–L %	Win–loss %
Playoffs	PG	Playoff games	PW	Playoff wins	PL	Playoff losses	PW–L %	Playoff win–loss %

=== WNBA ===
Team	Year	G	W	L	W–L%	Finish	PG	PW	PL	PW–L%	Result
Detroit	1998	30	17	13	.567	4th in Eastern	—	—	—	—	Missed playoffs
Detroit	1999	32	15	17	.469	2nd in Eastern	1	0	1	.000	Lost in first round
Detroit	2000	32	14	18	.438	4th in Eastern	—	—	—	—	Missed playoffs
Career		94	46	48	.489		1	0	1	.000	

=== NBA Development League ===
Team	Year	G	W	L	W–L%	Finish	PG	PW	PL	PW–L%	Result
Texas	2010–11	50	24	26	.480	6th in Western	3	1	2	.333	Lost First Round (Tulsa) 1–2

== Awards and honors ==
- 1979-Winner of the Honda Sports Award for basketball
- 1979-The Honda-Broderick Cup winner for all sports.
- 1980-Winner of the Honda Sports Award for basketball
- 1999-Inducted into the Women's Basketball Hall of Fame
- 2000-Nancy Lieberman Award created
- 2022-Statue of her unveiled at Old Dominion University; the first statue of a former ODU athlete at the university

== Personal life ==
Lieberman lived with tennis star Martina Navratilova for several years beginning in 1981 and she also served as her physical trainer, contributing to Navratilova's return to the number one ranking in 1982.

In 1988, Lieberman married one of her teammates with the Generals, Tim Cline, taking the surname Lieberman-Cline until the couple's divorce on March 15, 2001.

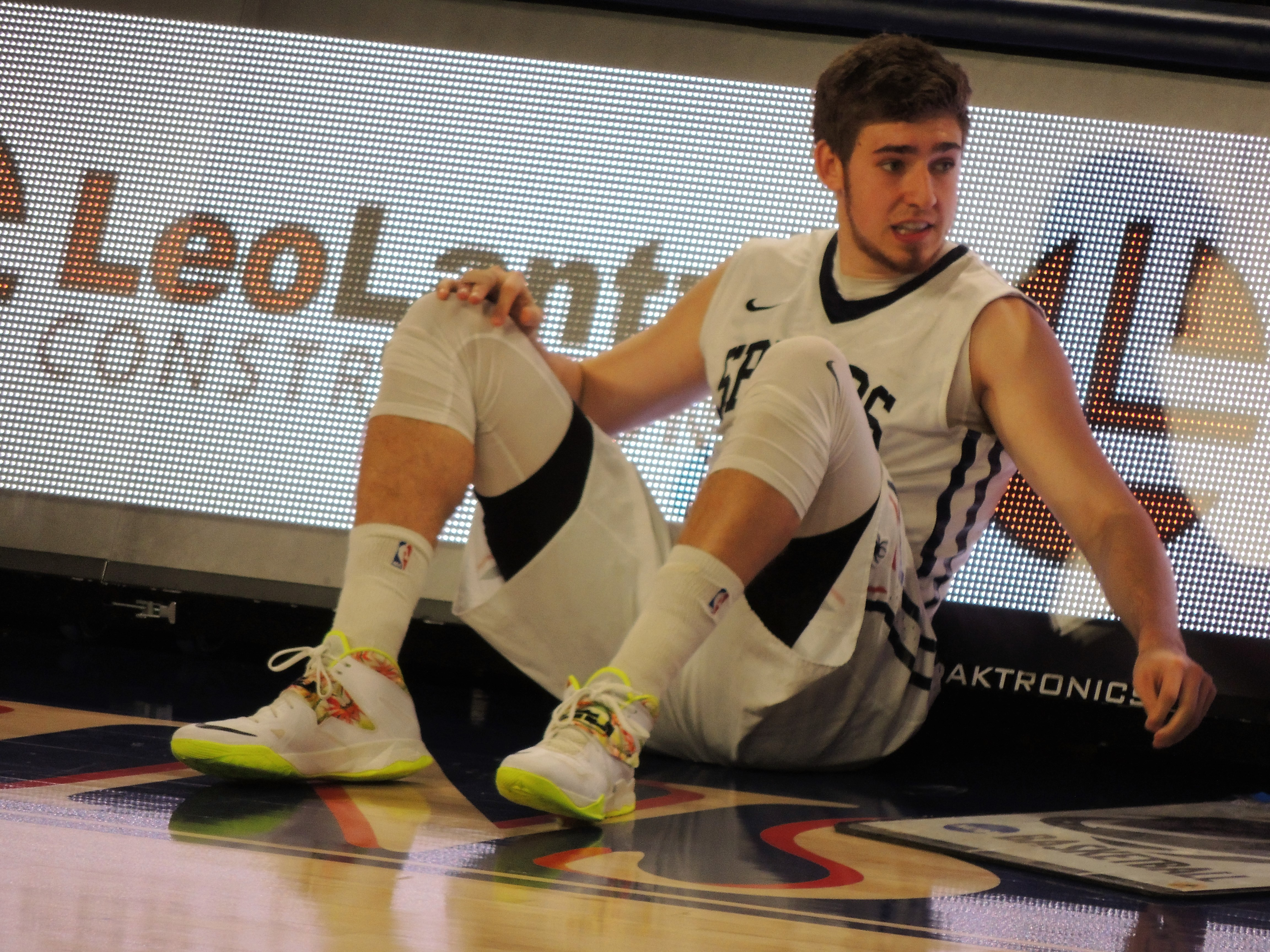
T. J. Cline, her son.

Their son T. J. Cline played college basketball for the Richmond Spiders, and in November 2017 signed to play for Israeli team Hapoel Holon, which plays in the Ligat HaAl, the top division of Israeli basketball.

In regard to religious matters, despite her Jewish upbringing, Lieberman became a Christian late in her life and was described as having embraced born-again Christianity in a 2015 Jerusalem Post article. Nonetheless, she said in an interview in 2010, "I am 100% Jewish. My father's parents were deeply religious, we had two sets of silverware when we went and ate over there. My mother's side observed the major holidays. It was more relaxed. I went to Hebrew school as well." In 2011, she visited Israel with her mother, saying "It has changed my outlook of Israel. I know as a Jewish woman how important it is for me to be connected to this culture and to this community."

Lieberman was a contestant on the season 4 Gold Medal Challenge of Champions special of American Gladiators. She was eliminated after the third event with the lowest score of the three female competitors.

On August 13, 2008, she was part of the inaugural class to be inducted into the Hampton Roads Sports Hall of Fame, honoring athletes, coaches and administrators who made contributions to sports in Southeastern Virginia.

== See also ==
- List of female NBA coaches
- Nancy Lieberman Award
- List of select Jewish basketball players
- WBCBL Professional Basketball Trailblazer Award
