= Tri-State (basketball) =

American men's basketball team

- Leagues: Big3
- Founded: 1 March 2017; 9 years ago
- Location: United States
- Team colors: Red, Navy Blue, White
- Head coach: Julius Erving
- Website: big3.com/teams/tri-state/

Tri-State is an American men's professional 3-on-3 basketball team that plays in the Big3.

== 2017 ==
=== Draft ===
| Pick | Player | NBA experience | Last club |
|---|---|---|---|
| 4 | Xavier Silas | 1 year | (United States) Northern Arizona Suns |
| 13 | Lee Nailon | 8 years | (Mexico) Panteras de Aguascalientes |
| 23 | Mike James | 12 years | (United States) Texas Legends |

== 2018 ==
=== Draft ===
| Pick | Player | NBA experience | Last club |
|---|---|---|---|
| 5 | David Hawkins | none | (Turkey) Galatasaray |
| 12 | Robert Hite | 1 year | (United States) Canton Charge |
| 18 | Bonzi Wells | 10 years | (Puerto Rico) Capitanes de Arecibo |

== Current roster ==
2017 Tri-State roster
Players

| Pos. | No. | Player | Height | Weight | DOB | From |
|---|---|---|---|---|---|---|
| G/F | 34 | David Hawkins | 6 ft 5 in (1.96 m) | 225 lb (102 kg) | 1982-10-28 | Temple |
| G | - | Robert Hite | 6 ft 2 in (1.88 m) | 184 lb (83 kg) | 1984-01-12 | Miami (FL) |
| PF/C | 7 | Jermaine O'Neal (C) | 6 ft 11 in (2.11 m) | 255 lb (116 kg) | 1978-10-13 | Eau Claire HS (SC) |
| PG | 11 | Nate Robinson (CC) | 5 ft 9 in (1.75 m) | 173 lb (78 kg) | 1984-05-31 | Washington |
| PF/C | - | Amar'e Stoudemire (CC) | 6 ft 10 in (2.08 m) | 245 lb (111 kg) | 1982-11-16 | Cypress Creek HS (FL) |
| G/F | 6 | Bonzi Wells | 6 ft 5 in (1.96 m) | 210 lb (95 kg) | 1976-09-28 | Ball State |

Coaches
Head coach
- Julius Erving

Legend
- (DP) Unsigned draft pick
- (FA) Free agent
- (S) Suspended
- (CC) Team co-captain
- Injured

Roster
Updated: 2018-06-23

== Head coaches ==
| Years Active | Name | BIG3 Championships |
|---|---|---|
| 2017-2024 | Julius Erving | 0 |
