= Dallas Power =

BIG3 basketball team

- Leagues: BIG3
- Founded: 29 March 2017; 9 years ago
- History: Power (2017-2024); Dallas Power (2025-present)
- Capacity: American Airlines Center
- Location: Dallas, Texas, United States
- Team colors: Light royal blue, silver, black, white
- Head coach: Nancy Lieberman
- Championships: 1 (2018)
- Website: big3.com/teams/dallas-power

The Dallas Power are an American men's 3-on-3 basketball team based in Dallas, Texas that plays in the BIG3 league. A stake in the team was purchased in 2022 by The Aces, a sports entertainment company.

Originally without a home city for their first seven seasons, the Power were announced to be based in Dallas when the league switched to a city-based model for the 2025 season.

They are the 2018 BIG3 season champions.

== History ==
=== 2017 ===
==== Draft ====
Pick	Player	NBA experience	Last club
6	Jerome Williams	9 years	(United States) New York Knicks
11	DeShawn Stevenson	13 years	(United States) Atlanta Hawks
20	Moochie Norris	8 years	(United States) Yakima Sun Kings

==== Season Performance ====
Power were one of the teams who made the playoffs at the end of the BIG3 inaugural season of 2017.

Their run quickly ended with a semifinal loss to the 3 Headed Monsters. They lost a consolation game the next week, and finished 4th overall.

=== 2018 ===
==== Draft ====
Pick	Player	NBA experience	Last club
4	Chris Andersen	15 years	(United States) Cleveland Cavaliers
10	Quentin Richardson	13 years	(United States) New York Knicks
17	Ryan Gomes	8 years	(United States) Los Angeles D-Fenders

==== Season Performance ====
Power went on to win the BIG3 championship in 2018. It was their first championship.

=== 2019 ===
==== Draft ====
As the reigning champs, Power did not have the opportunity to make a draft selection but they kept all six players from last year's squad.

==== Season Performance ====
Power made the playoffs for the third consecutive year in 2019. They were unable to repeat their 2018 championship run, losing in the semifinals.

=== 2021 ===
==== Draft ====
Pick	Player	NBA experience	Last club
3	Dušan Bulut	0 years	(Serbia) Novi Sad
11	Joe Alexander	2 years	(Israel) Hapoel Holon B.C.

==== Season Performance ====
TBD

=== 2022 ===
==== Draft ====
Pick	Player	NBA experience	Last club
1	Glen Rice Jr.	2 years	(Israel) Maccabi Haifa
15	T. J. Cline	0 years	(Spain) MoraBanc Andorra

==== Season Performance ====
TBD

== Current roster ==
2025 Dallas Power roster
Players

Pos.	No.	Player	Height	Weight	DOB	From
PF/C	-	Greg Monroe (C)	6 ft 11 in (2.11 m)	260 lb (118 kg)	1990-06-04	Georgetown
PF	-	Paul Millsap (CC)	6 ft 7 in (2.01 m)	257 lb (117 kg)	1985-05-10	Louisiana Tech
G/F	-	Glen Rice Jr. (CC)	6 ft 6 in (1.98 m)	206 lb (93 kg)	1991-01-01	Georgia Tech
C/M	-	John Millsap	6 ft 6 in (1.98 m)	220 lb (100 kg)	1982-10-09	Texas–San Antonio
PF/C	-	T. J. Cline	6 ft 9 in (2.06 m)	269 lb (122 kg)	1994-07-22	Richmond

Coaches
Head coach
- Nancy Lieberman

Legend
- (DP) Unsigned draft pick
- (FA) Free agent
- (S) Suspended
- (CC) Team co-captain
- Injured

Roster
Updated: 2025-06-30

== Head coaches ==
Years Active	Name	BIG3 Championships
2017	Clyde Drexler	0
2018-present	Nancy Lieberman	1

== Alumni ==
- Chris Andersen
- Corey Maggette
- Deshawn Stevenson
- Dušan Bulut (2021)
- Glen Davis
- Jerome Williams
- Joe Alexander (2021)
- Moochie Norris
- Ryan Gomes
- Quentin Richardson
- Xavier Silas
