= Raymond Nixon =

American basketball player

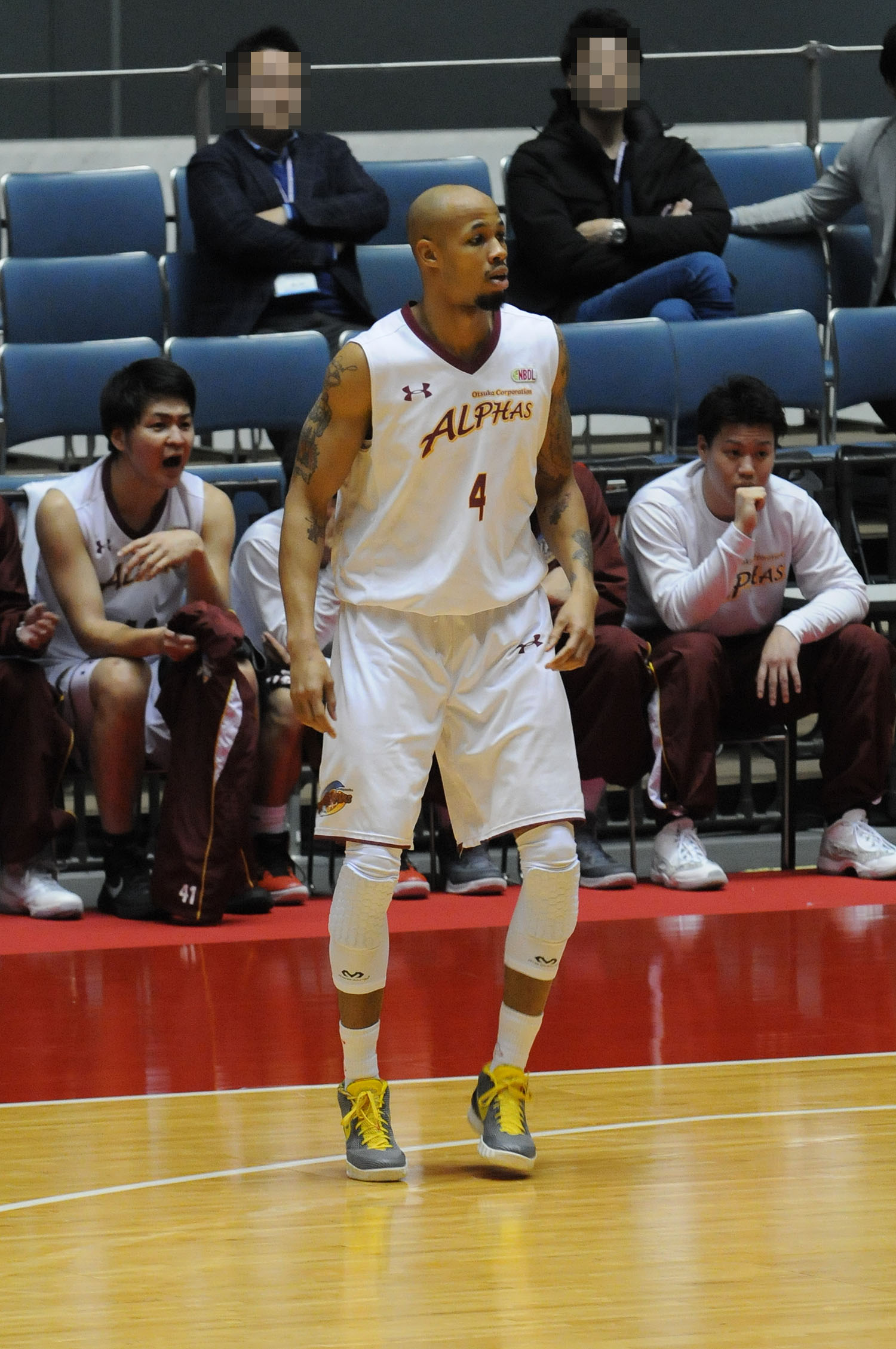

Personal information
- Born: September 10, 1984 (age 42) Milwaukee, Wisconsin, U.S.
- Listed height: 6 ft 8 in (2.03 m)
- Listed weight: 230 lb (104 kg)

Career information
- High school: Dominican (Whitefish Bay, Wisconsin)
- College: Wisconsin (2002–2006)
- NBA draft: 2006: undrafted
- Playing career: 2006–present
- Position: Forward

Career history
- 2006–2008: Walter Tigers Tübingen
- 2008–2009: Namika Lahti
- 2009: SPO Rouen Basket
- 2009–2010: Namika Lahti
- 2010–2011: Hamamatsu Higashimikawa Phoenix
- 2011–2013: Shiga Lakestars
- 2013–2014: Hamamatsu Higashimikawa Phoenix
- 2014–2015: Shiga Lakestars
- 2015–2019: Otsuka Corporation Alphas
- 2019-2020: Tampereen Pyrintö (basketball)
- 2022-present: Detroit Amps (basketball)

Career highlights
- bj League champions (2011)

Raymond Nixon (born September 10, 1984) is an American professional basketball player who plays for Boston Ball Hogs in Big3.
