= Big3 =

Professional basketball league set up in a 3-on-3 concept featuring former NBA players

- Current season, competition or edition: 2027 Big3 season
- Sport: 3x3 basketball
- Founded: January 11, 2017; 9 years ago
- Founder: Ice Cube; Jeff Kwatinetz
- First season: 2017
- CEO: Ice Cube
- Commissioner: Clyde Drexler
- No. of teams: 8
- Country: United States
- Headquarters: Los Angeles, California
- Most recent champions: Boston Ball Hogs (1st title)
- Most titles: DMV Trilogy (3 titles)
- Broadcaster: CBS/Paramount+
- Website: BIG3.com

Big3 (stylized BIG3) is a 3-on-3 basketball league founded by rapper and actor Ice Cube and businessman Jeff Kwatinetz. The league consists of 8 teams whose rosters include both former NBA players and international players. The rules of Big3 games contain deviations from the official rules of 3-on-3 basketball as administered by FIBA. It debuted in 2017 and takes place during the NBA offseason. In January 2020, Big3 announced its rule set would be the core of a new basketball variant called "Fireball3" (stylized FIREBALL3).

== History ==
On January 11, 2017, Ice Cube and Jeff Kwatinetz announced their new 3-on-3 basketball league at the Sheraton Times Square Hotel, in New York City. Roger Mason Jr. was the first President and Commissioner. The Big3 held its first draft on April 30, and the inaugural week of games took place June 25 at the Barclays Center, in Brooklyn, New York. On August 26, 2017, Trilogy defeated the 3 Headed Monsters 51–46 in the inaugural Big3 Championship game, completing a perfect (10–0) season. The league's Most Valuable Player award was won by 3 Headed Monsters forward Rashard Lewis; Trilogy's undefeated season led to several awards for members of the team, including Defensive Player of the Year (James White) and Coach of the Year (Rick Mahorn).

On March 15, 2018, Clyde Drexler became the second Commissioner, replacing Roger Mason. On April 3, the Big3 and Adidas agreed on a three-year partnership in which Adidas would launch a full retail line of sneakers, clothing, and equipment to launch in 2019. In conjunction with Adidas, the Big3 launched Young3, a youth initiative for underprivileged young kids, that was held in each city with Boys & Girls Clubs of America. At the conclusion of the 2018 regular season, the Power and 3 Headed Monsters were both tied for the league's best record (7–1); the Power would advance to the championship game, while the 3 Headed Monsters were ultimately eliminated by 3's Company in the semifinals. On August 24, 2018, the Power defeated 3's Company 51–43 to become the league's second champions. Power's Corey Maggette was awarded MVP and Captain of the Year, while Power's Nancy Lieberman was awarded Coach of the Year.

On January 15, 2020, Big3 made several major announcements, further lowering its age limit to 22, instituting open tryouts for league players, introducing some additional rule changes, and starting use of Fireball3 to describe its rule set. The competition would not be held in 2020 as a result of the COVID-19 pandemic. To ensure the league would have a 2021 season, the league took a $1.6 million Paycheck Protection Program loan during the pandemic, returning $700,000.

On February 8, 2021, Big3 announced Chris Hannan, a former senior executive with Fox Sports and Endeavor/IMG, would be assuming the role of Chief Executive Officer.

On August 4, 2021, Ice Cube said that the league is one of his greatest accomplishments. He also wants to expand the league to 16 teams to create a 'Big Cup.'

In September 2022, Ice Cube replaced Hannan as the new CEO, whereas league co-founder Jeff Kwatinetz was named president.

Jaylen Brown played in the 2023 BIG3 All-Star game, the first active NBA player to play in the league.

On March 27, 2024, Ice Cube offered Caitlin Clark a $5 million private contract to play in Big3, stating that she is a 'generational athlete' who would find 'tremendous success' in the league. In June 2025, the Big3's courtside reporter Rachel DeMita was fired for posting on social media about Clark while she was working as a courtside correspondent at a Big3 event.

=== Expansions ===
==== 2019 ====
On January 11, 2019, the Big3 announced that they would expand to 12 teams for the upcoming season, and move to two nights (consisting of three games each) per week. The league would also play in 18 cities, and it would allow players as young as 27 to compete in the league.

==== 2024 ====
On May 10, 2024, the Big3 announced that the 2024 Season (Season 7) will be the final season operating under this existing model, and following this season, all teams will transition to representing home markets. On the same day, the Big3 announced their first purchase, $10 million, of rights for a team. This will also be the first team to represent a home market. The purchase is by a consortium of investors led by DCB Sports and a mix of professional athletes and celebrities. The Los Angeles-based Big3 team will debut in season eight (8) in 2025. On June 15, 2024, the Big3 announced that a group of investors, led by business executive Heath Freeman, had purchased the rights to the second-ever location-based Big3 franchise for $10 million with plans to base the team in Miami. The Miami-based Big3 team will also debut in 2025. On July 3, 2024, it was announced that the Big3 had sold rights to the third location-based Big3 team. Eric Mullins and Milton Carroll had made the purchase with plans to base the team in Houston, debuting in 2025. On July 8, 2024, the Big3 announced that GameAbove Sports, sports-focused business development and strategic investment entity, had purchased the rights to the fourth location-based Big3 franchise with plans to base the team in Detroit, debuting in 2025.

== Rules ==
The rules of Fireball3, the basketball variant played by Big3, differ from FIBA-sanctioned 3-on-3 (branded as 3x3) games. They are as follows:

- Like FIBA-sanctioned 3x3, games are played on a half-court. (The official FIBA 3x3 court is actually shorter than half of a full FIBA court, but FIBA rules allow half of a regulation FIBA court to be used.)
- Standard two- and three-point shots apply; the three-point line is the same distance as in the NBA. (3x3 uses the FIBA arc, with shots from outside the arc worth 2 points and all others worth 1.)
- Unique to Fireball3 are three "four-point zones" on a circle 30 feet (9.1 m; 910 cm) away from the basket. One is on the midline of the court; the other two are 40 degrees away from the midline. To score four points, a player's foot must be touching any part of a circle.
- Neither Fireball3 nor 3x3 use a jump ball to start the game, but nonetheless differ significantly in start procedures. In Fireball3, the two teams participate in a pregame do-or-die 4-point shootout. The shootout winner becomes the designated "home" team, and will inbound first. In 3x3, the first possession is determined by a pregame coin toss, with the winner choosing whether to take possession at the start of a game or the start of a potential overtime.
- The shot clock runs 14 seconds, as opposed to 12 in 3x3.
- An additional free throw is taken if a player is fouled while making a shot.
- A shooting foul awards one free throw, worth the same number of points as the fouled shot. Two-point shots are taken from the free throw line, three-point shots from the three-point line, four-point shots from the midline four-point circle. The free throw is awarded whether or not the fouled shot hits the basket. 3x3 follows standard FIBA rules for free throws after shooting fouls, with the exception of bonus situations (see next item). Normally, if the basket attempt was made, one free throw is awarded, and if the basket attempt was missed, a number of free throws equal to the value of the shot attempt is awarded. Additionally, all free throws in 3x3 are worth 1 point, as they are in standard full-court basketball.
- Similar to 3x3, fouls are ascribed to the team; players cannot foul out. However, the bonus free throw rules differ between the two rule sets. In Fireball3, after the fifth team foul in each half, opponents are guaranteed two one-point free throws and possession of the ball. Teams do not enter the bonus in 3x3 until the 7th team foul in a game, at which point the non-fouling team receives two free throws, but not possession. Only on the 10th team foul does the non-fouling team receive two free throws and possession. Under FIBA 3x3 rules, the normal rules for free throws on shooting fouls are specifically superseded by the bonus rules.
- 3x3 also has unique rules regarding team foul accumulation that are not mirrored in Fireball3. All personal fouls count as 1 team foul, as in Fireball3. However, in 3x3, each technical foul adds 1 to the team foul count, and each foul classified as "unsportsmanlike" (essentially the same as "flagrant" fouls in Fireball3) or "disqualifying" (an especially violent foul, resulting in immediate disqualification) adds 2 to the team foul count.
- A team's first technical foul results in one two-point free throw and possession. Additional technical fouls, as well as all flagrant fouls, result in two two-point free throws and possession. In 3x3, technical fouls result in one (1-point) free throw and possession during open play; the first unsportsmanlike foul against a player results in two free throws without possession; and any foul that results in disqualification (either a player's second unsportsmanlike foul or a disqualifying foul) results in two free throws and possession.
- To win, a team must score 50 or more points, and lead by at least two points (hence there is no overtime). In 3x3, the game ends by rule after 10 minutes of play, or if a team reaches at least 21 points, with no required victory margin. If the teams are tied, 3x3 uses an untimed overtime with the shot clock enforced, and the first team that scores 2 points in the overtime wins.
- Halftime happens after one team reaches 25 points. 3x3 has only a single period of 10 minutes.
- Each team receives two timeouts—a 60-second and a 30-second—per half. Unused timeouts do not carry over. 3x3 allows only one timeout per team.
- Substitutions can be made on a dead ball or by calling a timeout.
- After a score, a referee must touch the ball. After giving the defense 3 seconds to set, the opposing team must take the ball beyond the top out-of-bounds line. Player has 5 seconds to return the ball inbounds. In 3x3, a referee is not required to be involved in a change of possession after the score. Instead, the non-scoring team takes possession of the ball directly under the basket, and at that point is free to dribble or pass the ball, but no shot is legal until the ball has been cleared beyond the arc.
- Defensive rebounds must be cleared if the ball touched the rim. If the ball did not touch the rim, defensive rebounds do not need to be cleared. In 3x3, all defensive rebounds must be cleared.
- Steals do not have to be cleared, unlike in 3x3.
- In both Fireball3 and 3x3, the ball is cleared when the player with the ball establishes both feet behind the 3-point line. The ball can be cleared by dribbling or passing.
- A defensive rebounder who makes a direct pass that clears the ball must clear the lane and re-establish himself before his team's shot or pass hits the rim.
- If, following a defensive rebound after the ball touches the rim, the rebounding team shoots or passes before clearing the ball and the ball hits the rim, it results in a turnover. This rule is identical to 3x3, and in that variant also extends to all changes of possession.
- Once a team has cleared the ball and establishes itself on offense, the normal "3 seconds in the key" rule applies.
- There is no defensive "3-second" rule, unlike in 3x3 and the NBA.
- Instant replay applies and can be used to determine 3- and 4-point shots, out-of-bounds, flagrant fouls, goaltending, basket interference and clearance.
- All defensive strategies are allowed, including hand-checking, which is banned in the NBA.
- Effective in 2021, each team may challenge one foul call per half under a rule that the Big3 league calls "Bring the Fire". A challenge results in an in-game one-on-one possession, with the winner's team winning the call.
- The ball used, colored red and called the "Fireball" (stylized FIREBALL) since 2021, is the same size 7 ball used in the men's full-court game (standard circumference 29.5 in/75 cm, standard weight 22 oz/620 g). This differs from the ball used in all adult 3x3 competitions (whether for men, women, or mixed teams), which weighs the same as a size 7 ball but has the circumference of a size 6 ball (28.5 in) used in the women's full-court game.

During the 2017 and 2018 seasons, players under 30 years old were not eligible to compete in the league. In 2019, the league changed the minimum age to 27 years, and in 2021, the minimum age was lowered again to 22.

== Teams ==
The Big3 began play in 2017 with eight teams: 3's Company, 3 Headed Monsters, Ball Hogs, Ghost Ballers, Killer 3's, Power, Trilogy, and Tri-State. In 2019, the league expanded to twelve teams, adding Bivouac, Enemies, Aliens, and Triplets. All Big3 teams were "barnstorming" teams prior to 2025 and did not represent any cities or geographical regions. In 2025 the format was changed so that each team had a location and would host one week of the regular season.

=== 2017–2024 ===
Team	Coach	Players	Joined
3's Company	Michael Cooper	List: Mario Chalmers (captain) Michael Beasley (co-captain) Reggie Evans (co-captain) Nasir Core Sean Williams	2017
3 Headed Monsters	Rashard Lewis	List: Jeff Teague (captain) Marquis Teague (co-captain) Greg Monroe (co-captain) Shakur Juiston Brandon Moss Jeremy Tyler (alternate) Jalil Abdul-Bassit (alternate)	2017
Aliens	Rick Mahorn	List: Paul Millsap (captain) John Millsap (co-captain) Al Jefferson (co-captain) Devin Ebanks Abraham Millsap Brion Rush (alternate)	2019
Ball Hogs	Rick Barry	List: Leandro Barbosa (captain) Jodie Meeks (co-captain) DaJuan Summers (co-captain) Larry Sanders Lucas Mariano	2017
Bivouac	Reggie Theus (2019–2021); Gary Payton (2022–2024)	List: Gerald Green (captain) Corey Brewer (co-captain) Garlon Green (co-captain) Javier Carter Jaylen Johnson Kyle Wiltjer (alternate)	2019
Enemies	Rick Mahorn (2019); Gilbert Arenas (2021–2023); Nick Young (2023–2024)	List: Jordan Crawford (captain) Isaiah Austin (co-captain) Elijah Stewart (co-captain) Quincy Miller Chris Allen	2019
Ghost Ballers	George Gervin	List: Mike Taylor (captain) Chris Johnson (co-captain) Darnell Jackson (co-captain) Mo Charlo DeWayne Jackson Stefhon Hannah (alternate)	2017
Killer 3's	Charles Oakley	List: Franklin Session (captain) Donte Greene (co-captain) Josh Powell (co-captain) Dominique Johnson Will Felder Dazeran Jones (alternate)	2017
Power	Nancy Lieberman	List: Glen Rice Jr. (captain) T.J. Cline (co-captain) Royce White (co-captain) Marcus Foster Deshawn Stephens Adam Drexler (alternate)	2017
Trilogy	Stephen Jackson	List: Earl Clark (captain) Isaiah Briscoe (co-captain) Cady Lalanne (co-captain) Roscoe Smith James White	2017
Tri-State	Julius Erving	List: Jason Richardson (captain) Kevin Murphy (co-captain) Amir Johnson (co-captain) Henry Sims Raymond Nixon	2017
Triplets	Lisa Leslie	List: Joe Johnson (captain) Jannero Pargo (co-captain) Jeremy Pargo (co-captain) Jeff Ayres Jamario Moon Teddy Gipson (alternate)	2019

=== 2025–present ===
BIG3 teams 2025–present
Team	Coach	Players	City	Joined
Boston Ball Hogs	Gary Payton	List: Jeremy Pargo (captain) Garlon Green (co-captain) Deshawn Stephens (co-captain) Quincy Miller Raymond Nixon	Boston	2017
Chicago Triplets	Julius Erving	List: Montrezl Harrell (captain) Amir Johnson (co-captain) Brandon Moss (co-captain) Wesley Johnson Leandro Barbosa	Chicago	2019
Dallas Power	Nancy Lieberman	List: Greg Monroe (captain) Cameron Smith (co-captain) Glen Rice Jr. (co-captain) TJ Cline Elijah Stewart	Dallas	2017
Detroit Amps	Rick Mahorn	List: Joe Johnson (captain) Nasir Core (co-captain) Corey Brewer (co-captain) Donté Greene Henry Sims Chris Johnson	Detroit	2025
DMV Trilogy	Stephen Jackson	List: Earl Clark (captain) Willie Reed (co-captain) James Johnson (co-captain) Franklin Session Jaylen Johnson	Baltimore	2017
Houston Rig Hands	Calvin Murphy	List: Jonathon Simmons (co-captain) Kevin Murphy (co-captain) Isaiah Austin Adam Drexler Vance Jackson	Houston	2025
LA Riot	Nick Young	List: Dwight Howard (captain) Jordan Crawford (co-captain) Kosta Koufos (co-captain) Brandon McCoy Chris Allen Patrick McCaw	Los Angeles	2025
Miami 305	Michael Cooper	List: Mario Chalmers (captain) Michael Beasley (co-captain) Reggie Evans (co-captain) Lance Stephenson Sean Williams Joey Dorsey	Miami	2025

== Regular season ==
In 2017 and 2018, teams competed in an eight-game, eight-week regular season from late-June through mid-August. Each week, a different city hosted four games in which all eight teams would compete. Teams faced each other at least once during the regular season, with a rematch of the week one games occurring in week eight. The four teams with the best record at the end of the regular season qualified for the semifinals.

In 2019, the league expanded to 12 teams and visits two cities each week, playing three games in each city.

The 2020 Big3 season was cancelled due to the COVID-19 pandemic.

In 2021, the first three weekends and the last two Saturdays of play were held in Las Vegas, with games also played in Dallas, Milwaukee and Chicago.

In 2022, the regular season was held in Chicago and Dallas.

In 2023, the regular season was held once a week in Chicago, Dallas, Brooklyn, Memphis, Miami, Boston, Charlotte and Detroit.

== Playoffs ==
In 2017–2019, the league featured a two-week post-season in August which included a semifinals round and a championship game. Winners of the championship are awarded the Julius Erving Championship Trophy. In addition to the playoff tournament, both weeks featured games (including a consolation game) consisting solely of teams which had been eliminated from championship contention; the results of these games determined those team's final rankings.

In 2021, the championship round was held in the Bahamas in early September.

In 2022, the 2017–2019 format was used but did not feature a 3rd place game.

== Championships ==
Year	Location	Winner	Players	Coach	Runner-up	Players	Coach
2017	MGM Grand Garden Arena; Las Vegas, NV	Trilogy	List: 3 Al Harrington; 4 Kenyon Martin; 8 James White; 22 Dion Glover; 32 Rashad McCants	Rick Mahorn	3 Headed Monsters	List: 7 Mahmoud Abdul-Rauf; 9 Rashard Lewis (MVP); 13 Eddie Basden; 54 Kwame Brown; 55 Jason Williams	Gary Payton
2018	Barclays Center; Brooklyn, NY	Power	List: 0 Glen Davis; 3 Quentin Richardson; 5 Cuttino Mobley; 11 Chris Andersen; 13 Jerome Williams; 50 Corey Maggette (MVP)	Nancy Lieberman	3's Company	List: 0 Drew Gooden; 1 DerMarr Johnson; 2 Andre Emmett; 5 Baron Davis; 30 Dahntay Jones; 54 Jason Maxiell	Michael Cooper
2019	Staples Center; Los Angeles, CA	Triplets	List: 1 Joe Johnson (MVP); 2 Jannero Pargo; 5 Sergerio Gipson; 6 Alan Anderson; 8 Jamario Moon; 25 Al Jefferson	Lisa Leslie	Killer 3's	List: 5 Stephen Jackson; 6 Franklin Session; 20 Donté Greene; 21 Josh Powell; 32 C.J. Watson; 34 Eddy Curry	Charles Oakley
2020	Season cancelled due to the COVID-19 pandemic in the United States						
2021	Imperial Arena; The Bahamas	Trilogy	List: 3 Jarrett Jack; 8 James White; 15 Amir Johnson; 13 Isaiah Briscoe; 6 Devin Sweetney	Stephen Jackson	3 Headed Monsters	List: 9 Rashard Lewis; 7 Mahmoud Abdul-Rauf; 30 Reggie Evans; 55 Kevin Murphy; 34 Mamadou N'Diaye	Gary Payton
2022	State Farm Arena; Atlanta, GA	Trilogy	List: 8 James White; 5 Earl Clark; 15 Amir Johnson; 13 Isaiah Briscoe; 34 David Hawkins	Stephen Jackson	Power	List: 5 Cuttino Mobley; 9 Nikoloz Tskitishvili; 30 Royce White; 41 Glen Rice Jr.; 6 T.J. Cline	Nancy Lieberman
2023	The O2 Arena; London	Enemies	List: 1 Nick Young; 44 Elijah Stewart; 21 Isaiah Austin; 27 Jordan Crawford; 30 Quincy Miller	Nick Young	Triplets	List: 1 Joe Johnson; 11 Jeremy Pargo; 2 Jannero Pargo; 15 Jamario Moon; 8 Larry Sanders	Lisa Leslie
2024	TD Garden; Boston, MA	Bivouac	List: 14 Gerald Green; 13 Corey Brewer; 22 Garlon Green; 5 Jaylen Johnson; 32 Javier Carter	Gary Payton	3's Company	List: 15 Mario Chalmers; 11 Michael Beasley; 30 Reggie Evans; 5 Nasir Core; 51 Sean Williams	Michael Cooper
2025	Addition Financial Arena; Orlando, FL	Miami 305	List: 15 Mario Chalmers; 11 Michael Beasley; 30 Reggie Evans; 1 Lance Stephenson; 51 Sean Williams	Michael Cooper	Chicago Triplets	List: 5 Montrezl Harrell; 8 Nasir Core; 3 Chris Allen; 1 Brandon Moss; 0 Amir Johnson	Julius Erving
2026	Spectrum Center; Charlotte, NC	Boston Ball Hogs	List: 2 Jeremy Pargo; 23 Deshawn Stephens; 22 Garlon Green; 7 Raymond Nixon; 30 Quincy Miller	Gary Payton	Dallas Power	List: 15 Greg Monroe; 41 Glen Rice Jr.; 22 Cameron Smith; 44 Elijah Stewart; 6 T.J. Cline	Nancy Lieberman

== Trophies and awards ==
=== Julius Erving Championship Trophy ===
The Trilogy took home the Big3's inaugural championship trophy in 2017. In 2018, the league's trophy was named in honor of Basketball Hall of Fame inductee (and current Tri-state head coach) Julius Erving. The Power were awarded the trophy in 2018. The Triplets were awarded the trophy in 2019. The Trilogy were awarded their second & third trophy in 2021 & 2022. The Enemies were awarded the trophy in 2023 and Bivouac were awarded the trophy for the first time in 2024.

=== Player and coach awards ===
Annually, players in the Big3 are given an opportunity to nominate and vote for fellow players and coaches in several awards categories. The results of the Big3's awards are announced shortly before the championship game. Award categories include Most Valuable Player, Coach of the Year, 4th Man, and Defensive Player of the Year, among others.

== Broadcasting ==
For the 2017 season, Fox Sports 1 carried the eight weeks of the regular season and the playoffs on tape delay, while Fox broadcast the championship game live. Gus Johnson was the regular play-by-play announcer, though Brian Custer filled-in occasionally, Jim Jackson handled color commentary and Michael Rapaport was the sideline reporter.

In 2018, all games were broadcast live on Friday nights, with four weeks of games (including the semifinals and championship) on Fox, with the remaining weeks airing on FS1. For 2018, Custer was promoted to be the regular play-by-play announcer while Jackson and Rapaport returned.

On April 4, 2019, Big3 announced a new broadcast deal with CBS Sports, under which coverage moved to CBS and CBS Sports Network. In June 2021, Big3 announced a digital media partnership with the video sharing app Triller and FITE TV. This includes 30 hours of live game coverage to stream at no charge within the app (including exclusive coverage of an all-star game), and figures such as Ice Cube and players maintaining presences.

For the 2022 season the league remained with broadcast partner CBS to air 28 hours of coverage in the US while DAZN, Vyre Network and the Big 3 YouTube channel broadcast 29 hours in the US and all coverage internationally.

For 2023, Big3 launched Big3tv to stream all its games on its own website internationally and all games not televised on CBS in the United States.

For 2024, Big3 would stream non-CBS games on their official X account in the United States.

For the 2025 season, Big3 announced that Vice TV had acquired the rights to air 14 games. CBS Sports will produce the games.

For the 2026 season, Big3 announced that BET would re-air games that conclude on CBS's broadcast window on the following Monday in primetime. They also announced that Fubo Sports Network would air 16 games.

== Notable people ==
=== Commissioners ===
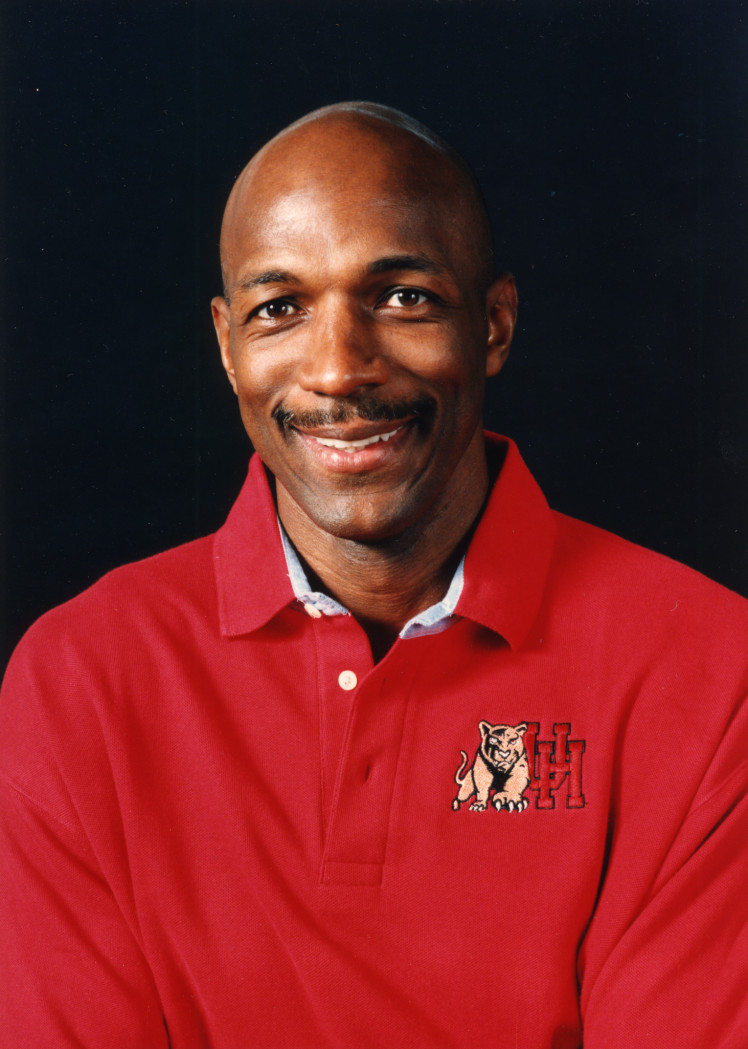
Clyde Drexler, the BIG3 Commissioner since 2018

- Roger Mason Jr., President & Commissioner from 2017 to 2018
- Clyde Drexler, Commissioner from 2018 to present

=== Players ===
- List of BIG3 players
