= Lee Nailon =

American basketball player (born 1975)

Personal information
- Born: February 22, 1975 (age 51) South Bend, Indiana, U. S.
- Listed height: 6 ft 9 in (2.06 m)
- Listed weight: 240 lb (109 kg)

Career information
- High school: Clay (South Bend, Indiana)
- College: Southeastern Iowa CC (1995–1996); Butler CC (1996–1997); TCU (1997–1999)
- NBA draft: 1999: 2nd round, 43rd overall pick
- Drafted by: Charlotte Hornets
- Playing career: 1999–2014
- Position: Power forward / small forward
- Number: 54, 4, 33

Career history
- 1999–2000: Adecco Milano
- 2000–2002: Charlotte Hornets
- 2002–2003: New York Knicks
- 2003: Atlanta Hawks
- 2004: Orlando Magic
- 2004: Gary Steelheads
- 2004: Cleveland Cavaliers
- 2004–2005: New Orleans Hornets
- 2005–2006: Philadelphia 76ers
- 2006–2007: Bnei HaSharon
- 2007–2008: Lokomotiv Novosibirsk
- 2008–2009: Sporting Al Riyadi Beirut
- 2009: Leones de Ponce
- 2010: Piratas de Quebradillas
- 2010–2011: Bnei HaSharon
- 2011: Atomerőmű SE
- 2012: Panteras de Aguascalientes
- 2012: Goyang Orions
- 2012–2013: Estudiantes de Bahía Blanca
- 2013–2014: Panteras de Aguascalientes

Career highlights
- Israeli League MVP (2007); Israeli League Top Scorer (2011); Third-team All-American – AP, USBWA, NABC (1998); WAC Player of the Year (1998); 2× First-team All-WAC (1998, 1999)

Career NBA statistics
- Points: 2,622 (8.6 ppg)
- Rebounds: 936 (3.1 rpg)
- Assists: 298 (1.0 apg)
- Stats at NBA.com
- Stats at Basketball Reference

Lee Nailon (born February 22, 1975) is an American professional basketball player who played six seasons in the National Basketball Association (NBA). He was the 2007 Israeli Basketball Premier League MVP. In 2011, he was the top scorer in the Israel Basketball Premier League. He had an All-American college career at Texas Christian University. In 2022, Lee Nailon became the head basketball coach for Carbondale Community High School in Carbondale, Illinois.

== High school career ==
Nailon was a graduate of South Bend Clay High School where, along with sophomore and former Purdue player, Jaraan Cornell, the two led the Colonials to capture the 1994 Indiana State Championship title, scoring a combined 46 points.

== College career ==
Nailon started his college career playing one year at Southeastern CC (Iowa) before transferring to Butler County CC (Kansas) for his sophomore year then finishing his career playing his final two years (1997–1999) at Texas Christian University where he averaged 23.9 points and 9.1 rebounds, earning first-team WAC All-Conference honors both seasons.

== Professional career ==
Nailon was a second round (43rd overall) pick of the Charlotte Hornets in the 1999 NBA draft. He has played for the Hornets (in separate stints for both Charlotte and New Orleans franchises in 2000 to 2002 and 2004–05 respectively), the New York Knicks (2002–03), Atlanta Hawks (2003–04), Orlando Magic (2003–04), Cleveland Cavaliers (2003–04) and Philadelphia 76ers (2005–06). Nailon feuded with coach Paul Silas while at Charlotte over minutes played which led to him being released and leaving for the Knicks. Nailon got into multiple confrontations with Silas during a preseason game in 2002 which led to his dismissal. Nailon was recommended to play for the Knicks in a phone call then coach Don Chaney made to Silas. While playing for the Knicks Nailon was frustrated over lack of playing time. He holds NBA career averages of 8.6 points and 3.1 rebounds per game. His international experience includes playing for Adecco Milano in Italy (1999–2000), Bnei HaSharon in Israel (2006–07; 2010–11), Lokomotiv Novosibirsk in Russia (2007–08), Al-Riyadi in Lebanon, Leones de Ponce (2009) and Piratas de Quebradillas in Puerto Rico (2010).

In the 2006–07 season, Nailon led Bnei HaSharon to the Israeli Cup final, shocking the champions, Maccabi Tel Aviv, in the semifinal (eventually losing to Hapoel Jerusalem in the final). He was named the 2007 Israeli Basketball Premier League MVP.

Nailon re-signed with Bnei HaSharon on August 1, 2010. In 2011, he was the top scorer in the Israel Basketball Premier League.

In 2018, Nailon was drafted 6th overall by the Ghost Ballers of the United States–based BIG3.

== Career statistics ==
Legend
GP	Games played	GS	Games started	MPG	Minutes per game
FG%	Field goal percentage	3P%	3-point field goal percentage	FT%	Free throw percentage
RPG	Rebounds per game	APG	Assists per game	SPG	Steals per game
BPG	Blocks per game	PPG	Points per game	**Bold**	Career high

=== NBA ===
==== Regular season ====
Year	Team	GP	GS	MPG	FG%	3P%	FT%	RPG	APG	SPG	BPG	PPG
2000-01	Charlotte	42	0	11.2	.485	.000	.744	2.2	.6	.21	.12	3.9
2001-02	Charlotte	**79**	41	24.2	.483	**.500**	.747	3.7	1.2	**.75**	.22	10.8
2002-03	New York	38	0	10.7	.442	.000	.824	1.8	.7	.16	.08	5.5
2003-04	Atlanta	27	0	11.1	.457	.000	.842	2.3	.6	.37	**.26**	5.3
2003-04	Orlando	8	0	10.4	.407	.000	.778	1.8	.5	.13	.00	3.6
2003-04	Cleveland	22	4	18.0	.451	.000	.800	3.0	.8	.18	.05	7.7
2004-05	New Orleans	68	**51**	**29.7**	.478	.000	.806	**4.4**	**1.6**	.53	.24	**14.2**
2005-06	Philadelphia	22	0	10.8	**.500**	.000	**.867**	1.9	.3	.36	.18	4.2
Career		306	96	19.0	.474	.111	.786	3.1	1.0	.43	.10	8.6

==== Playoffs ====
Year	Team	GP	GS	MPG	FG%	3P%	FT%	RPG	APG	SPG	BPG	PPG
2002	Charlotte	9	1	17.8	.458	.000	.789	2.7	.7	.3	.0	7.7
