= Ghost Ballers =

- Leagues: BIG3
- Founded: 22 February 2017; 9 years ago
- Location: United States
- Team colors: Purple, white, black, grey
- Head coach: George Gervin
- Website: big3.com/index.php/team-captains/mike-bibby

The Ghost Ballers are an American men's 3-on-3 basketball team that plays in the BIG3.

== 2017 ==
=== Draft ===
| Pick | Player | NBA experience | Last club |
|---|---|---|---|
| 8 | Maurice Evans | 9 years | (United States) Washington Wizards |
| 9 | Marcus Banks | 8 years | (France) SLUC Nancy Basket |
| 22 | Ivan Johnson | 2 years | (Dominican Republic) Reales de La Vega |

== 2018 ==
=== Draft ===
| Pick | Player | NBA experience | Last club |
|---|---|---|---|
| 6 | Lee Nailon | 6 years | (Mexico) Panteras de Aguascalientes |
| 13 | Marcus Banks | 8 years | (France) SLUC Nancy Basket |
| 19 | Mario West | 4 years | (Argentina) Juventud Sionista |

== Current roster ==
2017 Ghost Ballers roster
Players

| Pos. | No. | Player | Height | Weight | DOB | From |
|---|---|---|---|---|---|---|
| PG | 3 | Marcus Banks | 6 ft 2 in (1.88 m) | 225 lb (102 kg) | 1981-11-19 | UNLV |
| PG | 10 | Mike Bibby (C) | 6 ft 2 in (1.88 m) | 195 lb (88 kg) | 1978-05-13 | Arizona |
| G/F | 31 | Ricky Davis (CC) | 6 ft 7 in (2.01 m) | 195 lb (88 kg) | 1979-09-23 | Iowa |
| F | - | Lee Nailon | 6 ft 9 in (2.06 m) | 240 lb (109 kg) | 1975-02-22 | TCU |
| SG | - | Mario West | 6 ft 5 in (1.96 m) | 210 lb (95 kg) | 1984-06-19 | Georgia Tech |
| PF | - | Ivan Johnson | 6 ft 8 in (2.03 m) | 255 lb (116 kg) | 1984-04-10 | Cal State San Bernardino |

Coaches
Head coach
- George Gervin

Legend
- (DP) Unsigned draft pick
- (FA) Free agent
- (S) Suspended
- (CC) Team co-captain
- Injured

Roster
Updated: 2018-06-23

== Head coaches ==
| Years Active | Name | BIG3 Championships |
|---|---|---|
| 2017-2024 | George Gervin | 0 |
