= Robert Hite =

American basketball player (born 1984)

Personal information
- Born: January 12, 1984 (age 42) Cincinnati, Ohio, U.S.
- Listed height: 6 ft 2 in (1.88 m)
- Listed weight: 184 lb (83 kg)

Career information
- High school: Winton Woods (Cincinnati, Ohio)
- College: Miami (2002–2006)
- NBA draft: 2006: undrafted
- Playing career: 2006–2014
- Position: Shooting guard
- Number: 22

Career history
- 2006–2007: Miami Heat
- 2007: Sioux Falls Skyforce
- 2007–2008: Galatasaray Café Crown
- 2008: TAU Cerámica
- 2008–2009: Base Oostende
- 2009–2010: Sigma Coatings Montegranaro
- 2010: JuveCaserta Basket
- 2010: Pallacanestro Reggiana
- 2010–2011: Hapoel Holon
- 2011: CSP Limoges
- 2011: Cholet Basket
- 2011–2012: Biancoblù Basket Bologna
- 2013: Iowa Energy
- 2013–2014: Canton Charge

Career highlights
- Third-team All-ACC (2006)
- Stats at NBA.com
- Stats at Basketball Reference

Robert J. Hite II (born January 12, 1984) is an American former professional basketball player. He played briefly for the Miami Heat in the National Basketball Association (NBA), as well as in the NBA G League and in the top leagues of Turkey, Spain, Belgium, France and Israel.

== College career ==
Hite, at 6'2" and 184 lbs., played four seasons at the University of Miami appearing in 121 games (109 starts) and averaged 14.2 points, 4.6 rebounds, 1.55 steals and 1.5 assists. He finished fifth on Miami's career scoring list with 1,717 points, fourth on UM's career steals list with 187 and third in three-point field goals made with 228. His 84.9 career shooting percentage from the free throw line ranks second in school history while his 38.4 shooting percentage from three-point range ranks third all-time. His 109 career starts also rank second on Miami's all-time list.

As a senior, he led Miami in steals (50) while ranking second on the team in scoring (558) and rebounding (198). Hite was a third-team All-ACC selection and named to the All-District 6 first-team by the National Association of Basketball Coaches (NABC) after starting all 34 games, averaging 16.4 points, 5.8 rebounds, 1.47 steals and 1.4 assists while connecting on 85 three-point field goals, setting a new UM single-season record. As a junior, he appeared in all 29 games (28 starts) and averaged 17.3 points, 5.0 rebounds, 1.55 steals and 1.1 assists. Hite was an Honorable-mention All-ACC selection and earned Player of the Week honors on December 13. As a sophomore, he appeared in all 30 games (29 starts) and averaged 15.2 points, 3.6 rebounds, 2.03 steals and 2.0 assists. He was named Big East Player of the Week on Dec 29th and was also named to the All-Tournament team at the 2003 Las Vegas Tourney. As a freshman, he appeared in all 28 games (18 starts) and averaged 7.3 points, 3.6 rebounds, 1.4 assists and 1.11 steals. He ranked third on the team in scoring and became the first University of Miami freshman since 1992 to open the season with four consecutive double-figure scoring games.

== Professional career ==
After going undrafted in the 2006 NBA draft, he joined the Miami Heat for the 2007 NBA Summer League. In August 2006, he signed a multi-year deal with the Heat. Hite played his first NBA game in the Heat's season opener against the Chicago Bulls on October 31, 2006. He went 0–3 from the field to go scoreless in 5 minutes with 1 rebound and 1 steal. Hite's best game came against the San Antonio Spurs on November 22, 2006. He scored 9 points on 4–6 shooting and went 1–1 from the three-point line. He also had a rebound, assist, steal, and block without a turnover or foul in 17 minutes.

On February 1, 2007, Hite was charged with DUI after a party celebrating teammate Dwyane Wade's 25th birthday. It was later dropped when tests showed Hite's blood alcohol level was well within legal limits. On that same day, he was waived by the Heat. Later that month, Hite was acquired by the Sioux Falls Skyforce.

He joined the New Jersey Nets for the 2007 NBA Summer League. In August 2007, he signed with the Nets. However, he was later waived on October 28, 2007. He later joined Galatasaray Café Crown of Turkey for the 2007–08 season.

On September 26, 2008, he signed with the Phoenix Suns. However, he was later waived on October 23. In November 2008, he joined TAU Cerámica of Spain. In December 2008, he joined Base Oostende of Belgium.

He joined the Cleveland Cavaliers for the 2009 NBA Summer League. In July 2009, he signed with Sigma Coatings Montegranaro of Italy. In January 2010, he left Montegranaro and joined JuveCaserta Basket. In March 2010, he left Caserta and joined Pallacanestro Reggiana for the rest of the 2009–10 season.

In September 2010, Hite signed with Hapoel Holon of Israel. In February 2011, he left Hapoel and signed with CSP Limoges of France for the rest of the 2010–11 season.

In June 2011, he signed a one-year contract with Cholet Basket of France. In September 2011, he sustained an injury and was inactive for two months. In December 2011, he was released by Cholet and signed with Biancoblù Basket Bologna of Italy. Unfortunately, after just three games, he was injured again and in April 2012, he was informed he would need to undergo surgery on his Achilles tendon.

On January 26, 2013, Hite was acquired by the Iowa Energy of the NBA Development League.

On November 1, 2013, Hite was reacquired by the Iowa Energy. On the same day, he was traded to the Canton Charge.
