= Eric Mullins =

American football player (born 1962)

No. 80
- Position: Wide receiver

Personal information
- Born: July 30, 1962 (age 64); Houston, Texas, U.S.
- Listed height: 5 ft 11 in (1.80 m)
- Listed weight: 181 lb (82 kg)

Career information
- High school: Strake Jesuit College Preparatory (Houston)
- College: Stanford
- NFL draft: 1984: 6th round, 161st overall pick

Career history
- Houston Oilers (1984); San Francisco 49ers (1986)*; San Diego Chargers (1987)*
- * Offseason or practice squad member only

Career NFL statistics
- Receptions: 6
- Receiving yards: 85
- Touchdowns: 1
- Stats at Pro Football Reference

Eric Mullins (born July 30, 1962) is an American former professional football player who was a wide receiver for the Houston Oilers of the National Football League (NFL) in 1984. He played college football for the Stanford Cardinal.
