= 3's Company =

- Leagues: BIG3
- Founded: 8 March 2017; 9 years ago
- Location: United States
- Team colors: Dark blue, orange, white
- Head coach: Michael Cooper
- Website: big3.com/teams/3s-company

3's Company is an American men's 3-on-3 basketball team that plays in the BIG3.

== 2017 ==
=== Draft ===
Pick	Player	NBA experience	Last club
2	Andre Owens	2 years	(Austria) BC Hallmann Vienna
15	Mike Sweetney	4 years	(Uruguay) Urunday Universitario
21	Ruben Patterson	10 years	(Lebanon) Champville SC

== 2018 ==
=== Draft ===
Pick	Player	NBA experience	Last club
2	Andre Emmett	2 years	(South Korea) Jeonju KCC Egis
8	Jason Maxiell	10 years	(United States) Detroit Pistons
15	Derrick Byars	2 years	(United States) Delaware 87ers

== Current roster ==
3's Company roster
Players
Coaches

Pos.	No.	Nat.	Name	Ht.	Wt.	Age
PG	15	(United States)	Chalmers, Mario (CC)	1.88 m (6 ft 2 in)	86 kg (190 lb)	40 – 19 May 1986
PF	0	(United States)	Gooden, Drew (CC)	2.08 m (6 ft 10 in)	113 kg (249 lb)	44 – 24 September 1981
G/F	34	(United States)	Hawkins, David	1.95 m (6 ft 5 in)	102 kg (225 lb)	43 – 28 October 1982
F/C	5	(United States)	Hollins, Ryan	2.13 m (7 ft 0 in)	109 kg (240 lb)	41 – 10 October 1984
G/F	1	(United States)	Johnson, DerMarr (C)	2.06 m (6 ft 9 in)	91 kg (201 lb)	46 – 5 May 1980
C	21	(United States)	Onuaku, Arinze	2.06 m (6 ft 9 in)	125 kg (276 lb)	38 – 13 July 1987
PG	2	(United States)	Pargo, Jeremy	1.88 m (6 ft 2 in)	96 kg (212 lb)	40 – 17 March 1986

Head coach

- Michael Cooper

Legend

- (C) Team captain
- (CC) Team co-captain
- Injured

- Roster

== Head coaches ==
Years Active	Name	BIG3 Championships
2017	Allen Iverson	0
2018-2024	Michael Cooper	0
