= 1998 McDonald's All-American Boys Game =

American high school basketball game

| East | West |
|---|---|
| 128 | 112 |
| | 1st half | 2nd half | Total |
|---|---|---|---|
| East | 54 | 74 | 128 |
| West | 57 | 55 | 112 |
- Date: March 25, 1998
- Venue: Norfolk Scope, Norfolk, VA
- MVP: Ronald Curry
- Referees: 1; 2; 3
- Attendance: 10,253
- Network: ESPN

McDonald's All-American

The 1998 McDonald's All-American Boys Game was an All-star basketball game played on Wednesday, March 25, 1998, at the Norfolk Scope in Norfolk, Virginia. The game's rosters featured the best and most highly recruited high school boys graduating in 1998. The game was the 21st annual version of the McDonald's All-American Game first played in 1978.

== 1998 game ==
The game was telecast live by ESPN for the first time (CBS was the previous telecaster). Korleone Young participated in the dunk contest but a preexisting injury prevented him from playing in the game. The game saw many dunks, something usual for all-star games, and several 3-point shots. The first 2 points were scored by Kris Lang from an alley oop pass by Teddy Dupay. The West led at halftime, but the East completed the comeback thanks to Jason Capel (16 points in the second half) and game MVP Ronald Curry who almost recorded a triple-double with 19 points, 13 rebounds and 9 assists. Other players who starred were JaRon Rush, Quentin Richardson (both had 19 points); Al Harrington and Rashard Lewis (17 points); and Erick Barkley (12 assists). Of the 24 players, 14 went on to play at least 1 game in the NBA. Three of them declared for the 1998 NBA draft and were drafted out of high school: Al Harrington (25th overall), Rashard Lewis (32nd overall) and Korleone Young (40th overall).

=== East roster ===
| No. | Name | Height | Weight | Position | Hometown | High school | College of Choice |
|---|---|---|---|---|---|---|---|
| 00 | Kris Lang | 6-10 | 220 | F | Gastonia, NC, U.S. | Hunter Huss | North Carolina |
| 12 | Dane Fife | 6-4 | 185 | G | Clarkston, MI, U.S. | Clarkston | Indiana |
| 13 | Mike Miller | 6-8 | 210 | F | Mitchell, SD, U.S. | Mitchell | Florida |
| 20 | Frank Williams | 6-4 | 200 | G | Peoria, IL, U.S. | Manual | Illinois |
| 22 | Ronald Curry | 6-2 | 190 | G | Hampton, VA, U.S. | Hampton | North Carolina |
| 23 | Vincent Yarbrough | 6-7 | 200 | F | Cleveland, TN, U.S. | Cleveland | Tennessee |
| 24 | Teddy Dupay | 5-10 | 175 | G | Cape Coral, FL, U.S. | Mariner | Florida |
| 25 | Jason Capel | 6-8 | 215 | F | Frederick, MD, U.S. | St. John's at Prospect Hall | North Carolina |
| 42 | Al Harrington | 6-9 | 235 | F | Elizabeth, NJ, U.S. | St. Patrick | Undecided (Did not attend) |
| 43 | Kevin Lyde | 6-9 | 250 | C | Mouth of Wilson, VA, U.S. | Oak Hill Academy | Temple |
| 44 | Danny Miller | 6-7 | 210 | G | Mount Holly, NJ, U.S. | Rancocas Valley | Maryland |
| 50 | Dan Gadzuric | 6-11 | 245 | C | Byfield, MA, U.S. | Governor Dummer Academy | Undecided; Committed later to UCLA. |

=== West roster ===
| No. | Name | Height | Weight | Position | Hometown | High school | College of Choice |
|---|---|---|---|---|---|---|---|
| 00 | Stromile Swift | 6-8 | 210 | C | Shreveport, LA, U.S. | Fair Park | Undecided; Committed later to LSU. |
| 4 | JaRon Rush | 6-7 | 215 | F | Kansas City, MO, U.S. | Pembroke Hill | UCLA |
| 5 | Jeff Boschee | 6-1 | 175 | G | Valley City, ND, U.S. | Valley City | Kansas |
| 10 | Erick Barkley | 6-1 | 170 | G | Pittsfield, ME, U.S. | Maine Central Institute | St. John's |
| 21 | Tayshaun Prince | 6-8 | 190 | G | Compton, CA, U.S. | Dominguez | Kentucky |
| 34 | Quentin Richardson | 6-6 | 225 | F | Chicago, IL, U.S. | Whitney Young | DePaul |
| 35 | Ray Young | 6-4 | 200 | G | Alameda, CA, U.S. | St. Joseph Notre Dame | UCLA |
| 42 | Korleone Young | 6-8 | 220 | F | Chatham, VA, U.S. | Hargrave Military Academy | Undecided (Did not attend) |
| 43 | Rashard Lewis | 6-10 | 215 | F | Houston, TX, U.S. | Alief Elsik | Undecided (Did not attend) |
| 44 | Richard Jefferson | 6-7 | 215 | F | Phoenix, AZ, U.S. | Moon Valley | Arizona |
| 50 | Corey Maggette | 6-6 | 210 | F | Oak Park, IL, U.S. | Fenwick | Duke |
| 55 | Joel Przybilla | 7-1 | 235 | C | Monticello, MN, U.S. | Monticello | Minnesota |

=== Coaches ===
The East team was coached by:

- Head Coach Bill Littlepage of Hopewell High School (Hopewell, Virginia)
- Asst Coach William Simon of Hopewell High School (Hopewell, Virginia)

The West team was coached by:

- Head Coach Rudy Carey of East High School (Denver, Colorado)
- Asst Coach Mark Perlmutter of East High School (Denver, Colorado)

== All-American Week ==
=== Contest winners ===
- The 1998 Slam Dunk contest was won by Ronald Curry.
- The 1998 3-point shoot-out was won by Teddy Dupay.
