= Curtis Walker =

Curtis Walker may refer to:

- Curtis Walker (actor)
- Curtis Walker (American football)

== See also ==
- Curt Walker, American baseball player
