= Bobby Phillips (basketball) =

American basketball player

Personal information
- Born: 1975 (age 50–51) Salisbury, North Carolina, U.S.
- Listed height: 6 ft 6 in (1.98 m)
- Listed weight: 215 lb (98 kg)

Career information
- High school: Salisbury (Salisbury, North Carolina)
- College: Western Nebraska CC (1994–1996); Western Carolina (1996–1998)
- NBA draft: 1998: undrafted
- Position: Small forward

Career highlights
- SoCon co-Player of the Year (1998); First Team All-SoCon (1998); Second Team All-SoCon (1997)

Robert "Bobby" Phillips (born 1975) is an American former professional basketball player. Although he played professionally in leagues in both Belgium and Austria, he is better known for his two-year collegiate career at Western Carolina University in 1996–97 and 1997–98.

== Playing career ==
Phillips grew up in Salisbury, North Carolina and attended Salisbury High School. At the time of his graduation he was the third-leading scorer in Rowan County history. In 2012, Phillips was inducted into the Rowan Hall of Fame.

Phillips' collegiate career at Western Carolina was two years long, but he established himself as a key player during his time. In his 1996–97 junior season he averaged 14.1 points and five rebounds per game and was named to the All-Southern Conference (SoCon) Second Team. Twice that season he was named the SoCon Player of the Week. The Catamounts finished second in the conference behind Phillips' play. The next season, Phillips increased his averages to 16.9 points and 6.9 rebounds per game, was named a First Team All-SoCon member, and was named the SoCon co-Player of the Year with Furman's Chuck Vincent.

He was never selected in the 1998 NBA draft, so Phillips headed to Europe to play professionally. In his brief expatriate basketball career he played in Belgium and Austria.

== Post-basketball life ==
Phillips returned to the United States to work in business. He worked for the Sacramento Kings organization as the Director of Group Sales. While working for the Kings, Phillips earned the Maloof Allstar Award, which is the most prestigious award offered at the company. Other careers he held include leading customer service and sales efforts for the WNBA's Atlanta Dream, working for Bank of America, and then for Creagh and Associates. In 2013, he was hired at Sams & Associates, an independent insurance adjusting firm serving the western United States.
