= Curtis Walker (American football) =

American football coach (born c. 1971)

Biographical details
- Born: c. 1971 (age 54–55); Burlington, North Carolina, U.S.
- Education: Catawba College (1992)

Playing career
- 1989–1992: Catawba
- Position: Linebacker

Coaching career (HC unless noted)
- 1993–1994: Salisbury HS (NC) (assistant)
- 1995–2000: Catawba (LB)
- 2001: Catawba (DC/LB)
- 2002–2011: Coastal Carolina (DC/LB)
- 2012: Western Carolina (DC/LB)
- 2013–2022: Catawba
- 2023: North Charleston HS (SC)

Administrative career (AD unless noted)
- 2023–2024: North Charleston HS (SC)

Head coaching record
- Overall: 46–54 (college); 4–7 (high school)
- Tournaments: 0–1 (NCAA D-II playoffs)

Accomplishments and honors

Championships
- 1 SAC (2015)

Curtis Walker (born c. 1971) is an American former college football coach. He was the head football coach for Catawba College from 2013 to 2022 and North Charleston High School in 2023. He also coached for Salisbury High School, Coastal Carolina, and Western Carolina. He played college football for Catawba as a linebacker.

== Personal life ==
Walker's son, Jalon Walker, was an All-American linebacker for Georgia who was drafted 15th overall in the first round of the 2025 NFL draft to the Atlanta Falcons.

== Head coaching record ==
=== College ===
Year	Team	Overall	Conference	Standing	Bowl/playoffs	AFCA^{#}
Catawba Indians (South Atlantic Conference) (2013–2022)
2013	Catawba	6–5	3–4	T–4th		
2014	Catawba	6–5	3–4	T–4th		
2015	Catawba	9–3	6–1	1st	L NCAA Division II First Round	25
2016	Catawba	5–6	5–2	T–2nd		
2017	Catawba	9–2	5–2	T–2nd		
2018	Catawba	4–7	2–5	7th		
2019	Catawba	1–10	0–8	9th		
2020–21	Catawba	0–2	0–2	4th (Piedmont)		
2021	Catawba	5–4	2–6	7th		
2022	Catawba	1–10	0–9	6th (Piedmont)		
Catawba:		46–54	26–43			
Total:		46–54				
National championship Conference title Conference division title or championship game berth

=== High school ===
Year	Team	Overall	Conference	Standing	Bowl/playoffs
North Charleston Cougars () (2023)
2023	North Charleston	4–7	1–3	4th	
North Charleston:		4–7	1–3		
Total:		4–7			
