= 2013 NBA Finals =

2013 basketball championship series

Team	Coach	Wins
Miami Heat	Erik Spoelstra	4
San Antonio Spurs	Gregg Popovich	3
- Dates: June 6–20
- MVP: LeBron James (Miami Heat)
- Hall of Famers: Heat: Ray Allen (2018); Chris Bosh (2021); Dwyane Wade (2023); Spurs: Tim Duncan (2020); Manu Ginóbili (2022); Tracy McGrady (2017); Tony Parker (2023); Coaches: Gregg Popovich (2023); Officials: Danny Crawford (2025)
- Eastern finals: Heat defeated Pacers, 4–3
- Western finals: Spurs defeated Grizzlies, 4–0

The 2013 NBA Finals was the championship series of the National Basketball Association's (NBA) 2012–13 season and conclusion of the season's playoffs, played from June 6 to 20, 2013. In this best-of-seven series, the defending champion and Eastern Conference champion Miami Heat, who were favored to win the series defeated the Western Conference champion San Antonio Spurs in seven games to win their second consecutive championship and third overall in franchise history, giving the Spurs their first Finals loss in franchise history. The Heat's LeBron James was voted the NBA Finals Most Valuable Player (MVP) for the second straight year, after averaging 25.3 points, 10.9 rebounds, and 7.0 assists.

The series began on June 6 and concluded on June 20. With a league-best regular season record of 66–16, the Heat had home-court advantage in the Finals. The Heat's late rally in Games 6 and 7, which also included Ray Allen's clutch 3-pointer in Game 6 to force overtime, has made it one of the greatest Finals of all time. Four former NBA Finals MVPs played in the series (the Spurs' Tim Duncan and Tony Parker, and the Heat's Dwyane Wade and LeBron James), the most since 1987. The 2013 Finals also set a record for most international players on either Finals roster (10). This was the last NBA Finals series to use the 2–3–2 format, which was introduced in 1985, with the format changed to 2–2–1–1–1 starting in 2014.

The 2013 edition of the NBA Finals has been cited as one of the best ever.

== Background ==
LeBron James and Tim Duncan previously faced off in the 2007 NBA Finals, when James was with the Cleveland Cavaliers, which saw the Spurs sweep the Cavaliers in four games, giving San Antonio their fourth NBA title. After the deciding game, Duncan sought out James in the locker room to praise him for a great series and told James that the league would be his someday.

In 2010, Spurs president of basketball and head coach Gregg Popovich made a congratulatory phone call to Heat president Pat Riley for signing LeBron James and Chris Bosh to play with Dwyane Wade.

=== San Antonio Spurs ===
This was the San Antonio Spurs' fifth appearance in the NBA Finals, attempting to win their fifth NBA championship in team history. The Spurs finished the regular season with 58 wins, finishing in first place in the Southwest Division and the second overall regular season record among Western Conference teams. They recorded only two losses in the first three rounds of the playoffs: they swept the Los Angeles Lakers in the first round in four games, eliminated the Golden State Warriors in six games in the second round, then swept the Memphis Grizzlies in the Western Conference finals in four games.

=== Miami Heat ===
This was the Miami Heat's fourth appearance in the NBA Finals and the third appearance for three straight years, attempting to win their third NBA championship. The Heat finished with the best regular season record, recording a league leading 66 wins, and first place in the Southeast Division. They swept the Milwaukee Bucks in the first round of the playoffs in four games before eliminating the Chicago Bulls in five games in the second round, winning four straight games in the series. In the Eastern Conference finals, the Heat defeated the Indiana Pacers in seven games.

=== Road to the Finals ===
San Antonio Spurs (Western Conference champion)		Miami Heat (Eastern Conference champion)
Western Conference: # / Team / W / L / PCT / GB / GP; 1 / c-Oklahoma City Thunder * / 60 / 22 / .732 / – / 82; 2 / y-San Antonio Spurs * / 58 / 24 / .707 / 2.0 / 82; 3 / x-Denver Nuggets * / 57 / 25 / .695 / 3.0 / 82; 4 / y-Los Angeles Clippers / 56 / 26 / .683 / 4.0 / 82; 5 / x-Memphis Grizzlies / 56 / 26 / .683 / 4.0 / 82; 6 / x-Golden State Warriors / 47 / 35 / .573 / 13.0 / 82; 7 / x-Los Angeles Lakers / 45 / 37 / .549 / 15.0 / 82; 8 / x-Houston Rockets / 45 / 37 / .549 / 15.0 / 82; 9 / Utah Jazz / 43 / 39 / .524 / 17.0 / 82; 10 / Dallas Mavericks / 41 / 41 / .500 / 19.0 / 82; 11 / Portland Trail Blazers / 33 / 49 / .402 / 27.0 / 82; 12 / Minnesota Timberwolves / 31 / 51 / .378 / 29.0 / 82; 13 / Sacramento Kings / 28 / 54 / .341 / 32.0 / 82; 14 / New Orleans Hornets / 27 / 55 / .329 / 33.0 / 82; 15 / Phoenix Suns / 25 / 57 / .305 / 35.0 / 82; 2nd seed in the West, 3rd best league record	Regular season	Eastern Conference: # / Team / W / L / PCT / GB / GP; 1 / z-Miami Heat * / 66 / 16 / .805 / – / 82; 2 / y-New York Knicks * / 54 / 28 / .659 / 12.0 / 82; 3 / y-Indiana Pacers * / 49 / 32 / .605 / 16.5 / 81; 4 / x-Brooklyn Nets / 49 / 33 / .598 / 17.0 / 82; 5 / x-Chicago Bulls / 45 / 37 / .549 / 21.0 / 82; 6 / x-Atlanta Hawks / 44 / 38 / .537 / 22.0 / 82; 7 / x-Boston Celtics / 41 / 40 / .506 / 24.5 / 81; 8 / x-Milwaukee Bucks / 38 / 44 / .463 / 28.0 / 82; 9 / Philadelphia 76ers / 34 / 48 / .415 / 32.0 / 82; 10 / Toronto Raptors / 34 / 48 / .415 / 32.0 / 82; 11 / Washington Wizards / 29 / 53 / .354 / 37.0 / 82; 12 / Detroit Pistons / 29 / 53 / .354 / 37.0 / 82; 13 / Cleveland Cavaliers / 24 / 58 / .293 / 42.0 / 82; 14 / Charlotte Bobcats / 21 / 61 / .256 / 45.0 / 82; 15 / Orlando Magic / 20 / 62 / .244 / 46.0 / 82; 1st seed in the East, best league record
Defeated the 7th seeded Los Angeles Lakers, 4–0	First round	Defeated the 8th seeded Milwaukee Bucks, 4–0
Defeated the 6th seeded Golden State Warriors, 4–2	Conference semifinals	Defeated the 5th seeded Chicago Bulls, 4–1
Defeated the 5th seeded Memphis Grizzlies, 4–0	Conference finals	Defeated the 3rd seeded Indiana Pacers, 4–3

=== Regular season series ===
The Heat won both games they played against the Spurs during the regular season: 105–100 on November 29, 2012, and 88–86 on March 31, 2013. For the November 29 game at Miami which was nationally televised, Popovich sat out starters Duncan, Tony Parker, Manu Ginóbili, and Danny Green, at the end of a long road trip in order to ensure they had enough rest for the playoffs, as the Spurs had some of the oldest players in the league. NBA commissioner David Stern was outraged when he learned of this and fined the Spurs $250,000 for not informing the Heat, the league or the media in a suitable time-frame that the four players were not making the trip to Miami. Despite the absence of their four starters, the Spurs led the game until the final minute when the Heat came back to win 105–100. The Heat responded somewhat in kind for their trip to San Antonio, as LeBron James, Dwyane Wade, and Mario Chalmers sat out with minor injuries, though those moves were understandable in light of Miami's dominant position for clinching the home-court advantage for the playoffs as well as the end two games earlier of the Heat's record 27-game winning streak. Miami ended up winning anyway thanks to a last-second 3-pointer from the top player they left active for the game, Chris Bosh.

November 29, 2012

Recap

San Antonio Spurs 100, Miami Heat 105

American Airlines Arena, Miami, Florida

March 31, 2013

Recap

Miami Heat 88, San Antonio Spurs 86

AT&T Center, San Antonio, Texas

== Series summary ==
Game	Date	Road team	Result	Home team
Game 1	June 6	San Antonio Spurs	92–88 (1–0)	Miami Heat
Game 2	June 9	San Antonio Spurs	84–103 (1–1)	Miami Heat
Game 3	June 11	Miami Heat	77–113 (1–2)	San Antonio Spurs
Game 4	June 13	Miami Heat	109–93 (2–2)	San Antonio Spurs
Game 5	June 16	Miami Heat	104–114 (2–3)	San Antonio Spurs
Game 6	June 18	San Antonio Spurs	100–103 (OT) (3–3)	Miami Heat
Game 7	June 20	San Antonio Spurs	88–95 (3–4)	Miami Heat

== Game summaries ==
Note: Times are EDT (UTC−4) as listed by the NBA. For games in San Antonio, the local time is also given (CDT, UTC−5).

=== Game 1 ===
ABC

June 6
9:00 pm

Boxscore

San Antonio Spurs 92, Miami Heat 88
Scoring by quarter: 23–24, 26–28, 20–20, 23–16
Pts: Tony Parker 21; Rebs: Tim Duncan 14; Asts: Tony Parker 6	Pts: LeBron James 18; Rebs: LeBron James 18; Asts: LeBron James 10
San Antonio leads series, 1–0

American Airlines Arena, Miami, Florida
Attendance: 19,775
Referees:
- No. 13 Monty McCutchen
- No. 25 Tony Brothers
- No. 23 Jason Phillips

San Antonio won the opener as Tony Parker scored on a bank shot with 5.2 seconds in regulation with the shot clock about to expire. San Antonio scored 23 points in the fourth quarter, while limiting Miami to just 16. Parker led the Spurs with 21 points and 6 assists. The Heat held a 52–49 halftime lead, and LeBron James recorded a triple-double in the game with 18 points, 18 rebounds, and 10 assists. However, Miami's Dwyane Wade, who scored 17 points, was shut out in the final period. Chris Bosh, who recorded 13 points, only scored 2 in the fourth quarter.

=== Game 2 ===
ABC

June 9
8:00 pm

Boxscore

San Antonio Spurs 84, Miami Heat 103
Scoring by quarter: 22–22, 23–28, 20–25, 19–28
Pts: Danny Green 17; Rebs: Kawhi Leonard 14; Asts: Tony Parker 5	Pts: Mario Chalmers 19; Rebs: Chris Bosh 10; Asts: LeBron James 7
Series tied, 1–1

American Airlines Arena, Miami, Florida
Attendance: 19,900
Referees:
- No. 17 Joe Crawford
- No. 14 Ed Malloy
- No. 41 Ken Mauer

Miami evened the series, using a 33–5 run in the final two quarters after the two teams were neck-and-neck late in the third. During that run, James made a highlight-reel block on a dunk attempt by Tiago Splitter early in the fourth quarter. The Heat also made 10 out of 19 three-point shots, and five players had double-digit scoring games: James (17), Mario Chalmers (19), Ray Allen (13), Bosh (12) and Wade (10).

=== Game 3 ===
ABC

June 11
9:00 pm (8:00 pm CDT)

Boxscore

Miami Heat 77, San Antonio Spurs 113
Scoring by quarter: 20–24, 24–26, 19–28, 14–35
Pts: Dwyane Wade 16; Rebs: LeBron James 11; Asts: James, Wade 5 each	Pts: Danny Green 27; Rebs: Tim Duncan 14; Asts: Tony Parker 8
San Antonio leads series, 2–1

AT&T Center, San Antonio, Texas
Attendance: 18,581
Referees:
- No. 43 Danny Crawford
- No. 19 James Capers
- No. 8 Marc Davis

San Antonio bounced back in Game 3, setting the Finals record for most three-pointers in a game (16), and giving the Heat their worst loss in franchise playoff history. The Spurs ensured the game was a blowout by outscoring Miami 35–14 in the fourth quarter after leading 78–63 at the end of the third. Gary Neal had one of the best games of his career, making 6-of-10 three-point shot attempts and finishing with 24 points, and Danny Green led all Spurs players with 27 points while hitting 7-of-9 from behind the arc. The Spurs shined despite a lackluster game from Parker who scored only 6 points before he had to leave the game due to a hamstring injury. For the Heat, Mike Miller made all five of his three-point shots and finished with 15 points on the night, while Wade led the Heat with 16 points. However, James was held to just 7 of 21 shooting from the field, finished with only 15 points, and did not shoot a free throw for the first time in his Miami playoff career. After a strong showing in Game 2, Chalmers was held scoreless with one assist.

=== Game 4 ===
ABC

June 13
9:00 pm (8:00 pm CDT)

Boxscore

Miami Heat 109, San Antonio Spurs 93
Scoring by quarter: 29–26, 20–23, 32–27, 28–17
Pts: LeBron James 33; Rebs: Chris Bosh 13; Asts: Mario Chalmers 5	Pts: Tim Duncan 20; Rebs: Kawhi Leonard 7 Asts: Tony Parker 9
Series tied, 2–2

AT&T Center, San Antonio, Texas
Attendance: 18,581
Referees:
- No. 48 Scott Foster
- No. 24 Mike Callahan
- No. 55 Bill Kennedy

The Heat evened the series again, pulling away from San Antonio in the second half after an even contest at halftime, 49–49. The Heat continued their streak of not losing consecutive games that the team started in January. The Big Three (the trio of James, Wade and Bosh) for Miami finally came together in a big way. James led the Heat with 33 points, while Wade had 32 and Bosh added 20. Tim Duncan led the Spurs with 20 points. Parker started strong with 15 points in the first half, but could not provide the Spurs with any offensive production in the second half.

=== Game 5 ===
ABC

June 16
8:00 pm (7:00 pm CDT)

Boxscore

Miami Heat 104, San Antonio Spurs 114
Scoring by quarter: 19–32, 33–29, 23–26, 29–27
Pts: James, Wade, 25 each Rebs: James, Bosh, 6 each Asts: Dwyane Wade 10	Pts: Tony Parker 26; Rebs: Tim Duncan 12; Asts: Manu Ginóbili 10
San Antonio leads series, 3–2

AT&T Center, San Antonio, Texas
Attendance: 18,581
Referees:
- No. 13 Monty McCutchen
- No. 25 Tony Brothers
- No. 14 Ed Malloy

San Antonio used a marquee shooting performance to down the Heat and take a 3–2 series lead. The Heat trailed the Spurs by double digits for most of the game. Although they finally closed to within one point, 75–74, with 3:05 left in the third quarter, they could not overtake and San Antonio started to pull away after that. Making 42 of 70 shots, San Antonio became the first team to shoot at least 60 percent in an NBA Finals game since the Orlando Magic in Game 3 of the 2009 Finals. Parker led the Spurs with 26 points, while Green scored 24 points, with 6 three-pointers, breaking the all-time record for three-pointers in a Finals series, set by Allen in 2008. Manu Ginóbili, making his first start of the season, had a strong performance with 24 points and 10 assists. Duncan also contributed a double-double (17 points, 12 rebounds), and provided strong defensive support. At one point in the game, Spurs went on a 19–1 run, with Green and Ginóbili scoring most of those points. James and Wade turned in strong performances, leading the Heat with 25 points each, while Allen had five three-pointers (including two four-point plays) and scored 21 points total.

=== Game 6 ===
ABC

June 18
9:00 pm

Boxscore

San Antonio Spurs 100, Miami Heat 103 (OT)
Scoring by quarter: 25–27, 25–17, 25–21, 20–30, Overtime: 5–8
Pts: Tim Duncan 30; Rebs: Tim Duncan 17; Asts: Tony Parker 8	Pts: LeBron James 32; Rebs: Chris Bosh 11; Asts: LeBron James 11
Series tied, 3–3

American Airlines Arena, Miami, Florida
Attendance: 19,900
Referees:
- No. 17 Joe Crawford
- No. 24 Mike Callahan
- No. 41 Ken Mauer

External videos
- Full game broadcast by ABC on YouTube

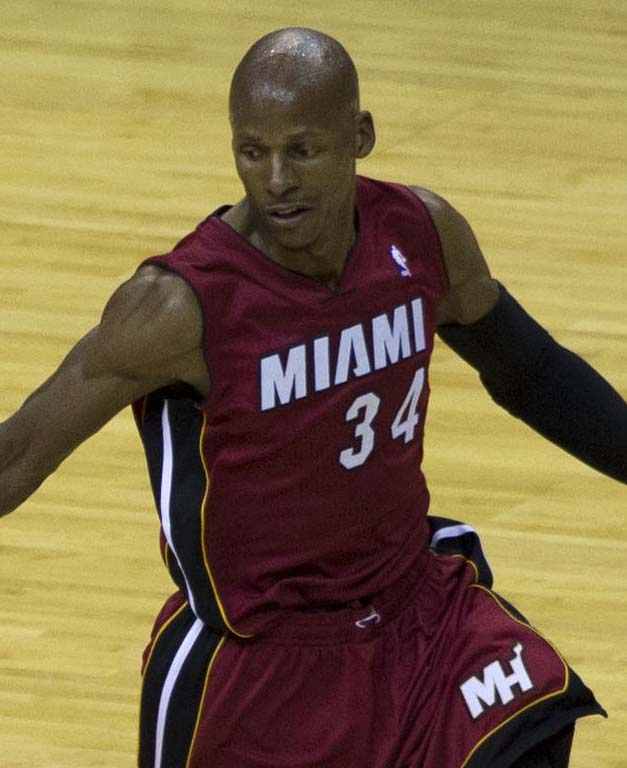
Ray Allen made a game-tying three-pointer to send Game 6 to overtime, allowing the Heat to force a deciding Game 7.

The Heat rode a triple-double performance from James (32 points along with 11 assists and 10 rebounds)—becoming the first player since Magic Johnson in 1991 to have two triple doubles in the same NBA Finals series—and 20 points from Chalmers, while Duncan led the Spurs with 30 points and 17 rebounds; however, Duncan was held scoreless after the third quarter. Fans and media outlets alike have begun dubbing it "The Headband Game" in reference to the signature accessory James lost on a dunk with just under nine minutes left in the 4th quarter and did not wear the rest of the way, although it has been also known as "The Shot" amongst Heat fans due to Allen's heroics. The game is considered by players and commentators to be one of the greatest games in NBA history. James regards it as one of the best games in which he has ever taken part. NBA legend Magic Johnson called it "one of the best two or three games" he had ever seen. On July 17, 2013, Game 6 of the 2013 NBA Finals received the 2013 ESPY award for Best Game.

The Spurs were leading 75–65 at the end of the third quarter, but James sparked a 20–7 run for the Heat to start the fourth quarter, personally scoring 11 of those points. With 10:30 remaining, the Spurs still up 77–70, Miller's shoe came loose but he did not have time to put it back on so he tossed it off court; with one sock and one shoe he received a pass from James and sunk a three-pointer to pull the Heat within four.

With 2:09 remaining, the Heat pulled ahead 89–86 but the Spurs went on a run of their own spearheaded by Parker, who shot a stepback three and a reverse layup in consecutive possessions to put his team ahead 91–89. On the next possession, James lost the ball in the post; this eventually led to a pair of Ginóbili free throws after an intentional foul (by Allen) on the other end, pushing the score to 93–89. James committed a second crucial turnover forcing it into the hands of Ginóbili, who was fouled by Allen. Ginóbili missed one of two free throws, setting the stage for the comeback.

With 28.2 remaining, the Spurs were up 94–89, and league officials began bringing out the yellow tape to cordon off the floor for the Larry O'Brien Trophy presentation. James missed a three-pointer, but the ball was kept in Heat possession by Wade and Allen both tipping the ball until Miller got the rebound and passed to James, who made the three-pointer to pull within two points with 20 seconds left. After failing to steal the inbound pass, the Heat immediately fouled Kawhi Leonard, who also missed one of two free throws, keeping it a one-possession game at 95–92. James was entrusted with the final shot but missed a 26-foot jumper from beyond the arc. Bosh was able to collect a key offensive rebound before passing to Allen, who stepped backward and made a three-point basket from the right corner with 5.2 left to tie the game. Spurs head coach Gregg Popovich had opted for a small lineup to defend the perimeter in the closing moments of the fourth quarter, resulting in the Spurs' Duncan being on the bench as both Heat's three-pointers came off of rebounds. The Spurs had no timeouts left after Allen's shot, but received a de facto extra timeout while officials reviewed video to confirm that Allen had both feet behind the 3-point line when he released the ball. Parker was able to drive the length of the court, but airballed a potential short series-winning off-balance jumper over James, as the buzzer sounded to send the game into overtime.

In overtime, James hit a floater with 1:43 remaining to give Miami a 101–100 lead. That score would hold all the way down to final moments, where Wade missed a jumper trying to extend the lead, and San Antonio getting the rebound with 12 seconds left. The Spurs opted not to call timeout and let Ginóbili get a full head of steam heading towards the basket. However, Allen stripped the ball away from Ginobili on his way up for a shot and recovered the ball, forcing the Spurs to foul him with 1.9 left. Allen made both free throws to put Miami up 103–100. San Antonio still had a chance to send the game into a second overtime, but Bosh, who had a key block earlier in OT, came through with another key block in the final seconds to prevent a three-point game-tying shot from Green and force a Game 7.

=== Game 7 ===
ABC

June 20
9:00 pm

Boxscore

San Antonio Spurs 88, Miami Heat 95
Scoring by quarter: 16–18, 28–28, 27–26, 17–23
Pts: Tim Duncan 24; Rebs: Kawhi Leonard 16; Asts: Manu Ginóbili 5	Pts: LeBron James 37; Rebs: LeBron James 12; Asts: Allen, James 4 each
Miami wins NBA Finals, 4–3

American Airlines Arena, Miami, Florida
Attendance: 19,900
Referees:
- No. 43 Danny Crawford
- No. 48 Scott Foster
- No. 13 Monty McCutchen

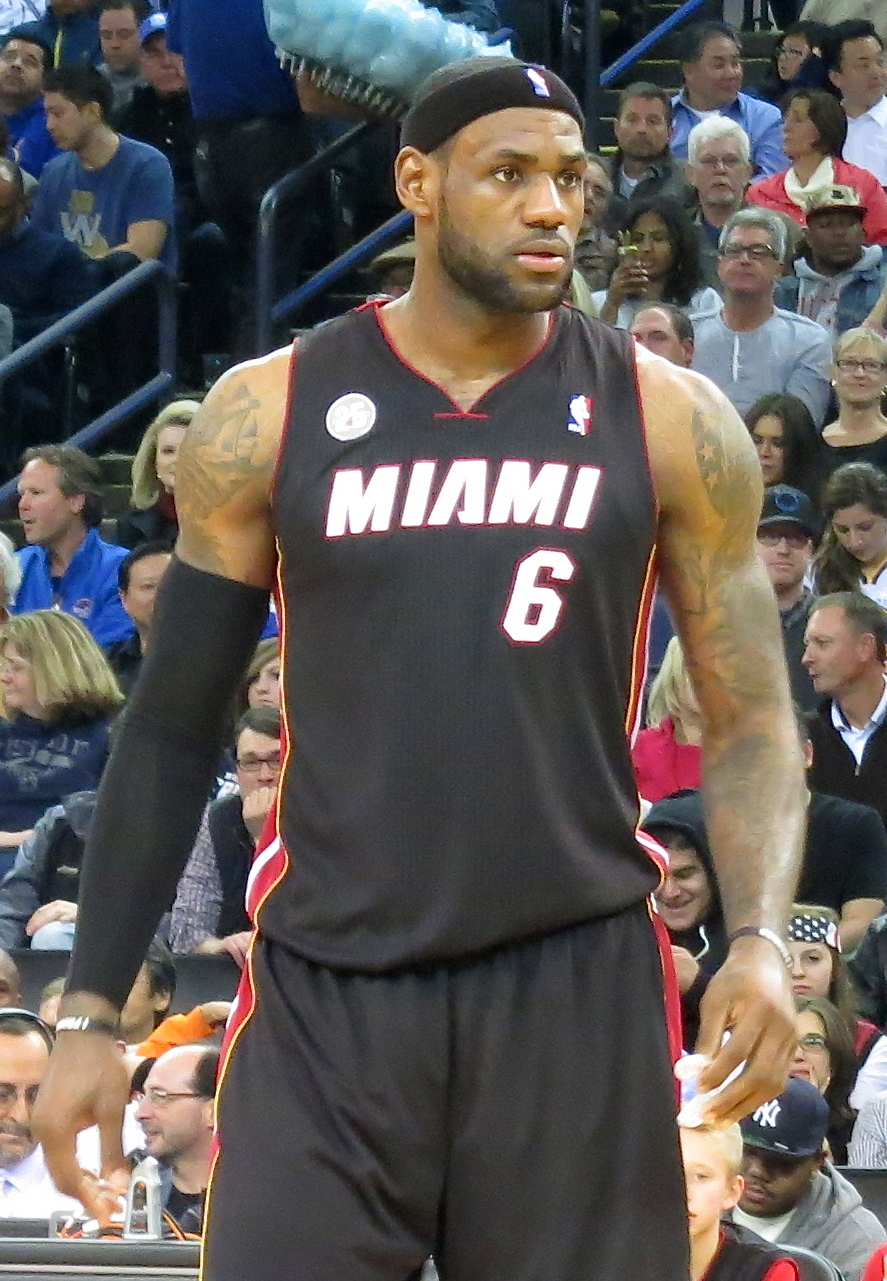
LeBron James was named the NBA Finals MVP for the second straight season.

LeBron James led the Miami Heat with 37 points, including five 3-pointers, and grabbed 12 rebounds to lead Miami to a 95–88 victory in Game 7. With the win, the Heat captured their second consecutive NBA championship. After a 3-point shot by Leonard, the Spurs trailed by just two with 50 seconds remaining in the game. They had a chance to tie the game, but Duncan, guarded by Shane Battier, missed a shot under the basket and a follow-up tip-in attempt. James went on to hit a 17-foot jumper that secured the victory.

Wade scored 23 points and had 10 rebounds, and Battier scored 18 points on six 3-pointers to offset scoreless nights by Bosh and Allen. James tied Tommy Heinsohn's record set in 1957 for most points in an NBA Finals Game 7 win, and won his second straight NBA Finals MVP.

James joined Michael Jordan as the only players to ever win consecutive regular season and Finals MVPs. The Heat became the fourth team to win the final two games at home since the Finals went to a 2-3-2 format in 1985, after the 1988 Lakers, 1994 Rockets, and the 2010 Lakers. They were also the first repeat champions since the 2010 Lakers. The Spurs were meanwhile handed their first Finals loss in franchise history. It was also the last NBA Finals under the tenure of Commissioner David Stern before his retirement in February 2014.

The 2013 Finals ended up being the last games that future Hall of Fame swingman Tracy McGrady appeared; McGrady played a total of 14 minutes in two games (scoring zero points in either) and retired in August 2013.

This Game 7 is the last under the 2–3–2 format before it was changed back to 2–2–1–1–1 the following year.

This would be the last professional sports championship in the Big 4 sports leagues for the Miami metropolitan area until the Florida Panthers defeated the Edmonton Oilers four games to three in the Stanley Cup Final in 2024.

== Rosters ==
=== Miami Heat ===
2012–13 Miami Heat roster
Players

Pos.	No.	Player	Height	Weight	DOB	From
G	34	Ray Allen	6 ft 5 in (1.96 m)	205 lb (93 kg)	1975–07–20	Connecticut
F/C	11	Chris Andersen	6 ft 10 in (2.08 m)	228 lb (103 kg)	1978–07–09	Blinn
C	50	Joel Anthony	6 ft 9 in (2.06 m)	245 lb (111 kg)	1982–08–09	UNLV
F	31	Shane Battier	6 ft 8 in (2.03 m)	225 lb (102 kg)	1978–09–09	Duke
F/C	1	Chris Bosh	6 ft 11 in (2.11 m)	235 lb (107 kg)	1984–03–24	Georgia Tech
G	15	Mario Chalmers	6 ft 2 in (1.88 m)	190 lb (86 kg)	1986–05–19	Kansas
G	30	Norris Cole	6 ft 2 in (1.88 m)	175 lb (79 kg)	1988–10–13	Cleveland State
F/C	40	Udonis Haslem	6 ft 8 in (2.03 m)	235 lb (107 kg)	1980–06–09	Florida
F/C	5	Juwan Howard	6 ft 9 in (2.06 m)	250 lb (113 kg)	1973–02–07	Michigan
F	6	LeBron James	6 ft 8 in (2.03 m)	250 lb (113 kg)	1984–12–30	St. Vincent–St. Mary HS (OH)
G/F	22	James Jones	6 ft 8 in (2.03 m)	215 lb (98 kg)	1980–10–04	Miami (FL)
F	9	Rashard Lewis	6 ft 10 in (2.08 m)	230 lb (104 kg)	1979–08–08	Elsik HS (TX)
G/F	13	Mike Miller	6 ft 8 in (2.03 m)	210 lb (95 kg)	1980–02–19	Florida
F/C	24	Jarvis Varnado	6 ft 9 in (2.06 m)	230 lb (104 kg)	1988–03–01	Mississippi State
G	3	Dwyane Wade	6 ft 4 in (1.93 m)	220 lb (100 kg)	1982–01–17	Marquette

Coaches
Head coach
- Erik Spoelstra
Assistant(s)
- Bob McAdoo
- Keith Askins
- Ron Rothstein
- David Fizdale
- Chad Kammerer
- Octavio De La Grana

Legend
- (DP) Unsigned draft pick
- (FA) Free agent
- (S) Suspended
- (DL) On assignment to D-League affiliate
- Injured

Roster
Updated: March 2, 2013

=== San Antonio Spurs ===
2012–13 San Antonio Spurs roster
Players

Pos.	No.	Player	Height	Weight	DOB	From
F/C	16	Aron Baynes	6 ft 10 in (2.08 m)	260 lb (118 kg)	1986–12–09	Washington State
F/C	45	DeJuan Blair	6 ft 7 in (2.01 m)	270 lb (122 kg)	1989–04–22	Pittsburgh
F/C	15	Matt Bonner	6 ft 10 in (2.08 m)	235 lb (107 kg)	1980–04–05	Florida
G	25	Nando de Colo	6 ft 5 in (1.96 m)	200 lb (91 kg)	1987–06–23	France
F/C	33	Boris Diaw	6 ft 8 in (2.03 m)	235 lb (107 kg)	1982–04–16	France
F/C	21	Tim Duncan	6 ft 11 in (2.11 m)	255 lb (116 kg)	1976–04–25	Wake Forest
G	20	Manu Ginóbili	6 ft 6 in (1.98 m)	205 lb (93 kg)	1977–07–28	Argentina
G/F	4	Danny Green	6 ft 6 in (1.98 m)	210 lb (95 kg)	1987–06–22	North Carolina
G	5	Cory Joseph	6 ft 3 in (1.91 m)	185 lb (84 kg)	1991–08–20	Texas
G/F	2	Kawhi Leonard	6 ft 7 in (2.01 m)	225 lb (102 kg)	1991–06–29	San Diego State
G/F	1	Tracy McGrady	6 ft 8 in (2.03 m)	225 lb (102 kg)	1979–05–24	Mount Zion Christian Academy (HS)
G	8	Patty Mills	6 ft 0 in (1.83 m)	185 lb (84 kg)	1988–08–11	Saint Mary's
G	14	Gary Neal	6 ft 4 in (1.93 m)	210 lb (95 kg)	1984–10–03	Towson
G	9	Tony Parker	6 ft 2 in (1.88 m)	185 lb (84 kg)	1982–05–17	France
C	22	Tiago Splitter	6 ft 11 in (2.11 m)	240 lb (109 kg)	1985–01–01	Brazil

Coaches
Head coach
- Gregg Popovich
Assistant(s)
- Mike Budenholzer
- Brett Brown
- Chip Engelland
- Chad Forcier
- Ime Udoka

Legend
- (DP) Unsigned draft pick
- (FA) Free agent
- (S) Suspended
- (DL) On assignment to D-League affiliate
- Injured

Roster
Updated: May 16, 2013

== Player statistics ==
Legend
GP	Games played	GS	Games started	MPG	Minutes per game
FG%	Field-goal percentage	3P%	3-point field-goal percentage	FT%	Free-throw percentage
RPG	Rebounds per game	APG	Assists per game	SPG	Steals per game
BPG	Blocks per game	PPG	Points per game

Miami Heat

Miami Heat statistics
Player	GP	GS	MPG	FG%	3P%	FT%	RPG	APG	SPG	BPG	PPG
Ray Allen	7	0	27.5	.543	.545	.923	2.3	1.6	0.1	0.0	10.6
Chris Andersen	5	0	14.2	.727	.000	.600	3.0	0.0	0.8	0.6	4.4
Joel Anthony	4	0	3.7	.500	.000	.000	1.8	0.0	0.0	0.0	0.5
Shane Battier	7	0	12.4	.444	.444	1.000	1.6	0.9	0.1	0.3	5.6
Chris Bosh	7	7	34.3	.462	.000	.733	8.9	2.1	1.9	1.6	11.9
Mario Chalmers	7	7	31.6	.388	.406	.692	2.7	2.1	0.7	0.0	10.6
Norris Cole	5	0	16.3	.273	.333	.500	1.0	2.4	0.8	0.2	3.0
Udonis Haslem	6	3	10.6	.444	.000	1.000	2.8	0.0	0.0	0.2	1.5
LeBron James	7	7	43.0	.447	.353	.795	10.9	7.0	2.3	0.9	25.3
James Jones	3	0	3.9	.400	.667	.000	0.3	0.0	0.0	0.3	2.0
Rashard Lewis	3	0	3.9	.333	.000	.000	0.7	0.7	0.0	0.0	1.3
Mike Miller	7	4	21.8	.591	.611	.000	2.7	0.9	0.6	0.3	5.3
Dwyane Wade	7	7	36.4	.476	.000	.773	4.0	4.6	1.9	1.3	19.6

San Antonio Spurs

San Antonio Spurs statistics
Player	GP	GS	MPG	FG%	3P%	FT%	RPG	APG	SPG	BPG	PPG
DeJuan Blair	3	0	5.8	.455	.000	.333	2.7	0.3	0.7	0.0	3.7
Matt Bonner	6	0	6.1	.400	.250	1.000	1.2	0.2	0.2	0.0	1.8
Nando de Colo	2	0	2.5	.000	.000	.000	0.5	0.5	0.0	0.0	0.0
Boris Diaw	6	0	15.7	.500	.500	.750	2.5	1.7	0.0	0.2	4.0
Tim Duncan	7	7	36.3	.490	.000	.821	12.1	1.4	0.9	1.4	18.9
Manu Ginóbili	7	3	28.5	.433	.250	.786	2.1	4.3	0.7	0.0	11.6
Danny Green	7	7	35.4	.444	.551	.875	4.1	0.7	1.0	1.6	14.0
Cory Joseph	6	0	7.1	.444	.000	.500	1.0	1.0	0.3	0.0	1.8
Kawhi Leonard	7	7	36.5	.513	.348	.706	11.1	0.9	2.0	0.4	14.6
Tracy McGrady	2	0	7.2	.000	.000	.000	2.0	2.5	0.0	0.5	0.0
Patty Mills	2	0	6.7	.400	.000	.000	0.5	0.0	0.0	0.0	2.0
Gary Neal	7	0	24.4	.414	.467	1.000	2.4	0.9	0.0	0.0	9.4
Tony Parker	7	7	35.2	.412	.286	.727	1.9	6.4	1.0	0.1	15.7
Tiago Splitter	7	4	15.4	.448	.000	.800	2.0	0.4	0.7	0.4	4.9

== Broadcast ==
In the United States, the NBA Finals aired on ABC (including the respective Miami and San Antonio affiliates WPLG and KSAT-TV) with Mike Breen and Jeff Van Gundy served as commentators. ESPN Radio aired it as well and had Mike Tirico and Hubie Brown as commentators. For the first time, ESPN Deportes provided exclusive Spanish-language coverage of The Finals, with a commentary team of Álvaro Martín, Carlos Morales, and Alejandro Montecchia.

Game	Ratings (households)	American audience (in millions)
1	8.8	14.241
2	8.5	14.571
3	8.5	14.045
4	10.0	16.228
5	9.5	16.267
6	12.3	20.636
7	15.3	26.319
