= Teddy Dupay =

American college basketball player

Personal information
- Born: June 26, 1979 (age 47) Fort Myers, Florida
- Listed height: 5 ft 10 in (1.78 m)
- Listed weight: 178 lb (81 kg)

Career information
- College: Florida (1999–2001)
- Position: Guard
- Number: 5

Career highlights
- McDonald's All-American Game (1998)

Teddy Dupay was a basketball player. He played for coach Billy Donovan's Florida Gators men's basketball team, and had a career marred by injuries.

Dupay is one of the most decorated high school players in the history of Florida prep basketball. He set the scoring record at the time with 3,744 points at Mariner. Dupay won the 3-point contest at the 1998 McDonald's All-American Boys Game.
