= Bob Hudson (American football, born 1930) =

American football player (1930–2018)

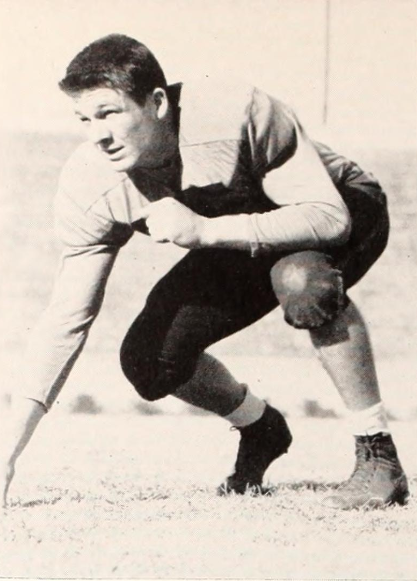
- Hudson at Clemson in 1950

No. 89, 88, 42, 41, 61, 53
- Positions: Defensive back, linebacker, end

Personal information
- Born: April 5, 1930; Lamar, South Carolina, U.S.
- Died: October 15, 2018 (aged 88)
- Listed height: 6 ft 4 in (1.93 m)
- Listed weight: 225 lb (102 kg)

Career information
- High school: North Charleston (SC)
- College: Clemson
- NFL draft: 1951: 12th round, 146th overall pick

Career history
- New York Giants (1951–1952); Philadelphia Eagles (1953–1958); Washington Redskins (1959); Dallas Texans (1960); Denver Broncos (1960–1961)

Career NFL/AFL statistics
- Interceptions: 19
- Fumble recoveries: 11
- Sacks: 3
- Stats at Pro Football Reference

Robert Willard Hudson (April 5, 1930 – October 15, 2018) was an American football offensive lineman in the National Football League (NFL) for the New York Giants, the Philadelphia Eagles, and the Washington Redskins. Hudson also played in the American Football League (AFL) for the Dallas Texans and the Denver Broncos. He played college football at Clemson University and was drafted in the 12th round of the 1951 NFL draft.

Up until his death in 2018, he was living in Rowlett, Texas.

== See also ==
- Other American Football League players
