= Arnold Goodstein =

American politician (born 1944)

Member of the South Carolina House of Representatives
- In office 1971–1973

Member of the South Carolina Senate
- In office 1975-1979
- In office 1969–1970

Personal details
- Born: Arnold Samuel Goodstein; April 17, 1944 (age 82) Florence, South Carolina, U.S.
- Party: Democratic
- Spouse: Diane Goodstein
- Children: 2
- Education: Davidson College; University of South Carolina

Military service
- Allegiance: United States
- Battles/wars: Vietnam War; Tet Offensive

Arnold Samuel Goodstein (born April 17, 1944) is an American lawyer, veteran, and former politician in South Carolina. He served in the state legislature. He lives in Charleston.

== Early life, education and career ==
Goodstein was born in Florence, South Carolina. Melton A. Goodstein and Carolyn F. Heyman Goodstein were his parents. He lived in North Charleston and attended North Charleston High School. He graduated from Davidson College and received his Juris Doctor degree from the University of South Carolina. He was a partner at the law firm Goodstein & Jennings.

He was part of ROTC, served in Vietnam and received two bronze stars, and was a member of the South Carolina National Guard.

== Political career ==
Goodstein served in the South Carolina House of Representatives from 1971 to 1973 and the South Carolina Senate in 1969 and 1970 and again from 1975 to 1979.

== Personal life ==
Goodstein married Cynthia Lovay and they had a daughter. He is currently married to circuit court judge Diane Goodstein.

=== House fire ===
On October 5, 2025, Goodstein, his son, and another family member were injured in a fire at his Edisto Island home. His wife was not injured. The fire is being investigated by state law enforcement as Judge Goodstein and the family was subject to death threats for years including threats after a September 2025 ruling she issued for a temporary injunction against the Trump administration's attempt to access the state's voter files. The South Carolina Law Enforcement Division Chief said there was no evidence of arson.
