= Jalon Walker =

American football player (born 2004)

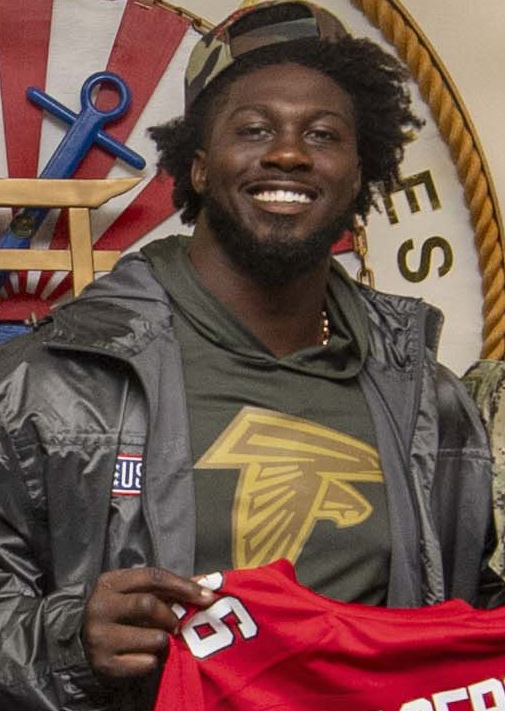
- Walker with the Atlanta Falcons in 2026

No. 11 – Atlanta Falcons
- Position: Defensive end
- Roster status: Injured reserve

Personal information
- Born: February 24, 2004 (age 22); Conway, South Carolina, U.S.
- Listed height: 6 ft 2 in (1.88 m)
- Listed weight: 245 lb (111 kg)

Career information
- High school: Salisbury (Salisbury, North Carolina)
- College: Georgia (2022–2024)
- NFL draft: 2025: 1st round, 15th overall pick

Career history
- Atlanta Falcons (2025–present)

Awards and highlights
- CFP national champion (2022); Butkus Award (2024)

Career NFL statistics as of 2025
- Tackles: 36
- Sacks: 5.5
- Forced fumbles: 2
- Pass deflections: 1
- Fumble recoveries: 1
- Stats at Pro Football Reference

Jalon Nicholas Walker (born February 24, 2004) is an American professional football defensive end for the Atlanta Falcons of the National Football League (NFL). He played college football for the Georgia Bulldogs, winning the Butkus Award in 2024, and was selected by the Falcons in the first round of the 2025 NFL draft.

== Early life ==
Walker was born in Conway, South Carolina and attended Salisbury High School in Salisbury, North Carolina. He was the 2021 North Carolina Gatorade Football Player of the Year after recording 79 tackles and eight sacks. A five-star recruit, Walker was selected to play in the 2022 Under Armour All-American Game. He committed to the University of Georgia to play college football.

== College career ==
Walker (#11) played in all 15 games his true freshman year at Georgia in 2022 and had nine tackles and one sack. He was part of the team that won the National Championship over TCU. As a sophomore in 2023, he again played in all 14 games and recorded 20 tackles and five sacks. As a junior in 2024, Walker was named a first team All-American and won the Butkus Award as the nation's top linebacker.

On January 6, 2025, Walker declared for the 2025 NFL draft.

== Professional career ==
Pre-draft measurables
Height	Weight	Arm length	Hand span	Wingspan
6 ft 1 in (1.85 m)	243 lb (110 kg)	32 in (0.81 m)	10 1/4 in (0.26 m)	6 ft 7 7/8 in (2.03 m)
All values from NFL Combine

Walker was selected in the first round by the Atlanta Falcons with the 15th overall pick in the 2025 NFL draft. As a rookie, he finished with 5.5 sacks, 36 total tackles (24 solo), one pass defended, two forced fumbles, and one fumble recovery.

Walker suffered an ACL tear during training camp on August 4, 2026. It was subsequently announced that he would miss the entirety of the 2026 NFL season.

== NFL career statistics ==
Year	Team	Games		Tackles					Fumbles				Interceptions			
Year	Team	GP	GS	Cmb	Solo	Ast	Sck	TFL	FF	FR	Yds	TD	Int	Yds	TD	PD
2025	ATL	15	9	36	24	12	5.5	5	2	1	0	—	—	—	—	1
Career		15	9	36	24	12	5.5	5	2	1	0	—	—	—	—	1

== Personal life ==
Walker's father, Curtis Walker, was the head football coach at Catawba College from 2012 to 2022, and previously had stints as the defensive coordinator at Coastal Carolina University and Western Carolina University.
