= Diane Goodstein =

American jurist

Judge for South Carolina 1st Judicial Circuit
- Incumbent
- Assumed office 1998

District Attorney for Dorchester County, South Carolina
- In office 1986–1988

Personal details
- Born: Diane Shafer Goodstein; 1955 (age 70–71) Dillon, South Carolina, U.S.
- Spouse: Arnold Goodstein
- Children: 2
- Education: University of North Carolina at Chapel Hill (B.A.); University of North Carolina School of Law (J.D.)

Diane Goodstein (born 1955) is a judge at the South Carolina Circuit Court. She is married to fellow lawyer Arnold Goodstein who is a veteran and served in the state legislature. He is a Democrat.

The Trump administration had been publicly critical of Judge Goodstein who in September 2025 temporarily blocked South Carolina's election commission from releasing its voter files to the Department of Justice for its election integrity investigations. She was later unanimously overruled by the South Carolina Supreme Court as the justices determined her order was "clearly erroneous".

== Early life and education ==
Diane Schafer was born in July 1955 in Dillon, South Carolina. She is the daughter of Joseph M. Schafer and Helen Schafer Mast. Her uncle was Alan Schafer, a prominent Jewish-American businessman who founded the South of the Border roadside attraction near Dillon, South Carolina, where she was born.

She earned her bachelor's degree from the University of North Carolina at Chapel Hill in 1978 and her Juris Doctor from the University of North Carolina School of Law in 1981.

== Career ==
Goodstein began her legal career by working as an associate at the firm of Goodstein, Bowling, Douglas & Phillips from 1981 to 1983 before becoming Vice President in the Goodstein & Goodstein law firm, where she served from 1983 to 1998. She also served as Dorchester County Attorney and General Counsel for the Charleston County Aviation Authority from 1986 to 1988. In a significant career milestone, Goodstein was elected by the South Carolina General Assembly as a Resident Circuit Judge in May 1998. She has maintained her position on the bench, securing re-elections in 2016 and 2022. Goodstein is currently a member of the Circuit Court Judges Advisory Committee and the Commission on Judicial Conduct. https://www.mcgowanhood.com/about/eve-goodstein/

== Personal life ==
Judge Goodstein is married to former Democratic Party state senator Arnold Goodstein. The couple has a son and a daughter, who is a well known attorney in her own right. Arnold Goodstein was twice awarded a Bronze Star for his service during the Vietnam War.

=== House fire ===
On October 5, 2025, her husband, son, and another family member were injured in a fire at her Edisto Island home. She was not injured. The fire is being investigated by state law enforcement amidst speculation, without evidence but based on the family having been subject to death threats, most recently after a September 2025 ruling she issued for a temporary injunction against the Trump administration, that it was arson – however the preliminary analysis indicated a domestic accident as the cause.
