= Margaret J. Safrit =

American college professor

Margaret JoAnne Safrit
- Born: June 16, 1935; Salisbury, North Carolina, U.S.
- Died: January 17, 2023 (aged 87); Greensboro, North Carolina, U.S.
- Occupations: College professor, kinesiologist

Margaret JoAnne Safrit (June 16, 1935 – January 17, 2023), also known as Jo Safrit, was an American kinesiologist and college professor. She gave over a million dollars to the University of North Carolina at Greensboro, her alma mater, to support women's sports and the kinesiology program.

== Early life and education ==
Safrit was born in Salisbury, North Carolina, the daughter of Ernest Crawford Safrit Sr. and Margaret Cannon Cline Safrit. Her mother was a teacher. She graduated Boyden High School in 1953, and earned a bachelor's degree in physical education from the North Carolina State Women's College (now the University of North Carolina at Greensboro, or UNCG) in 1957. She earned her master's degree in 1962, and a Ph.D. in 1967, both in kinesiology from the University of Wisconsin–Madison. Her doctoral advisor was Marie R. Liba.

== Career ==
Safrit taught fencing at the University of Texas at Austin after college. She taught at the University of Wisconsin–Milwaukee, and was a Henry Bascom Distinguished Professor at the University of Wisconsin–Madison. At Madison she was director of the Physical Education Measurement and Evaluation Laboratory on campus. She also taught at American University, where she was chair of the Department of Health and Fitness. She was an invited lecturer at Shanghai University of Sport in 1985. She later received an honorary doctorate from Shanghai University. She received a national award from SHAPE America and was a fellow of the National Academy of Kinesiology.

Inducted in 1978, she is Fellow #254 in the National Academy of Kinesiology (formerly American Academy of Physical Education; American Academy of Kinesiology and Physical Education). She served the Academy as President during 1986-1987, and was recognized by the Academy with its highest honor, the Hetherington Award, in 1999.

== Publications ==
Safrit's research involved quantitative studies of exercise and fitness, and devising standards for evaluating fitness. Her work appeared in academic journals including American Journal of Occupational Therapy, Quest Journal of Motor Behavior, Journal of Physical Education, Recreation & Dance, and Research Quarterly for Exercise and Sport. She also published four books on fitness evaluation, measurement, and testing.

- "Measurement in occupational therapy" (1976, with B. R. Hasselkus)
- "Effect of Guided Practice on Overhand-Throw Ball Velocities of Kindergarten Children" (1977, with Lolas E. Halverson, Mary Anne Robertson, and Thomas W. Roberts)
- "Issues in Setting Motor Performance Standards" (1980, with Ted A. Baumgartner, Andrew S. Jackson, and Carol L. Stamm)
- "Methodological Issues in Short-Term Motor Memory Research" (1980, with Judith A. Spray and Gordon L. Diewert)
- Evaluation in Physical Education (1981)
- "Handedness and Hand Joint Changes in Rheumatoid Arthritis" (1981, with Bettye R. Hasselkus and K. K. Kshepakaran)
- "Women in Research in Physical Education: A 1984 Update" (1984)
- "The Test Battery Reliability of the Health-Related Physical Fitness Test" (1987, with Terry M. Wood)
- Measurement Concepts in Physical Education and Exercise Science (1989, edited with Terry M. Wood)
- "Item Response Theory and the Measurement of Motor Behavior" (1989, with Allan S. Cohen and M. Glaucia Costa)
- Introduction to measurement in physical education and exercise science (1990)
- "The Validity and Reliability of Fitness Tests for Children: A Review" (1990)
- "Measurement and Evaluation Curricula in Professional Physical Education Programs—Current Trends" (1990)
- "The Difficulty of Sit-Ups Tests: An Empirical Investigation" (1992, with Weimo Zhu, M. Glaucia Costa, and Liru Zhang)
- Complete Guide to Youth Fitness Testing (1994)
- "A Genealogy of Measurement Specialists in Physical Education and Exercise Science" (2003, with Ted A. Baumgartner)

== Personal life and donations to UNCG ==
Safrit and fellow kinesiology professor Catherine Dunnington Ennis were longtime partners. After Ennis died in 2017, Safrit donated $1 million to create the Safrit-Ennis Distinguished Professorship in Kinesiology at UNCG, and the Safrit-Ennis Women's Basketball Athletic Scholarship to support UNCG's women's basketball program. "Basketball is a game changer for women as well as men, and it changed my life", she said in 2018. She also created the Mildred Curlee Cooper Scholarship for Women's Basketball (named for her high school coach), the Safrit Measurement in Research Fund, and the Catherine D. Ennis Undergraduate Kinesiology Scholarship. She also made significant donations the Weatherspoon Art Museum on campus, where an exhibition space is named the Jo Safrit & Cathy Ennis Gallery. Safrit died in 2023, at the age of 87, in Greensboro, North Carolina.
