= Rashard Lewis =

American basketball player (born 1979)

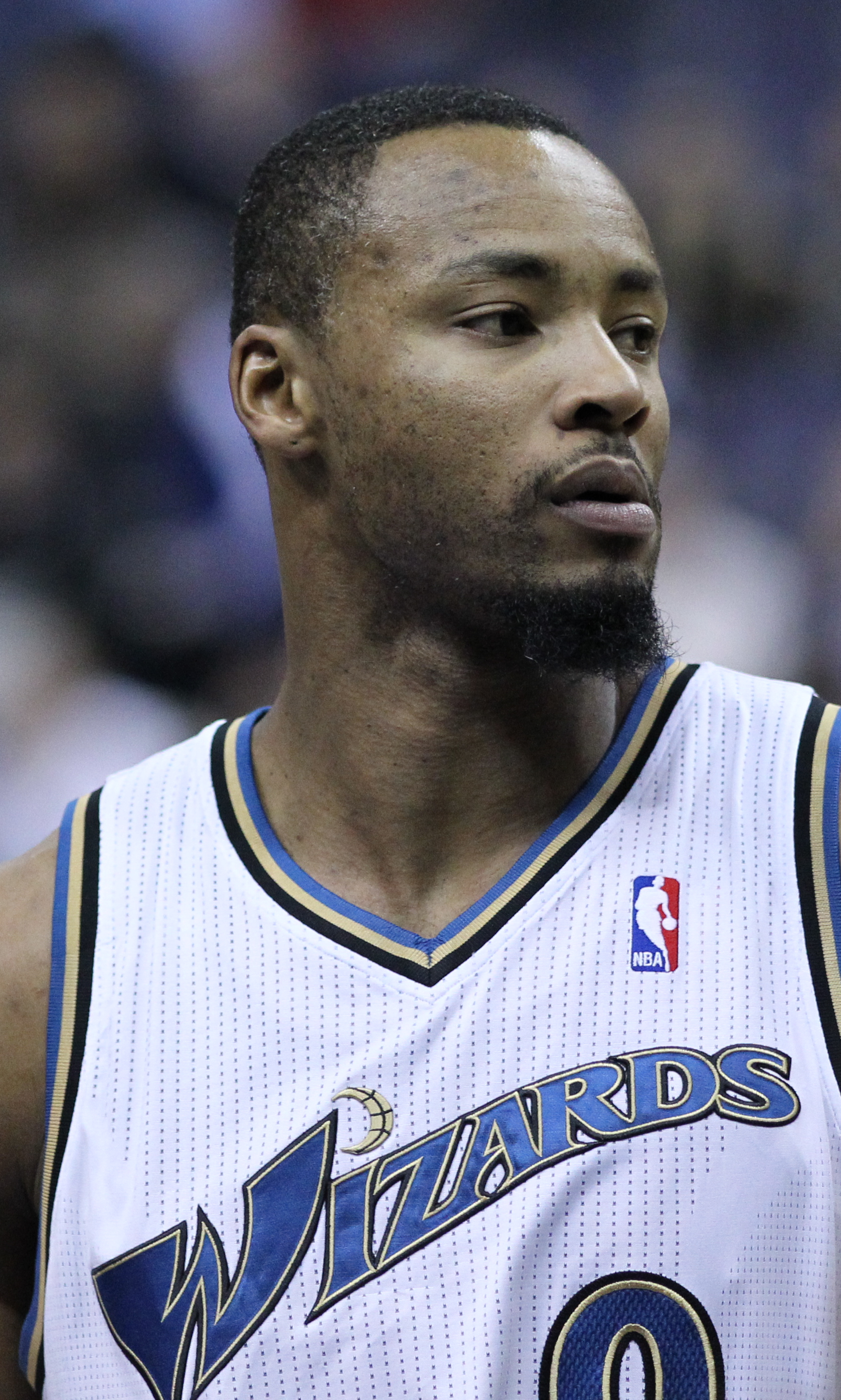
- Lewis with the Washington Wizards in 2011

Personal information
- Born: August 8, 1979 (age 47) Pineville, Louisiana, U.S.
- Listed height: 6 ft 10 in (2.08 m)
- Listed weight: 235 lb (107 kg)

Career information
- High school: Alief Elsik (Houston, Texas)
- NBA draft: 1998: 2nd round, 32nd overall pick
- Drafted by: Seattle SuperSonics
- Playing career: 1998–2014
- Position: Small forward / power forward
- Number: 7, 9

Career history
- 1998–2007: Seattle SuperSonics
- 2007–2010: Orlando Magic
- 2010–2012: Washington Wizards
- 2012–2014: Miami Heat

Career highlights
- NBA champion (2013); 2× NBA All-Star (2005, 2009); Mr. Basketball USA (1998); First-team Parade All-American (1998); McDonald's All-American (1998); Texas Mr. Basketball (1998)

Career NBA statistics
- Points: 15,579 (14.9 ppg)
- Rebounds: 5,433 (5.2 rpg)
- Steals: 1,115 (1.1 spg)
- Stats at NBA.com
- Stats at Basketball Reference
Medals
Men's basketball
Representing United States
Goodwill Games
Gold medal – first place	2001 Brisbane	National team

Rashard Quovon Lewis (born August 8, 1979) is an American former professional basketball player, currently serving as player development coach for the San Antonio Spurs. Lewis entered the NBA directly from Alief Elsik High School. He rose to prominence in the NBA as a scorer with the Seattle SuperSonics, and was later a member of the Orlando Magic, Washington Wizards, and Miami Heat. He garnered two NBA All-Star selections, one with Seattle and another with Orlando.

Lewis reached the NBA Finals three times (Magic 2008–2009, Heat 2012–2013, 2013–2014), winning an NBA championship in 2012–2013 as a member of the Heat.

== High school ==
Lewis attended and played basketball for Alief Elsik High School, where he was elevated to the school's varsity squad in his freshman year.

== NBA career ==
=== Seattle SuperSonics (1998–2007) ===
Despite being recruited by Florida State, Kansas and Houston, Lewis bypassed college and opted for the 1998 NBA draft, wherein he was selected by the Seattle SuperSonics with the 32nd overall pick. At the time of his selection, he was the last player remaining in the "green room", where fifteen of the top draft prospects sit until their selection. He played well for the Sonics and following the acquisition of Ray Allen, Lewis and Allen made Seattle a contender during the early 2000s.

In 2001, Lewis was selected to play for the United States Basketball Team in the Goodwill Games, in which they won the gold medal. On October 31, 2003, Lewis scored a career-high 50 points to lead the Seattle SuperSonics to a 124–105 win over the Los Angeles Clippers to close out a two-game series in Saitama, Japan. Lewis was named an All-Star in 2004–05. Lewis holds the SuperSonics' record for most three-pointers made, having passed Dale Ellis for second place on November 22, 2005, and Gary Payton for first place on March 13, 2007, when Lewis made his 918th three-pointer in a game against the Detroit Pistons.

=== Orlando Magic (2007–2010) ===
After playing his first nine seasons for the Seattle SuperSonics, Lewis joined the Orlando Magic in July 2007, as he agreed to a six-year sign-and-trade deal worth $118 million. In his first season with the Magic, Lewis was moved from his usual small forward position to power forward. That year, he made 53 more three-pointers than his previous single-season record (173, 2004–05). During the playoffs, the Magic reached the second round, with Lewis contributing a 33-point performance against the Detroit Pistons in Orlando's only win of the series. Lewis was the Magic's top scorer in the playoffs and set personal records in points, rebounds, and assists.

Lewis started the 2008–09 season as the team's second leading scorer, earning an appearance in the 2009 NBA All-Star Game. In the 2009 NBA playoffs, Lewis hit a game-winning shot in the first game of the Eastern Conference Finals against the Cleveland Cavaliers, what he called the biggest shot of his career. The Magic won the series and advanced to the NBA Finals, where they were defeated by the Los Angeles Lakers in five games.

On August 6, 2009, Lewis was suspended without pay for the first ten games of the 2009–10 season after testing positive for a banned substance that he had taken during the 2008–09 NBA season. He was tested for it during the 2009 NBA Finals. The over-the-counter supplement he was taking contained Dehydroepiandrosterone which is frequently used to combat fatigue.

=== Washington Wizards (2010–2012) ===
On December 18, 2010, Lewis was traded to the Washington Wizards in exchange for Gilbert Arenas. In 60 games for the Wizards over two seasons, Lewis averaged 9.7 points, 4.9 rebounds and 1.5 assists per game.

On June 20, 2012, Lewis was traded, along with the 46th pick in the 2012 NBA draft, to the New Orleans Hornets in exchange for Trevor Ariza and Emeka Okafor. On June 30, 2012, the Hornets agreed to buyout terms with Lewis and waived him.

=== Miami Heat (2012–2014) ===
On July 11, 2012, Lewis signed a two-year deal with the Miami Heat. The move reunited him with former Seattle teammate Ray Allen. The Heat finished the 2012–13 season with a league-best 66–16 record. Lewis won his first NBA championship with the Heat's Finals series victory over the San Antonio Spurs.

Lewis earned rave reviews from Heat coach Erik Spoelstra for the way he defended in Game 3 of the 2014 Eastern Conference Finals against the Indiana Pacers, even though he finished without a single point, rebound, assist or steal. Lewis worked his way into the starting lineup during the series, earning notoriety for helping the team despite a lack of impressive box score statistics in games 3 and 4. In Game 5 of the series, Lewis started again, and scored 18 points on 6-of-9 shooting from behind the three-point line. In Game 6, Lewis started and scored 13 points as the Heat advanced to the NBA Finals. The Heat went on to lose the Finals to the San Antonio Spurs in five games.

=== Dallas Mavericks (2014) ===
On July 19, 2014, Lewis signed with the Dallas Mavericks. However, just four days later, his contract was voided by the Mavericks after he failed his physical when it was discovered that his right knee required surgery.

== BIG3 career ==
=== 3 Headed Monsters (2017–2023) ===
In 2017, Rashard joined the 3 Headed Monsters of the BIG3 basketball league, a team that included NBA Hall of Famer Gary Payton as the head coach, and teammates such as Jason Williams, Mahmoud Abdul-Rauf and Kwame Brown. The 3 Headed Monsters went 7–1, reaching the Championship game, where they lost to undefeated Trilogy. Lewis was awarded MVP for the season.

== Coaching career ==
On August 18, 2025, the San Antonio Spurs hired Lewis as part of their player development staff.

== NBA career statistics ==
Legend
GP	Games played	GS	Games started	MPG	Minutes per game
FG%	Field goal percentage	3P%	3-point field goal percentage	FT%	Free throw percentage
RPG	Rebounds per game	APG	Assists per game	SPG	Steals per game
BPG	Blocks per game	PPG	Points per game	**Bold**	Career high
†	Won an NBA championship

=== Regular season ===
Year	Team	GP	GS	MPG	FG%	3P%	FT%	RPG	APG	SPG	BPG	PPG
1998–99	Seattle	20	7	7.3	.365	.167	.571	1.3	.2	.4	.1	2.4
1999–00	Seattle	**82**	8	19.2	**.486**	.333	.683	4.1	.9	.8	.4	8.2
2000–01	Seattle	78	78	34.9	.480	**.432**	.826	6.9	1.6	1.2	.6	14.8
2001–02	Seattle	71	70	36.4	.468	.389	.810	**7.0**	1.7	**1.5**	.6	16.8
2002–03	Seattle	77	77	**39.5**	.452	.346	.820	6.5	1.7	1.3	.5	18.1
2003–04	Seattle	80	80	36.6	.435	.376	.763	6.5	2.2	1.2	.7	17.8
2004–05	Seattle	71	71	38.0	.462	.400	.777	5.5	1.3	1.1	**.9**	20.5
2005–06	Seattle	78	77	36.9	.467	.384	.818	5.0	2.3	1.3	.6	20.1
2006–07	Seattle	60	60	39.1	.461	.390	.841	6.6	2.4	1.1	.7	**22.4**
2007–08	Orlando	81	**81**	38.0	.455	.409	.838	5.4	2.4	1.2	.5	18.2
2008–09	Orlando	79	79	36.2	.439	.397	.836	5.7	**2.6**	1.0	.6	17.7
2009–10	Orlando	72	72	32.9	.435	.397	.806	4.4	1.5	1.1	.4	14.1
2010–11	Orlando	25	25	32.4	.419	.367	.756	4.2	1.2	.9	.4	12.2
2010–11	Washington	32	27	31.7	.446	.347	**.843**	5.8	2.0	.9	.6	11.4
2011–12	Washington	28	15	26.0	.385	.239	.838	3.9	1.0	.8	.4	7.8
2012–13†	Miami	55	9	14.4	.414	.389	.622	2.2	.5	.4	.3	5.2
2013–14	Miami	60	6	16.2	.415	.343	.788	1.8	1.0	.9	.1	4.5
Career		1,049	842	32	.452	.386	.805	5.2	1.7	1.1	.5	14.9
All-Star		2	0	17.5	.308	.167	.500	5.0	.5	.5	.0	5.0

=== Playoffs ===
Year	Team	GP	GS	MPG	FG%	3P%	FT%	RPG	APG	SPG	BPG	PPG
2000	Seattle	5	5	31.4	.441	**.474**	.800	6.2	.6	1.0	.6	15.4
2002	Seattle	3	2	26.3	.375	.167	**1.000**	3.7	.7	.3	.0	12.7
2005	Seattle	8	8	39.0	.406	.200	.880	5.4	1.6	.4	.4	16.9
2008	Orlando	10	10	**41.7**	.436	.309	.821	**7.2**	**3.4**	**1.1**	.5	**19.5**
2009	Orlando	**24**	**24**	41.1	.448	.394	.784	6.4	2.9	1.0	.5	19.0
2010	Orlando	14	14	36.6	**.462**	.373	.800	5.6	2.3	**1.1**	**.7**	12.9
2013†	Miami	11	0	4.3	.400	.000	.500	.6	.4	.2	.2	1.5
2014	Miami	18	8	17.7	.412	.373	.750	2.1	.3	.4	.3	5.3
Career		93	71	30.4	.436	.356	.818	4.7	1.8	.7	.5	12.8

== See also ==
- List of NBA career 3-point scoring leaders
- List of people banned or suspended by the NBA
