= Korleone Young =

American basketball player (born 1978)

Personal information
- Born: December 31, 1978 (age 47) Wichita, Kansas, U.S.
- Listed height: 6 ft 7 in (2.01 m)
- Listed weight: 213 lb (97 kg)

Career information
- High school: East (Wichita, Kansas); Hargrave Military Academy (Chatham, Virginia)
- NBA draft: 1998: 2nd round, 40th overall pick
- Drafted by: Detroit Pistons
- Playing career: 1998–2005
- Position: Small forward
- Number: 45

Career history
- 1998–1999: Detroit Pistons
- 1999–2000: Richmond Rhythm
- 2000–2001: Rockford Lightning
- 2001–2002: Canberra Cannons
- 2002: Sioux Falls Skyforce
- 2003: Avtodor Saratov
- 2003–2004: Heilongjiang Zhaozhou Fengshen
- 2003–2004: Euras
- 2003–2004: Lokomotiv Rostov
- 2005: Heilongjiang Zhaozhou Fengshen

Career highlights
- CBA blocks leader (2001); McDonald's All-American (1998); 2× First-team Parade All-American (1997, 1998)
- Stats at NBA.com
- Stats at Basketball Reference

Suntino Korleone Young (born December 31, 1978) is an American former professional basketball player. He was drafted by the Detroit Pistons of the National Basketball Association (NBA) with the 40th overall pick in the 1998 NBA draft.

== Early life ==
An athletic 6'7" small forward, Young starred at Wichita East High School and Hargrave Military Academy (Virginia). As a senior at Hargrave, he decided to skip college and declare himself eligible for the 1998 NBA draft. Hargrave's then assistant coach, Kevin Keatts, said, "Normally, when a kid is thinking about something like this, you'll hear about it. But with Korleone, it was a total surprise".

== Basketball career ==
Despite his status as a blue chip top college recruit, he slid in the draft. The Detroit Pistons decided to take a chance on Young, selecting him with their second-round pick (40th overall), but Young's tenure with the team was very brief. He appeared in only three games at the end of the lockout-shortened 1999 season and scored 13 total points. The Pistons cut ties with Young soon afterwards because of an injury which limited his effectiveness, and despite summer-league stints with the Philadelphia 76ers, he never made another NBA roster. Because of his failed NBA career, Young's name was cited by many people who supported David Stern's eventual raising of the NBA's minimum draft age. Additionally, Young's coaches questioned his work ethic and maturity.

After his NBA career fizzled, Young played for the Richmond Rhythm of the IBL, averaging 9.7 points and 3.2 rebounds during the 1999–2000 season. The next year, he played for the CBA's Rockford Lightning under coach and former NBA player Stacey King, with whom he averaged 18.3 points, 7.3 rebounds, and 2 blocks, then moved on to the Canberra Cannons of the Australian NBL. Stacey King praised Young as "probably the best player in the CBA" in February 2001, as Young was improving statistically.

With Canberra, Young averaged 27 points to become the 2001 NBL pre-season MVP, but he suffered an injury in the first game of the regular season and terminated his contract with the Cannons on January 9, 2002. In September 2002, Young signed with the Sioux Falls Skyforce of the Continental Basketball Association. The team waived Young three months later.

Young has also played for teams in Russia and China, and he was waived by LidoRose Roseto Basket in September 2005.

In September 2006 he joined Bnei HaSharon of Israel, but he had left the team before the season had started.
