= Nehemiah Broughton =

American football player (born 1982)

No. 30
- Position: Fullback

Personal information
- Born: November 4, 1982 (age 44); North Charleston, South Carolina, U.S.
- Listed height: 5 ft 11 in (1.80 m)
- Listed weight: 255 lb (116 kg)

Career information
- High school: North Charleston
- College: The Citadel
- NFL draft: 2005: 7th round, 222nd overall pick

Career history
- Washington Redskins (2005–2008); Carolina Panthers (2009)*; Minnesota Vikings (2009)*; New York Giants (2009)*; Arizona Cardinals (2009–2010)*
- * Offseason or practice squad member only

Awards and highlights
- First-team All-SoCon (2004)

Career NFL statistics
- Rushing attempts: 1
- Rushing yards: 3
- Stats at Pro Football Reference

Nehemiah Broughton Jr. (born November 4, 1982) is an American former professional football player who was a fullback in the National Football League (NFL). He was selected by the Washington Redskins in the seventh round of the 2005 NFL draft. He played college football for The Citadel Bulldogs.

Broughton was also a member of the Carolina Panthers, Minnesota Vikings, New York Giants and Arizona Cardinals.

== Early life ==
Broughton attended North Charleston High School in North Charleston, South Carolina. As a senior, he was an All-State, and an All-Low Country selection after rushing for 1,670 yards, and 23 touchdowns. After his senior football season, he participated in the All North-South game.

== College career ==
Broughton attended The Citadel (The Military College of South Carolina). He finished his career with 581 carries for 2,638 yards (4.5 yards per car. avg.) and 25 touchdowns, 47 receptions for 455 yards (9.7 yards per rec. avg.) and three touchdowns, and two kickoff returns for 32 yards, for a grand total of 3,125 all-purpose yards, along with four tackles. His 2,638 rushing yards rank fifth on the school's career-record list. He accomplished that, despite missing two games as a junior. He majored in Sports Management.

== Professional career ==
=== Washington Redskins ===
Also known as a rookie phenom, Broughton tore his ACL in practice in May 2007 and spent the following season on injured reserve. As an exclusive-rights free agent in the 2008 offseason, he was non-tendered and became an unrestricted free agent. He was then re-signed on April 2.

The Redskins waived Broughton during final cuts on August 30, 2008, and re-signed him to the practice squad. He spent the entire 2008 season on the team's practice squad.

=== Carolina Panthers ===
After his practice squad contract with the Redskins expired following the 2008 season, Broughton was signed by the Carolina Panthers on January 15, 2009, however he was released on March 17, 2009.

=== Minnesota Vikings ===
Broughton was signed by the Minnesota Vikings on May 18, 2009. He was waived on September 5.

=== New York Giants ===
The New York Giants signed Broughton to their practice squad on September 7, where he remained through the regular season.

=== Arizona Cardinals ===
After his practice squad contract expired with the Giants, Broughton was signed by the Arizona Cardinals on January 5, 2010. He was released by the Cardinals on July 25, 2011.
