= Salisbury High School (North Carolina) =

Historic school building in North Carolina, United States

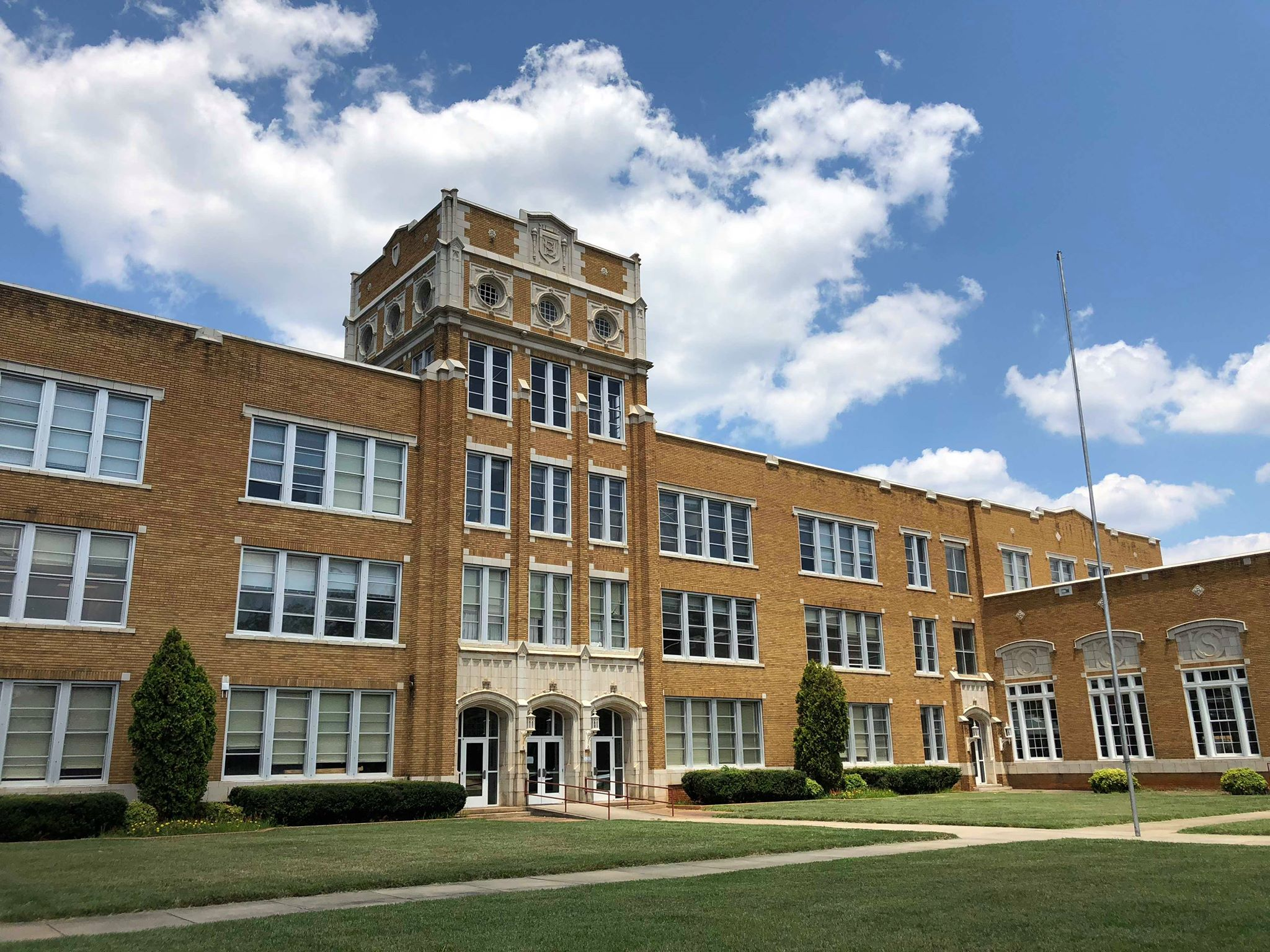
- Salisbury High School in 2018

Location
- 500 Lincolnton Road; Salisbury, North Carolina 28144; United States

Information
- Other name: SHS
- Type: Public
- Established: 1926 (100 years ago)
- CEEB code: 343495
- NCES School ID: 370405002253
- Principal: Marvin Moore
- Teaching staff: 53.84 (FTE)
- Enrollment: 1,014 (2023-2024)
- Student to teacher ratio: 18.83
- Colors: Red, black, and gold
- Mascot: Hornet
- Website: shs.rssed.org

- Boyden High School
- U.S. National Register of Historic Places
- Location within North Carolina Location within the United States
- Nearest city: Salisbury, North Carolina
- Coordinates: 35°39′53″N 80°29′05″W
- Built: 1926
- Architect: C. Gadsden Sayre; L. S. Bradshaw
- NRHP reference No.: 96000564
- Added to NRHP: May 23, 1996

Salisbury High School is a public, co-educational secondary school located in Salisbury, North Carolina. It is one of seven high schools in the Rowan–Salisbury School System.

== History ==
Salisbury High School began in 1904 as an addition to a graded school on Ellis Street and was among the earliest public high schools in North Carolina. The current location was completed in 1926 and named Boyden High School in honor of Colonel Archibald Henderson Boyden, an educator who was then Mayor of Salisbury. It is one of many schools built across North Carolina in the early 20th century. The building was designed by C. Gadsen Sayre and built by L. S. Bradshaw, and (as Boyden High School) was added to the National Register of Historic Places on May 23, 1996. Six additional buildings were constructed on campus to facilitate the school's expanding offerings and enrollment, many of them as part of the Works Progress Administration. In 1971, during desegregation, Boyden and J. C. Price High School consolidated to form Salisbury High School.

== School information ==
For the 2009–2010 school year, Salisbury High School had a total population of 938 students and 67.82 teachers on a (FTE) basis.

As of the 2009–2010 school year, out of the student total, the gender ratio was 50.32% male to 49.68% female. The demographic group makeup of the student population was: Black, 54.05%; White, 32.84%; Hispanic, 11.19%; Asian/Pacific Islander, 1.92%; and American Indian, 0%. For the same school year, 62.15% of the students received free and reduced-cost lunches.

Graduations are generally held at Catawba College's Keppel Auditorium.

== Academics ==
In 2008, Salisbury High School was ranked a Silver Level school by U.S. News & World Report and was also included in the magazine list of top 1000 public schools in the nation. In 2011, for the fifth consecutive year, Salisbury High was listed as one of U.S. News & World Report's Best High Schools.

Salisbury High has nearly 180 students taking Advanced Placement courses, the most of any school in the district. The school offers 16 AP courses during the 2011–2012 school year. Salisbury High also has the highest average SAT score in the school system, with a score of 1480.

The high school was rated a School of Distinction for the 2009–10 school year on the North Carolina State Board of Education's yearly School Report Cards.

== Athletics ==
Salisbury High School is a member of the North Carolina High School Athletic Association (NCHSAA).

In 2010, the school received the NCHSAA Exemplary School Award.

The men's soccer team won the NCHSAA 2A state championship in 2011, defeating Carrboro High School 3–2 in sudden death overtime. The soccer team was 24–1–1 overall for the 2011 season.

== Administration ==
Marvin Moore serves as principal beginning in June, 2020, taking over from Luke Brown. Moore was previously principal at Isenberg Elementary School in Salisbury.

== Notable alumni ==
- Keion Adams (born 1995) — former NFL linebacker
- Bill Baker (1911–2006) — MLB catcher
- Elizabeth Dole (born 1936) — United States Senator 2003–2009
- Vance Honeycutt (born 2003) — MLB center fielder
- Bobby Jackson (born 1973) — former NBA player, assistant coach of the Philadelphia 76ers
- Romar Morris (born 1992) — former NFL and Canadian Football League running back
- Bobby Phillips (born 1975) — former professional basketball player in Belgium and Austria
- Margaret J. Safrit (1935–2023) — kinesiologist, college professor
- Jalon Walker (born 2004) — NFL linebacker for the Atlanta Falcons
