= North Charleston High School =

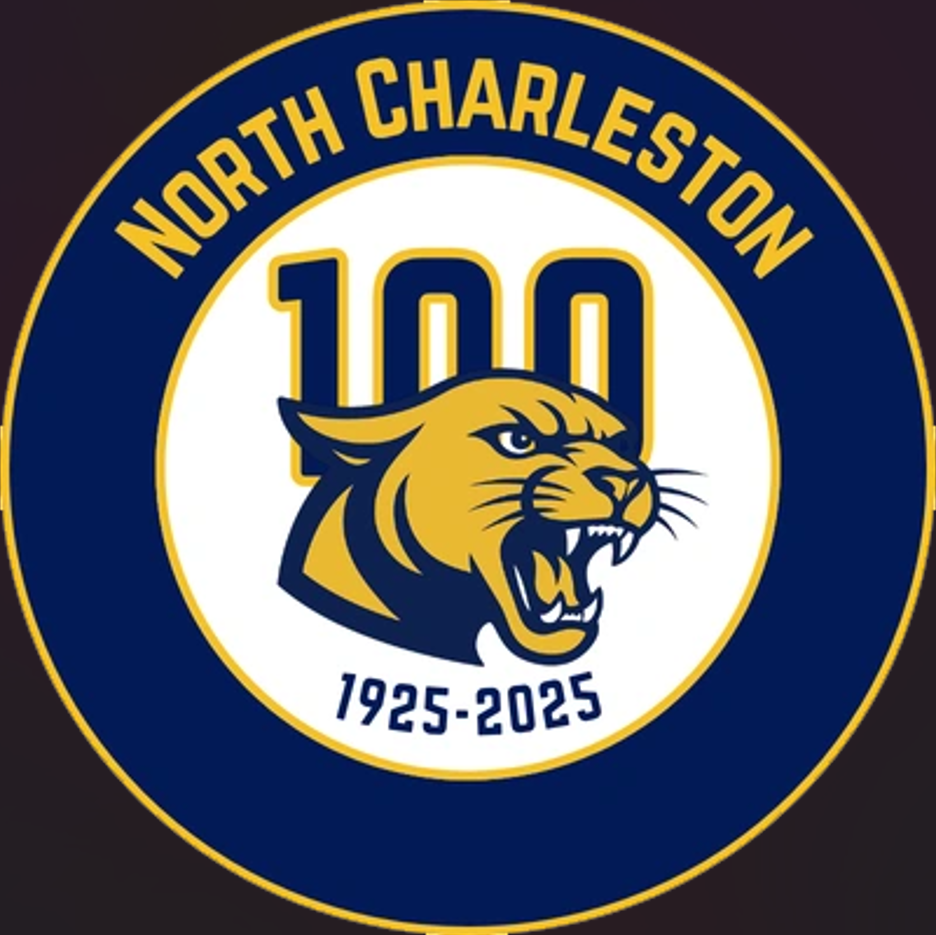
- North Charleston High School 100th Celebration Logo

Location
- 1087 East Montague Avenue; North Charleston, South Carolina 29405; United States; 32.8805°N 79.9787°W

Information
- Other name: NCHS
- Type: Public high school
- Established: 1925 (101 years ago)
- School district: Charleston County School District
- NCES School ID: 450144000251
- Teaching staff: 86.00 (on an FTE basis)
- Grades: 9-12
- Enrollment: 785 (2023-2024)
- Student to teacher ratio: 9.13
- Colors: Blue and gold
- Nickname: Cougars
- Website: nchs.ccsdschools.com

North Charleston High School (NCHS) is a public high school in North Charleston, South Carolina, United States. It is a part of the Charleston County School District (CCSD).

The school previously used the 5,000-seat Attaway-Heinsohn Stadium, named after Alvin F. Heinsohn and Hubert H. Attaway, built in the 1950s for $160,000, and dedicated in 1956. It was located across Montague Avenue from the North Charleston High building. The district announced in 2018 that the stadium will be demolished and replaced with the North Charleston Center for Advanced Studies. North Charleston High games will be played at another stadium with those of other high schools.

Pattison's Academy, a charter school for students aged 5–21 with disabilities, moved into a wing of the NCHS campus in 2018. As of 2018 it had 35 students.

== Notable alumni ==
- Nehemiah Broughton, former NFL running back
- Arnold Goodstein, veteran of Vietnam War and state legislator
- Bob Hudson, former NFL offensive lineman
