= 1998 NBA draft =

Basketball player selection

General information
- Sport: Basketball
- Date: June 24, 1998
- Location: General Motors Place (Vancouver, British Columbia)
- Networks: TNT, TSN

Overview
- 58 total selections in 2 rounds
- League: NBA
- First selection: Michael Olowokandi (Los Angeles Clippers)
- Hall of Famers: 3: SF Vince Carter; PF Dirk Nowitzki; SF Paul Pierce

The 1998 NBA draft took place on June 24, 1998, at General Motors Place in Vancouver, British Columbia, Canada. This draft helped turn around four struggling franchises: the Dallas Mavericks, the Sacramento Kings, the Boston Celtics, and the Toronto Raptors.

The Vancouver Grizzlies and the Toronto Raptors were not able to win the NBA draft lottery; as they were expansion teams, they were not allowed to select first in this draft.

The Mavericks, despite having a talented nucleus of Jason Kidd, Jamal Mashburn and Jimmy Jackson in the mid-1990s, had not had a winning season since 1989-90, which was also the last time they made the playoffs. By the end of the 1997 season, all three players were traded and it was time to rebuild. With the sixth selection in 1998, they drafted Robert Traylor and quickly traded him to the Milwaukee Bucks for Dirk Nowitzki and Pat Garrity. They then traded Garrity in a package to the Phoenix Suns for Steve Nash. With Nash and Nowitzki, the Mavericks quickly went from a lottery team in the late 1990s to a perennial playoff contender throughout the 2000s. Nowitzki went on to win the 2011 NBA Finals with Dallas without Nash, but with Kidd.

Meanwhile, the Raptors were a recent expansion team that had failed to win more than 30 games in its first three seasons. With the fourth pick they selected Antawn Jamison, whom they quickly dealt to the Golden State Warriors for Vince Carter. Carter went on to win Rookie of the Year.

First overall pick Michael Olowokandi from mid-major University of the Pacific is regarded by Sports Illustrated as one of the biggest draft busts in NBA history. As of February 2019, he is the last top selection to come out of a university that is considered mid-major.

Five players from the 1998 draft class played in the NBA All-Star Game at least once in their careers: Nowitzki, Carter, Jamison, Paul Pierce and Rashard Lewis. All of them except Lewis scored at least 20,000 career points.

Carter retired in 2020, making him the last active player drafted in the 1990s to retire. He set the record for most seasons played in the NBA with 22 (although this was later broken by LeBron James), becoming the first player to ever appear in NBA games in four different decades. Nowitzki missed the same four-decade status by nine months, retiring from the Mavericks in April 2019 as the first player to ever spend more than 20 NBA seasons with one team.

== Draft selections ==
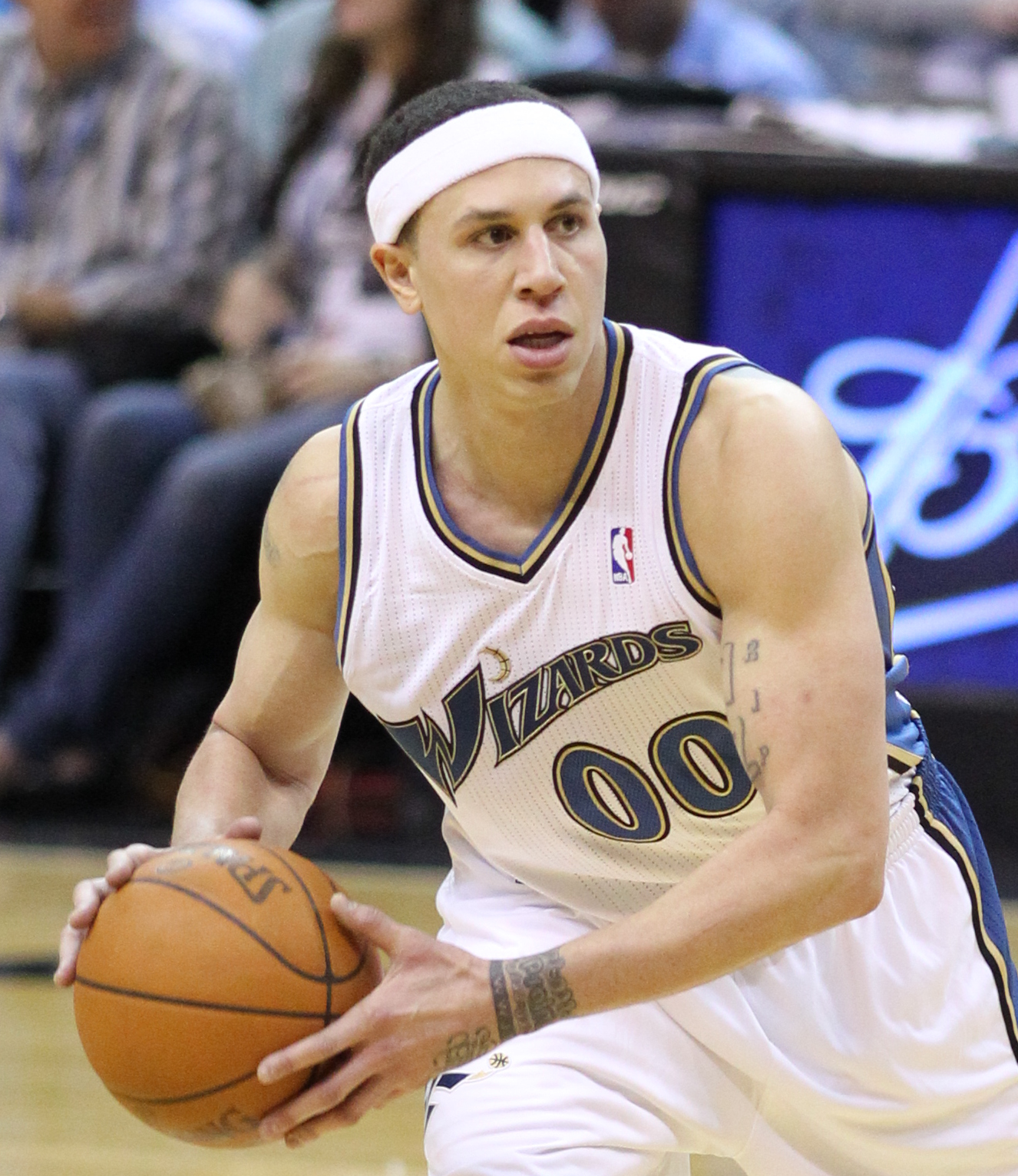
Mike Bibby was selected second overall by the Vancouver Grizzlies.

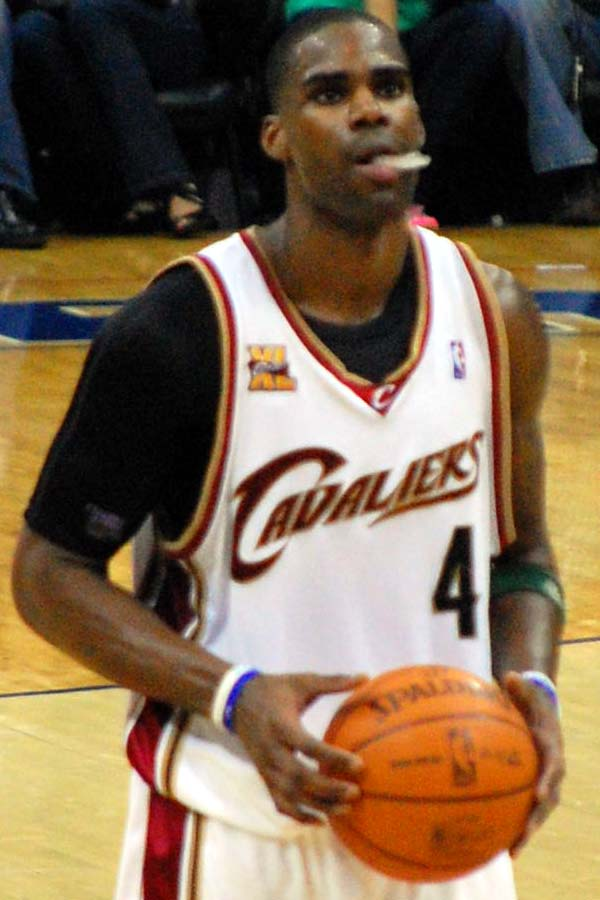
Antawn Jamison was selected 4th overall by the Toronto Raptors (traded to the Golden State Warriors).

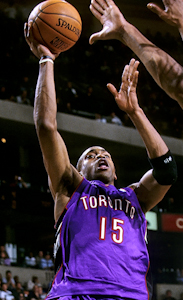
Vince Carter was selected 5th overall by the Golden State Warriors (traded to the Toronto Raptors).

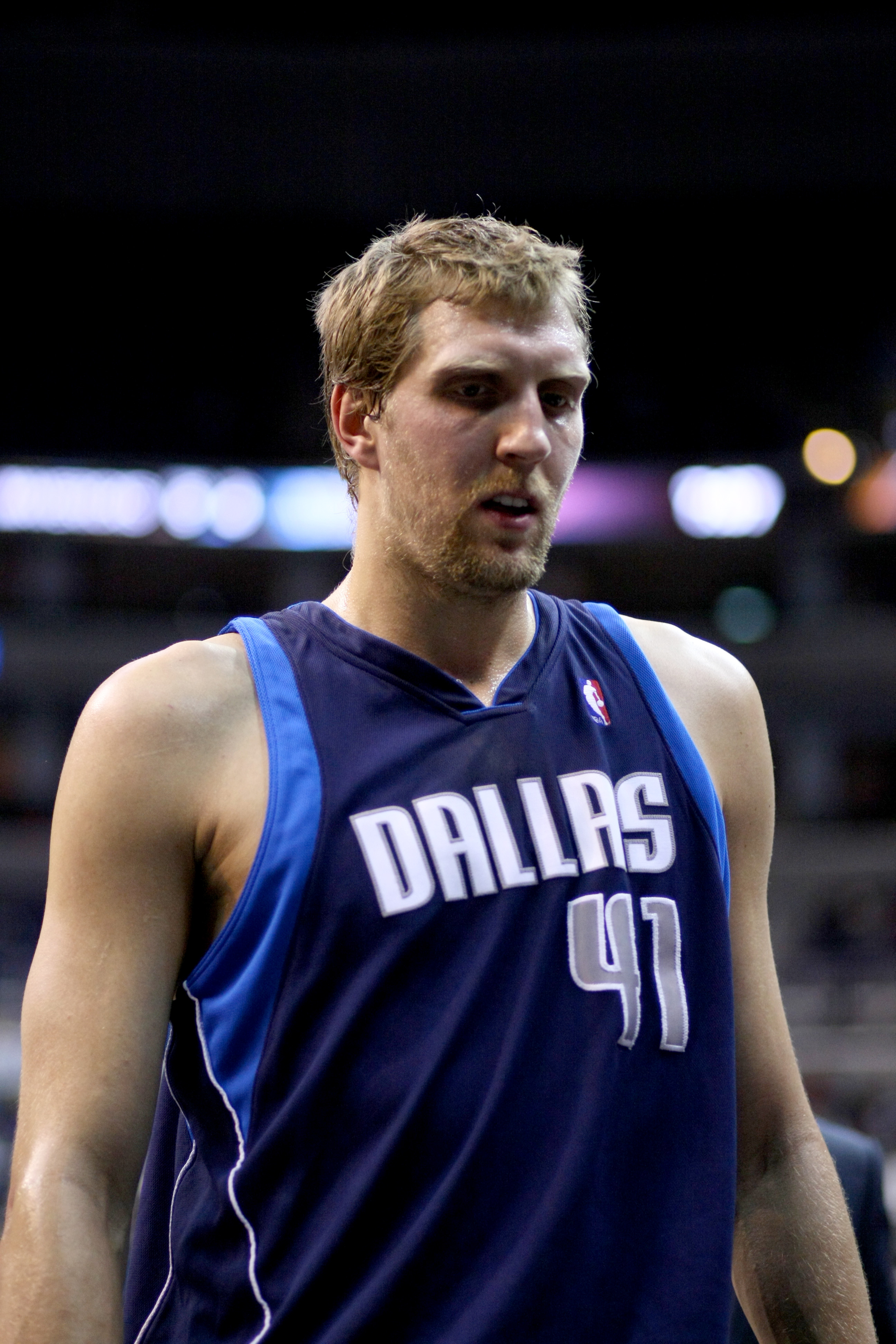
Dirk Nowitzki was selected 9th overall by the Milwaukee Bucks (traded to the Dallas Mavericks).

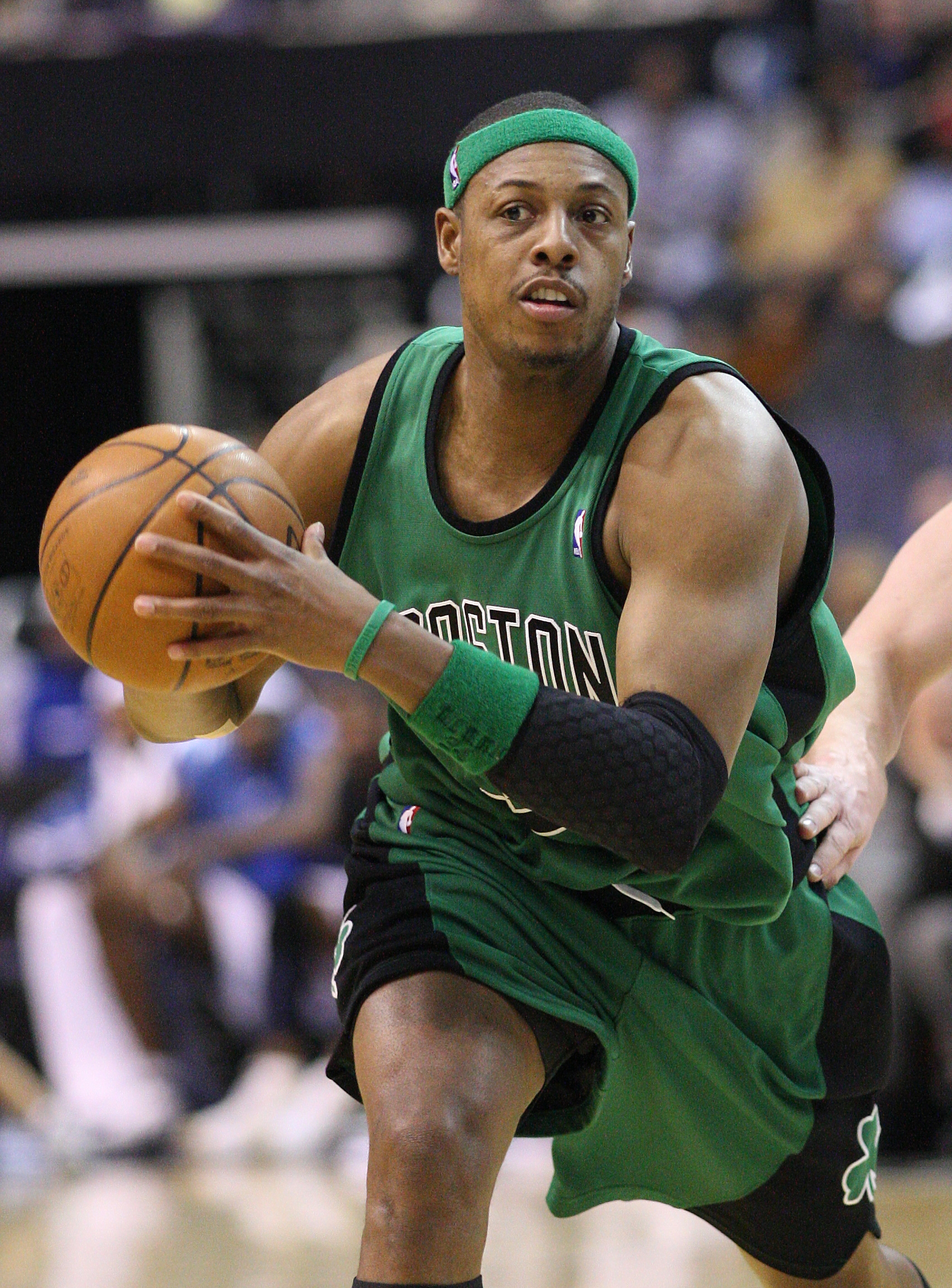
Paul Pierce was selected 10th overall by the Boston Celtics.

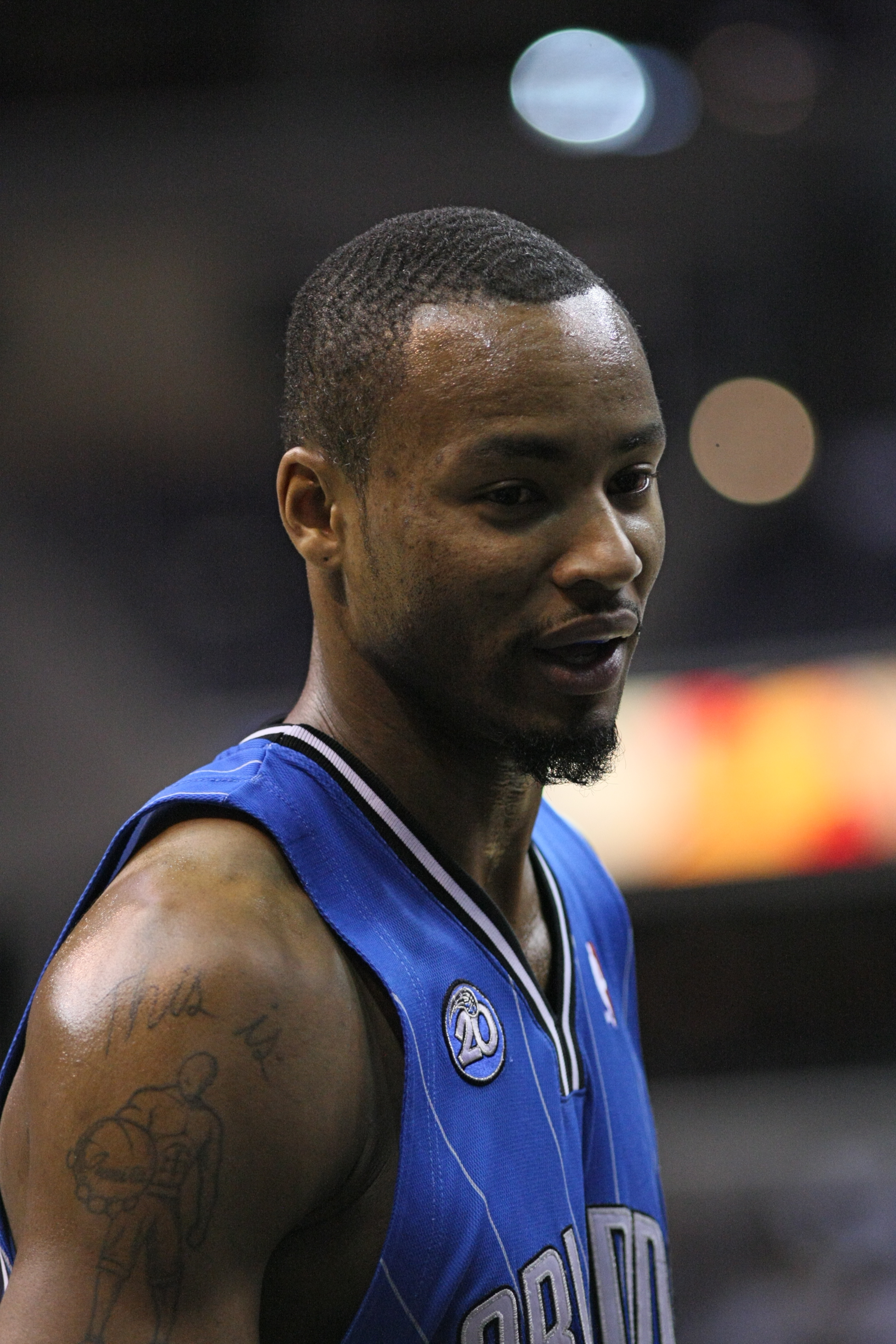
Rashard Lewis was selected 32nd overall by the Seattle SuperSonics.

PG	Point guard	SG	Shooting guard	SF	Small forward	PF	Power forward	C	Center

^	Denotes player who has been inducted to the Naismith Memorial Basketball Hall of Fame
*	Denotes player who has been selected for at least one All-Star Game and All-NBA Team
^{+}	Denotes player who has been selected for at least one All-Star Game
^{#}	Denotes player who has never appeared in an NBA regular-season or playoff game
^{~}	Denotes player who has been selected as Rookie of the Year

Round	Pick	Player	Position	Nationality (Note: Nationality indicates the player's national team or representative nationality. If a player has not competed at the international level, then the nationality indicates the national team which the player is eligible to represent according to FIBA rules.)	NBA team	School/Club team
1	1	Michael Olowokandi	C	Nigeria	Los Angeles Clippers	Pacific (Sr.)
1	2	Mike Bibby	PG	United States	Vancouver Grizzlies	Arizona (So.)
1	3	Raef LaFrentz	C/F	United States	Denver Nuggets	Kansas (Sr.)
1	4	Antawn Jamison^{+}	F	United States	Toronto Raptors (traded to Golden State)	North Carolina (Jr.)
1	5	Vince Carter^^{~}	SF/SG	United States	Golden State Warriors (traded to Toronto)	North Carolina (Jr.)
1	6	Robert Traylor	F/C	United States	Dallas Mavericks (traded to Milwaukee)	Michigan (Jr.)
1	7	Jason Williams	PG	United States	Sacramento Kings	Florida (Jr.)
1	8	Larry Hughes	SG	United States	Philadelphia 76ers	Saint Louis (Fr.)
1	9	Dirk Nowitzki^	PF	Germany	Milwaukee Bucks (traded to Dallas)	DJK Würzburg (Germany, 2nd division)
1	10	Paul Pierce^	SF/SG	United States	Boston Celtics	Kansas (Jr.)
1	11	Bonzi Wells	G/F	United States	Detroit Pistons	Ball State (Sr.)
1	12	Michael Doleac	C	United States	Orlando Magic	Utah (Sr.)
1	13	Keon Clark	F/C	United States	Orlando Magic (from Washington via Golden State; traded to Denver)	UNLV (Sr.)
1	14	Michael Dickerson	SG	United States	Houston Rockets	Arizona (Sr.)
1	15	Matt Harpring	F/G	United States	Orlando Magic (from New Jersey)	Georgia Tech (Sr.)
1	16	Bryce Drew	PG	United States	Houston Rockets (from New York via Portland and Toronto)	Valparaiso (Sr.)
1	17	Radoslav Nesterovič	C	Slovenia	Minnesota Timberwolves	Kinder Bologna (Italy)
1	18	Mirsad Türkcan	PF	Turkey	Houston Rockets (from Portland via Toronto)	Efes Pilsen (Turkey)
1	19	Pat Garrity	PF	United States	Milwaukee Bucks (from Cleveland, traded to Phoenix)	Notre Dame (Sr.)
1	20	Roshown McLeod	SF	United States	Atlanta Hawks	Duke (Sr.)
1	21	Ricky Davis	G/F	United States	Charlotte Hornets	Iowa (Fr.)
1	22	Brian Skinner	F/C	United States	Los Angeles Clippers (from Miami)	Baylor (Sr.)
1	23	Tyronn Lue	PG	United States	Denver Nuggets (from Phoenix traded to L.A. Lakers)	Nebraska (Jr.)
1	24	Felipe López	SG	Dominican Republic	San Antonio Spurs (traded to Vancouver)	St. John's (Sr.)
1	25	Al Harrington	F	United States	Indiana Pacers	St. Patrick's High School (Elizabeth, New Jersey)
1	26	Sam Jacobson	SG	United States	Los Angeles Lakers	Minnesota (Sr.)
1	27	Vladimir Stepania	C	(Georgia (country)) Georgia	Seattle SuperSonics	Olimpija Ljubljana (Slovenia)
1	28	Corey Benjamin	SG	United States	Chicago Bulls	Oregon State (So.)
1	29	Nazr Mohammed	C/F	United States	Utah Jazz (traded to Philadelphia)	Kentucky (Jr.)
2	30	Ansu Sesay	SF	United States	Dallas Mavericks (from Toronto)	Mississippi (Sr.)
2	31	Ruben Patterson	SF	United States	Los Angeles Lakers (from Vancouver)	Cincinnati (Sr.)
2	32	Rashard Lewis^{+}	PF	United States	Seattle SuperSonics (from Denver)	Alief Elsik HS (Houston, Texas)
2	33	Jelani McCoy	F/C	United States	Seattle SuperSonics (from L.A. Clippers)	UCLA (Jr.)
2	34	Shammond Williams	PG	United States	Chicago Bulls (from Golden State)	North Carolina (Sr.)
2	35	Bruno Šundov	C	Croatia	Dallas Mavericks	Split (Croatia)
2	36	Jerome James	C	United States	Sacramento Kings	Florida A&M (Jr.)
2	37	Casey Shaw	C	United States	Philadelphia 76ers	Toledo (Sr.)
2	38	DeMarco Johnson	PF	United States	New York Knicks (from Boston)	Charlotte (Sr.)
2	39	Rafer Alston	PG	United States	Milwaukee Bucks	Fresno State (Jr.)
2	40	Korleone Young	SF	United States	Detroit Pistons	Hargrave Military Academy
2	41	Cuttino Mobley	SG	United States	Houston Rockets	Rhode Island (Sr.)
2	42	Miles Simon	SG	United States	Orlando Magic	Arizona (Sr.)
2	43	Jahidi White	F/C	United States	Washington Wizards	Georgetown (Sr.)
2	44	Sean Marks	PF	New Zealand	New York Knicks	California (Sr.)
2	45	Toby Bailey	SG	United States	Los Angeles Lakers (from New Jersey)	UCLA (Sr.)
2	46	Andrae Patterson	SF	United States	Minnesota Timberwolves	Indiana (Sr.)
2	47	Tyson Wheeler	PG	United States	Toronto Raptors	Rhode Island (Sr.)
2	48	Ryan Stack	C	United States	Cleveland Cavaliers	South Carolina (Sr.)
2	49	Cory Carr	SG	United States	Atlanta Hawks	Texas Tech (Sr.)
2	50	Andrew Betts^{#}	C	United Kingdom	Charlotte Hornets	Long Beach State (Sr.)
2	51	Corey Brewer^{#}	PG	United States	Miami Heat	Oklahoma (Sr.)
2	52	Derrick Dial	SG	United States	San Antonio Spurs	Eastern Michigan (Sr.)
2	53	Greg Buckner	SG	United States	Dallas Mavericks (from Phoenix)	Clemson (Sr.)
2	54	Tremaine Fowlkes	SF	United States	Denver Nuggets (from Indiana)	Fresno State (Sr.)
2	55	Ryan Bowen	SF	United States	Denver Nuggets (from Seattle)	Iowa (Sr.)
2	56	J. R. Henderson	SF	United States	Vancouver Grizzlies (from L.A. Lakers)	UCLA (Sr.)
2	57	Torraye Braggs	PF	United States	Utah Jazz	Xavier (Sr.)
2	58	Maceo Baston	PF	United States	Chicago Bulls	Michigan (Sr.)

== Notable undrafted players ==
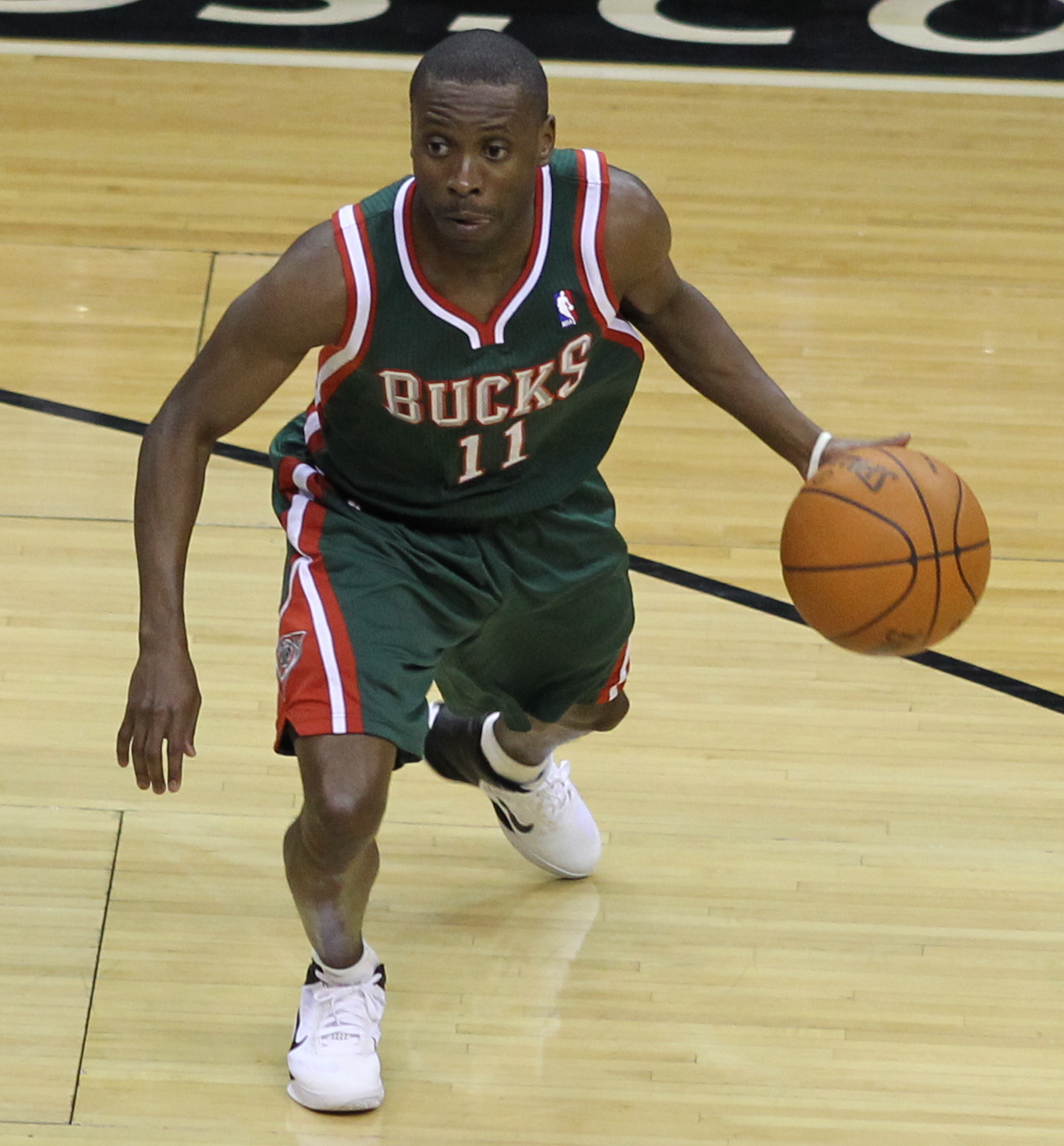
Earl Boykins, a notable undrafted player, is known for being the second shortest player in NBA history.

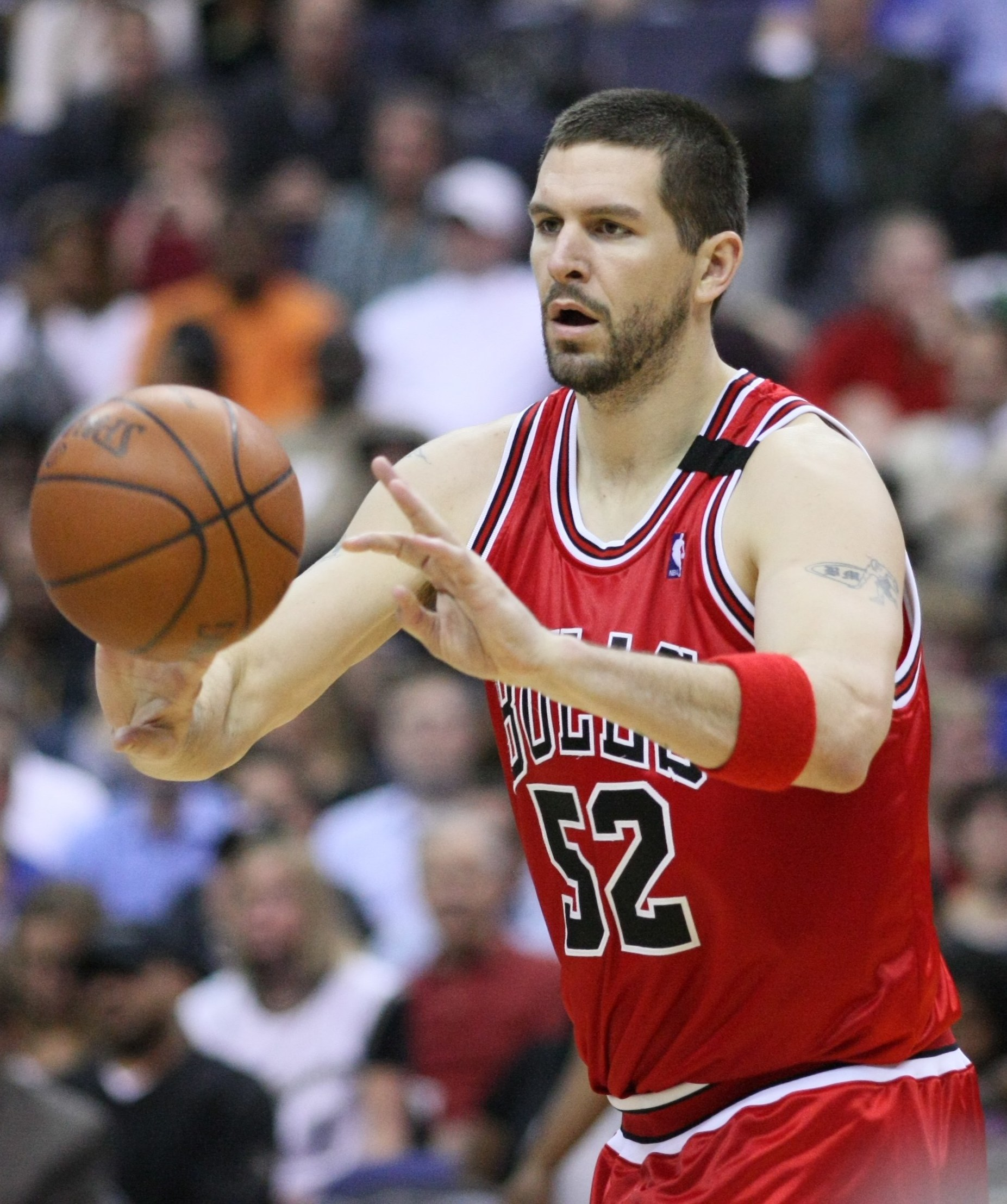
Brad Miller was not drafted but had a successful 14-year career in the NBA that included two All-Star selections.

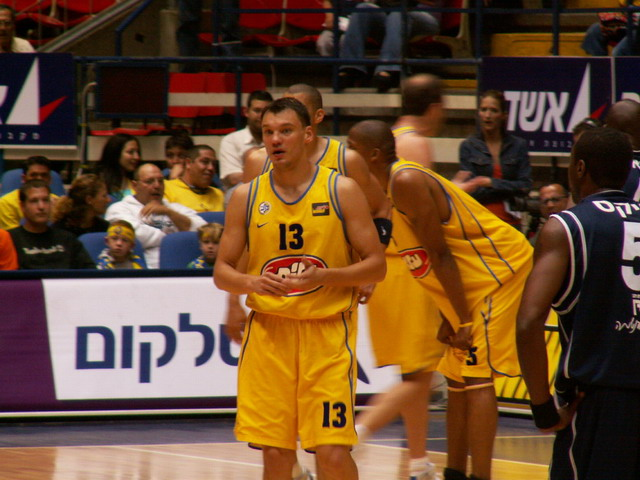
Šarūnas Jasikevičius was not drafted but later played in the NBA and is regarded as one of Europe's all-time greatest basketball players.

These players eligible for the 1998 NBA Draft were not selected but played at least one game in the NBA.

Player	Position	Nationality	School/Club team
Earl Boykins	PG	United States	Eastern Michigan (Sr.)
Gerald Brown	SG	United States	Pepperdine (Sr.)
Anthony Carter	PG	United States	Hawaii (Sr.)
Sean Colson	PG	United States	Charlotte (Sr.)
Steve Goodrich	PF/C	United States	Princeton (Sr.)
Zendon Hamilton	C	United States	St. John's (Sr.)
Randell Jackson	PF	United States	Florida State (Jr.)
Mike James	PG	United States	Duquesne (Sr.)
Šarūnas Jasikevičius	PG	Lithuania	Maryland (Sr.)
Charles Jones	SG	United States	LIU Brooklyn (Sr.)
Mark Jones	SF	United States	UCF (Sr.)
Kelly McCarty	SG	United States	Southern Miss (Sr.)
Slava Medvedenko	PF	Ukraine	Budivelnyk Kyiv (Ukraine)
Brad Miller^{+}	C	United States	Purdue (Sr.)
Makhtar N'Diaye	PF	Senegal	North Carolina (Sr.)
Tyrone Nesby	SF	United States	UNLV (Sr.)
Daniel Santiago	C	Puerto Rico	Saint Vincent (Sr.)
Jeff Sheppard	G	United States	Kentucky (Sr.)
Billy Thomas	SG	United States	Kansas (Sr.)
Óscar Torres	SF/SG	Venezuela	Marinos (Venezuela)

== Early entrants ==
=== College underclassmen ===
Much like last year, this year initially saw 40 total players classified as underclassmen entering the NBA draft. However, seven players from this year's draft would later withdraw their names from entry, with Bud Eley from Southeast Missouri State University, Rico Harris from Los Angeles City College, the Yugoslavian-Greek born Marko Jarić from the Peristeri B.C. of Greece, the Bosnian-Greek born Saša Marković-Theodorakis from the Panionios B.C. in Athens, Greece, Lee Nailon from Texas Christian University, Lamar Odom from the University of Rhode Island, and the Greek born Dimitrios Papanikolaou from the Olympiacos Piraeus B.C. in Greece all withdrawing their entries into this year's draft. Including four different players that came directly from high school into the NBA draft (three of which actually became drafted) and three overseas players that successfully stayed into the NBA draft, the number of underclassmen would jump up from 26 total college players to 33 overall. Regardless, the following college basketball players successfully applied for early draft entrance.

- (United States) Rafer Alston – G, Fresno State (junior)
- (United States) Corey Benjamin – G, Oregon State (sophomore)
- (United States) Mike Bibby – G, Arizona (sophomore)
- (United States) Chandar Bingham – F, Virginia Union (sophomore)
- (United States) Marcus Bullard – G, Auburn Montgomery (junior)
- (United States) Vince Carter – F/G, North Carolina (junior)
- (United States) Wayne Clark – G, Park (freshman)
- (United States) Tim Cole – G, Northeast Mississippi CC (sophomore)
- (United States) Peter Cornell – C, Loyola Marymount (junior)
- (United States) Arthur Davis – G, St. Joseph's (sophomore)
- (United States) Ricky Davis – F/G, Iowa (freshman)
- (United States) Tremaine Fowlkes – F, Fresno State (junior)
- (United States) Larry Hughes – G, Saint Louis (freshman)
- (United States) Randell Jackson – F, Florida State (junior)
- (United States) Jerome James – C, Florida A&M (junior)
- (United States) Antawn Jamison – F, North Carolina (junior)
- (United States) Tyronn Lue – G, Nebraska (junior)
- (United States) Jelani McCoy – F/C, UCLA (junior)
- (United States) Mark Miller – G, UIC (junior)
- (United States) Nazr Mohammed – F/C, Kentucky (junior)
- (United States) Paul Pierce – G/F, Kansas (junior)
- (United States) Adam Roberts – G, San Francisco State (junior)
- (United States) James Spears – F, Shaw (junior)
- (United States) Robert Traylor – F, Michigan (junior)
- (United States) Winfred Walton – F, Fresno State (sophomore)
- (United States) Jason Williams – G, Florida (sophomore)

=== High school players ===
Had Lamar Odom declared entry into this year's draft like he planned on doing, he would not have represented St. Thomas Aquinas High School in New Britain, Connecticut due to him already declaring entry into college this year, but having academic troubles to qualify for collegiate play. That being said, this would be the fourth year in a row where at least one high school player would declare entry into the NBA draft after previously only doing it back in 1975. The following high school players successfully applied for early draft entrance.

- (United States) Al Harrington – F, St. Patrick (Elizabeth, New Jersey)
- (United States) Rashard Lewis – F, Alief Elsik HS (Houston, Texas)
- (United States) Ellis Richardson – G, Polytechnic (Los Angeles, California)
- (United States) Korleone Young – F, Hargrave Military Academy (Chatham, Virginia)

=== International players ===
In addition to the players below, three more players from Greece initially declared entry for this year's draft, but ultimately withdrew their names for one reason or another. The following international players successfully applied for early draft entrance.

- Slava Medvedenko – F, Budivelnyk Kiev (Ukraine)
- Dirk Nowitzki – F, DJK Würzburg (Germany)
- Bruno Šundov – C, Split (Croatia)

== Invited attendees ==
The 1998 NBA draft is considered to be the 21st NBA draft to have utilized what's properly considered the "green room" experience for NBA prospects. The NBA's green room is a staging area where anticipated draftees often sit with their families and representatives, waiting for their names to be called on draft night. Often being positioned either in front of or to the side of the podium (in this case, being positioned somewhere within the General Motors Place in Vancouver, Canada), once a player heard his name, he would walk to the podium to shake hands and take promotional photos with the NBA commissioner. From there, the players often conducted interviews with various media outlets while backstage. From there, the players often conducted interviews with various media outlets while backstage. However, once the NBA draft started to air nationally on TV starting with the 1980 NBA draft, the green room evolved from players waiting to hear their name called and then shaking hands with these select players who were often called to the hotel to take promotional pictures with the NBA commissioner a day or two after the draft concluded to having players in real-time waiting to hear their names called up and then shaking hands with David Stern, the NBA's commissioner at the time. The NBA compiled its list of green room invites through collective voting by the NBA's team presidents and general managers alike, which in this year's case belonged to only what they believed were the top 14 prospects at the time. Despite the smaller amount of invites when compared to the past few years, there would be a notable amount of discrepancies between the missed invite of Dirk Nowitzki (and arguably Brad Miller, despite the latter invite being undrafted) alongside the late first round draft selection of Nazr Mohammed and the second round selection of Rashard Lewis, not to mention one of the worst #1 draft pick selections ever made in Michael Olowokandi. With that in mind, the following players were invited to attend this year's draft festivities live and in person.

- (United States) Mike Bibby – PG, Arizona
- (United States) Vince Carter – SG/SF, North Carolina
- (United States) Michael Doleac – C, Utah
- (United States) Pat Garrity – PF, Notre Dame
- (United States) Larry Hughes – SG, Saint Louis
- (United States) Antawn Jamison – SF/PF, North Carolina
- (United States) Raef LaFrentz – PF/C, Kansas
- (United States) Rashard Lewis – PF, Alief Elsik High School (Houston, Texas)
- (United States) Nazr Mohammed – PF/C, Kentucky
- (Slovenia) Radoslav Nesterovič – C, Kinder Bologna (Italy)
- (Nigeria) Michael Olowokandi – C, Pacific
- (United States) Paul Pierce – SG/SF, Kansas
- (United States) Robert Traylor – PF/C, Michigan
- (United States) Bonzi Wells – SG/SF, Ball State

== See also ==
- List of first overall NBA draft picks
