= Alief Elsik High School =

Public school in Texas, United States

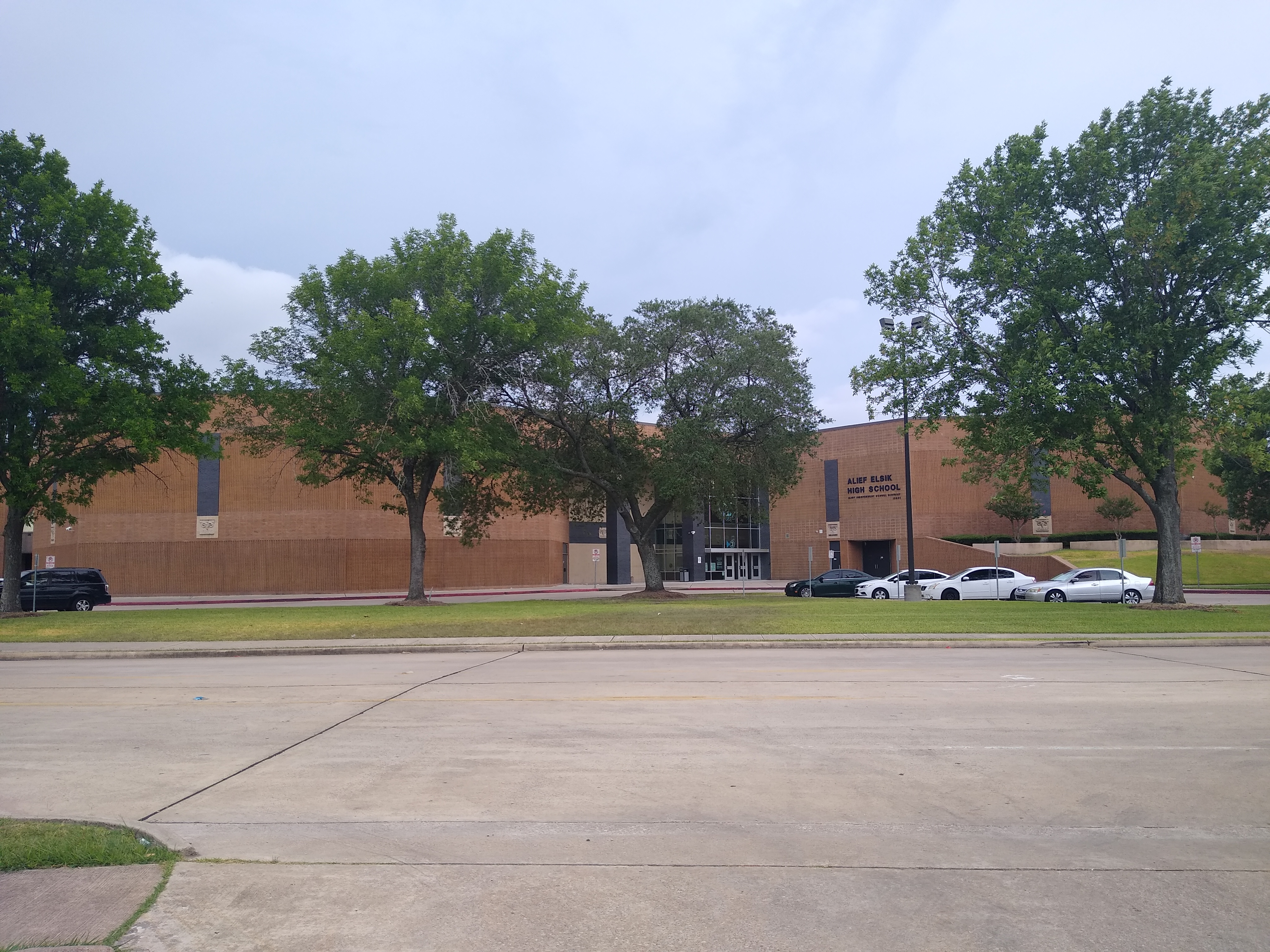

Location
- Main campus: 12601 High Star Drive; Houston, TX 77072-1197; Ninth grade center: 6767 S. Dairy Ashford; Houston, TX 77072; 29.710°N 95.603°W

Information
- Type: Public
- Motto: "Champions... Leaving a legacy!"
- Established: 1975
- School district: Alief Independent School District
- Principal: Andrew Bailey
- Teaching staff: 236.85 (FTE)
- Grades: 9–12
- Enrollment: 4,119 (2023–2024)
- Student to teacher ratio: 17.39
- Campus: City: Large
- Colors: Columbia blue and white
- Athletics: Football, basketball, track, tennis, golf, baseball, softball, soccer
- Mascot: Rocky the Ram
- Team name: Rams
- Rival: Alief Hastings High School
- Yearbook: Ramblings
- Website: elsik.aliefisd.net/o/ehs/
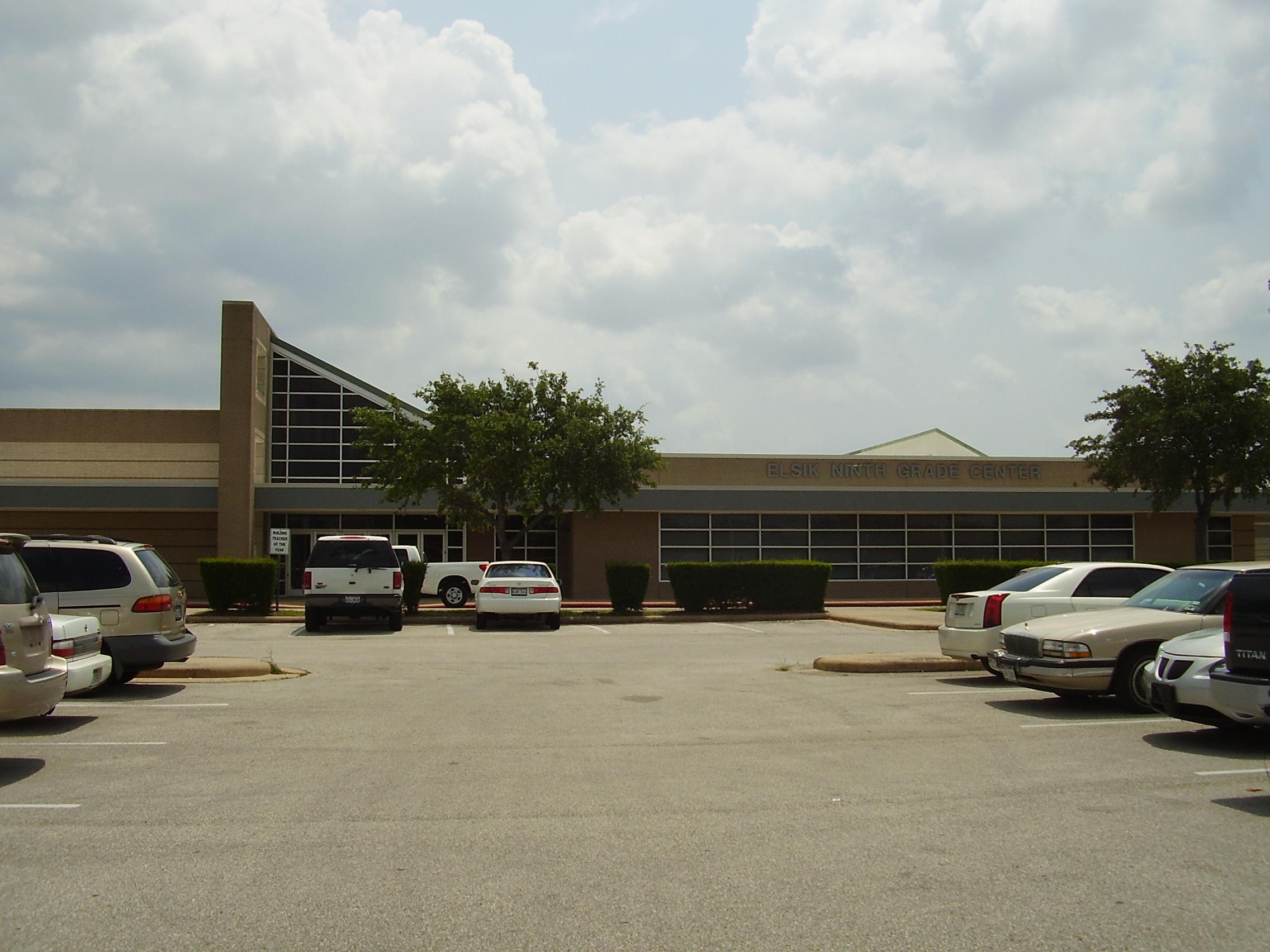
- Elsik 9th Grade Center

Alief Elsik High School is a high school in the Alief region of Houston, Texas, United States.

Elsik is divided into two campuses: the main campus (12601 High Star in Houston, zip code 77072), and the Alief Elsik Ninth Grade Center (located at 6767 South Dairy Ashford, city of Houston, 77072), which serves ninth graders. Both campuses, which are in the Alief Independent School District, serve grades 9 through 12. The ninth grade campus is located in the International District although the main high school building is outside of it.

In the 2021–2022 school year, Elsik received a score of 68 out of 100 from the Texas Education Agency.

== History ==
Campuses in Houston

Elsik opened in 1975 on the same campus as Hastings High School, as what is now known as Hastings South. The first year Elsik only enrolled freshmen, and added classes every year thereafter, until it had all four grades, with the first freshman class from 1975–76 graduating in 1979. While the two schools were divided by a large courtyard and bus run, there was frequent contact with students from the other campus, which made for interesting times during sporting events between the two schools. Certain classes were shared by both Hastings and Elsik, such as machine shop, art, and Accelerated Learning or "Honor Roll" classes.

A separate school building partially opened in January 1982, one block away from Hastings. The original portions were known at the time as the North House and the C Building. The remainder of the building, known as the South House, opened in January, 1983. During the construction of the South House, temporary walls existed in the South Cafeteria and classroom wing, dividing the completed portion of the building from that portion still under construction. Even after the new building was complete, certain classes and sporting facilities were shared between the two schools.

In the late 1980s, a separate building was built bridging the two schools on land formerly used for physical education. This new building was almost like a separate school and included its own cafeteria. It mainly filled the need for shared classes in one centralized, easily accessible location for students. It is known as the Annex. Elsik High School is one of the largest high schools in the state.

== Academics ==
For the 2017–2018 school year, the school received a score of 71 out of 100 from the Texas Education Agency. It received a score of 79 and a C grade in 2018–2019. The school was not rated in 2019–2020 and 2020–2021. It received a score of 68 in 2021–2022. The school was not rated in 2022–2023.

== Demographics ==
In the 2022–2023 school year, there were 4,118 students. 0.8% were American Indian/Alaska Native, 8.6% were Asian, 24.7% were Black, 62.7% were Hispanic, 0.1% were Native Hawaiian or Pacific Islander, 2.7% were White, and 0.4% were two or more races. 80.8% of students were eligible for free or reduced price lunch.

== Feeder patterns ==
All Alief ISD elementary, intermediate, and middle schools feed into Elsik, as high school placement in Alief ISD is determined by a lottery: the lottery can result in either Elsik, Hastings, or Taylor. If a student was selected by lottery to attend a high school different from the high school of a relative currently attending or graduated from, the student may opt to transfer to that respective school. Students may also complete an application for the district's magnet high schools, Kerr or Alief Early College High School .

The lottery system was originally developed to create balanced demographics in Alief's high schools when it was found that there was no simple geographic method of dividing the school district that would be fair and equitable. As a result of the lottery, the demographics of Alief's high schools are virtually identical. However, it is common that neighbors who had attended the same elementary and middle schools must instead go to different high schools. Alief's relatively small geographic area permits the lottery in that anyone in the school district has reasonable access to the high schools. A similar lottery in a larger school districts would result in placing a much larger burden on students as they would have to travel farther.

Neighborhoods served by AISD include Alief, most of the New Chinatown, most of Westchase, Bellaire West, and most of Leawood and the Alief community center.

== Notable alumni ==
- Christopher Ayres, voice actor
- Beyoncé, singer
- Burnie Burns, podcaster and cofounder of Rooster Teeth
- Carmen Cusack, actress
- Adaora Elonu, professional basketball player
- Chinemelu Elonu, professional basketball player
- Donovan Greer, professional football player
- Jennifer Haley, playwright
- Warrick Holdman, professional football player
- Rashard Lewis, professional basketball player
- Lizzo, singer
- Rasika Mathur, comedian
- Janine Nabers, playwright
- Tobe Nwigwe, musician
- Kelly Rowland, singer
- Elliot Segal, disc jockey
- Dennis Kuithe, professional football player
