= HTMS =

HTMS may refer to:

- The ICAO code of Moshi Airport, an airport in northeastern Tanzania
- Initialism of His Thai Majesty's Ship, the ship prefix for ships in the Royal Thai Navy
- Hewitt-Trussville Middle School, Alabama, United States
