= Whaley Hall =

American football player (1941–2015)

Profile
- Position: Offensive guard

Personal information
- Born: September 6, 1941; Trussville, Alabama, U.S.
- Died: March 7, 2015 (aged 73); Hampton, Virginia, U.S.
- Listed height: 6 ft 2 in (1.88 m)
- Listed weight: 242 lb (110 kg)

Career information
- High school: Hewitt-Trussville (AL)
- College: Ole Miss
- NFL draft: 1963: 4th round, 48th overall pick
- AFL draft: 1963: 14th round, 110th overall pick

Career history
- Dallas Cowboys (1964); Philadelphia Bulldogs (1965-1966)

Awards and highlights
- Second-team All-American (1963); First-team All-SEC (1963)

William Whaley Hall (September 6, 1941 – March 7, 2015) was an American football offensive tackle in the National Football League (NFL) for the Dallas Cowboys. He also was a member of the Philadelphia Bulldogs in the Continental Football League (COFL). He played college football at the University of Mississippi.

== Early life ==
Hall attended Hewitt-Trussville High School, where he competed in football (tackle and fullback) and baseball (pitcher). He accepted a football scholarship from the University of Mississippi.

In 1962, he was a two-way tackle on a team that went undefeated (10–0), won a Southeastern Conference title and a share of the national championship.

As a senior, he was named co-captain of a team that repeated as Southeastern Conference champions and played in the 1964 Sugar Bowl. He was voted as the SEC Most Outstanding Lineman by the Birmingham Touchdown Club. He played three seasons, helping his team achieve a 26-3-2 record and receive invitations to two Sugar Bowls and one Cotton Bowl.

In 1995, he was inducted into the Ole Miss Sports Hall of Fame.

== Professional career ==
=== Dallas Cowboys ===
Hall was selected by the Dallas Cowboys in the fourth round (48th overall) of the 1963 NFL draft with a future draft pick, which allowed the team to draft him before his college eligibility was over. In 1964, he made the team as a backup offensive guard, but did not play a down as a rookie. He was released before the start of the 1965 season.

=== Philadelphia Bulldogs ===
In 1965, he signed with the Philadelphia Bulldogs of the Continental Football League. The next year, he helped the team win the league's championship.

== Personal life ==
Whaley died on March 7, 2015, after an extended illness at age 73.
