= Jay Barker =

American gridiron football player (born 1972)

Profile
- Position: Quarterback

Personal information
- Born: July 20, 1972 (age 54); Birmingham, Alabama, U.S.
- Listed height: 6 ft 3 in (1.91 m)
- Listed weight: 220 lb (100 kg)

Career information
- High school: Hewitt-Trussville (Trussville, Alabama)
- College: Alabama (1990–1994)
- NFL draft: 1995: 5th round, 160th overall pick

Career history
- Green Bay Packers (1995)*; New England Patriots (1995–1996); Carolina Panthers (1996–1997); Toronto Argonauts (1998–2000); Birmingham Thunderbolts (2001)
- * Offseason or practice squad member only

Awards and highlights
- National champion (1992); Johnny Unitas Golden Arm Award (1994); Third-team All-American (1994); SEC Player of the Year (1994); First-team All-SEC (1994)

Harry Jerome "Jay" Barker (born July 20, 1972) is an American former professional football player who was a quarterback in the Canadian Football League (CFL). He played college football for the Alabama Crimson Tide, where he won a national championship in 1992 and earned third-team All-American honors in 1994. After his playing career, he became a Birmingham radio personality.

== Early life ==
Barker attended Hewitt-Trussville High School in Trussville, Alabama, where he was a standout three-sport athlete in football, basketball, and baseball. He earned all-area honors and honorable mention all-state recognition in football. Playing in a wishbone offense, he completed 82 of 142 passes for 1,320 yards and 12 touchdowns. Initially used in multiple roles, including defensive back, running back, and wide receiver, he did not become the team’s starting quarterback until his senior season. He was a four-year varsity letterman across all three sports.

== College career ==
In 1990, Barker enrolled at the University of Alabama and played college football under head coach Gene Stallings. After redshirting his first season, he served as the primary backup to Danny Woodson before eventually taking over the starting role. He made his first collegiate start against LSU, leading Alabama to a victory. Barker then guided Alabama to wins in its final three games of the season, including the 1991 Blockbuster Bowl against the Colorado Buffaloes.

By 1992, Barker had established himself as Alabama’s leader at quarterback, guiding the Crimson Tide to a perfect 13–0 season. The run included a victory over Florida in the SEC Championship Game and a dominant 34–13 win over No. 1 Miami in the 1993 Sugar Bowl.

In 1993, Barker started the first seven games of the season, posting a 6–0–1 record before an injury sidelined him for the next two games. He later returned in a reserve role against Mississippi State in a victory. Barker then started against rival Auburn, entering the game with a 23–0–1 record as a starting quarterback, but Alabama suffered its first loss of the season, falling 22–14. He was injured again during the game and missed the final two contests of the season. He finished the year appearing in nine games with eight starts.

The 1994 season saw Barker lead Alabama through an undefeated regular season before a loss to Florida in the SEC Championship Game. He concluded his collegiate career on a high note, guiding the Crimson Tide to a 24–17 victory over Ohio State in the 1995 Florida Citrus Bowl. In the game, he threw a game-winning touchdown pass to Sherman Williams for a 50-yard go-ahead score in the final minute. For his performance that season, he earned the Johnny Unitas Golden Arm Award and finished fifth in Heisman Trophy voting.

Over his career, Barker completed 402 of 706 passes for 5,689 yards, with 26 touchdowns and 24 interceptions, along with two rushing touchdowns. In 38 starts, he compiled a 35–2–1 record, which stood as an NCAA record for most wins by a starting quarterback at the time before being surpassed by Peyton Manning in 1997.

== Professional career ==
Pre-draft measurables
Height	Weight	Arm length	Hand span	40-yard dash	10-yard split	20-yard split	20-yard shuttle	Vertical jump
6 ft 2 3/8 in (1.89 m)	212 lb (96 kg)	31 5/8 in (0.80 m)	10 in (0.25 m)	4.94 s	1.77 s	2.86 s	4.31 s	27.0 in (0.69 m)

=== Green Bay Packers ===
Barker was drafted by the Green Bay Packers in the fifth round (160th overall) of the 1995 NFL draft but was released on August 21, 1995, prior to the regular season.

=== New England Patriots ===
On August 28, 1995, Barker signed with the New England Patriots and was elevated to the active roster on September 28. He re-signed with the team on May 23, 1996, but lost the backup quarterback competition to Scott Zolak and was released following the preseason on August 25.

=== Carolina Panthers ===
On August 26, 1996, Barker signed with the Carolina Panthers, who waived Kelly Stouffer to make room for him. He served as the third-string quarterback behind Kerry Collins and Steve Beuerlein but did not appear in a game. After the 1997 preseason, Barker was released in favor of Shane Matthews.

=== Toronto Argonauts ===
On April 28, 1998, Barker signed with the Toronto Argonauts of the Canadian Football League. He began the season as the starting quarterback while regular starter Kerwin Bell was recovering from injury. After four starts and a 1–3 record, he returned to the role of primary backup to Bell. In 1999, he dressed for all 18 games and made 11 starts. He set career highs in all passing categories, completing 149 of 270 passes for 2,023 yards with eight touchdowns and eight interceptions, while also adding 371 rushing yards and two touchdowns. On December 15, 1999, he re-signed for the 2000 season, but made just one start against the Montreal Alouettes, where he suffered a significant knee injury. On January 5, 2001, Barker was granted his release.

=== Birmingham Thunderbolts ===
On January 7, 2001, Barker was signed by the Birmingham Thunderbolts in the XFL as part of the XFL Player Allocation and Selection system. Barker, a territorial selection and native of Birmingham, Alabama, began the season as the backup quarterback to Casey Weldon and quickly became popular with local fans. In the season-opening loss to the Memphis Maniax, fans chanted “We want Barker.”

Barker made his Birmingham debut against the San Francisco Demons in Week 5 of a 39–10 loss, replacing Weldon and going 5-of-11 for 106 yards with one touchdown and one interception. His touchdown came on a 92-yard pass to Stepfret Williams, which stood as the longest touchdown pass of the season. After Weldon was lost for the season with an injury against the Los Angeles Xtreme, Barker took over but struggled, going 2-of-5 for nine yards with two interceptions. Barker earned his first start the following week against the Las Vegas Outlaws, completing 17-of-32 passes for 141 yards and an interception in a 34–12 defeat. In his second start against the Chicago Enforcers, he went 13-of-17 for 169 yards with an interception and added a 10-yard carry, but suffered a concussion and was lost for the remainder of the season.

== Radio career ==
Barker was an analyst for ESPN Radio, and formerly an on-air personality for WJOX in Birmingham. Both he and Al Del Greco, a former Auburn placekicker, hosted the Opening Drive program on WJOX, along with Tony Kurre until 2018.

== Career statistics ==
=== Professional ===
==== CFL ====
Year	Team	Games			Passing								Rushing			
Year	Team	GD	GS	Record	Cmp	Att	Pct	Yds	Y/A	TD	Int	Rtg	Att	Yds	Avg	TD
1998	TOR	18	4	1–3	104	174	59.8	1,276	7.3	3	8	69.0	34	176	5.2	3
1999	TOR	18	11	5–6	149	270	55.2	2,023	7.5	8	8	76.8	52	371	7.1	2
2000	TOR	10	1	0–1	16	26	61.5	134	5.2	1	5	35.3	7	29	4.1	0
Career		46	16	6–10	269	470	57.2	3,433	7.3	11	19	71.2	93	576	6.2	5

==== XFL ====
Year	Team	Games			Passing								Rushing			
Year	Team	GP	GS	Record	Cmp	Att	Pct	Yds	Y/A	TD	Int	Rtg	Att	Yds	Avg	TD
2001	BIR	4	2	0–2	37	65	56.9	425	6.5	1	5	49.8	5	26	5.2	0
Career		4	2	0–2	37	65	56.9	425	6.5	1	5	49.8	5	26	5.2	0

=== College ===
Season	Team	Games			Passing								Rushing			
Season	Team	GP	GS	Record	Cmp	Att	Pct	Yds	Y/A	TD	Int	Rtg	Att	Yds	Avg	TD
1990	Alabama	0	0	—	Redshirted (redshirt)											
1991	Alabama	10	4	4–0	33	66	50.0	554	8.4	1	3	116.4	48	22	0.5	0
1992	Alabama	13	13	13–0	132	243	54.3	1,614	6.6	7	9	112.2	64	–94	–1.5	0
1993	Alabama	9	8	6–1–1	98	171	57.3	1,525	8.9	4	7	131.8	42	–77	–1.8	1
1994	Alabama	13	13	12–1	139	226	61.5	1,996	8.8	14	5	151.7	87	–143	–1.6	1
Career		45	38	35–2–1	402	706	56.9	5,689	8.1	26	24	130.0	241	–92	–1.2	2

== Personal life ==
From 1995 to 2007, he was married to Amy DiGiovanna, with whom he has four children.

In 2008, Barker married American country musician Sara Evans. The couple lived in Mountain Brook, Alabama, a suburb of Birmingham, with his four children and Evans' three children.

On January 15, 2022, Barker was arrested on domestic violence charges after allegedly attempting to strike Evans and another individual with his vehicle. The report also indicated that Barker and Evans were separated at the time. Evans filed for divorce in August 2021, citing "irreconcilable differences and inappropriate marital conduct." In March 2024, Evans and Barker announced they had reconciled.

Barker's daughter, Sarah Ashlee Barker, played college basketball for two seasons with the Georgia Lady Bulldogs before transferring to Alabama, where she played three more seasons. In her final collegiate game, she scored an Alabama-record 45 points in a double-overtime loss to the Maryland Terrapins on March 24, 2025, in the second round of the NCAA tournament. She later became a professional basketball player in the WNBA after being selected in the 2025 WNBA draft. On May 12, 2026 she scored a buzzer beater to give the WNBA expansion team Portland Fire their first victory.

Barker's son, Braxton Barker, played quarterback for Alabama from 2018 to 2021. He redshirted in 2018 and did not appear in games during the 2019 and 2020 seasons before playing in one game in 2021, completing his only collegiate pass for 10 yards. He later served on the Alabama coaching staff as a football analyst and quarterbacks assistant.
