= Justin Tubbs =

American professional basketball player (born 1987)

Beirut Club
- Position: Point guard

Personal information
- Born: November 19, 1987 (age 38) Birmingham, Alabama, U.S.
- Listed height: 6 ft 3 in (1.91 m)
- Listed weight: 200 lb (91 kg)

Career information
- High school: Hewitt-Trussville (Trussville, Alabama)
- College: Alabama (2006–2008); East Tennessee State (2009–2011)
- NBA draft: 2011: undrafted
- Playing career: 2011–present

Career history
- 2011–2012: MIA Academy
- 2012: Maccabi K/B
- 2012–2013: Sauk Valley Predators
- 2013–2014: Ottawa SkyHawks
- 2014: SPO Rouen Basket
- 2014: Crailsheim Merlins
- 2014: Halifax Rainmen
- 2014–2015: Panionios
- 2015–2016: Homenetmen
- 2016: Hunan Yongsheng
- 2016–2018: Al Shamal
- 2018: Texas Legends
- 2019–present: Beirut Club

Career highlights
- NBL Canada Newcomer of the Year (2014)

Justin Tubbs (born November 19, 1987) is an American professional basketball player who is currently playing for Beirut Club of the Lebanese Basketball League. He was selected by the Rio Grande Valley Vipers as the 115th overall pick in the 2011 NBA Development League Draft. Tubbs played at the collegiate level with Alabama and East Tennessee State, known as one of the best pure athletes in the Atlantic Sun Conference following his transfer. He also represented Hewitt-Trussville High School through his early years. Following the 2011 NBA draft, Tubbs signed with MIA Academy.

== High school career ==
Tubbs attended Hewitt-Trussville High School in Trussville, Alabama. He averaged 16.9 points and 4.0 rebounds at the conclusion of his last season with the Huskies. During his time with Hewitt-Trussilve, Tubbs garnered All-County, All-Area, and All-Regional honors. Against the Carver High School Mighty Rams, he most notably scored a career-high 46 points. Tubbs finished with a 46.4% field goal percentage on three-pointers during his time under head coach Bo Coln.

== Collegiate career ==
Tubbs officially signed with the Alabama Crimson Tide men's basketball team on June 30, 2006, recruited by Philip Pearson. In his freshman season, he averaged just 3.3 points, 0.8 rebounds, and 0.3 assists. He continued to make little impact on the program as his second year came to a close, with 3.1 points, 1.2 rebounds, and 0.3 assists on average. However, he was still named an Academic All-SEC Pick in his time with the Crimson Tide. In early 2008, Tubbs made the decision to transfer to East Tennessee State University, but Buccaneers coach Murry Bartow officially announced the move in June. After his junior season, the first with ETSU, Tubbs averaged 12.1 points, 3.8 rebounds and 0.6 assists. On November 25, 2009, he scored a career-high 29 points against Charleston. He was considered the best pure athlete in the Atlantic Sun Conference at the time. In his final year with the Buccaneers, Tubbs averaged 10.5 points 4.6 rebounds, and 0.4 assists.

== Professional career ==
Following his college career, Tubbs went undrafted in the 2011 NBA draft. He later entered the 2011 NBA Development League Draft, selected by the Rio Grande Valley Vipers with the 3rd pick in the 8th round. The team dropped him from their roster on November 21, 2011.

He signed with BC MIA Academy of the Georgian Superliga for the 2010–2011 season. Tubbs was named to the 2012 All-Star team and scored 18 points, ranking second on the team. He was placed on the "Legionaries" roster with Jeremy Richardson, Larry Blair, and Keyon Carter.

On August 29, 2013, the Ottawa SkyHawks officially signed Tubbs after leaving the Sauk Valley Predators of the Premier Basketball League. He was marked as one of the best dunkers with head coach Kevin Keathley saying, "Justin is one of the most athletically gifted players I've came across in my coaching career." Tubbs was featured in SportsCenter on several occasions leading to his debut.

On December 20, 2014, he signed with Greek club Panionios.

In October 2015, Tubbs signed with the Lebanese-Armenian club Homenetmen of the Lebanese Basketball League.

=== The Basketball Tournament ===
In 2017, Tubbs played for The CITI Team of The Basketball Tournament. The Basketball Tournament is an annual $2 million winner-take-all tournament broadcast on ESPN.
