= Hewitt-Trussville High School =

Location
- 6450 Husky Parkway; Trussville, Alabama 35173; United States; 33.6651654°N 86.5906604°W

Information
- Type: Public
- Established: 1925 (101 years ago)
- School board: Trussville City Schools
- CEEB code: 012675
- Principal: Aaron King
- Teaching staff: 93.90 (FTE)
- Grades: 9–12
- Enrollment: 1,597 (2023–2024)
- Student to teacher ratio: 17.01
- Campus: Rural
- Colors: Red, gray, white
- Athletics: AHSAA Class 7A
- Nickname: Huskies
- Rivals: Thompson High School, Hoover High School
- Feeder schools: Hewitt-Trussville Middle School
- Website: hths.tcsk12.us

Hewitt-Trussville High School (HTHS) is a four-year public high school in the city of Trussville, Alabama. It is the only high school in Trussville City Schools and is named for the early local educator Robert Hewitt. School colors are red and gray, and the athletic teams are called the Huskies. HTHS competes in Alabama High School Athletic Association Class 7A athletics.

== Recognition ==
HTHS has been recognized by a variety of sources as one of the best high schools in Alabama:

- SchoolDigger ranks HTHS 8th out of 351 high schools in the state of Alabama and 4th among high schools in the Birmingham area.
- HTHS is one of 12 Alabama schools included in the Washington Post's 2016 list of America's Most Challenging High Schools.
- Newsweek includes HTHS among the 20 Alabama schools selected for its list of America's Best High Schools.
- U.S. News & World Report ranks HTHS 13th among Alabama high schools and classifies it as a silver medal school.
- HTHS was named a National Blue Ribbon School by the U.S. Department of Education, the highest recognition a school can receive from the department in 1992 and 2020.

== Student profile ==
Enrollment in grades 9-12 for the 2020-2021 School Year was logged at 1,548 students. Approximately 75% of students are white, 20% are African-American, 2% are Asian-American, 1% are Hispanic, and 1% are multiracial. Roughly 12% of students qualify for free or reduced price lunch.

HTHS has a graduation rate of 97%, and 75% of students attend a four-year college or university upon graduation. Approximately 95% of students meet or exceed proficiency standards in both reading and mathematics. The average ACT score for HTHS students is 27 and the average SAT composite is 1280.

== Curriculum ==
Approximately 52% of students take one or more of the following Advanced Placement courses:

- American Government & Politics
- Art Studio
- Biology
- Calculus AB
- Calculus BC
- Chemistry
- English Language & Composition
- English Literature & Composition
- Environmental Science
- Latin
- Macroeconomics
- Microeconomics
- Physics B
- Physics C
- Spanish
- Statistics
- US History
- World history

Students can also take advantage of six different career-focused academies:

- Academy of Business & Finance, which includes dual enrollment in UAB courses and a paid internship
- Biomedical Sciences Academy, based on the nationally recognized Project Lead the Way curriculum
- Electrical Construction Academy, leading to both NCCER and OSHA certifications
- Engineering Academy
- Hospitality & Culinary Arts Academy
- Information Technology Academy, leading to the Microsoft Office Specialist or Adobe Certified Associate credential

== History ==
Before HTHS was organized under a school district, its roots stretch back to 1869 to the first schoolhouse in Trussville, named the Trussville Academy. Founded by academic Robert Greene Hewitt, this schoolhouse served as a church and school building until the property was sold to the city while the school moved to a property across from the future Chalkville Road school. By the 1920s there was sufficient demand for a high school in the local rural communities that Jefferson County Schools created a new school zone for the communities of Trussville, Clay, Chalkville, Ayres (now part of Clay), Pinson, Center Point, Palmerdale (now part of Pinson), and Roper (now part of Trussville).

Named in honor of the founder of the first schoolhouse in Trussville, a new school was established and named R.G. Hewitt High School. The new school was established in 1925 on Chalkville Road and graduated its first students in 1927. By 1938 the student population had outgrown the facility, leading Jefferson County Schools to request that a community center under construction in the Cahaba Homestead Village be used as a high school instead. This building, located at 301 Parkway Drive, would serve as Trussville's high school until a new high school campus was constructed on Trussville-Clay Road. This was also the year the name of the high school changed to Hewitt-Trussville High School, which has remained the same to this day.

During the 1940s-1960s HTHS remained a rural county school with most students coming in from surrounding communities. From the 1960s-1970s the HTHS school zone was gradually reduced with the introduction of high schools and new school zones in Center Point and Pinson/Palmerdale, due to population growth in those communities which began overcrowding the Trussville schools. By the early 1980s HTHS was still dealing with overcrowding, classes then moved to the new Trussville-Clay Road campus in January 1984, at which point the 1938 facility was renovated to house Hewitt-Trussville Middle School.

The new HTHS campus was designed by Adams/Peacher/Keeton/Cosby, Inc. with Moore Engineering & Construction serving as the general contractor. In 1996 the large, illuminated signage visible from I-59 was added to the southern facade. The front wing contained the gymnasium, auditorium, cafeteria, band room and administrative offices. The rear wing contained academic classrooms with the five hallways being distinguished by color (the red, orange, green, yellow & gray). The interior featured a pair of outdoor courtyards.

During the late 1980s and early 1990s, HTHS struggled to accommodate a rapidly growing student population from the Trussville, Clay, and Chalkville areas. By 1995, HTHS enrolled over 1,500 students in only three grades and was the sixth largest high school in the state of Alabama. The Jefferson County Board of Education agreed to build a new high school that would serve students from Clay and Chalkville, reducing the HTHS student population by about 40%. Although overcrowding was temporary resolved with the construction of Clay-Chalkville High School in 1996, the continued rapid growth within Trussville resulted in the need for a new building, which opened in October 2008. The existing school was then converted into Hewitt-Trussville Middle School, which now occupies the building.

The current HTHS building is located on a 127-acre site on Husky Parkway between Trussville-Clay Road and Deerfoot Parkway, across I-59 from the previous campus. The school is able to accommodate about 1,600 students with room to grow to 2,400 students in the future. The school also includes a fine arts center, auditorium, field house and multiple athletic fields.

The final design for the school was approved by the Trussville Board of Education in September 2006. On Tuesday, November 14, 2006, the Trussville City Council rezoned the parcels at 5601 and 5555 Trussville-Clay Road from agricultural to institutional use to allow for the construction of the new building. The school was designed by Davis Architects and encompasses 360,000-square feet. Its design includes white columns and a clock tower, and at a final cost of $70 million, the school was the most expensive high school ever built in Alabama upon its opening in October 2008. However, more funding was required after a failed attempt to build an indoor swimming pool on the 2nd floor B-Wing.

== Athletics ==
=== List of competitive athletic teams ===
HTHS competes in AHSAA Class 6A athletics and fields teams in the following sports:

Girls' Sports	Boys' Sports
Basketball	Baseball
Bowling	Basketball
Cheerleading	Bowling
Cross Country	Cross Country
Flag Football	Fishing
Golf	Football
Indoor Track & Field	Golf
Lacrosse	Indoor Track & Field
Mountain Biking	Lacrosse
Outdoor Track & Field	Mountain Biking
Soccer	Outdoor Track & Field
Softball	Soccer
Tennis	Tennis
Volleyball	Wrestling

=== Facilities ===
Jack Wood Stadium, adjacent to the building at 301 Parkway Drive, was used until 2013 for football games and track and field events, as well as annual commencement exercises. In 2014 a new stadium was opened on Husky Parkway, and Jack Wood stadium was demolished as part of the construction of Cahaba Elementary School. Current facilities include the Bryant Bank Arena (HTHS gymnasium), Phil English Field (baseball stadium), Goldie Paine Field (softball stadium), Hewitt-Trussville soccer stadium, and Hewitt-Trussville Stadium which houses Husky Field as well as the Dobbs’ Cross Country and Track & Field Complex.

=== Championships ===
HTHS has won nineteen AHSAA state championships:

- Baseball (2016, 2026)
- Boys’ Indoor Track (2021)
- Girls’ Bowling (1975, 1977)
- Girls’ Flag Football (2021)
- Girls' Golf (2005)
- Girls' Indoor Track (1999, 2021)
- Girls' Outdoor Track & Field (1999)
- Gymnastics (discontinued) (1989, 1990, 1991)
- Softball (2019, 2021, 2023)
- Wrestling (1983, 1987, 1988)

HTHS football has won six regional championships (1983, 1992, 1993, 1995, 2008, 2016, and 2017). It has competed in the state football playoffs thirty-two times, reaching the semifinals three times and finals once. HTHS had its first undefeated season in 2016, and repeated it in 2017. Noted for being a football power under coaches Jack Wood, Hal Riddle, and more recently Josh Floyd, it has fought off former rivals such as Leeds High School, Center Point High School (formerly E. B. Erwin High), and its most famous former rival, Clay-Chalkville High School. HTHS continues to play longtime rivals Pinson Valley High School and Huffman High School while battling newer rivals Hoover High School and Thompson High School.

Introduced in 2021, HTHS Girls' Flag Football had an undefeated inaugural season under coaches Taylor Burt and Tonya Hunter, winning the first ever Girls’ Flag Football state championship.

== Student activities ==
HTHS sponsors a variety of student activities, including many nationally affiliated clubs and organizations. The following is a list of many of these:

- Alliance Club (promotes tolerance, individuality, and creativity)
- Beta Club (promotes academic achievement, character, service, and leadership)
- Biomedical Sciences Club
- Book Club
- Creative Writing Club
- Culinary Club
- Debate Team
- Distributive Education Clubs of America
- Engineering Club
- Fellowship of Christian Athletes
- Future Business Leaders of America
- Future Homemakers of America
- Future Teachers of America
- HTHS Ambassadors
- Hewitt-Trussville Marching Husky Band
- International Thespian Society
- Junior Civitans
- Latin Club
- Math Team
- Memento yearbook staff
- Mu Alpha Theta (mathematics honor society)
- National Art Honor Society
- National Honor Society
- National Vocational-Technical Honor Society
- Peer Helpers
- Recycling Club
- Science Olympiad
- Scholar's Bowl
- Service Association (S.A.s)
- Skills USA
- Spanish Club
- Spanish Honor Society
- Student Council
- Technical Students of America

== Notable alumni ==
- Jay Barker, former quarterback for University of Alabama and NFL player with Green Bay Packers, New England Patriots, and Carolina Panthers
- Brandon Cox, former quarterback for Auburn University
- Clayne Crawford, actor
- Steele Hall, baseball player in the Cincinnati Reds organization
- Whaley Hall, NFL player
- Noah Igbinoghene, NFL player
- Omari Kelly, NFL player
- Brent Key, head football coach, Georgia Tech
- Irene Latham, author of poetry and fiction for young adults
- Malachi Moore, football player
- Mike Mordecai, former baseball player with Atlanta Braves, Montreal Expos, and Florida Marlins
- Dave Reavis, football player with Tampa Bay Buccaneers
- Jason Standridge, baseball player with Tampa Bay Rays and Fukuoka SoftBank Hawks (Japan)
- Justin Tubbs, former point guard for University of Alabama and East Tennessee State University basketball team
- Tyler Tolbert, baseball player with Kansas City Royals
