= Susan Miller Dorsey High School =

Public high school in California, United States

Susan Miller Dorsey Senior High School
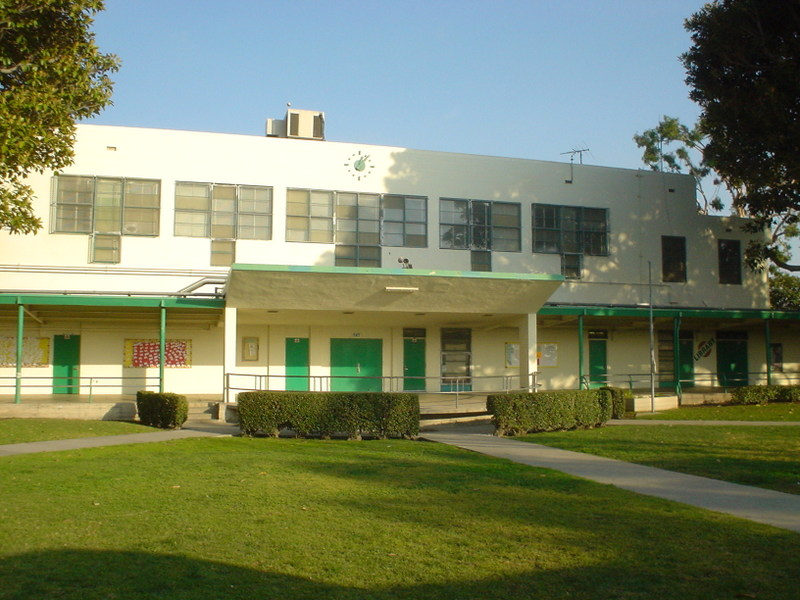

Location
- 3537 Farmdale Avenue; Los Angeles, California 90016; United States; 34.0228°N 118.3462°W

Information
- Type: Public High School
- Established: 1937; 89 years ago
- Locale: City, Large
- School district: Los Angeles Unified School District
- NCES District ID: 0622710
- NCES School ID: 062271002965
- Principal: Reginald A. Sample
- Teaching staff: 46.84 (on an FTE basis)
- Grades: 9–12
- Enrollment: 853 (2024–25)
  - Male: 451
  - Female: 402
- Student to teacher ratio: 18.21
- Colors: Green and White
- Athletics conference: Coliseum League; CIF Los Angeles City Section
- Mascot: Dons/Donnas
- Newspaper: Dorsey Gram
- Website: dorseyhs.lausd.org

Susan Miller Dorsey High School, commonly referred to as Dorsey High School, is a secondary public high school located in the Baldwin Hills neighborhood of Los Angeles, California. It is part of the Los Angeles Unified School District.

== History ==
The school opened in 1937 and enrolls an average of 2,400 students. It is located at 3537 Farmdale Avenue and Obama Boulevard in Baldwin Village, near the Farmdale station of the Metro E Line. The school colors are green and white; its mascots are the Dons (male) and Donnas (female). It was in the Los Angeles City High School District until 1961, when it merged into the Los Angeles Unified School District (LAUSD).

The school was designed by architect Henry L. Gogerty. The school served as the filming location for the high school scenes in Steven Spielberg's 2022 semi-autobiographical film The Fabelmans.

== Demographics ==
Dorsey High is one of the few predominantly African-American high schools in the LAUSD, with 55% of its students African American and 45% Latino.

=== Namesake ===
The school was named after Susan Miller Dorsey, the first female superintendent of the Los Angeles public school system. She was born in 1857 in Penn Yan, New York. She graduated from Vassar College in Poughkeepsie, New York in 1877. For a year she taught at Wilson College in Chambersburg, Pennsylvania, returning to Vassar to teach Greek and Latin. In 1881, she married Baptist minister Patrick William Dorsey. Also in 1881, they moved to Los Angeles, where Patrick Dorsey became pastor of First Baptist Church at 6th Street and Broadway (then known as Fort Street).

In the early 1890s, her husband abandoned her, taking their son with him. Susan Dorsey taught at Los Angeles High School in 1896 eventually becoming the vice principal. By 1913, she was the assistant superintendent of schools and in 1920, she became superintendent, remaining in the position for nine years.

== Athletics ==
The school has several athletic teams including football, basketball, baseball, track & field, wrestling, swimming, golf, soccer, and tennis.

=== Football ===
Dorsey High School's football teams were Los Angeles City Football Champions in 1976, 1982, 1989, 1991, 1995, and 2001. Susan Miller Dorsey has the distinct reputation of sending the fifth most football players to the National Football League (NFL) in the history of the NFL behind Long Beach Poly in Long Beach, California.

=== Basketball ===
In 1975, Dorsey's basketball team went undefeated until they lost in the Los Angeles city semi final game to Fremont (whom they had beaten in two regular season games). They rebounded in 1976 to win the city championship over Crenshaw High School in Los Angeles. In 1993, 1994 and 2012 they went to the city finals when they lost to Crenshaw and Taft High School respectively. Women's basketball has won the city championship in 1996.

== Notable alumni ==
- Franklyn Ajaye (Class of 1967), stand-up comedian-actor
- Billy Anderson, National Football League player
- George "Sparky" Anderson (Class of Winter 1953), Major League Baseball Hall of Fame member, manager of the world champion Detroit Tigers and world champion Cincinnati Reds, second baseman with the Philadelphia Phillies and broadcaster for the Anaheim Angels
- Sherman Augustus, actor, martial artist, and former NFL player
- David Axelrod, composer, arranger, and producer
- Ron Baxter (Class of 1976), professional basketball player drafted by the Los Angeles Lakers and played for the Continental Basketball Association
- Jerome Boyd (Class of 2004), NFL player
- William Boyett, born in 1927, actor best known for appearing in TV law enforcement series including as Adam-12, Dragnet and Highway Patrol
- James "Jimmy" Bridges, actor, director, and producer
- Leon Bridges, architect
- Judge Joe Brown, judge and TV personality
- Keith Browner Jr. (Class of 2006), NFL defensive end
- Andrea Buchanan, professional tennis player
- Beno Bryant, professional football player
- Don Buford (Class of 1955), professional baseball player with the Chicago White Sox and Baltimore Orioles and on the coaching staff in the MLB
- Charles Bukowski, author
- Frank Buncom, player with the San Diego Chargers in the American Football League
- John Casado, graphic designer
- Roslyn Chasan, lawyer
- Antonio Chatman (Class of 1997), NFL wide receiver
- Breanna Clark (Class of 2012), Paralympic athlete
- Billy Consolo, professional MLB player and on the Detroit Tigers coaching staff
- Ron Copeland, hurdler, sprinter, and NFL wide receiver for the Chicago Bears
- Aaron Cox (Class of 1983), NFL wide receiver for the Los Angeles Rams and Indianapolis Colts
- Jamal Crawford, Former NBA player and NBC Sports analyst
- Chili Davis (Class of 1977), professional MLB player
- Willie Deckard, track and field star
- Na'il Diggs (Class of 1996), NFL player
- Julian Dixon, member of United States Congress
- Eric Dolphy (Class of 1947), jazz musician who influenced John Coltrane and many other musicians
- Carl E. Douglas, lawyer in the O. J. Simpson case
- Johnny Echols, guitarist and co-founder with Dorsey schoolmate Arthur Lee, of the band Love
- Vic Edelbrock Jr., president of Edelbrock, LLC, manufacturer of specialty automotive and motorcycle parts
- Richard Elfman, actor, musician, director, producer, screenwriter, journalist, author, and magazine publisher
- Johnathan Franklin (Class of 2008), NFL running back with the Green Bay Packers
- Keith Franklin, NFL player for the Los Angeles Rams
- Sara Finney-Johnson, Television producer f, co-creator of UPN's Moesha and The Parkers and writer for The Game.
- Charles García (Class of 2006), professional basketball player
- Siedah Garrett (attended Dorsey), vocalist and songwriter
- Herb Geller, jazz saxophonist, composer, and arranger
- David Gettis (Class of 2005), NFL wide receiver
- Kyle Gibson, professional basketball player
- Chris Green, MLB pitcher for the Pittsburgh Pirates
- Marvin Hall (Class of 2011), NFL wide receiver for the Detroit Lions and Atlanta Falcons
- Jordan Hamilton, National Basketball Association player and international basketball player
- Michael S. Harper, poet and English professor
- Jeremy Harris, NFL and Canadian Football League player
- Robert Herron (Class of 2010), NFL wide receiver
- Earl Ofari Hutchinson, journalist, author, and activist
- Robert Irwin, installation artist
- Abdul-Karim al-Jabbar, NFL running back
- Bernard Jackson, NFL player
- Hue Jackson (Class of 1983), NFL head coach of the Cleveland Browns in 2016 and the Oakland Raiders in 2011, offensive coordinator of Cincinnati Bengals
- Greg Jein, modelmaker nominated for the Academy Award for Best Visual Effects and Primetime Emmy Award for Outstanding Special Visual Effects
- Jeremiah Johnson (Class of 2005), NFL and CFL running back
- Jerome Johnson (Class of 2003), NFL player; city champs 2001-2002
- Keyshawn Johnson (Class of 1991), USC wide receiver, Rose Bowl Hall of Fame, NFL wide receiver and NFL Super Bowl Champion, sportscaster
- Michael "Butch" McColly Johnson, NFL wide receiver
- Omari Johnson (Class of 2006), professional NBA player with the Memphis Grizzlies and international basketball player
- Stafon Johnson (Class of 2006), NFL running back
- Kendall Jones, lead guitarist, founding member of rock band Fishbone
- Robert Kardashian, O.J. Simpson attorney, father of Robert, Khloe, Kourtney, and Kim Kardashian
- Jack Kirby (Class of 1942), NFL halfback / defensive back
- David Kirkwood, Olympic silver medalist (1964), modern pentathlon
- Hamilton Gary Kotera, professional basketball player
- Jackie Lacey (Class of 1975), District Attorney of Los Angeles County
- Bill Lachemann, professional baseball player, coach
- Marcel Lachemann, professional baseball player (Oakland Athletics) and former MLB manager (California Angels)
- Rene Lachemann, professional baseball player (Kansas City Athletics, Oakland Athletics), former MLB manager (Seattle Mariners, Milwaukee Brewers, Florida Marlins)
- Eric Laneuville, television director, producer and actor.
- Arthur Lee, lead singer, co-founder and principal songwriter of the band Love
- Ron Lewis, NFL offensive lineman
- Mike Love (Class of 1959), lead singer and founding member of The Beach Boys
- Chris Matthews, 2012 CFL's Most Outstanding Rookie, and Seattle Seahawks wide receiver in the NFL
- Art Mazmanian, baseball head coach and manager
- Marilyn McCoo (Class of 1960), singer and founding member of The Fifth Dimension
- Clarence McDonald, pianist, composer, arranger, and producer
- Jaydon Mickens (Class of 2012), NFL wide receiver
- Chris Mims (Class of 1989), NFL player for the San Diego Chargers
- Charles Mincy, NFL safety and former head coach of Dorsey Dons football
- Rahim Moore (Class of 2007), NFL safety
- Jacqueline Morreau, artist
- DJ Mustard (Class of 2008), record producer, songwriter, and DJ
- Patrick Nagatani, photographer
- Senga Nengudi, visual artist and curator
- Jack Nix, NFL and CFL end
- Dennis Northcutt (Class of 1996), NFL wide receiver
- Paul Olden, New York Yankees public address announcer
- Chris Owens (Class of 2004), NFL cornerback
- Judy Pace (Class of 1960), 1970s actress and model
- Ed Palmquist, professional baseball player (Los Angeles Dodgers, Minnesota Twins)
- Mike Patterson, professional baseball player (Oakland Athletics, New York Yankees)
- Troy Payne, professional basketball player
- Carole Doyle Peel, artist
- Jerry Peters, songwriter, record producer, multi-instrumentalist, conductor and arranger
- Makai Polk, NFL wide receiver
- Billy Preston, musician, singer, songwriter ("You Are So Beautiful" and "Will It Go Round in Circles")
- Frederick K. C. Price, televangelist, founder and pastor of Crenshaw Christian Center
- Googie René, musician, bandleader, and songwriter.
- "Freeway" Rick Ross, drug trafficker in the 1980s, played for the Dorsey men's tennis team
- Stella Rush, LGBT rights activist and journalist
- Michael Brian Schiffer, co-founder of behavioral archaeology, long-time anthropology professor at the University of Arizona, author of 15 books
- Sharrieff Shah, football coach
- Edell Shepherd (Class of 1998), NFL wide receiver, Tampa Bay Buccaneers
- Louil Silas Jr. (1956–2001), record executive who started an MCA Records imprint, Silas Records
- Jordan Simmons, NFL offensive tackle, Seattle Seahawks
- John Smith (Class of 1948), actor, Laramie
- Brenda Sykes (Class of 1967), actress
- Dick Teague, industrial designer in automotive industry, executive at American Motors Corporation (AMC).
- Kayvon Thibodeaux, American football player
- Derrel Thomas, professional baseball player (Houston Astros, San Diego Padres, San Francisco Giants, Los Angeles Dodgers, Montreal Expos, California Angels, Philadelphia Phillies)
- Lamont Warren, (Class of 1990), NFL running back
- Jody Watley (Class of 1977), singer, with Shalamar, solo artist
- Diane Watson, member of United States Congress
- James Wilkes (Class of 1976), UCLA and Chicago Bulls basketball player
- Kirby Wilson, NFL running backs coach, 2-time Super Bowl champion with Tampa Bay Buccaneers (2002) and Pittsburgh Steelers (2009)
- Nick Young, NBA player for the Los Angeles Lakers

== See also ==
- CIF Southern Section
