= Trussville City Schools =

School district in Alabama, U.S.

Location
- Trussville, Jefferson County, Alabama United States

District information
- Type: Public
- Motto: “Learning Today, Leaders Tomorrow”
- Grades: K-12
- Established: 2005
- Superintendent: Patrick Martin
- Schools: 5
- Budget: $59.0 million
- NCES District ID: 0100013

Students and staff
- Students: 5,000
- Teachers: 350
- Staff: 220
- Athletic conference: 7A Region 3

Other information
- Website: www.tcsk12.us

Trussville City Schools (TCS) is the public school system for Trussville, Alabama, a city east of Birmingham. The Trussville City Schools school district serves approximately 5,000 students and is consistently ranked among the top 10 districts in the state of Alabama. Its standardized test scores in Math, Science, and English Language Arts regularly land among the Top 5 or Top 10 in the state (among 138 school systems). The district also consistently earns high rankings from third-party entities including Niche and School Digger. The mascot is the Husky, and team colors are red, gray, and white.

== Board Members ==
School board officials are appointed by the Trussville City Council for a set term that can be extended or have their contract altered by a vote of the Board of Education.

Members, as of January 2024:

Superintendent - Patrick M. Martin, Ph.D.

Board President - Mrs. Kim DeShazo

Board Vice President - Mrs. Kathy Brown

Board Member - Mr. Jason Daniel

Board Member - Mrs. Sherrye Tolbert

Board Member - Dr. Steve Ward

== History ==
Trussville schools were part of the Jefferson County School System until 2005. In 2000, a financial crisis forced the county to reduce funding for teachers, and when the city of Trussville was not allowed to offset these reductions with its own funds, it began to explore the possibility of creating a separate system. In 2004, the city council passed a resolution that created the Trussville Board of Education, and in 2005, Trussville City Schools officially separated from the Jefferson County School System.

Suzanne Freeman was the district's first superintendent, serving from the district's inception until 2012. She was succeeded by Dr. Patricia Neill, who resigned in 2022.

On October 31, 2022, Dr. Neill sent her letter of resignation to the school board, ending her tenure as superintendent. Frank Costanzo was named interim superintendent on November 1. Dr. Neill's contract was originally extended in February 2022 to June 30, 2026, but was reworked by the school board to end on October 31, 2023. It was later discovered Neill (under the name Patricia Ragsdale) was also removed from her superintendent position with Cumberland County Schools in Tennessee, for reasons still unknown in 2007.

In the aftermath of the September 30 meeting, all board members received their own personal emails (the school board prior to this day only had one group email), and one board member visited every school in the system to check in with administrators.

On March 23, 2023, after an extensive three-month process of interviewing and searching, the Trussville City School Board appointed Dr. Patrick Martin as superintendent, he was formerly the assistant superintendent at Vestavia Hills City Schools.

== Student profile ==
Trussville City Schools serve all students living within Trussville city limits. The student population is 86% white, 10% African-American, 2% Asian-American, 1% Hispanic, and 1% multiracial. Approximately 10% of students qualify for free or reduced price lunch. Less than 1% are English Language Learners (ELL), and about 8% have Individualized Education Programs (IEPs).

Trussville City Schools have a dropout rate that is less than one half of one percent. Approximately 93% of Trussville students meet or exceed state proficiency standards in mathematics, and about 95% meet or exceed standards in reading.

== Schools ==
The Trussville City School District includes five schools: a 7A high school, a large middle school, and three elementary schools.

=== Hewitt-Trussville High School ===
Hewitt-Trussville High School (HTHS) is the only high school in the district and serves all students in grades 9 to 12. It surpassed 1,600 students during the 2021-2022 School Year, and with 97 faculty members, had a student-teacher ratio of approximately 15:1. HTHS athletic teams compete in AHSAA Class 7A Region 3 Athletics as designated by the Alabama High School Athletic Association (AHSAA).

Completed in 2008, the HTHS campus is located on a 127-acre site on Husky Parkway between Trussville Clay Road and Deerfoot Parkway, across I-59 from Hewitt-Trussville Middle School. The school is able to accommodate about 1,600 students, with room to grow to 2,400 students in the future. The school was designed by Davis Architects and encompasses 285,000-square feet. Its design includes white columns and a clock tower, and at a final cost of $70 million, the school was the most expensive high school ever built in Alabama upon its opening in October 2008.

=== Hewitt-Trussville Middle School ===
Hewitt-Trussville Middle School (HTMS) serves all students in grades 6 to 8. Its student enrollment for the 2021-2022 School Year was approximately 1,300 students with nearly 75 faculty and staff members. All three Trussville elementary schools serve as feeder schools for Hewitt-Trussville Middle School.

HTMS was established in 1984 on the former campus of Hewitt-Trussville High School in the Cahaba Homestead Project. In 2008, it moved to its current campus on Trussville Clay Road, across Interstate 59 from the new Hewitt-Trussville High School.

=== Cahaba Elementary School ===
Cahaba Elementary School welcomed its first students for the 2016–2017 school year. It is located on the Mall in the Cahaba Project and occupies the renovated campus of the former Hewitt-Trussville Middle and High Schools. The historic campus was renovated at a cost of approximately $9 million and has the capacity to house up to 500 students.

=== Magnolia Elementary School ===
Magnolia Elementary School was scheduled to open for the 2016–2017 school year, but construction delays pushed its opening back by a month and a half. Magnolia serves most of the students in the southern part of the city. A new construction with a budget of $14 million, Magnolia is large enough to house up to 400 students. As of the 2021-2022 School Year, Magnolia Elementary was growing and served a student population of approximately 375.

=== Paine Elementary School ===
Paine Elementary School is situated on U.S. Highway 11 on a tract of land donated by Amerex Corporation founders Ned and Goldie Paine. It is the largest elementary school in Trussville, with more than 1,300 students. The sprawling campus features a north and south side, each having its own gymnasium and own cafeteria. Paine previously comprised two distinct schools on the same campus: Paine Primary School, which enrolled grades K-2, and Paine Intermediate School, which enrolled grades 3 to 5. Starting with the 2016–2017 academic year, the two schools were consolidated as one.
