= Jerome Johnson (American football) =

American football player (born 1985)

No. 84
- Position: Fullback/Linebacker

Personal information
- Born: January 19, 1985 (age 41); Los Angeles, California
- Listed height: 6 ft 1 in (1.85 m)
- Listed weight: 265 lb (120 kg)

Career information
- High school: Susan Miller Dorsey (Los Angeles)
- College: Oregon
- NFL draft: 2009: undrafted

Career history
- St. Louis Rams (2009)*; New York Giants (2010)*; Arizona Cardinals (2010)
- * Offseason or practice squad member only
- Stats at Pro Football Reference

Jerome Johnson (born January 19, 1985) is an American former professional football player who was a fullback in the National Football League (NFL). He played college football for the Oregon Ducks and was signed by the St. Louis Rams as an undrafted free agent in 2009.

Johnson was also a member of the New York Giants and Arizona Cardinals.

== Early life ==
Johnson played football and graduated from Susan Miller Dorsey High School in Los Angeles, California, and was a two-time All-City selection, 2001 City Champion.

== College career ==
Johnson played for one year at West Los Angeles Community College. In 2006, he played in 12 games with no starts on defense as a linebacker and on special teams, recording one tackle at the University of Nevada. In 2007, he played in all 13 games with eight starts at inside linebacker and was fifth on the team with 58 tackles, 6 pass breakups 6.5 tackles for loss and recovered two fumbles and forced one. He received the BLACK OUT award for hardest hitter. In 2008 Johnson played 13 games at linebacker and made 86 tackles (10 for losses) 8 PBU's and one interception for 28 yards, which he returned for a touchdown. He received the BLACK OUT award and Fireman Award for playing all 3 linebacker positions in a season.

== Professional career ==
=== St. Louis Rams ===
Johnson was signed by the St. Louis Rams as an undrafted free agent on April 30, 2009. During the 2009 preseason he had three receptions for 22 yards and one rush for two yards in four games played. He was released on September 5, 2009.

=== New York Giants ===
Johnson was signed by the New York Giants on January 6, 2010. He was waived by the Giants on September 4, 2010.

=== Arizona Cardinals ===
On September 5, 2010, Johnson was claimed off waivers by the Arizona Cardinals. He was released on September 14, 2010.

== Personal ==
Johnson's brother Jeremiah played at Oregon and signed as an undrafted rookie free agent with the Houston Texans in 2009.
