= 2011 NBA Development League draft =

General information
- Sport: Basketball
- Date: November 3, 2011
- Location: via Cisco WebEx

Overview
- League: NBA
- First selection: Jamaal Tinsley, Los Angeles D-Fenders

The 2011 NBA Development League draft was the 11th of the National Basketball Association Development League (NBDL). The draft was held on November 3, 2011, before the 2011–12 season. In this draft, all 16 of the league's teams took turns selecting eligible players. Jamaal Tinsley was the first overall draft pick by the Los Angeles D-Fenders.

== Key ==
Pos.	G	F	C
Position	Guard	Forward	Center

^	Denotes player who has been selected to (an) NBA Development League All-Star Game(s)
*	Denotes player who has been selected to (an) NBA Development League All-Star Game(s) and was also selected in an NBA draft
†	Denotes player who was also selected in an NBA draft

== Draft ==
Round	Pick	Player	Position	Nationality	Team	College
1	1	Jamaal Tinsley^{†}	G	United States	Los Angeles D-Fenders	Iowa State
1	2	Alando Tucker^{†}	F/G	United States	Texas Legends	Wisconsin
1	3	Chris Wright^	F	United States	Maine Red Claws	Dayton
1	4	Gabe Pruitt^{†}	G	United States	Sioux Falls Skyforce	USC
1	5	Jamal Sampson^{†}	C/F	United States	Texas Legends	California
1	6	Edwin Ubiles^	G/F	United States; Puerto Rico	Bakersfield Jam	Siena
1	7	Cory Higgins	G	United States	Erie Bayhawks	Colorado
1	8	Mac Koshwal	F	United States; Sudan	Bakersfield Jam	DePaul
1	9	Chris Daniels	C	United States	Erie Bayhawks	Texas A&M–CC
1	10	Cameron Jones	G	United States	Fort Wayne Mad Ants	Northern Arizona
1	11	Curtis Sumpter	F	United States	Tulsa 66ers	Villanova
1	12	Osiris Eldridge	G	United States	Dakota Wizards	Illinois State
1	13	Mustapha Farrakhan, Jr.	G	United States	Bakersfield Jam	Virginia
1	14	Tyren Johnson^	F	United States	Rio Grande Valley Vipers	Louisiana–Lafayette
1	15	Tyrell Biggs^	F	United States	Canton Charge	Pittsburgh
1	16	Gary Johnson	F	United States	Tulsa 66ers	Texas
2	17	Jonathan Thomas	G	United States	Springfield Armor	Marshall
2	18	Jake Kelly	G	United States	Texas Legends	Indiana State
2	19	Ashton Mitchell	G	United States	Rio Grande Valley Vipers	Sam Houston State
2	20	Cedric Bozeman	G	United States	Reno Bighorns	UCLA
2	21	Dwight Buycks	G	United States	Tulsa 66ers	Marquette
2	22	Anthony Johnson	G	United States	Fort Wayne Mad Ants	Montana
2	23	Jason Ellis	F	United States	Idaho Stampede	Boise State
2	24	Durrell Summers^	G	United States	Maine Red Claws	Michigan State
2	25	Kevin Galloway	F	United States	Idaho Stampede	Texas Southern
2	26	Brandon Ewing	G	United States	Iowa Energy	Wyoming
2	27	Dominic Calegari	F	United States	Iowa Energy	UC Davis
2	28	Taj McCullough	F	United States	Erie BayHawks	Winthrop
2	29	Mike Tisdale	C	United States	Maine Red Claws	Illinois
2	30	Tristan Thompson	G	United States	Austin Toros	North Texas
2	31	Anthony Gurley	G	United States	Los Angeles D-Fenders	Massachusetts
3	32	Eniel Polynice	G	United States; Haiti	Los Angeles D-Fenders	Seton Hall
3	33	Brady Morningstar	G	United States	Tulsa 66ers	Kansas
3	34	Charles Okwandu	C	Nigeria	Maine Red Claws	Connecticut
3	35	Casey Mitchell	G	United States	Sioux Falls Skyforce	West Virginia
3	36	Lawrence Hill^	F	United States	Texas Legends	Stanford
3	37	Jarrid Famous	C	United States	Iowa Energy	South Florida
3	38	Mychel Thompson	F	United States	Erie Bayhawks	Pepperdine
3	39	Justin Graham	G	United States	Bakersfield Jam	San Jose State
3	40	Kendall Dartez	C	United States	Idaho Stampede	Louisville
3	41	Travis Walton	G	United States	Bakersfield Jam	Michigan State
3	42	Evan Field	F	United States	Tulsa 66ers	Vermont
3	43	Andrew Gonzalez	F	United States	Dakota Wizards	Houston Baptist
3	44	Cheyne Gadson	G	United States	Idaho Stampede	Oklahoma State
3	45	Greg Washington	G	United States; United States Virgin Islands	Rio Grande Valley Vipers	Hofstra
3	46	Justin Johnson	G	United States	Dakota Wizards	Concordia (CA)
3	47	Dennis Horner	F	United States	Springfield Armor	NC State
4	48	Chris Taft^{†}	F	United States	Springfield Armor	Pittsburgh
4	49	T. J. Campbell	G	United States	Canton Charge	Portland
4	50	Pooh Williams	G/F	United States	Rio Grande Valley Vipers	Utah State
4	51	Donald Sims	G	United States	Reno Bighorns	Appalachian State
4	52	Jake Anderson	G	United States	Dakota Wizards	Iowa State
4	53	Rico Cunningham	F	United States	Tulsa 66ers	Lee
4	54	Nick Murphy	G	United States	Iowa Energy	Jacksonville State
4	55	Eric Devendorf	G	United States	Idaho Stampede	Syracuse
4	56	David Palmer	C	United States	Bakersfield Jam	Northern Kentucky
4	57	Tirrell Baines	F	United States	Erie Bayhawks	Marshall
4	58	Michael Tveidt	F	United States	Iowa Energy	North Dakota State
4	59	Vance Cooksey	G	United States	Texas Legends	Pikeville
4	60	Billy McShepard	F	United States	Sioux Falls Skyforce	Valdosta State
4	61	Sadiel Rojas	G	United States	Maine Red Claws	Oklahoma Wesleyan
4	62	Omar Reed	F	United States	Austin Toros	Bluefield College
4	63	Brandon Rozzell	G	United States	Los Angeles D-Fenders	VCU
5	64	Courtney Fortson^	G	United States	Los Angeles D-Fenders	Arkansas
5	65	Solomon Bozeman	G	United States	Austin Toros	Arkansas–Little Rock
5	66	Darren Cooper	G	United States	Maine Red Claws	Portland
5	67	Anthony Moody	G	United States	Sioux Falls Skyforce	Mary
5	68	Josh Southern	C	United States	Texas Legends	Boston College
5	69	Parrish West	F	United States	Dakota Wizards	Alaska-Fairbanks
5	70	Carlton Fay	F	United States	Iowa Energy	Southern Illinois
5	71	Al Nolen	G	United States	Erie Bayhawks	Minnesota
5	72	Lawrence Westbrook	G	United States	Bakersfield Jam	Minnesota
5	73	Courtney Pigram	G	United States	Idaho Stampede	East Tennessee State
5	74	Justin Neuhaus	C	United States	Fort Wayne Mad Ants	Colorado Christian
5	75	Byron Eaton	G	United States	Tulsa 66ers	Oklahoma State
5	76	Joe Harden	G	United States	Dakota Wizards	UC Davis
5	77	Augustine Okosun	F/C	Nigeria	Reno Bighorns	Northwood (FL)
5	78	Willie Veasley	G/F	United States	Rio Grande Valley Vipers	Butler
5	79	Tyrone Kent	G	United States	Canton Charge	Toledo
5	80	Brandon Rush	F	United States	Springfield Armor	Texas State
6	81	Jason Warren	G/F	United States	Fort Wayne Mad Ants	Missouri Western State
6	82	Marcus E. Hill	G	United States	Springfield Armor	Minnesota State Mankato
6	83	Travis Franklin	F	United States	Canton Charge	Colorado State
6	84	Joshua E. Jones	G	United States	Rio Grande Valley Vipers	Husson
6	85	Roderick Flemings	G	United States	Reno Bighorns	Hawaii
6	86	Brian Barkdoll	C	United States	Tulsa 66ers	Northern Nazarene
6	87	Jabril Banks	F	United States	Fort Wayne Mad Ants	Northern Colorado
6	88	James Wright	G	United States	Idaho Stampede	Colorado
6	89	Perry Stevenson	F	United States	Bakersfield Jam	Kentucky
6	90	Adrian Bowie	G	United States	Erie Bayhawks	Maryland
6	91	Thomas Baudinet	G	United States	Iowa Energy	Saint Anselm
6	92	Ryan Anderson	G	United States	Texas Legends	Nebraska
6	93	Will Pratt	F	United States	Sioux Falls Skyforce	Northwestern State
6	94	Anthony Vereen	F	United States	Texas Legends	Texas–Arlington
6	95	Myles McKay	G	United States	Austin Toros	Wisconsin-Whitewater
6	96	Franklin Session	G/F	United States	Los Angeles D-Fenders	Cal State Los Angeles
7	97	Rob Diggs	F	United States	Los Angeles D-Fenders	George Washington
7	98	Calvin Hayes	G	United States	Idaho Stampede	Oregon State
7	99	Dan Vandervieren	C	United States	Austin Toros	Concordia St. Paul
7	100	Brian Evans	G	United States	Sioux Falls Skyforce	Texas A&M–CC
7	101	Derek Williams	G	United States	Texas Legends	SMU
7	102	Jason Westrol	G	United States	Iowa Energy	Bentley
7	103	Bobby Howard	F	United States	Reno Bighorns	Montana State
7	104	Nick Covington	G	United States	Bakersfield Jam	Oklahoma City
7	105	Desmond Blue	C	United States	Idaho Stampede	Lee
7	106	Brian Wanamaker	G	United States	Fort Wayne Mad Ants	Texas Wesleyan
7	107	Maze Stallworth	F	United States	Tulsa 66ers	Morehead State
7	108	Jawan Bailey	F	United States	Dakota Wizards	Incarnate Word
7	109	Joseph Kennerly III	F	United States	Reno Bighorns	Central Oklahoma
7	110	Tron Smith	G	United States	Rio Grande Valley Vipers	Saint Mary's
7	111	Harry Marshall	G	United States	Canton Charge	Indiana State
7	112	Michael Sturns	G	United States	Springfield Armor	Holy Family
8	113	Akeem Bennett	G/F	United States	Springfield Armor	St. Francis
8	114	Jonathan Blake	F	United States	Canton Charge	Texas Wesleyan
8	115	Justin Tubbs	G	United States	Rio Grande Valley Vipers	East Tennessee State
8	116	Reuben Clayton	G	United States	Maine Red Claws	Tennessee–Martin
8	117	Bruce Price	G	United States	Dakota Wizards	Tennessee State
8	118	Xavier Alexander	G	United States	Tulsa 66ers	Southern Nazarene
8	119	Dauntae Williams	G	United States	Fort Wayne Mad Ants	Central Oklahoma
8	120	Dwain Williams	G	United States	Idaho Stampede	Hawaii
8	121	Juma Kamara	F	United States	Bakersfield Jam	Portland State
8	122	Jamael Lynch	G	United States	Erie Bayhawks	Rhode Island
8	123	James Lewis	G	United States	Austin Toros	Fresno Pacific
8	124	Collin Mangrum	G	United States	Texas Legends	SMU
8	125	Brock Gillespie	G	United States	Sioux Falls Skyforce	Rice
8	126	Jonathan Dupree	F	United States	Maine Red Claws	Pepperdine
8	127	Jerel Hastings	F	United States	Austin Toros	Albany
8	128	Troy Payne	F	United States	Los Angeles D-Fenders	Santa Clara
