= The Pinnacle (Trussville, Alabama) =

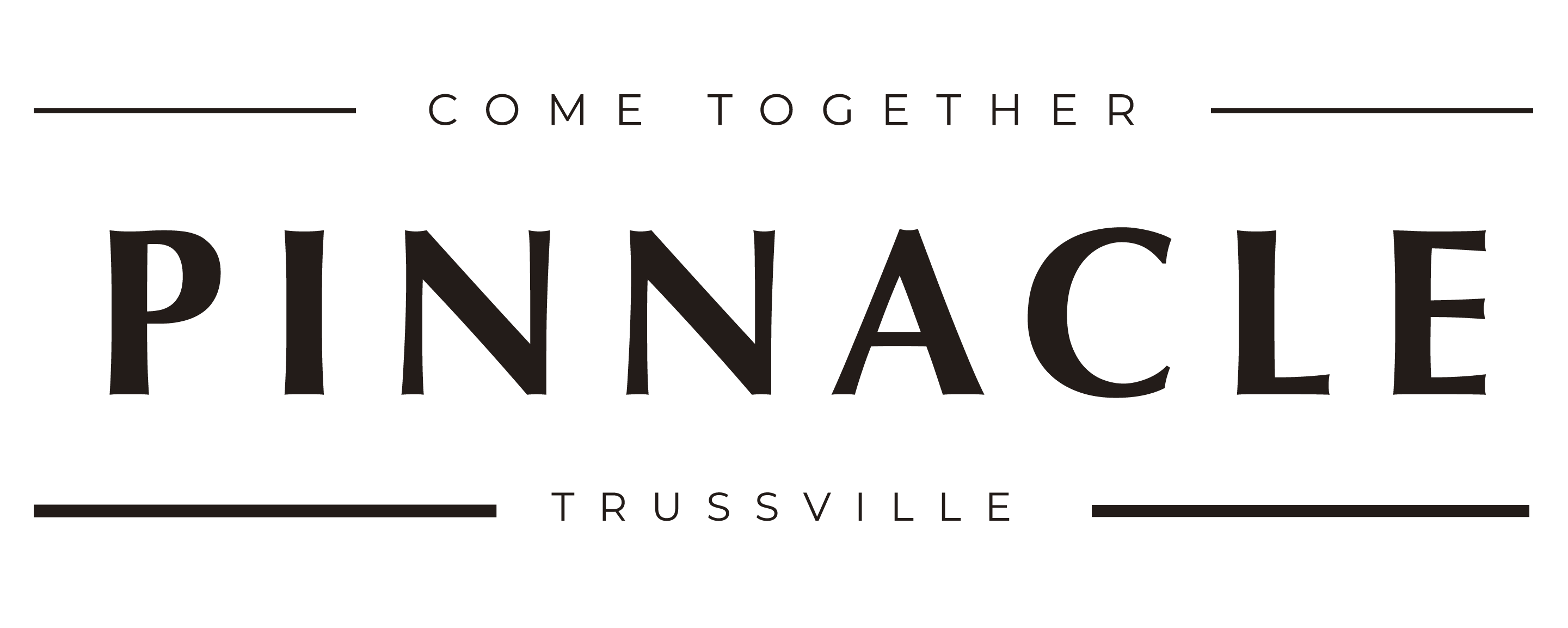
- Location: Trussville, Alabama, United States
- Coordinates: 33°36′29.08″N 86°38′19.89″W
- Opened: October 11, 2006
- Developer: Colonial Properties
- Floor area: 644,000 square feet (59,829.6 m^{2})

The Pinnacle, formerly known as Pinnacle at Tutwiler Farm, is a 75-acre (300,000 m^{2}), 644,000 square feet (60,000 m^{2}), $100 million lifestyle center located in Trussville, Alabama, which opened on October 11, 2006. The center was developed by Colonial Properties on land previously distinguished by a rocky hillside. Nearby is the Colonial Promenade at Tutwiler Farm, which was also developed by Colonial Properties.

Anchor tenants include At Home, Belk and JCPenney (who relocated their existing stores from Century Plaza). Other tenants include Best Buy, Ann Taylor LOFT, Chico's, Buckle, American Eagle Outfitters, JoS. A. Bank, The Children's Place, Justice, Portrait Innovations, Learning Express, New Balance, Kay Jewelers, and New York & Company. Local retailers include A Rabbit's Tale, Bama Fever/Tiger Pride, and Accessory Heaven. Outparcel restaurants include Logan's Roadhouse, Cajun Steamer, and Red Robin Gourmet Burgers.

A Circuit City once stood as an outparcel of the center, but it closed in 2008. The building was demolished and a new Olive Garden and Red Lobster were opened in mid-2011.

Belk operates one store which is located in the former Parisian. The original Belk became At Home which opened June 21, 2017.

A Courtyard by Marriott hotel is also in the complex.

The mall was sold to Pinnacle Retail in 2021.
