= Leon Bridges (architect) =

American architect (1932–2026)

- Born: August 18, 1932; Los Angeles, California, U.S.
- Died: April 13, 2026 (aged 93)
- Education: University of Washington, Loyola College of Maryland
- Occupation: Architect
- Practice: Bridges/Burke, The Leon Bridges Company, Sheladia/Bridges

Leon Bridges (August 18, 1932 – April 13, 2026) was an American architect and academic who was a professor at Morgan State University.

== Early life and education ==
Bridges was born in the East Los Angeles, California neighborhood of Boyle Heights, on August 18, 1932, to a mother who was a postal worker and a father who worked various jobs. He met his mentor, architect Paul Williams, while a student at Adams Junior High School. Bridges earned his high school diploma from Dorsey High School in 1950 where he was a member of the track team.

He went on to attend East Los Angeles Junior College, Los Angeles City College and the University of California, Los Angeles before being drafted into the military in 1952 (while studying at UCLA).

Bridges graduated with a bachelor's of architecture from the University of Washington in 1960 and from Loyola College of Maryland with an MBA in 1984.

== Career ==
Bridges founded the firm, Leon Bridges, AIA in Seattle in 1963, partnering with Edward Burke to become Bridges/Burke in 1966, before moving the firm in 1972 to Baltimore. He was principal at The Leon Bridges Company, and Sheladia/Bridges. Among his many firsts, in 1970 he became the first registered African American architect in Maryland.

He was the first elected black director of a regional AIA Board, was elected vice president of the National American Institute of Architects (AIA) and in 1976 and 1984 he was nominated as a Fellow of the College of Fellows, AIA. He also co-founded the AIA/Ford Minority Scholarship fund, which has provided college scholarships for many needy students. Bridges is also a former president and a member of the counsel of the National Organization of Minority Architects (NOMA). After semi-retiring in 2005, he became an assistant professor at Morgan State University School of Architecture and Planning.

Some of his projects have included the restoration of Baltimore Penn Station and Baltimore City College High School.

In 1998, Bridges received the AIA Whitney Young Award for his “unselfish service to the betterment of the profession, to the health of the community and to the encouragement for future architects.”

== Death ==
Bridges died on April 13, 2026, at the age of 93.
