= Jack Kirby (American football) =

American football player (1923–2007)

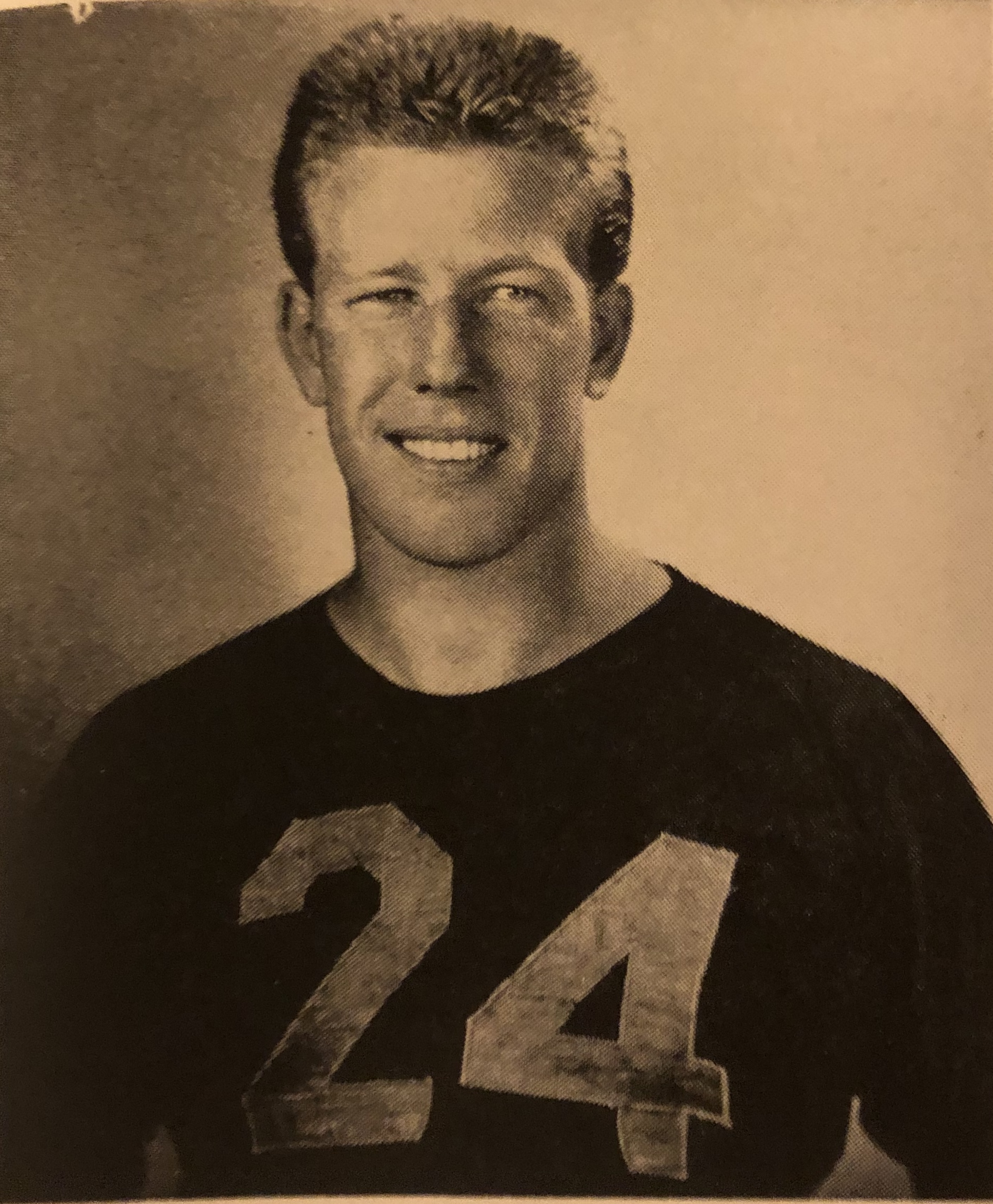
- Kirby at USC c. 1948

No. 43
- Position: Halfback/Defensive back

Personal information
- Born: September 21, 1922; Los Angeles, California, U.S.
- Died: March 9, 2007 (aged 84); Santa Barbara, California, U.S.
- Listed height: 5 ft 11 in (1.80 m)
- Listed weight: 185 lb (84 kg)

Career information
- High school: Susan Miller Dorsey (Los Angeles, California)
- College: USC

Career history
- Green Bay Packers (1949)

Career statistics
- Rushes: 3
- Rushing yards: 6
- Kick returns: 14
- Kick return yards: 315
- Punt returns: 8
- Punt return yards: 48
- Stats at Pro Football Reference

Jack Evans Kirby (September 21, 1923 – March 9, 2007) was a player in the National Football League.

== Biography ==
Kirby was born Jack Evans Kirby on September 21, 1923, in Los Angeles, California. He died on March 9, 2007, in Santa Barbara, California.

== Career ==
Kirby played with the Green Bay Packers during the 1949 NFL season. He played at the collegiate level at the University of Southern California. Jack was also All City in Los Angeles in 1942 when he played for the Dorsey High School Dons.
