= Troy Payne =

American basketball player (born 1988)

Personal information
- Born: May 8, 1988 (age 38) Los Angeles, California
- Listed height: 6 ft 6 in (1.98 m)
- Listed weight: 220 lb (100 kg)

Career information
- High school: Dorsey (Los Angeles, California)
- College: Citrus College (2007–2009); Santa Clara (2009–2011)
- NBA draft: 2011: undrafted
- Playing career: 2011–2014
- Position: Small forward

Career history
- 2013: NW Tasmania Thunder
- 2014: Otago Nuggets

Career highlights
- WCC Defensive Player of the Year (2011); WSC MVP (2009); First-team All-WSC (2009); First-team All-CCCAA (2009)

Troy Payne (born May 8, 1988) is an American former professional basketball player. He played college basketball for Citrus College and Santa Clara University, and played professionally in Australia and New Zealand.

== High school career ==
Payne attended Dorsey High School in Los Angeles, California, where as a senior in 2006–07, he averaged 16.7 points and 8.9 rebounds per game.

== College career ==
Payne played two seasons of college basketball for Citrus College, helping the Owls win a conference championship and a state title in his freshman season. He earned All-WSC Honorable Mention honors after averaging 6.9 points and a team-high 6.6 rebounds per game in 2007–08. As a sophomore in 2008–09, he was named to the first-team all-state JUCO team and was named the conference MVP. Citrus won back-to-back conference titles for the first time in school history and made a Sweet 16 appearance. Payne finished the season with averages of 10.0 points, 10.3 rebounds, 2.0 assists and 3.1 steals per game.

Payne transferred to Santa Clara for the 2009–10 season, going on to lead the team in steals (52) and being the only player to start every game. In 32 games, he averaged 4.4 points, 5.8 rebounds, 1.5 assists and 1.6 steals in 24.5 minutes per game. As a senior in 2010–11, he was named the WCC Defensive Player of the Year. In 38 games for the Broncos, he averaged 5.4 points, 5.9 rebounds, 1.1 assists and 1.6 steals in 24.5 minutes per game.

== Professional career ==
In November 2011, Payne spent preseason with the Los Angeles D-Fenders of the NBA Development League after being selected with the final pick in the D-League draft.

After working as an intern with the Cleveland Cavaliers basketball operations department during the 2011–12 NBA season, Payne signed to play in Australia in November 2012. He made his professional debut in 2013 with the NW Tasmania Thunder in the South East Australian Basketball League. In 28 games for the Thunder, he averaged 14.1 points, 8.4 rebounds and 2.9 assists per game.

In March 2014, Payne signed with the Otago Nuggets for the 2014 New Zealand NBL season. On April 21, 2014, he recorded a triple-double with 17 points, 12 assists, 10 rebounds and five steals in a 77–76 loss to the Wellington Saints. On May 22, 2014, he was released by the Nuggets. In eight games, he averaged 15.5 points, 10.5 rebounds, 3.5 assists and 3.1 steals per game.

== Personal ==
Payne is the son of Jerome Payne and the late Sandra Benjamin, and has six siblings: Tyrell, Jay, Andre and Monique Payne; and Tavon and Richard Walker.
