= Hewitt-Trussville Middle School =

Coordinates: 33°39′20.71″N 86°35′37.19″W

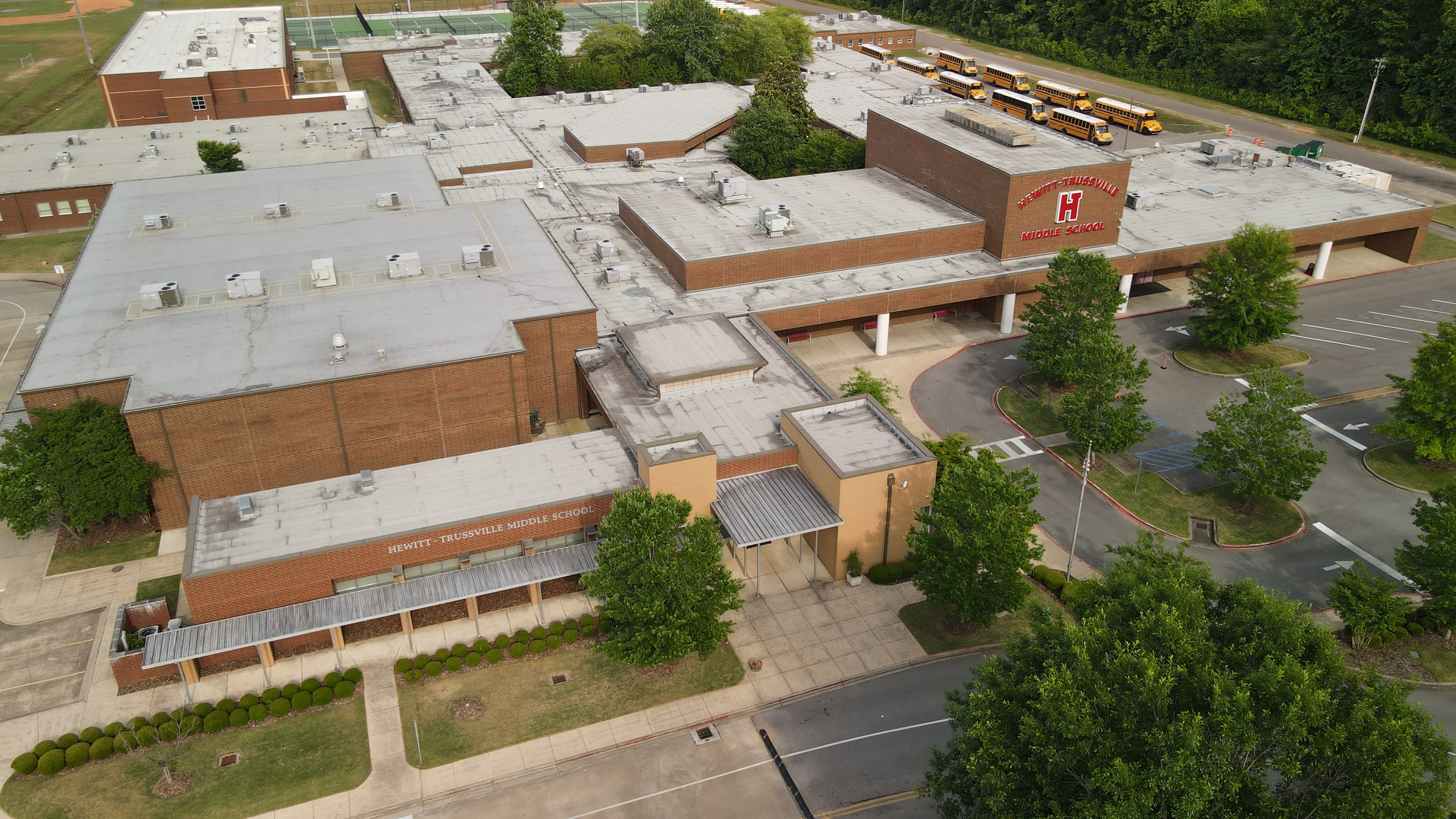

Location
- 5275 Trussville Clay Road; Trussville, Alabama 35173; United States

Information
- Type: Public
- Established: 1984
- School district: Trussville City Schools
- Principal: Mrs. Jennifer Abney
- Faculty: 68
- Grades: 6-8
- Enrollment: 1,198 (2020-21)
- Student to teacher ratio: 15:1
- Campus: Rural
- Colors: Red, gray, white
- Nickname: Huskies
- Feeder schools: Cahaba Elementary School; Magnolia Elementary School; Paine Elementary School
- Feeder to: Hewitt-Trussville High School
- Website: htms.tcsk12.us

Hewitt-Trussville Middle School (HTMS) is a public middle school serving grades 6-8 in the city of Trussville, Alabama. It is the only middle school in Trussville City Schools and is named for the early local educator Robert Hewitt. School colors are red and gray, and the athletic teams are called the Huskies.

All students from Cahaba, Magnolia, and Paine Elementary Schools are zoned to attend HTMS upon entering the sixth grade. HTMS students feed into Hewitt-Trussville High School upon entering the ninth grade.

== History ==
When Hewitt-Trussville High School was relocated to a new campus in 1984, its existing facility at 301 Parkway Drive was converted into a new middle school serving grades 5-7. Students from Hewitt Elementary School entered HTMS in the fifth grade and students from Clay and Chalkville Elementary Schools entered HTMS in the seventh grade. This continued until 1996 when Clay-Chalkville Middle School opened to serve students from Clay and Chalkville Elementary Schools.

From 1984 until 2001, HTMS students went on to attend Hewitt-Trussville Junior High School for the eighth grade. A sinkhole on the Hewitt-Trussville Junior High School campus resulted in that facility being demolished in 2002, moving the 9th grade to Hewitt-Trussville High School and the 8th grade to HTMS.

Like other schools in Trussville, HTMS was part of the Jefferson County School District until the City of Trussville formed its own school system in 2005. Trussville has constructed three elementary schools since breaking away from the Jefferson County School System, and all three of these feed into HTMS.

In 2008, a new Hewitt-Trussville High School facility opened off Deerfoot Parkway, at which point HTMS relocated to the former high school campus on Trussville Clay Road.

== Student profile ==
Enrollment in grades 6-8 for the 2020-2021 School Year is 1,198 students. Approximately 89% of students are white, 9% are African-American, 1% are Asian-American, and 1% are multiracial. Roughly 13% of students qualify for free or reduced-price lunch.

Approximately 91% of HTMS students meet or exceed state proficiency standards in mathematics, and 93% meet or exceed standards in reading.

== Athletics ==
HTMS fields teams in the following sports:

- Baseball (boys)
- Basketball (boys and girls)
- Cross Country (boys and girls)
- Football (boys)
- Golf (boys and girls)
- Indoor Track (boys and girls)
- Outdoor Track & Field (boys and girls)
- Softball (girls)
- Tennis (boys and girls)
- Volleyball (girls)
- Wrestling (boys and girls)

== Student activities ==
HTMS students can participate in a variety of extracurricular activities, including the following:

- Archery Team (Club)
- Band
- Choir
- Debate Team
- HTMS Student Ambassadors
- iCan Girls in Engineering
- Math Team
- National Junior Honor Society
- Student Council
- Scholars Bowl Team
- Science Olympiad Team
