= Trussville, Alabama =

City in Alabama, United States

- City
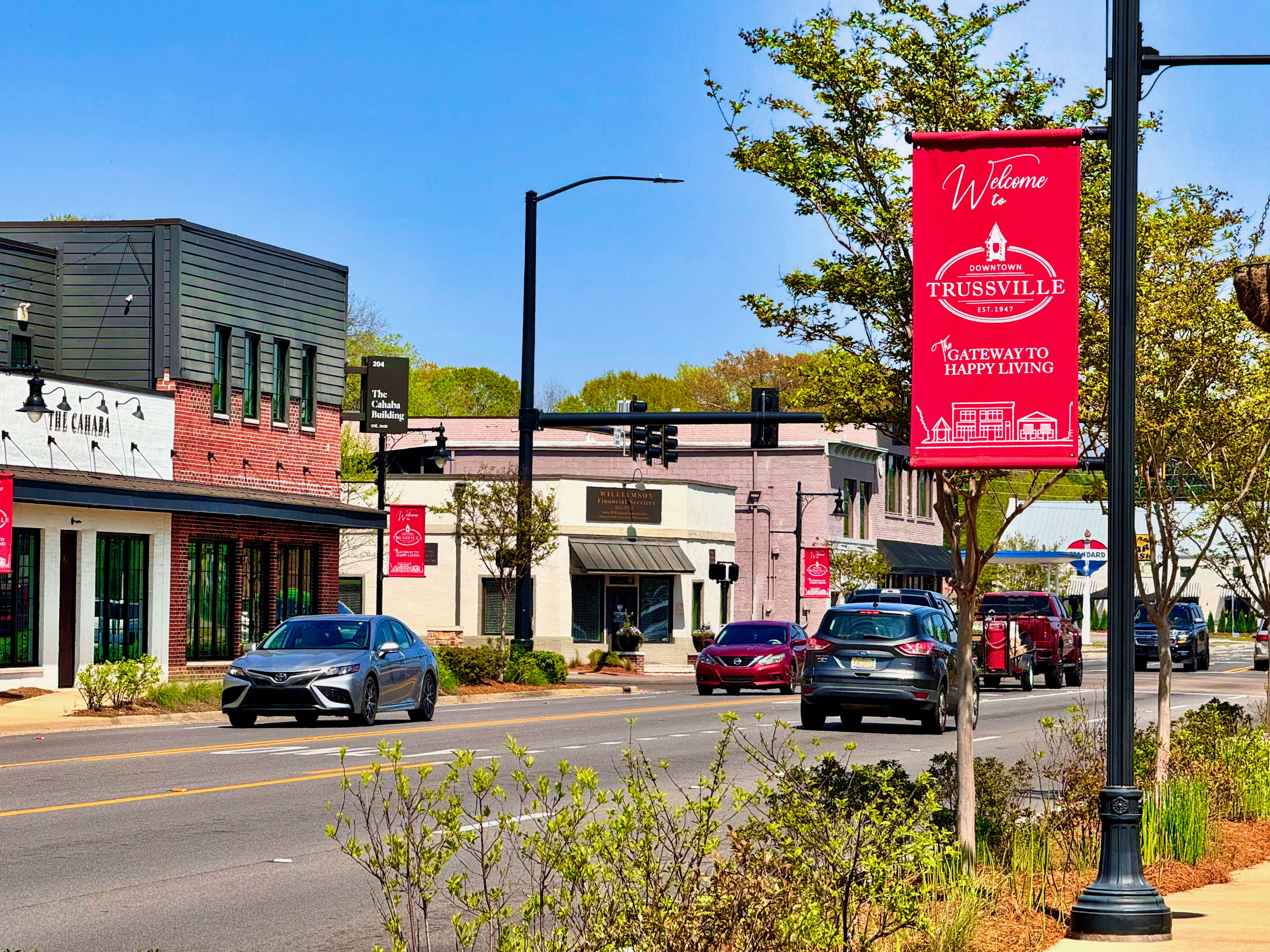
- Downtown Trussville

- Flag Seal
- Nickname: The Gateway to Happy Living
- Location of Trussville in Jefferson County and St. Clair County, Alabama.
- Coordinates: 33°37′18″N 86°35′47″W
- Country: United States
- State: Alabama
- Counties: Jefferson, St. Clair
- Settled: 1821
- Incorporated: 1947
- Named for: Warren Truss

Area
  - Total: 35.18 sq mi (91.12 km^{2})
  - Land: 34.67 sq mi (89.80 km^{2})
  - Water: 0.51 sq mi (1.32 km^{2})
- Elevation: 709 ft (216 m)

Population (2020)
  - Total: 26,123
  - Density: 753/sq mi (290.9/km^{2})
- ZIP code: 35173
- Area code: 205 & 659
- FIPS code: 01-76944
- GNIS feature ID: 2405608
- Website: http://www.trussville.org/

Trussville is a city in Jefferson and St. Clair counties in the State of Alabama. It is a suburb of Birmingham and part of the Birmingham-Hoover Metropolitan Statistical Area. Its population at the 2020 census was 26,123.

== History ==
=== Early settlement ===
The first European settler to establish residence in the area was Warren Truss, who entered the area with his brothers and constructed a grist mill on the Cahaba River in 1821. Truss was a North Carolina man of English descent. Trussville remained an agricultural community until after the Civil War, when the Alabama-Chattanooga Railway was built through the city. By 1886 a blast furnace was built on what is now the site of the new Cahaba Elementary School. Trussville was listed as an incorporated community on the 1890 and 1900 U.S. Census rolls. At some point after 1900 until its reincorporation in 1947, it did not appear on census records.

=== Cahaba Project ===
Much of Trussville's growth and development came from the Cahaba Project, a planned development of over 250 homes constructed by Franklin D. Roosevelt's Government Resettlement Administration during the 1930s. The Cahaba Project was originally planned by staff at the Alabama Polytechnic Institute to be a rural community of small farmsteads raising potatoes and vegetables. By the middle of the decade it was decided to locate the community close enough to Birmingham to commute by public transit, so the site in Trussville was chosen. About 60 existing houses were demolished, with white residents moved to the Roper Hill community and cottages for African-Americans built on a 40-acre tract northwest of the Cahaba Project called "Washington Heights" or, more commonly, "The Forties".

Local landscape architect W. H. Kestler designed a relatively dense suburban layout with 400 houses on 1/2 to 3/4 acre lots encircling a central green space called "The Mall". The design was approved in 1936 and constructed over the following two years. In all, 243 single-family houses and 44 duplexes were constructed at a total cost of $2,661,981.26. They were rented to approved lower-middle-income families for $14-$23 per month. The village featured paved streets, sidewalks and landscaped park areas. An entrance gateway with a covered gazebo was built at the corner of Main Street and Parkway Drive to serve as the community's "front door".

Most of the one- and two-level homes were constructed in the American four-square style with brick and wood siding, pine floors and metal roofs. Each house had electricity, hot-and-cold running water, and a sewer connection. Two oak saplings were given to each household to beautify their yards. During World War II many families planted Victory Gardens to supplement their grocery rations.

Oak furnishings and appliances were also available to renters at a nominal cost from the government. A back porch was supplied with a hose for a wringer-type washer. A communal washer was also available in a separate building on the mall. Other community facilities included a swimming pool, an elementary school and a high school, all built near the mall. A co-op store was erected near the high school, serving as a general store and lending library. Several churches were founded, including the Holy Infant of Prague Catholic Church.

The Cahaba Association, the Village residents' organization, elected community leaders, raised funds for civic projects, and published the Cahaba Hub newspaper. Many residents participated in an amateur softball league which made use of a lighted field on the mall. Resentment over the privileges given to residents of the government-funded Cahaba Project resulted in tensions between them and the "Old Trussville" families, many of whom lacked electricity and indoor plumbing. The presence of so many community facilities within the project limited interactions between the project's residents and their neighbors.

After World War II the government made plans to sell the houses to residents. It also offered undeveloped parcels for sale, giving veterans the first option at 10 percent down. The Cahaba Project was added to the National Register of Historic Places in 2006.

=== Incorporation and growth ===
On June 10, 1947, Trussville was incorporated as a town, and on May 31, 1957, the town officially became a city. It was on this date the City of Trussville was adopted as the official name.

Today Trussville is one of the Birmingham region's most rapidly growing areas. In the 30-year period between 1980 and 2010, the city grew by over 500%. It has seen much residential and retail construction, with two major shopping centers built during the early 2000s: the Colonial Promenade at Trussville on its western side and both the Colonial Promenade Tutwiler Farm and Pinnacle at Tutwiler Farm along Highway 11 at the I-59/I-459 interchange.

== Geography ==
According to the United States Census Bureau, the city has a total area of 22.3 square miles (58 km^{2}), of which 22.2 square miles (57 km^{2}) is land and 0.1 square miles (0.26 km^{2}) (0.27%) is water.

== Demographics ==
Historical population
Census	Pop.	Note	%±
1890	462		—
1900	742		60.6%
1950	1,575		—
1960	2,510		59.4%
1970	2,985		18.9%
1980	3,507		17.5%
1990	8,266		135.7%
2000	12,924		56.4%
2010	19,933		54.2%
2020	26,123		31.1%
2025 (est.)	27,273	▲	4.4%
U.S. Decennial Census

=== Racial and ethnic composition ===
Trussville city, Alabama – Racial and ethnic composition Note: the US Census treats Hispanic/Latino as an ethnic category. This table excludes Latinos from the racial categories and assigns them to a separate category. Hispanics/Latinos may be of any race.
Race / Ethnicity (NH = Non-Hispanic)	Pop 2000	Pop 2010	Pop 2020	% 2000	% 2010	% 2020
White alone (NH)	12,465	17,864	21,171	96.45%	89.62%	81.04%
Black or African American alone (NH)	190	1,300	2,866	1.47%	6.52%	10.97%
Native American or Alaska Native alone (NH)	40	33	47	0.31%	0.17%	0.18%
Asian alone (NH)	55	317	541	0.43%	1.59%	2.07%
Native Hawaiian or Pacific Islander alone (NH)	1	16	4	0.01%	0.08%	0.02%
Other race alone (NH)	2	13	60	0.02%	0.07%	0.23%
Mixed race or Multiracial (NH)	62	140	867	0.48%	0.70%	3.32%
Hispanic or Latino (any race)	109	250	567	0.84%	1.25%	2.17%
Total	12,924	19,933	26,123	100.00%	100.00%	100.00%

=== 2020 census ===
As of the 2020 census, Trussville had a population of 26,123 and 9,173 households, of which 6,094 were families. The median age was 40.1 years; 26.1% of residents were under the age of 18 and 17.0% of residents were 65 years of age or older. For every 100 females there were 91.7 males, and for every 100 females age 18 and over there were 87.8 males age 18 and over.

78.0% of residents lived in urban areas, while 22.0% lived in rural areas.

Of the city's 9,173 households, 40.8% had children under the age of 18 living in them. 69.1% were married-couple households, 8.7% were households with a male householder and no spouse or partner present, and 20.0% were households with a female householder and no spouse or partner present. About 16.9% of all households were made up of individuals and 9.3% had someone living alone who was 65 years of age or older.

There were 9,492 housing units, of which 3.4% were vacant. The homeowner vacancy rate was 1.3% and the rental vacancy rate was 9.4%.

Racial composition as of the 2020 census
Race	Number	Percent
White	21,312	81.6%
Black or African American	2,883	11.0%
American Indian and Alaska Native	53	0.2%
Asian	544	2.1%
Native Hawaiian and Other Pacific Islander	5	0.0%
Some other race	187	0.7%
Two or more races	1,139	4.4%
Hispanic or Latino (of any race)	567	2.2%

=== 2010 census ===
In 2010 the United States Census Bureau listed the Trussville population as 19,993, making it one of the fastest-growing cities in Jefferson County and Alabama. There were 19,933 people, 7,325 households, and 5,809 families residing in the city. The population density was 897.9 inhabitants per square mile (346.7/km^{2}). There were 7,667 housing units at an average density of 345.4 per square mile (133.4/km^{2}).

The racial makeup of the city was 90.3% White, 6.6% Black or African American, 0.2% Native American, 1.6% Asian, 0.1% Pacific Islander, 0.5% from other races, and 0.8% from two or more races. 1.3% of the population were Hispanic or Latino of any race.

There were 7,325 households, out of which 35.7% had children under the age of 18 living with them, 68.0% were married couples living together, 8.5% had a female householder with no husband present, and 20.7% were non-families. 18.4% of all households were made up of individuals, and 8.0% had someone living alone who was 65 years of age or older. The average household size was 2.70 and the average family size was 3.08.

In the city, the age distribution of the population shows 25.6% under the age of 18, 6.3% from 18 to 24, 24.9% from 25 to 44, 30.0% from 45 to 64, and 13.3% who were 65 years of age or older. The median age was 40.5 years. For every 100 females, there were 91.2 males. For every 100 females age 18 and over, there were 92.4 males.

== Economy ==
The 2014 median family income was $94,875, with 1.1% of families living below the poverty line. The unemployment rate was 5.8%, and the city's future job growth is predicted to be 32.3%. The city's sale tax rate is 10% and the income tax rate is 5%.

Approximately 88% of Trussville residents are employed in white collar occupations. The most popular jobs in Trussville are in sales and administration, which account for 28% of all positions. Management, business, and finance positions made up 24% of all jobs, followed by healthcare professionals at 9% and educators at 8%.

== Government ==
Trussville operates under a mayor/city council form of government. As of 2026, Trussville's mayor is Ben Short.

== Education ==
Trussville City Schools serve 4,269 students.

Trussville schools were part of the Jefferson County School System until 2005. In 2000, a financial crisis forced the county to reduce funding for teachers, and when the city of Trussville was not allowed to offset these reductions with its own funds, it began to explore the possibility of creating a separate system. In 2004, the city council passed a resolution that created the Trussville Board of Education, and in 2005, Trussville City Schools officially separated from the Jefferson County School System.

The system consists of five schools:

- Hewitt-Trussville High School (grades 9–12)
- Hewitt-Trussville Middle School (grades 6–8)
- Cahaba Elementary School (grades K-5)
- Magnolia Elementary School (grades K-5)
- Paine Elementary School (grades K-5)

== Media ==
The local newspaper is The Trussville Tribune. The Tribune, which covers crime, government, sports and community events in Trussville, Clay and Pinson, is published each Wednesday and provides news online.

== Notable people ==
- John Amari, judge and former member of both houses of the Alabama State Legislature
- Jay Barker, former quarterback for various teams
- Robert (Bobby) Bowden, former head coach of the Florida State Seminoles
- Brandon Cox, former quarterback for Auburn University
- Matt Dickey, professional basketball player
- Jordan Fisher, actor
- Omari Kelly, NFL player
- Brent Key, former guard and current head coach for the Georgia Tech football team
- Irene Latham, author of poetry and fiction for young adults
- Malachi Moore, strong safety for the Alabama Crimson Tide
- Mike Mordecai, former baseball player with three teams
- Robert J. Natter, United States Navy Admiral
- Jason Standridge, baseball player
- Trinity the Tuck, drag queen
- Justin Tubbs, former point guard for two teams
