= 2003–04 Sacramento Kings season =

NBA professional basketball team season

- Head coach: Rick Adelman
- President: Geoff Petrie
- General manager: Geoff Petrie
- Owners: Maloof family
- Arena: ARCO Arena

Results
- Record: 55–27 (.671)
- Place: Division: 2nd (Pacific); Conference: 4th (Western)
- Playoff finish: Conference semifinals (lost to Timberwolves 3–4)
- Stats at Basketball Reference

The 2003–04 Sacramento Kings season was the Kings' 55th season in the National Basketball Association, and their 19th season in Sacramento. During the off-season, the Kings acquired Brad Miller from the Indiana Pacers and signed free agent Anthony Peeler. Superstar forward Chris Webber, who spent most of the season recovering from microfracture knee surgery, then serving a suspension due to the Ed Martin scandal, returned for the final 23 games of the season.

Still, the Kings finished the season second in the Pacific Division with a 55–27 record. Miller and Peja Stojaković were both selected for the 2004 NBA All-Star Game. In the first round of the playoffs, the Kings defeated the Dallas Mavericks in five games, before falling to league MVP Kevin Garnett and the Minnesota Timberwolves in the second round as Webber missed a potential game-tying 3-pointer in Game 7. This ended the Kings' attempt at a championship as their core would be dismantled the following season, which included Vlade Divac re-signing as a free agent with the Los Angeles Lakers, Peeler signing with the Washington Wizards, and Gerald Wallace leaving in the 2004 NBA expansion draft.

== Offseason ==
=== Draft picks ===
The Kings had no draft picks in 2003.

== Roster ==
2003–04 Sacramento Kings roster
Players

Pos.	No.	Player	Height	Weight	DOB	From
PG	10	Mike Bibby	6 ft 1 in (1.85 m)	190 lb (86 kg)	1978-05-13	Arizona
SF	32	Rodney Buford	6 ft 5 in (1.96 m)	189 lb (86 kg)	1977-11-02	Creighton
SG	13	Doug Christie	6 ft 6 in (1.98 m)	200 lb (91 kg)	1970-05-09	Pepperdine
C	21	Vlade Divac	7 ft 1 in (2.16 m)	243 lb (110 kg)	1968-02-03	Serbia
SG	24	Bobby Jackson	6 ft 1 in (1.85 m)	185 lb (84 kg)	1973-03-13	Minnesota
PF	34	Tony Massenburg	6 ft 9 in (2.06 m)	220 lb (100 kg)	1967-07-31	Maryland
C	52	Brad Miller	6 ft 11 in (2.11 m)	244 lb (111 kg)	1976-04-12	Purdue
SG	8	Anthony Peeler	6 ft 4 in (1.93 m)	208 lb (94 kg)	1969-11-25	Missouri
C	55	Jabari Smith	6 ft 11 in (2.11 m)	250 lb (113 kg)	1977-02-17	LSU
PF	25	Darius Songaila	6 ft 9 in (2.06 m)	248 lb (112 kg)	1978-02-14	Wake Forest
SF	16	Peja Stojakovic	6 ft 9 in (2.06 m)	220 lb (100 kg)	1977-06-09	Serbia
SF	3	Gerald Wallace	6 ft 7 in (2.01 m)	215 lb (98 kg)	1982-07-23	Alabama
PF	4	Chris Webber	6 ft 10 in (2.08 m)	245 lb (111 kg)	1973-03-01	Michigan

Coaches
Head coach
- Rick Adelman
Assistant(s)
- Bubba Burrage
- Pete Carril
- Elston Turner
- John Wetzel

Legend
- (DP) Unsigned draft pick
- (FA) Free agent
- (S) Suspended
- Injured

Roster
Updated: February 23, 2004

== Regular season ==
=== Season standings ===
Pacific Division	W	L	PCT	GB	Home	Road	Div
y-Los Angeles Lakers	56	26	.683	–	34–7	22–19	15–9
x-Sacramento Kings	55	27	.671	1	34–7	21–20	16–8
e-Portland Trail Blazers	41	41	.500	15	25–16	16–25	13–11
e-Seattle SuperSonics	37	45	.451	19	21–20	16–25	11–13
e-Golden State Warriors	37	45	.451	19	27–14	10–31	12–12
e-Phoenix Suns	29	53	.354	27	18–23	11–30	9–15
e-Los Angeles Clippers	28	54	.341	28	18–23	10–31	8–16

#	Western Conference				
#	Team	W	L	PCT	GB
1	c-Minnesota Timberwolves	58	24	.707	–
2	y-Los Angeles Lakers	56	26	.683	2
3	x-San Antonio Spurs	57	25	.695	1
4	x-Sacramento Kings	55	27	.671	3
5	x-Dallas Mavericks	52	30	.634	6
6	x-Memphis Grizzlies	50	32	.610	8
7	x-Houston Rockets	45	37	.549	13
8	x-Denver Nuggets	43	39	.524	15
9	e-Utah Jazz	42	40	.512	16
10	e-Portland Trail Blazers	41	41	.500	17
11	e-Seattle SuperSonics	37	45	.451	21
12	e-Golden State Warriors	37	45	.451	21
13	e-Phoenix Suns	29	53	.354	29
14	e-Los Angeles Clippers	28	54	.341	30

z – clinched division title
y – clinched division title
x – clinched playoff spot

=== Game log ===
2003–04 game log
Total: 55–27 (home: 34–7; road: 21–20)
October: 2–0 (home: 2–0; road: 0–0)

Game	Date	Team	Score	High points	High rebounds	High assists	Location Attendance	Record
1	October 29	Cleveland	W 106–92	Peja Stojaković (22)	Brad Miller (9)	Mike Bibby (7)	ARCO Arena; 17,317	1–0
2	October 31	Philadelphia	W 100–89	Peja Stojaković (28)	Brad Miller (9)	Bibby, Miller (5)	ARCO Arena; 17,317	2–0

November: 10–4 (home: 8–0; road: 2–4)

Game	Date	Team	Score	High points	High rebounds	High assists	Location Attendance	Record
3	November 1	@ Denver	L 88–109	Peja Stojaković (19)	Brad Miller (12)	Mike Bibby (10)	Pepsi Center; 18,111	2–1
4	November 5	@ Minnesota	W 125–121 (OT)	Peja Stojaković (34)	Miller, Divac (8)	Vlade Divac (10)	Target Center; 15,889	3–1
5	November 7	@ New York	L 111–114	Peja Stojaković (36)	Vlade Divac (7)	Doug Christie (9)	Madison Square Garden; 19,333	3–2
6	November 9	@ Boston	L 82–91	Brad Miller (19)	Brad Miller (16)	Mike Bibby (11)	FleetCenter; 16,502	3–3
7	November 11	Detroit	W 97–91	Mike Bibby (23)	Peja Stojaković (10)	Vlade Divac (9)	ARCO Arena; 17,317	4–3
8	November 13	@ Portland	L 110–112 (OT)	Peja Stojaković (27)	Miller, Massenburg (7)	Mike Bibby (15)	Rose Garden; 17,422	4–4
9	November 14	Toronto	W 94–64	Peja Stojaković (17)	Brad Miller (12)	Divac, Jackson (6)	ARCO Arena; 17,317	5–4
10	November 16	Golden State	W 106–104	Peja Stojaković (33)	Peja Stojaković (11)	Brad Miller (11)	ARCO Arena; 17,317	6–4
11	November 19	@ Utah	W 118–110	Peja Stojaković (30)	Brad Miller (13)	Brad Miller (8)	Delta Center; 17,664	7–4
12	November 21	Orlando	W 122–92	Brad Miller (22)	Brad Miller (14)	Brad Miller (10)	ARCO Arena; 17,317	8–4
13	November 23	Chicago	W 110–99	Peja Stojaković (21)	Brad Miller (10)	Miller, Bibby (7)	ARCO Arena; 17,317	9–4
14	November 25	Memphis	W 109–89	Peja Stojaković (26)	Peja Stojaković (9)	Mike Bibby (6)	ARCO Arena; 17,317	10–4
15	November 28	Houston	W 103–74	Brad Miller (29)	Miller, Christie (7)	Bibby, Divac (6)	ARCO Arena; 17,317	11–4
16	November 30	New Jersey	W 105–92	Peja Stojaković (25)	Brad Miller (11)	Vlade Divac (8)	ARCO Arena; 17,317	12–4

December: 9–4 (home: 6–2; road: 3–2)

Game	Date	Team	Score	High points	High rebounds	High assists	Location Attendance	Record
17	December 5	Minnesota	L 109–112 (OT)	Brad Miller (35)	Peja Stojaković (11)	Stojaković, Divac (4)	ARCO Arena; 17,317	12–5
18	December 7	Indiana	W 91–88	Peja Stojaković (27)	Brad Miller (15)	Brad Miller (10)	ARCO Arena; 17,317	13–5
19	December 9	L.A. Clippers	W 105–95	Peja Stojaković (26)	Mike Bibby (7)	Bibby, Divac (6)	ARCO Arena; 17,317	14–5
20	December 12	@ Utah	W 100–93	Mike Bibby (25)	Stojaković, Miller (8)	Vlade Divac (6)	Delta Center; 19,678	15–5
21	December 14	Phoenix	W 107–102	Peja Stojaković (36)	Miller, Jackson (9)	Mike Bibby (6)	ARCO Arena; 17,317	16–5
22	December 16	@ Memphis	L 100–105	Peja Stojaković (27)	Brad Miller (16)	Doug Christie (6)	Pyramid Arena; 11,210	16–6
23	December 18	@ New Orleans	W 101–90	Brad Miller (21)	Brad Miller (14)	Brad Miller (9)	New Orleans Arena; 13,769	17–6
24	December 19	@ Atlanta	W 98–86	Peja Stojaković (31)	Brad Miller (12)	Vlade Divac (8)	Philips Arena; 11,666	18–6
25	December 21	Portland	W 117–98	Peja Stojaković (29)	Brad Miller (14)	Bibby, Divac (7)	ARCO Arena; 17,317	19–6
26	December 23	Memphis	W 114–97	Peja Stojaković (41)	Brad Miller (17)	Brad Miller (6)	ARCO Arena; 17,317	20–6
27	December 25	Dallas	L 103–111	Mike Bibby (23)	Brad Miller (12)	Brad Miller (9)	ARCO Arena; 17,317	20–7
28	December 26	@ Golden State	L 91–98	Mike Bibby (28)	Brad Miller (10)	Doug Christie (7)	The Arena in Oakland; 20,192	20–8
29	December 28	Utah	W 98–89	Peja Stojaković (37)	Doug Christie (9)	Doug Christie (9)	ARCO Arena; 17,317	21–8

January: 12–4 (home: 5–1; road: 7–3)

Game	Date	Team	Score	High points	High rebounds	High assists	Location Attendance	Record
30	January 3	@ L.A. Clippers	W 116–109	Mike Bibby (24)	Brad Miller (11)	Doug Christie (10)	Staples Center; 18,252	22–8
31	January 4	Seattle	W 130–99	Peja Stojaković (24)	Brad Miller (11)	Doug Christie (8)	ARCO Arena; 17,317	23–8
32	January 6	Atlanta	W 105–89	Peja Stojaković (28)	Brad Miller (10)	Vlade Divac (10)	ARCO Arena; 17,317	24–8
33	January 7	@ Seattle	L 93–104	Stojaković, Bibby (19)	Brad Miller (17)	Mike Bibby (7)	KeyArena; 15,035	24–9
34	January 9	@ Phoenix	W 113–93	Peja Stojaković (29)	Peja Stojaković (12)	Mike Bibby (9)	America West Arena; 16,848	25–9
35	January 11	Denver	W 117–106	Peja Stojaković (33)	Peja Stojaković (8)	Vlade Divac (9)	ARCO Arena; 17,317	26–9
36	January 13	Miami	W 90–86	Peja Stojaković (24)	Brad Miller (9)	Brad Miller (7)	ARCO Arena; 17,317	27–9
37	January 16	L.A. Lakers	W 103–83	Peja Stojaković (23)	Brad Miller (14)	Vlade Divac (7)	ARCO Arena; 17,317	28–9
38	January 19	@ L.A. Clippers	W 125–100	Peja Stojaković (31)	Brad Miller (8)	Christie, Divac (8)	Staples Center; 17,325	29–9
39	January 20	Portland	L 104–109 (OT)	Peja Stojaković (34)	Bobby Jackson (10)	Vlade Divac (7)	ARCO Arena; 17,317	29–10
40	January 22	@ Cleveland	W 95–89	Peja Stojaković (37)	Brad Miller (15)	Vlade Divac (9)	Gund Arena; 17,720	30–10
41	January 23	@ Memphis	L 95–109	Vlade Divac (17)	Vlade Divac (12)	Peja Stojaković (5)	Pyramid Arena; 17,119	30–11
42	January 25	@ Dallas	L 99–108	Peja Stojaković (24)	Brad Miller (17)	Mike Bibby (6)	American Airlines Center; 20,284	30–12
43	January 28	@ Houston	W 99–94	Mike Bibby (28)	Peja Stojaković (9)	Brad Miller (6)	Toyota Center; 18,209	31–12
44	January 29	@ San Antonio	W 96–91	Peja Stojaković (22)	Vlade Divac (9)	Vlade Divac (9)	SBC Center; 17,669	32–12
45	January 31	@ Seattle	W 110–103	Peja Stojaković (29)	Brad Miller (17)	Bibby, Peeler (5)	KeyArena; 17,072	33–12

February: 10–3 (home: 5–2; road: 5–1)

Game	Date	Team	Score	High points	High rebounds	High assists	Location Attendance	Record
46	February 3	Seattle	W 117–101	Peja Stojaković (26)	Brad Miller (15)	Vlade Divac (11)	ARCO Arena; 17,317	34–12
47	February 6	San Antonio	L 94–102	Stojaković, Divac, Bibby (20)	Brad Miller (11)	Mike Bibby (6)	ARCO Arena; 17,317	34–13
48	February 8	Denver	W 115–92	Peja Stojaković (35)	Miller, Divac (10)	Christie, Bibby (8)	ARCO Arena; 17,317	35–13
49	February 10	@ Milwaukee	W 124–117	Peja Stojaković (31)	Brad Miller (8)	Bibby, Divac (11)	Bradley Center; 17,407	36–13
50	February 11	@ Detroit	W 96–94	Mike Bibby (26)	Brad Miller (15)	Vlade Divac (11)	The Palace of Auburn Hills; 22,076	37–13
51	February 17	Boston	W 127–111	Peja Stojaković (28)	Vlade Divac (11)	Vlade Divac (11)	ARCO Arena; 17,317	38–13
52	February 19	@ Minnesota	L 75–92	Peja Stojaković (15)	Vlade Divac (8)	Mike Bibby (7)	Target Center; 18,667	38–14
53	February 20	@ Chicago	W 91–83	Peja Stojaković (24)	Vlade Divac (11)	Vlade Divac (11)	United Center; 20,172	39–14
54	February 22	@ Toronto	W 96–81	Peja Stojaković (27)	Songaila, Massenburg (10)	Vlade Divac (12)	Air Canada Centre; 19,800	40–14
55	February 24	New York	W 107–99	Mike Bibby (28)	Darius Songaila (13)	Vlade Divac (9)	ARCO Arena; 17,317	41–14
56	February 26	@ L.A. Lakers	W 103–101	Peja Stojaković (37)	Peja Stojaković (9)	Vlade Divac (10)	Staples Center; 18,997	42–14
57	February 27	Utah	L 97–102	Mike Bibby (26)	Vlade Divac (8)	Vlade Divac (7)	ARCO Arena; 17,317	42–15
58	February 29	Phoenix	W 108–94	Peja Stojaković (32)	Brad Miller (10)	Christie, Divac (9)	ARCO Arena; 17,317	43–15

March: 9–7 (home: 6–1; road: 3–6)

Game	Date	Team	Score	High points	High rebounds	High assists	Location Attendance	Record
59	March 2	L.A. Clippers	W 113–106	Chris Webber (26)	Chris Weber (12)	Vlade Divac (8)	ARCO Arena; 17,317	44–15
60	March 4	@ Philadelphia	W 114–105	Peja Stojaković (27)	Brad Miller (7)	Chris Webber (10)	Wachovia Center; 18,798	45–15
61	March 6	@ Miami	L 96–102	Mike Bibby (24)	Brad Miller (11)	Doug Christie (6)	American Airlines Arena; 16,508	45–16
62	March 7	@ Orlando	W 107–90	Peja Stojaković (28)	Brad Miller (13)	Doug Christie (12)	TD Waterhouse Centre; 15,625	46–16
63	March 9	Golden State	W 96–92	Doug Christie (23)	Chris Webber (11)	Doug Christie (6)	ARCO Arena; 17,317	47–16
64	March 11	Dallas	W 120–102	Christie, Stojaković (22)	Chris Webber (8)	Doug Christie (12)	ARCO Arena; 17,317	48–16
65	March 12	@ Portland	L 81–83	Peja Stojaković (18)	Peja Stojaković (9)	Mike Bibby (8)	Rose Garden; 20,308	48–17
66	March 14	San Antonio	W 101–87	Mike Bibby (24)	Brad Miller (13)	Chris Webber (5)	ARCO Arena; 17,317	49–17
67	March 16	@ New Jersey	L 77–94	Mike Bibby (17)	Chris Webber (9)	Mike Bibby (5)	Continental Airlines Arena; 16,949	49–18
68	March 17	@ Washington	L 108–114	Peja Stojaković (25)	Brad Miller (8)	Doug Christie (7)	MCI Center; 15,255	49–19
69	March 19	@ Indiana	W 94–92	Mike Bibby (25)	Chris Webber (16)	Chris Webber (8)	Conseco Fieldhouse; 18,345	50–19
70	March 21	Houston	W 100–95	Peja Stojaković (29)	Chris Webber (15)	Mike Bibby (7)	ARCO Arena; 17,317	51–19
71	March 23	Milwaukee	L 101–112	Mike Bibby (27)	Chris Webber (10)	Chris Webber (8)	ARCO Arena; 17,317	51–20
72	March 24	@ L.A. Lakers	L 91–115	Peja Stojaković (20)	Peja Stojaković (8)	Mike Bibby (6)	Staples Center; 18,997	51–21
73	March 28	Washington	W 100–92	Peja Stojaković (29)	Peja Stojaković (11)	Bibby, Webber (7)	ARCO Arena; 17,317	52–21
74	March 31	@ San Antonio	L 89–107	Peja Stojaković (19)	Darius Songaila (9)	Chris Webber (6)	SBC Center; 18,797	52–22

April: 3–5 (home: 2–1; road: 1–4)

Game	Date	Team	Score	High points	High rebounds	High assists	Location Attendance	Record
75	April 1	@ Dallas	L 117–127	Mike Bibby (23)	Chris Webber (11)	Doug Christie (9)	American Airlines Center; 20,533	52–23
76	April 4	@ Houston	W 99–94	Peja Stojaković (28)	Peja Stojaković (11)	Webber, Christie, Divac (6)	Toyota Center; 18,148	53–23
77	April 6	New Orleans	W 105–91	Peja Stojaković (26)	Brad Miller (10)	Chris Webber (6)	ARCO Arena; 17,317	54–23
78	April 8	Minnesota	L 86–94	Chris Webber (21)	Chris Webber (11)	Mike Bibby (7)	ARCO Aena; 17,317	54–24
79	April 9	@ Phoenix	L 96–101	Mike Bibby (26)	Brad Miller (15)	Brad Miller (6)	America West Arena; 18,422	54–25
80	April 11	L.A. Lakers	W 102–85	Chris Webber (25)	Chris Webber (12)	Mike Bibby (8)	ARCO Arena; 17,317	55–25
81	April 12	@ Denver	L 89–97	Peja Stojaković (20)	Brad Miller (8)	Doug Christie (8)	Pepsi Center; 19,746	55–26
82	April 14	@ Golden State	L 91–97	Peja Stojaković (27)	Brad Miller (11)	Brad Miller (7)	The Arena in Oakland; 19,831	55–27

2003–04 schedule

== Playoffs ==
Sacramento's win over Dallas is their most recent playoff series victory to date; in fact, the Kings failed to qualify for the NBA playoffs at all from 2006 to 2023.

2004 playoff game log
First round: 4–1 (home: 3–0; road: 1–1)

Game	Date	Team	Score	High points	High rebounds	High assists	Location Attendance	Series
1	April 18	Dallas	W 116–105	Peja Stojaković (28)	Chris Webber (12)	Doug Christie (11)	ARCO Arena; 17,317	1–0
2	April 20	Dallas	W 83–79	Mike Bibby (24)	Chris Webber (13)	Chris Webber (12)	ARCO Arena; 17,317	2–0
3	April 24	@ Dallas	L 79–104	Bibby, Webber (22)	Peja Stojaković (8)	Doug Christie (4)	American Airlines Center; 20,580	2–1
4	April 26	@ Dallas	W 94–92	Mike Bibby (22)	Brad Miller (16)	three players tied (5)	American Airlines Center; 20,677	3–1
5	April 29	Dallas	W 119–118	Mike Bibby (36)	Peja Stojaković (10)	Bibby, Christie (8)	ARCO Arena; 17,317	4–1

Conference Semi-finals: 3–4 (home: 2–1; road: 1–3)

Game	Date	Team	Score	High points	High rebounds	High assists	Location Attendance	Series
1	May 4	@ Minnesota	W 104–98	Mike Bibby (33)	Brad Miller (10)	Mike Bibby (7)	Target Center; 18,792	1–0
2	May 8	@ Minnesota	L 89–94	Peja Stojaković (26)	Brad Miller (11)	Mike Bibby (8)	Target Center; 19,599	1–1
3	May 10	Minnesota	L 113–114 (OT)	Peja Stojaković (29)	Doug Christie (12)	Mike Bibby (10)	ARCO Arena; 17,317	1–2
4	May 12	Minnesota	W 87–81	Chris Webber (28)	Chris Webber (8)	Mike Bibby (12)	ARCO Arena; 17,317	2–2
5	May 14	@ Minnesota	L 74–86	Mike Bibby (14)	Brad Miller (10)	Mike Bibby (6)	Target Center; 19,318	2–3
6	May 16	Minnesota	W 104–87	Peja Stojaković (22)	Peja Stojaković (8)	Mike Bibby (10)	ARCO Arena; 17,317	3–3
7	May 19	@ Minnesota	L 80–83	Doug Christie (21)	three players tied (8)	Mike Bibby (8)	Target Center; 19,944	3–4

2004 schedule

== Player statistics ==
Legend
GP	Games played	GS	Games started	MPG	Minutes per game
FG%	Field-goal percentage	3P%	3-point field-goal percentage	FT%	Free-throw percentage
RPG	Rebounds per game	APG	Assists per game	SPG	Steals per game
BPG	Blocks per game	PPG	Points per game

=== Season ===
Player	GP	GS	MPG	FG%	3P%	FT%	RPG	APG	SPG	BPG	PPG
Mike Bibby	82	82	36.3	.450	.392	.815	3.4	5.4	1.4	0.2	18.4
Rodney Buford	22	0	6.4	.339	.000	.500	0.7	0.3	0.3	0.0	1.9
Doug Christie	82	82	33.9	.461	.345	.860	4.0	4.2	1.8	0.5	10.1
Vlade Divac	81	81	28.6	.470	.154	.654	5.7	5.3	0.7	1.0	9.9
Bobby Jackson	50	0	23.7	.444	.370	.752	3.5	2.1	1.0	0.2	13.8
Tony Massenburg	59	0	13.4	.475	.000	.683	3.2	0.5	0.2	0.3	4.3
Brad Miller	72	53	36.4	.510	.316	.778	10.3	4.3	0.9	1.2	14.1
Anthony Peeler	75	0	18.5	.448	.482	.836	2.0	1.6	0.7	0.1	5.7
Jabari Smith	31	0	5.4	.371	.000	.600	1.0	0.4	0.1	0.2	2.1
Darius Songaila	73	7	13.4	.487		.807	3.1	0.7	0.6	0.2	4.6
Peja Stojaković	81	81	40.3	.480	.433	.927	6.3	2.1	1.3	0.2	24.2
Gerald Wallace	37	1	9.1	.360	.000	.458	2.0	0.5	0.4	0.4	2.0
Chris Webber	23	23	36.1	.413	.200	.711	8.7	4.6	1.3	0.9	18.7

=== Playoffs ===
Player	GP	GS	MPG	FG%	3P%	FT%	RPG	APG	SPG	BPG	PPG
Mike Bibby	12	12	41.4	.429	.436	.873	4.2	7.0	1.9	0.4	20.0
Rodney Buford	5	0	6.4	.417	.333	.500	1.0	0.6	0.4	0.0	2.4
Doug Christie	12	12	38.4	.397	.394	.854	4.8	6.2	3.9	1.8	13.8
Vlade Divac	12	12	19.6	.437		.739	4.9	1.8	0.3	0.4	6.6
Brad Miller	12	0	30.5	.527	.143	.604	8.7	3.2	0.8	0.9	10.5
Anthony Peeler	11	0	21.5	.302	.269	.833	3.2	1.4	1.3	0.2	4.5
Jabari Smith	4	0	2.5	.500		.750	0.8	0.0	0.0	0.3	1.3
Darius Songaila	7	0	12.1	.625		1.000	1.9	0.3	0.0	0.1	3.7
Peja Stojaković	12	12	43.1	.384	.315	.897	7.0	1.5	1.8	0.3	17.5
Gerald Wallace	3	0	6.7	.500		.500	0.7	0.3	0.3	0.3	2.3
Chris Webber	12	12	37.2	.452	.250	.615	8.3	3.7	1.3	0.8	18.4

== See also ==
- 2003–04 NBA season
