= 2003–04 Minnesota Timberwolves season =

NBA professional basketball team season

- Division champions
- Head coach: Flip Saunders
- General manager: Kevin McHale
- Owner: Glen Taylor
- Arena: Target Center

Results
- Record: 58–24 (.707)
- Place: Division: 1st (Midwest); Conference: 1st (Western)
- Playoff finish: Western Conference Finals (lost to Lakers 2–4)
- Stats at Basketball Reference

Local media
- Television: Fox Sports North
- Radio: KFAN

The 2003–04 Minnesota Timberwolves season was the 15th season for the franchise in the National Basketball Association (NBA). The season is one of the most memorable in Timberwolves history. During the offseason, the Timberwolves acquired 4-time All-Star guard Latrell Sprewell. The arrival was seen as controversial as Sprewell was known for his choking incident with then-Golden State Warriors head coach P. J. Carlesimo, though also known for helping the 8th-seeded New York Knicks to the NBA Finals in 1999. Sam Cassell, who was known for winning two championships with the Houston Rockets, and his tenure with the Milwaukee Bucks, where he helped guide the Bucks to the Eastern Conference finals in 2001, also was acquired to join Garnett, forming a "Big 3". The Timberwolves also signed free agents - former Number 1 Overall pick (in the 1998 draft) Michael Olowakandi and Trenton Hassell. With a Western Conference-best 58-24 finish, the Wolves set the franchise record for wins, and won its first and only division championship. Power forward Kevin Garnett averaged 24.2 points, a league-high 13.9 rebounds, 5.0 assists, 1.5 steals, and 2.2 blocks per game, winning the regular season Most Valuable Player Award.

In the first round of the playoffs, the Timberwolves defeated the Denver Nuggets in five games, which was their first ever win in a playoff series. The Wolves were then pushed to the limit in the semi-finals by the Sacramento Kings, who they narrowly defeated in a deciding seventh game. In the Western Conference Finals, they faced the Los Angeles Lakers, who had defeated them in the prior season's first round in six games. The Lakers team, known for its star-studded starting lineup consisting of Shaquille O'Neal, Kobe Bryant, Gary Payton, and Karl Malone, bested the Wolves in six games, where they would then would go on to lose in the NBA Finals against the Detroit Pistons in five games. Garnett, Cassell, and head coach Flip Saunders represented the Western Conference in the 2004 NBA All-Star Game. The 2004 All-Star Game was Cassell's only NBA All-Star appearance in his entire career.

After this season, the Timberwolves would not reign victorious in another playoff series until 2024, experiencing a lengthy drought of 21 seasons in which the Timberwolves would go on to defeat the Denver Nuggets in 7 games to advance to the Western Conference Finals for the first time in two decades. It would be 14 seasons, until 2018, before the Wolves would make the playoffs again.

== Offseason ==
=== NBA draft ===
Round	Pick	Player	Position	Nationality	College
1	26	Ndudi Ebi	Forward	Nigeria	
2	55	Rick Rickert	Forward	United States	Minnesota

== Roster ==
2003–04 Minnesota Timberwolves roster
Players

Pos.	No.	Player	Height	Weight	DOB	From
PG	19	Sam Cassell	6 ft 3 in (1.91 m)	185 lb (84 kg)	1969-11-18	Florida State
SF	44	Ndudi Ebi	6 ft 9 in (2.06 m)	200 lb (91 kg)	1984-06-18	Westbury Christian HS (TX)
PF	21	Kevin Garnett	6 ft 11 in (2.11 m)	220 lb (100 kg)	1976-05-19	Farragut Academy (IL)
SG	23	Trenton Hassell	6 ft 5 in (1.96 m)	200 lb (91 kg)	1979-03-04	Austin Peay
SG	32	Fred Hoiberg	6 ft 4 in (1.93 m)	203 lb (92 kg)	1972-10-15	Iowa State
PG	16	Troy Hudson	6 ft 1 in (1.85 m)	170 lb (77 kg)	1976-03-13	Southern Illinois
C	40	Ervin Johnson	6 ft 11 in (2.11 m)	245 lb (111 kg)	1967-12-21	LSU New Orleans
C	35	Mark Madsen	6 ft 9 in (2.06 m)	240 lb (109 kg)	1976-01-28	Stanford
PG	15	Darrick Martin	5 ft 11 in (1.80 m)	170 lb (77 kg)	1971-03-06	UCLA
C	3	Oliver Miller	6 ft 9 in (2.06 m)	280 lb (127 kg)	1970-04-06	Arkansas
C	34	Michael Olowokandi	7 ft 0 in (2.13 m)	269 lb (122 kg)	1975-04-03	Pacific
SF	8	Latrell Sprewell	6 ft 5 in (1.96 m)	190 lb (86 kg)	1970-09-08	Alabama
SF	10	Wally Szczerbiak	6 ft 7 in (2.01 m)	244 lb (111 kg)	1977-03-05	Miami (OH)
C	20	Gary Trent	6 ft 8 in (2.03 m)	250 lb (113 kg)	1974-09-22	Ohio

Coaches
Head coach
- Flip Saunders
Assistant(s)
- Greg Ballard
- Jerry Sichting
- Randy Wittman
- Don Zierden
- Gregg Farnam (trainer)

Legend
- (DP) Unsigned draft pick
- (FA) Free agent
- (S) Suspended
- Injured

Roster
Updated: January 30, 2004

== Regular season ==
=== Standings ===
Midwest Division	W	L	PCT	GB	Home	Road	Div
y-Minnesota Timberwolves	58	24	.707	–	31–10	27–14	14–10
x-San Antonio Spurs	57	25	.695	1	33–8	24–17	15–9
x-Dallas Mavericks	52	30	.634	6	36–5	16–25	14–10
x-Memphis Grizzlies	50	32	.610	8	31–10	19–22	12–12
x-Houston Rockets	45	37	.549	13	27–14	18–23	8–16
x-Denver Nuggets	43	39	.524	15	29–12	14–27	11–13
e-Utah Jazz	42	40	.512	16	28–13	14–27	10–14

#	Western Conference				
#	Team	W	L	PCT	GB
1	c-Minnesota Timberwolves	58	24	.707	–
2	y-Los Angeles Lakers	56	26	.683	2
3	x-San Antonio Spurs	57	25	.695	1
4	x-Sacramento Kings	55	27	.671	3
5	x-Dallas Mavericks	52	30	.634	6
6	x-Memphis Grizzlies	50	32	.610	8
7	x-Houston Rockets	45	37	.549	13
8	x-Denver Nuggets	43	39	.524	15
9	e-Utah Jazz	42	40	.512	16
10	e-Portland Trail Blazers	41	41	.500	17
11	e-Seattle SuperSonics	37	45	.451	21
12	e-Golden State Warriors	37	45	.451	21
13	e-Phoenix Suns	29	53	.354	29
14	e-Los Angeles Clippers	28	54	.341	30

=== Game log ===
2003–04 game log
Total: 58–24 (home: 31–10; road: 27–14)
October: 1–1 (home: 1–0; road: 0–1)

Game	Date	Team	Score	High points	High rebounds	High assists	Location Attendance	Record
1	October 29	Milwaukee	W 95–89	Kevin Garnett (25)	Kevin Garnett (21)	Sam Cassell (9)	Target Center; 17,784	1–0
2	October 31	@ New Jersey	L 61–84	Kevin Garnett (23)	Latrell Sprewell (10)	Sam Cassell (7)	Continental Airlines Arena; 17,145	1–1

November: 8–7 (home: 3–4; road: 5–3)

Game	Date	Team	Score	High points	High rebounds	High assists	Location Attendance	Record
3	November 1	Toronto	W 73–56	Kevin Garnett (20)	Kevin Garnett (7)	Latrell Sprewell (6)	Target Center; 15,869	2–1
4	November 3	@ Utah	L 88–93	Sam Cassell (27)	Michael Olowokandi (8)	Sam Cassell (10)	Delta Center; 17,177	2–2
5	November 5	Sacramento	L 121–125 (OT)	Kevin Garnett (28)	Kevin Garnett (11)	Sam Cassell (14)	Target Center; 15,889	2–3
6	November 7	@ Orlando	W 100–71	Latrell Sprewell (22)	Kevin Garnett (17)	Sam Cassell (9)	TD Waterhouse Centre; 16,074	3–3
7	November 8	@ Miami	W 88–79	Kevin Garnett (25)	Kevin Garnett (17)	Sam Cassell (6)	American Airlines Arena; 14,645	4–3
8	November 11	Seattle	L 87–89	Kevin Garnett (26)	Kevin Garnett (13)	Sam Cassell (13)	Target Center; 14,107	4–4
9	November 13	@ Chicago	W 92–89 (OT)	Latrell Sprewell (27)	Kevin Garnett (17)	Sam Cassell (5)	United Center; 21,722	5–4
10	November 14	Utah	L 77–85	Kevin Garnett (23)	Kevin Garnett (14)	Garnett, McLeod (7)	Target Center; 17,182	5–5
11	November 18	Denver	W 89–76	Kevin Garnett (26)	Kevin Garnett (11)	Garnett, McLeod (8)	Target Center; 15,090	6–5
12	November 21	@ Cleveland	W 97–83	Latrell Sprewell (31)	Kevin Garnett (15)	Sam Cassell (6)	Gund Arena; 19,269	7–5
13	November 22	L.A. Clippers	W 103–91	Kevin Garnett (30)	Kevin Garnett (19)	Sam Cassell (8)	Target Center; 16,080	8–5
14	November 25	@ Indiana	L 75–98	Garnett, Cassell (25)	Kevin Garnett (16)	Sam Cassell (6)	Conseco Fieldhouse; 14,540	8–6
15	November 26	New York	L 92–97	Kevin Garnett (25)	Kevin Garnett (14)	Sam Cassell (10)	Target Center; 15,901	8–7
16	November 28	@ Memphis	W 102–98	Sam Cassell (25)	Kevin Garnett (18)	Kevin Garnett (7)	Pyramid Arena; 16,741	9–7
17	November 29	@ Dallas	L 88–92	Kevin Garnett (28)	Kevin Garnett (20)	Sam Cassell (7)	American Airlines Center; 20,089	9–8

December: 11–2 (home: 4–1; road: 7–1)

Game	Date	Team	Score	High points	High rebounds	High assists	Location Attendance	Record
18	December 3	@ Phoenix	W 92–79	Sam Cassell (27)	Kevin Garnett (12)	Sam Cassell (8)	America West Arena; 16,508	10–8
19	December 5	@ Sacramento	W 112–109 (OT)	Latrell Sprewell (37)	Kevin Garnett (25)	Kevin Garnett (6)	ARCO Arena; 17,317	11–8
20	December 7	@ L.A. Clippers	W 96–94	Latrell Sprewell (27)	Kevin Garnett (8)	Sam Cassell (10)	Staples Center; 14,370	12–8
21	December 9	Golden State	L 95–98	Kevin Garnett (33)	Kevin Garnett (14)	Sam Cassell (12)	Target Center; 14,195	12–9
22	December 12	@ Washington	W 110–91	Sam Cassell (25)	Kevin Garnett (16)	Sprewell, Cassell (7)	MCI Center; 16,802	13–9
23	December 15	@ Boston	W 116–95	Garnett, Cassell (27)	Kevin Garnett (12)	Sam Cassell (9)	FleetCenter; 17,234	14–9
24	December 16	Houston	W 92–75	Sam Cassell (25)	Kevin Garnett (13)	Cassell, Garnett (6)	Target Center; 15,715	15–9
25	December 18	Dallas	W 114–109	Kevin Garnett (35)	Gary Trent (12)	Kevin Garnett (10)	Target Center; 17,794	16–9
26	December 20	Indiana	W 102–80	Kevin Garnett (28)	Kevin Garnett (9)	Sam Cassell (10)	Target Center; 16,624	17–9
27	December 23	@ New York	W 98–92	Sprewell, Cassell (31)	Kevin Garnett (13)	Sam Cassell (5)	Madison Square Garden; 19,763	18–9
28	December 26	@ Portland	L 92–101	Kevin Garnett (27)	Kevin Garnett (10)	Garnett, Cassell (9)	Rose Garden Arena; 17,237	18–10
29	December 27	@ Seattle	W 104–86	Kevin Garnett (28)	Kevin Garnett (14)	Sam Cassell (8)	KeyArena; 17,072	19–10
30	December 30	Chicago	W 98–93	Kevin Garnett (28)	Kevin Garnett (15)	Sam Cassell (9)	Target Center; 20,092	20–10

January: 12–3 (home: 7–0; road: 5–3)

Game	Date	Team	Score	High points	High rebounds	High assists	Location Attendance	Record
31	January 2	Atlanta	W 93–75	Kevin Garnett (18)	Kevin Garnett (15)	Sam Cassell (11)	Target Center; 17,074	21–10
32	January 3	@ Dallas	L 112–119	Sam Cassell (34)	Kevin Garnett (22)	Kevin Garnett (7)	American Airlines Center; 19,936	21–11
33	January 6	L.A. Lakers	W 106–90	Latrell Sprewell (30)	Kevin Garnett (18)	Hassell, Cassell (7)	Target Center; 20,095	22–11
34	January 8	Portland	W 96–75	Kevin Garnett (26)	Kevin Garnett (14)	Sam Cassell (11)	Target Center; 15,599	23–11
35	January 10	Miami	W 83–77	Kevin Garnett (28)	Kevin Garnett (17)	Kevin Garnett (6)	Target Center; 17,026	24–11
36	January 13	@ New Orleans	W 94–89	Latrell Sprewell (26)	Kevin Garnett (14)	Sam Cassell (6)	New Orleans Arena; 14,701	25–11
37	January 14	@ San Antonio	W 100–93	Sam Cassell (33)	Kevin Garnett (10)	Sam Cassell (9)	SBC Center; 17,411	26–11
38	January 17	@ Houston	L 76–95	Sam Cassell (25)	Kevin Garnett (7)	Kevin Garnett (6)	Toyota Center; 18,145	26–12
39	January 19	New Orleans	W 97–90	Kevin Garnett (29)	Kevin Garnett (15)	Kevin Garnett (7)	Target Center; 17,117	27–12
40	January 21	@ Toronto	W 108–97	Sam Cassell (30)	Kevin Garnett (11)	Sam Cassell (13)	Air Canada Centre; 18,846	28–12
41	January 23	Detroit	W 80–79	Kevin Garnett (22)	Kevin Garnett (17)	Sam Cassell (8)	Target Center; 19,006	29–12
42	January 25	Phoenix	W 99–95	Sam Cassell (32)	Kevin Garnett (17)	Kevin Garnett (8)	Target Center; 16,002	30–12
43	January 26	@ Denver	W 97–95	Kevin Garnett (31)	Kevin Garnett (13)	Sam Cassell (11)	Pepsi Center; 15,320	31–12
44	January 28	@ Golden State	L 90–97	Latrell Sprewell (27)	Kevin Garnett (20)	Kevin Garnett (10)	The Arena in Oakland; 18,112	31–13
45	January 30	@ L.A. Lakers	W 97–84	Latrell Sprewell (35)	Kevin Garnett (11)	Sam Cassell (11)	Staples Center; 18,997	32–13

February: 11–4 (home: 8–2; road: 3–2)

Game	Date	Team	Score	High points	High rebounds	High assists	Location Attendance	Record
46	February 1	Philadelphia	W 106–101	Kevin Garnett (32)	Kevin Garnett (13)	Cassell, Garnett (9)	Target Center; 16,987	33–13
47	February 3	Orlando	W 113–100	Kevin Garnett (30)	Kevin Garnett (14)	Sam Cassell (10)	Target Center; 14,979	34–13
48	February 4	@ Atlanta	L 89–97	Sam Cassell (20)	Kevin Garnett (12)	Sam Cassell (7)	Philips Arena; 16,073	34–14
49	February 6	Cleveland	W 103–92	Kevin Garnett (35)	Kevin Garnett (12)	Sam Cassell (11)	Target Center; 19,212	35–14
50	February 8	Memphis	L 98–99	Sam Cassell (34)	Kevin Garnett (16)	Sam Cassell (11)	Target Center; 19,179	35–15
51	February 10	L.A. Clippers	W 96–84	Kevin Garnett (31)	Kevin Garnett (16)	Sam Cassell (12)	Target Center; 15,298	36–15
52	February 11	@ Utah	W 77–66	Sam Cassell (24)	Kevin Garnett (12)	Sam Cassell (7)	Delta Center; 19,911	37–15
All-Star Break
53	February 17	Phoenix	W 110–95	Kevin Garnett (32)	Kevin Garnett (14)	Sam Cassell (10)	Target Center; 16,181	38–15
54	February 19	Sacramento	W 92–75	Kevin Garnett (22)	Kevin Garnett (24)	Sprewell, Cassell (5)	Target Center; 18,667	39–15
55	February 20	@ Detroit	W 88–87	Kevin Garnett (25)	Kevin Garnett (13)	Sam Cassell (6)	The Palace of Auburn Hills; 22,076	40–15
56	February 22	San Antonio	L 92–94	Kevin Garnett (28)	Kevin Garnett (10)	Kevin Garnett (7)	Target Center; 20,347	40–16
57	February 24	@ Milwaukee	W 108–102	Sam Cassell (29)	Kevin Garnett (18)	Garnett, Cassell (6)	Bradley Center; 18,717	41–16
58	February 25	New Jersey	W 81–68	Troy Hudson (29)	Michael Olowokandi (11)	Kevin Garnett (6)	Target Center; 17,232	42–16
59	February 27	Golden State	W 91–81	Kevin Garnett (24)	Fred Hoiberg (11)	Kevin Garnett (9)	Target Center; 19,012	43–16
60	February 29	@ Philadelphia	L 74–81	Kevin Garnett (27)	Kevin Garnett (13)	Kevin Garnett (5)	Wachovia Center; 20,453	43–17

March: 9–7 (home: 5–3; road: 4–4)

Game	Date	Team	Score	High points	High rebounds	High assists	Location Attendance	Record
61	March 3	Dallas	W 121–97	Kevin Garnett (28)	Kevin Garnett (19)	Sam Cassell (10)	Target Center; 19,006	44–17
62	March 5	Houston	L 109–112	Kevin Garnett (32)	Kevin Garnett (18)	Sam Cassell (13)	Target Center; 20,109	44–18
63	March 7	Boston	L 77–80	Kevin Garnett (20)	Garnett, Olowokandi (14)	Kevin Garnett (6)	Target Center; 17,661	44–19
64	March 9	@ Seattle	W 105–92	Latrell Sprewell (31)	Garnett, Olowokandi (10)	Sam Cassell (6)	KeyArena; 17,072	45–19
65	March 10	@ Portland	L 79–92	Kevin Garnett (20)	Sam Cassell (8)	Sam Cassell (9)	Rose Garden Arena; 15,456	45–20
66	March 12	L.A. Lakers	W 96–86	Kevin Garnett (20)	Kevin Garnett (13)	Sam Cassell (7)	Target Center; 20,391	46–20
67	March 14	Portland	L 83–92	Garnett, Cassell (20)	Kevin Garnett (14)	Sam Cassell (8)	Target Center; 18,787	46–21
68	March 18	@ San Antonio	L 86–106	Kevin Garnett (28)	Kevin Garnett (12)	Kevin Garnett (3)	SBC Center; 18,797	46–22
69	March 19	@ Phoenix	W 93–80	Wally Szczerbiak (24)	Kevin Garnett (20)	Kevin Garnett (6)	America West Arena; 18,422	47–22
70	March 21	Denver	W 98–77	Kevin Garnett (20)	Kevin Garnett (13)	Kevin Garnett (7)	Target Center; 19,557	48–22
71	March 23	San Antonio	W 86–81	Kevin Garnett (27)	Garnett, Cassell (10)	Sam Cassell (11)	Target Center; 20,111	49–22
72	March 24	@ Denver	L 92–101	Kevin Garnett (24)	Kevin Garnett (14)	Sam Cassell (6)	Pepsi Center; 19,099	49–23
73	March 26	@ L.A. Lakers	L 73–90	Latrell Sprewell (19)	Kevin Garnett (16)	Kevin Garnett (7)	Staples Center; 18,997	49–24
74	March 27	@ L.A. Clippers	W 98–82	Latrell Sprewell (18)	Kevin Garnett (15)	Kevin Garnett (5)	Staples Center; 19,424	50–24
75	March 29	@ Houston	W 94–88	Kevin Garnett (27)	Kevin Garnett (11)	Kevin Garnett (9)	Toyota Center; 16,270	51–24
76	March 31	Seattle	W 90–83	Garnett, Sprewell (27)	Michael Olowokandi (11)	Sam Cassell (9)	Target Center; 19,006	52–24

April: 6–0 (home: 3–0; road: 3–0)

Game	Date	Team	Score	High points	High rebounds	High assists	Location Attendance	Record
77	April 2	Washington	W 91–73	Kevin Garnett (22)	Michael Olowokandi (12)	Sam Cassell (7)	Target Center; 19,159	53–24
78	April 4	Memphis	W 90–82	Sam Cassell (36)	Kevin Garnett (22)	Sam Cassell (8)	Target Center; 19,068	54–24
79	April 8	@ Sacramento	W 94–86	Sam Cassell (29)	Kevin Garnett (17)	Kevin Garnett (5)	ARCO Arena; 17,317	55–24
80	April 9	@ Golden State	W 92–74	Kevin Garnett (29)	Kevin Garnett (15)	Sam Cassell (7)	The Arena in Oakland; 19,753	56–24
81	April 12	Utah	W 104–90	Kevin Garnett (21)	Kevin Garnett (17)	Sam Cassell (6)	Target Center; 18,881	57–24
82	April 14	@ Memphis	W 107–90	Kevin Garnett (26)	Garnett, Olowokandi (9)	Sam Cassell (8)	Pyramid Arena; 19,351	58–24

2003–04 schedule

== Playoffs ==
2004 playoff game log
First round: 4–1 (home: 3–0; road: 1–1)

Game	Date	Team	Score	High points	High rebounds	High assists	Location Attendance	Series
1	April 18	Denver	W 106–92	Sam Cassell (40)	Kevin Garnett (20)	Garnett, Sprewell (4)	Target Center; 18,503	1–0
2	April 21	Denver	W 95–81	Latrell Sprewell (31)	Kevin Garnett (22)	Kevin Garnett (10)	Target Center; 18,101	2–0
3	April 24	@ Denver	L 86–107	Latrell Sprewell (25)	Kevin Garnett (11)	Kevin Garnett (8)	Pepsi Center; 19,713	2–1
4	April 27	@ Denver	W 84–82	Kevin Garnett (27)	Kevin Garnett (14)	Kevin Garnett (5)	Pepsi Center; 19,694	3–1
5	April 30	Denver	W 102–91	Kevin Garnett (28)	Garnett, Madsen (7)	Kevin Garnett (8)	Target Center; 19,890	4–1

Conference Semi-finals: 4–3 (home: 3–1; road: 1–2)

Game	Date	Team	Score	High points	High rebounds	High assists	Location Attendance	Series
1	May 4	Sacramento	L 98–104	Sam Cassell (40)	Kevin Garnett (18)	Kevin Garnett (7)	Target Center; 18,792	0–1
2	May 8	Sacramento	W 94–89	Kevin Garnett (28)	Garnett, Johnson (11)	Sam Cassell (7)	Target Center; 19,599	1–1
3	May 10	@ Sacramento	W 114–113 (OT)	Kevin Garnett (30)	Kevin Garnett (15)	Latrell Sprewell (6)	ARCO Arena; 17,317	2–1
4	May 12	@ Sacramento	L 81–87	Kevin Garnett (19)	Kevin Garnett (21)	Cassell, Garnett (6)	ARCO Arena; 17,317	2–2
5	May 14	Sacramento	W 86–74	Latrell Sprewell (34)	Mark Madsen (13)	Sam Cassell (7)	Target Center; 19,318	3–2
6	May 16	@ Sacramento	L 87–104	Latrell Sprewell (27)	Kevin Garnett (10)	Kevin Garnett (5)	ARCO Arena; 17,317	3–3
7	May 19	Sacramento	W 83–80	Kevin Garnett (32)	Kevin Garnett (21)	Sam Cassell (7)	Target Center; 19,944	4–3

Conference finals: 2–4 (home: 2–1; road: 0–3)

Game	Date	Team	Score	High points	High rebounds	High assists	Location Attendance	Series
1	May 21	L.A. Lakers	L 88–97	Latrell Sprewell (23)	Kevin Garnett (10)	Sam Cassell (8)	Target Center; 19,552	0–1
2	May 23	L.A. Lakers	W 89–71	Kevin Garnett (24)	Kevin Garnett (11)	Latrell Sprewell (8)	Target Center; 19,707	1–1
3	May 25	@ L.A. Lakers	L 89–100	Kevin Garnett (22)	Kevin Garnett (11)	Kevin Garnett (7)	Staples Center; 18,997	1–2
4	May 27	@ L.A. Lakers	L 85–92	Kevin Garnett (28)	Kevin Garnett (13)	Kevin Garnett (9)	Staples Center; 18,997	1–3
5	May 29	L.A. Lakers	W 98–96	Kevin Garnett (30)	Kevin Garnett (19)	Latrell Sprewell (5)	Target Center; 20,109	2–3
6	May 31	@ L.A. Lakers	L 90–96	Latrell Sprewell (27)	Kevin Garnett (17)	Sprewell, Martin (5)	Staples Center; 18,997	2–4

2004 schedule

== Awards and honors ==
=== Week/Month ===
- Kevin Garnett was named Western Conference Player of the Week for games played November 16 through November 22.
- Kevin Garnett was named Western Conference Player of the Week for games played December 14 through December 20.
- Sam Cassell was named Western Conference Player of the Week for games played December 21 through December 27.
- Kevin Garnett was named Western Conference Player of the Week for games played January 18 through January 24.
- Kevin Garnett was named Western Conference Player of the Week for games played January 25 through January 31.
- Kevin Garnett was named Western Conference Player of the Month for December.
- Kevin Garnett was named Western Conference Player of the Month for January.
- Kevin Garnett was named Western Conference Player of the Month for February.
- Kevin Garnett was named Western Conference Player of the Month for April.
- Flip Saunders was named Western Conference Coach of the Month for April.

=== All-Star ===
- Kevin Garnett was voted as a starter for the Western Conference in the All-Star Game. It was his seventh consecutive All-Star selection. Garnett finished first among Western Conference players in voting with 1,780,918 votes.
- Sam Cassell was selected as a reserve for the Western Conference in the All-Star Game. It was his first and only All-Star selection.
- Flip Saunders coached the Western Conference to a 136–132 victory over the Eastern Conference.

=== Season ===
- Kevin Garnett received the Most Valuable Player Award.
- Kevin Garnett was named to the All-NBA First Team. Garnett also finished sixth in Defensive Player of the Year voting.
- Sam Cassell was named to the All-NBA Second Team. Cassell also finished tenth in MVP voting.

== Injuries/Missed games ==
- 10/27/03: Troy Hudson: Sprained ankle; placed on injured list until December 20
- 10/29/03: Wally Szczerbiak: Inflamed arch in foot; placed on injured reserve until February 19
- 11/22/03: Michael Olowokandi: Knee tendinitis; out until November 28
- 11/26/03: Mark Madsen: Back spasms; out until December 9
- 12/05/03: Michael Olowokandi: Knee tendinitis; placed on injured list until February 20
- 12/12/03: Mark Madsen: Back spasms; out until December 20
- 12/20/03: Ervin Johnson: Personal reasons; did not play
- 12/26/03: Troy Hudson: Sprained ankle; out until January 19
- 01/10/04: Gary Trent: Sprained ankle; out until January 19
- 01/23/04: Ervin Johnson: Personal reasons; did not play
- 01/25/04: Ervin Johnson: Personal reasons; did not play
- 02/01/04: Troy Hudson: Sprained ankle; out until February 17
- 02/19/04: Ndudi Ebi: Knee tendinitis; placed on injured list for rest of season
- 02/25/04: Sam Cassell: Ankle tendinitis; did not play
- 02/27/04: Wally Szczerbiak: Flu; did not play
- 03/21/04: Troy Hudson: Sore ankle; did not play
- 03/23/04: Troy Hudson: Sore ankle; did not play
- 03/31/04: Troy Hudson: Sprained ankle; placed on injured list for rest of season
- 04/27/04: Wally Szczerbiak: Cracked vertebrae; out until May 14
- 05/29/04: Sam Cassell: Back spasms; did not play
- 05/31/04: Sam Cassell: Back spasms; did not play

== Player statistics ==
=== Regular season ===
Player	POS	GP	GS	MP	REB	AST	STL	BLK	PTS	MPG	RPG	APG	SPG	BPG	PPG
Kevin Garnett	PF	82	82	3,231	1,139	409	120	178	1,987	39.4	13.9	5.0	1.5	2.2	24.2
Latrell Sprewell	SF	82	82	3,100	310	286	88	21	1,375	37.8	3.8	3.5	1.1	.3	16.8
Sam Cassell	PG	81	81	2,838	271	592	102	18	1,603	35.0	3.3	7.3	1.3	.2	19.8
Trenton Hassell	SG	81	74	2,264	257	133	36	54	406	28.0	3.2	1.6	.4	.7	5.0
Fred Hoiberg	SG	79	3	1,804	268	109	66	10	530	22.8	3.4	1.4	.8	.1	6.7
Mark Madsen	C	72	12	1,246	272	28	33	18	259	17.3	3.8	.4	.5	.3	3.6
Gary Trent	C	68	2	1,025	216	49	12	17	379	15.1	3.2	.7	.2	.3	5.6
Ervin Johnson	C	66	47	965	232	24	27	43	127	14.6	3.5	.4	.4	.7	1.9
Oliver Miller	C	48	1	506	130	36	19	26	121	10.5	2.7	.8	.4	.5	2.5
Michael Olowokandi	C	43	25	925	245	24	16	68	278	21.5	5.7	.6	.4	1.6	6.5
Keith McLeod	PG	33	0	391	34	59	16	1	88	11.8	1.0	1.8	.5	.0	2.7
Troy Hudson	PG	29	1	503	35	70	7	0	218	17.3	1.2	2.4	.2	.0	7.5
Wally Szczerbiak	SF	28	0	622	88	33	12	1	285	22.2	3.1	1.2	.4	.0	10.2
Ndudi Ebi	SF	17	0	32	3	3	0	4	13	1.9	.2	.2	.0	.2	.8
Darrick Martin	PG	16	0	172	7	23	2	1	55	10.8	.4	1.4	.1	.1	3.4
Quincy Lewis	SF	14	0	65	7	2	2	2	16	4.6	.5	.1	.1	.1	1.1
Anthony Goldwire^{†}	PG	5	0	66	6	10	3	0	13	13.2	1.2	2.0	.6	.0	2.6

- ^{†} Denotes player spent time with another team in the season. Stats reflect time with the Timberwolves only.

=== Playoffs ===
Player	POS	GP	GS	MP	REB	AST	STL	BLK	PTS	MPG	RPG	APG	SPG	BPG	PPG
Kevin Garnett	PF	18	18	783	263	92	24	41	438	43.5	14.6	5.1	1.3	2.3	24.3
Latrell Sprewell	SF	18	18	771	79	72	29	12	357	42.8	4.4	4.0	1.6	.7	19.8
Trenton Hassell	SG	18	18	472	44	27	10	7	138	26.2	2.4	1.5	.6	.4	7.7
Ervin Johnson	C	18	16	356	84	13	11	10	48	19.8	4.7	.7	.6	.6	2.7
Fred Hoiberg	SG	18	0	438	66	23	16	0	115	24.3	3.7	1.3	.9	.0	6.4
Mark Madsen	C	17	0	222	58	2	5	4	47	13.1	3.4	.1	.3	.2	2.8
Sam Cassell	PG	16	15	497	40	70	12	3	265	31.1	2.5	4.4	.8	.2	16.6
Darrick Martin	PG	16	3	182	14	23	4	0	50	11.4	.9	1.4	.3	.0	3.1
Michael Olowokandi	C	15	2	224	52	2	2	11	31	14.9	3.5	.1	.1	.7	2.1
Gary Trent	C	13	0	71	12	2	0	0	21	5.5	.9	.2	.0	.0	1.6
Wally Szczerbiak	SF	12	0	298	39	20	6	2	142	24.8	3.3	1.7	.5	.2	11.8
Oliver Miller	C	8	0	31	5	1	0	3	3	3.9	.6	.1	.0	.4	.4

== Transactions ==
=== Trades ===
June 27, 2003
To Milwaukee Bucks----
- (United States) Anthony Peeler
- (United States) Joe Smith
To Minnesota Timberwolves----
- (United States) Sam Cassell
- (United States) Ervin Johnson
July 23, 2003
To Philadelphia 76ers----
- (United States) Marc Jackson
- (United States) Glenn Robinson
- 2006 second-round draft pick ( (United States) Daniel Gibson)
To Atlanta Hawks----
- (United States) Terrell Brandon
- (United States) Randy Holcomb
- 2007 protected first-round draft pick
To New York Knicks----
- (United States) Keith Van Horn
To Minnesota Timberwolves----
- (United States) Latrell Sprewell

=== Free agents ===
==== Additions ====
Date	Player	Contract	Former Team
July 16, 2003	Michael Olowokandi	Signed 3-year contract for $16.2 million	Los Angeles Clippers
July 28, 2003	Fred Hoiberg	Signed 1-year contract for $938,679	Chicago Bulls
July 28, 2003	Mark Madsen	Signed 2-year contract for $1.4 million	Los Angeles Lakers
September 30, 2003	Quincy Lewis	Undisclosed	Maccabi Tel Aviv (Israel)
September 30, 2003	Keith McLeod	Undisclosed	Basket Livorno (Italy)
October 25, 2003	Keith McLeod	Undisclosed	Minnesota Timberwolves
October 29, 2003	Trenton Hassell	Signed 1-year contract for $638,679	Chicago Bulls
December 13, 2003	Oliver Miller	Signed 1-year contract for $686,838	Fujian Xunxing (China)
January 7, 2004	Anthony Goldwire	Signed two 10-day contracts	Yakima Sun Kings (CBA)
January 30, 2004	Darrick Martin	Signed two 10-day contracts	Harlem Globetrotters
March 31, 2004	Darrick Martin	Signed for rest of season	Minnesota Timberwolves

==== Subtractions ====
Date	Player	Reason Left	New Team
May 7, 2003	Igor Rakočević	Waived	Red Star Belgrade (Serbia)
October 21, 2003	Keith McLeod	Waived	Minnesota Timberwolves
December 20, 2003	Quincy Lewis	Waived	Lucentum Alicante (Spain)
January 7, 2004	Keith McLeod	Waived	Yakima Sun Kings (CBA)
January 26, 2004	Anthony Goldwire	Waived	Aris (Greece)
February 20, 2004	Darrick Martin	10-day contract expired	Minnesota Timberwolves
