= 2003–04 Seattle SuperSonics season =

NBA professional basketball team season

- Head coach: Nate McMillan
- General manager: Rick Sund
- Owner: Howard Schultz
- Arena: KeyArena

Results
- Record: 37–45 (.451)
- Place: Division: 5th (Pacific); Conference: 12th (Western)
- Playoff finish: Did not qualify
- Stats at Basketball Reference

Local media
- Television: KING-TV; KONG; Fox Sports Net Northwest
- Radio: KJR

The 2003–04 Seattle SuperSonics season was the SuperSonics' 37th season in the National Basketball Association. During the offseason, the Sonics signed free agent Antonio Daniels. The Sonics started the season in Tokyo, Japan with a two-game series against the Los Angeles Clippers. The Sonics got off to a 5–1 start, but played around .500 for the first half of the season. Ray Allen played his first full season as a member of the Sonics after being acquired from the Milwaukee Bucks in a trade last February. Despite missing the first 25 games due to an ankle injury, he was voted to play in the 2004 NBA All-Star Game. This was Allen's fourth overall All-Star Game appearance and his first as a member of the Sonics. However, despite a 7-game winning streak in March, the Sonics lost seven of their final ten games ending the season fifth in the Pacific Division with a 37–45 record tied with the Golden State Warriors, missing the playoffs. Following the season, Brent Barry signed as a free agent with the San Antonio Spurs.

This was also the Sonics' final season playing in the Pacific Division, as they moved to the new Northwest Division of the Western Conference next season.

== Offseason ==
=== Draft picks ===
Round	Pick	Player	Position	Nationality	College
1	12	Nick Collison	PF/C	United States	Kansas
1	14	Luke Ridnour	PG	United States	Oregon
2	41	Willie Green	SG	United States	Detroit Mercy

== Roster ==
2003–04 Seattle SuperSonics roster
Players

Pos.	No.	Player	Height	Weight	DOB	From
SG	34	Ray Allen	6 ft 5 in (1.96 m)	205 lb (93 kg)	1975-07-20	Connecticut
SG	31	Brent Barry	6 ft 6 in (1.98 m)	185 lb (84 kg)	1971-12-31	Oregon State
C	52	Calvin Booth	6 ft 11 in (2.11 m)	250 lb (113 kg)	1976-05-07	Penn State
PG	33	Antonio Daniels	6 ft 4 in (1.93 m)	195 lb (88 kg)	1975-03-19	Bowling Green
PF	30	Reggie Evans	6 ft 8 in (2.03 m)	245 lb (111 kg)	1980-05-18	Iowa
SF	24	Richie Frahm	6 ft 5 in (1.96 m)	210 lb (95 kg)	1977-08-14	Gonzaga
C	13	Jerome James	7 ft 1 in (2.16 m)	285 lb (129 kg)	1975-11-17	Florida A&M
SF	7	Rashard Lewis	6 ft 10 in (2.08 m)	235 lb (107 kg)	1979-08-08	Alief Elsik (HS)
PG	22	Flip Murray	6 ft 3 in (1.91 m)	200 lb (91 kg)	1979-07-29	Shaw
C	9	Vitaly Potapenko	6 ft 10 in (2.08 m)	280 lb (127 kg)	1975-03-21	Wright State
PF	77	Vladimir Radmanović	6 ft 10 in (2.08 m)	235 lb (107 kg)	1980-11-19	Serbia and Montenegro
PG	8	Luke Ridnour	6 ft 2 in (1.88 m)	175 lb (79 kg)	1981-02-13	Oregon
SF	5	Ansu Sesay	6 ft 9 in (2.06 m)	225 lb (102 kg)	1976-07-29	Mississippi
C	35	Leon Smith	6 ft 10 in (2.08 m)	235 lb (107 kg)	1980-11-02	Martin Luther King (HS)

Coaches
Head coach
- Nate McMillan
Assistant(s)
- Dwane Casey
- Dwight Daub
- Dean Demopoulos
- Bob Weiss

Legend
- (DP) Unsigned draft pick
- (FA) Free agent
- (S) Suspended
- Injured

Roster
Updated: April 7, 2004

== Regular season ==
=== Season standings ===
Pacific Division	W	L	PCT	GB	Home	Road	Div
y-Los Angeles Lakers	56	26	.683	–	34–7	22–19	15–9
x-Sacramento Kings	55	27	.671	1	34–7	21–20	16–8
e-Portland Trail Blazers	41	41	.500	15	25–16	16–25	13–11
e-Seattle SuperSonics	37	45	.451	19	21–20	16–25	11–13
e-Golden State Warriors	37	45	.451	19	27–14	10–31	12–12
e-Phoenix Suns	29	53	.354	27	18–23	11–30	9–15
e-Los Angeles Clippers	28	54	.341	28	18–23	10–31	8–16

#	Western Conference				
#	Team	W	L	PCT	GB
1	c-Minnesota Timberwolves	58	24	.707	–
2	y-Los Angeles Lakers	56	26	.683	2
3	x-San Antonio Spurs	57	25	.695	1
4	x-Sacramento Kings	55	27	.671	3
5	x-Dallas Mavericks	52	30	.634	6
6	x-Memphis Grizzlies	50	32	.610	8
7	x-Houston Rockets	45	37	.549	13
8	x-Denver Nuggets	43	39	.524	15
9	e-Utah Jazz	42	40	.512	16
10	e-Portland Trail Blazers	41	41	.500	17
11	e-Seattle SuperSonics	37	45	.451	21
12	e-Golden State Warriors	37	45	.451	21
13	e-Phoenix Suns	29	53	.354	29
14	e-Los Angeles Clippers	28	54	.341	30

z - clinched division title
y - clinched division title
x - clinched playoff spot

== Player statistics ==
Legend
GP	Games played	GS	Games started	MPG	Minutes per game
FG%	Field-goal percentage	3P%	3-point field-goal percentage	FT%	Free-throw percentage
RPG	Rebounds per game	APG	Assists per game	SPG	Steals per game
BPG	Blocks per game	PPG	Points per game

Player	GP	GS	MPG	FG%	3P%	FT%	RPG	APG	SPG	BPG	PPG
Ronald Murray	82	18	24.6	.425	.293	.715	2.5	2.5	1.0	.3	12.4
Rashard Lewis	80	80	36.6	.435	.376	.763	6.5	2.2	1.2	.7	17.8
Vladimir Radmanović	77	38	30.1	.425	.371	.748	5.3	1.8	1.0	.5	12.0
Reggie Evans	75	27	17.1	.406	.000	.561	5.4	.4	.7	.1	2.9
Calvin Booth	71	35	17.0	.466	.000	.798	3.9	.4	.2	1.4	4.9
Antonio Daniels	71	32	21.3	.470	.362	.842	2.0	4.2	.6	.1	8.0
Luke Ridnour	69	6	16.1	.414	.338	.823	1.6	2.4	.8	.1	5.5
Vitaly Potapenko	65	39	21.8	.489		.641	4.4	.8	.3	.4	7.1
Jerome James	65	24	15.2	.498		.660	3.5	.5	.3	.9	5.0
Brent Barry	59	53	30.6	.504	.452	.827	3.5	5.8	1.4	.3	10.8
Ansu Sesay	57	2	10.2	.455	.286	.696	1.6	.3	.3	.4	3.5
Ray Allen	56	56	38.4	.440	.392	.904	5.1	4.8	1.3	.2	23.0
Richie Frahm	54	0	8.7	.453	.370	.885	1.0	.4	.3	.1	3.4
Leon Smith	1	0	4.0	.500			2.0	.0	.0	.0	2.0

== See also ==
- 2003-04 NBA season
