= 2003–04 Portland Trail Blazers season =

34th basketball season for Portland Trail Blazers

- Head coach: Maurice Cheeks
- General manager: John Nash
- Owner: Paul Allen
- Arena: Rose Garden Arena

Results
- Record: 41–41 (.500)
- Place: Division: 3rd (Pacific); Conference: 10th (Western)
- Playoff finish: Did not qualify
- Stats at Basketball Reference

Local media
- Television: KGW; Fox Sports Net Northwest
- Radio: KEX

The 2003–04 Portland Trail Blazers season was the 34th season for the Portland Trail Blazers in the National Basketball Association. After years of off the court troubles and playoff underachieving, the Blazers under new general manager John Nash, decided to rebuild. Throughout the season, the Blazers dealt away talented but troubled stars like trading Bonzi Wells, after losing his co-captain title, to the Memphis Grizzlies in November, and trading Rasheed Wallace to the Atlanta Hawks for Shareef Abdur-Rahim and Theo Ratliff in February. However, after appearing in only one game with the Hawks, Sheed was again traded to the Detroit Pistons for the rest of the season. The Pistons would eventually win the NBA Finals of that year, giving Wallace his first championship. The team also sent Jeff McInnis to the Cleveland Cavaliers for Darius Miles.

Taking up the slack was Zach Randolph, who led the team in scoring and rebounding, and was named Most Improved Player of The Year. However, the Blazers finished third in the Pacific Division with a 41–41 record, missing the playoffs for the first time since the 1981–82 season, a 21-year streak that was second-longest in NBA history. Following the season, Dale Davis was traded to the Golden State Warriors.

For the season, they slightly once again changed their primary logo they remained only lasted just one season.

== Draft picks ==
Round	Pick	Player	Position	Nationality	College / Club Team
1	23	Travis Outlaw	F	United States	
2	54	Nedžad Sinanović	C	Bosnia and Herzegovina	Brotnjo (Bosnia and Herzegovina)

== Roster ==
Portland Trail Blazers roster
Players

Pos.	No.	Player	Height	Weight	DOB	From
F	33	Shareef Abdur-Rahim	6 ft 9 in (2.06 m)	225 lb (102 kg)	1976-12-11	California
G	1	Derek Anderson	6 ft 5 in (1.96 m)	220 lb (100 kg)	1974-07-18	Kentucky
G	10	Omar Cook (injured)	6 ft 1 in (1.85 m)	190 lb (86 kg)	1982-01-28	St. John's
F/C	34	Dale Davis	6 ft 11 in (2.11 m)	252 lb (114 kg)	1969-03-25	Clemson
G	7	Dan Dickau	6 ft 0 in (1.83 m)	190 lb (86 kg)	1978-09-16	Gonzaga
F	5	Desmond Ferguson	6 ft 7 in (2.01 m)	203 lb (92 kg)	1977-07-22	Detroit Mercy
G	4	Eddie Gill	6 ft 0 in (1.83 m)	190 lb (86 kg)	1978-08-16	Weber State
F	23	Darius Miles	6 ft 9 in (2.06 m)	235 lb (107 kg)	1981-10-09	East St. Louis HS (IL)
F	25	Travis Outlaw	6 ft 9 in (2.06 m)	210 lb (95 kg)	1984-09-18	Starkville HS (MS)
G/F	21	Ruben Patterson	6 ft 5 in (1.96 m)	224 lb (102 kg)	1975-07-31	Cincinnati
F	50	Zach Randolph	6 ft 9 in (2.06 m)	260 lb (118 kg)	1981-07-16	Michigan State
F/C	42	Theo Ratliff	6 ft 10 in (2.08 m)	235 lb (107 kg)	1973-04-17	Wyoming
C	11	Vladimir Stepania (injured)	7 ft 0 in (2.13 m)	236 lb (107 kg)	1976-05-08	Republic of Georgia
G	3	Damon Stoudamire	5 ft 10 in (1.78 m)	171 lb (78 kg)	1973-09-03	Arizona
F	24	Qyntel Woods	6 ft 8 in (2.03 m)	221 lb (100 kg)	1981-02-16	Northeast Mississippi CC

Coaches
Head coach
- Maurice Cheeks
Assistant(s)
- John Loyer
- Jim Lynam
- Dan Panaggio
- Bernard Smith
- Geoff Clark (trainer)

Legend
- (DP) Unsigned draft pick
- (FA) Free agent
- (S) Suspended
- (L) On leave from the team
- Injured

Roster
Updated: March 26, 2004

== Regular season ==
=== Season standings ===
Pacific Division	W	L	PCT	GB	Home	Road	Div
y-Los Angeles Lakers	56	26	.683	–	34–7	22–19	15–9
x-Sacramento Kings	55	27	.671	1	34–7	21–20	16–8
e-Portland Trail Blazers	41	41	.500	15	25–16	16–25	13–11
e-Seattle SuperSonics	37	45	.451	19	21–20	16–25	11–13
e-Golden State Warriors	37	45	.451	19	27–14	10–31	12–12
e-Phoenix Suns	29	53	.354	27	18–23	11–30	9–15
e-Los Angeles Clippers	28	54	.341	28	18–23	10–31	8–16

#	Western Conference				
#	Team	W	L	PCT	GB
1	c-Minnesota Timberwolves	58	24	.707	–
2	y-Los Angeles Lakers	56	26	.683	2
3	x-San Antonio Spurs	57	25	.695	1
4	x-Sacramento Kings	55	27	.671	3
5	x-Dallas Mavericks	52	30	.634	6
6	x-Memphis Grizzlies	50	32	.610	8
7	x-Houston Rockets	45	37	.549	13
8	x-Denver Nuggets	43	39	.524	15
9	e-Utah Jazz	42	40	.512	16
10	e-Portland Trail Blazers	41	41	.500	17
11	e-Seattle SuperSonics	37	45	.451	21
12	e-Golden State Warriors	37	45	.451	21
13	e-Phoenix Suns	29	53	.354	29
14	e-Los Angeles Clippers	28	54	.341	30

z - clinched division title
y - clinched division title
x - clinched playoff spot

== Player statistics ==
Legend
GP	Games played	GS	Games started	MPG	Minutes per game
FG%	Field-goal percentage	3P%	3-point field-goal percentage	FT%	Free-throw percentage
RPG	Rebounds per game	APG	Assists per game	SPG	Steals per game
BPG	Blocks per game	PPG	Points per game

=== Regular season ===
Player	GP	GS	MPG	FG%	3P%	FT%	RPG	APG	SPG	BPG	PPG
Damon Stoudamire	82	82	38.0	.401	.365	.876	3.8	6.1	1.2	.1	13.4
Zach Randolph	81	80	37.9	.485	.200	.761	10.5	2.0	.8	.5	20.1
Dale Davis	76	37	22.1	.473		.613	5.2	.9	.6	.8	4.4
Ruben Patterson	73	1	22.6	.506	.167	.553	3.7	1.9	1.2	.3	6.9
Qyntel Woods	62	8	10.9	.371	.345	.633	2.2	.7	.3	.2	3.6
Derek Anderson	51	46	35.5	.376	.305	.824	3.6	4.5	1.3	.1	13.6
Rasheed Wallace^{†}	45	44	37.2	.442	.341	.742	6.6	2.5	.8	1.6	17.0
Darius Miles^{†}	42	40	28.4	.526	.200	.702	4.6	2.0	1.0	.8	12.6
Vladimir Stepania	42	2	10.8	.417		.611	3.0	.5	.3	.4	2.6
Jeff McInnis^{†}	39	26	32.5	.471	.319	.763	2.4	5.0	.9	.1	11.9
Wesley Person^{†}	33	0	18.8	.476	.474	.760	2.2	1.2	.3	.2	6.5
Theo Ratliff^{†}	32	31	31.8	.540		.629	7.3	.6	.8	4.4	7.3
Shareef Abdur-Rahim^{†}	32	3	22.8	.447	.364	.832	4.5	1.5	.8	.6	10.0
Eddie Gill	22	0	7.1	.417	.375	.850	.8	.7	.4	.0	2.3
Dan Dickau^{†}	20	0	7.6	.327	.350	.875	.5	1.0	.4	.0	2.3
Omar Cook	17	0	8.2	.259	.000		.4	1.4	.6	.0	.8
Bonzi Wells^{†}	13	10	31.1	.389	.125	.778	4.7	2.7	1.5	.2	12.2
Matt Carroll^{†}	13	0	3.7	.455	.333	1.000	.2	.1	.0	.0	1.0
Ruben Boumtje-Boumtje	9	0	2.9	.200		1.000	.1	.1	.0	.1	.4
Travis Outlaw	8	0	2.4	.429		.500	.5	.1	.1	.0	1.0
Tracy Murray	7	0	5.0	.250	.400	.000	.7	.1	.1	.0	1.1
Desmond Ferguson	7	0	4.6	.417	.375	.000	.6	.1	.0	.0	1.9
Kaniel Dickens	3	0	4.0	1.000		.500	.7	.0	.0	.0	2.3
Slavko Vraneš	1	0	3.0	.000			.0	.0	.0	.0	.0

- ^{†} Denotes player spent time with another team in the season. Stats reflect time with the Trail Blazers only.

== Awards and honors ==
- Zach Randolph, NBA Most Improved Player
- Theo Ratliff, NBA All-Defensive Second Team
