= 2003–04 Phoenix Suns season =

NBA team season

- Head coach: Frank Johnson; Mike D'Antoni
- General manager: Bryan Colangelo
- Owner: Jerry Colangelo
- Arena: America West Arena

Results
- Record: 29–53 (.354)
- Place: Division: 6th (Pacific); Conference: 13th (Western)
- Playoff finish: Did not qualify
- Stats at Basketball Reference

Local media
- Television: KUTP; Fox Sports Net Arizona
- Radio: KTAR

The 2003–04 Phoenix Suns season was the 36th for the Phoenix Suns in the National Basketball Association. It was also the last season under longtime associate Jerry Colangelo's ownership, as he later sold the franchise to an ownership group led by Robert Sarver starting the following season. After advancing to the playoffs the previous season, the Suns started off to a disappointing start under head coach Frank Johnson. With the team at 8–13, team management elected to turn to assistant coach Mike D'Antoni to take over for Johnson. Under D'Antoni, the Suns would lose 40 of their next 61 games and miss the playoffs, finishing sixth in the Pacific division with a 29–53 regular season record, the first time since the 1987–88 season the Suns recorded 50 losses or more. The Suns played their home games at America West Arena.

Before the halfway mark of the season, the Suns sent starting point guard Stephon Marbury along with Penny Hardaway to the New York Knicks for Antonio McDyess, and a lack of offense was felt the rest of the season. Marbury, a future All-Star, was replaced with rookie SG Leandro Barbosa, who only averaged eight points per game. The oft-injured Tom Gugliotta was released and signed as a free agent with the Utah Jazz. The Suns found the injury bug, with reigning Rookie of the Year Amar'e Stoudemire missing nearly 30 games (and the Suns his 20 points and nine rebounds per game). Power forward Shawn Marion did not repeat as an All-Star, despite ending the season averaging 19 points and 9.3 rebounds per game and finishing second in the league in steals per game. Joe Johnson had a breakthrough year in his third season NBA season, leading the league in minutes played and providing the Suns nearly 17 points a game.

By trading Marbury, the Suns were without a point guard to lead an improving young core of Stoudemire, Marion, Johnson and Barbosa, all 25 years of age or younger. By shedding the injury-riddled Hardaway and Gugliotta, as well as Marbury, the Suns ended the season with a need for a club leader and money at their disposal. Following the season, McDyess signed as a free agent with the Detroit Pistons.

For the season, they added new orange alternate road uniforms with grey side panels to their jerseys and shorts they remained in used until 2013.

== Offseason ==
=== NBA draft ===
Round	Pick	Player	Position	Nationality	College
1	17	Žarko Čabarkapa	Forward	Serbia and Montenegro	

== Roster ==
2003–04 Phoenix Suns roster
Players

Pos.	No.	Player	Height	Weight	DOB	From
PG	10	Leandro Barbosa	6 ft 3 in (1.91 m)	176 lb (80 kg)	1982-11-28	Brazil
PF	11	Žarko Čabarkapa	6 ft 11 in (2.11 m)	235 lb (107 kg)	1981-05-21	Montenegro
PG	12	Howard Eisley	6 ft 2 in (1.88 m)	177 lb (80 kg)	1972-12-04	Boston College
PF	4	Donnell Harvey	6 ft 8 in (2.03 m)	220 lb (100 kg)	1980-08-26	Florida
SF	23	Casey Jacobsen	6 ft 6 in (1.98 m)	215 lb (98 kg)	1981-03-19	Stanford
SG	2	Joe Johnson	6 ft 8 in (2.03 m)	225 lb (102 kg)	1981-06-29	Arkansas
C	30	Maciej Lampe	6 ft 11 in (2.11 m)	275 lb (125 kg)	1985-02-05	Poland
SF	31	Shawn Marion	6 ft 7 in (2.01 m)	220 lb (100 kg)	1978-05-07	UNLV
PF	14	Antonio McDyess	6 ft 9 in (2.06 m)	220 lb (100 kg)	1974-09-07	Alabama
PF	32	Amar'e Stoudemire	6 ft 10 in (2.08 m)	245 lb (111 kg)	1982-11-16	Cypress Creek HS (FL)
C	43	Jake Voskuhl	6 ft 11 in (2.11 m)	245 lb (111 kg)	1977-11-01	Connecticut
C	55	Jahidi White	6 ft 9 in (2.06 m)	290 lb (132 kg)	1976-02-19	Georgetown

Coaches
Head coach
- Frank Johnson
- Mike D'Antoni
Assistant(s)
- Tim Grgurich
- Marc Iavaroni
- Todd Quinter
- Phil Weber

Legend
- (DP) Unsigned draft pick
- (FA) Free agent
- (S) Suspended
- Injured

Roster
Updated: February 20, 2004

== Regular season ==
Pacific Division	W	L	PCT	GB	Home	Road	Div
y-Los Angeles Lakers	56	26	.683	–	34–7	22–19	15–9
x-Sacramento Kings	55	27	.671	1	34–7	21–20	16–8
e-Portland Trail Blazers	41	41	.500	15	25–16	16–25	13–11
e-Seattle SuperSonics	37	45	.451	19	21–20	16–25	11–13
e-Golden State Warriors	37	45	.451	19	27–14	10–31	12–12
e-Phoenix Suns	29	53	.354	27	18–23	11–30	9–15
e-Los Angeles Clippers	28	54	.341	28	18–23	10–31	8–16

#	Western Conference				
#	Team	W	L	PCT	GB
1	c-Minnesota Timberwolves	58	24	.707	–
2	y-Los Angeles Lakers	56	26	.683	2
3	x-San Antonio Spurs	57	25	.695	1
4	x-Sacramento Kings	55	27	.671	3
5	x-Dallas Mavericks	52	30	.634	6
6	x-Memphis Grizzlies	50	32	.610	8
7	x-Houston Rockets	45	37	.549	13
8	x-Denver Nuggets	43	39	.524	15
9	e-Utah Jazz	42	40	.512	16
10	e-Portland Trail Blazers	41	41	.500	17
11	e-Seattle SuperSonics	37	45	.451	21
12	e-Golden State Warriors	37	45	.451	21
13	e-Phoenix Suns	29	53	.354	29
14	e-Los Angeles Clippers	28	54	.341	30

== Awards and honors ==
=== All-Star ===
- Amar'e Stoudemire was selected to play for the Sophomore team in the Rookie Challenge.

=== Season ===
- Shawn Marion led the league in steals with 167.
- Joe Johnson led the league in minutes played with 3,331.
- Joe Johnson finished ninth in Most Improved Player voting.

== Player statistics ==
Legend
GP	Games played	GS	Games started	MPG	Minutes per game
FG%	Field-goal percentage	3P%	3-point field-goal percentage	FT%	Free-throw percentage
RPG	Rebounds per game	APG	Assists per game	SPG	Steals per game
BPG	Blocks per game	PPG	Points per game

=== Season ===
Player	GP	GS	MPG	FG%	3P%	FT%	RPG	APG	SPG	BPG	PPG
Robert Archibald*	1	0	6.0	.000	.	.500	1.0	1.0	.0	.0	1.0
Leandro Barbosa	70	46	21.4	.447	.395	.770	1.8	2.4	1.3	.1	7.9
Žarko Čabarkapa	49	4	11.6	.411	.188	.660	2.0	0.8	.2	.3	4.1
Howard Eisley*	34	0	21.4	.345	.308	.830	1.9	3.4	.8	.1	7.l
Tom Gugliotta*	30	3	10.1	.313	.000	.750	1.9	0.7	.5	.1	2.3
Penny Hardaway*	34	10	25.8	.443	.400	.857#	2.9	2.9	.8	.2	8.7
Donnell Harvey*	36	7	12.2	.473	.	.795	2.6	0.4	.4	.4	3.9
Casey Jacobsen	78	13	23.4	.417	.417^	.820	2.6	1.3	.6	.1	6.0
Joe Johnson	82	77	40.6	.430	.305	.750	4.7	4.4+	1.1	.3	16.7
Brevin Knight*	3	0	6.3	.333	.	.	1.0	1.3	1.0	.3	0.7
Maciej Lampe	21	0	10.7	.489†	.000	.769	2.4	0.4	.1	.1	4.6
Stephon Marbury*	34	34	41.6+	.432	.314	.795	3.4	8.3+	1.9	.1	20.8+
Shawn Marion	79	79	40.7+	.440	.340	.851#	9.3	2.7	2.1	1.3+	19.0+
Antonio McDyess*	24	14	21.1	.484†	.	.516	5.8	0.7	1.0	.5	5.8
Amar'e Stoudemire	55	53	36.8	.475†	.200	.713	9.0	1.4	1.2	1.6+	20.6+
Cezary Trybański*	4	0	2.5	.000	.	.	0.3	0.0	.0	.3	0.0
Jake Voskuhl	66	43	24.3	.507†	.	.740	5.2	0.9	.6	.4	6.6
Jahidi White*	61	17	14.1	.524†	.	.500	4.3	0.1	.4	.8	4.3
Scott Williams*	16	10	16.7	.525†	1.000^	.692	4.5	0.4	.9	.4	7.3

* - Stats with the Suns.
+ - Minimum 70 games played or 2000 minutes, 400 assists, 100 blocks, 1400 points.
† - Minimum 300 field goals made.
^ - Minimum 55 three-pointers made.
# - Minimum 125 free throws made.

== Transactions ==
=== Trades ===
June 26, 2003	To San Antonio Spurs 2005 first-round draft pick ( (United States) David Lee)	To Phoenix Suns Rights to (Brazil) Leandro Barbosa
September 30, 2003	To Memphis Grizzlies (United States) Bo Outlaw (Georgia (country)) / (Greece) Jake Tsakalidis	To Phoenix Suns (United Kingdom) Robert Archibald (United States) Brevin Knight (Poland) Cezary Trybański
November 5, 2003	To Washington Wizards (United States) Brevin Knight	To Phoenix Suns (United States) Jahidi White
December 23, 2003	To Orlando Magic 2004 second-round draft pick ( (United States) Antonio Burks)	To Phoenix Suns (United States) Donnell Harvey
December 26, 2003	To Orlando Magic (United Kingdom) Robert Archibald	To Phoenix Suns Conditional 2005 second-round draft pick
January 5, 2004	To New York Knicks (United States) Penny Hardaway (United States) Stephon Marbury (Poland) Cezary Trybanski	To Phoenix Suns (United States) Howard Eisley (Poland) Maciej Lampe (United States) Antonio McDyess (United States) Charlie Ward Rights to (Serbia and Montenegro) Miloš Vujanić 2004 first-round draft pick ( (United States) Kirk Snyder) 2010 first-round draft pick ( (United States) Gordon Hayward) Cash considerations
February 19, 2004	To Utah Jazz (United States) Tom Gugliotta 2004 first-round draft pick ( (United States) Kirk Snyder) 2005 second-round draft pick ( (United States) Alex Acker) 2010 first-round draft pick ( (United States) Gordon Hayward) Cash considerations	To Phoenix Suns (United States) Keon Clark (United States) Ben Handlogten

=== Free agents ===
==== Additions ====
Date	Player	Contract	Former Team
July 16, 2003	Scott Williams	Re-signed to 1-year contract for $1.07 million	Phoenix Suns
July 22, 2003	Jake Voskuhl	Re-signed to 3-year contract for $5.1 million	Phoenix Suns
September 23, 2003	Trevor Huffman	Undisclosed	Brandt Hagen (Germany)
September 23, 2003	William Pippen	Undisclosed	
September 26, 2003	Nick Sheppard	Undisclosed	Gary Steelheads (CBA)
September 26, 2003	Ray Weathers	Undisclosed	Shanghai Sharks (China)
October 1, 2003	DerMarr Johnson	Undisclosed	Atlanta Hawks
October 8, 2003	Dejan Koturović	Undisclosed	Virtus Bologna (Italy)

==== Subtractions ====
Date	Player	Reason left	New team
September 29, 2003	Alton Ford	Free agent	Orlando Magic
October 8, 2003	Trevor Huffman	Waived	Stal Ostrów Wielkopolski (Poland)
October 8, 2003	William Pippen	Waived	Tokyo Apache (Japan)
October 16, 2003	DerMarr Johnson	Waived	Long Beach Jam (ABA)
October 23, 2003	Dejan Koturović	Waived	Tau Cerámica (Spain)
October 23, 2003	Nick Sheppard	Waived	Beijing Ducks (China)
October 23, 2003	Ray Weathers	Waived	Dakota Wizards (CBA)
January 6, 2004	Charlie Ward	Waived	San Antonio Spurs
January 28, 2004	Scott Williams	Waived	Dallas Mavericks
February 20, 2004	Ben Handlogten	Waived	Utah Jazz
