= 2003–04 Golden State Warriors season =

NBA professional basketball team season

- Head coach: Eric Musselman
- General manager: Garry St. Jean
- Owner: Chris Cohan
- Arena: The Arena in Oakland

Results
- Record: 37–45 (.451)
- Place: Division: 5th (Pacific); Conference: 12th (Western)
- Playoff finish: Did not qualify
- Stats at Basketball Reference

The 2003–04 Golden State Warriors season was the Warriors' 58th season in the National Basketball Association, and 42nd season in the San Francisco Bay Area. During the offseason, the Warriors acquired Nick Van Exel from the Dallas Mavericks, and Clifford Robinson from the Detroit Pistons while signing free agents Calbert Cheaney and Speedy Claxton. The Warriors began to show they were turning the corner as they got off to a 14–13 start. However, as the New Year began, they went on a 7-game losing streak. Despite a nine-game losing streak between February and March, the Warriors would then win seven straight games. However, they yet again missed the playoffs by finishing fifth in the Pacific Division with a 37–45 record tied with the Seattle SuperSonics. Despite their record, the Warriors were very successful at home posting a 27–14 record at The Arena in Oakland. Following the season, head coach Eric Musselman was fired, Van Exel was traded to the Portland Trail Blazers, and Erick Dampier was traded to the Dallas Mavericks as the Warriors could not re-sign him.

== Draft ==
Round	Pick	Player	Position	Nationality	College
1	11	Mickaël Piétrus	SG	France	(France) Pau-Orthez
2	40	Derrick Zimmerman	PG	United States	Mississippi State

== Roster ==
Golden State Warriors roster
Players

Pos.	No.	Player	Height	Weight	DOB	From
G	9	J. R. Bremer	6 ft 2 in (1.88 m)	205 lb (93 kg)		St. Bonaventure
F	35	Brian Cardinal	6 ft 8 in (2.03 m)	245 lb (111 kg)		Purdue
G/F	40	Calbert Cheaney	6 ft 7 in (2.01 m)	209 lb (95 kg)		Indiana
G	10	Speedy Claxton	5 ft 11 in (1.80 m)	166 lb (75 kg)		Hofstra
C	25	Erick Dampier (injured)	6 ft 11 in (2.11 m)	265 lb (120 kg)		Mississippi State
F	34	Mike Dunleavy Jr.	6 ft 9 in (2.06 m)	230 lb (104 kg)		Duke
C	00	Evan Eschmeyer (injured) (IN)	6 ft 11 in (2.11 m)	255 lb (116 kg)		Northwestern
C	31	Adonal Foyle	6 ft 10 in (2.08 m)	270 lb (122 kg)		Colgate
G	6	Avery Johnson	5 ft 10 in (1.78 m)	175 lb (79 kg)		Southern
F	54	Popeye Jones	6 ft 8 in (2.03 m)	250 lb (113 kg)		Murray State
F/C	1	Troy Murphy	6 ft 11 in (2.11 m)	245 lb (111 kg)		Notre Dame
G	2	Mickaël Piétrus	6 ft 6 in (1.98 m)	215 lb (98 kg)		France
G/F	23	Jason Richardson	6 ft 6 in (1.98 m)	225 lb (102 kg)		Michigan State
F/C	3	Clifford Robinson	6 ft 10 in (2.08 m)	225 lb (102 kg)		Connecticut
G	37	Nick Van Exel (injured)	6 ft 1 in (1.85 m)	170 lb (77 kg)		Cincinnati

Coaches
Head coach
- Eric Musselman (San Diego)
Assistant(s)
- Jim Boylan (Marquette)
- David Fizdale (San Diego)
- Keith Smart (Indiana)
- Tom Sterner (Millersville)

Legend
- (DP) Unsigned draft pick
- (FA) Free agent
- (S) Suspended
- Injured

Roster

=== Roster Notes ===
- Center Evan Eschmeyer missed the entire season due to a knee injury.

== Regular season ==
=== Season standings ===
Pacific Division	W	L	PCT	GB	Home	Road	Div
y-Los Angeles Lakers	56	26	.683	–	34–7	22–19	15–9
x-Sacramento Kings	55	27	.671	1	34–7	21–20	16–8
e-Portland Trail Blazers	41	41	.500	15	25–16	16–25	13–11
e-Seattle SuperSonics	37	45	.451	19	21–20	16–25	11–13
e-Golden State Warriors	37	45	.451	19	27–14	10–31	12–12
e-Phoenix Suns	29	53	.354	27	18–23	11–30	9–15
e-Los Angeles Clippers	28	54	.341	28	18–23	10–31	8–16

#	Western Conference				
#	Team	W	L	PCT	GB
1	c-Minnesota Timberwolves	58	24	.707	–
2	y-Los Angeles Lakers	56	26	.683	2
3	x-San Antonio Spurs	57	25	.695	1
4	x-Sacramento Kings	55	27	.671	3
5	x-Dallas Mavericks	52	30	.634	6
6	x-Memphis Grizzlies	50	32	.610	8
7	x-Houston Rockets	45	37	.549	13
8	x-Denver Nuggets	43	39	.524	15
9	e-Utah Jazz	42	40	.512	16
10	e-Portland Trail Blazers	41	41	.500	17
11	e-Seattle SuperSonics	37	45	.451	21
12	e-Golden State Warriors	37	45	.451	21
13	e-Phoenix Suns	29	53	.354	29
14	e-Los Angeles Clippers	28	54	.341	30

=== Game log ===
2003–04 game log
Total: 37–45 (Home: 27–14; Road: 10–31)
October: 0–1 (home: 0–1; road: 0–0)

Game	Date	Team	Score	High points	High rebounds	High assists	Location Attendance	Record
1	October 29	Dallas	L 87–95 Archived 2015-05-08 at the Wayback Machine	Clifford Robinson (18)	Erick Dampier (17)	Avery Johnson (6)	The Arena in Oakland; 15,816	0–1

November : 8–6 (home: 7–2; road: 1–4)

Game	Date	Team	Score	High points	High rebounds	High assists	Location Attendance	Record
2	November 1	Philadelphia	W 104–90 Archived 2015-05-08 at the Wayback Machine	Mike Dunleavy Jr. (32)	Mike Dunleavy Jr. (11)	Avery Johnson (5)	The Arena in Oakland; 16,594	1–1
3	November 2	@ L.A. Lakers	L 72–87 Archived 2015-05-08 at the Wayback Machine	Clifford Robinson (19)	Erick Dampier (23)	Clifford Robinson (7)	Staples Center; 18,997	1–2
4	November 5	Atlanta	W 90–72 Archived 2015-05-08 at the Wayback Machine	Jason Richardson (16)	Erick Dampier (18)	Nick Van Exel (6)	The Arena in Oakland; 10,453	2–2
5	November 7	Utah	W 95–89 Archived 2015-05-08 at the Wayback Machine	Jason Richardson (21)	Erick Dampier (11)	Nick Van Exel (9)	The Arena in Oakland; 11,642	3–2
6	November 10	Phoenix	L 96–99 Archived 2015-05-08 at the Wayback Machine	Jason Richardson (22)	Mike Dunleavy Jr. (10)	Van Exel, Dunleavy Jr. (6)	The Arena in Oakland; 13,278	3–3
7	November 12	Detroit	W 87–85 Archived 2015-05-08 at the Wayback Machine	Calbert Cheaney (24)	Erick Dampier (14)	Nick Van Exel (9)	The Arena in Oakland; 14,382	4–3
8	November 14	L.A. Clippers	L 98–104 Archived 2015-05-08 at the Wayback Machine	Brian Cardinal (24)	Erick Dampier (16)	Nick Van Exel (10)	The Arena in Oakland; 13,122	4–4
9	November 16	@ Sacramento	L 104–106 Archived 2015-05-08 at the Wayback Machine	Jason Richardson (31)	Erick Dampier (15)	Speedy Claxton (7)	ARCO Arena; 17,317	4–5
10	November 18	@ San Antonio	L 81–94 Archived 2015-05-08 at the Wayback Machine	Erick Dampier (17)	Erick Dampier (11)	Van Exel, Claxton (4)	SBC Center; 17,098	4–6
11	November 19	@ Houston	L 83–85 Archived 2015-05-08 at the Wayback Machine	Clifford Robinson (23)	Erick Dampier (12)	Speedy Claxton (8)	Toyota Center; 10,888	4–7
12	November 21	Miami	W 110–91 Archived 2015-05-08 at the Wayback Machine	Jason Richardson (29)	Mike Dunleavy Jr. (14)	Jason Richardson (6)	The Arena in Oakland; 12,869	5–7
13	November 23	Portland	W 78–72 Archived 2015-05-08 at the Wayback Machine	Jason Richardson (21)	Erick Dampier (17)	Cardinal, Claxton (4)	The Arena in Oakland; 14,332	6–7
14	November 28	@ Phoenix	W 92–83 Archived 2015-05-08 at the Wayback Machine	Jason Richardson (25)	Jason Richardson (13)	Clifford Robinson (5)	The Arena in Oakland; 15,826	7–7
15	November 29	San Antonio	W 91–89 Archived 2015-05-08 at the Wayback Machine	Nick Van Exel (29)	Erick Dampier (16)	4 players tied (2)	The Arena in Oakland; 17,680	8–7

December : 6–9 (home: 3–3; road: 3–6)

Game	Date	Team	Score	High points	High rebounds	High assists	Location Attendance	Record
16	December 3	Denver	L 109–117 Archived 2015-05-08 at the Wayback Machine	Speedy Claxton (21)	Erick Dampier (18)	Nick Van Exel (8)	The Arena in Oakland; 16,147	8–8
17	December 5	@ Denver	L 91–98 Archived 2015-05-08 at the Wayback Machine	Mike Dunleavy Jr. (19)	Erick Dampier (11)	Nick Van Exel (9)	Pepsi Center; 17,512	8–9
18	December 6	New York					The Arena in Oakland	
19	December 9	@ Minnesota					Target Center	
20	December 10	@ Milwaukee					Bradley Center	
21	December 12	New Orleans					The Arena in Oakland	
22	December 16	@ New York					Madison Square Garden	
23	December 17	@ Atlanta					Philips Arena	
24	December 19	@ Orlando					TD Waterhouse Centre	
25	December 21	@ Miami					American Airlines Arena	
26	December 23	L.A. Lakers					The Arena in Oakland	
27	December 26	Sacramento					The Arena in Oakland	
28	December 28	@ Denver					Pepsi Center	
29	December 29	Boston					The Arena in Oakland	
30	December 31	@ New Jersey					Continental Airlines Arena	

2003–04 season schedule

== Player statistics ==
Legend
GP	Games played	GS	Games started	MPG	Minutes per game
FG%	Field-goal percentage	3P%	3-point field-goal percentage	FT%	Free-throw percentage
RPG	Rebounds per game	APG	Assists per game	SPG	Steals per game
BPG	Blocks per game	PPG	Points per game

=== Regular season ===
Player	GP	GS	MPG	FG%	3P%	FT%	RPG	APG	SPG	BPG	PPG
J. R. Bremer	5	0	8.0	.190	.000	.000	.60	2.40	.00	.00	1.6
Brian Cardinal	76	11	21.5	.472	.444	.878	4.20	1.4	.90	.30	9.6
Calbert Cheaney	79	7	26.2	.481	.000	.610	3.30	1.7	.80	.20	7.6
Speedy Claxton	60	29	26.6	.427	.182	.813	2.60	4.5	1.60	.20	10.6
Erick Dampier	74	74	32.5	.535	.000	.654	12.00	.8	.40	1.90	12.3
Mike Dunleavy Jr.	75	69	31.1	.449	.370	.741	5.90	2.9	.90	.20	11.7
Adonal Foyle	44	8	13.0	.454	.000	.543	3.80	.4	.10	1.00	3.1
Avery Johnson	46	1	13.8	.402	.000	.667	.70	2.4	.60	.10	4.6
Popeye Jones	5	0	2.0	.000	.000	.000	.20	.0	.0	.0	0.0
Rusty LaRue	4	0	5.5	.333	1.000	.500	.80	.5	.50	.00	1.0
Sean Lampley	10	0	6.3	.650	.000	.667	1.10	.2	.00	.10	3.4
Dan Langhi	4	0	4.3	.333	.000	1.000	.80	.00	.00	.00	1.5
Troy Murphy	28	0	21.8	.440	.294	.750	6.20	.70	.40	.60	10.0
Cherokee Parks	12	0	5.3	.400	.000	.667	.80	.1	.00	.30	1.0
Mickaël Piétrus	53	22	14.1	.416	.333	.693	2.20	.5	.60	.20	5.3
Jason Richardson	78	78	37.6	.438	.282	.684	6.70	2.9	1.10	.50	18.7
Clifford Robinson	82	82	34.7	.387	.357	.711	3.90	3.3	.80	.90	11.8
Nick Van Exel	39	29	32.2	.390	.307	.707	2.70	5.3	.50	.10	12.6

== Transactions ==
=== Trades ===
August 18, 2003	To Golden State Warriors Nick Van Exel; Avery Johnson; Antoine Rigaudeau; Popeye Jones; Evan Eschmeyer	To Dallas Mavericks Danny Fortson; Antawn Jamison; Chris Mills; Jiří Welsch
August 21, 2003	To Golden State Warriors Clifford Robinson; Pepe Sánchez	To Detroit Pistons Bob Sura

=== Free agents ===
Additions
Player	Date signed	Former team
Speedy Claxton	July 23	San Antonio Spurs
Calbert Cheaney	August 27	Utah Jazz
Brian Cardinal	October 1	Pamesa Valencia (Spain)
Zendon Hamilton	October 1	Yakima Sun Kings (CBA)
Juaquin Hawkins	October 1	Houston Rockets
Tierre Brown	October 20	Cleveland Cavaliers
Dan Langhi	October 31	Phoenix Suns
Cherokee Parks	November 9	Los Angeles Clippers
Dan Langhi	November 13	Golden State Warriors
Sean Lampley	November 14	Dakota Wizards (CBA)
Rusty LaRue (10-day)	March 1	Asheville Altitude (D-League)
J. R. Bremer	March 11	Cleveland Cavaliers

Subtractions
Player	Date signed	New Team
Derrick Zimmerman	October 7	Columbus Riverdragons (D-League)
Juaquin Hawkins	October 14	Long Beach Jam (ABA)
Tierre Brown	October 23	Charleston Lowgators (D-League)
Zendon Hamilton	October 27	Philadelphia 76ers
Pepe Sánchez	October 31	Etosa Alicante (Spain)
Dan Langhi	November 21	Milwaukee Bucks
Sean Lampley	December 14	Makedonikos (Greece)
Cherokee Parks	December 22	U. S. Aubenas (France)
