= 2003–04 NBA season =

58th NBA season

- League: National Basketball Association
- Sport: Basketball
- Duration: October 28, 2003 – April 14, 2004; April 17 – June 1, 2004 (Playoffs); June 6 – 15, 2004 (Finals)
- Teams: 29
- TV partner(s): ABC, TNT, ESPN, NBA TV

Draft
- Top draft pick: LeBron James
- Picked by: Cleveland Cavaliers

Regular season
- Top seed: Indiana Pacers
- Season MVP: Kevin Garnett (Minnesota)
- Top scorer: Tracy McGrady (Orlando)

Playoffs
- Eastern champions: Detroit Pistons
- Eastern runners-up: Indiana Pacers
- Western champions: Los Angeles Lakers
- Western runners-up: Minnesota Timberwolves

Finals
- Champions: Detroit Pistons
- Runners-up: Los Angeles Lakers
- Finals MVP: Chauncey Billups (Detroit)

NBA seasons
- ← 2002–03 2004–05 →

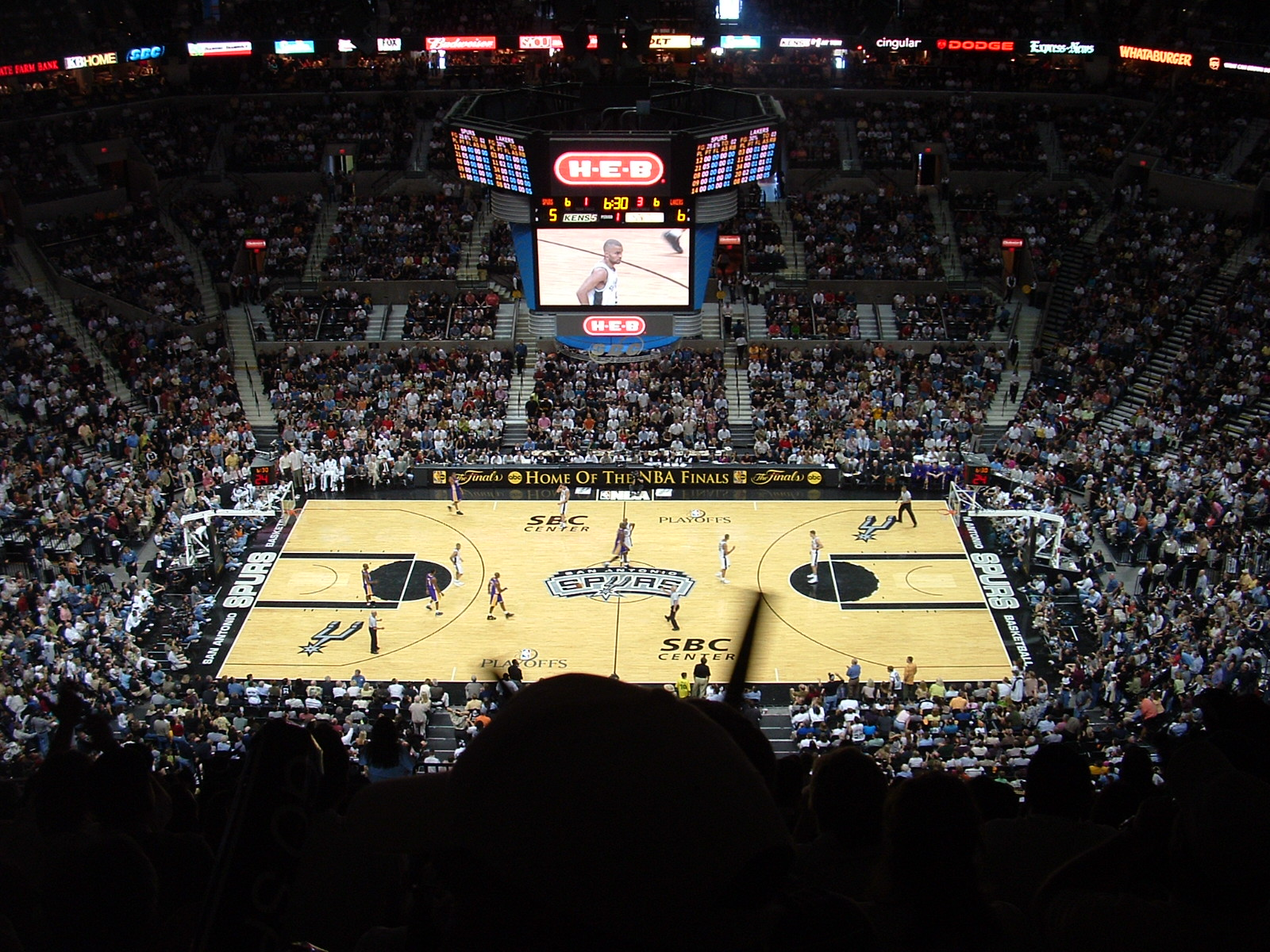
The San Antonio Spurs hosting the Los Angeles Lakers in game 1 of the 2004 Western Conference semifinals at the SBC Center.

The 2003–04 NBA season was the 58th season of the National Basketball Association (NBA). The season ended with the Detroit Pistons defeating the Los Angeles Lakers 4–1 in the 2004 NBA Finals.

The 2003–04 NBA season was the culmination of the "dead-ball" era of the league, in which the NBA saw its lowest offensive rating since the 1998–99 season, at 102.9. The 2004 Eastern Conference Finals between the Pistons and Indiana Pacers saw scoring totals and efficiency hit historic lows, prompting the NBA to swiftly implement rule changes the following offseason in order to make it easier for offenses moving forward.

As of 2026, LeBron James is currently the only active player who played in the 2003–04 season.

== Events ==
This was the last season for the original two-division format in both the Eastern and Western Conferences, before each of the conferences added a third division the following season. As a result, this would also be the final season for the NBA Midwest Division, as the Minnesota Timberwolves were that division's last champion, the only division title the franchise has won in their 29 seasons in the NBA.

The All-Star Game was held at the Staples Center in Los Angeles. The West won 136–132; Lakers center Shaquille O'Neal was named Most Valuable Player.

For the first time in 21 years the Portland Trail Blazers did not make the playoffs, ending the second-longest streak in NBA history. For the first time in 20 years the Utah Jazz did not make the playoffs, ending the third-longest streak in NBA history.

The Houston Rockets played their first game at the Toyota Center. They reached the playoffs for the first time since 1999 and lost to the eventual Western Conference champion Lakers in five games. This marked the only playoff appearance of Steve Francis NBA career.

Prior to the start of the season, Karl Malone and Gary Payton took major paycuts to leave their teams and join Kobe Bryant and Shaquille O'Neal on the Lakers for a chance at a possible NBA title. However, that title chase came to an end in the NBA Finals, as the Detroit Pistons won 4–1. The Minnesota Timberwolves, behind their "Big Three" of Kevin Garnett, Latrell Sprewell, and Sam Cassell, amassed the best record in the Western Conference, and were expected to finally win a first round playoff series. They won two and advanced to the Western Conference Finals, which they lost to the Lakers. It would be their last playoff appearance until the 2017–18 season.

LeBron James (1st overall to Cleveland), Carmelo Anthony (3rd overall to Denver), Chris Bosh (4th overall to Toronto), and Dwyane Wade (5th overall to Miami), among others, formed one of the strongest drafts in NBA history. Among the highly touted rookies, Anthony and Wade led their teams to the playoffs, and Wade's play pushed the Heat into the second round. James went on to win NBA Rookie of the Year. Anthony became the first NBA rookie to lead a playoff team in scoring since David Robinson of the San Antonio Spurs during the 1989–90 season.

The Memphis Grizzlies qualified for the postseason for the first time in the franchise's then 9 year history, dating back to their days in Vancouver. With a record of 50–32, it was also the first time they posted a winning season. It was also their last season played at Pyramid Arena.

Tracy McGrady was the first scoring leader since Bernard King in 1984–85 whose team did not make the playoffs.

General Motors ended its sponsorship deal with the NBA after this season (having rotated among all eight of its U.S. divisions, including Saturn and Hummer), after which Toyota would become the new official partner.

== Coaching ==
Coaching changes
Offseason
Team	2002–03 coach	2003–04 coach
Cleveland Cavaliers	Keith Smart	Paul Silas
Detroit Pistons	Rick Carlisle	Larry Brown
Houston Rockets	Rudy Tomjanovich	Jeff Van Gundy
Indiana Pacers	Isiah Thomas	Rick Carlisle
Los Angeles Clippers	Dennis Johnson	Mike Dunleavy, Sr.
Miami Heat	Pat Riley	Stan Van Gundy
Milwaukee Bucks	George Karl	Terry Porter
New Orleans Hornets	Paul Silas	Tim Floyd
Philadelphia 76ers	Larry Brown	Randy Ayers
Toronto Raptors	Lenny Wilkens	Kevin O'Neill
Washington Wizards	Doug Collins	Eddie Jordan
In-season
Team	Outgoing coach	Incoming coach
Boston Celtics	Jim O'Brien	John Carroll
Chicago Bulls	Bill Cartwright	Pete Myers
Chicago Bulls	Pete Myers	Scott Skiles
New Jersey Nets	Byron Scott	Lawrence Frank
New York Knicks	Don Chaney	Herb Williams
New York Knicks	Herb Williams	Lenny Wilkens
Orlando Magic	Doc Rivers	Johnny Davis
Philadelphia 76ers	Randy Ayers	Chris Ford
Phoenix Suns	Frank Johnson	Mike D'Antoni

== 2003–04 NBA changes ==
- Cleveland Cavaliers – added new logo and new uniforms, brought back the original wine and gold to their color scheme, added dark navy blue trim to their color scheme replacing black, light blue and orange, also added side panels to their jerseys and shorts.
- Denver Nuggets – added new logo and new uniforms, replacing dark navy blue, red and gold with light blue and gold, added side panels to their jerseys and shorts.
- Dallas Mavericks – added new grey road alternate uniforms.
- Houston Rockets – added new logo and new uniforms, replacing dark navy blue, red and grey colors with remained red and grey, and moved into their new arena the Toyota Center.
- Orlando Magic – changed their uniforms and wordmarks on their jerseys.
- Phoenix Suns – added new orange road alternate uniforms with grey side panels to their jerseys and shorts.
- Portland Trail Blazers – slightly once again changed their primary logo.
- Toronto Raptors – added new red road alternate uniforms with black and grey side panels to their jerseys and shorts.

== Standings ==
=== By division ===
Eastern Conference

Atlantic Division	W	L	PCT	GB	Home	Road	Div
y-New Jersey Nets	47	35	.573	–	28–13	19–22	18–7
x-Miami Heat	42	40	.512	5	29–12	13–28	15–10
x-New York Knicks	39	43	.476	8	23–18	16–25	15–7
x-Boston Celtics	36	46	.439	11	19–22	17–24	14–10
e-Philadelphia 76ers	33	49	.402	14	21–20	12–29	10–14
e-Washington Wizards	25	57	.305	22	17–24	8–33	3–21
e-Orlando Magic	21	61	.256	26	11–30	10–31	8–16

Central Division	W	L	PCT	GB	Home	Road	Div
y-Indiana Pacers	61	21	.744	–	34–7	27–14	20–8
x-Detroit Pistons	54	28	.659	7	31–10	23–18	17–11
x-New Orleans Hornets	41	41	.500	20	25–16	16–25	14–14
x-Milwaukee Bucks	41	41	.500	20	27–14	14–27	15–13
e-Cleveland Cavaliers	35	47	.427	26	23–18	12–29	14–14
e-Toronto Raptors	33	49	.402	28	18–23	15–26	11–17
e-Atlanta Hawks	28	54	.341	33	18–23	10–31	10–18
e-Chicago Bulls	23	59	.280	38	14–27	9–32	11–17

Western Conference

Midwest Division	W	L	PCT	GB	Home	Road	Div
y-Minnesota Timberwolves	58	24	.707	–	31–10	27–14	14–10
x-San Antonio Spurs	57	25	.695	1	33–8	24–17	15–9
x-Dallas Mavericks	52	30	.634	6	36–5	16–25	14–10
x-Memphis Grizzlies	50	32	.610	8	31–10	19–22	12–12
x-Houston Rockets	45	37	.549	13	27–14	18–23	8–16
x-Denver Nuggets	43	39	.524	15	29–12	14–27	11–13
e-Utah Jazz	42	40	.512	16	28–13	14–27	10–14

Pacific Division	W	L	PCT	GB	Home	Road	Div
y-Los Angeles Lakers	56	26	.683	–	34–7	22–19	15–9
x-Sacramento Kings	55	27	.671	1	34–7	21–20	16–8
e-Portland Trail Blazers	41	41	.500	15	25–16	16–25	13–11
e-Seattle SuperSonics	37	45	.451	19	21–20	16–25	11–13
e-Golden State Warriors	37	45	.451	19	27–14	10–31	12–12
e-Phoenix Suns	29	53	.354	27	18–23	11–30	9–15
e-Los Angeles Clippers	28	54	.341	28	18–23	10–31	8–16

=== By conference ===
#	Eastern Conference				
#	Team	W	L	PCT	GB
1	z-Indiana Pacers	61	21	.744	–
2	y-New Jersey Nets	47	35	.573	14
3	x-Detroit Pistons	54	28	.659	7
4	x-Miami Heat	42	40	.512	19
5	x-New Orleans Hornets	41	41	.500	20
6	x-Milwaukee Bucks	41	41	.500	20
7	x-New York Knicks	39	43	.476	22
8	x-Boston Celtics	36	46	.439	25
9	e-Cleveland Cavaliers	35	47	.427	26
10	e-Toronto Raptors	33	49	.402	28
11	e-Philadelphia 76ers	33	49	.402	28
12	e-Atlanta Hawks	28	54	.341	33
13	e-Washington Wizards	25	57	.305	36
14	e-Chicago Bulls	23	59	.280	38
15	e-Orlando Magic	21	61	.256	40

#	Western Conference				
#	Team	W	L	PCT	GB
1	c-Minnesota Timberwolves	58	24	.707	–
2	y-Los Angeles Lakers	56	26	.683	2
3	x-San Antonio Spurs	57	25	.695	1
4	x-Sacramento Kings	55	27	.671	3
5	x-Dallas Mavericks	52	30	.634	6
6	x-Memphis Grizzlies	50	32	.610	8
7	x-Houston Rockets	45	37	.549	13
8	x-Denver Nuggets	43	39	.524	15
9	e-Utah Jazz	42	40	.512	16
10	e-Portland Trail Blazers	41	41	.500	17
11	e-Seattle SuperSonics	37	45	.451	21
12	e-Golden State Warriors	37	45	.451	21
13	e-Phoenix Suns	29	53	.354	29
14	e-Los Angeles Clippers	28	54	.341	30

Notes

- z – Clinched home court advantage for the entire playoffs
- c – Clinched home court advantage for the conference playoffs
- y – Clinched division title
- x – Clinched playoff spot
- e – Eliminated from playoff contention

== Playoffs ==
Teams in bold advanced to the next round. The numbers to the left of each team indicate the team's seeding in its conference, and the numbers to the right indicate the number of games the team won in that round. The division champions are marked by an asterisk. Home court advantage does not necessarily belong to the higher-seeded team, but instead the team with the better regular season record; teams enjoying the home advantage are shown in italics.

Conference Quarterfinals	Conference Semifinals
**E1**	**Indiana***	**4**
E8	Boston	0
**E1**	**Indiana***	**4**
E4	Miami	2
**E4**	**Miami**	**4**
E5	New Orleans	3
**Eastern Conference**
**E3**	**Detroit**	**4**
E6	Milwaukee	1
**E3**	**Detroit**	**4**
E2	New Jersey*	3
**E2**	**New Jersey***	**4**
E7	New York	0
**W1**	**Minnesota***	**4**
W8	Denver	1
**W1**	**Minnesota***	**4**
W4	Sacramento	3
**W4**	**Sacramento**	**4**
W5	Dallas	1
**Western Conference**
**W3**	**San Antonio**	**4**
W6	Memphis	0
W3	San Antonio	2
**W2**	**LA Lakers***	**4**
**W2**	**LA Lakers***	**4**
W7	Houston	1

Conference Finals
E1	Indiana*	2
**E3**	**Detroit**	**4**
W1	Minnesota*	2
**W2**	**LA Lakers***	**4**

NBA Finals
**E3**	**Detroit**	**4**
W2	LA Lakers*	1

- * Division winner
- **Bold** Series winner
- Italic Team with home-court advantage

== Statistics leaders ==
Category	Player	Team	Stat
Points per game	Tracy McGrady	Orlando Magic	28.0
Rebounds per game	Kevin Garnett	Minnesota Timberwolves	13.9
Assists per game	Jason Kidd	New Jersey Nets	9.2
Steals per game	Baron Davis	New Orleans Hornets	2.36
Blocks per game	Theo Ratliff	Portland Trail Blazers	3.61
FG%	Shaquille O'Neal	Los Angeles Lakers	.584
FT%	Peja Stojaković	Sacramento Kings	.927
3FG%	Anthony Peeler	Sacramento Kings	.482

== Awards ==
=== Yearly awards ===
- Most Valuable Player: Kevin Garnett, Minnesota Timberwolves
- Rookie of the Year: LeBron James, Cleveland Cavaliers
- Defensive Player of the Year: Ron Artest, Indiana Pacers
- Sixth Man of the Year: Antawn Jamison, Dallas Mavericks
- Most Improved Player: Zach Randolph, Portland Trail Blazers
- Coach of the Year: Hubie Brown, Memphis Grizzlies
- Executive of the Year: Jerry West, Memphis Grizzlies
- Sportsmanship Award: P. J. Brown, New Orleans Hornets
- J. Walter Kennedy Citizenship Award: Reggie Miller, Indiana Pacers

- All-NBA First Team:
  - F – Kevin Garnett, Minnesota Timberwolves
  - F – Tim Duncan, San Antonio Spurs
  - C – Shaquille O'Neal, Los Angeles Lakers
  - G – Kobe Bryant, Los Angeles Lakers
  - G – Jason Kidd, New Jersey Nets
- All-NBA Second Team:
  - F – Peja Stojaković, Sacramento Kings
  - F – Jermaine O'Neal, Indiana Pacers
  - C – Ben Wallace, Detroit Pistons
  - G – Tracy McGrady, Orlando Magic
  - G – Sam Cassell, Minnesota Timberwolves
- All-NBA Third Team
  - F – Ron Artest, Indiana Pacers
  - F – Dirk Nowitzki, Dallas Mavericks
  - C – Yao Ming, Houston Rockets
  - G – Michael Redd, Milwaukee Bucks
  - G – Baron Davis, New Orleans Hornets

- NBA All-Defensive First Team:
  - F – Ron Artest, Indiana Pacers
  - F – Kevin Garnett, Minnesota Timberwolves
  - C – Ben Wallace, Detroit Pistons
  - G – Bruce Bowen, San Antonio Spurs
  - G – Kobe Bryant, Los Angeles Lakers
- NBA All-Defensive Second Team
  - F – Andrei Kirilenko, Utah Jazz
  - F – Tim Duncan, San Antonio Spurs
  - C – Theo Ratliff, Portland Trail Blazers
  - G – Doug Christie, Sacramento Kings
  - G – Jason Kidd, New Jersey Nets

- NBA All-Rookie First Team:
  - LeBron James, Cleveland Cavaliers
  - Carmelo Anthony, Denver Nuggets
  - Dwyane Wade, Miami Heat
  - Chris Bosh, Toronto Raptors
  - Kirk Hinrich, Chicago Bulls
- All-Rookie Second Team:
  - Udonis Haslem, Miami Heat
  - Marquis Daniels, Dallas Mavericks
  - Jarvis Hayes, Washington Wizards
  - Josh Howard, Dallas Mavericks
  - T. J. Ford, Milwaukee Bucks

=== Players of the month ===
The following players were named the Eastern and Western Conference Players of the Month.

Month	Eastern Conference	Western Conference
October – November	Baron Davis (New Orleans Hornets) (1/1)	Peja Stojaković (Sacramento Kings) (1/1)
December	Jermaine O'Neal (Indiana Pacers) (1/1)	Kevin Garnett (Minnesota Timberwolves) (1/4)
January	Michael Redd (Milwaukee Bucks) (1/1)	Kevin Garnett (Minnesota Timberwolves) (2/4)
February	Kenyon Martin (New Jersey Nets) (1/1)	Kevin Garnett (Minnesota Timberwolves) (3/4)
March	Lamar Odom (Miami Heat) (1/1)	Kobe Bryant (Los Angeles Lakers) (1/1)
April	Jamaal Magloire (New Orleans Hornets) (1/1)	Kevin Garnett (Minnesota Timberwolves) (4/4)

=== Rookies of the month ===
The following players were named the Eastern and Western Conference Rookies of the Month.

Month	Eastern Conference	Western Conference
October – November	LeBron James (Cleveland Cavaliers) (1/6)	Carmelo Anthony (Denver Nuggets) (1/6)
December	LeBron James (Cleveland Cavaliers) (2/6)	Carmelo Anthony (Denver Nuggets) (2/6)
January	LeBron James (Cleveland Cavaliers) (3/6)	Carmelo Anthony (Denver Nuggets) (3/6)
February	LeBron James (Cleveland Cavaliers) (4/6)	Carmelo Anthony (Denver Nuggets) (4/6)
March	LeBron James (Cleveland Cavaliers) (5/6)	Carmelo Anthony (Denver Nuggets) (5/6)
April	LeBron James (Cleveland Cavaliers) (6/6)	Carmelo Anthony (Denver Nuggets) (6/6)

=== Coaches of the month ===
The following coaches were named the Eastern and Western Conference Coaches of the Month.

Month	Eastern Conference	Western Conference
October – November	Rick Carlisle (Indiana Pacers) (1/1)	Phil Jackson (Los Angeles Lakers) (1/1)
December	Byron Scott (New Jersey Nets) (1/1)	Gregg Popovich (San Antonio Spurs) (1/1)
January	Larry Brown (Detroit Pistons) (1/2)	Rick Adelman (Sacramento Kings) (1/1)
February	Lawrence Frank (New Jersey Nets) (1/1)	Hubie Brown (Memphis Grizzlies) (1/2)
March	Stan Van Gundy (Miami Heat) (1/1)	Hubie Brown (Memphis Grizzlies) (2/2)
April	Larry Brown (Detroit Pistons) (2/2)	Flip Saunders (Minnesota Timberwolves) (1/1)

== See also ==
- List of NBA regular season records
