= 2003–04 Washington Wizards season =

NBA professional basketball team season

- Head coach: Eddie Jordan
- Arena: MCI Center

Results
- Record: 25–57 (.305)
- Place: Division: 6th (Atlantic); Conference: 13th (Eastern)
- Playoff finish: Did not qualify
- Stats at Basketball Reference

The 2003–04 Washington Wizards season was the Wizards 43rd season in the National Basketball Association, and their 31st season in the city of Washington, D.C. With All-Star guard Michael Jordan retired for good and Doug Collins fired as head coach, the Wizards hired Eddie Jordan, and signed free agent and last year's Most Improved Player Gilbert Arenas during the offseason. Under Jordan, the Wizards showed signs early into the season as they won their first game against the Chicago Bulls 99–74, and held the Toronto Raptors to 60 points in a 26-point margin win, while winning three of their first five games. However, with team captain Jerry Stackhouse playing just 26 games due to knee injuries, the Wizards played mediocre basketball all season finishing sixth in the Atlantic Division with a disappointing 25–57 record, missing the playoffs for the seventh straight season. Following the season, Stackhouse was traded to the Dallas Mavericks, and Christian Laettner signed as a free agent with the Miami Heat. Gilbert Arenas, in his first full season with the Wizards after signing as a restricted free agent, averaged 19.6 points, 5.0 assists and 4.6 rebounds per game in 55 appearances, establishing himself as the team's primary offensive option following Michael Jordan's second retirement. Larry Hughes contributed 18.8 points per game, making the Wizards one of only a handful of teams that season with two players averaging close to 20 points. Kwame Brown, the first overall pick of the 2001 NBA draft and the first high school player ever selected first overall, showed development in his third season by averaging 10.9 points and 7.4 rebounds. Rookie Jarvis Hayes, the 10th overall pick, averaged 9.6 points and was named to the NBA All-Rookie Second Team. Eddie Jordan, in his first season as head coach, installed an uptempo system that would lead the Wizards to three consecutive playoff appearances beginning the following season.

== Draft picks ==
| Round | Pick | Player | Position | Nationality | College |
|---|---|---|---|---|---|
| 1 | 10 | Jarvis Hayes | SF | United States | Georgia |
| 2 | 38 | Steve Blake | PG | United States | Maryland |

== Roster ==
2003-04 Washington Wizards roster
Players

| Pos. | No. | Player | Height | Weight | DOB | From |
|---|---|---|---|---|---|---|
| G | 0 | Gilbert Arenas | 6 ft 4 in (1.93 m) | 215 lb (98 kg) | | Arizona |
| F | 35 | Lonny Baxter | 6 ft 8 in (2.03 m) | 264 lb (120 kg) | | Maryland |
| G | 2 | Steve Blake | 6 ft 3 in (1.91 m) | 172 lb (78 kg) | | Maryland |
| F/C | 5 | Kwame Brown | 6 ft 11 in (2.11 m) | 290 lb (132 kg) | | Glynn Academy (GA) |
| G | 32 | Mitchell Butler | 6 ft 5 in (1.96 m) | 210 lb (95 kg) | | UCLA |
| G | 3 | Juan Dixon | 6 ft 3 in (1.91 m) | 165 lb (75 kg) | | Maryland |
| F | 24 | Jarvis Hayes | 6 ft 8 in (2.03 m) | 220 lb (100 kg) | | Georgia |
| C | 33 | Brendan Haywood | 7 ft 0 in (2.13 m) | 263 lb (119 kg) | | North Carolina |
| G/F | 20 | Larry Hughes | 6 ft 5 in (1.96 m) | 184 lb (83 kg) | | Saint Louis |
| F | 1 | Jared Jeffries | 6 ft 11 in (2.11 m) | 240 lb (109 kg) | | Indiana |
| F/C | 44 | Christian Laettner (injured) | 6 ft 11 in (2.11 m) | 235 lb (107 kg) | | Duke |
| G/F | 42 | Jerry Stackhouse | 6 ft 6 in (1.98 m) | 218 lb (99 kg) | | North Carolina |
| F/C | 36 | Etan Thomas | 6 ft 10 in (2.08 m) | 260 lb (118 kg) | | Syracuse |
| G | 12 | Chris Whitney (injured) | 6 ft 0 in (1.83 m) | 168 lb (76 kg) | | Clemson |

Coaches
Head coach
- Eddie Jordan (Rutgers)

Legend
- (DP) Unsigned draft pick
- (FA) Free agent
- (S) Suspended
- Injured

Roster

== Regular season ==
=== Season standings ===
| Atlantic Division | W | L | PCT | GB | Home | Road | Div |
|---|---|---|---|---|---|---|---|
| y-New Jersey Nets | 47 | 35 | .573 | – | 28–13 | 19–22 | 18–7 |
| x-Miami Heat | 42 | 40 | .512 | 5 | 29–12 | 13–28 | 15–10 |
| x-New York Knicks | 39 | 43 | .476 | 8 | 23–18 | 16–25 | 15–7 |
| x-Boston Celtics | 36 | 46 | .439 | 11 | 19–22 | 17–24 | 14–10 |
| e-Philadelphia 76ers | 33 | 49 | .402 | 14 | 21–20 | 12–29 | 10–14 |
| e-Washington Wizards | 25 | 57 | .305 | 22 | 17–24 | 8–33 | 3–21 |
| e-Orlando Magic | 21 | 61 | .256 | 26 | 11–30 | 10–31 | 8–16 |

| # | Eastern Conference | | | | |
| # | Team | W | L | PCT | GB |
|---|---|---|---|---|---|
| 1 | z-Indiana Pacers | 61 | 21 | .744 | – |
| 2 | y-New Jersey Nets | 47 | 35 | .573 | 14 |
| 3 | x-Detroit Pistons | 54 | 28 | .659 | 7 |
| 4 | x-Miami Heat | 42 | 40 | .512 | 19 |
| 5 | x-New Orleans Hornets | 41 | 41 | .500 | 20 |
| 6 | x-Milwaukee Bucks | 41 | 41 | .500 | 20 |
| 7 | x-New York Knicks | 39 | 43 | .476 | 22 |
| 8 | x-Boston Celtics | 36 | 46 | .439 | 25 |
| 9 | e-Cleveland Cavaliers | 35 | 47 | .427 | 26 |
| 10 | e-Toronto Raptors | 33 | 49 | .402 | 28 |
| 11 | e-Philadelphia 76ers | 33 | 49 | .402 | 28 |
| 12 | e-Atlanta Hawks | 28 | 54 | .341 | 33 |
| 13 | e-Washington Wizards | 25 | 57 | .305 | 36 |
| 14 | e-Chicago Bulls | 23 | 59 | .280 | 38 |
| 15 | e-Orlando Magic | 21 | 61 | .256 | 40 |

Notes

- z, y – division champions
- x – clinched playoff spot

== Player statistics ==
Legend
| GP | Games played | GS | Games started | MPG | Minutes per game |
| FG% | Field-goal percentage | 3P% | 3-point field-goal percentage | FT% | Free-throw percentage |
| RPG | Rebounds per game | APG | Assists per game | SPG | Steals per game |
| BPG | Blocks per game | PPG | Points per game |

=== Regular season ===
| Player | GP | GS | MPG | FG% | 3P% | FT% | RPG | APG | SPG | BPG | PPG |
|---|---|---|---|---|---|---|---|---|---|---|---|
| Gilbert Arenas | 55 | 52 | 37.6 | .392 | .375 | .748 | 4.6 | 5.0 | 1.9 | .2 | 19.6 |
| Lonny Baxter^{†} | 12 | 0 | 11.0 | .500 | .000 | .750 | 2.6 | .4 | .2 | .4 | 3.4 |
| Steve Blake | 75 | 14 | 18.6 | .386 | .371 | .821 | 1.6 | 2.8 | .8 | .1 | 5.9 |
| Torraye Braggs^{†} | 4 | 0 | 5.5 | .600 | | | 1.3 | .3 | .0 | .0 | 1.5 |
| Kwame Brown | 74 | 57 | 30.3 | .489 | .500 | .683 | 7.4 | 1.5 | .9 | .7 | 10.9 |
| Mitchell Butler | 41 | 4 | 13.5 | .435 | .367 | .625 | 1.7 | .8 | .5 | .1 | 3.3 |
| Juan Dixon | 71 | 16 | 20.8 | .388 | .298 | .799 | 2.1 | 1.9 | 1.2 | .1 | 9.4 |
| Jarvis Hayes | 70 | 42 | 29.2 | .400 | .305 | .786 | 3.8 | 1.5 | 1.0 | .2 | 9.6 |
| Brendan Haywood | 77 | 59 | 19.3 | .515 | .000 | .585 | 5.0 | .6 | .4 | 1.3 | 7.0 |
| Larry Hughes | 61 | 61 | 33.8 | .397 | .341 | .797 | 5.3 | 2.4 | 1.6 | .4 | 18.8 |
| Jared Jeffries | 82 | 38 | 23.3 | .377 | .167 | .614 | 5.2 | 1.1 | .6 | .3 | 5.7 |
| Brevin Knight^{†} | 32 | 12 | 18.7 | .420 | .200 | .704 | 1.9 | 3.2 | 1.6 | .0 | 4.3 |
| Christian Laettner | 48 | 18 | 20.5 | .465 | .286 | .800 | 4.8 | 1.9 | .8 | .6 | 5.9 |
| Jerry Stackhouse | 26 | 17 | 29.8 | .399 | .354 | .806 | 3.6 | 4.0 | .9 | .1 | 13.9 |
| Etan Thomas | 79 | 15 | 24.1 | .489 | | .647 | 6.7 | .9 | .5 | 1.6 | 8.9 |
| Jahidi White^{†} | 1 | 0 | 4.0 | .000 | | | .0 | .0 | .0 | 1.0 | .0 |
| Chris Whitney | 16 | 5 | 11.6 | .378 | .444 | 1.000 | .9 | .9 | .4 | .1 | 2.9 |

- ^{†} Denotes player spent time with another team in the season. Stats reflect time with the Wizards only.

== Awards and records ==
- Jarvis Hayes, NBA All-Rookie Team 2nd Team

== See also ==
- 2003-04 NBA season
