= 2004 NBA All-Star Game =

Exhibition basketball game

	1	2	3	4	Total
East	33	31	37	31	132
West	31	27	45	33	136
- Date: February 15, 2004
- Arena: Staples Center
- City: Los Angeles
- MVP: Shaquille O'Neal
- National anthem: Nelly Furtado (CAN); Christina Aguilera (USA)
- Halftime show: Michael McDonald; Beyoncé
- Attendance: 19,662
- Network: TNT; ESPN Radio
- Announcers: Marv Albert, Mike Fratello, and Doug Collins; Kevin Harlan, Steve Kerr, Charles Barkley, Kenny Smith and Magic Johnson (All-Star Saturday Night); Jim Durham and Jack Ramsay

NBA All-Star Game
< 2003	2005 >

The 2004 NBA All-Star Game was an exhibition basketball game which was played on February 15, 2004, at the Staples Center in Los Angeles, home of the Lakers and Clippers. This game was the 53rd edition of the North American National Basketball Association (NBA) All-Star Game and was played during the 2003–04 NBA season. This was also the first & only time in LeBron James's career that he was not selected for the All-Star Game, as he has made 22 straight since (2005–2026). This was the first time that the Staples Center had hosted the All-Star Game, the first time since 1963 that the event was held in the city of Los Angeles, and the fourth time that Greater Los Angeles metropolitan area had hosted the event. Before the Staples Center opened in 1999, the metropolis had previously hosted the game in 1963, 1972, and 1983.

The West defeated the East 136–132, with Shaquille O'Neal of the Los Angeles Lakers winning the Most Valuable Player for the second time in his career. O'Neal scored 24 points and grabbed 11 rebounds. Jamaal Magloire led the East with 19 points and 8 rebounds.

== All-Star Game ==
=== Coaches ===
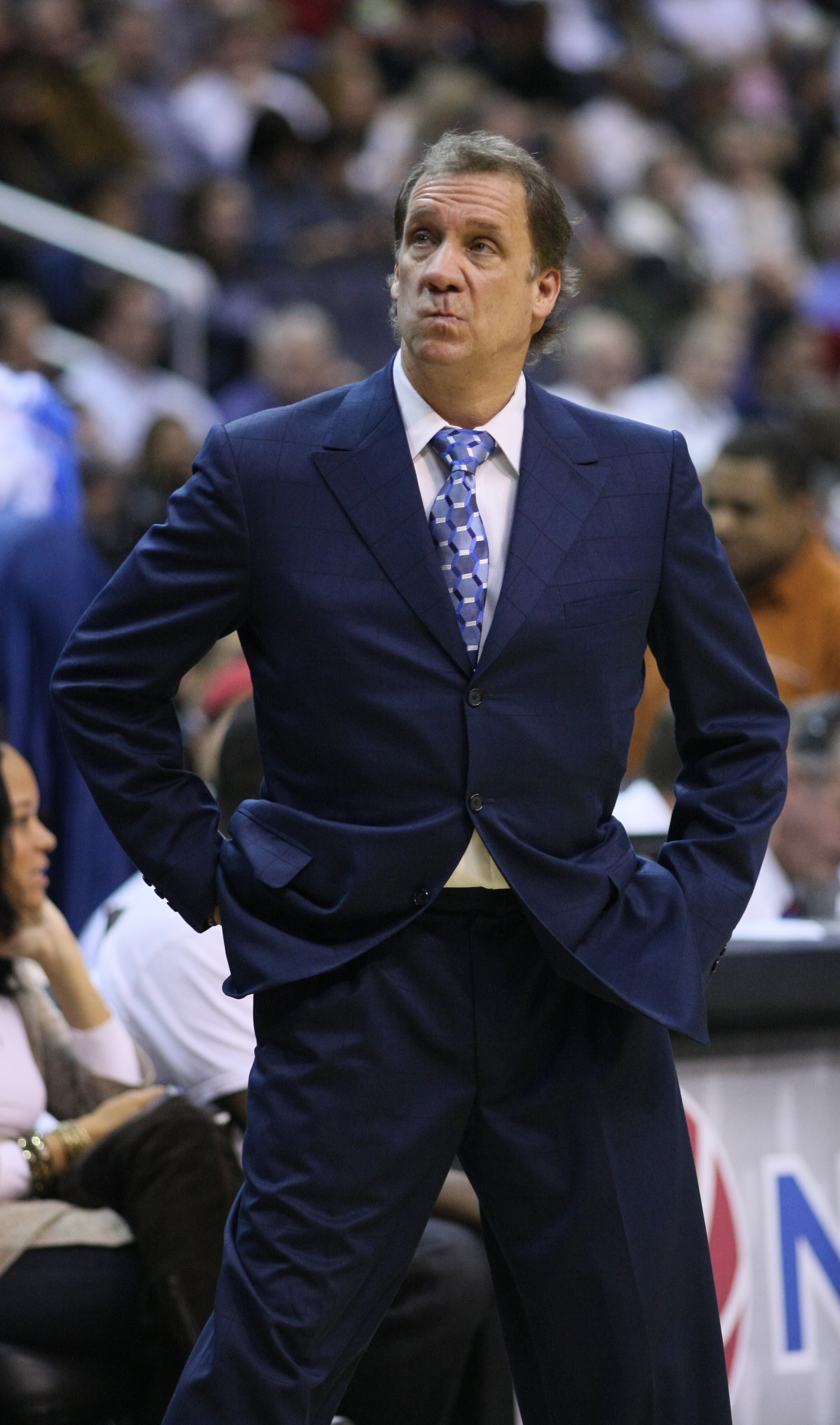
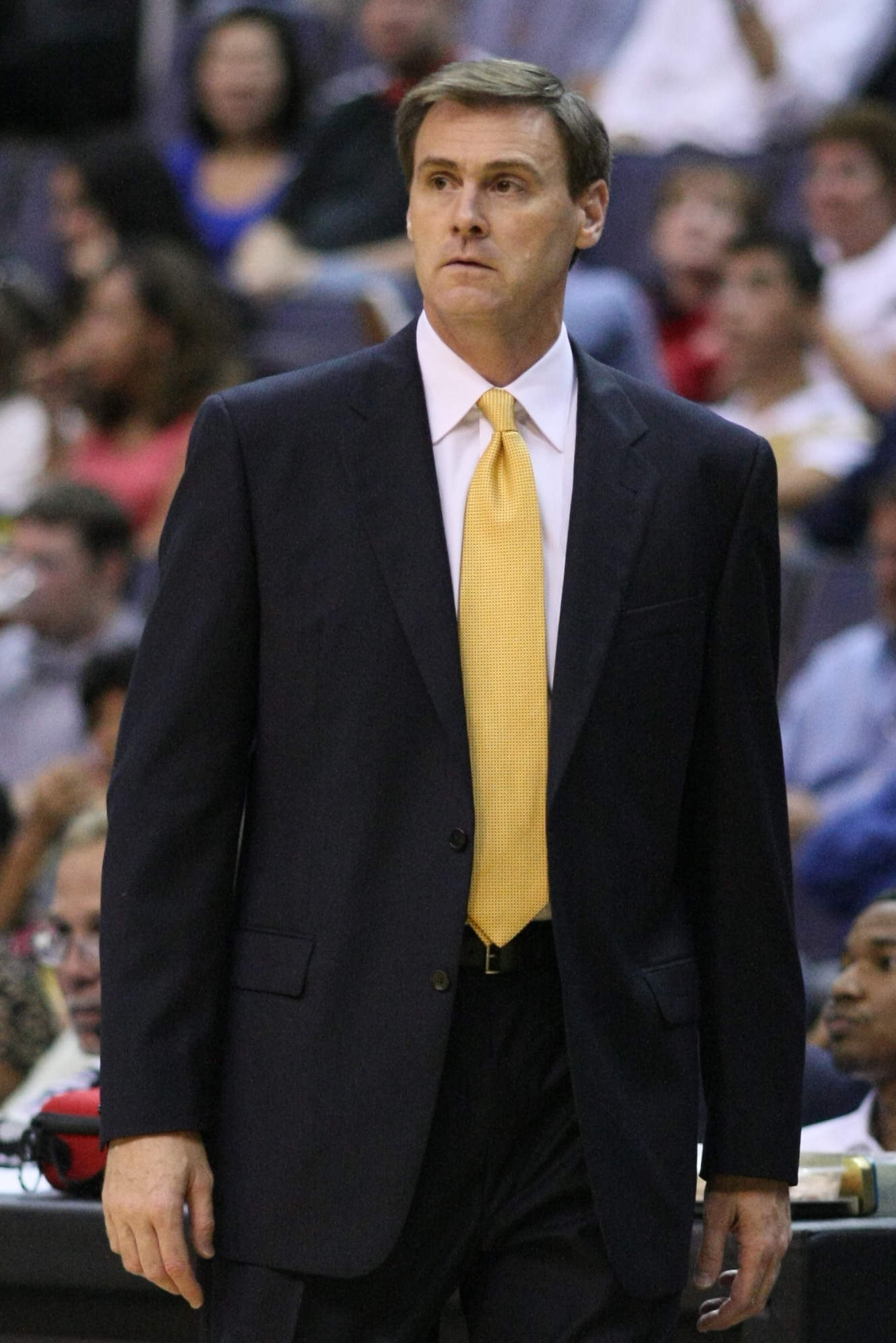
Flip Saunders (left) and Rick Carlisle (right) were selected as the West and East head coach, respectively.

The selections were based on teams with the best winning percentage in their respective conferences through games played on February 1. Although the Sacramento Kings had the best record in the Western Conference that day, their head coach, Rick Adelman, was ineligible to coach in the All-Star Game because he had coached in the 2003 game and league rules prohibit a coach from coaching in consecutive All-Star Games. In turn, the coach for the Western Conference team was Flip Saunders, head coach of the Minnesota Timberwolves. The coach for the Eastern Conference team was Rick Carlisle, head coach of the Eastern Conference leader Indiana Pacers.

=== Players ===
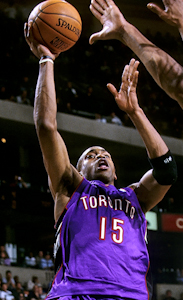
Vince Carter was the lead vote-getter for the fourth time in five years.

The rosters for the All-Star Game were chosen in two ways. The starters were chosen via a fan ballot. Two guards, two forwards and one center who received the highest vote were named the All-Star starters. The reserves were chosen by votes among the NBA head coaches in their respective conferences. The coaches were not permitted to vote for their own players. The reserves consist of two guards, two forwards, one center and two players regardless of position. If a player is unable to participate due to injury, the commissioner will select a replacement.

For the fourth time in the last five years, Vince Carter of the Toronto Raptors led the ballots with 2,127,183 votes, which earned him a starting position in the Eastern Conference team for the fifth year in a row. Allen Iverson, Tracy McGrady, Jermaine O'Neal, and Ben Wallace all completed the Eastern Conference starting position, which would've been the same starting line-up as the previous year, if Carter hadn't given his spot up for Michael Jordan. The Eastern Conference reserves included four first-time selections, Kenyon Martin, Jamaal Magloire, Ron Artest, and Michael Redd. Jason Kidd, Paul Pierce, and Baron Davis rounded out the team. Three teams, Indiana Pacers and New Jersey Nets, and New Orleans Hornets had two representations at the All-Star Game with O'Neal/Artest, Martin/Kidd, and Magloire/Davis.

The Western leading vote-getter was Kevin Garnett, who earned his seventh consecutive All-Star Game selection with 1,780,918 votes. Steve Francis, Kobe Bryant, Yao Ming, and Tim Duncan completed the Western Conference starting positions, making it also the same starting line-up as the previous year. The Western Conference reserves included two first-time selections, Sam Cassell of the Minnesota Timberwolves, and Andrei Kirilenko of the Utah Jazz. The team is rounded out by Ray Allen, Brad Miller, Dirk Nowitzki, Peja Stojaković, and Shaquille O'Neal. Four teams, Los Angeles Lakers, Minnesota Timberwolves, Houston Rockets, and Sacramento Kings, had two representations at the All-Star Game with Bryant/O'Neal, Garnett/Cassell, Francis/Yao, and Stojaković/Miller.

=== Roster ===
Eastern Conference All-Stars
Pos	Player	Team	No. of selections	Votes
Starters
G	Allen Iverson	Philadelphia 76ers	5th	1,731,648
G	Tracy McGrady	Orlando Magic	4th	1,231,825
F	Vince Carter	Toronto Raptors	5th	2,127,183
F	Jermaine O'Neal	Indiana Pacers	3rd	1,629,054
C	Ben Wallace	Detroit Pistons	2nd	1,982,251
Reserves
G	Baron Davis	New Orleans Hornets	2nd	—
G	Jason Kidd	New Jersey Nets	7th	—
G	Michael Redd	Milwaukee Bucks	1st	—
F	Paul Pierce	Boston Celtics	3rd	—
F	Ron Artest	Indiana Pacers	1st	—
F	Kenyon Martin	New Jersey Nets	1st	—
C	Jamaal Magloire	New Orleans Hornets	1st	—

Western Conference All-Stars
Pos	Player	Team	No. of selections	Votes
Starters
G	Steve Francis	Houston Rockets	3rd	976,841
G	Kobe Bryant	Los Angeles Lakers	6th	1,759,717
F	Kevin Garnett	Minnesota Timberwolves	7th	1,780,918
F	Tim Duncan	San Antonio Spurs	6th	1,681,435
C	Yao Ming	Houston Rockets	2nd	1,484,531
Reserves
G	Ray Allen	Seattle SuperSonics	4th	—
G	Sam Cassell	Minnesota Timberwolves	1st	—
F	Andrei Kirilenko	Utah Jazz	1st	—
F	Dirk Nowitzki	Dallas Mavericks	3rd	—
F	Peja Stojaković	Sacramento Kings	3rd	—
C	Brad Miller	Sacramento Kings	2nd	—
C	Shaquille O'Neal	Los Angeles Lakers	11th	—

- Here are the vote numbers; http://www.nba.com/allstar2004/allstar_game/starter_040129.html

TNT

February 15, 2004

Western Conference 136, Eastern Conference 132
Scoring by quarter: 31–33, 27–31, 45–37, 33–31
Pts: Shaquille O'Neal 24; Rebs: Tim Duncan 13; Asts: Sam Cassell 7	Pts: Jamaal Magloire 19; Rebs: Jermaine O'Neal 9 Asts: Allen Iverson 11

Staples Center, Los Angeles
Attendance: 19,662
Referees:
- Steve Javie
- Blane Reichelt
- Tom Washington

== All-Star Weekend ==
=== Slam Dunk Contest ===
Contestants
Pos.	Player	Team	Height	Weight	Pct
G	Fred Jones	Indiana Pacers	6–2	220	
G/F	Jason Richardson	Golden State Warriors	6–6	225	
F/C	Chris Andersen	Denver Nuggets	6-10	228	
G/F	Ricky Davis	Boston Celtics	6–7	195	

=== Three-Point Contest ===
Contestants
Pos.	Player	Team	Height	Weight	First round	Final round
G	Voshon Lenard	Denver Nuggets	6–4	205	18	18
F	Peja Stojaković	Sacramento Kings	6–10	229	21	16
G/F	Kyle Korver	Philadelphia 76ers	6–7	212	19	15
F	Rashard Lewis	Seattle SuperSonics	6–10	230	16	—
G	Cuttino Mobley	Houston Rockets	6–4	190	13	—
G	Chauncey Billups	Detroit Pistons	6-3	210	12	—

=== Rookie Challenge ===
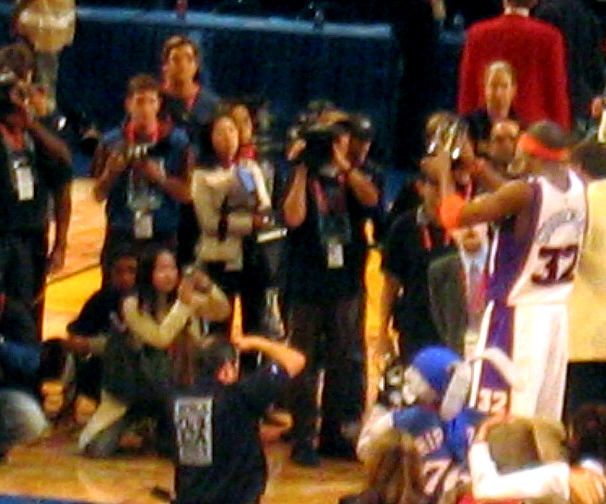
Stoudemire (far right) receiving the MVP award for the 2004 Rookie Challenge game.

Rookie Roster:

Player	Team
Carmelo Anthony	Denver Nuggets
Chris Bosh	Toronto Raptors
Dwyane Wade	Miami Heat
LeBron James	Cleveland Cavaliers
Jarvis Hayes	Washington Wizards
Kirk Hinrich	Chicago Bulls
Josh Howard	Dallas Mavericks
Chris Kaman	Los Angeles Clippers
Udonis Haslem	Miami Heat

Head Coach: Doug Collins
Assistant Coach: A.C. Green

Sophomore Roster:

Player	Team
Carlos Boozer	Cleveland Cavaliers
Mike Dunleavy Jr.	Golden State Warriors
Manu Ginóbili	San Antonio Spurs
Marko Jarić	Los Angeles Clippers
Ronald Murray	Seattle SuperSonics
Nenê	Denver Nuggets
Tayshaun Prince	Detroit Pistons
Amare Stoudemire	Phoenix Suns
Yao Ming	Houston Rockets

Head Coach: Michael Cooper
Assistant Coach: Kareem Abdul-Jabbar
