= 2003–04 Los Angeles Clippers season =

NBA professional basketball team season

- Head coach: Mike Dunleavy, Sr.
- Owners: Donald Sterling
- Arena: Staples Center

Results
- Record: 28–54 (.341)
- Place: Division: 7th (Pacific); Conference: 14th (Western)
- Playoff finish: Did not qualify
- Stats at Basketball Reference

Local media
- Television: Fox Sports Net West 2, KTLA
- Radio: KSPN

The 2003–04 Los Angeles Clippers season was the Clippers' 34th season in the National Basketball Association, and their 20th season in Los Angeles. During the offseason, the Clippers signed free agents Bobby Simmons and former All-Star forward Glen Rice. However, after 18 games, Rice was released. With the Clippers starting from scratch again as they celebrated their 20th season in L.A., they hired Mike Dunleavy, Sr. as their new head coach. Under Dunleavy, the Clippers played slightly around .500 with a 22–25 start as of February 6. However, after co-hosting the 2004 NBA All-Star Game at the Staples Center with the Lakers, the young Clippers struggled badly as they won just six games, and posted a 13-game losing streak near the end of the season. The Clippers would slowly sink down the standings, coming to rest once again at the bottom of the Pacific Division with a 28–54 record. Following the season, Quentin Richardson signed as a free agent with the Phoenix Suns.

== Draft picks ==
Round	Pick	Player	Position	Nationality	College
1	6	Chris Kaman	C	United States; Germany	Central Michigan

== Roster ==
Los Angeles Clippers roster
Players

Pos.	No.	Player	Height	Weight	DOB	From
F	22	Matt Barnes	6 ft 7 in (2.01 m)	235 lb (107 kg)	1980-03-09	UCLA
F/C	42	Elton Brand	6 ft 8 in (2.03 m)	272 lb (123 kg)	1979-03-11	Duke
G	1	Keyon Dooling	6 ft 3 in (1.91 m)	190 lb (86 kg)	1980-05-08	Missouri
F/C	14	Predrag Drobnjak	6 ft 11 in (2.11 m)	272 lb (123 kg)	1975-10-27	Serbia & Montenegro
C	2	Melvin Ely	6 ft 10 in (2.08 m)	261 lb (118 kg)	1978-05-02	Fresno State
G	5	Eddie House	6 ft 1 in (1.85 m)	175 lb (79 kg)	1978-05-14	Arizona State
G	20	Marko Jarić (injured)	6 ft 7 in (2.01 m)	217 lb (98 kg)	1978-10-12	Serbia & Montenegro
C	35	Chris Kaman	7 ft 0 in (2.13 m)	265 lb (120 kg)	1982-04-28	Central Michigan
G/F	50	Corey Maggette	6 ft 6 in (1.98 m)	225 lb (102 kg)	1979-11-12	Duke
C	34	Josh A. Moore (injured)	7 ft 2 in (2.18 m)	317 lb (144 kg)	1980-11-16	Michigan
G	24	Doug Overton	6 ft 3 in (1.91 m)	190 lb (86 kg)	1969-08-03	La Salle
G/F	3	Quentin Richardson	6 ft 5 in (1.96 m)	238 lb (108 kg)	1980-04-13	DePaul
G/F	21	Bobby Simmons	6 ft 6 in (1.98 m)	228 lb (103 kg)	1980-06-02	DePaul
F/C	54	Chris Wilcox	6 ft 10 in (2.08 m)	235 lb (107 kg)	1982-09-03	Maryland

Coaches
Head coach
- (United States) Mike Dunleavy, Sr. (South Carolina)
Assistant(s)
- (United States) Jim Eyen (UC Santa Barbara)
- (United States) Kim Hughes (Wisconsin)
- (United States) Neal Meyer (San Diego)
- (United States) Rory White (South Alabama)

Legend
- (DP) Unsigned draft pick
- (FA) Free agent
- (S) Suspended
- Injured

Roster
Updated: 2004-04-06

=== Roster Notes ===
- Forward Glen Rice becomes the 10th former Laker to play with the crosstown rival Clippers. He was waived after playing in 18 games and for refusing to be placed the injury reserve list.
- Center Olden Polynice's second tour of duty with the franchise. He previously played for the team from 1990 to 1992. He was the 12th man off the bench and only played 2 games before being waived.
- Guard Doug Overton's second tour of duty with the franchise as well. He previously played for the team in 2001–2002.
- Guard Randy Livingston was signed to a 10-day contract and played in 4 games before contract expired.

== Regular season ==
=== Season standings ===
Pacific Division	W	L	PCT	GB	Home	Road	Div
y-Los Angeles Lakers	56	26	.683	–	34–7	22–19	15–9
x-Sacramento Kings	55	27	.671	1	34–7	21–20	16–8
e-Portland Trail Blazers	41	41	.500	15	25–16	16–25	13–11
e-Seattle SuperSonics	37	45	.451	19	21–20	16–25	11–13
e-Golden State Warriors	37	45	.451	19	27–14	10–31	12–12
e-Phoenix Suns	29	53	.354	27	18–23	11–30	9–15
e-Los Angeles Clippers	28	54	.341	28	18–23	10–31	8–16

#	Western Conference				
#	Team	W	L	PCT	GB
1	c-Minnesota Timberwolves	58	24	.707	–
2	y-Los Angeles Lakers	56	26	.683	2
3	x-San Antonio Spurs	57	25	.695	1
4	x-Sacramento Kings	55	27	.671	3
5	x-Dallas Mavericks	52	30	.634	6
6	x-Memphis Grizzlies	50	32	.610	8
7	x-Houston Rockets	45	37	.549	13
8	x-Denver Nuggets	43	39	.524	15
9	e-Utah Jazz	42	40	.512	16
10	e-Portland Trail Blazers	41	41	.500	17
11	e-Seattle SuperSonics	37	45	.451	21
12	e-Golden State Warriors	37	45	.451	21
13	e-Phoenix Suns	29	53	.354	29
14	e-Los Angeles Clippers	28	54	.341	30

== Player statistics ==
Legend
GP	Games played	GS	Games started	MPG	Minutes per game
FG%	Field-goal percentage	3P%	3-point field-goal percentage	FT%	Free-throw percentage
RPG	Rebounds per game	APG	Assists per game	SPG	Steals per game
BPG	Blocks per game	PPG	Points per game

Player	GP	GS	MPG	FG%	3P%	FT%	RPG	APG	SPG	BPG	PPG
Corey Maggette	73	72	36.0	44.7	32.9	84.8	5.9	3.1	0.9	0.2	20.7
Elton Brand	69	68	38.7	49.3	0.0	77.3	10.3	3.3	0.9	2.2	20.0
Quentin Richardson	65	64	36.0	39.8	35.2	74.0	6.4	2.1	1.0	0.3	17.2
Chris Wilcox	65	17	20.6	52.1	0.0	70.0	4.7	0.8	0.4	0.3	8.6
Marko Jaric	58	50	30.3	38.8	34.0	73.3	3.0	4.8	1.6	0.3	8.5
Bobby Simmons	56	8	24.6	39.4	16.7	83.4	4.7	1.7	0.9	0.3	7.8
Eddie House	60	10	19.8	35.9	37.5	80.0	2.3	2.5	1.1	0.1	6.8
Predrag Drobnjak	61	14	15.6	39.3	30.6	84.9	3.2	0.6	0.4	0.4	6.3
Keyon Dooling	58	24	19.6	38.9	17.4	83.0	1.4	2.2	0.8	0.1	6.2
Chris Kaman	82	61	22.5	46.0	0.0	69.7	5.6	1.0	0.3	0.9	6.1
Matt Barnes	38	9	19.1	45.7	15.4	70.5	4.0	1.3	0.7	0.1	4.5
Doug Overton	55	11	18.4	40.5	13.0	72.4	1.5	2.4	0.5	0.0	3.9
Glen Rice	18	0	14.6	28.9	17.9	100.0	2.3	1.3	0.3	0.0	3.7
Melvin Ely	42	2	12.1	43.1	0.0	59.5	2.4	0.5	0.2	0.4	3.7
Randy Livingston	4	0	12.0	20.0	0.0	66.7	1.8	1.0	0.5	0.0	2.0
Wang Zhizhi	2	0	4.5	0.0	0.0	100.0	2.0	0.0	0.0	0.5	2.0
Olden Polynice	2	0	6.0	0.0	0.0	0.0	1.0	0.5	0.5	0.0	0.0

Player statistics citation:

== Transactions ==
The Clippers have been involved in the following transactions during the 2003–04 season.

=== Trades ===
September 28, 2003
To Los Angeles Clippers

- Predrag Drobnjak
To Seattle SuperSonics

- 2004 2nd-round draft pick

=== Free agents ===
==== Re-signed ====
Player	Signed	Contract
Corey Maggette	July 29, 2003	5-year deal (matched offer by Utah Jazz)
Elton Brand	September 19, 2003	6-year deal (matched offer by Miami Heat)

==== Additions ====
Player	Signed	Former team
Olden Polynice	August 4	Gary Steelheads (CBA)
Eddie House	August 13	Miami Heat
Josh Moore	September 23	Zhejiang Horses (CBA)
Bobby Simmons	September 27	Washington Wizards
Glen Rice	October 10	Utah Jazz
Doug Overton	November 21	New Jersey Nets
Randy Livingston	March 28	New Orleans Hornets

==== Subtractions ====
Player	Left	New team
Michael Olowokandi	free agency, July 16	Minnesota Timberwolves
Sean Rooks	free agency, July 21	New Orleans Hornets
Eric Piatkowski	free agency, July 26	Houston Rockets
Andre Miller	free agency, August 1	Denver Nuggets
Lamar Odom	free agency, August 26	Miami Heat
Wang Zhizhi	waived, October 21	Miami Heat
Tremaine Fowlkes	waived, October 22	Detroit Pistons
Cherokee Parks	free agency, November 9	Golden State Warriors
Glen Rice	waived, January 16	G-Force Fights (owner)
Olden Polynice	waived, February 26	Long Beach Jam (ABA)
Randy Livingston	contract expired, April 6	Utah Jazz

== See also ==
- 2003-04 NBA season
