= 2003–04 Dallas Mavericks season =

NBA professional basketball team season

- Head coach: Don Nelson
- President: Donnie Nelson
- General manager: Don Nelson
- Owner: Mark Cuban
- Arena: American Airlines Center

Results
- Record: 52–30 (.634)
- Place: Division: 3rd (Midwest); Conference: 5th (Western)
- Playoff finish: First round (lost to Kings 1–4)
- Stats at Basketball Reference

Local media
- Television: KTVT; KTXA; Fox Sports Net Southwest

The 2003–04 Dallas Mavericks season was the Mavericks' 24th season in the National Basketball Association. During the offseason, the Mavericks acquired Antawn Jamison from the Golden State Warriors, and All-Star forward Antoine Walker from the Boston Celtics. Although the team struggled with chemistry with a 15–12 start, the Mavericks went on a nine-game winning streak in January, and won eight of their final ten games. They finished third in the Midwest Division with a 52–30 record. Dirk Nowitzki was the only member of the team to be selected for the 2004 NBA All-Star Game. With the trio of Nowitzki, Michael Finley and Steve Nash along with NBA Sixth Man of the Year Jamison, the Mavericks continued their reputation as the best offensive team in the NBA. Notable were two rookies, Josh Howard and Marquis Daniels, who made an immediate impact, and were both selected to the All-Rookie Second Team.

However, the Mavericks were eliminated quickly four games to one in the playoffs, losing in the first round to their archrivals the Sacramento Kings. Following the season, Nash signed as a free agent with the Phoenix Suns, Walker was traded to the Atlanta Hawks and later returned to the Boston Celtics in midseason, and Jamison was dealt to the Washington Wizards.

The Mavericks sported gray alternate road uniforms for the season which only lasted one game.

== Offseason ==
=== Draft picks ===
Round	Pick	Player	Position	Nationality	College
1	29	Josh Howard	SF	United States	Wake Forest
2	57	Xue Yuyang	FC	China	

== Roster ==
2003–04 Dallas Mavericks roster
Players

Pos.	No.	Player	Height	Weight	DOB	From
SG	9	Tariq Abdul-Wahad (IN)	6 ft 6 in (1.98 m)	223 lb (101 kg)	1974-11-03	San José State
PG	3	Travis Best	5 ft 11 in (1.80 m)	182 lb (83 kg)	1972-07-12	Georgia Tech
C	44	Shawn Bradley	7 ft 6 in (2.29 m)	235 lb (107 kg)	1972-03-22	BYU
SG	6	Marquis Daniels	6 ft 6 in (1.98 m)	200 lb (91 kg)	1981-01-07	Auburn
SG	7	Tony Delk	6 ft 1 in (1.85 m)	189 lb (86 kg)	1974-01-28	Kentucky
SG	4	Michael Finley	6 ft 7 in (2.01 m)	225 lb (102 kg)	1973-03-06	Wisconsin
C	21	Danny Fortson	6 ft 7 in (2.01 m)	260 lb (118 kg)	1976-03-27	Cincinnati
SF	5	Josh Howard	6 ft 7 in (2.01 m)	210 lb (95 kg)	1980-04-28	Wake Forest
SF	33	Antawn Jamison	6 ft 9 in (2.06 m)	235 lb (107 kg)	1976-06-12	North Carolina
SF	14	Eduardo Nájera	6 ft 8 in (2.03 m)	235 lb (107 kg)	1976-07-11	Oklahoma
PG	13	Steve Nash	6 ft 3 in (1.91 m)	180 lb (82 kg)	1974-02-07	Santa Clara
F/C	41	Dirk Nowitzki	7 ft 0 in (2.13 m)	245 lb (111 kg)	1978-06-19	Germany
PF	8	Antoine Walker	6 ft 9 in (2.06 m)	265 lb (120 kg)	1976-08-12	Kentucky
C	42	Scott Williams	6 ft 10 in (2.08 m)	230 lb (104 kg)	1968-03-21	North Carolina

Coaches
Head coach
- Don Nelson
Assistant(s)
- Rolando Blackman
- Brad Davis (player development)
- Del Harris
- Charlie Parker
- Larry Riley
- Donnie Nelson

Legend
- (DP) Unsigned draft pick
- (FA) Free agent
- (S) Suspended
- Injured

Roster
Updated: January 30, 2004

=== Roster notes ===
- Center Shawn Bradley also holds American citizenship, but he played for the German national team and was born in Germany.
- Shooting guard Tariq Abdul-Wahad missed the entire season due to tendinitis in his left knee.

== Regular season ==
=== Season standings ===
Midwest Division	W	L	PCT	GB	Home	Road	Div
y-Minnesota Timberwolves	58	24	.707	–	31–10	27–14	14–10
x-San Antonio Spurs	57	25	.695	1	33–8	24–17	15–9
x-Dallas Mavericks	52	30	.634	6	36–5	16–25	14–10
x-Memphis Grizzlies	50	32	.610	8	31–10	19–22	12–12
x-Houston Rockets	45	37	.549	13	27–14	18–23	8–16
x-Denver Nuggets	43	39	.524	15	29–12	14–27	11–13
e-Utah Jazz	42	40	.512	16	28–13	14–27	10–14

#	Western Conference				
#	Team	W	L	PCT	GB
1	c-Minnesota Timberwolves	58	24	.707	–
2	y-Los Angeles Lakers	56	26	.683	2
3	x-San Antonio Spurs	57	25	.695	1
4	x-Sacramento Kings	55	27	.671	3
5	x-Dallas Mavericks	52	30	.634	6
6	x-Memphis Grizzlies	50	32	.610	8
7	x-Houston Rockets	45	37	.549	13
8	x-Denver Nuggets	43	39	.524	15
9	e-Utah Jazz	42	40	.512	16
10	e-Portland Trail Blazers	41	41	.500	17
11	e-Seattle SuperSonics	37	45	.451	21
12	e-Golden State Warriors	37	45	.451	21
13	e-Phoenix Suns	29	53	.354	29
14	e-Los Angeles Clippers	28	54	.341	30

z – clinched division title
y – clinched division title
x – clinched playoff spot

=== Game log ===
2003–04 game log
Total: 52–30 (home: 36–5; road: 16–25)
October: 1–1 (home: 0–0; road: 1–1)

Game	Date	Team	Score	High points	High rebounds	High assists	Location Attendance	Record
1	October 28	@ L.A. Lakers	L 93–109	Walker, Nowitzki (19)	Dirk Nowitzki (13)	Steve Nash (7)	Staples Center; 18,997	0–1
2	October 29	@ Golden State	W 95–87	Dirk Nowitzki (29)	Dirk Nowitzki (15)	Steve Nash (11)	The Arena in Oakland; 15,816	1–1

November : 10–5 (home: 9–0; road: 1–5)

Game	Date	Team	Score	High points	High rebounds	High assists	Location Attendance	Record
3	November 1	Utah	W 127–102	Tony Delk (22)	Antawn Jamison (10)	Steve Nash (7)	American Airlines Center; 19,923	2–1
4	November 3	Miami	W 103–93	Dirk Nowitzki (30)	Antoine Walker (9)	Steve Nash (11)	American Airlines Center; 19,463	3–1
5	November 5	@ Washington	L 90–100	Antawn Jamison (21)	Antawn Jamison (9)	Walker, Finley (5)	MCI Center; 17,455	3–2
6	November 6	@ Toronto	L 71–77	Dirk Nowitzki (27)	Antoine Walker (17)	Antoine Walker (7)	Air Canada Centre; 17,556	3–3
7	November 8	@ San Antonio	W 81–78	Antawn Jamison (20)	Dirk Nowitzki (11)	Steve Nash (6)	SBC Center; 18,797	4–3
8	November 11	New Orleans	W 125–97	Antoine Walker (21)	Danny Fortson (11)	Steve Nash (11)	American Airlines Center; 19,820	5–3
9	November 13	Houston	W 97–86	Dirk Nowitzki (23)	Antoine Walker (12)	Nash, Walker (7)	American Airlines Center; 19,663	6–3
10	November 15	@ Memphis	L 101–108 (OT)	Finley, Nowitzki (19)	Dirk Nowitzki (11)	Steve Nash (8)	Pyramid Arena; 16,195	6–4
11	November 17	Portland	W 105–98	Michael Finley (25)	Steve Nash (10)	Steve Nash (12)	American Airlines Center; 19,471	7–4
12	November 20	San Antonio	W 95–92	Dirk Nowitzki (26)	Antoine Walker (11)	Steve Nash (7)	American Airlines Center; 19,989	8–4
13	November 22	Denver	W 115–101	Antoine Walker (25)	Antoine Walker (14)	Steve Nash (8)	American Airlines Center; 20,122	9–4
14	November 25	Chicago	W 124–98	Michael Finley (28)	Danny Fortson (13)	Steve Nash (7)	American Airlines Center; 19,993	10–4
15	November 26	@ Phoenix	L 90–121	Antawn Jamison (17)	Antoine Walker (8)	Steve Nash (4)	America West Arena; 17,205	10–5
16	November 28	@ Denver	L 103–113	Antoine Walker (30)	Antoine Walker (15)	Steve Nash (9)	Pepsi Center; 19,628	10–6
17	November 29	Minnesota	W 92–88	Michael Finley (25)	Antoine Walker (10)	Walker, Nash (3)	American Airlines Center; 20,089	11–6

December : 7–6 (home: 5–2; road: 2–4)

Game	Date	Team	Score	High points	High rebounds	High assists	Location Attendance	Record
18	December 2	Washington	W 97–72	Antawn Jamison (21)	Michael Finley (12)	Antoine Walker (7)	American Airlines Center; 19,529	12–6
19	December 4	L.A. Lakers	L 103–114	Steve Nash (30)	Antoine Walker (12)	Steve Nash (8)	American Airlines Center; 20,596	12–7
20	December 6	Orlando	W 110–97	Antoine Walker (24)	Antoine Walker (16)	Steve Nash (9)	American Airlines Center; 19,843	13–7
21	December 10	@ L.A. Clippers	L 99–100	Michael Finley (38)	Antawn Jamison (8)	Antoine Walker (10)	Staples Center; 15,236	13–8
22	December 12	@ L.A. Lakers	W 110–93	Nowitzki, Walker (27)	Josh Howard (13)	Walker, Nash (7)	Staples Center; 18,997	14–8
23	December 15	Toronto	W 111–94	Antoine Walker (27)	Josh Howard (14)	Steve Nash (11)	American Airlines Center; 19,846	15–8
24	December 17	@ Boston	L 103–105	Dirk Nowitzki (30)	Danny Fortson (16)	Steve Nash (9)	FleetCenter; 18,624	15–9
25	December 18	@ Minnesota	L 109–114	Steve Nash (27)	Danny Fortson (9)	Steve Nash (9)	Target Center; 17,794	15–10
26	December 20	L.A. Clippers	L 105–115	Dirk Nowitzki (23)	Danny Fortson (10)	Steve Nash (11)	American Airlines Center; 20,058	15–11
27	December 23	@ Portland	L 88–97	Antawn Jamison (20)	Dirk Nowitzki (9)	Walker, Nash (6)	Rose Garden Arena; 14,556	15–12
28	December 25	@ Sacramento	W 111–103	Dirk Nowitzki (31)	Dirk Nowitzki (14)	Steve Nash (11)	ARCO Arena; 17,317	16–12
29	December 27	Memphis	W 104–98	Michael Finley (24)	Dirk Nowitzki (17)	Steve Nash (10)	American Airlines Center; 20,059	17–12
30	December 30	Milwaukee	W 101–92	Antoine Walker (22)	Antoine Walker (14)	Steve Nash (12)	American Airlines Center; 20,095	18–12

January : 11–6 (home: 6–2; road: 5–4)

Game	Date	Team	Score	High points	High rebounds	High assists	Location Attendance	Record
31	January 2	@ Milwaukee	L 101–109	Dirk Nowitzki (23)	Dirk Nowitzki (14)	Steve Nash (10)	Bradley Center; 18,717	18–13
32	January 3	Minnesota	W 119–112	Dirk Nowitzki (31)	Nowitzki, Jamison (9)	Steve Nash (13)	American Airlines Center; 19,936	19–13
33	January 5	@ Utah	L 94–108	Dirk Nowitzki (24)	Dirk Nowitzki (9)	Finley, Daniels (4)	Delta Center; 19,911	19–14
34	January 7	Golden State	W 105–99	Dirk Nowitzki (23)	Nowitzki, Fortson (11)	Steve Nash (12)	American Airlines Center; 20,185	20–14
35	January 9	Indiana	L 80–92	Dirk Nowitzki (20)	Antoine Walker (9)	Steve Nash (7)	American Airlines Center; 20,315	20–15
36	January 11	@ Detroit	L 102–115	Steve Nash (18)	Dirk Nowitzki (15)	Steve Nash (10)	The Palace of Auburn Hills; 22,076	20–16
37	January 12	@ New York	W 127–121 (OT)	Dirk Nowitzki (31)	Antoine Walker (12)	Antoine Walker (11)	Madison Square Garden; 18,230	21–16
38	January 14	Philadelphia	W 125–122 (2OT)	Michael Finley (32)	Antoine Walker (17)	Antoine Walker (13)	American Airlines Center; 20,221	22–16
39	January 16	@ Denver	W 91–88	Dirk Nowitzki (22)	Antoine Walker (10)	Travis Best (6)	Pepsi Center; 19,216	23–16
40	January 17	@ Portland	W 108–104	Michael Finley (33)	Dirk Nowitzki (7)	Antoine Walker (11)	Rose Garden Arena; 19,018	24–16
41	January 20	New Jersey	W 106–93	Antoine Walker (22)	Antoine Walker (13)	Dirk Nowitzki (6)	American Airlines Center; 19,906	25–16
42	January 22	L.A. Lakers	W 106–87	Michael Finley (31)	three players tied (9)	Steve Nash (8)	American Airlines Center; 20,512	26–16
43	January 23	@ Chicago	W 106–93	Dirk Nowitzki (25)	Dirk Nowitzki (11)	Steve Nash (7)	United Center; 18,761	27–16
44	January 25	Sacramento	W 108–99	Michael Finley (23)	Dirk Nowitzki (12)	Steve Nash (13)	American Airlines Center; 20,284	28–16
45	January 27	@ Seattle	W 118–116	Dirk Nowitzki (43)	Antoine Walker (8)	Steve Nash (8)	KeyArena; 15,835	29–16
46	January 28	@ Utah	L 88–91	Michael Finley (29)	Shawn Bradley (7)	Antoine Walker (8)	Delta Center; 19,515	29–17
47	January 31	Denver	L 102–107	Michael Finley (37)	Antoine Walker (10)	Antoine Walker (6)	American Airlines Center; 20,463	29–18

February : 9–2 (home: 7–0; road: 2–2)

Game	Date	Team	Score	High points	High rebounds	High assists	Location Attendance	Record
48	February 3	Golden State	W 107–93	Michael Finley (23)	Antawn Jamison (12)	Steve Nash (8)	American Airlines Center; 19,865	30–18
49	February 4	@ New Orleans	W 113–104	Dirk Nowitzki (28)	Dirk Nowitzki (11)	Steve Nash (12)	New Orleans Arena; 12,274	31–18
50	February 7	Detroit	W 111–108	Dirk Nowitzki (40)	Dirk Nowitzki (8)	Steve Nash (11)	American Airlines Center; 20,357	32–18
51	February 9	@ Atlanta	L 96–102	Michael Finley (24)	Antoine Walker (12)	Steve Nash (11)	Philips Arena; 9,713	32–19
52	February 10	New York	W 105–90	Dirk Nowitzki (27)	Dirk Nowitzki (12)	Steve Nash (8)	American Airlines Center; 20,363	33–19
All-Star Break
53	February 17	@ Memphis	L 92–109	Dirk Nowitzki (24)	Josh Howard (11)	Steve Nash (10)	Pyramid Arena; 14,742	33–20
54	February 18	@ Cleveland	W 114–98	Michael Finley (23)	Antoine Walker (11)	Steve Nash (10)	Gund Arena; 18,349	34–20
55	February 21	Houston	W 97–88	Dirk Nowitzki (25)	Dirk Nowitzki (12)	Steve Nash (9)	American Airlines Center; 20,431	35–20
56	February 24	L.A. Clippers	W 116–91	Antoine Walker (21)	Antawn Jamison (10)	Steve Nash (8)	American Airlines Center; 20,070	36–20
57	February 26	San Antonio	W 115–91	Michael Finley (30)	Antawn Jamison (8)	Steve Nash (9)	American Airlines Center; 20,458	37–20
58	February 28	Portland	W 111–91	Antoine Walker (25)	Antoine Walker (8)	Steve Nash (11)	American Airlines Center; 20,358	38–20

March : 8–8 (home: 4–1; road: 4–7)

Game	Date	Team	Score	High points	High rebounds	High assists	Location Attendance	Record
59	March 2	Seattle	W 107–96	Michael Finley (35)	Dirk Nowitzki (12)	Marquis Daniels (9)	American Airlines Center; 19,954	39–20
60	March 3	@ Minnesota	L 97–121	Finley, Daniels (16)	Danny Fortson (10)	Marquis Daniels (8)	Target Center; 19,006	39–21
61	March 5	@ San Antonio	L 100–113	Dirk Nowitzki (21)	Dirk Nowitzki (9)	Steve Nash (12)	SBC Center; 18,797	39–22
62	March 7	@ Houston	L 98–101	Steve Nash (22)	Michael Finley (7)	Steve Nash (9)	Toyota Center; 18,134	39–23
63	March 8	Phoenix	W 103–90	Dirk Nowitzki (26)	Eduardo Nájera (9)	Michael Finley (5)	American Airlines Center; 20,357	40–23
64	March 11	@ Sacramento	L 102–120	Dirk Nowitzki (21)	Dirk Nowitzki (8)	Steve Nash (7)	ARCO Arena; 17,317	40–24
65	March 13	@ Phoenix	W 113–90	Michael Finley (38)	Dirk Nowitzki (12)	Steve Nash (7)	America West Arena; 16,705	41–24
66	March 14	@ L.A. Clippers	W 101–88	Dirk Nowitzki (34)	Dirk Nowitzki (15)	Steve Nash (11)	Staples Center; 18,388	42–24
67	March 17	Atlanta	L 110–111	Steve Nash (30)	Antoine Walker (12)	Steve Nash (9)	American Airlines Center; 20,474	42–25
68	March 19	Boston	W 120–104	Dirk Nowitzki (24)	Antawn Jamison (12)	Steve Nash (10)	American Airlines Center; 20,257	43–25
69	March 21	@ New Jersey	W 101–98	Dirk Nowitzki (21)	four players tied (5)	Steve Nash (16)	Continental Airlines Arena; 17,745	44–25
70	March 22	@ Philadelphia	L 98–107	Dirk Nowitzki (30)	three players tied (6)	Steve Nash (8)	Wachovia Center; 19,176	44–26
71	March 24	@ Indiana	L 99–103	Dirk Nowitzki (22)	Antoine Walker (11)	Steve Nash (14)	Conseco Fieldhouse; 16,834	44–27
72	March 26	@ Miami	L 118–119 (OT)	Marquis Daniels (31)	Dirk Nowitzki (12)	Steve Nash (7)	American Airlines Arena; 16,500	44–28
73	March 28	@ Orlando	W 118–88	Dirk Nowitzki (25)	Josh Howard (12)	Steve Nash (11)	TD Waterhouse Centre; 16,428	45–28
74	March 30	Cleveland	W 126–109	Dirk Nowitzki (35)	Dirk Nowitzki (18)	Steve Nash (10)	American Airlines Center; 20,575	46–28

April : 6–2 (home: 5–0; road: 1–2)

Game	Date	Team	Score	High points	High rebounds	High assists	Location Attendance	Record
75	April 1	Sacramento	W 127–117	Michael Finley (29)	Dirk Nowitzki (10)	Steve Nash (19)	American Airlines Center; 20,533	47–28
76	April 3	Phoenix	W 124–103	Dirk Nowitzki (34)	Antoine Walker (9)	Steve Nash (14)	American Airlines Center; 20,348	48–28
77	April 6	Seattle	W 118–108	Michael Finley (24)	Nowitzki, Walker (8)	Steve Nash (14)	American Airlines Center; 20,223	49–28
78	April 8	Utah	W 117–94	Dirk Nowitzki (27)	Antawn Jamison (9)	Steve Nash (8)	American Airlines Center; 20,226	50–28
79	April 10	@ Seattle	L 99–119	Marquis Daniels (33)	Antawn Jamison (10)	Steve Nash (7)	KeyArena; 17,072	50–29
80	April 11	@ Golden State	L 107–108	Dirk Nowitzki (29)	Dirk Nowitzki (14)	Steve Nash (12)	The Arena in Oakland; 14,759	50–30
81	April 13	Memphis	W 110–103	Marquis Daniels (30)	Dirk Nowitzki (10)	Antoine Walker (9)	American Airlines Center; 20,364	51–30
82	April 14	@ Houston	W 92–89	Marquis Daniels (21)	Marquis Daniels (8)	Steve Nash (8)	Toyota Center; 18,169	52–30

2003–04 schedule

== Playoffs ==
2004 playoff game log
First round: 1–4 (home: 1–1; road: 0–3)

Game	Date	Team	Score	High points	High rebounds	High assists	Location Attendance	Series
1	April 18	@ Sacramento	L 105–116	Dirk Nowitzki (32)	Dirk Nowitzki (13)	Steve Nash (8)	ARCO Arena; 17,317	0–1
2	April 20	@ Sacramento	L 79–83	Dirk Nowitzki (28)	Marquis Daniels (11)	Steve Nash (9)	ARCO Arena; 17,317	0–2
3	April 24	Sacramento	W 104–79	Marquis Daniels (22)	Josh Howard (14)	Steve Nash (5)	American Airlines Center; 20,580	1–2
4	April 26	Sacramento	L 92–94	Dirk Nowitzki (21)	Dirk Nowitzki (14)	Steve Nash (9)	American Airlines Center; 20,677	1–3
5	April 29	@ Sacramento	L 118–119	Dirk Nowitzki (31)	Dirk Nowitzki (14)	Steve Nash (14)	ARCO Arena; 17,317	1–4

2004 schedule

== Player statistics ==
=== Regular season ===
Player	POS	GP	GS	MP	REB	AST	STL	BLK	PTS	MPG	RPG	APG	SPG	BPG	PPG
Antoine Walker	PF	82	82	2,840	684	369	65	65	1,151	34.6	8.3	4.5	.8	.8	14.0
Antawn Jamison	SF	82	2	2,376	520	70	83	30	1,212	29.0	6.3	.9	1.0	.4	14.8
Steve Nash	PG	78	78	2,612	232	687	67	8	1,128	33.5	3.0	8.8	.9	.1	14.5
Dirk Nowitzki	C	77	77	2,915	670	207	92	104	1,680	37.9	8.7	2.7	1.2	1.4	21.8
Michael Finley	SG	72	72	2,778	325	212	84	39	1,342	38.6	4.5	2.9	1.2	.5	18.6
Josh Howard	SF	67	29	1,589	368	97	69	54	575	23.7	5.5	1.4	1.0	.8	8.6
Shawn Bradley	C	66	5	773	173	20	33	74	219	11.7	2.6	.3	.5	1.1	3.3
Travis Best	PG	61	1	762	68	112	31	4	171	12.5	1.1	1.8	.5	.1	2.8
Eduardo Nájera	SF	58	7	720	156	25	35	19	176	12.4	2.7	.4	.6	.3	3.0
Danny Fortson	C	56	20	625	250	9	12	11	217	11.2	4.5	.2	.2	.2	3.9
Marquis Daniels	SG	56	15	1,039	146	116	53	12	477	18.6	2.6	2.1	.9	.2	8.5
Tony Delk	SG	33	11	509	59	28	27	7	197	15.4	1.8	.8	.8	.2	6.0
Scott Williams^{†}	C	27	11	260	60	11	5	9	81	9.6	2.2	.4	.2	.3	3.0
Mamadou N'Diaye^{†}	C	3	0	7	1	0	0	1	0	2.3	.3	.0	.0	.3	.0

- ^{†} Denotes player spent time with another team in the season. Stats reflect time with the Mavericks only.

=== Playoffs ===
Player	POS	GP	GS	MP	REB	AST	STL	BLK	PTS	MPG	RPG	APG	SPG	BPG	PPG
Dirk Nowitzki	C	5	5	212	59	7	7	13	133	42.4	11.8	1.4	1.4	2.6	26.6
Steve Nash	PG	5	5	197	26	45	4	0	68	39.4	5.2	9.0	.8	.0	13.6
Michael Finley	SG	5	5	196	16	13	4	3	65	39.2	3.2	2.6	.8	.6	13.0
Marquis Daniels	SG	5	5	184	31	15	10	3	79	36.8	6.2	3.0	2.0	.6	15.8
Antoine Walker	PF	5	5	140	50	12	6	3	49	28.0	10.0	2.4	1.2	.6	9.8
Antawn Jamison	SF	5	0	109	25	2	5	2	65	21.8	5.0	.4	1.0	.4	13.0
Josh Howard	SF	5	0	86	32	4	6	6	27	17.2	6.4	.8	1.2	1.2	5.4
Eduardo Nájera	SF	5	0	57	17	3	3	2	12	11.4	3.4	.6	.6	.4	2.4
Scott Williams	C	3	0	11	4	0	0	1	0	3.7	1.3	.0	.0	.3	.0
Shawn Bradley	C	2	0	3	0	0	0	0	0	1.5	.0	.0	.0	.0	.0
Tony Delk	SG	1	0	5	1	2	1	0	0	5.0	1.0	2.0	1.0	.0	.0

== Awards and records ==
- Antawn Jamison, NBA Sixth Man of the Year Award
- Dirk Nowitzki, All-NBA Third Team
- Dirk Nowitzki, NBA All-Star Game
- Josh Howard, NBA All-Rookie Team 2nd Team
- Marquis Daniels, NBA All-Rookie Team 2nd Team

== See also ==
- 2003–04 NBA season
