= 2003–04 San Antonio Spurs season =

- Head coach: Gregg Popovich
- President: Gregg Popovich
- General manager: R. C. Buford
- Owner: Peter Holt
- Arena: SBC Center

Results
- Record: 57–25 (.695)
- Place: Division: 2nd (Midwest); Conference: 3rd (Western)
- Playoff finish: Conference semifinals (lost to Lakers 2–4)
- Stats at Basketball Reference

Local media
- Television: Fox Sports Net Southwest, KENS, KRRT,

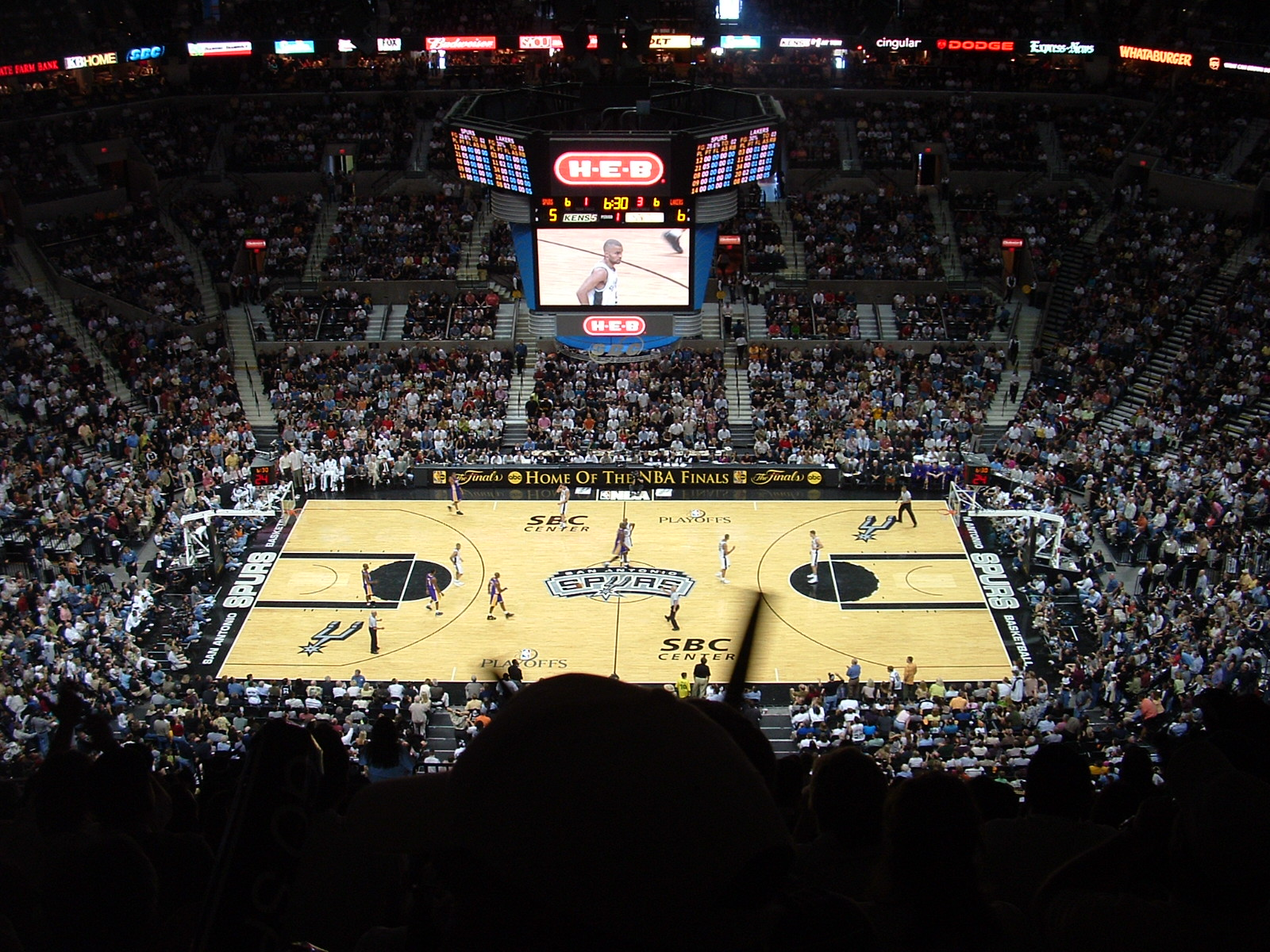
The San Antonio Spurs hosting the Los Angeles Lakers in Game 1 of the 2004 Western Conference Semifinals at the SBC Center.

The 2003–04 San Antonio Spurs season was the Spurs' 28th season in the National Basketball Association, the 31st in San Antonio, and 37th season as a franchise. This for time since 1988-89 season David Robinson was not on the opening day roster.

The Spurs entered the season as defending NBA champions, having defeated the New Jersey Nets in the 2003 NBA Finals in six games to win their second NBA championship. During the offseason, David Robinson, Danny Ferry, and Steve Kerr retired, Speedy Claxton signed with the Golden State Warriors, Stephen Jackson signed with the Atlanta Hawks, and Steve Smith signed with the New Orleans Hornets; in addition, the Spurs acquired Hedo Türkoğlu and Ron Mercer in a three-team trade, signed free agent Robert Horry (who had won championships with the Houston Rockets and the Los Angeles Lakers) and signed other free agents such as center Radoslav Nesterović. Despite the retirement of Robinson, and despite having a won-loss percentage of approximately .500 in November, the Spurs posted a 13-game winning streak in January and won their final eleven games of the season. The team finished second in the Midwest Division with a 57–25 record. Two-time MVP Tim Duncan was selected for the 2004 NBA All-Star Game.

The Spurs defeated the Memphis Grizzlies in four straight games in the first round of the playoffs. Although the Spurs took the first two games in a second-round rematch against the Los Angeles Lakers (the team they had eliminated in the previous season's Western Conference Semifinals), the Lakers, led by their "big four" of Karl Malone, Shaquille O'Neal, Kobe Bryant, and Gary Payton, responded by taking the next four games to eliminate the defending champions. The Lakers went on to reach the NBA Finals, where they lost to the Detroit Pistons in five games.

Following the season, Turkoglu signed as a free agent with the Orlando Magic and Kevin Willis signed with the Atlanta Hawks.

== Draft picks ==
Round	Pick	Player	Position	Nationality	College
1	28	Leandro Barbosa	G	Brazil	

== Roster ==
2003–04 San Antonio Spurs roster
Players

Pos.	No.	Player	Height	Weight	DOB	From
SF	12	Bruce Bowen	6 ft 7 in (2.01 m)	200 lb (91 kg)	1971-06-14	Cal State Fullerton
SG	23	Devin Brown	6 ft 5 in (1.96 m)	210 lb (95 kg)	1978-12-30	Texas–San Antonio
SG	3	Matt Carroll	6 ft 6 in (1.98 m)	212 lb (96 kg)	1980-08-28	Notre Dame
PF	21	Tim Duncan	6 ft 11 in (2.11 m)	255 lb (116 kg)	1976-04-25	Wake Forest
SG	10	Alex Garcia	6 ft 3 in (1.91 m)	220 lb (100 kg)	1980-03-04	Brazil
SG	20	Manu Ginóbili	6 ft 6 in (1.98 m)	200 lb (91 kg)	1977-07-28	Argentina
PG	1	Jason Hart	6 ft 3 in (1.91 m)	180 lb (82 kg)	1978-04-29	Syracuse
PF	5	Robert Horry	6 ft 10 in (2.08 m)	240 lb (109 kg)	1970-08-25	Alabama
PF	4	Sean Marks	6 ft 10 in (2.08 m)	250 lb (113 kg)	1975-08-23	California
C	8	Rasho Nesterović	7 ft 0 in (2.13 m)	255 lb (116 kg)	1976-05-30	Slovenia
PG	9	Tony Parker	6 ft 2 in (1.88 m)	185 lb (84 kg)	1982-05-17	France
PF	31	Malik Rose	6 ft 7 in (2.01 m)	250 lb (113 kg)	1974-11-23	Drexel
SF	14	Hedo Türkoğlu	6 ft 10 in (2.08 m)	220 lb (100 kg)	1979-03-19	Turkey
PG	17	Charlie Ward	6 ft 2 in (1.88 m)	190 lb (86 kg)	1970-10-12	Florida State
C	42	Kevin Willis	7 ft 0 in (2.13 m)	245 lb (111 kg)	1962-09-06	Michigan State

Coaches
Head coach
- Gregg Popovich
Assistant(s)
- Mike Budenholzer
- P. J. Carlesimo
- Mario Elie
- Joe Prunty
- Will Sevening (trainer)

Legend
- (DP) Unsigned draft pick
- (FA) Free agent
- (S) Suspended
- Injured

Roster
Updated: March 8, 2004

== Regular season ==
=== Season standings ===
Midwest Division	W	L	PCT	GB	Home	Road	Div
y-Minnesota Timberwolves	58	24	.707	–	31–10	27–14	14–10
x-San Antonio Spurs	57	25	.695	1	33–8	24–17	15–9
x-Dallas Mavericks	52	30	.634	6	36–5	16–25	14–10
x-Memphis Grizzlies	50	32	.610	8	31–10	19–22	12–12
x-Houston Rockets	45	37	.549	13	27–14	18–23	8–16
x-Denver Nuggets	43	39	.524	15	29–12	14–27	11–13
e-Utah Jazz	42	40	.512	16	28–13	14–27	10–14

#	Western Conference				
#	Team	W	L	PCT	GB
1	c-Minnesota Timberwolves	58	24	.707	–
2	y-Los Angeles Lakers	56	26	.683	2
3	x-San Antonio Spurs	57	25	.695	1
4	x-Sacramento Kings	55	27	.671	3
5	x-Dallas Mavericks	52	30	.634	6
6	x-Memphis Grizzlies	50	32	.610	8
7	x-Houston Rockets	45	37	.549	13
8	x-Denver Nuggets	43	39	.524	15
9	e-Utah Jazz	42	40	.512	16
10	e-Portland Trail Blazers	41	41	.500	17
11	e-Seattle SuperSonics	37	45	.451	21
12	e-Golden State Warriors	37	45	.451	21
13	e-Phoenix Suns	29	53	.354	29
14	e-Los Angeles Clippers	28	54	.341	30

z - clinched division title
y - clinched division title
x - clinched playoff spot

=== Regular season ===
2003–04 game log
Total: 57–25 (home: 33–8; road: 24–17)
October: 1–1 (home: 1–0; road: 0–1)

Game	Date	Team	Score	High points	High rebounds	High assists	Location Attendance	Record
1	October 28	Denver	W 83–82	Tim Duncan (24)	Tim Duncan (12)	Anthony Carter (6)	SBC Center; 18,797	1–0
2	October 29	@ Denver	L 72–80	Tim Duncan (17)	Tim Duncan (21)	Manu Ginóbili (6)	Pepsi Center; 17,429	1–1

November: 8–7 (home: 6–2; road: 2–5)

Game	Date	Team	Score	High points	High rebounds	High assists	Location Attendance	Record
3	November 1	New York	W 86–74	Tim Duncan (15)	Tim Duncan (15)	Manu Ginóbili (5)	SBC Center; 18,797	2–1
4	November 3	@ Memphis	L 80–88	Rasho Nesterovic, Manu Ginóbili (13)	Rasho Nesterovic (14)	Jason Hart (8)	Pyramid Arena; 12,821	2–2
5	November 4	Miami	W 80–73	Manu Ginóbili (15)	Malik Rose (11)	Manu Ginóbili (5)	SBC Center; 17,666	3–2
6	November 6	L. A. Lakers	L 117–120 (2OT)	Manu Ginóbili (33)	Manu Ginóbili (12)	Manu Ginóbili (7)	SBC Center; 18,797	3–3
7	November 8	Dallas	L 78–81	Malik Rose (20)	Malik Rose (22)	Manu Ginóbili (7)	SBC Center; 18,797	3–4
8	November 10	Utah	W 87–78	Manu Ginóbili (18)	Tim Duncan (10)	Tim Duncan (5)	SBC Center; 18,797	4–4
9	November 12	@ New Jersey	W 85–71	Tim Duncan (31)	Tim Duncan (12)	Tony Parker (4)	Continental Airlines Arena; 13,286	5–4
10	November 14	@ Philadelphia	L 96–100	Tim Duncan (35)	Tim Duncan (15)	Manu Ginóbili (8)	Wachovia Center; 20,344	5–5
11	November 15	@ Washington	W 95–71	Malik Rose (23)	Tim Duncan (13)	Hedo Turkoglu, Bruce Bowen, Jason Hart (5)	MCI Center; 20,173	6–5
12	November 18	Golden State	W 94–81	Tim Duncan (21)	Tim Duncan (10)	Tony Parker (6)	SBC Center; 17,098	7–5
13	November 20	@ Dallas	L 92–95	Tim Duncan (30)	Tim Duncan (17)	Tony Parker (9)	American Airlines Center; 19,989	7–6
14	November 21	Atlanta	W 114–75	Tim Duncan (25)	Tim Duncan (10)	Tony Parker (6)	SBC Center; 18,797	8–6
15	November 26	Chicago	W 109–98	Manu Ginóbili (17)	Manu Ginóbili (11)	Manu Ginóbili (8)	SBC Center; 16,771	9–6
16	November 28	@ L. A. Lakers	L 87–103	Manu Ginóbili (13)	Tim Duncan (11)	Manu Ginóbili, Kevin Willis (4)	STAPLES Center; 18,997	9–7
17	November 29	@ Golden State	L 89–91	Tim Duncan (27)	Tim Duncan (15)	Manu Ginóbili (6)	The Arena in Oakland; 17,680	9–8

December: 13–2 (home: 7–1; road: 6–1)

Game	Date	Team	Score	High points	High rebounds	High assists	Location Attendance	Record
18	December 1	@ L. A. Clippers	L 83–91	Malik Rose (26)	Malik Rose (11)	Manu Ginóbili (5)	STAPLES Center; 12,514	9–9
19	December 3	L. A. Lakers	L 86–90	Tim Duncan (30)	Tim Duncan (15)	Manu Ginóbili (4)	SBC Center; 18,841	9–10
20	December 5	@ Orlando	W 105–94	Tim Duncan (47)	Tim Duncan (12)	Tony Parker (11)	TD Waterhouse Centre; 15,394	10–10
21	December 6	@ Miami	W 86–70	Tim Duncan, Rasho Nesterovic (21)	Tim Duncan (19)	Tony Parker (11)	AmericanAirlines Arena; 14,603	11–10
22	December 8	@ Chicago	W 96–82	Manu Ginóbili (26)	Tim Duncan (14)	Tony Parker (7)	United Center; 18,233	12–10
23	December 10	Portland	W 102–77	Tim Duncan (18)	Tim Duncan (14)	Manu Ginóbili, Tony Parker (6)	SBC Center; 15,131	13–10
24	December 11	@ Houston	W 71–67	Tim Duncan (22)	Rasho Nesterovic (11)	Tony Parker (10)	Toyota Center; 18,170	14–10
25	December 13	Houston	L 73–86	Manu Ginóbili (16)	Tim Duncan (12)	Tony Parker (12)	SBC Center; 18,797	15–10
26	December 15	Memphis	W 78–67	Tim Duncan (21)	Rasho Nesterovic (15)	Manu Ginóbili (8)	SBC Center; 14,524	16–10
27	December 17	Toronto	W 73–70	Tim Duncan (30)	Tim Duncan (13)	Tim Duncan (5)	SBC Center; 16,375	17–10
28	December 19	@ Seattle	W 87–73	Tim Duncan (27)	Tim Duncan (20)	Hedo Turkoglu (6)	KeyArena; 15,712	18–10
29	December 20	@ Portland	W 101–91	Tim Duncan (26)	Tim Duncan (10)	Tony Parker (10)	Rose Garden Arena; 15,010	19–10
30	December 23	L. A. Clippers	W 111–90	Tim Duncan (22)	Tim Duncan (10)	Tony Parker (14)	SBC Center; 18,797	20–10
31	December 26	Orlando	W 98–83	Tim Duncan (27)	Tim Duncan (16)	Manu Ginóbili (7)	SBC Center; 18,797	21–10
32	December 28	Milwaukee	W 89–74	Manu Ginóbili (25)	Tim Duncan (15)	Tony Parker (5)	SBC Center; 18,797	22–10

January: 9–8 (home: 4–4; road: 5–4)

Game	Date	Team	Score	High points	High rebounds	High assists	Location Attendance	Record
33	January 3	Philadelphia	L 77–83	Hedo Turkoglu (16)	Tim Duncan (12)	Tony Parker (5)	SBC Center; 18,797	22–11
34	January 5	@ Denver	W 98–74	Tim Duncan (30)	Tim Duncan (12)	Tim Duncan (7)	Pepsi Center; 15,120	23–11
35	January 6	Washington	W 94–72	Tim Duncan, Tony Parker (16)	Tim Duncan (11)	Tim Duncan (6)	SBC Center; 16,413	24–11
36	January 9	@ New Orleans	W 94–84	Tim Duncan, Bruce Bowen (15)	Rasho Nesterovic (9)	Tony Parker (8)	New Orleans Arena; 17,740	25–11
37	January 10	Indiana	W 89–88 (OT)	Tim Duncan (30)	Tim Duncan (15)	Tony Parker (7)	SBC Center; 18,797	26–11
38	January 13	@ Atlanta	L 77–86	Tim Duncan (28)	Tim Duncan (9)	Bruce Bowen (3)	Philips Arena; 11,807	26–12
39	January 14	Minnesota	L 93–100	Tim Duncan (36)	Tim Duncan (20)	Tim Duncan (7)	SBC Center; 17,411	26–13
40	January 16	@ Indiana	L 79–89	Tim Duncan (16)	Robert Horry (10)	Tim Duncan, Manu Ginóbili (7)	Conseco Fieldhouse; 18,044	26–14
41	January 18	@ Boston	W 109–92	Rasho Nesterovic (23)	Rasho Nesterovic (13)	Hedo Turkoglu (7)	FleetCenter; 18,624	27–14
42	January 19	@ Detroit	L 77–85	Tim Duncan (17)	Tim Duncan (10)	Tim Duncan (6)	The Palace of Auburn Hills; 22,076	27–15
43	January 21	New Jersey	W 99–76	Tim Duncan (21)	Tim Duncan (17)	Tim Duncan (5)	SBC Center; 17,441	28–15
44	January 23	@ Phoenix	W 86–84	Tim Duncan (25)	Tim Duncan (12)	Tim Duncan (5)	America West Arena; 17,799	29–15
45	January 24	New Orleans	L 96–98	Malik Rose (20)	Tim Duncan (13)	Manu Ginóbili (5)	SBC Center; 17,897	29–16
46	January 26	@ Milwaukee	L 92–93	Tony Parker (26)	Tim Duncan (8)	Tony Parker (6)	Bradley Center; 14,385	29–17
47	January 27	@ New York	W 77–67	Tim Duncan (30)	Tim Duncan (19)	Manu Ginóbili (6)	Madison Square Garden; 19,190	30–17
48	January 29	Sacramento	L 91–96	Tim Duncan (35)	Tim Duncan (8)	Tony Parker (6)	SBC Center; 17,669	30–18
49	January 31	Utah	W 85–81	Tim Duncan (33)	Tim Duncan (14)	Tim Duncan, Manu Ginóbili, Tony Parker (3)	SBC Center; 18,797	31–18

February: 8–2 (home: 2–0; road: 6–2)

Game	Date	Team	Score	High points	High rebounds	High assists	Location Attendance	Record
50	February 2	Utah	@ W 83–65	Tim Duncan (31)	Tim Duncan (11)	Tony Parker (6)	Delta Center; 19,911	32–18
51	February 5	Seattle	@ W 96–90	Tim Duncan (23)	Tim Duncan (14)	Tony Parker (5)	KeyArena; 15,256	33–18
52	February 6	Sacramento	@ W 102–94	Tim Duncan (28)	Tim Duncan (14)	Tony Parker (7)	ARCO Arena; 17,317	34–18
53	February 9	Houston	@ W 85–82	Tim Duncan (28)	Tim Duncan (10)	Tony Parker (9)	Toyota Center; 16,040	35–18
All-Star Break
54	February 18	Toronto	@ W 86–82	Tim Duncan (26)	Tim Duncan (21)	Tony Parker (3)	Air Canada Centre; 17,119	36–18
55	February 20	Cleveland	@ L 87–89	Tim Duncan, Manu Ginóbili (21)	Tim Duncan (12)	Tony Parker (5)	Gund Arena; 20,562	36–19
56	February 22	Minnesota	@ W 94–92	Tony Parker (26)	Hedo Turkoglu (14)	Manu Ginóbili (6)	Target Center; 20,347	37–19
57	February 24	Houston	W 86–77	Tim Duncan (27)	Tim Duncan (13)	Tony Parker (7)	SBC Center; 18,797	38–19
58	February 26	@ Dallas	L 91–115	Tim Duncan (22)	Tim Duncan (17)	Hedo Turkoglu, Charlie Ward (4)	American Airlines Center; 20,458	38–20
59	February 28	Denver	W 117–92	Tony Parker (29)	Rasho Nesterovic (12)	Manu Ginóbili (5)	SBC Center; 18,797	39–20

March: 11–5 (home: 10–1; road: 1–4)

Game	Date	Team	Score	High points	High rebounds	High assists	Location Attendance	Record
60	March 1	Memphis	L 80–81	Hedo Turkoglu (19)	Rasho Nesterovic, Malik Rose (10)	Manu Ginóbili (9)	SBC Center; 16,705	39–21
61	March 3	Seattle	W 88–84	Hedo Turkoglu (18)	Rasho Nesterovic (12)	Tony Parker (7)	SBC Center; 16,611	40–21
62	March 5	Dallas	W 113–100	Tony Parker (27)	Rasho Nesterovic (15)	Rasho Nesterovic, Tony Parker (5)	SBC Center; 18,797	41–21
63	March 6	@ Phoenix	W 107–86	Rasho Nesterovic (22)	Rasho Nesterovic (13)	Rasho Nesterovic, Tony Parker (5)	America West Arena; 16,039	42–21
64	March 9	@ Memphis	L 88–94	Tony Parker (24)	Malik Rose (14)	Tony Parker (7)	Pyramid Arena; 15,544	42–22
65	March 10	L. A. Clippers	W 108–90	Malik Rose (21)	Malik Rose (12)	Manu Ginóbili (8)	SBC Center; 16,919	43–22
66	March 12	Golden State	W 99–74	Malik Rose (17)	Hedo Turkoglu (9)	Tony Parker (12)	SBC Center; 17,174	44–22
67	March 14	@ Sacramento	L 87–101	Manu Ginóbili (16)	Rasho Nesterovic (13)	Tony Parker (5)	ARCO Arena; 17,317	44–23
68	March 15	@ Golden State	L 80–97	Tony Parker (29)	Rasho Nesterovic (7)	Tony Parker (6)	The Arena in Oakland; 14,153	44–24
69	March 18	Minnesota	W 106–86	Tim Duncan (22)	Tim Duncan (10)	Tony Parker, Hedo Turkoglu (7)	SBC Center; 18,797	45–24
70	March 20	Boston	W 103–87	Tim Duncan, Manu Ginóbili (26)	Tim Duncan (15)	Tony Parker (5)	SBC Center; 19,034	46–24
71	March 23	@ Minnesota	L 81–86	Tim Duncan (26)	Hedo Turkoglu (15)	Tony Parker (12)	Target Center; 20,111	46–25
72	March 25	Detroit	W 84–75	Manu Ginóbili (17)	Tim Duncan (13)	Tony Parker (7)	SBC Center; 17,695	47–25
73	March 27	Phoenix	W 105–76	Hedo Turkoglu, Tim Duncan (14)	Tim Duncan (10)	Tony Parker, Manu Ginóbili, Devin Brown (5)	SBC Center; 18,797	48–25
74	March 29	Cleveland	W 101–93	Manu Ginóbili (21)	Manu Ginóbili (8)	Tim Duncan, Hedo Turkoglu, Tony Parker, Robert Horry (3)	SBC Center; 18,797	49–25
75	March 31	Sacramento	W 107–89	Manu Ginóbili (29)	Tim Duncan, Hedo Turkoglu, Rasho Nesterovic (7)	Tony Parker (6)	SBC Center; 18,797	50–25

April: 7–0 (home: 3–0; road: 4–0)

Game	Date	Team	Score	High points	High rebounds	High assists	Location Attendance	Record
76	April 2	@ Utah	W 94–81	Devin Brown (19)	Tim Duncan, Rasho Nesterovic (10)	Tony Parker (5)	Delta Center; 19,911	51–25
77	April 4	@ L. A. Lakers	W 95–89	Tony Parker (29)	Tim Duncan (13)	Tony Parker (9)	STAPLES Center; 18,997	52–25
78	April 7	Seattle	W 96–75	Tim Duncan (21)	Tim Duncan, Rasho Nesterovic (10)	Tim Duncan, Rasho Nesterovic, Hedo Turkoglu, Tony Parker, Manu Ginóbili (3)	SBC Center; 18,797	53–25
79	April 9	Portland	W 84–74	Tim Duncan, Manu Ginóbili (21)	Tim Duncan (14)	Manu Ginóbili (5)	SBC Center; 18,797	54–25
80	April 11	@ L. A. Clippers	W 88–79	Tim Duncan (26)	Tim Duncan (9)	Tony Parker (8)	STAPLES Center; 18,031	55–25
81	April 12	@ Portland	W 78–66	Tony Parker (22)	Tim Duncan (15)	Tony Parker (5)	Rose Garden Arena; 18,997	56–25
82	April 14	Denver	W 93–67	Tim Duncan (23)	Tim Duncan (16)	Manu Ginóbili (5)	SBC Center; 18,797	57–25

2003–04 season schedule

== Playoffs ==
2004 playoff game log
First Round: 4–0 (home: 2–0; road: 2–0)

Game	Date	Team	Score	High points	High rebounds	High assists	Location Attendance	Series
1	April 17	Memphis	W 98–74	Tim Duncan (26)	Tim Duncan (9)	Tony Parker (8)	SBC Center; 18,797	1–0
2	April 19	Memphis	W 87–70	Tony Parker (27)	Tim Duncan (12)	Tony Parker (7)	SBC Center; 18,797	2–0
3	April 22	@ Memphis	W 95–93	Tim Duncan (22)	Tim Duncan (13)	Tony Parker (6)	The Pyramid; 19,351	3–0
4	April 25	@ Memphis	W 110–97	Tony Parker (29)	Duncan, Horry (6)	Tony Parker (13)	The Pyramid; 19,351	4–0

Conference Semifinals: 2–4 (home: 2–1; road: 0–3)

Game	Date	Team	Score	High points	High rebounds	High assists	Location Attendance	Series
1	May 2	L.A. Lakers	W 88–78	Tim Duncan (30)	Tim Duncan (11)	Tony Parker (9)	SBC Center; 18,797	1–0
2	May 5	L.A. Lakers	W 95–85	Tony Parker (30)	Bowen, Duncan (7)	Manu Ginóbili (6)	SBC Center; 18,797	2–0
3	May 9	@ L.A. Lakers	L 81–105	Manu Ginóbili (17)	Tim Duncan (13)	Tony Parker (5)	Staples Center; 18,997	2–1
4	May 11	@ L.A. Lakers	L 90–98	Manu Ginóbili (21)	Tim Duncan (10)	Duncan, Parker (8)	Staples Center; 18,997	2–2
5	May 13	L.A. Lakers	L 73–74	Tim Duncan (21)	Tim Duncan (21)	Tony Parker (6)	SBC Center; 18,797	2–3
6	May 15	@ L.A. Lakers	L 76–88	Tim Duncan (20)	Tim Duncan (11)	Manu Ginóbili (4)	Staples Center; 18,997	2–4

2004 schedule

== Player statistics ==
=== Ragular season ===
Player	POS	GP	GS	MP	REB	AST	STL	BLK	PTS	MPG	RPG	APG	SPG	BPG	PPG
Bruce Bowen	SF	82	82	2,624	253	113	84	33	565	32.0	3.1	1.4	1.0	.4	6.9
Rasho Nesterović	C	82	82	2,353	633	114	51	165	710	28.7	7.7	1.4	.6	2.0	8.7
Robert Horry	PF	81	1	1,290	272	101	48	49	392	15.9	3.4	1.2	.6	.6	4.8
Hedo Türkoğlu	SF	80	44	2,073	358	154	80	32	739	25.9	4.5	1.9	1.0	.4	9.2
Manu Ginóbili	SG	77	38	2,260	344	291	136	16	987	29.4	4.5	3.8	1.8	.2	12.8
Tony Parker	PG	75	75	2,577	237	411	61	7	1,099	34.4	3.2	5.5	.8	.1	14.7
Tim Duncan	PF	69	68	2,527	859	213	62	185	1,538	36.6	12.4	3.1	.9	2.7	22.3
Malik Rose	PF	67	13	1,256	320	69	36	24	529	18.7	4.8	1.0	.5	.4	7.9
Devin Brown	SG	58	0	627	130	33	15	4	234	10.8	2.2	.6	.3	.1	4.0
Jason Hart	PG	53	5	660	79	81	28	5	177	12.5	1.5	1.5	.5	.1	3.3
Kevin Willis	C	48	0	373	98	11	21	9	164	7.8	2.0	.2	.4	.2	3.4
Ron Mercer	SG	39	0	516	49	22	14	5	195	13.2	1.3	.6	.4	.1	5.0
Charlie Ward^{†}	PG	36	0	425	48	45	17	3	119	11.8	1.3	1.3	.5	.1	3.3
Shane Heal	PG	6	0	72	4	5	1	0	22	12.0	.7	.8	.2	.0	3.7
Anthony Carter	PG	5	2	87	11	12	4	0	22	17.4	2.2	2.4	.8	.0	4.4
Matt Carroll^{†}	SG	3	0	22	3	1	1	0	6	7.3	1.0	.3	.3	.0	2.0
Alex Garcia	SG	2	0	13	0	0	2	0	3	6.5	.0	.0	1.0	.0	1.5

- ^{†} Denotes player spent time with another team in the season. Stats reflect time with the Spurs only.

=== Playoffs ===
Player	POS	GP	GS	MP	REB	AST	STL	BLK	PTS	MPG	RPG	APG	SPG	BPG	PPG
Tim Duncan	PF	10	10	405	113	32	8	20	221	40.5	11.3	3.2	.8	2.0	22.1
Tony Parker	PG	10	10	386	21	70	13	1	184	38.6	2.1	7.0	1.3	.1	18.4
Bruce Bowen	SF	10	10	298	29	10	4	3	60	29.8	2.9	1.0	.4	.3	6.0
Hedo Türkoğlu	SF	10	10	271	45	15	9	1	77	27.1	4.5	1.5	.9	.1	7.7
Rasho Nesterović	C	10	10	261	55	10	3	11	59	26.1	5.5	1.0	.3	1.1	5.9
Manu Ginóbili	SG	10	0	280	53	31	17	1	130	28.0	5.3	3.1	1.7	.1	13.0
Robert Horry	PF	10	0	211	63	9	8	2	61	21.1	6.3	.9	.8	.2	6.1
Devin Brown	SG	9	0	130	18	9	3	1	52	14.4	2.0	1.0	.3	.1	5.8
Jason Hart	PG	7	0	62	3	1	5	0	22	8.9	.4	.1	.7	.0	3.1
Malik Rose	PF	7	0	58	17	6	4	2	10	8.3	2.4	.9	.6	.3	1.4
Kevin Willis	C	7	0	25	6	0	1	0	6	3.6	.9	.0	.1	.0	.9
Charlie Ward	PG	5	0	13	0	1	2	0	11	2.6	.0	.2	.4	.0	2.2

== Awards and records ==
- Tim Duncan, All-NBA First Team
- Bruce Bowen, NBA All-Defensive First Team
- Tim Duncan, NBA All-Defensive Second Team

== See also ==
- 2003-04 NBA season
