= Linton Johnson =

American basketball player (born 1980)

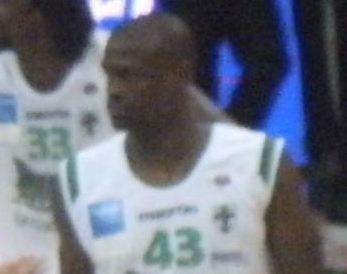

Free agent
- Position: Power forward

Personal information
- Born: June 13, 1980 (age 46) Chicago, Illinois
- Listed height: 6 ft 8 in (2.03 m)
- Listed weight: 205 lb (93 kg)

Career information
- High school: Providence St. Mel (Chicago, Illinois)
- College: Tulane (1998–2002)
- NBA draft: 2002: undrafted
- Playing career: 2002–present

Career history
- 2003: Rockford Lightning
- 2003–2004: Chicago Bulls
- 2004–2005: San Antonio Spurs
- 2005–2006: New Jersey Nets
- 2006–2007: New Orleans/Oklahoma City Hornets
- 2007: Tau Ceramica
- 2008: Phoenix Suns
- 2008: Toronto Raptors
- 2008: Charlotte Bobcats
- 2009: Chicago Bulls
- 2010–2013: Scandone Avellino
- 2013–2014: Dinamo Sassari
- 2014: Pallacanestro Varese
- 2014–2015: Pistoia Basket 2000
- 2016: Juvecaserta Basket
- 2016–2017: Scafati Basket
- 2017: Juvecaserta Basket
- 2017–2018: San Nicola Basket Cedri
- 2018–2019: New Basket Caserta
- 2019–2021: Basket Club Irpinia
- 2021–Current: Step Back Caiazzo

Career highlights
- NBA champion (2005); Spanish Supercup champion (2007); Coppa Campania (2018)
- Stats at NBA.com
- Stats at Basketball Reference

Linton Johnson III (born June 13, 1980) is an American professional basketball player. He is married to a woman from Caserta, and has Italian citizenship.

Linton Johnson is the nephew of former NBA player Mickey Johnson.

== Career ==
After a four-year college career at Tulane University, he began his professional career in 2003–04 as an undrafted free agent playing 41 games including 20 starts for the Chicago Bulls. He also played for the Charlotte Bobcats, San Antonio Spurs, New Jersey Nets, New Orleans Hornets and the Phoenix Suns, with whom he signed a 10-day contract late in the 2007–08 season. The Suns did not renew his contract, and on March 27, 2008, Johnson signed another 10-day contract with the Toronto Raptors. After the contract expired, Johnson re-signed with the Suns on April 16, 2008.

On March 11, 2009, Johnson was signed to the first of two 10-day contracts by the Chicago Bulls. It was his second stint with the Bulls. He was signed for the remainder of the season after initially being released when his second 10-day contract expired. He was waived on July 30, 2009.

In September 2009, Johnson signed with the Orlando Magic. He was waived on October 28, 2009.

In August 2010 he signed with the Italian pro team Air Avellino.

On July 9, 2013, he signed with Dinamo Sassari. He parted ways with them on January 22, 2014. Next day he signed with Pallacanestro Varese.

In August 2014 he signed a one-year deal with the Italian team Giorgio Tesi Group Pistoia. On January 22, 2015, he was released by Pistoia Basket.

On March 18, 2016, he signed with Juvecaserta Basket for the rest of the 2015–16 Serie A season.

On October 19, 2016, he signed with Scafati Basket for the rest of the 2016–17 Serie A2 season. On January 24, 2017, he left Scafati and returned to Juvecaserta Basket.

== NBA career statistics ==
Legend
GP	Games played	GS	Games started	MPG	Minutes per game
FG%	Field goal percentage	3P%	3-point field goal percentage	FT%	Free throw percentage
RPG	Rebounds per game	APG	Assists per game	SPG	Steals per game
BPG	Blocks per game	PPG	Points per game	**Bold**	Career high
†	Won an NBA championship

=== Regular season ===
Year	Team	GP	GS	MPG	FG%	3P%	FT%	RPG	APG	SPG	BPG	PPG
2003–04	Chicago	41	**20**	17.9	.355	.212	.595	**4.5**	**.7**	**.9**	**.8**	4.2
2004–05†	San Antonio	2	0	7.5	.000	.000	.000	1.5	.0	.5	.0	.0
2005–06	New Jersey	9	0	3.9	**.500**	.000	.250	.8	.2	.2	.0	1.2
2005–06	New Orleans/Oklahoma City	27	7	**18.1**	.403	.361	.739	4.3	.4	.4	.4	**5.3**
2006–07	New Orleans/Oklahoma City	**54**	0	13.3	.489	.333	.811	3.0	.3	.6	.3	4.2
2007–08	Phoenix	6	0	8.8	**.500**	**.500**	.000	2.2	.5	.0	.2	2.5
2007–08	Toronto	2	0	5.0	.400	.000	**1.000**	.5	.5	.0	.0	3.0
2008–09	Charlotte	2	0	6.5	.000	.000	.000	.0	.0	.0	.0	.0
2008–09	Chicago	8	0	5.3	.364	**.500**	.000	1.0	.3	.1	.0	1.1
Career		151	27	14.0	.416	.305	.699	3.3	.4	.6	.4	3.9

=== Playoffs ===
Year	Team	GP	GS	MPG	FG%	3P%	FT%	RPG	APG	SPG	BPG	PPG
2009	Chicago	3	0	3.3	.500	.000	1.000	1.3	.3	.0	.0	1.3
Career		3	0	3.3	.500	.000	1.000	1.3	.3	.0	.0	1.3
