= Bo Outlaw =

American basketball player (born 1971)

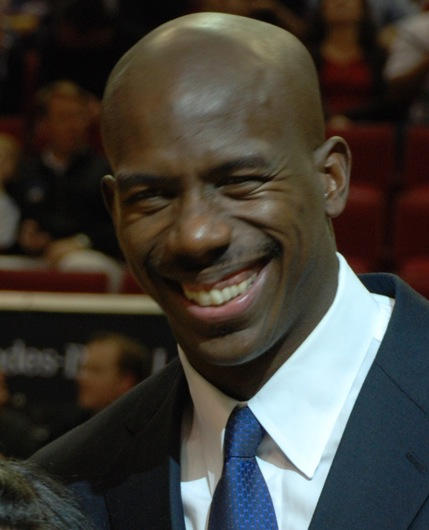
- Outlaw in 2009

Personal information
- Born: April 13, 1971 (age 55) San Antonio, Texas, U.S.
- Listed height: 6 ft 8 in (2.03 m)
- Listed weight: 220 lb (100 kg)

Career information
- High school: John Jay (San Antonio, Texas)
- College: South Plains (1989–1991); Houston (1991–1993)
- NBA draft: 1993: undrafted
- Playing career: 1993–2007
- Position: Power forward / center
- Number: 6, 45, 46

Career history
- 1993–1994: Grand Rapids Hoops
- 1993: CB Estudiantes
- 1994–1997: Los Angeles Clippers
- 1997–2001: Orlando Magic
- 2001–2003: Phoenix Suns
- 2003–2004: Memphis Grizzlies
- 2004–2005: Phoenix Suns
- 2005–2007: Orlando Magic

Career highlights
- All-CBA Second Team (1994); CBA All-Defensive Team (1994); CBA All-Rookie First Team (1994); CBA blocks leader (1994); First-team All-SWC (1993); Second-team All-SWC (1992)

Career NBA statistics
- Points: 4,970 (5.4 ppg)
- Rebounds: 4,437 (4.9 rpg)
- Assists: 1,441 (1.6 apg)
- Stats at NBA.com
- Stats at Basketball Reference

Charles "Bo" Outlaw (born April 13, 1971) is an American former professional basketball player. He was born in San Antonio, Texas, and is a 1989 alumnus of John Jay High School.

Outlaw led the Mustangs to a 38–0 record his senior year before losing to Clear Lake High School in the state championship game. Outlaw played for South Plains College and the University of Houston. During his time in Houston, he averaged 14.0 ppg, 9.1 rpg, and led NCAA Division I with a field goal percentage of .684. In 1993, he declared eligibility for the NBA draft but was not selected.

== Professional career ==
Outlaw began his professional career with the Grand Rapids Hoops of the Continental Basketball Association (CBA), where he averaged a league-leading 3.8 blocks per game. He was selected to the All-CBA Second Team, All-Defensive Team and All-Rookie First Team in 1994.

On February 15, 1994, Outlaw began his NBA career with the Los Angeles Clippers, recording 13 points and 7 rebounds in a 100–89 win over the Los Angeles Lakers. He played three full seasons for the Clippers, who made the playoffs in 1997 but were defeated by the Utah Jazz in the first round.

=== Orlando Magic ===
Outlaw left Los Angeles as a free agent and signed a two-year deal with the Orlando Magic on September 5, 1997.

During Outlaw's 1997–98 season, he started in 76 of 82 regular season games and recorded what would remain career-high averages in every statistical category except for assists. However, the Magic failed to reach the playoffs in 1998. After Hall of Fame coach Chuck Daly retired and was replaced by Doc Rivers, Outlaw signed another contract with the Magic in the off-season, after which he played two and a half more seasons for the team.

On April 17, 1998, Outlaw recorded 25 points, 13 rebounds, and 10 assists in a 121–109 win over the New Jersey Nets. After the game, reporters asked him how he felt about his first triple-double, to which Outlaw famously replied: "What's that, some kind of hamburger?".

=== Phoenix, Memphis, and returns to Phoenix and Orlando ===
Outlaw was released in November 2001 and acquired by the Phoenix Suns. After one and a half seasons with them, Outlaw left for Memphis where he was reunited with former Magic teammate Mike Miller. In 2004, after one season in Memphis, Outlaw returned to Phoenix where he was hampered by nagging injuries and his playing time was restricted by the strength of the team. Accordingly, in the 2005–06 season, he returned to the Magic, appearing in 75 additional games in the course of three seasons. Outlaw was waived in November 2007 after playing 7 minutes over two games in the 2007–08 season.

Over his NBA career (914 games) he averaged 5.4 points and 4.9 rebounds. He currently resides in Orlando.

== NBA career statistics ==
Legend
GP	Games played	GS	Games started	MPG	Minutes per game
FG%	Field goal percentage	3P%	3-point field goal percentage	FT%	Free throw percentage
RPG	Rebounds per game	APG	Assists per game	SPG	Steals per game
BPG	Blocks per game	PPG	Points per game	**Bold**	Career high
*	Led the league

=== Regular season ===
Year	Team	GP	GS	MPG	FG%	3P%	FT%	RPG	APG	SPG	BPG	PPG
1993–94	L.A. Clippers	37	14	23.5	.587	.000	.592	5.7	1.0	1.0	1.0	6.9
1994–95	L.A. Clippers	81	31	20.4	.523	.000	.441	3.9	1.0	1.1	1.9	5.2
1995–96	L.A. Clippers	80	3	12.3	.575	.000	.444	2.5	.6	.6	1.1	3.6
1996–97	L.A. Clippers	82	25	26.8	.609	.000	.504	5.5	1.9	1.1	1.7	7.6
1997–98	Orlando	82*	**76**	**36.0**	.554	.250	.575	**7.8**	2.6	1.3	**2.2**	**9.5**
1998–99	Orlando	31	22	27.5	.545	.000	.432	5.4	1.8	1.3	1.4	6.5
1999–00	Orlando	82	55	28.4	.602	.000	.506	6.4	**3.0**	**1.4**	1.8	6.0
2000–01	Orlando	80	69	31.7	.614	**.500**	.573	7.7	2.8	1.3	1.7	7.3
2001–02	Orlando	**10***	0	16.0	.619	–	.444	2.9	.5	.9	.9	3.4
2001–02	Phoenix	**73***	36	24.2	.550	**.500**	.417	4.6	1.7	.8	1.1	4.7
2002–03	Phoenix	80	20	22.5	.550	.000	.621	4.6	1.4	.6	.9	4.7
2003–04	Memphis	82	1	19.6	.510	.000	.526	4.2	1.1	.9	.9	4.6
2004–05	Phoenix	39	0	5.5	.353	–	.556	1.4	.3	.2	.3	.7
2005–06	Orlando	32	0	11.1	.603	–	**.625**	2.4	.4	.3	.4	2.3
2006–07	Orlando	41	0	11.2	**.667**	–	.591	2.6	.4	.4	.1	2.0
2007–08	Orlando	2	0	3.3	**.667**	–	–	.0	.0	.0	.0	2.0
Career		914	352	22.7	.567	.079	.521	4.9	1.6	.9	1.3	5.4

=== Playoffs ===
Year	Team	GP	GS	MPG	FG%	3P%	FT%	RPG	APG	SPG	BPG	PPG
1997	L.A. Clippers	3	0	22.0	.545	.000	.300	4.7	1.3	.3	.7	5.0
1999	Orlando	4	0	20.8	.600	–	.462	3.8	.5	.3	**2.0**	4.5
2001	Orlando	4	**4**	**33.5**	**.615**	–	.182	**10.5**	**2.3**	**1.3**	1.5	**8.5**
2003	Phoenix	**6**	0	11.7	.100	–	**.500**	2.2	.8	.2	.2	.7
2004	Memphis	4	0	15.3	.000	–	**.500**	1.0	1.5	.5	.5	.5
2005	Phoenix	1	0	2.0	.000	–	–	.0	1.0	1.0	.0	.0
Career		22	4	18.9	.446	.000	.357	4.0	1.2	.5	.9	3.3

== See also ==
- List of NBA career field goal percentage leaders
