= 2003–04 Utah Jazz season =

NBA professional basketball team season

- Head coach: Jerry Sloan
- Arena: Delta Center

Results
- Record: 42–40 (.512)
- Place: Division: 7th (Midwest); Conference: 9th (Western)
- Playoff finish: Did not qualify
- Stats at Basketball Reference

Local media
- Television: KJZZ-TV; Fox Sports Net Utah
- Radio: KFNZ/KBEE

The 2003–04 Utah Jazz season was the Jazz's 30th in the National Basketball Association. Without their dynamic duo of John Stockton and Karl Malone, not much was expected out of the Jazz entering the season. However, with young stars like Andrei Kirilenko picking up the slack while being selected for the 2004 NBA All-Star Game, the Jazz were competitive all season. With the exception of a slump in January and February, the Jazz remained above .500 all season as they battled the Denver Nuggets for the final playoff spot in the Western Conference. The Jazz finished last place in the Midwest Division with a 42–40 record, and failed to qualify for the playoffs for the first time in twenty-one seasons. Their 42–40 record was their nineteenth consecutive winning season, a record which stood until the San Antonio Spurs broke it with their 20th consecutive winning season in 2016–17.

Following the season, Greg Ostertag signed as a free agent with the Sacramento Kings.

== Draft picks ==
Round	Pick	Player	Position	Nationality	College
1	19	Sasha Pavlovic	SG	Montenegro	
2	47	Mo Williams	PG	United States	Alabama

== Roster ==
2003–04 Utah Jazz roster
Players

Pos.	No.	Player	Height	Weight	DOB	From
G	30	Carlos Arroyo	6 ft 2 in (1.88 m)	200 lb (91 kg)	1979–07–30	FIU
SG	19	Raja Bell	6 ft 5 in (1.96 m)	210 lb (95 kg)	1976–09–19	FIU
C	22	Curtis Borchardt (injured)	7 ft 0 in (2.13 m)	240 lb (109 kg)	1980–09–13	Stanford
C	31	Jarron Collins	6 ft 11 in (2.11 m)	248 lb (112 kg)	1978–12–02	Stanford
SG	10	Gordan Giriček	6 ft 7 in (2.01 m)	225 lb (102 kg)	1977–06–20	Croatia
PF	42	Tom Gugliotta	6 ft 10 in (2.08 m)	250 lb (113 kg)	1969–12–19	NC State
SG	15	Matt Harpring (injured)	6 ft 7 in (2.01 m)	230 lb (104 kg)	1976–05–31	Georgia Tech
F	47	Andrei Kirilenko	6 ft 9 in (2.06 m)	220 lb (100 kg)	1981–02–18	Russia
PG	24	Raül López	6 ft 0 in (1.83 m)	185 lb (84 kg)	1980–04–15	Spain
PF	54	Mikki Moore	6 ft 11 in (2.11 m)	225 lb (102 kg)	1975–11–04	Nebraska
C	00	Greg Ostertag	7 ft 2 in (2.18 m)	280 lb (127 kg)	1973–03–06	Kansas
SG	11	Sasha Pavlović	6 ft 7 in (2.01 m)	235 lb (107 kg)	1983–11–15	Montenegro
F/C	51	Michael Ruffin	6 ft 8 in (2.03 m)	248 lb (112 kg)	1977–01–21	Tulsa
PG	25	Mo Williams	6 ft 1 in (1.85 m)	198 lb (90 kg)	1982–12–19	Alabama

Coaches
Head coach
- Jerry Sloan
Assistant(s)
- Gordon Chiesa
- David Fredman
- Phil Johnson
- Kenny Natt
- Mark McKown (player development)

Legend
- (DP) Unsigned draft pick
- (FA) Free agent
- (S) Suspended
- Injured

Roster

== Regular season ==
=== Season standings ===
Midwest Division	W	L	PCT	GB	Home	Road	Div
y-Minnesota Timberwolves	58	24	.707	–	31–10	27–14	14–10
x-San Antonio Spurs	57	25	.695	1	33–8	24–17	15–9
x-Dallas Mavericks	52	30	.634	6	36–5	16–25	14–10
x-Memphis Grizzlies	50	32	.610	8	31–10	19–22	12–12
x-Houston Rockets	45	37	.549	13	27–14	18–23	8–16
x-Denver Nuggets	43	39	.524	15	29–12	14–27	11–13
e-Utah Jazz	42	40	.512	16	28–13	14–27	10–14

#	Western Conference				
#	Team	W	L	PCT	GB
1	c-Minnesota Timberwolves	58	24	.707	–
2	y-Los Angeles Lakers	56	26	.683	2
3	x-San Antonio Spurs	57	25	.695	1
4	x-Sacramento Kings	55	27	.671	3
5	x-Dallas Mavericks	52	30	.634	6
6	x-Memphis Grizzlies	50	32	.610	8
7	x-Houston Rockets	45	37	.549	13
8	x-Denver Nuggets	43	39	.524	15
9	e-Utah Jazz	42	40	.512	16
10	e-Portland Trail Blazers	41	41	.500	17
11	e-Seattle SuperSonics	37	45	.451	21
12	e-Golden State Warriors	37	45	.451	21
13	e-Phoenix Suns	29	53	.354	29
14	e-Los Angeles Clippers	28	54	.341	30

== Player statistics ==
Legend
GP	Games played	GS	Games started	MPG	Minutes per game
FG%	Field-goal percentage	3P%	3-point field-goal percentage	FT%	Free-throw percentage
RPG	Rebounds per game	APG	Assists per game	SPG	Steals per game
BPG	Blocks per game	PPG	Points per game

=== Season ===
Player	GP	GS	MPG	FG%	3FG%	FT%	RPG	APG	SPG	BPG	PPG
Carlos Arroyo	71	71	28.3	.441	.325	.804	2.6	5.0	.9	.1	12.6
Raja Bell	82	4	24.6	.409	.373	.786	2.9	1.3	.8	.2	11.2
Curtis Borchardt	16	0	16.1	.393	.000	.778	3.4	.9	.3	.9	3.6
Keon Clark	2	0	13.5	.333			3.5	.5	.5	.0	2.0
Jarron Collins	81	31	21.4	.498	.000	.718	3.9	1.0	.3	.2	6.0
Gordan Giriček^{†}	25	18	24.2	.431	.359	.883	2.5	1.7	.6	.2	13.5
Paul Grant	10	0	9.8	.478		.375	1.7	.3	.1	.1	2.5
Tom Gugliotta^{†}	25	24	20.6	.375	.333	.700	5.2	1.7	.7	.3	3.7
Ben Handlogten	17	0	10.1	.532		.667	3.2	.4	.2	.2	4.0
Matt Harpring	31	31	36.6	.471	.242	.688	8.0	2.0	.7	.1	16.2
Andrei Kirilenko	78	78	37.1	.443	.338	.790	8.1	3.1	1.9	2.8	16.5
Raül López	82	11	19.7	.431	.294	.863	1.9	3.7	.8	.0	7.0
Mikki Moore^{†}	28	0	13.8	.521		.857	2.9	.7	.3	.5	4.6
Greg Ostertag	78	51	27.6	.476	.000	.579	7.4	1.6	.4	1.8	6.8
Aleksandar Pavlović	79	14	14.5	.396	.271	.774	2.0	.8	.5	.2	4.8
Michael Ruffin	41	23	17.9	.325		.421	5.0	1.0	.5	.5	2.2
DeShawn Stevenson^{†}	54	54	28.0	.445	.233	.669	3.3	1.7	.5	.3	11.4
Mo Williams	57	0	13.5	.380	.256	.786	1.3	1.3	.5	.0	5.0

== Awards and records ==
- Andrei Kirilenko, NBA All-Defensive Second Team
