= 2003–04 Houston Rockets season =

- Head coach: Jeff Van Gundy
- General manager: Carroll Dawson
- Owner: Leslie Alexander
- Arena: Toyota Center

Results
- Record: 45–37 (.549)
- Place: Division: 5th (Midwest); Conference: 7th (Western)
- Playoff finish: First round (lost to Lakers 1–4)
- Stats at Basketball Reference

Local media
- Television: KNWS-51, KIAH

The 2003–04 Houston Rockets season was the Rockets' 37th season in the National Basketball Association, and their 33rd season in the city of Houston. The season saw the Rockets move their home games from Compaq Center to the new Toyota Center. During the offseason, the Rockets hired head coach Jeff Van Gundy, who is best known for his tenure with the New York Knicks, and signed free agent Jim Jackson. Midway through the season, they signed free agent point guard Mark Jackson. The Rockets finished fifth in the Midwest Division with a 45–37 record, and qualified for the playoffs for the first time since 1999 as the number 7 seed in the Western Conference. Second-year star Yao Ming and Steve Francis were both selected for the 2004 NBA All-Star Game. However, the Rockets were eliminated from the first round of the playoffs by the Los Angeles Lakers, who added Karl Malone and Gary Payton to join Shaquille O'Neal and Kobe Bryant, in five games. This also marked Francis' only playoff appearance in his career. Following the season, he was traded along with Cuttino Mobley and Kelvin Cato to the Orlando Magic, and Mark Jackson retired.

For the season, the team sported new uniforms and a new logo, they remained in used until 2019.

== Offseason ==
=== NBA draft ===
Round	Pick	Player	Position	Nationality	School/Club
2	44	Malick Badiane	Forward	Senegal	Langen (Germany)

== Roster ==
2003–04 Houston Rockets roster
Players

Pos.	No.	Player	Height	Weight	DOB	From
F/C	13	Kelvin Cato	6 ft 11 in (2.11 m)	275 lb (125 kg)		Iowa State
G	3	Steve Francis	6 ft 3 in (1.91 m)	210 lb (95 kg)		Maryland
G/F	7	Adrian Griffin (injured)	6 ft 5 in (1.96 m)	217 lb (98 kg)		Seton Hall
F	21	Jim Jackson	6 ft 6 in (1.98 m)	220 lb (100 kg)		Ohio State
G	31	Mark Jackson	6 ft 1 in (1.85 m)	180 lb (82 kg)		St. John's
C	11	Yao Ming	7 ft 6 in (2.29 m)	310 lb (141 kg)		China
G/F	5	Cuttino Mobley	6 ft 4 in (1.93 m)	190 lb (86 kg)		Rhode Island
F	9	Boštjan Nachbar	6 ft 9 in (2.06 m)	221 lb (100 kg)		Slovenia
F	35	Scott Padgett	6 ft 9 in (2.06 m)	240 lb (109 kg)		Kentucky
G/F	52	Eric Piatkowski	6 ft 7 in (2.01 m)	215 lb (98 kg)		Nebraska
F/C	2	Maurice Taylor	6 ft 9 in (2.06 m)	265 lb (120 kg)		Michigan
F	30	Clarence Weatherspoon	6 ft 6 in (1.98 m)	240 lb (109 kg)		Southern Miss
G	29	Mike Wilks	5 ft 10 in (1.78 m)	180 lb (82 kg)		Rice

Coaches
Head coach
- Jeff Van Gundy (Nazareth)
Assistant(s)
- Tom Thibodeau (Salem State)
- Steve Clifford
- Patrick Ewing
- Andy Greer

Legend
- (DP) Unsigned draft pick
- (FA) Free agent
- (S) Suspended
- Injured

Roster

== Regular season ==
=== Season standings ===
Midwest Division	W	L	PCT	GB	Home	Road	Div
y-Minnesota Timberwolves	58	24	.707	–	31–10	27–14	14–10
x-San Antonio Spurs	57	25	.695	1	33–8	24–17	15–9
x-Dallas Mavericks	52	30	.634	6	36–5	16–25	14–10
x-Memphis Grizzlies	50	32	.610	8	31–10	19–22	12–12
x-Houston Rockets	45	37	.549	13	27–14	18–23	8–16
x-Denver Nuggets	43	39	.524	15	29–12	14–27	11–13
e-Utah Jazz	42	40	.512	16	28–13	14–27	10–14

#	Western Conference				
#	Team	W	L	PCT	GB
1	c-Minnesota Timberwolves	58	24	.707	–
2	y-Los Angeles Lakers	56	26	.683	2
3	x-San Antonio Spurs	57	25	.695	1
4	x-Sacramento Kings	55	27	.671	3
5	x-Dallas Mavericks	52	30	.634	6
6	x-Memphis Grizzlies	50	32	.610	8
7	x-Houston Rockets	45	37	.549	13
8	x-Denver Nuggets	43	39	.524	15
9	e-Utah Jazz	42	40	.512	16
10	e-Portland Trail Blazers	41	41	.500	17
11	e-Seattle SuperSonics	37	45	.451	21
12	e-Golden State Warriors	37	45	.451	21
13	e-Phoenix Suns	29	53	.354	29
14	e-Los Angeles Clippers	28	54	.341	30

== Playoffs ==
2004 playoff game log
First Round: 1–4 (home: 1–1; road: 0–3)

Game	Date	Team	Score	High points	High rebounds	High assists	Location Attendance	Series
1	April 17	@ L.A. Lakers	L 71–72	Steve Francis (18)	Jim Jackson (12)	Steve Francis (5)	Staples Center; 18,997	0–1
2	April 19	@ L.A. Lakers	L 84–98	Yao Ming (21)	Steve Francis (10)	Steve Francis (12)	Staples Center; 18,997	0–2
3	April 23	L.A. Lakers	W 102–91	Steve Francis (27)	Jackson, Yao (10)	Steve Francis (7)	Toyota Center; 18,226	1–2
4	April 25	L.A. Lakers	L 88–92 (OT)	Steve Francis (17)	Jim Jackson (20)	Steve Francis (9)	Toyota Center; 18,219	1–3
5	April 28	@ L.A. Lakers	L 78–97	Jim Jackson (17)	Kelvin Cato (12)	Steve Francis (5)	Staples Center; 18,997	1–4

2004 schedule

== Player statistics ==
Legend
GP	Games played	GS	Games started	MPG	Minutes per game
FG%	Field-goal percentage	3P%	3-point field-goal percentage	FT%	Free-throw percentage
RPG	Rebounds per game	APG	Assists per game	SPG	Steals per game
BPG	Blocks per game	PPG	Points per game

=== Regular season ===
Player	GP	GS	MPG	FG%	3P%	FT%	RPG	APG	SPG	BPG	PPG
Torraye Braggs^{†}	11	0	12.0	.464		.667	3.1	.5	.4	.2	3.1
Kelvin Cato	69	67	25.3	.447		.676	6.8	1.0	.8	1.4	6.1
Alton Ford	9	0	4.6	.545		.500	1.2	.3	.0	.1	1.7
Steve Francis	79	79	40.4	.403	.292	.775	5.5	6.2	1.8	.4	16.6
Adrian Griffin	19	1	7.0	.278	.500	.000	1.0	.5	.4	.1	.6
Jim Jackson	80	80	39.0	.424	.400	.843	6.1	2.8	1.1	.3	12.9
Mark Jackson	42	3	13.7	.340	.171	.718	1.7	2.8	.4	.0	2.5
Yao Ming	82	82	32.8	.522	.000	.809	9.0	1.5	.3	1.9	17.5
Cuttino Mobley	80	80	40.4	.426	.390	.811	4.5	3.2	1.3	.4	15.8
Boštjan Nachbar	45	3	11.5	.356	.365	.724	1.6	.7	.3	.3	3.1
Moochie Norris^{†}	30	0	13.4	.310	.348	.750	1.0	1.6	.5	.1	2.7
Charles Oakley	7	0	3.6	.333		.833	.7	.3	.0	.0	1.3
Scott Padgett	58	5	9.4	.443	.431	.750	2.4	.4	.2	.2	3.4
Eric Piatkowski	49	0	14.3	.377	.352	.875	1.5	.5	.3	.1	4.1
Maurice Taylor	75	10	27.7	.480	.000	.736	5.1	1.4	.6	.6	11.5
Clarence Weatherspoon^{†}	37	0	17.6	.503	.000	.660	4.2	.5	.6	.4	5.6
Mike Wilks	26	0	5.6	.472	.600	.833	.6	.7	.1	.0	1.9

=== Playoffs ===
Player	GP	GS	MPG	FG%	3P%	FT%	RPG	APG	SPG	BPG	PPG
Kelvin Cato	5	5	29.6	.591		.429	6.8	.4	1.0	.8	5.8
Steve Francis	5	5	44.4	.429	.412	.725	8.4	7.6	1.4	.2	19.2
Jim Jackson	5	5	44.2	.397	.276	.667	10.4	2.0	1.0	.2	14.8
Mark Jackson	5	0	7.6	.167	.000		.6	1.0	.4	.0	.4
Yao Ming	5	5	37.0	.456		.765	7.4	1.8	.4	1.4	15.0
Cuttino Mobley	5	5	42.0	.387	.286	.800	4.8	2.8	.6	.6	14.4
Boštjan Nachbar	5	0	8.2	.444	.333	1.000	1.2	.4	.2	.0	2.8
Scott Padgett	4	0	3.5	.400	.333		.8	.0	.3	.3	1.3
Eric Piatkowski	1	0	4.0	.000			1.0	.0	.0	.0	.0
Maurice Taylor	5	0	23.0	.474		.765	3.2	1.0	.0	.2	9.8
Clarence Weatherspoon	2	0	11.0	.400		.500	2.0	.0	.0	.0	3.5
Mike Wilks	2	0	2.5				.0	.5	.0	.0	.0

- ^{†} Denotes player spent time with another team in the season. Stats reflect time with the Rockets only.

== Awards and records ==
- Yao Ming, All-NBA Third Team

== See also ==
- 2003–04 NBA season
