= 2003–04 Memphis Grizzlies season =

- Head coach: Hubie Brown
- President: Jerry West
- General manager: Dick Versace
- Owner: Michael Heisley
- Arena: Pyramid Arena

Results
- Record: 50–32 (.610)
- Place: Division: 4th (Midwest); Conference: 6th (Western)
- Playoff finish: First round (lost to Spurs 0–4)
- Stats at Basketball Reference

The 2003–04 Memphis Grizzlies season was the Grizzlies' ninth season in the National Basketball Association, and their third season in Memphis. It was also the final season playing their home games at the Pyramid Arena. They moved into FedExForum the next season. During the offseason, the Grizzlies signed free agent James Posey. After two unsuccessful seasons ever since they moved to Memphis, the Grizzlies finally played around .500 holding a 9–8 record as they acquired Bonzi Wells from the Portland Trail Blazers in early December. However, the team struggled posting a 7-game losing streak at the end of the month. Despite this, the Grizzlies continued to play their best basketball posting an 8-game winning streak in January, and winning 13 of their 15 games in March, as they made the playoffs for the first time in their franchise history, finishing fourth in the Midwest Division with a 50–32 record.

Pau Gasol continued to lead the team in scoring, rebounds and blocks, and 70-year old head coach Hubie Brown was named Coach of The Year. However, the Grizzlies lost in the first round of the playoffs, losing four games straight to the defending champion San Antonio Spurs.

== Draft picks ==
Round	Pick	Player	Position	Nationality	College
1	13	Marcus Banks	PG	United States	UNLV
1	27	Kendrick Perkins	C	United States	Clifton J. Ozen (HS)

== Roster ==
2003–04 Memphis Grizzlies roster
Players

Pos.	No.	Player	Height	Weight	DOB	From
G/F	31	Shane Battier	6 ft 8 in (2.03 m)	220 lb (100 kg)	1978–09–09	Duke
PG	3	Troy Bell (injured)	6 ft 1 in (1.85 m)	180 lb (82 kg)	1980–11–10	Boston College
F/C	16	Pau Gasol	7 ft 0 in (2.13 m)	250 lb (113 kg)	1980–07–06	Spain
PF	40	Ryan Humphrey	6 ft 8 in (2.03 m)	235 lb (107 kg)	1979–07–24	Notre Dame
SF	30	Dahntay Jones (injured)	6 ft 6 in (1.98 m)	225 lb (102 kg)	1980–12–27	Duke
SG	33	Mike Miller	6 ft 8 in (2.03 m)	218 lb (99 kg)	1980–02–19	Florida
SF	45	Bo Outlaw	6 ft 8 in (2.03 m)	220 lb (100 kg)	1971–04–13	Houston
G/F	41	James Posey	6 ft 8 in (2.03 m)	215 lb (98 kg)	1977–01–13	Xavier
PF	0	Theron Smith	6 ft 8 in (2.03 m)	261 lb (118 kg)	1980–10–03	Ball State
F	4	Stromile Swift	6 ft 9 in (2.06 m)	225 lb (102 kg)	1979–11–21	LSU
C	12	Jake Tsakalidis	7 ft 2 in (2.18 m)	290 lb (132 kg)	1979–06–10	Republic of Georgia
PG	25	Earl Watson	6 ft 1 in (1.85 m)	195 lb (88 kg)	1979–06–12	UCLA
SG	6	Bonzi Wells	6 ft 5 in (1.96 m)	210 lb (95 kg)	1976–09–28	Ball State
PG	2	Jason Williams	6 ft 1 in (1.85 m)	180 lb (82 kg)	1975–11–18	Florida
C	42	Lorenzen Wright	6 ft 11 in (2.11 m)	255 lb (116 kg)	1975–11–04	Memphis

Coaches
Head coach
- Hubie Brown
Assistant(s)
- Tony Barone
- Brendan Brown
- Lionel Hollins
- Hal Wissel

Legend
- (DP) Unsigned draft pick
- (FA) Free agent
- (S) Suspended
- Injured

Roster

== Regular season ==
=== Season standings ===
Midwest Division	W	L	PCT	GB	Home	Road	Div
y-Minnesota Timberwolves	58	24	.707	–	31–10	27–14	14–10
x-San Antonio Spurs	57	25	.695	1	33–8	24–17	15–9
x-Dallas Mavericks	52	30	.634	6	36–5	16–25	14–10
x-Memphis Grizzlies	50	32	.610	8	31–10	19–22	12–12
x-Houston Rockets	45	37	.549	13	27–14	18–23	8–16
x-Denver Nuggets	43	39	.524	15	29–12	14–27	11–13
e-Utah Jazz	42	40	.512	16	28–13	14–27	10–14

#	Western Conference				
#	Team	W	L	PCT	GB
1	c-Minnesota Timberwolves	58	24	.707	–
2	y-Los Angeles Lakers	56	26	.683	2
3	x-San Antonio Spurs	57	25	.695	1
4	x-Sacramento Kings	55	27	.671	3
5	x-Dallas Mavericks	52	30	.634	6
6	x-Memphis Grizzlies	50	32	.610	8
7	x-Houston Rockets	45	37	.549	13
8	x-Denver Nuggets	43	39	.524	15
9	e-Utah Jazz	42	40	.512	16
10	e-Portland Trail Blazers	41	41	.500	17
11	e-Seattle SuperSonics	37	45	.451	21
12	e-Golden State Warriors	37	45	.451	21
13	e-Phoenix Suns	29	53	.354	29
14	e-Los Angeles Clippers	28	54	.341	30

z - clinched division title
y - clinched division title
x - clinched playoff spot

== Playoffs ==
2004 playoff game log
First Round: 0–4 (home: 0–2; road: 0–2)

Game	Date	Team	Score	High points	High rebounds	High assists	Location Attendance	Series
1	April 17	@ San Antonio	L 74–98	Bonzi Wells (16)	Stromile Swift (7)	Jason Williams (3)	SBC Center; 18,797	0–1
2	April 19	@ San Antonio	L 70–87	Pau Gasol (20)	Pau Gasol (11)	Jason Williams (4)	SBC Center; 18,797	0–2
3	April 22	San Antonio	L 93–95	Pau Gasol (18)	Swift, Wright (6)	Gasol, Williams (3)	The Pyramid; 19,351	0–3
4	April 25	San Antonio	L 97–110	Pau Gasol (22)	James Posey (11)	Jason Williams (8)	The Pyramid; 19,351	0–4

2004 schedule

== Player statistics ==
=== Ragular season ===
Player	POS	GP	GS	MP	REB	AST	STL	BLK	PTS	MPG	RPG	APG	SPG	BPG	PPG
James Posey	SG	82	82	2,451	403	122	137	40	1,126	29.9	4.9	1.5	1.7	.5	13.7
Bo Outlaw	PF	82	1	1,606	342	90	73	70	379	19.6	4.2	1.1	.9	.9	4.6
Earl Watson	PG	81	14	1,669	178	402	91	19	460	20.6	2.2	5.0	1.1	.2	5.7
Shane Battier	SF	79	1	1,947	303	101	101	58	669	24.6	3.8	1.3	1.3	.7	8.5
Pau Gasol	PF	78	78	2,458	600	198	44	132	1,381	31.5	7.7	2.5	.6	1.7	17.7
Stromile Swift	PF	77	10	1,528	378	38	56	118	727	19.8	4.9	.5	.7	1.5	9.4
Jason Williams	PG	72	68	2,115	147	492	92	5	782	29.4	2.0	6.8	1.3	.1	10.9
Mike Miller	SF	65	65	1,770	216	232	59	14	722	27.2	3.3	3.6	.9	.2	11.1
Lorenzen Wright	C	65	46	1,674	445	71	45	58	610	25.8	6.8	1.1	.7	.9	9.4
Bonzi Wells^{†}	SG	59	17	1,468	199	104	71	16	728	24.9	3.4	1.8	1.2	.3	12.3
Jake Tsakalidis	C	40	28	533	128	18	9	22	170	13.3	3.2	.5	.2	.6	4.3
Theron Smith	SF	20	0	178	41	7	5	5	44	8.9	2.1	.4	.3	.3	2.2
Dahntay Jones	SG	20	0	154	23	12	5	6	36	7.7	1.2	.6	.3	.3	1.8
Wesley Person^{†}	SG	16	0	284	18	23	5	2	83	17.8	1.1	1.4	.3	.1	5.2
Troy Bell	PG	6	0	34	4	4	1	0	11	5.7	.7	.7	.2	.0	1.8
Ryan Humphrey	PF	2	0	11	3	1	1	0	2	5.5	1.5	.5	.5	.0	1.0

- ^{†} Denotes player spent time with another team in the season. Stats reflect time with the Grizzlies only.

=== Playoffs ===
Player	POS	GP	GS	MP	REB	AST	STL	BLK	PTS	MPG	RPG	APG	SPG	BPG	PPG
Pau Gasol	PF	4	4	134	20	10	4	6	74	33.5	5.0	2.5	1.0	1.5	18.5
James Posey	SG	4	4	130	22	4	9	2	50	32.5	5.5	1.0	2.3	.5	12.5
Jason Williams	PG	4	4	130	9	18	2	0	43	32.5	2.3	4.5	.5	.0	10.8
Lorenzen Wright	C	4	4	100	17	2	4	2	22	25.0	4.3	.5	1.0	.5	5.5
Mike Miller	SF	4	4	98	12	3	5	0	30	24.5	3.0	.8	1.3	.0	7.5
Bonzi Wells	SG	4	0	94	12	4	4	1	47	23.5	3.0	1.0	1.0	.3	11.8
Stromile Swift	PF	4	0	74	19	3	3	6	24	18.5	4.8	.8	.8	1.5	6.0
Shane Battier	SF	4	0	69	12	1	0	1	19	17.3	3.0	.3	.0	.3	4.8
Earl Watson	PG	4	0	62	9	7	5	0	19	15.5	2.3	1.8	1.3	.0	4.8
Bo Outlaw	PF	4	0	61	4	6	2	2	2	15.3	1.0	1.5	.5	.5	.5
Ryan Humphrey	PF	3	0	5	2	0	0	0	2	1.7	.7	.0	.0	.0	.7
Jake Tsakalidis	C	1	0	3	0	0	0	0	2	3.0	.0	.0	.0	.0	2.0

== Awards and records ==
- Hubie Brown, NBA Coach of the Year Award
- Jerry West, NBA Executive of the Year Award

== See also ==
- 2003-04 NBA season
