= 2003–04 Denver Nuggets season =

NBA professional basketball team season

- Head coach: Jeff Bzdelik
- General manager: Kiki VanDeWeghe
- Owner: Stan Kroenke
- Arena: Pepsi Center

Results
- Record: 43–39 (.524)
- Place: Division: 6th (Midwest); Conference: 8th (Western)
- Playoff finish: First round (lost to Timberwolves 1–4)
- Stats at Basketball Reference

Local media
- Television: KTVD; Fox Sports Net Rocky Mountain
- Radio: KKFN

The 2003–04 Denver Nuggets season was the 28th season for the Denver Nuggets in the National Basketball Association, and their 37th season as a franchise. The season saw the team draft future All-Star Carmelo Anthony with the third overall pick in the 2003 NBA draft. During the offseason, the team signed free agent Andre Miller, and re-signed former Nuggets guard Voshon Lenard. Coming off with the worst record of 17–65 the previous season, Anthony led the Nuggets to a fast start winning 13 of their first 19 games. However, the team struggled down the stretch posting losing records in February and March. The Nuggets finished sixth in the Midwest Division with a 43–39 record, and made the playoffs for the first time since 1995. Anthony had a stellar rookie season averaging 21.0 points per game, and being selected to the All-Rookie First Team. He also finished second behind LeBron James of the Cleveland Cavaliers in Rookie of The Year voting.

However, in the first round of the playoffs, the Nuggets lost to the top-seeded Minnesota Timberwolves and league MVP Kevin Garnett in five games.

For the season, the Nuggets changed their logo and uniforms, adding gold and light blue to their color scheme, they remained their primary logo until 2008 their added dark navy blue to their color scheme and remained in used until 2018, while the uniforms they remained in used until 2015.

== NBA draft ==
Round	Pick	Player	Position	Nationality	School/Club team
1	3	Carmelo Anthony	SF	United States	Syracuse
2	46	Sani Bečirović	G	Slovenia	

== Roster ==
2003–04 Denver Nuggets roster
Players

Pos.	No.	Player	Height	Weight	DOB	From
F	12	Chris Andersen	6 ft 10 in (2.08 m)	230 lb (104 kg)	1978–07–07	Blinn
F	15	Carmelo Anthony	6 ft 8 in (2.03 m)	230 lb (104 kg)	1984–05–29	Syracuse
G	20	Jon Barry	6 ft 4 in (1.93 m)	195 lb (88 kg)	1969–07–25	Georgia Tech
F	32	Ryan Bowen	6 ft 7 in (2.01 m)	215 lb (98 kg)	1975–11–20	Iowa
G	11	Earl Boykins	5 ft 5 in (1.65 m)	135 lb (61 kg)	1976–06–02	Eastern Michigan
F/C	23	Marcus Camby	6 ft 11 in (2.11 m)	220 lb (100 kg)	1974–03–22	UMass
C	51	Michael Doleac	6 ft 11 in (2.11 m)	262 lb (119 kg)	1977–06–15	Utah
C	56	Francisco Elson	7 ft 0 in (2.13 m)	235 lb (107 kg)	1976–02–28	California
F/C	31	Nene Hilario	6 ft 11 in (2.11 m)	260 lb (118 kg)	1982–09–13	Brazil
G	1	Voshon Lenard	6 ft 4 in (1.93 m)	205 lb (93 kg)	1973–05–14	Minnesota
G	24	Andre Miller	6 ft 2 in (1.88 m)	200 lb (91 kg)	1976–03–19	Utah
F	41	Mark Pope	6 ft 10 in (2.08 m)	235 lb (107 kg)	1972–09–11	Kentucky
G	4	Jeff Trepagnier	6 ft 4 in (1.93 m)	200 lb (91 kg)	1979–07–11	USC
F	22	Nikoloz Tskitishvili	7 ft 0 in (2.13 m)	225 lb (102 kg)	1983–04–14	Republic of Georgia
F	5	Rodney White	6 ft 9 in (2.06 m)	238 lb (108 kg)	1980–06–28	Charlotte

Coaches
Head coach
- Jeff Bzdelik
Assistant(s)
- John MacLeod
- T.R. Dunn
- Scott Brooks
- Adrian Dantley
- Chip Engelland
- Jarinn Akana
- Bill Branch

Legend
- (DP) Unsigned draft pick
- (FA) Free agent
- (S) Suspended
- Injured

Roster

== Regular season ==
=== Season standings ===
Midwest Division	W	L	PCT	GB	Home	Road	Div
y-Minnesota Timberwolves	58	24	.707	–	31–10	27–14	14–10
x-San Antonio Spurs	57	25	.695	1	33–8	24–17	15–9
x-Dallas Mavericks	52	30	.634	6	36–5	16–25	14–10
x-Memphis Grizzlies	50	32	.610	8	31–10	19–22	12–12
x-Houston Rockets	45	37	.549	13	27–14	18–23	8–16
x-Denver Nuggets	43	39	.524	15	29–12	14–27	11–13
e-Utah Jazz	42	40	.512	16	28–13	14–27	10–14

#	Western Conference				
#	Team	W	L	PCT	GB
1	c-Minnesota Timberwolves	58	24	.707	–
2	y-Los Angeles Lakers	56	26	.683	2
3	x-San Antonio Spurs	57	25	.695	1
4	x-Sacramento Kings	55	27	.671	3
5	x-Dallas Mavericks	52	30	.634	6
6	x-Memphis Grizzlies	50	32	.610	8
7	x-Houston Rockets	45	37	.549	13
8	x-Denver Nuggets	43	39	.524	15
9	e-Utah Jazz	42	40	.512	16
10	e-Portland Trail Blazers	41	41	.500	17
11	e-Seattle SuperSonics	37	45	.451	21
12	e-Golden State Warriors	37	45	.451	21
13	e-Phoenix Suns	29	53	.354	29
14	e-Los Angeles Clippers	28	54	.341	30

=== Game log ===
Game	Date	Opponent	Result	Pacers points	Opponents	Record	Streak	Notes
1								

== Playoffs ==
2004 playoff game log
First round: 1–4 (home: 1–1; road: 0–3)

Game	Date	Team	Score	High points	High rebounds	High assists	Location Attendance	Series
1	April 18	@ Minnesota	L 92–106	Anthony, Camby (19)	Marcus Camby (8)	Earl Boykins (5)	Target Center; 18,503	0–1
2	April 21	@ Minnesota	L 81–95	Voshon Lenard (24)	Carmelo Anthony (9)	Anthony, Nenê (3)	Target Center; 18,101	0–2
3	April 24	Minnesota	W 107–86	Carmelo Anthony (24)	Marcus Camby (16)	Andre Miller (6)	Pepsi Center; 19,713	1–2
4	April 27	Minnesota	L 82–84	Voshon Lenard (28)	Marcus Camby (14)	Marcus Camby (5)	Pepsi Center; 19,694	1–3
5	April 30	@ Minnesota	L 91–102	Camby, Miller (21)	Marcus Camby (15)	Boykins, Lenard (4)	Target Center; 19,890	1–4

2004 schedule

== Player statistics ==
Legend
GP	Games played	GS	Games started	MPG	Minutes per game
FG%	Field-goal percentage	3P%	3-point field-goal percentage	FT%	Free-throw percentage
RPG	Rebounds per game	APG	Assists per game	SPG	Steals per game
BPG	Blocks per game	PPG	Points per game

=== Regular season ===
Player	GP	GS	MPG	FG%	3FG%	FT%	RPG	APG	SPG	BPG	PPG
Carmelo Anthony	82	82	36.5	.426	.322	.777	6.1	2.8	1.2	0.5	21.0
Andre Miller	82	82	34.6	.457	.185	.832	4.5	6.1	1.7	0.3	14.8
Voshon Lenard	73	70	30.6	.422	.367	.791	2.7	2.1	0.8	0.2	14.2
Nenê	77	77	32.5	.530	.000	.682	6.5	2.2	1.5	0.5	11.8
Earl Boykins	82	3	22.5	.419	.322	.877	1.7	3.6	0.6	0.0	10.2
Marcus Camby	72	72	30.0	.477	.000	.721	10.1	1.8	1.2	2.6	8.6
Rodney White	72	0	13.7	.459	.379	.750	2.3	0.8	0.4	0.3	7.5
Jon Barry	57	9	19.3	.404	.370	.845	2.2	2.6	1.0	0.1	6.2
Michael Doleac	26	0	13.2	.412		.875	2.9	0.5	0.2	0.2	3.6
Francisco Elson	62	14	14.1	.472	.000	.667	3.3	0.5	0.6	0.6	3.5
Chris Andersen	71	0	14.5	.443	.000	.589	4.2	0.5	0.5	1.6	3.4
Nikoloz Tskitishvili	39	0	7.9	.328	.273	.793	1.6	0.3	0.2	0.2	2.7
Jeff Trepagnier	11	0	8.7	.263	.500	.500	1.4	0.4	0.3	0.0	2.3
Ryan Bowen	52	1	7.5	.340		.833	1.7	0.3	0.3	0.3	0.9
Mark Pope	4	0	5.0	.500		.000	0.8	0.0	0.3	0.0	0.5

=== Playoffs ===
Player	GP	GS	MPG	FG%	3FG%	FT%	RPG	APG	SPG	BPG	PPG
Voshon Lenard	5	5	32.2	.427	.458	.714	2.6	2.4	0.8	0.0	17.0
Andre Miller	5	5	34.8	.472	.000	.818	4.6	3.2	1.6	0.0	15.4
Carmelo Anthony	4	4	35.8	.328	.182	.800	8.3	2.8	1.3	0.0	15.0
Earl Boykins	5	0	24.2	.444	.357	.857	2.4	3.8	1.0	0.2	13.4
Marcus Camby	5	5	38.8	.491	.500	.571	11.4	2.4	0.8	1.4	12.6
Nenê	5	5	26.4	.444		.538	5.0	3.0	1.0	0.6	7.8
Jon Barry	5	1	20.0	.333	.333	.667	3.6	2.0	0.6	0.0	4.2
Francisco Elson	4	0	15.0	.583		.500	2.3	0.5	0.5	0.3	3.8
Michael Doleac	5	0	9.8	.500			1.4	0.6	0.0	0.0	2.0
Rodney White	4	0	6.5	.267	.000		1.3	0.0	0.5	0.0	2.0
Chris Andersen	5	0	6.8	.333			2.8	0.4	0.2	0.4	1.2
Ryan Bowen	4	0	1.5	1.000			0.0	0.0	0.0	0.0	0.5

Player statistics citation:

== Awards, records, and honors ==
- Carmelo Anthony, NBA All-Rookie Team 1st Team
