= Ryan Bowen =

American basketball player & coach (born 1975)

Grand Rapids Gold
- Title: Head coach
- League: NBA G League

Personal information
- Born: November 20, 1975 (age 50) Fort Madison, Iowa, U.S.
- Listed height: 6 ft 9 in (2.06 m)
- Listed weight: 215 lb (98 kg)

Career information
- High school: Fort Madison (Fort Madison, Iowa)
- College: Iowa (1994–1998)
- NBA draft: 1998: 2nd round, 55th overall pick
- Drafted by: Denver Nuggets
- Playing career: 1998–2009
- Position: Power forward / small forward
- Number: 42, 32, 40
- Coaching career: 2011–present

Career history

Playing
- 1998–1999: Oyak Renault
- 1999–2004: Denver Nuggets
- 2004–2006: Houston Rockets
- 2007: Tau Cerámica
- 2007: Ironi Nahariya
- 2007–2009: New Orleans Hornets
- 2009: Oklahoma City Thunder

Coaching
- 2011–2013: Denver Nuggets (assistant)
- 2013–2015: Sacramento Kings (assistant)
- 2015–2025: Denver Nuggets (assistant)
- 2025–present: Grand Rapids Gold

Career highlights
- As assistant coach: NBA champion (2023)

Career NBA statistics
- Points: 1,319 (2.6 ppg)
- Rebounds: 1,060 (2.1 rpg)
- Assists: 250 (0.5 apg)
- Stats at NBA.com
- Stats at Basketball Reference

Ryan Cleo Bowen (born November 20, 1975) is an American former professional basketball player who currently serves as the head coach for the Grand Rapids Gold of the NBA G League. He was a 6'9", 218 lb (99 kg) power forward.

== College career ==
Bowen played college basketball at the University of Iowa, where he finished in the top 10 of career blocks and rebounds, and continues to hold the record in career steals. In his senior year at Iowa, Bowen averaged 14.4 points, 8.7 rebounds, and 2.5 assists per game.

== Professional career ==
=== Europe ===
Bowen was a second-round draft pick of the Denver Nuggets in the 1998 NBA draft, but he played his rookie season at Oyak Renault in the Turkish Basketball League before joining the Nuggets in 1999.

In January 2007, after being released by the Rockets, he was signed by TAU Cerámica to a two-month deal in advance of the Euroleague top 16, in which they had already secured a top seed. The team has the option to extend the contract through the end of the European season. Because of an injury he left Spain and in March 2007, he signed with Ironi Naharia of the Israel Premier League. During his stay with the team, he kept a blog of his experiences in Israel. He was waived in May 2007 by Naharia.

=== Denver Nuggets / Houston Rockets ===
After his stint on Turkey, he signed with the Nuggets in 1999. and played five seasons there before being picked up by the Houston Rockets. After two seasons with Houston, Bowen was released before the 2006–07 NBA season began.

=== New Orleans Hornets ===
In the 2007 NBA offseason, Bowen signed with the New Orleans Hornets as a free agent.

=== Oklahoma City Thunder ===
In the 2009 NBA offseason, Bowen was a non-roster invite with the Oklahoma City Thunder and after training camp was offered a one-year contract. He was waived on November 25, 2009.

== Post-playing career ==
Shortly after retiring from the NBA, Ryan returned to Iowa City to become the video coordinator for the University of Iowa shortly after Fran McCaffery took over. After spending a year plus in Iowa City working for the Hawkeyes, Ryan was hired as an assistant coach by the Denver Nuggets in December 2011. On August 21, 2013, Bowen was hired as an assistant coach and assistant director of player development by the Sacramento Kings. In July 2015, Bowen returned to the Denver Nuggets as an assistant following Denver's hire of Michael Malone as the head coach; he worked for Malone in Sacramento. Bowen coached the Denver Nuggets 2022 Summer League team. Bowen won his first NBA championship in 2023 when the Nuggets defeated the Miami Heat in 5 games.

On August 6, 2025, Bowen was announced as the head coach for the Grand Rapids Gold, Denver's G League affiliate.

== Off the court ==
Ryan Bowen has an older brother and an older sister, and has a daughter and two sons with his wife Wendy. He was awarded the Chopper Travaglini Award for his work in the Denver community, and has established the Ryan Bowen Family Foundation to help sponsor youth athletics, athletic facilities and college scholarships for children in southeastern Iowa and Denver, Colorado. The foundation also sponsors the "Floor Burns" basketball camp, which is held every summer in Iowa.

== NBA career statistics ==
Legend
GP	Games played	GS	Games started	MPG	Minutes per game
FG%	Field goal percentage	3P%	3-point field goal percentage	FT%	Free throw percentage
RPG	Rebounds per game	APG	Assists per game	SPG	Steals per game
BPG	Blocks per game	PPG	Points per game	**Bold**	Career high

=== Regular season ===
Year	Team	GP	GS	MPG	FG%	3P%	FT%	RPG	APG	SPG	BPG	PPG
1999–00	Denver	52	0	11.3	.393	.111	.717	2.2	.4	.8	.3	2.5
2000–01	Denver	57	0	12.2	.556	.364	.614	2.0	.5	.6	.2	3.4
2001–02	Denver	**75**	21	**22.5**	.479	.083	.750	**4.0**	.7	**1.0**	**.5**	**4.9**
2002–03	Denver	62	**31**	16.1	.492	.286	.659	2.5	**.9**	**1.0**	**.5**	3.6
2003–04	Denver	52	1	7.5	.340	.000	.833	1.7	.3	.3	.3	.9
2004–05	Houston	66	6	9.2	.423	**.500**	.667	1.2	.3	.3	.1	1.7
2005–06	Houston	68	19	9.6	.298	.136	.786	1.3	.4	.3	.1	1.3
2007–08	New Orleans	53	4	12.5	.490	.000	.552	1.9	.5	.6	.2	2.2
2008–09	New Orleans	21	3	10.4	.579	.000	.600	1.1	.4	.7	.2	2.2
2009–10	Oklahoma City	1	0	8.0	**1.000**	.000	**1.000**	2.0	.0	**1.0**	.0	4.0
Career		507	85	12.8	.456	.206	.693	2.1	.5	.6	.3	2.6

=== Playoffs ===
Year	Team	GP	GS	MPG	FG%	3P%	FT%	RPG	APG	SPG	BPG	PPG
2004	Denver	4	0	1.5	**1.000**	.000	.000	.0	.0	.0	.0	.5
2005	Houston	7	**3**	**17.9**	.320	.000	.667	**2.0**	**.9**	**.9**	.0	**2.6**
2008	New Orleans	**9**	0	4.3	.167	.000	**1.000**	1.6	.2	.1	.0	.4
2009	New Orleans	1	0	2.0	.000	.000	.000	.0	.0	.0	.0	.0
Career		21	3	8.2	.303	.000	.800	1.3	.4	.3	.0	1.1
