= Josh A. Moore =

American basketball player (born 1980)

Personal information
- Born: November 16, 1980 (age 45) Newark, New Jersey, U.S.
- Listed height: 7 ft 2 in (2.18 m)
- Listed weight: 317 lb (144 kg)

Career information
- College: University of Michigan
- NBA draft: 2004: undrafted
- Playing career: 2004–present
- Position: Center

Josh Moore (born November 16, 1980, in Newark, New Jersey) is an American professional basketball player and actor. Moore played professional basketball in the National Basketball Association (NBA) for the Los Angeles Clippers, in China and Iran. He played college basketball for the Michigan Wolverines.

Moore was listed at 7 ft 2 in (2.18 m), 317 lb (144 kg), and is a cousin of Shaquille O'Neal.

== Early life and education ==
Moore attended St. Thomas More School in Oakdale, Connecticut, graduating in 1999.

He ranked 26th overall in the ABCD Camp 1999 senior class rankings and the fourth best low post player in the country. Moore was consistently ranked among the top 50 prep players in the country by amateur ranking publications. He played under coach Bob Hurley at St. Anthony High School in Jersey City, New Jersey, for three seasons, where he won a USA Today high school basketball national championship in 1996 and was a two time New Jersey boys' basketball All State selection.

He finished his high school career at St. Thomas More School, where he averaged 19 points and 10 rebounds in his senior campaign on his way to receiving a McDonald's high school basketball All American nomination. He attended summer school at Christopher Robin Academy, an unaccredited school, prior to enrolling at the University of Michigan in 2000.

== Collegiate career ==
Moore attended the University of Michigan from 2000 until 2002. Contrary to reports, Moore was never enrolled in any other academic institutions prior to attending the University of Michigan. Moore had previously made verbal commitments to UCLA and Rutgers before deciding on Michigan.

In his Freshman year (2000–01), Moore started five games, and averaged 4.4 points and 2.7 rebounds in 11.8 minutes a contest. In his Sophomore year (2001–02), he averaged 5.7 points and 3.0 rebounds in 11.3 minutes per contest.

Moore was unable to find his form at the collegiate level, consistently finding himself in foul trouble due to unfavorable match-ups against undersized post players during his freshman season. Perimeter-focused offenses and guard-oriented coaching styles were also contributing factors to his ineffectiveness at the collegiate level. As a sophomore, Moore was hampered by a severe herniated disc in his lower back caused during weight training.

== Professional career ==
Moore played in China during the 2002–03 season with Zhejiang Horses, where he averaged 23 points and 12 rebounds per game. He declared for the 2003 NBA draft in May 2003. He signed a free agent contract with the Los Angeles Clippers in July 2003 and was released in October 2004. Due to NBA active roster rules and constant injuries, Moore spent the entire 2003-04 NBA season on the injured reserve list.

== Filmography ==
- Ball Don't Lie (2007)
- The Business (2007)

== Sources ==
- Moore works hard to impress Michigan fans.
- ESPN article on Michigan coaching changes
- Ed Martin scandal
- Moore Myths
- NBA correspondent Elie Seckbach interviews Josh Moore
- A Place Where Hoop Dreams Come True
- 49% of Michigan fans think Moore should have surgery.
- Moore to UCLA
- Top newcomers
- Interview with Josh Moore
