= Eric Piatkowski =

American basketball player (born 1970)

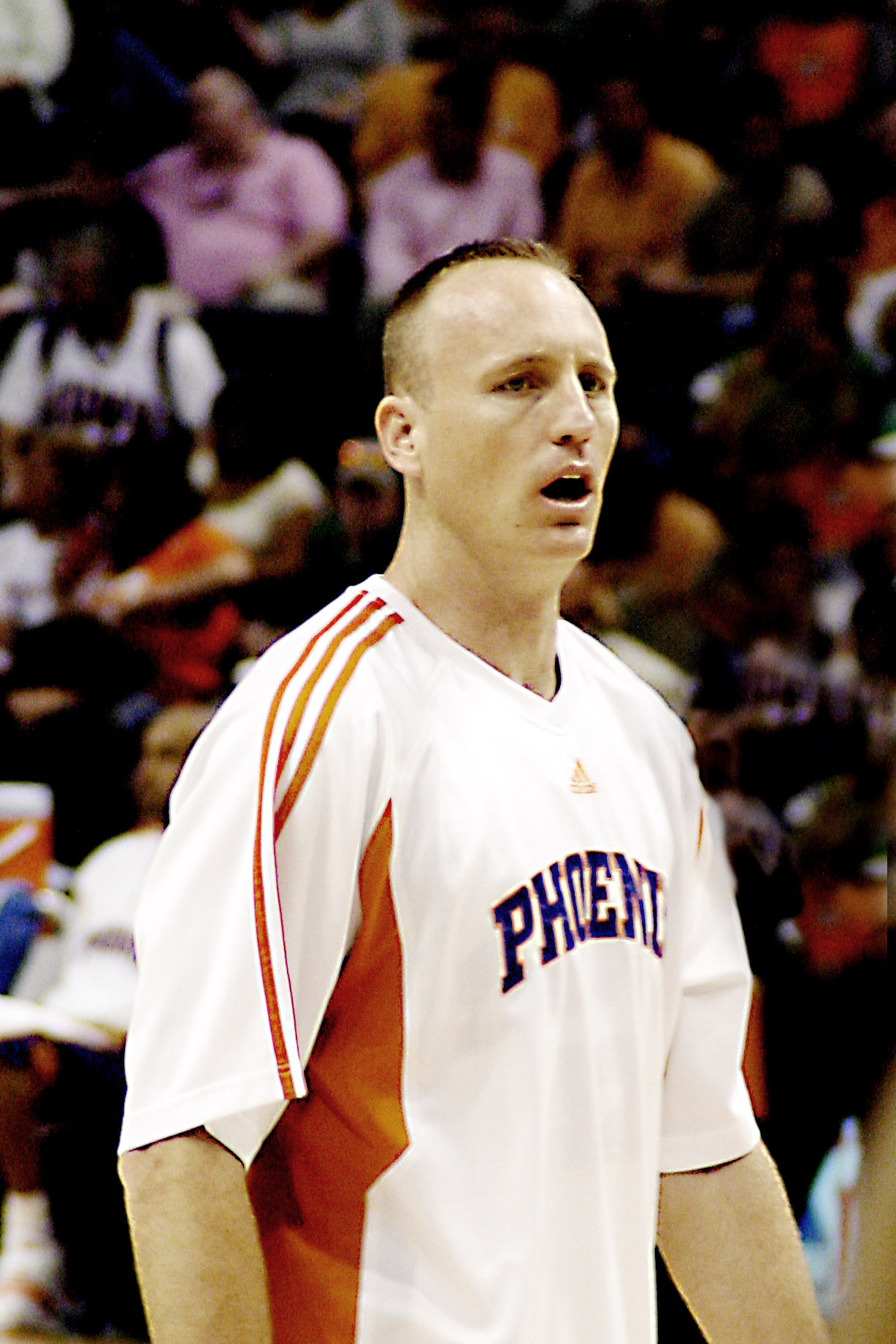

Personal information
- Born: September 30, 1970 (age 56) Steubenville, Ohio, U.S.
- Listed height: 6 ft 7 in (2.01 m)
- Listed weight: 215 lb (98 kg)

Career information
- High school: Stevens (Rapid City, South Dakota)
- College: Nebraska (1990–1994)
- NBA draft: 1994: 1st round, 15th overall pick
- Drafted by: Indiana Pacers
- Playing career: 1994–2008
- Position: Shooting guard / small forward
- Number: 52

Career history
- 1994–2003: Los Angeles Clippers
- 2003–2004: Houston Rockets
- 2004–2006: Chicago Bulls
- 2006–2008: Phoenix Suns

Career highlights
- 2× First-team All-Big Eight (1993, 1994); No. 52 retired by Nebraska Cornhuskers

Career NBA statistics
- Points: 5,919 (7.5 ppg)
- Rebounds: 1,716 (2.2 rpg)
- Assists: 778 (1.0 apg)
- Stats at NBA.com
- Stats at Basketball Reference
Medals
Men's basketball
Representing United States
Summer Universiade
Gold medal – first place	1993 Buffalo	National team

Eric Todd Piatkowski (/ˌpaɪ.ətˈkaʊski/; born September 30, 1970) is an American former professional basketball player in the National Basketball Association (NBA). He played college basketball for the Nebraska Cornhuskers. He is the son of former ABA player Walt Piatkowski.

== High school career ==
Piatkowski attended Rapid City Stevens High School and was a student and a standout in basketball. In basketball, as a senior, he led his team to the 1989 South Dakota Class AA State Championship, was an All-State selection, and was named the Mr. Basketball for the State of South Dakota.

== College career ==
Piatkowski played at the University of Nebraska–Lincoln for coach Danny Nee from 1990 to 1994. He was a member of the All Big Eight Freshman team in 1991 and was honorable mention All Big Eight his freshman and sophomore seasons. Piatkowski was a first team All-Big Eight pick by the Associated Press his junior year and averaged a team high 16.7 points per game. He averaged 21.5 points per game his senior season and was named to the All Big Eight team again. He also led the Cornhuskers to the Big Eight Conference Tournament Championship game while scoring a collegiate high and NU single game record 42 points against Oklahoma in the semi-finals. They went on to defeat Oklahoma State in the finals and he secured tournament MVP honors. That helped earn them the sixth seed in the NCAA Tournament. However Piatkowski's team lost to the eleventh seeded Penn Quakers in the opening round. He was recognized as an honorable mention All-American by the Associated Press and finished his collegiate career with 1,934 career points, behind only Dave Hoppen for the most in school history. His jersey at Nebraska (No. 52) was retired in 2006.

== NBA career ==
After completing his eligibility at the University of Nebraska–Lincoln, Piatkowski was drafted by the Indiana Pacers with the 15th pick of the 1994 NBA draft. The Pacers immediately dealt his draft rights, along with Pooh Richardson and Malik Sealy, to the Los Angeles Clippers for Mark Jackson and the draft rights to Greg Minor. He ended his Clipper career as the franchise leader in games played (616), 3-point field goals made (738) and 3-point field goal attempts (1,835) and free throw percentage (.880%).

After nine seasons with the Clippers he signed as an unrestricted free agent with the Houston Rockets before the 2003–04 season. Piatkowski became a Bull on September 8, 2004, when Houston sent him, Adrian Griffin and Mike Wilks to Chicago in exchange for Dikembe Mutombo. On July 13, 2006, Piatkowski officially signed with the Phoenix Suns, agreeing on a two-year, $2.4 million deal. In April 2014 Piatkowski's group was attempting to buy the L.A. Clippers from embattled owner Donald T Sterling, before Steve Ballmer bought the team outright.

== Career highlights and trivia ==
- He played for the US in the World Basketball games in 1993.
- On February 16, 2002, he set a career high of 36 points against the Dallas Mavericks.
- He set the Clippers individual season record for three-point percentage at .466 which ranked him third in the NBA that season. (2001-02)
- Nicknamed "Pike" and "The Polish Rifle" for his surname and three-point shooting accuracy.
- The first third generation pro basketball player, his dad Walt played four seasons, and grandad Joe played in the 1950s.
- Holds three L.A. Clippers all time records, free throw percentage, three point shooting percentage and most games played for the franchise in L.A.
- Had his number 52 retired by the University of Nebraska–Lincoln.
- Beginning in the 2008–2009 season, Piatkowski became the color analyst on Fox Sports Midwest for the Nebraska men's basketball team.

== NBA career statistics ==
Legend
GP	Games played	GS	Games started	MPG	Minutes per game
FG%	Field goal percentage	3P%	3-point field goal percentage	FT%	Free throw percentage
RPG	Rebounds per game	APG	Assists per game	SPG	Steals per game
BPG	Blocks per game	PPG	Points per game	**Bold**	Career high

=== Regular season ===
Year	Team	GP	GS	MPG	FG%	3P%	FT%	RPG	APG	SPG	BPG	PPG
1994–95	L.A. Clippers	**81**	11	14.9	.441	.374	.783	1.6	1.0	.5	**.2**	7.0
1995–96	L.A. Clippers	65	1	12.1	.405	.333	.817	1.6	.7	.4	**.2**	4.6
1996–97	L.A. Clippers	65	0	11.5	.450	.425	.821	1.6	.8	.5	**.2**	6.0
1997–98	L.A. Clippers	67	35	26.0	.452	.409	.824	**3.5**	1.3	.8	**.2**	**11.3**
1998–99	L.A. Clippers	49	38	25.3	.432	.394	.863	2.9	1.1	**.9**	.1	10.5
1999–00	L.A. Clippers	75	23	22.8	.415	.383	.850	3.0	1.1	.6	**.2**	8.7
2000–01	L.A. Clippers	**81**	40	**26.5**	.433	.404	.873	3.0	1.2	.6	**.2**	10.6
2001–02	L.A. Clippers	71	**64**	24.2	.439	**.466**	.894	2.6	**1.6**	.6	**.2**	8.8
2002–03	L.A. Clippers	62	26	21.9	**.471**	.398	.828	2.5	1.1	.5	.1	9.7
2003–04	Houston	49	0	14.3	.377	.352	.875	1.5	.5	.3	.1	4.1
2004–05	Chicago	68	11	12.4	.430	.425	.804	1.2	.8	.4	.0	4.8
2005–06	Chicago	29	1	7.9	.393	.273	.400	.8	.4	.2	.0	2.0
2006–07	Phoenix	11	0	6.6	.360	.389	**1.000**	.8	.4	.0	.1	2.5
2007–08	Phoenix	16	0	7.1	.364	.423	**1.000**	.8	.6	.0	.1	2.4
Career		789	250	18.5	.434	.399	.839	2.2	1.0	.5	.1	7.5

=== Playoffs ===
Year	Team	GP	GS	MPG	FG%	3P%	FT%	RPG	APG	SPG	BPG	PPG
1997	L.A. Clippers	3	0	12.7	.364	**.400**	.857	.7	.0	.3	.0	**5.3**
2004	Houston	1	0	4.0	.000	.000	.000	1.0	.0	.0	.0	.0
2005	Chicago	5	0	**13.2**	.316	.385	.857	**1.8**	**.6**	**.8**	**.2**	4.6
2006	Chicago	**6**	0	4.7	.500	**.400**	**1.000**	.8	.2	.0	**.2**	1.7
2007	Phoenix	1	0	3.0	**1.000**	.000	.000	.0	.0	.0	.0	2.0
2008	Phoenix	1	0	2.0	.000	.000	.000	.0	.0	.0	.0	.0
Career		17	0	8.3	.368	.391	.875	1.0	.2	.3	.1	3.0
