= 2003–04 Chicago Bulls season =

NBA professional basketball team season

- Head coach: Bill Cartwright (fired); Pete Myers (interim); Scott Skiles
- General manager: John Paxson
- Owner: Jerry Reinsdorf
- Arena: United Center

Results
- Record: 23–59 (.280)
- Place: Division: 8th (Central); Conference: 14th (Eastern)
- Playoff finish: Did not qualify
- Stats at Basketball Reference

Local media
- Television: Fox Sports Net Chicago; WGN; WCIU
- Radio: WMVP

The 2003–04 Chicago Bulls season was the Bulls' 38th season in the National Basketball Association. During the offseason, the Bulls re-signed free agent and former forward Scottie Pippen. However, they continued to struggle finishing last place in the Central Division with a 23–59 record, missing the playoffs for the sixth straight season. Following the season, Pippen retired and Jamal Crawford was traded to the New York Knicks. (See 2003–04 Chicago Bulls season#Regular season)

== Offseason ==
- July 20, 2003: Signed F Scottie Pippen"Scottie Pippen re-signs with the Bulls". NBA.com. July 20, 2003.
- August 20, 2003: Signed G Kendall Gill
- September 4, 2003: Bought out contract of C Dalibor Bagaric
- October 23, 2003: Waived G Trenton Hassell

== NBA draft ==
Round	Pick	Player	Position	Nationality	College / Club Team
1	7	Kirk Hinrich	PG	United States	Kansas
2	36	Mario Austin	F	United States	Mississippi State
2	45	Matt Bonner	F	United States	Florida
2	53	Tommy Smith	F	United States	Arizona State

== Roster ==
2003–04 Chicago Bulls roster
Players

Pos.	No.	Player	Height	Weight	DOB	From
F/C	3	Tyson Chandler	7 ft 1 in (2.16 m)	235 lb (107 kg)	1982-10-02	Dominguez HS (CA)
G	1	Jamal Crawford	6 ft 6 in (1.98 m)	185 lb (84 kg)	1980-03-20	Michigan
F/C	2	Eddy Curry	6 ft 11 in (2.11 m)	285 lb (129 kg)	1982-12-05	Thornwood HS (IL)
F/C	34	Antonio Davis	6 ft 9 in (2.06 m)	245 lb (111 kg)	1968-10-31	UTEP
F	20	Ronald Dupree	6 ft 7 in (2.01 m)	209 lb (95 kg)	1981-01-26	LSU
F	21	Marcus Fizer	6 ft 9 in (2.06 m)	262 lb (119 kg)	1978-08-10	Iowa State
G	13	Kendall Gill (injured)	6 ft 5 in (1.96 m)	195 lb (88 kg)	1968-05-25	Illinois
G	12	Kirk Hinrich	6 ft 3 in (1.91 m)	190 lb (86 kg)	1981-01-02	Kansas
F	6	Chris Jefferies	6 ft 8 in (2.03 m)	225 lb (102 kg)	1980-02-13	Fresno State
F	8	Linton Johnson	6 ft 8 in (2.03 m)	205 lb (93 kg)	1980-06-13	Tulane
G	15	Jannero Pargo	6 ft 1 in (1.85 m)	175 lb (79 kg)	1979-10-22	Arkansas
F	33	Scottie Pippen (injured)	6 ft 7 in (2.01 m)	210 lb (95 kg)	1965-09-25	Central Arkansas
F	32	Eddie Robinson	6 ft 8 in (2.03 m)	210 lb (95 kg)	1976-04-19	Central Oklahoma
F	45	Paul Shirley (injured)	6 ft 10 in (2.08 m)	230 lb (104 kg)	1977-12-23	Iowa State
G	22	Jay Williams (injured)	6 ft 2 in (1.88 m)	195 lb (88 kg)	1981-09-10	Duke
F	11	Jerome Williams	6 ft 9 in (2.06 m)	206 lb (93 kg)	1973-05-10	Georgetown

Coaches
Head coach
- Bill Cartwright (fired)
- Pete Myers (interim)
- Scott Skiles
Assistant(s)
- Ron Adams
- Johnny Bach
- Mike Wilhelm
- Fred Tedeschi (trainer)

Legend
- (DP) Unsigned draft pick
- (FA) Free agent
- (S) Suspended
- Injured

Roster
Updated: March 15, 2004

=== Roster notes ===
- Point guard Jay Williams missed the entire season due to a dislocated left knee from a motorcycle accident.

== Regular season ==
Heading in to the season, Bulls fans were as optimistic as they had been in years. Before it was done, however, winds of change had blown through the Windy City leaving a roster and a coaching staff upside down.

After closing out the previous season with four solid wins in the final six games to reach the 30–victory plateau, the team was hopeful of reaching the playoffs for the first time since 1998 and new pieces were added to the team's puzzle for that to happen.

First, Kirk Hinrich was taken with the seventh overall pick in the 2003 NBA draft to fill the void at the guard spot. This happened just days after the team learned it would be without services of Jay Williams, who was injured in a motorcycle accident in June and would miss this entire season.

Later in the summer, the Bulls signed free agent Scottie Pippen, a seven-time NBA All-Star, two-time Olympic gold medalist, and member of the NBA 50th Anniversary Team, returning him to Chicago on July 20, 2003.

“I think I know how to win games in the NBA. It may sound simple, but both winning and losing can become a mindset, and I won’t accept losing—ever. Whether it’s on the floor, in the huddle, at practice or just demonstrating a winning leadership, I plan on helping this team win,” said Pippen.

Just one month into the season, however, it became clear that expectations were not being met and changes were necessary. With a 4–10 record, the team relieved Bill Cartwright of his head coaching duties (11/24/03). A few days later, Scott Skiles was named head coach (11/28/03) as he set out to instill a tough, defensive-minded, and high-effort mentality upon his new team.

The Bulls makeover wasn't done yet. A blockbuster of a deal went down on 12/01/03, when Chicago traded Lonny Baxter, Donyell Marshall and Jalen Rose to Toronto for Antonio Davis, Chris Jefferies and Jerome Williams.

“This trade helps us address a couple of different areas, areas that we needed to get stronger in. It not only provides us with size, but also with energy,” said John Paxson.

While the Bulls continued to struggle, improvements in effort under Coach Skiles were evident, and the roster re-make had only begun. The team's 23–59 record qualified it for a sixth consecutive NBA Draft Lottery appearance.

Other Notes: Hired Assistant Coaches Johnny Bach (07/15/03) and Ron Adams (07/16/03) ... snapped a 26-game road losing streak versus Western Conference teams with a 95–79 win at Utah (02/04/04) ... Hinrich dished out 506 assists and his average of 6.7 apg ranked tied for 7th in the NBA, despite the Bulls ranking last in the league in team field goal percentage (.414) ... Hinrich was the only rookie in the NBA to tally a triple–double when he registered 11 points, 12 rebounds and 10 assists against the visiting Golden State Warriors (02/28/04) ... Jamal Crawford went for a career–high 50 points (18–34 FG, 8–11 FT) at Toronto (04/11).

Honors: Kirk Hinrich (freshman team) participated in the Schick Rookie Challenge at All-Star Weekend ... Hinrich also was named to the got milk? NBA All-Rookie First Team ... the Bulls drew an average of 19,736 fans through 41 home games (third in the NBA), including 11 sellouts ... the Bulls also hosted the seven largest crowds in the NBA, including a season-high draw of 23,067 versus the L.A. Lakers at the United Center.

=== Standings ===
Central Division	W	L	PCT	GB	Home	Road	Div
y-Indiana Pacers	61	21	.744	–	34–7	27–14	20–8
x-Detroit Pistons	54	28	.659	7	31–10	23–18	17–11
x-New Orleans Hornets	41	41	.500	20	25–16	16–25	14–14
x-Milwaukee Bucks	41	41	.500	20	27–14	14–27	15–13
e-Cleveland Cavaliers	35	47	.427	26	23–18	12–29	14–14
e-Toronto Raptors	33	49	.402	28	18–23	15–26	11–17
e-Atlanta Hawks	28	54	.341	33	18–23	10–31	10–18
e-Chicago Bulls	23	59	.280	38	14–27	9–32	11–17

#	Eastern Conference				
#	Team	W	L	PCT	GB
1	z-Indiana Pacers	61	21	.744	–
2	y-New Jersey Nets	47	35	.573	14
3	x-Detroit Pistons	54	28	.659	7
4	x-Miami Heat	42	40	.512	19
5	x-New Orleans Hornets	41	41	.500	20
6	x-Milwaukee Bucks	41	41	.500	20
7	x-New York Knicks	39	43	.476	22
8	x-Boston Celtics	36	46	.439	25
9	e-Cleveland Cavaliers	35	47	.427	26
10	e-Toronto Raptors	33	49	.402	28
11	e-Philadelphia 76ers	33	49	.402	28
12	e-Atlanta Hawks	28	54	.341	33
13	e-Washington Wizards	25	57	.305	36
14	e-Chicago Bulls	23	59	.280	38
15	e-Orlando Magic	21	61	.256	40

== Player statistics ==
Legend
GP	Games played	GS	Games started	MPG	Minutes per game
FG%	Field-goal percentage	3P%	3-point field-goal percentage	FT%	Free-throw percentage
RPG	Rebounds per game	APG	Assists per game	SPG	Steals per game
BPG	Blocks per game	PPG	Points per game

=== Regular season ===
Player	GP	GS	MPG	FG%	3P%	FT%	RPG	APG	SPG	BPG	PPG
Lonny Baxter^{†}	14	1	10.5	.551	1.000	.625	2.5	.4	.1	.4	4.3
Corie Blount^{†}	46	3	16.4	.471	.000	.542	4.5	1.0	.8	.4	4.5
Rick Brunson^{†}	37	0	10.9	.376	.478	.871	1.0	2.2	.7	.1	3.1
Tyson Chandler	35	8	22.3	.424	.000	.669	7.7	.7	.5	1.2	6.1
Jamal Crawford	80	73	35.1	.386	.317	.833	3.5	5.1	1.4	.4	17.3
Eddy Curry	73	63	29.5	.496	1.000	.671	6.2	.9	.3	1.1	14.7
Antonio Davis^{†}	65	64	31.3	.407		.768	8.1	1.9	.4	.9	8.9
Ronald Dupree	47	8	19.0	.394	.444	.629	3.6	1.2	.7	.4	6.2
Marcus Fizer	46	2	16.0	.383	.118	.750	4.4	.9	.3	.2	7.8
Kendall Gill	56	35	25.2	.392	.237	.735	3.4	1.6	1.2	.3	9.6
Kirk Hinrich	76	66	35.6	.386	.390	.804	3.4	6.8	1.3	.3	12.0
Chris Jefferies^{†}	19	2	9.8	.364	.410	.632	1.5	.3	.2	.4	4.0
Linton Johnson	41	20	17.9	.355	.212	.595	4.5	.7	.9	.8	4.2
Donyell Marshall^{†}	16	8	25.5	.419	.407	.700	6.2	1.8	.8	1.3	8.7
Roger Mason Jr.^{†}	3	0	14.3	.091	.167		1.0	1.0	.3	.0	1.0
Jannero Pargo^{†}	13	1	26.5	.429	.377	.852	2.1	3.6	.5	.4	13.5
Scottie Pippen	23	6	17.9	.379	.271	.630	3.0	2.2	.9	.4	5.9
Eddie Robinson	51	4	20.1	.482	.200	.651	2.0	1.1	.6	.2	6.7
Jalen Rose^{†}	16	14	33.1	.375	.426	.765	4.0	3.5	.8	.3	13.3
Paul Shirley	7	0	12.3	.435	.000	.333	2.3	.6	.1	.1	3.0
Jerome Williams^{†}	53	32	23.2	.466	.000	.675	6.5	1.2	1.3	.1	6.5

- ^{†} Denotes player spent time with another team in the season. Stats reflect time with the Bulls only.

== Awards and records ==
- Kirk Hinrich, NBA All-Rookie Team 1st Team

== See also ==
- 2003–04 NBA season
