= 2001 NBA Finals =

2001 basketball championship series

Team	Coach	Wins
Los Angeles Lakers	Phil Jackson	4
Philadelphia 76ers	Larry Brown	1
- Dates: June 6–15
- MVP: Shaquille O'Neal (Los Angeles Lakers)
- Hall of Famers: Lakers: Kobe Bryant (2020); Shaquille O'Neal (2016); 76ers: Allen Iverson (2016); Dikembe Mutombo (2015); Coaches: Larry Brown (2002); Phil Jackson (2007); Tex Winter (2011); Officials: Dick Bavetta (2015); Danny Crawford (2025); Hugh Evans (2022)
- Eastern finals: 76ers defeated Bucks, 4–3
- Western finals: Lakers defeated Spurs, 4–0

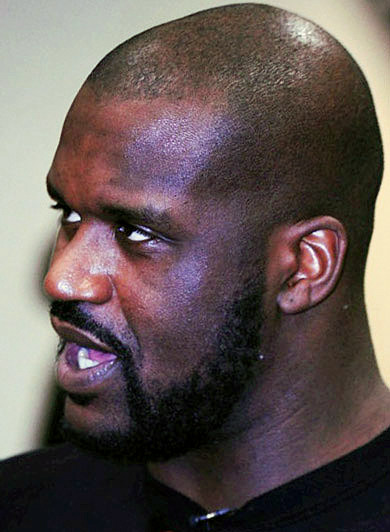
Shaquille O'Neal is the first Los Angeles Lakers player to win two consecutive NBA Finals Most Valuable Player Awards (2001).

The 2001 NBA Finals was the championship series of the National Basketball Association's (NBA) 2000–01 season, and the conclusion of the season's playoffs. The defending NBA champion and Western Conference champion Los Angeles Lakers took on the Eastern Conference champion Philadelphia 76ers for the championship, with the Lakers holding home-court advantage via the better record against the opposite conference tiebreaker in a best-of-seven format. After losing the first game at home, the Lakers won the next four games to clinch their second consecutive title and thirteenth overall.

By the end of the series, the 2000–01 Lakers held the record for the best postseason record with 15–1. It was later surpassed after the NBA extended the first round series to a best-of-seven series by the 2016–17 Golden State Warriors. Lakers center Shaquille O'Neal was named the NBA Finals Most Valuable Player (MVP) for the second consecutive year, after outstanding performances averaging 33.0 points, 15.8 rebounds, and 3.4 blocks per game.

== Background ==
The Los Angeles Lakers entered the 2000–01 NBA season as the defending NBA champions. The club lost a few players to free agency, but they signed veteran players like Isaiah Rider and Horace Grant. The Lakers began the season struggling on and off the court, as they were losing games at the beginning with the Shaq–Kobe feud. Injuries also riddled the team as they struggled through the season. But by April 1, 2001, the Lakers last loss was to the New York Knicks and they never looked back as the team closed out the season on an eight-game winning streak, thus finishing the season 56-26 and closing out as the number 2 seed in the West behind the San Antonio Spurs.

The Lakers began the 2001 NBA playoffs versus the team against whom they played the previous year in the Western Conference finals, the Portland Trail Blazers. The Trail Blazers were a team that struggled throughout the season but battled back to claim the 7th seed. The series wasn't close, as the Lakers swept the Trail Blazers by double digits in all three games. In the semifinals the Lakers took on the Sacramento Kings, a team who had also given the Lakers a tough series the previous season, but the Lakers took two close games at home and went to Sacramento to finish the Kings off with a 4–0 sweep as well. In the conference finals the Lakers went up against the number 1 seed San Antonio Spurs, who were expected to be more competitive than the Lakers' previous opponents. But the Lakers took games 1 and 2 in San Antonio, and then blew them out in games 3 and 4 in Los Angeles in another complete sweep as they became the second team in NBA history to sweep the conference playoffs at 11–0, the 1988–1989 Los Angeles Lakers being the first.

The Lakers met a snag on their quest to the first NBA sweep in playoff history as they went up against Allen Iverson and the Philadelphia 76ers. The 76ers, seeded number 1 in the Eastern Conference, had just come out of two straight seven-game series against the Toronto Raptors and Milwaukee Bucks. The Lakers held home-court advantage over the 76ers, with whom they had an identical regular-season record and split two regular-season matchups, on the tiebreaker of having a better record against teams in the opposite conference. Despite this, during the first game, the trio of Iverson, Dikembe Mutombo and Eric Snow, coming hot off a long Eastern Conference championship road, beat the Lakers in overtime, showcasing their endurance.

The Lakers then took Game 2. Afterwards, Kobe Bryant was quoted as saying he was coming to Philadelphia to cut their hearts out. The Sixers dropped all three games in Philadelphia, giving the Lakers their second straight championship.

=== Road to the Finals ===
Los Angeles Lakers (Western Conference champion)		Philadelphia 76ers (Eastern Conference champion)
Western Conference: # / Team / W / L / PCT / GB; 1 / z-San Antonio Spurs / 58 / 24 / .707 / –; 2 / y-Los Angeles Lakers / 56 / 26 / .683 / 2; 3 / x-Sacramento Kings / 55 / 27 / .671 / 3; 4 / x-Utah Jazz / 53 / 29 / .646 / 5; 5 / x-Dallas Mavericks / 53 / 29 / .646 / 5; 6 / x-Phoenix Suns / 51 / 31 / .622 / 7; 7 / x-Portland Trail Blazers / 50 / 32 / .610 / 8; 8 / x-Minnesota Timberwolves / 47 / 35 / .573 / 11; 9 / e-Houston Rockets / 45 / 37 / .549 / 13; 10 / e-Seattle SuperSonics / 44 / 38 / .537 / 14; 11 / e-Denver Nuggets / 40 / 42 / .488 / 18; 12 / e-Los Angeles Clippers / 31 / 51 / .378 / 27; 13 / e-Vancouver Grizzlies / 23 / 59 / .280 / 35; 14 / e-Golden State Warriors / 17 / 65 / .207 / 41; 2nd seed in the West, 2nd-best league record	Regular season	Eastern Conference: # / Team / W / L / PCT / GB; 1 / c-Philadelphia 76ers / 56 / 26 / .683 / –; 2 / y-Milwaukee Bucks / 52 / 30 / .634 / 4; 3 / x-Miami Heat / 50 / 32 / .610 / 6; 4 / x-New York Knicks / 48 / 34 / .585 / 8; 5 / x-Toronto Raptors / 47 / 35 / .573 / 9; 6 / x-Charlotte Hornets / 46 / 36 / .561 / 10; 7 / x-Orlando Magic / 43 / 39 / .524 / 13; 8 / x-Indiana Pacers / 41 / 41 / .500 / 15; 9 / e-Boston Celtics / 36 / 46 / .439 / 20; 10 / e-Detroit Pistons / 32 / 50 / .390 / 24; 11 / e-Cleveland Cavaliers / 30 / 52 / .366 / 26; 12 / e-New Jersey Nets / 26 / 56 / .317 / 30; 13 / e-Atlanta Hawks / 25 / 57 / .305 / 31; 14 / e-Washington Wizards / 19 / 63 / .232 / 37; 15 / e-Chicago Bulls / 15 / 67 / .183 / 42; 1st seed in the East, 3rd-best league record
Defeated the (7) Portland Trail Blazers, 3–0	First round	Defeated the (8) Indiana Pacers, 3–1
Defeated the (3) Sacramento Kings, 4–0	Conference semifinals	Defeated the (5) Toronto Raptors, 4–3
Defeated the (1) San Antonio Spurs, 4–0	Conference finals	Defeated the (2) Milwaukee Bucks, 4–3

=== Regular season series ===
Both teams split the two meetings, each won by the home team:

December 5, 2000

Philadelphia 76ers 85, Los Angeles Lakers 96

Staples Center, Los Angeles, California

February 14, 2001

Los Angeles Lakers 97, Philadelphia 76ers 112

First Union Center, Philadelphia, Pennsylvania

== 2001 NBA Finals rosters ==
=== Los Angeles Lakers ===
2000–01 Los Angeles Lakers roster
Players

Pos.	No.	Player	Height	Weight	DOB	From
G/F	8	Kobe Bryant	6 ft 6 in (1.98 m)	220 lb (100 kg)		Lower Merion HS (PA)
G	2	Derek Fisher	6 ft 1 in (1.85 m)	205 lb (93 kg)		Little Rock
F/C	40	Greg Foster	6 ft 11 in (2.11 m)	240 lb (109 kg)		UTEP
F	17	Rick Fox	6 ft 7 in (2.01 m)	235 lb (107 kg)		North Carolina
F	3	Devean George	6 ft 8 in (2.03 m)	240 lb (109 kg)		Augsburg
F/C	54	Horace Grant	6 ft 10 in (2.08 m)	245 lb (111 kg)		Clemson
G	4	Ron Harper	6 ft 6 in (1.98 m)	185 lb (84 kg)		Miami (OH)
F	5	Robert Horry	6 ft 10 in (2.08 m)	240 lb (109 kg)		Alabama
G	10	Tyronn Lue	6 ft 0 in (1.83 m)	175 lb (79 kg)		Nebraska
F	35	Mark Madsen	6 ft 9 in (2.06 m)	245 lb (111 kg)		Stanford
F	14	Slava Medvedenko (IN)	6 ft 10 in (2.08 m)	253 lb (115 kg)		Ukraine
C	34	Shaquille O'Neal	7 ft 1 in (2.16 m)	338 lb (153 kg)		LSU
G	12	Mike Penberthy (IN)	6 ft 3 in (1.91 m)	180 lb (82 kg)		Master's
G/F	7	Isaiah Rider (IN)	6 ft 5 in (1.96 m)	215 lb (98 kg)		UNLV
G	20	Brian Shaw	6 ft 6 in (1.98 m)	205 lb (93 kg)		UC Santa Barbara

Coaches
Head coach
- (United States) Phil Jackson (North Dakota)
Assistant(s)
- (United States) Tex Winter (USC)
- (United States) Jim Cleamons (Ohio State)
- (United States) Frank Hamblen (Syracuse)

Legend
- (DP) Unsigned draft pick
- (FA) Free agent
- (S) Suspended
- Injured

Roster
Updated: February 21, 2001

=== Philadelphia 76ers ===
2000–01 Philadelphia 76ers roster
Players

Pos.	No.	Player	Height	Weight	DOB	From
G	19	Raja Bell	6 ft 5 in (1.96 m)	204 lb (93 kg)		FIU
G/F	23	Rodney Buford	6 ft 5 in (1.96 m)	189 lb (86 kg)		Creighton
G	12	Speedy Claxton (injured)	5 ft 11 in (1.80 m)	166 lb (75 kg)		Hofstra
C	52	Matt Geiger	7 ft 0 in (2.13 m)	243 lb (110 kg)		Georgia Tech
F/C	40	Tyrone Hill	6 ft 9 in (2.06 m)	240 lb (109 kg)		Xavier
G	3	Allen Iverson	6 ft 0 in (1.83 m)	165 lb (75 kg)		Georgetown
F	33	Jumaine Jones	6 ft 8 in (2.03 m)	218 lb (99 kg)		Georgia
F	9	George Lynch	6 ft 8 in (2.03 m)	218 lb (99 kg)		North Carolina
C	50	Todd MacCulloch	7 ft 0 in (2.13 m)	280 lb (127 kg)		Washington
G	8	Aaron McKie	6 ft 5 in (1.96 m)	209 lb (95 kg)		Temple
F	7	Roshown McLeod	6 ft 8 in (2.03 m)	221 lb (100 kg)		Duke
C	55	Dikembe Mutombo	7 ft 2 in (2.18 m)	245 lb (111 kg)		Georgetown
G	5	Kevin Ollie	6 ft 4 in (1.93 m)	195 lb (88 kg)		Connecticut
G	4	Pepe Sánchez	6 ft 4 in (1.93 m)	195 lb (88 kg)		Temple
G	20	Eric Snow	6 ft 3 in (1.91 m)	190 lb (86 kg)		Michigan State

Coaches
Head coach
- (United States) Larry Brown (North Carolina)
Assistant(s)
- (United States) Randy Ayers (Miami (OH))
- (United States) John Kuester (North Carolina)

Legend
- (DP) Unsigned draft pick
- (FA) Free agent
- (S) Suspended
- Injured

Roster

== Series summary ==
Game	Date	Road team	Result	Home team
Game 1	June 6	Philadelphia 76ers	107–101 (OT) (1–0)	Los Angeles Lakers
Game 2	June 8	Philadelphia 76ers	89–98 (1–1)	Los Angeles Lakers
Game 3	June 10	Los Angeles Lakers	96–91 (2–1)	Philadelphia 76ers
Game 4	June 13	Los Angeles Lakers	100–86 (3–1)	Philadelphia 76ers
Game 5	June 15	Los Angeles Lakers	108–96 (4–1)	Philadelphia 76ers

=== Game 1 ===
NBC

June 6
9:30 pm ET (6:30 pm PT)

Recap at the Wayback Machine (archived May 9, 2009)

Philadelphia 76ers 107, Los Angeles Lakers 101 (OT)
Scoring by quarter: 22–23, 34–27, 23–27, 15–17, Overtime: 13–7
Pts: Allen Iverson 48; Rebs: Dikembe Mutombo 16; Asts: Aaron McKie 9	Pts: Shaquille O'Neal 44; Rebs: Shaquille O'Neal 20; Asts: Bryant, Fox, O'Neal 5 each
Philadelphia leads the series, 1–0

Staples Center, Los Angeles, California
Attendance: 18,997
Referees:
- No. 27 Dick Bavetta
- No. 10 Ron Garretson
- No. 17 Joe Crawford

The Lakers dominated early, in what looked like to be their fourth series sweep. Scoring 16 straight points, the Lakers took a 21–9 lead over the Allen Iverson-led 76ers. Despite this major lead, Iverson began dominating at the half of the 2nd quarter scoring 30 first half points. The 76ers turned the game around and even went up by 15 points during the third quarter before the Lakers started a comeback. Shaquille O'Neal was a major factor in the comeback, scoring 18 points in the quarter.

The Lakers played fantastically during the 4th quarter, and Tyronn Lue came off the bench and limited Iverson to merely 3 points and had 3 assists and 2 steals of his own. The game was eventually tied at 94, and when Dikembe Mutombo missed two free throws and Eric Snow's desperation three-pointer at the buzzer bounced off the rim, the game went to overtime.

The Lakers scored the first 5 points in the first half of overtime. Raja Bell then hit a tough layup to answer, followed by Iverson scoring 7 straight points, including a three pointer to give them the lead. Iverson followed up with a step back 2-pointer over Lue which is famously known as he stepped over Lue after hitting the shot. The 76ers finished with a 6-point win to take the first game of the series.

=== Game 2 ===
NBC

June 8
9:30 pm ET (6:30 pm PT)

Recap at the Wayback Machine (archived April 1, 2009)

Philadelphia 76ers 89, Los Angeles Lakers 98
Scoring by quarter: 24–25, 23–24, 20–28, 22–21
Pts: Allen Iverson 23; Rebs: Dikembe Mutombo 13; Asts: Aaron McKie 6	Pts: Kobe Bryant 31; Rebs: Shaquille O'Neal 20; Asts: Shaquille O'Neal 9
Series tied, 1–1

Staples Center, Los Angeles, California
Attendance: 18,997
Referees:
- No. 29 Steve Javie
- No. 7 Bernie Fryer
- No. 34 Ronnie Nunn

Kobe Bryant started off the game with 12 points in the first quarter, while Shaq scored 12 points in the second quarter. Despite their points, the 76ers kept a close lead as Larry Brown ran over 10 plays searching for the right quartet, and the fact that all the Lakers besides Bryant and O'Neal were shooting only at 27%. The Sixers were down by 13 in the fourth quarter, and were making a comeback due to Shaq sitting out with 5 fouls, which helped the 76ers to score 7 straight. Even though the 76ers were within 3 points of the Lakers, the 6 of 16 foul shooting in the fourth quarter put them behind permanently. O'Neal finished with 28 points, 20 rebounds, nine assists, and eight blocks, coming close to a quadruple double. Before the game, Lakers coach Phil Jackson had growled at O'Neal, "Don't be afraid to block a shot!" after O'Neal failed to block a shot in Game 1.

=== Game 3 ===
NBC

June 10
8:00 pm ET

"Recap". NBA.com. Archived from the original on April 1, 2009.

Los Angeles Lakers 96, Philadelphia 76ers 91
Scoring by quarter: 25–25, 30–20, 18–21, 23–25
Pts: Kobe Bryant 32; Rebs: Shaquille O'Neal 12; Asts: Bryant, Horry, O'Neal, Shaw 3 each	Pts: Allen Iverson 35; Rebs: Iverson, Mutombo 12 each Asts: Aaron McKie 8
Los Angeles leads the series, 2–1

First Union Center, Philadelphia, Pennsylvania
Attendance: 20,900
Referees:
- No. 15 Bennett Salvatore
- No. 26 Bob Delaney
- No. 43 Dan Crawford

For the second consecutive game, the Lakers led for more than 30 minutes of game time (LA led for 37:54 to the Sixers' 3:40 in Game 3) but still found themselves clinging to a one-possession lead late. Philadelphia trimmed a nine-point Laker lead with just over seven minutes to play to one point three separate times in the final two minutes, having fouled out LA starters Shaquille O'Neal (30 points, 12 rebounds) and Derek Fisher in the process, but they were never able to tie or take the lead despite holding multiple possessions with a chance to do so down the stretch. Allen Iverson finished with a game-high 35 points; he made one of two free throws to trim the lead to one at 86–85 just outside of two minutes to play. After Rick Fox also split a pair of foul shots for LA, Iverson turned the ball over on the Sixers' ensuing possession, and Kobe Bryant answered with running floater to stretch the lead back to four. After Kevin Ollie converted a three-point play off a put-back basket to once again pull within one, Brian Shaw found Robert Horry for a crucial wide-open corner three – one of many clutch playoff shots from Horry in a career that became known for them – to give the Lakers a 92–88 lead with 47 seconds remaining.

The 76ers would respond again; after maintaining possession on two three-point misses that deflected out of bounds, Iverson was fouled by Tyronn Lue on a third three-point attempt of the possession, making all three shots to once again bring the Sixers within one point with 27 seconds remaining. But after Horry made two free throws, Bryant and the Lakers forced Iverson into a contested driving layup that he missed, and Horry rebounded with under 10 seconds to play before adding two more free throws to secure the victory and a 2–1 series lead. Bryant led the Lakers with 32 points having played the entire game, while the Sixers shot just 2 for 12 from three-point range.

=== Game 4 ===
NBC

June 13
9:30 pm ET

"Recap". NBA.com. Archived from the original on April 1, 2009.

Los Angeles Lakers 100, Philadelphia 76ers 86
Scoring by quarter: 22–14, 29–23, 26–22, 23–27
Pts: Shaquille O'Neal 34; Rebs: Shaquille O'Neal 14; Asts: Kobe Bryant 9	Pts: Allen Iverson 35; Rebs: Dikembe Mutombo 9 Asts: Iverson, Snow 4 each
Los Angeles leads the series, 3–1

First Union Center, Philadelphia, Pennsylvania
Attendance: 20,896
Referees:
- No. 25 Hugh Evans
- No. 35 Jack Nies
- No. 32 Eddie F. Rush

=== Game 5 ===
NBC

June 15
9:30 pm ET

"Recap". NBA.com. Archived from the original on April 1, 2009.

Los Angeles Lakers 108, Philadelphia 76ers 96
Scoring by quarter: 24–27, 28–21, 31–20, 25–28
Pts: Shaquille O'Neal 29; Rebs: Shaquille O'Neal 13; Asts: Bryant, Fox 6 each	Pts: Allen Iverson 37; Rebs: Tyrone Hill 13; Asts: Eric Snow 12
Los Angeles wins the NBA Finals, 4–1

First Union Center, Philadelphia, Pennsylvania
Attendance: 20,890
Referees:
- No. 27 Dick Bavetta
- No. 7 Bernie Fryer
- No. 17 Joe Crawford

To date, this is the most recent NBA Finals game played in Philadelphia.

While the NBA has regularly presented the NBA championship on the court since 1994, the Lakers opted to receive the Larry O'Brien Championship Trophy inside their locker room in order to avoid the hostile Philadelphia crowd.

== Player statistics ==
Legend
GP	Games played	GS	Games started	MPG	Minutes per game
FG%	Field-goal percentage	3P%	3-point field-goal percentage	FT%	Free-throw percentage
RPG	Rebounds per game	APG	Assists per game	SPG	Steals per game
BPG	Blocks per game	PPG	Points per game

Los Angeles Lakers

Los Angeles Lakers statistics
Player	GP	GS	MPG	FG%	3P%	FT%	RPG	APG	SPG	BPG	PPG
Kobe Bryant	5	5	46.8	.415	.333	.842	7.8	5.8	1.4	1.4	24.6
Derek Fisher	5	5	31.6	.436	.526	.833	1.2	2.0	1.6	0.2	9.8
Rick Fox	5	5	32.8	.441	.467	.923	4.6	3.8	1.2	0.4	9.8
Horace Grant	5	5	24.6	.294	.000	.750	5.6	0.6	0.4	1.4	5.2
Ron Harper	3	0	8.3	.625	.333	.667	1.7	1.0	0.3	0.3	4.3
Robert Horry	5	0	25.4	.560	.615	1.000	5.0	1.2	0.8	1.4	8.4
Tyronn Lue	5	0	14.6	.583	.667	.000	0.8	1.4	1.4	0.2	3.6
Mark Madsen	2	0	1.5	.000	.000	.000	0.5	0.0	0.0	0.5	0.0
Shaquille O'Neal	5	5	45.0	.573	.000	.513	15.8	4.8	0.4	3.4	33.0
Brian Shaw	5	0	18.6	.300	.300	.600	3.2	2.8	0.8	0.0	3.6

Philadelphia 76ers

Philadelphia 76ers statistics
Player	GP	GS	MPG	FG%	3P%	FT%	RPG	APG	SPG	BPG	PPG
Raja Bell	5	0	15.8	.308	.000	.500	1.8	0.8	2.0	0.0	2.6
Rodney Buford	3	0	4.3	.167	.000	.000	2.0	0.0	0.0	0.0	0.7
Matt Geiger	5	0	10.8	.667	.000	1.000	1.0	0.4	0.2	0.0	5.2
Tyrone Hill	5	5	28.2	.394	.000	.778	6.6	0.4	0.0	1.2	6.6
Allen Iverson	5	5	47.4	.407	.282	.729	5.6	3.8	1.8	0.2	35.6
Jumaine Jones	5	4	12.4	.400	.500	.000	2.0	0.2	0.2	0.4	2.0
George Lynch	2	0	7.0	.333	.000	.000	2.5	0.5	1.0	0.0	1.0
Todd MacCulloch	5	0	6.2	.417	.000	.750	1.4	0.0	0.0	0.0	2.6
Aaron McKie	5	5	41.4	.313	.444	.667	5.4	6.0	1.2	0.6	8.0
Dikembe Mutombo	5	5	41.6	.600	.000	.692	12.2	0.4	0.4	2.2	16.8
Kevin Ollie	5	0	3.0	.333	.000	1.000	0.2	0.2	0.0	0.0	1.0
Eric Snow	5	1	32.8	.407	.000	.731	4.4	6.0	1.6	0.2	12.6

== Broadcasting ==
The 2001 NBA Finals was aired in the United States on NBC (including KNBC in Los Angeles and WCAU in Philadelphia) with Marv Albert and Doug Collins on play-by-play and color commentary respectively. Albert, who last worked the Finals for NBC Sports in 1997, had been rehired by NBC in 1999, two years after a sex scandal led to his dismissal. Albert also began working for TNT during this period, a role he continued until 2021. Collins departed NBC following the series to serve as head coach of the Washington Wizards; he later reunited with Albert to call conference finals games for TNT in the mid-to-late 2000s alongside Mike Fratello and later Steve Kerr.

Ahmad Rashad served as the studio host in place of Hannah Storm, who took a maternity leave during the finals. Kevin Johnson and P. J. Carlesimo served as studio analysts, while Lewis Johnson and Jim Gray served as sideline reporters.

== Aftermath ==
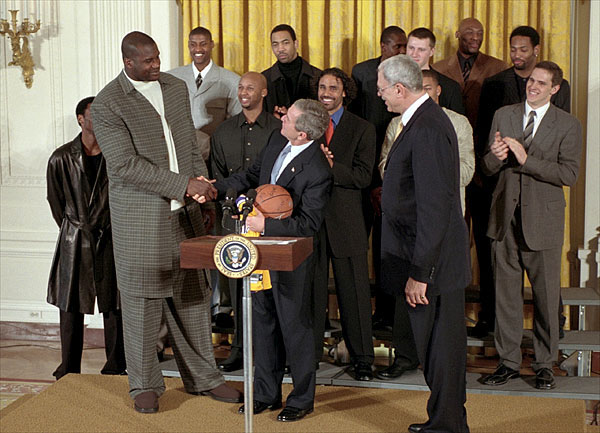
Shaquille O'Neal shaking hands with President George W. Bush

The Lakers won their third straight championship in a four-game sweep of the New Jersey Nets the following year.

Also for the Lakers, their 15–1 postseason record was the best in NBA history. This record would later be broken in the 2017 NBA playoffs by the Golden State Warriors, who achieved a 16–1 record en route to their NBA Championship. By this point, the first round series was a best-of-seven, a change implemented for the 2002–03 season.

As of the 2025-26 season, the series remains the 76ers’ last NBA Finals appearance. The Sixers would win only 43 games in their 2001–02 season, whose story was injuries. Nevertheless, they made the playoffs as the sixth seed, but were defeated by the Boston Celtics in five games. The Celtics themselves came within two games of returning to the NBA Finals for the first time since 1987, but were ousted by the upstart Nets, who made the NBA Finals for the first time, denying a possible Celtics-Lakers final. As for the Sixers, they would never challenge for the title again in the Allen Iverson era, with the team reaching the playoffs only twice for the next four years, winning only one series. Not only is 2001 the last NBA Finals appearance for the Sixers, but they have not been past the second round since this season as well.

Larry Brown later coached the Detroit Pistons to their third championship in the 2004 NBA Finals, defeating the Lakers 4–1.
