= Slava Medvedenko =

Ukrainian basketball player (born 1979)

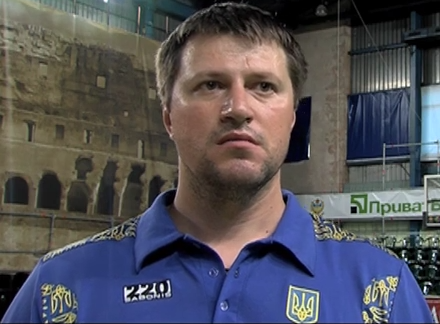
- Medvedenko being interviewed as a coach after a match in which the Ukrainian team U16 played in 2015

Personal details
- Born: 4 April 1979 (age 47) Karapyshi, Kiev Oblast, Ukrainian SSR, Soviet Union
- Party: Holos
- Basketball career

Personal information
- Listed height: 6 ft 10 in (2.08 m)
- Listed weight: 250 lb (113 kg)

Career information
- NBA draft: 1998: undrafted
- Playing career: 1996–2007
- Position: Power forward
- Number: 14

Career history
- 1996–1997: Dandy Basket
- 1997–1998: Budivelnik Kyiv
- 1998–1999: Alita Alytus
- 1999–2000: Kyiv
- 2000–2006: Los Angeles Lakers
- 2006–2007: Atlanta Hawks

Career highlights
- 2× NBA champion (2001, 2002)

Career NBA statistics
- Points: 1,390 (5.3 ppg)
- Rebounds: 744 (2.8 rpg)
- Assists: 136 (0.5 apg)
- Stats at NBA.com
- Stats at Basketball Reference

Stanislav "Slava" Yuriyovych Medvedenko (Ukrainian: Станіслав "Слава" Юрійович Медведенко; born 4 April 1979) is a Ukrainian former professional basketball player, who played with the Atlanta Hawks and the Los Angeles Lakers in the National Basketball Association. His position was power forward. After his basketball career ended, Medvedenko embarked on a political career in Ukraine.

== Early life ==
Medvedenko is a native of Kyiv, Ukraine.

== Professional career ==
Medvedenko began his professional career in 1996 in Ukraine. He played for Dandy Basket in 1996–97 and Budivelnik Kyiv in 1997–98. After a season in Lithuania with Alita Alytus in 1998–99, he returned to Ukraine to play for BC Kyiv in 1999–2000.

Medvedenko joined the Los Angeles Lakers for the 2000–01 NBA season and was a member of the Lakers' championships in 2001 and 2002.

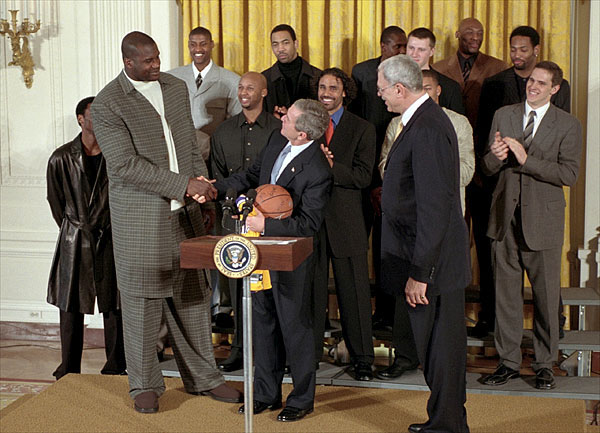
Medvedenko standing two rows behind coach Phil Jackson at a White House ceremony following the Lakers' 2001 NBA Finals victory.

In the 2003–04 season, Medvedenko averaged career highs of 8.3 points and five rebounds. His contributions slipped in the playoffs, averaging only four points and 2.5 rebounds, but the Lakers liked his toughness and shooting ability. He was relied on due to injuries to Karl Malone and Horace Grant.

In the 2004 off-season, Medvedenko signed a new two-year deal with the Lakers. With the team now coached by Rudy Tomjanovich following the departure of Phil Jackson, Medvedenko averaged 3.8 points and played in only 43 games in the 2004–05 season. He was criticised by his teammates for shooting too often, recording only 13 assists for the season.

In January 2006, Medvedenko underwent season-ending back surgery after sustaining a herniated disc in his lower back in early November 2005. He appeared in just two games in the 2005–06 season. He was waived by the Lakers on 6 March 2006, to clear roster space for the signing of Jim Jackson.

On 28 December 2006, Medvedenko signed with the Atlanta Hawks for about $600,000, for the remainder of the 2006–07 NBA season.

== NBA career statistics ==
Legend
GP	Games played	GS	Games started	MPG	Minutes per game
FG%	Field goal percentage	3P%	3-point field goal percentage	FT%	Free throw percentage
RPG	Rebounds per game	APG	Assists per game	SPG	Steals per game
BPG	Blocks per game	PPG	Points per game	**Bold**	Career high
†	Won an NBA championship

=== Regular season ===
Year	Team	GP	GS	MPG	FG%	3P%	FT%	RPG	APG	SPG	BPG	PPG
2000–01†	L.A. Lakers	7	0	5.6	.480	**1.000**	.583	1.3	.3	.1	.1	4.6
2001–02†	L.A. Lakers	**71**	6	10.3	.477	.000	.661	2.2	.6	.4	.2	4.7
2002–03	L.A. Lakers	58	10	10.7	.434	.000	.721	2.4	.3	.2	.1	4.4
2003–04	L.A. Lakers	68	**38**	**21.2**	.441	.000	.767	**5.0**	**.8**	**.6**	**.3**	**8.3**
2004–05	L.A. Lakers	43	4	9.8	.455	.000	.821	1.8	.3	.2	.0	3.8
2005–06	L.A. Lakers	2	0	3.0	**.500**	.000	.000	.0	.5	.0	.0	1.0
2006–07	Atlanta	14	0	5.8	.414	.500	**.850**	1.0	.1	.0	.1	3.0
Career		263	58	12.7	.450	.154	.740	2.8	.5	.3	.2	5.3

=== Playoffs ===
Year	Team	GP	GS	MPG	FG%	3P%	FT%	RPG	APG	SPG	BPG	PPG
2002†	L.A. Lakers	7	0	3.0	**.600**	.000	.000	.6	.0	.0	.0	.9
2003	L.A. Lakers	9	0	8.1	.556	.000	.667	2.0	.1	.1	.1	3.8
2004	L.A. Lakers	**21**	**1**	**11.3**	.440	.000	**.810**	**2.5**	**.5**	**.2**	**.2**	**4.0**
Career		37	1	8.9	.477	.000	.778	2.0	.3	.1	.1	3.3

== Political career ==
Medvedenko was a candidate (number 11 on the election list) for the Kyiv City Council of the party Voice in the 2020 Kyiv local election set for 25 October 2020. The party only managed to win nine seats.

== Military career ==
In 2022, Medvedenko auctioned off both his NBA championship rings and memorabilia in order to raise money for rehabilitation and recovery of Ukrainian kids, which suffered during the war. He and his wife both served in the military during Russian war against Ukraine. He was gifted two replacement championship rings in 2023 by Jeanie Buss. The ceremony was also attended by Pau Gasol and Sasha Vujacic.
