= 2003–04 Los Angeles Lakers season =

NBA professional basketball team season

- Conference champions
- Division champions
- Head coach: Phil Jackson
- General manager: Mitch Kupchak
- Owner: Jerry Buss
- Arena: Staples Center

Results
- Record: 56–26 (.683)
- Place: Division: 1st (Pacific); Conference: 2nd (Western)
- Playoff finish: NBA Finals (lost to Pistons 1–4)
- Stats at Basketball Reference

Local media
- Television: Fox Sports Net West, KCAL
- Radio: AM 570 KLAC

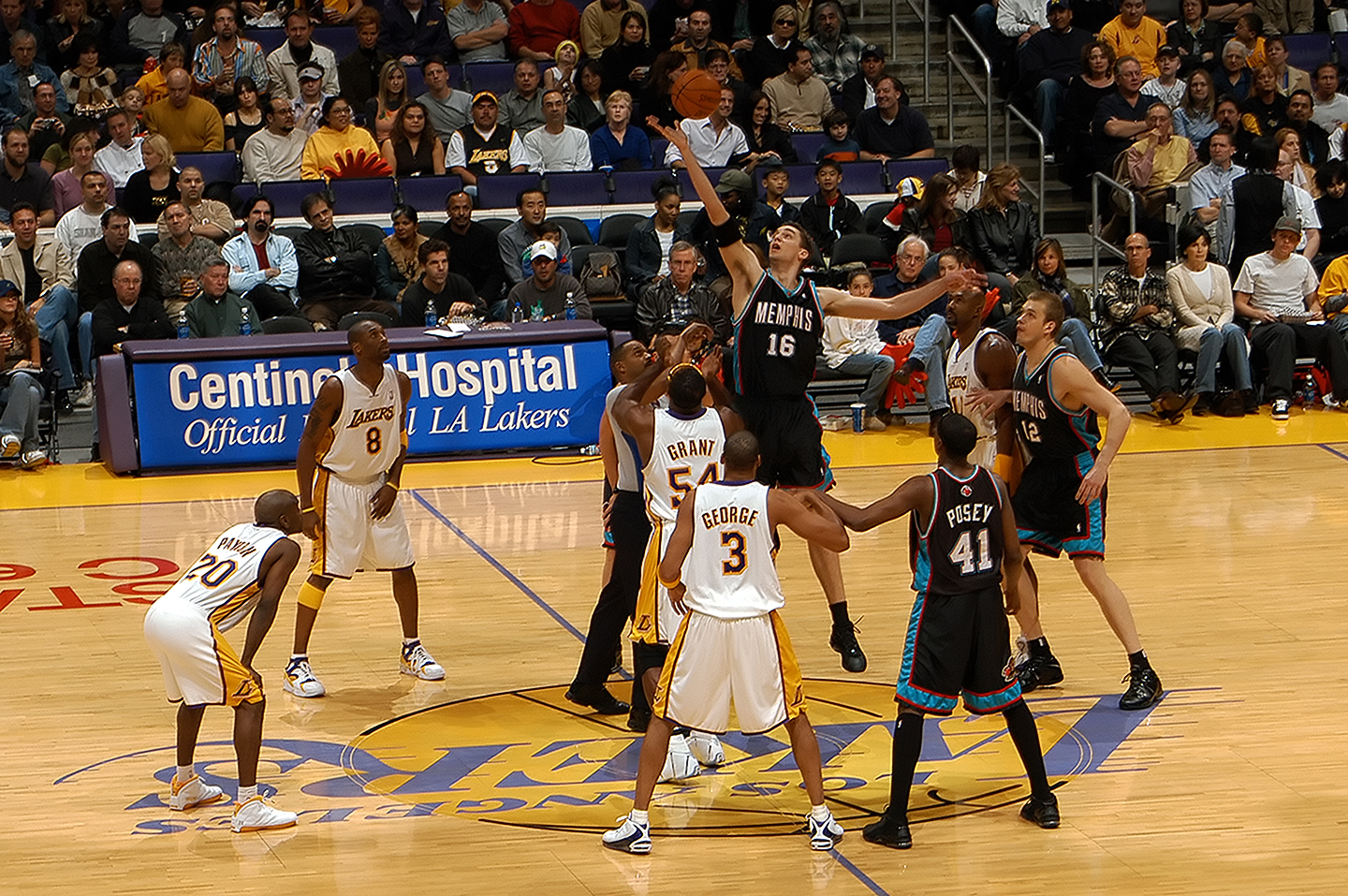
Horace Grant battles for a jump ball versus future Laker Pau Gasol in November 2003.

The 2003–04 Los Angeles Lakers season was the Lakers' 56th season in the National Basketball Association and 44th in the city of Los Angeles.

The Lakers entered the season following a disappointing second-round loss to the eventual champion San Antonio Spurs in the 2003 playoffs. During the offseason, the Lakers signed star free agents Karl Malone and Gary Payton and re-signed free agent power forward Horace Grant. Following these acquisitions, the Lakers became the instant favorites to win the NBA title.

Despite major acquisitions, key moves, and becoming overnight title favorites, the Lakers would run into major setbacks to begin the season. During the 2003 off-season, superstar guard Kobe Bryant had been accused of sexual assault in Colorado. Media attention surrounding the case would prove to be an ongoing distraction for the team, and Bryant missed games during his trial. In addition, Bryant's feud with Shaquille O'Neal reached a peak during the season, as both players criticized each other in the media. Payton struggled with coach Phil Jackson's triangle offense, and Malone missed significant time due to injuries.

Despite the setbacks, the Lakers finished the season with a 56–26 overall record, good enough to clinch the second seed in the Western Conference en route to the playoffs. In the playoffs, they defeated the Houston Rockets, the defending champion San Antonio Spurs, and the Minnesota Timberwolves to earn the franchise its 28th appearance in the NBA Finals. The Lakers entered the Finals against the Detroit Pistons as favorites. This was the third meeting between the Lakers and the Pistons in the NBA Finals, after both franchises met in 1988 and 1989. However, the underdog Pistons' strong defense and teamwork propelled them to their third championship in franchise history, and the star-studded Lakers would collapse in five games. After the season, Jackson and the team mutually agreed to part ways and O'Neal was traded to the Miami Heat.

== Draft picks ==
Round	Pick	Player	Position	Nationality	College
1	24	Brian Cook	F	United States	Illinois
2	32	Luke Walton	F	United States	Arizona

== Roster ==
2003–04 Los Angeles Lakers roster
Players

Pos.	No.	Player	Height	Weight	DOB	From
G	8	Kobe Bryant	6 ft 6 in (1.98 m)	205 lb (93 kg)	1978-08-23	Lower Merion HS (PA)
C	7	Brian Cook	6 ft 9 in (2.06 m)	234 lb (106 kg)	1980-12-04	Illinois
G	2	Derek Fisher	6 ft 1 in (1.85 m)	210 lb (95 kg)	1974-08-09	Little Rock
F	17	Rick Fox	6 ft 7 in (2.01 m)	230 lb (104 kg)	1969-07-24	North Carolina
F	3	Devean George	6 ft 8 in (2.03 m)	235 lb (107 kg)	1977-08-29	Augsburg
F	54	Horace Grant	6 ft 10 in (2.08 m)	245 lb (111 kg)	1965-07-04	Clemson
F	11	Karl Malone	6 ft 9 in (2.06 m)	250 lb (113 kg)	1963-07-24	Louisiana Tech
F	14	Slava Medvedenko	6 ft 10 in (2.08 m)	253 lb (115 kg)	1979-04-04	Ukraine
C	34	Shaquille O'Neal	7 ft 1 in (2.16 m)	325 lb (147 kg)	1972-03-06	LSU
G	20	Gary Payton	6 ft 4 in (1.93 m)	180 lb (82 kg)	1968-07-23	Oregon State
G	21	Kareem Rush	6 ft 5 in (1.96 m)	200 lb (91 kg)	1980-10-30	Missouri
F	9	Bryon Russell	6 ft 7 in (2.01 m)	225 lb (102 kg)	1970-12-31	Long Beach State
C	31	Jamal Sampson	6 ft 11 in (2.11 m)	235 lb (107 kg)	1983-05-13	California
F	4	Luke Walton	6 ft 8 in (2.03 m)	235 lb (107 kg)	1980-03-28	Arizona

Coaches
Head coach
- Phil Jackson
Assistant(s)
- Jim Cleamons
- Frank Hamblen
- Kurt Rambis
- Tex Winter

Legend
- (DP) Unsigned draft pick
- (FA) Free agent
- (S) Suspended
- Injured

Roster
Updated: January 30, 2004

== Regular season ==
=== Season standings ===
==== By division ====
Pacific Division	W	L	PCT	GB	Home	Road	Div
y-Los Angeles Lakers	56	26	.683	–	34–7	22–19	15–9
x-Sacramento Kings	55	27	.671	1	34–7	21–20	16–8
e-Portland Trail Blazers	41	41	.500	15	25–16	16–25	13–11
e-Seattle SuperSonics	37	45	.451	19	21–20	16–25	11–13
e-Golden State Warriors	37	45	.451	19	27–14	10–31	12–12
e-Phoenix Suns	29	53	.354	27	18–23	11–30	9–15
e-Los Angeles Clippers	28	54	.341	28	18–23	10–31	8–16

==== By conference ====
#	Western Conference				
#	Team	W	L	PCT	GB
1	c-Minnesota Timberwolves	58	24	.707	–
2	y-Los Angeles Lakers	56	26	.683	2
3	x-San Antonio Spurs	57	25	.695	1
4	x-Sacramento Kings	55	27	.671	3
5	x-Dallas Mavericks	52	30	.634	6
6	x-Memphis Grizzlies	50	32	.610	8
7	x-Houston Rockets	45	37	.549	13
8	x-Denver Nuggets	43	39	.524	15
9	e-Utah Jazz	42	40	.512	16
10	e-Portland Trail Blazers	41	41	.500	17
11	e-Seattle SuperSonics	37	45	.451	21
12	e-Golden State Warriors	37	45	.451	21
13	e-Phoenix Suns	29	53	.354	29
14	e-Los Angeles Clippers	28	54	.341	30

== Game log ==
=== Pre-season ===
2003 preseason game log
Total: 3–5
Preseason

Game	Date	Team	Score	High points	High rebounds	High assists	Location Attendance	Record
1	October 7	Golden State	W 107-89	Shaquille O'Neal (16)	Devean George (7)	Gary Payton (7)	Stan Sheriff Center (Honolulu, HI); 10,300	1–0
2	October 8	Golden State	L 83-99	Gary Payton (11)	Shaquille O'Neal (8)	Shaquille O'Neal (5)	Stan Sheriff Center (Honolulu, HI); 10,300	1-1
3	October 14	Phoenix	L 86-104	Derek Fisher (14)	3 players tied (6)	Gary Payton (4)	San Diego Sports Arena (San Diego, CA); 13,144	1–2
4	October 16	Cleveland	W 86-78	Karl Malone (18)	Karl Malone (13)	Malone & Payton (7)	Staples Center; 18,997	2-2
5	October 17	Phoenix	W 91-84	Derek Fisher (18)	Eric Chenowith (7)	Luke Walton (4)	Staples Center; 18,997	3–2
6	October 19	Cleveland	L 87-102	Shaquille O'Neal (20)	Shaquille O'Neal (6)	Luke Walton (5)	Centennial Garden (Bakersfield, CA); 9,772	3-3
7	October 23	L.A. Clippers	L 101-107	Shaquille O'Neal (18)	Shaquille O'Neal (9)	Gary Payton (7)	Arrowhead Pond (Anaheim, CA); 18,298	3–4
8	October 24	Sacramento	L 87-93	Shaquille O'Neal (19)	Shaquille O'Neal (14)	Malone & O'Neal (5)	Thomas & Mack Center (Las Vegas, NV); 18,234	3–5

2003–04 season schedule

=== Regular season ===
2003–04 game log
Total: 56–26 (home: 34–7; road: 22–19)
October: 1–0 (home: 1–0; road: 0–0)

Game	Date	Team	Score	High points	High rebounds	High assists	Location Attendance	Record
1	October 28	Dallas	W 109–93	Gary Payton (21)	Karl Malone (10)	Malone & Payton (9)	Staples Center; 18,997	1–0

November: 13–3 (home: 9–0; road: 4–3)

Game	Date	Team	Score	High points	High rebounds	High assists	Location Attendance	Record
2	November 1	@ Phoenix	W 103–99	Shaquille O'Neal (24)	3 players tied (12)	Gary Payton (9)	America West Arena; 18,422	2–0
3	November 2	Golden State	W 87–72	Kobe Bryant (21)	Shaquille O'Neal (14)	Gary Payton (11)	Staples Center; 18,997	3–0
4	November 4	@ Milwaukee	W 113–107	Kobe Bryant (31)	Shaquille O'Neal (14)	Kobe Bryant (8)	Bradley Center; 18,717	4–0
5	November 6	@ San Antonio	W 120–117 (2OT)	Kobe Bryant (37)	Shaquille O'Neal (20)	O'Neal & Payton (6)	SBC Center; 18,717	5–0
6	November 7	@ New Orleans	L 95–114	Shaquille O'Neal (21)	Malone & O'Neal (6)	Gary Payton (11)	New Orleans Arena; 18,717	5–1
7	November 10	@ Memphis	L 95–105	Shaquille O'Neal (20)	Shaquille O'Neal (12)	Kobe Bryant (5)	Pyramid Arena; 19,351	5–2
8	November 12	Toronto	W 94–79	Shaquille O'Neal (23)	Shaquille O'Neal (14)	Gary Payton (6)	Staples Center; 18,997	6–2
9	November 14	Detroit	W 94–89	O'Neal & Payton (21)	Shaquille O'Neal (15)	Shaquille O'Neal (8)	Staples Center; 18,997	7–2
10	November 16	Miami	W 99–77	Kobe Bryant (27)	Karl Malone (10)	Gary Payton (8)	Staples Center; 18,997	8–2
11	November 18	@ Detroit	L 96–106	Malone & O'Neal (20)	Shaquille O'Neal (10)	3 players tied (5)	The Palace of Auburn Hills; 22,076	8–3
12	November 19	@ New York	W 104–83	Shaquille O'Neal (23)	Karl Malone (14)	Bryant & Malone (4)	Madison Square Garden; 19,763	9–3
13	November 21	Chicago	W 101–94	Kobe Bryant (28)	Karl Malone (18)	Bryant & Payton (4)	Staples Center; 18,997	10–3
14	November 23	Memphis	W 121–89	Kobe Bryant (28)	Slava Medvedenko (11)	Gary Payton (10)	Staples Center; 18,997	11–3
15	November 26	Washington	W 120–99	Kobe Bryant (22)	Horace Grant (6)	Malone & Payton (5)	Staples Center; 18,997	12–3
16	November 28	San Antonio	W 103–87	Devean George (19)	Karl Malone (11)	Karl Malone (10)	Staples Center; 18,997	13–3
17	November 30	Indiana	W 99–77	Shaquille O'Neal (23)	Karl Malone (15)	Kobe Bryant (7)	Staples Center; 18,997	14–3

December: 7–4 (home: 5–2; road: 2–2)

Game	Date	Team	Score	High points	High rebounds	High assists	Location Attendance	Record
18	December 3	@ San Antonio	W 90–86	Kobe Bryant (21)	Shaquille O'Neal (16)	Gary Payton (6)	SBC Center; 18,841	15–3
19	December 4	@ Dallas	W 114–103	Kobe Bryant (32)	Shaquille O'Neal (19)	Gary Payton (8)	American Airlines Center; 20,596	16–3
20	December 7	Utah	W 94–92	Bryant & O'Neal (19)	Shaquille O'Neal (15)	Shaquille O'Neal (8)	Staples Center; 18,997	17–3
21	December 9	New York	W 98–90	Kobe Bryant (21)	Shaquille O'Neal (15)	Kobe Bryant (9)	Staples Center; 18,997	18–3
22	December 12	Dallas	L 93–110	Shaquille O'Neal (25)	Shaquille O'Neal (14)	Kobe Bryant (6)	Staples Center; 18,997	18–4
23	December 13	@ Portland	L 108–112	Kobe Bryant (35)	Shaquille O'Neal (10)	Kobe Bryant (6)	Rose Garden; 20,630	18–5
24	December 19	Denver	W 101–99	Shaquille O'Neal (26)	Shaquille O'Neal (11)	Gary Payton (11)	Staples Center; 18,997	19–5
25	December 21	Phoenix	W 107–101	George & Payton (19)	Shaquille O'Neal (18)	Gary Payton (7)	Staples Center; 18,997	20–5
26	December 23	@ Golden State	L 98–107	Kobe Bryant (23)	Devean George (9)	Gary Payton (13)	The Arena in Oakland; 20,310	20–6
27	December 25	Houston	L 87–99	Kobe Bryant (23)	Horace Grant (11)	Gary Payton (7)	Staples Center; 18,997	20–7
28	December 28	Boston	W 105–82	Shaquille O'Neal (22)	Shaquille O'Neal (16)	Bryant & Payton (6)	Staples Center; 18,997	21–7

January: 6–9 (home: 5–2; road: 1–7)

Game	Date	Team	Score	High points	High rebounds	High assists	Location Attendance	Record
29	January 2	@ Seattle	L 109–111	Kobe Bryant (32)	Bryant & Grant (6)	Kobe Bryant (6)	KeyArena; 17,072	21–8
30	January 4	@ L.A. Clippers	L 98–101	Kobe Bryant (44)	Kobe Bryant (10)	Payton & Russell (4)	Staples Center; 19,653	21–9
31	January 6	@ Minnesota	L 90–106	Kobe Bryant (20)	Kobe Bryant (10)	Derek Fisher (5)	Target Center; 20,095	21–10
32	January 7	@ Denver	L 91–113	Kobe Bryant (27)	Brian Cook (8)	Kobe Bryant (6)	Pepsi Center; 19,739	21–11
33	January 9	Atlanta	W 113–67	Bryant & Medvedenko (26)	Slava Medvedenko (11)	Gary Payton (7)	Staples Center; 18,997	22–11
34	January 12	Cleveland	W 89–79	Cook & Payton (13)	Devean George (12)	Fisher & Payton (4)	Staples Center; 18,997	23–11
35	January 14	Denver	W 97–71	Slava Medvedenko (22)	Horace Grant (11)	Gary Payton (6)	Staples Center; 18,997	24–11
36	January 16	@ Sacramento	L 83–103	Kareem Rush (30)	Medvedenko & Sampson (9)	Luke Walton (5)	ARCO Arena; 17,317	24–12
37	January 17	L.A. Clippers	W 91–89	Slava Medvedenko (20)	Medvedenko & Sampson (10)	Gary Payton (15)	Staples Center; 18,997	25–12
38	January 19	Phoenix	L 85–88	Kareem Rush (18)	Payton & Sampson (8)	Gary Payton (9)	Staples Center; 18,997	25–13
39	January 21	@ Memphis	L 82–88	Gary Payton (24)	Slava Medvedenko (12)	Kareem Rush (5)	Pyramid Arena; 19,351	25–14
40	January 22	@ Dallas	L 87–106	Devean George (24)	Luke Walton (7)	Gary Payton (5)	American Airlines Center; 20,512	25–15
41	January 24	@ Utah	W 93–86	Slava Medvedenko (26)	Slava Medvedenko (12)	Bryant & Payton (6)	Delta Center; 19,911	26–15
42	January 28	Seattle	W 96–82	Gary Payton (24)	Horace Grant (10)	Gary Payton (5)	Staples Center; 18,997	27–15
43	January 30	Minnesota	L 84–97	Shaquille O'Neal (22)	Shaquille O'Neal (9)	Gary Payton (9)	Staples Center; 18,997	27–16

February: 11–4 (home: 2–1; road: 9–3)

Game	Date	Team	Score	High points	High rebounds	High assists	Location Attendance	Record
44	February 1	@ Toronto	W 84–83	Shaquille O'Neal (36)	Horace Grant (9)	Shaquille O'Neal (5)	Air Canada Centre; 20,116	28–16
45	February 2	@ Indiana	L 72–85	Slava Medvedenko (14)	Gary Payton (8)	Gary Payton (7)	Conseco Fieldhouse; 18,345	28–17
46	February 4	@ Cleveland	W 111–106 (OT)	Shaquille O'Neal (37)	Grant & O'Neal (12)	O'Neal & Payton (6)	Gund Arena; 20,562	29–17
47	February 5	@ Philadelphia	L 73–96	Shaquille O'Neal (17)	Shaquille O'Neal (8)	Fisher & Walton (5)	Wachovia Center; 20,965	29–18
48	February 8	@ Orlando	W 98–96	Shaquille O'Neal (20)	Shaquille O'Neal (10)	Luke Walton (7)	TD Waterhouse Centre; 17,283	30–18
49	February 10	@ Miami	W 98–83	Shaquille O'Neal (25)	Devean George (11)	Fisher & Payton (6)	American Airlines Arena; 16,500	31–18
50	February 11	@ Houston	L 87–102	Shaquille O'Neal (24)	Shaquille O'Neal (9)	Shaquille O'Neal (4)	Toyota Center; 18,218	31–19
All-Star Break
51	February 17	Portland	W 89–86	Kobe Bryant (31)	Shaquille O'Neal (11)	Kobe Bryant (10)	Staples Center; 18,997	32–19
52	February 18	@ Golden State	W 100–99	Kobe Bryant (35)	Shaquille O'Neal (16)	Kobe Bryant (8)	The Arena in Oakland; 20,252	33–19
53	February 20	Philadelphia	W 116–88	Shaquille O'Neal (29)	Shaquille O'Neal (13)	Bryant & Fisher (7)	Staples Center; 18,997	34–19
54	February 22	@ Phoenix	W 104–92	Kobe Bryant (40)	Bryant & Fox (7)	3 players tied (5)	America West Arena; 18,422	35–19
55	February 25	@ Denver	W 112–111	Kobe Bryant (35)	Shaquille O'Neal (8)	Kobe Bryant (10)	Pepsi Center; 19,812	36–19
56	February 26	Sacramento	L 101–103	Kobe Bryant (35)	Kobe Bryant (11)	Bryant & Payton (6)	Staples Center; 18,997	36–20
57	February 28	@ Washington	W 122–110	Shaquille O'Neal (19)	Kobe Bryant (14)	Kobe Bryant (10)	MCI Center; 20,173	37–20
58	February 29	@ New Jersey	W 100–83	Shaquille O'Neal (19)	Shaquille O'Neal (14)	Kobe Bryant (10)	Continental Airlines Arena; 19,968	38–20

March: 13–3 (home: 9–0; road: 4–3)

Game	Date	Team	Score	High points	High rebounds	High assists	Location Attendance	Record
59	March 2	@ Atlanta	L 93–94	O'Neal & Payton (23)	Shaquille O'Neal (14)	Gary Payton (10)	Philips Arena; 19,445	38–21
60	March 3	@ Houston	W 96–93	Shaquille O'Neal (28)	Kobe Bryant (8)	Kobe Bryant (13)	Toyota Center; 18,172	39–21
61	March 5	Seattle	W 99–91	Shaquille O'Neal (32)	Luke Walton (9)	Fox & Payton (7)	Staples Center; 18,997	40–21
62	March 7	New Jersey	W 94–88	Shaquille O'Neal (32)	O'Neal & Payton (9)	Rick Fox (5)	Staples Center; 18,997	41–21
63	March 8	@ Utah	L 83–88	Gary Payton (21)	Shaquille O'Neal (10)	Gary Payton (7)	Delta Center; 19,911	41–22
64	March 10	@ Boston	W 117–109	Shaquille O'Neal (28)	Shaquille O'Neal (17)	Kobe Bryant (10)	FleetCenter; 18,624	42–22
65	March 12	@ Minnesota	L 86–96	Shaquille O'Neal (24)	Shaquille O'Neal (13)	Fox & Payton (6)	Target Center; 20,391	42–23
66	March 13	@ Chicago	W 88–81	Kobe Bryant (35)	Shaquille O'Neal (15)	Karl Malone (7)	United Center; 23,067	43–23
67	March 15	Orlando	W 113–110 (OT)	Kobe Bryant (38)	Shaquille O'Neal (23)	Bryant & Malone (4)	Staples Center; 18,997	44–23
68	March 17	@ L.A. Clippers	W 106–103	Kobe Bryant (27)	Shaquille O'Neal (11)	Gary Payton (7)	Staples Center; 19,668	45–23
69	March 19	L.A. Clippers	W 106–100	Kobe Bryant (27)	Shaquille O'Neal (10)	Fox & O'Neal (6)	Staples Center; 18,997	46–23
70	March 21	Milwaukee	W 104–103 (OT)	Shaquille O'Neal (31)	Shaquille O'Neal (26)	Gary Payton (6)	Staples Center; 18,997	47–23
71	March 24	Sacramento	W 115–91	Kobe Bryant (36)	Shaquille O'Neal (16)	Bryant & O'Neal (6)	Staples Center; 18,997	48–23
72	March 26	Minnesota	W 90–73	Kobe Bryant (35)	Shaquille O'Neal (18)	Kobe Bryant (5)	Staples Center; 18,997	49–23
73	March 28	Utah	W 91–84	Kobe Bryant (34)	Shaquille O'Neal (14)	Kobe Bryant (4)	Staples Center; 18,997	50–23
74	March 30	New Orleans	W 107–88	Kobe Bryant (23)	Shaquille O'Neal (9)	Karl Malone (9)	Staples Center; 18,997	51–23

April: 5–3 (home: 3–2; road: 2–1)

Game	Date	Team	Score	High points	High rebounds	High assists	Location Attendance	Record
75	April 1	Houston	W 93–85	Kobe Bryant (26)	Karl Malone (14)	Karl Malone (6)	Staples Center; 18,997	52–23
76	April 2	@ Seattle	W 97–86	Kobe Bryant (25)	Shaquille O'Neal (14)	Rick Fox (6)	KeyArena; 17,072	53–23
77	April 4	San Antonio	L 89–95	Kobe Bryant (28)	Malone & O'Neal (9)	Malone & O'Neal (4)	Staples Center; 18,997	53–24
78	April 6	Portland	L 80–91	Shaquille O'Neal (17)	Shaquille O'Neal (12)	Kobe Bryant (8)	Staples Center; 18,997	53–25
79	April 9	Memphis	W 103–95	Kobe Bryant (33)	Shaquille O'Neal (12)	Bryant & Payton (7)	Staples Center; 18,997	54–25
80	April 11	@ Sacramento	L 85–102	Gary Payton (15)	Karl Malone (11)	Fisher & George (5)	ARCO Arena; 17,317	54–26
81	April 13	Golden State	W 109–104	Kobe Bryant (45)	Shaquille O'Neal (13)	Kobe Bryant (8)	Staples Center; 18,997	55–26
82	April 14	@ Portland	W 105–104 (2OT)	Kobe Bryant (37)	Medvedenko & O'Neal (14)	Fisher & Payton (6)	Rose Garden; 20,609	56–26

2003–04 season schedule

=== Playoffs ===
2004 playoff game log
Total: 13–9 (home: 10–1; road: 3–8)
First round: 4–1 (home: 3–0; road: 1–1)

Game	Date	Team	Score	High points	High rebounds	High assists	Location Attendance	Series
1	April 17	Houston	W 72–71	Shaquille O'Neal (20)	Shaquille O'Neal (17)	Kobe Bryant (6)	Staples Center; 18,997	1–0
2	April 19	Houston	W 98–84	Kobe Bryant (36)	Karl Malone (8)	Gary Payton (7)	Staples Center; 18,997	2–0
3	April 23	@ Houston	L 91–102	Shaquille O'Neal (25)	Malone & O'Neal (11)	Gary Payton (7)	Toyota Center; 18,226	2–1
4	April 25	@ Houston	W 92–88 (OT)	Karl Malone (30)	Karl Malone (13)	Gary Payton (7)	Toyota Center; 18,219	3–1
5	April 28	Houston	W 97–78	Kobe Bryant (31)	Malone & O'Neal (9)	Kobe Bryant (10)	Staples Center; 18,997	4–1

Conference Semi-finals: 4–2 (home: 3–0; road: 1–2)

Game	Date	Team	Score	High points	High rebounds	High assists	Location Attendance	Series
1	May 2	@ San Antonio	L 78–88	Kobe Bryant (31)	Shaquille O'Neal (13)	Karl Malone (5)	SBC Center; 18,797	0–1
2	May 5	@ San Antonio	L 85–95	Shaquille O'Neal (32)	Shaquille O'Neal (15)	Kobe Bryant (8)	SBC Center; 18,797	0–2
3	May 9	San Antonio	W 105–81	Shaquille O'Neal (28)	Shaquille O'Neal (15)	Gary Payton (7)	Staples Center; 18,997	1–2
4	May 11	San Antonio	W 98–90	Kobe Bryant (42)	Shaquille O'Neal (14)	Karl Malone (6)	Staples Center; 18,997	2–2
5	May 13	@ San Antonio	W 74–73	Kobe Bryant (22)	Karl Malone (12)	Gary Payton (7)	SBC Center; 18,797	3–2
6	May 15	San Antonio	W 88–76	Kobe Bryant (26)	Shaquille O'Neal (19)	Bryant & Payton (7)	Staples Center; 18,997	4–2

Conference finals: 4–2 (home: 3–0; road: 1–2)

Game	Date	Team	Score	High points	High rebounds	High assists	Location Attendance	Series
1	May 21	@ Minnesota	W 97–88	Shaquille O'Neal (27)	Shaquille O'Neal (18)	Bryant & Fisher (6)	Target Center; 19,552	1–0
2	May 23	@ Minnesota	L 71–89	Kobe Bryant (27)	Shaquille O'Neal (16)	Kobe Bryant (6)	Target Center; 19,707	1–1
3	May 25	Minnesota	W 100–89	Bryant & O'Neal (22)	Shaquille O'Neal (17)	Gary Payton (9)	Staples Center; 18,997	2–1
4	May 27	Minnesota	W 92–85	Kobe Bryant (31)	Shaquille O'Neal (19)	Kobe Bryant (8)	Staples Center; 18,997	3–1
5	May 29	@ Minnesota	L 96–98	Kobe Bryant (23)	Shaquille O'Neal (13)	Kobe Bryant (7)	Target Center; 20,109	3–2
6	May 31	Minnesota	W 96–90	Shaquille O'Neal (25)	Shaquille O'Neal (11)	Gary Payton (8)	Staples Center; 18,997	4–2

NBA Finals: 1–4 (home: 1–1; road: 0–3)

Game	Date	Team	Score	High points	High rebounds	High assists	Location Attendance	Series
1	June 6	Detroit	L 75–87	Shaquille O'Neal (34)	Malone & O'Neal (11)	Kobe Bryant (4)	Staples Center; 18,997	0–1
2	June 8	Detroit	W 99–91 (OT)	Kobe Bryant (33)	Karl Malone (9)	Luke Walton (8)	Staples Center; 18,997	1–1
3	June 10	@ Detroit	L 68–88	Shaquille O'Neal (14)	Medvedenko & O'Neal (8)	Gary Payton (7)	The Palace of Auburn Hills; 22,076	1–2
4	June 13	@ Detroit	L 80–88	Shaquille O'Neal (36)	Shaquille O'Neal (20)	Rick Fox (6)	The Palace of Auburn Hills; 22,076	1–3
5	June 15	@ Detroit	L 87–100	Kobe Bryant (24)	Shaquille O'Neal (8)	Luke Walton (5)	The Palace of Auburn Hills; 22,076	1–4

2004 schedule

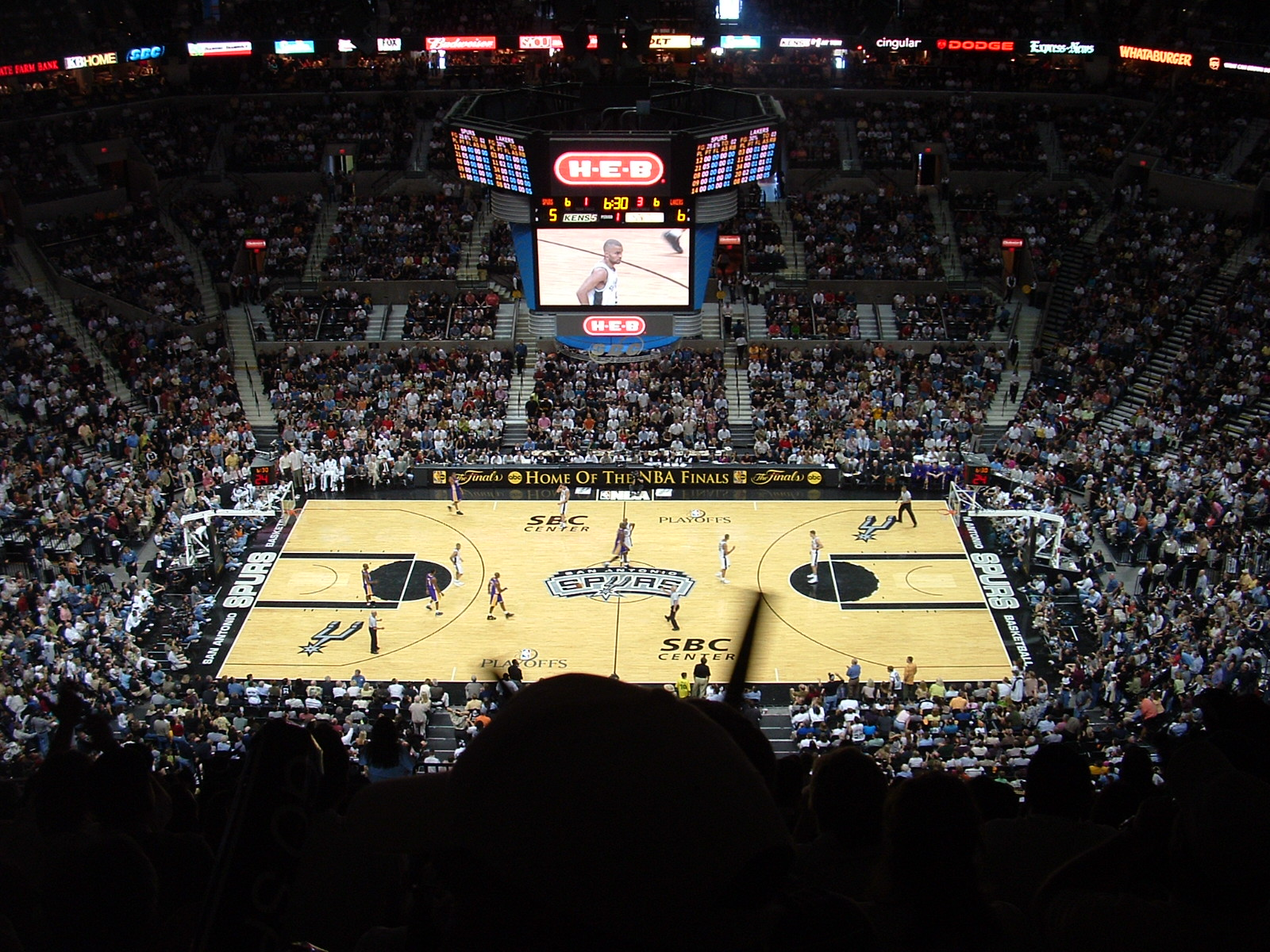
The Lakers playing against the San Antonio Spurs in Game 1 of the 2004 Western Conference Semi-finals at the SBC Center.

== NBA Finals ==
=== Series summary ===
Team/Game	1	2 (OT)	3	4	5	Wins
Los Angeles	75	99	68	80	87	1
Detroit	87	91	88	88	100	4

- (OT) denotes a game that required overtime.

The Finals were played using a 2-3-2 format, where the first two and last two games are held at the venue of the team with home court advantage. This was only used in the Finals.

=== Background ===
The Lakers had a star-studded lineup that included offseason acquisitions Karl Malone and Gary Payton as well as mainstays Kobe Bryant and Shaquille O'Neal. Malone and Payton were perennial All-Stars; Payton had led the Seattle SuperSonics to the Finals in 1996, while Malone's Utah Jazz reached the Finals in 1997 and 1998. However, both had been defeated by Michael Jordan's Chicago Bulls. By 2003, Malone and Payton were in the latter stages of their respective careers and were no longer playing on championship-contending teams. Both Malone and Payton took pay cuts to sign with the Lakers in an effort to win a championship.

=== Game One ===
Sunday, June 6, 2004, 14:30 at the Staples Center.

Detroit stunned Los Angeles with imposing defense. They held the Lakers to 39% shooting. Outside of O'Neal and Bryant, the rest of the Lakers only managed to score 16 points.

The Pistons trailed the Lakers 41–40 at halftime, but a 10–4 surge in the third quarter gave them the lead and they never relinquished it. By the fourth quarter, their lead had increased to 13.

Box Score

Team	1st Qt.	2nd Qt.	3rd Qt.	4th Qt.	Total
Detroit	22	18	24	23	87
Los Angeles	19	22	17	17	75

=== Game Two ===
Tuesday, June 8, 2004, 15:04 at the Staples Center.

The Lakers led by eight after the first half. However, Detroit scored 30 points in the third quarter to keep the game close. With 2.1 seconds left in the fourth quarter, Kobe Bryant hit a three-point shot to tie the score at 89. The game went to overtime and the Lakers outscored the Pistons 10–2 to win their only game of the series.

Team	1st Qt.	2nd Qt.	3rd Qt.	4th Qt.	OT	Total
Detroit	16	20	30	23	2	91
Los Angeles	18	26	24	21	10	99

=== Game Three ===
Thursday, June 10, 2004, 14:31 at The Palace of Auburn Hills.

The Pistons beat the Lakers by 20 in their first NBA Finals appearance at The Palace of Auburn Hills since 1990 to take a 2–1 lead in the series. Karl Malone sprained his knee and was limited to 18 minutes. The 68 points scored by the Lakers set a franchise record for the fewest points scored in a playoff game. The previous night, a group of overzealous Pistons fans made it difficult for the Lakers to get their rest by harassing them until 4am at their hotel in nearby Birmingham. Fans were screaming outside the building until hotel management called the police.

Team	1st Qt.	2nd Qt.	3rd Qt.	4th Qt.	Total
Los Angeles	16	16	19	17	68
Detroit	24	15	24	25	88

=== Game Four ===
Sunday, June 13, 2004, 14:49 at The Palace of Auburn Hills.

The Pistons defeated the Lakers, this time by eight, to take a 3–1 series advantage. Shaquille O'Neal scored 36 points and grabbed 20 rebounds, but the rest of the Lakers shot 17/57 from the field.

Team	1st Qt.	2nd Qt.	3rd Qt.	4th Qt.	Total
Los Angeles	22	17	17	24	80
Detroit	21	20	15	32	88

=== Game Five ===
Tuesday, June 15, 2004, 14:32 at The Palace of Auburn Hills.

In Game 5, the Pistons won their first championship since 1990 and Larry Brown won his first title as an NBA coach. The Pistons defense had overcome the high-scoring Lakers offense, winning the game by 13 and the series 4–1. In four of the five games, the Lakers were held to less than 90 points.

After the series, Phil Jackson stepped down as coach (he would return for the 2005–06 season). Shaquille O'Neal was traded to Miami. Gary Payton and Rick Fox were traded to Boston. Karl Malone, who did not dress for Game 5, would have surgery on his knee and eventually retired the following February.

Team	1st Qt.	2nd Qt.	3rd Qt.	4th Qt.	Total
Los Angeles	24	21	14	28	87
Detroit	25	30	27	18	100

== Player stats ==
Legend
GP	Games played	GS	Games started	MPG	Minutes per game
FG%	Field-goal percentage	3P%	3-point field-goal percentage	FT%	Free-throw percentage
RPG	Rebounds per game	APG	Assists per game	SPG	Steals per game
BPG	Blocks per game	PPG	Points per game

=== Regular season ===
Player	GP	GS	MPG	FG%	3P%	FT%	RPG	APG	SPG	BPG	PPG
Kobe Bryant	65	64	37.6	.438	.327	.852	5.5	5.1	1.7	.4	24.0
Maurice Carter	4	0	12.5	.357	.333	.917	.8	.5	.0	.0	5.5
Brian Cook	35	2	12.6	.475	.000	.750	2.9	.6	.5	.5	4.4
Derek Fisher	82	3	21.6	.352	.291	.797	1.9	2.3	1.3	.0	7.1
Rick Fox	38	34	22.3	.392	.246	.733	2.7	2.6	.8	.1	4.8
Devean George	82	48	23.8	.408	.349	.760	4.0	1.4	1.0	.5	7.4
Horace Grant	55	10	20.1	.411	.000	.722	4.2	1.3	.4	.4	4.1
Karl Malone	42	42	32.7	.483	.000	.747	8.7	3.9	1.2	.5	13.2
Stanislav Medvedenko	68	38	21.2	.441	.000	.767	5.0	.8	.6	.3	8.3
Shaquille O'Neal	67	67	36.8	.584	.	.490	11.5	2.9	.5	2.5	21.5
Jannero Pargo	13	0	4.8	.375	.500	.	.5	.8	.2	.0	1.1
Gary Payton	82	82	34.5	.471	.333	.714	4.2	5.5	1.2	.2	14.6
Kareem Rush	72	15	17.3	.440	.348	.596	1.3	.8	.5	.3	6.4
Bryon Russell	72	1	13.1	.402	.384	.769	2.0	1.0	.4	.2	4.0
Jamal Sampson	10	2	13.0	.478	.	.583	5.2	.7	.2	.4	2.9
Ime Udoka	4	0	7.0	.333	.000	.500	1.3	.5	.5	.3	2.0
Luke Walton	72	2	10.1	.425	.333	.705	1.8	1.6	.4	.1	2.4

=== Playoffs ===
Player	GP	GS	MPG	FG%	3P%	FT%	RPG	APG	SPG	BPG	PPG
Kobe Bryant	22	22	44.2	.413	.247	.813	4.7	5.5	1.9	.3	24.5
Brian Cook	13	0	3.5	.333	.	1.000	.9	.1	.1	.0	.9
Derek Fisher	22	0	23.0	.405	.418	.657	2.5	2.2	.8	.0	7.5
Rick Fox	16	3	9.1	.400	.143	.500	1.4	1.1	.2	.1	1.1
Devean George	22	19	21.4	.430	.373	.650	2.3	.5	1.0	.4	5.5
Karl Malone	21	21	38.0	.450	.000	.630	8.8	3.4	1.1	.1	11.5
Stanislav Medvedenko	21	1	11.3	.440	.	.810	2.5	.5	.2	.2	4.0
Shaquille O'Neal	22	22	41.7	.593	.	.429	13.2	2.5	.3	2.8	21.5
Gary Payton	22	22	35.1	.366	.250	.750	3.3	5.3	1.0	.2	7.8
Kareem Rush	22	0	14.3	.385	.400	.667	.7	.8	.5	.1	3.7
Bryon Russell	6	0	2.7	.000	.000	.	.2	.3	.2	.0	.0
Luke Walton	17	0	7.9	.345	.385	.700	1.3	1.5	.4	.1	1.9

== Award winners ==
- Shaquille O'Neal, All-NBA First Team
- Kobe Bryant, All-NBA First Team
- Kobe Bryant, NBA All-Defensive First Team
- Shaquille O'Neal, NBA All-Star Game Most Valuable Player Award

== Transactions ==
During the offseason in July, the Lakers decided to trade their star center Shaquille O’Neal. The superstar big man was caught off guard by the news as he merely received a phone call during breakfast informing him of the move.
