= 2000–01 Los Angeles Lakers season =

Pro basketball team season (won NBA championship)

- NBA champions
- Conference champions
- Division champions
- Head coach: Phil Jackson
- General manager: Mitch Kupchak
- Owner: Jerry Buss
- Arena: Staples Center

Results
- Record: 56–26 (.683)
- Place: Division: 1st (Pacific); Conference: 2nd (Western)
- Playoff finish: NBA champions (Defeated 76ers 4–1)
- Stats at Basketball Reference

Local media
- Television: Fox Sports Net West, KCAL
- Radio: AM 570 KLAC

The 2000–01 Los Angeles Lakers season was the 53rd season for the Los Angeles Lakers in the National Basketball Association, and their 41st season in Los Angeles, California. The Lakers entered the regular season as the defending NBA champions, having defeated the Indiana Pacers in the 2000 NBA Finals in six games, winning their twelfth NBA championship.

== Season summary ==
=== Off-season ===
During the off-season, the Lakers acquired Horace Grant from the Seattle SuperSonics in a four-team trade; Grant won three NBA championships with the Chicago Bulls in the early 1990s. The team also signed free agent Isaiah Rider, who was released by the Atlanta Hawks during the previous season due to off-the-court troubles, and signed Greg Foster, who had two NBA Finals appearances with the Utah Jazz.

=== Regular season ===
The Lakers started the regular season without Derek Fisher, who was out due to a stress fracture in his right foot, which forced him to miss the first 62 games of the season. With the addition of Grant and Rider, and without Fisher, the Lakers got off to a 3–3 start to the season, but then won eight of their next nine games, and later on held a 31–16 record at the All-Star break. Fisher eventually returned as the team won their final eight games of the season, and won the Pacific Division title by finishing with a 56–26 record, and earning the second seed in the Western Conference. The team qualified for the NBA playoffs for the seventh consecutive year.

Shaquille O'Neal averaged 28.7 points, 12.7 rebounds and 2.7 blocks per game, and was named to the All-NBA First Team, while Kobe Bryant averaged 28.5 points, 5.9 rebounds and 5.0 assists per game, and was named to the All-NBA Second Team. In addition, Fisher provided the team with 11.5 points, 4.4 assists and 2.0 steals per game in only just 20 games, while Rick Fox contributed 9.6 points per game, and led the Lakers with 118 three-point field goals, and Grant provided with 8.5 points and 7.1 rebounds per game. Meanwhile, Rider contributed 7.6 points per game, Ron Harper averaged 6.5 points per game, but only played just 47 games due to knee injuries, Brian Shaw contributed 5.3 points per game, and Robert Horry provided with 5.2 points and 3.7 rebounds per game.

During the NBA All-Star weekend at the MCI Center in Washington, D.C., O'Neal and Bryant were both selected for the 2001 NBA All-Star Game, as members of the Western Conference All-Star team, although O'Neal did not participate due to a foot injury. Both O'Neal and Bryant were also selected to the NBA All-Defensive Second Team. O'Neal finished in third place in Most Valuable Player voting with 7 first-place votes, while Bryant finished in ninth place.

The Lakers finished eighth in the NBA in home-game attendance, with an attendance of 776,336 at the Staples Center during the regular season.

=== NBA playoffs ===
In the Western Conference First Round of the 2001 NBA playoffs, and for the second consecutive year, the Lakers faced off against the 7th–seeded Portland Trail Blazers, a team that featured All-Star forward Rasheed Wallace, Steve Smith and Scottie Pippen. The Lakers won the first two games over the Trail Blazers at home at the Staples Center, before winning Game 3 on the road, 99–86 at the Rose Garden Arena to win the series in a three-game sweep.

In the Western Conference Semi-finals, and also for the second consecutive year, the team faced off against the 3rd–seeded Sacramento Kings, who were led by All-Star forward Chris Webber, Peja Stojaković, and All-Star and former Lakers center, Vlade Divac. The Lakers won the first two games over the Kings at the Staples Center, and then won the next two games on the road, which included a Game 4 win over the Kings at the ARCO Arena II, 119–113 to win the series in a four-game sweep.

In the Western Conference Finals, the Lakers then faced off against the top–seeded, and Midwest Division champion San Antonio Spurs, who were led by All-Star forward Tim Duncan, All-Star center David Robinson, and Derek Anderson. Despite the Spurs having home-court advantage in the series, the Lakers won the first two games on the road at the Alamodome, and took a 2–0 series lead. In Game 3, the Lakers defeated the Spurs by a 39-point margin at home, 111–72 at the Staples Center, before winning Game 4 at home, 111–82 to win the series in another four-game sweep, and advance to the NBA Finals for the second consecutive year.

In the 2001 NBA Finals, the Lakers faced off against the top–seeded Philadelphia 76ers, who were led by All-Star guard, and Most Valuable Player of the Year, Allen Iverson, All-Star center and Defensive Player of the Year, Dikembe Mutombo, and Sixth Man of the Year, Aaron McKie. The Lakers lost Game 1 to the 76ers at home in overtime, 107–101 at the Staples Center, in which Iverson scored 48 points along with 5 steals. However, the Lakers managed to win Game 2 at home, 98–89 to even the series, before winning the next three games on the road, including a Game 5 win over the 76ers at the First Union Center, 108–96 to win the series in five games. The Lakers won their second consecutive NBA championship, earning the franchise its 13th championship overall, as O'Neal was named the NBA Finals Most Valuable Player for the second straight year. It was the second of the Lakers' three-peat championships to begin the millennium.

The Lakers also finished with the then-best postseason record in NBA history, posting a 15–1 record, suffering their only loss in Game 1 of the NBA Finals to the 76ers; that record would last for 16 years until the Golden State Warriors went 16–1 during the 2017 NBA playoffs.

=== Aftermath ===
Following the season, Grant re-signed as a free agent with his former team, the Orlando Magic, while Rider signed with the Denver Nuggets. Meanwhile, Tyronn Lue signed with the Washington Wizards, Foster was traded to the Milwaukee Bucks, and Harper retired.

== Draft picks ==
Round	Pick	Player	Position	Nationality	College
1	29	Mark Madsen	PF	United States	Stanford

== Roster ==
2000–01 Los Angeles Lakers roster
Players

Pos.	No.	Player	Height	Weight	DOB	From
G/F	8	Kobe Bryant	6 ft 6 in (1.98 m)	205 lb (93 kg)	1978–08–23	Lower Merion HS
G	2	Derek Fisher	6 ft 1 in (1.85 m)	210 lb (95 kg)	1974–08–09	Little Rock
C	40	Greg Foster	6 ft 11 in (2.11 m)	240 lb (109 kg)	1968–10–03	UTEP
F	17	Rick Fox	6 ft 7 in (2.01 m)	230 lb (104 kg)	1969–07–24	North Carolina
F	3	Devean George	6 ft 8 in (2.03 m)	235 lb (107 kg)	1977–08–29	Augsburg
F/C	54	Horace Grant	6 ft 10 in (2.08 m)	245 lb (111 kg)	1965–07–04	Clemson
G	4	Ron Harper	6 ft 6 in (1.98 m)	185 lb (84 kg)	1964–01–20	Miami (OH)
F	5	Robert Horry	6 ft 10 in (2.08 m)	240 lb (109 kg)	1970–08–25	Alabama
G	10	Tyronn Lue	6 ft 0 in (1.83 m)	175 lb (79 kg)	1977–05–03	Nebraska
F	35	Mark Madsen	6 ft 9 in (2.06 m)	240 lb (109 kg)	1976–01–28	Stanford
F	14	Slava Medvedenko	6 ft 10 in (2.08 m)	253 lb (115 kg)	1979–04–04	Ukraine
C	34	Shaquille O'Neal	7 ft 1 in (2.16 m)	325 lb (147 kg)	1972–03–06	LSU
G	12	Mike Penberthy	6 ft 3 in (1.91 m)	180 lb (82 kg)	1974–11–29	Master's
G	7	Isaiah Rider	6 ft 5 in (1.96 m)	215 lb (98 kg)	1971–03–12	UNLV
G	20	Brian Shaw	6 ft 6 in (1.98 m)	190 lb (86 kg)	1966–03–22	UC Santa Barbara

Coaches
Head coach
- Phil Jackson
Assistant(s)
- Bill Bertka
- Jim Cleamons
- Frank Hamblen
- Tex Winter

Legend
- (DP) Unsigned draft pick
- (FA) Free agent
- (S) Suspended
- Injured

Roster
Updated: October 2, 2000

== Regular Season ==
=== Season standings ===
Pacific Division	W	L	PCT	GB	Home	Road	Div
y-Los Angeles Lakers	56	26	.683	–	31–10	25–16	14–10
x-Sacramento Kings	55	27	.671	1	33–8	22–19	16–8
x-Phoenix Suns	51	31	.622	5	31–10	20–21	12–12
x-Portland Trail Blazers	50	32	.610	6	28–13	22–19	12–12
e-Seattle SuperSonics	44	38	.537	12	26–15	18–23	17–7
e-Los Angeles Clippers	31	51	378	25	22–19	9–32	9–15
e-Golden State Warriors	17	65	.207	39	11–30	6–35	4–20

Western Conference
#	Team	W	L	PCT	GB
1	z-San Antonio Spurs	58	24	.707	–
2	y-Los Angeles Lakers	56	26	.683	2
3	x-Sacramento Kings	55	27	.671	3
4	x-Utah Jazz	53	29	.646	5
5	x-Dallas Mavericks	53	29	.646	5
6	x-Phoenix Suns	51	31	.622	7
7	x-Portland Trail Blazers	50	32	.610	8
8	x-Minnesota Timberwolves	47	35	.573	11
9	e-Houston Rockets	45	37	.549	13
10	e-Seattle SuperSonics	44	38	.537	14
11	e-Denver Nuggets	40	42	.488	18
12	e-Los Angeles Clippers	31	51	.378	27
13	e-Vancouver Grizzlies	23	59	.280	35
14	e-Golden State Warriors	17	65	.207	41

z – clinched division title
y – clinched division title
x – clinched playoff spot

== Game log ==
=== Pre-season ===
2000 preseason game log
Total: 3–5
Preseason

Game	Date	Team	Score	High points	High rebounds	High assists	Location Attendance	Record
1	October 11	Charlotte	L 90-103	Kobe Bryant (19)	Shaquille O'Neal (9)	Tyronn Lue (5)	Lakefront Arena (New Orleans, LA); 16,994	0–1
2	October 12	Washington	L 87-90	Kobe Bryant (19)	Shaquille O'Neal (6)	Shawn Respert (4)	Pyramid Arena (Memphis, TN); 16,529	0–2
3	October 17	Phoenix	L 78-86	Shaquille O'Neal (28)	Kobe Bryant (10)	Isaiah Rider (4)	Arrowhead Pond (Anaheim, CA); 16,512	0–3
4	October 19	Cleveland	L 84-91	Kobe Bryant (18)	Shaquille O'Neal (8)	Shaquille O'Neal (4)	Staples Center; 15,717	0–4
5	October 20	Seattle	W 103-98	Kobe Bryant (22)	Shaquille O'Neal (19)	Fox & Rider (4)	Staples Center; 15,570	1–4
6	October 22	Golden State	W 94-87	Kobe Bryant (25)	Shaquille O'Neal (10)	Kobe Bryant (5)	San Diego Sports Arena (San Diego, CA); 13,252	2–4
7	October 23	Sacramento	L 111-118	Kobe Bryant (29)	Shaquille O'Neal (10)	Ron Harper (4)	Thomas & Mack Center (Las Vegas, NV); 17,561	2–5
8	October 26	@ Phoenix	W 98-84	Kobe Bryant (22)	Horace Grant (11)	Rick Fox (7)	American West Arena; 17,308	3–5

2000–01 season schedule

=== Regular season ===
2000–01 game log
Total: 56–26 (Home: 31–10; Road: 25–16)
October: 1–0 (home: 0–0; road: 1–0)

Game	Date	Team	Score	High points	High rebounds	High assists	Location Attendance	Record
1	October 31	@ Portland	W 96–86	Shaquille O'Neal (36)	Shaquille O'Neal (11)	Ron Harper (6)	Rose Garden; 20,270	1–0

November: 10–5 (home: 7–1; road: 3–4)

Game	Date	Team	Score	High points	High rebounds	High assists	Location Attendance	Record
2	November 1	Utah	L 92–97	Shaquille O'Neal (34)	Shaquille O'Neal (15)	Isaiah Rider (6)	Staples Center; 18,997	1–1
3	November 4	@ Vancouver	W 98–89	Shaquille O'Neal (27)	Shaquille O'Neal (15)	3 players tied (5)	General Motors Place; 18,183	2–1
4	November 5	L.A. Clippers	W 108–103	Shaquille O'Neal (39)	Shaquille O'Neal (14)	Kobe Bryant (6)	Staples Center; 18,997	3–1
5	November 7	@ Houston	L 74–84	Shaquille O'Neal (24)	Shaquille O'Neal (7)	Shaquille O'Neal (5)	Compaq Center; 14,473	3–2
6	November 8	@ San Antonio	L 81–91	Kobe Bryant (32)	Shaquille O'Neal (17)	Kobe Bryant (8)	Alamodome; 26,065	3–3
7	November 12	Houston	W 105–99	Kobe Bryant (37)	Kobe Bryant (10)	Brian Shaw (4)	Staples Center; 18,997	4–3
8	November 14	Denver	W 119–103	Shaquille O'Neal (34)	Shaquille O'Neal (19)	Kobe Bryant (9)	Staples Center; 18,997	5–3
9	November 16	@ Sacramento	W 112–110 (OT)	Shaquille O'Neal (33)	Shaquille O'Neal (16)	Brian Shaw (9)	ARCO Arena; 17,317	6–3
10	November 18	@ Denver	L 86–87	Kobe Bryant (32)	Horace Grant (12)	4 players tied (4)	Pepsi Center; 19,513	6–4
11	November 19	Chicago	W 104–96	Kobe Bryant (22)	Kobe Bryant (12)	Brian Shaw (7)	Staples Center; 18,997	7–4
12	November 22	Golden State	W 111–91	Kobe Bryant (31)	Shaquille O'Neal (14)	Kobe Bryant (7)	Staples Center; 18,208	8–4
13	November 24	Minnesota	W 115–108	Kobe Bryant (29)	Shaquille O'Neal (16)	Bryant & O'Neal (5)	Staples Center; 18,997	9–4
14	November 27	@ L.A. Clippers	W 98–83	Kobe Bryant (29)	3 players tied (7)	Rick Fox (5)	Staples Center; 20,039	10–4
15	November 28	Indiana	W 124–107	Kobe Bryant (37)	Shaquille O'Neal (14)	Fox & O'Neal (6)	Staples Center; 18,997	11–4
16	November 30	@ Seattle	L 88–121	Shaquille O'Neal (23)	Horace Grant (9)	Rick Fox (5)	KeyArena; 17,072	11–5

December: 11–5 (home: 5–3; road: 6–2)

Game	Date	Team	Score	High points	High rebounds	High assists	Location Attendance	Record
17	December 1	San Antonio	W 109–100	Kobe Bryant (43)	Shaquille O'Neal (16)	Bryant & Shaw (6)	Staples Center; 18,997	12–5
18	December 3	Dallas	W 99–97	Kobe Bryant (38)	Shaquille O'Neal (14)	Kobe Bryant (6)	Staples Center; 18,997	13–5
19	December 5	Philadelphia	W 96–85	Kobe Bryant (36)	Shaquille O'Neal (20)	Shaquille O'Neal (6)	Staples Center; 18,997	14–5
20	December 6	@ Golden State	L 122–125 (OT)	Kobe Bryant (51)	Harper & O'Neal (10)	Ron Harper (10)	The Arena in Oakland; 19,273	14–6
21	December 8	Seattle	L 95–103	Shaquille O'Neal (26)	Shaquille O'Neal (17)	Grant & O'Neal (5)	Staples Center; 18,997	14–7
22	December 10	Detroit	W 112–88	Bryant & O'Neal (26)	Shaquille O'Neal (12)	Bryant & Fox (9)	Staples Center; 18,997	15–7
23	December 12	Milwaukee	L 105–109	Shaquille O'Neal (26)	Shaquille O'Neal (17)	Bryant & O'Neal (6)	Staples Center; 18,997	15–8
24	December 13	@ Portland	L 86–96	Kobe Bryant (35)	Shaquille O'Neal (13)	Kobe Bryant (6)	Rose Garden; 20,491	15–9
25	December 15	Vancouver	W 98–76	Horace Grant (19)	Horace Grant (13)	Grant & Harper (5)	Staples Center; 18,211	16–9
26	December 17	@ Toronto	W 104–101 (OT)	Kobe Bryant (40)	Shaquille O'Neal (8)	Rick Fox (5)	Air Canada Centre; 19,800	17–9
27	December 19	@ Miami	W 81–79	Kobe Bryant (23)	Shaquille O'Neal (14)	Kobe Bryant (6)	American Airlines Arena; 19,600	18–9
28	December 21	@ Houston	W 99–94	Kobe Bryant (45)	Shaquille O'Neal (12)	Brian Shaw (7)	Compaq Center; 16,285	19–9
29	December 22	@ Dallas	W 108–103	Kobe Bryant (35)	Rick Fox (12)	Isaiah Rider (5)	Reunion Arena; 18,201	20–9
30	December 25	Portland	L 104–109	Shaquille O'Neal (32)	Shaquille O'Neal (15)	Kobe Bryant (6)	Staples Center; 18,997	20–10
31	December 28	@ Phoenix	W 115–78	Kobe Bryant (38)	Shaquille O'Neal (11)	Shaquille O'Neal (4)	America West Arena; 19,023	21–10
32	December 30	@ L.A. Clippers	W 116–114 (OT)	Shaquille O'Neal (29)	Shaquille O'Neal (15)	Rick Fox (9)	Staples Center; 20,327	22–10

January: 6–6 (home: 5–2; road: 1–4)

Game	Date	Team	Score	High points	High rebounds	High assists	Location Attendance	Record
33	January 3	Utah	W 82–71	Kobe Bryant (31)	Shaquille O'Neal (17)	Bryant & Fox (4)	Staples Center; 18,997	23–10
34	January 7	L.A. Clippers	L 95–118	Shaquille O'Neal (33)	Horace Grant (10)	Shaquille O'Neal (5)	Staples Center; 18,997	23–11
35	January 12	Cleveland	W 101–98	Shaquille O'Neal (34)	Shaquille O'Neal (23)	Bryant & Shaw (5)	Staples Center; 18,997	24–11
36	January 13	@ Utah	L 103–111	Shaquille O'Neal (30)	Shaquille O'Neal (12)	Harper & O'Neal (5)	Delta Center; 19,911	24–12
37	January 15	Vancouver	W 113–112 (OT)	Shaquille O'Neal (31)	Shaquille O'Neal (15)	Kobe Bryant (11)	Staples Center; 18,318	25–12
38	January 19	Houston	W 114–101	Shaquille O'Neal (41)	Shaquille O'Neal (11)	Brian Shaw (5)	Staples Center; 18,997	26–12
39	January 21	Miami	L 92–103	Kobe Bryant (34)	Bryant & O'Neal (8)	Shaquille O'Neal (3)	Staples Center; 18,997	26–13
40	January 23	@ Seattle	L 80–91	Shaquille O'Neal (29)	Shaquille O'Neal (9)	Kobe Bryant (5)	KeyArena; 17,072	26–14
41	January 26	New Jersey	W 113–101	Bryant & O'Neal (26)	Bryant & O'Neal (9)	Shaquille O'Neal (8)	Staples Center; 18,997	27–14
42	January 28	@ New York	L 81–91	Kobe Bryant (33)	Bryant & Horry (11)	Tyronn Lue (4)	Madison Square Garden; 19,763	27–15
43	January 30	@ Cleveland	W 102–96	Kobe Bryant (47)	Horace Grant (14)	Bryant & Harper (3)	Gund Arena; 20,253	28–15
44	January 31	@ Minnesota	L 83–96	Kobe Bryant (24)	Kobe Bryant (9)	Bryant & Horry (5)	Target Center; 19,006	28–16

February: 9–3 (home: 5–0; road: 4–3)

Game	Date	Team	Score	High points	High rebounds	High assists	Location Attendance	Record
45	February 2	Charlotte	W 93–87	Kobe Bryant (44)	Kobe Bryant (9)	Brian Shaw (4)	Staples Center; 18,710	29–16
46	February 4	Sacramento	W 100–94	Kobe Bryant (26)	Kobe Bryant (11)	Fox & Grant (5)	Staples Center; 18,997	30–16
47	February 7	Phoenix	W 85–83	Kobe Bryant (32)	Kobe Bryant (8)	Kobe Bryant (9)	Staples Center; 18,997	31–16
All-Star Break
48	February 13	@ New Jersey	W 113–110 (OT)	Kobe Bryant (38)	Shaquille O'Neal (14)	Fox & O'Neal (6)	Continental Airlines Arena; 20,049	32–16
49	February 14	@ Philadelphia	L 97–112	Shaquille O'Neal (29)	Shaquille O'Neal (11)	Kobe Bryant (7)	First Union Center; 21,005	32–17
50	February 16	@ Charlotte	W 99–94	Shaquille O'Neal (38)	Shaquille O'Neal (12)	Kobe Bryant (10)	Charlotte Coliseum; 19,925	33–17
51	February 18	@ Indiana	L 109–110	Shaquille O'Neal (35)	Shaquille O'Neal (15)	Kobe Bryant (9)	Conseco Fieldhouse; 18,345	33–18
52	February 20	@ Dallas	W 119–109	Shaquille O'Neal (29)	Horace Grant (12)	Kobe Bryant (7)	Reunion Arena; 18,287	34–18
53	February 21	@ San Antonio	W 101–99	Shaquille O'Neal (22)	Shaquille O'Neal (10)	Shaquille O'Neal (7)	Alamodome; 29,849	35–18
54	February 23	Atlanta	W 113–106	Shaquille O'Neal (30)	Horry & O'Neal (8)	Fox & O'Neal (8)	Staples Center; 18,997	36–18
55	February 25	Orlando	W 106–100	Shaquille O'Neal (37)	Shaquille O'Neal (19)	Shaquille O'Neal (6)	Staples Center; 18,997	37–18
56	February 28	@ Denver	L 101–107	Kobe Bryant (38)	Shaquille O'Neal (11)	Rick Fox (8)	Pepsi Center; 19,566	37–19

March: 11–6 (home: 5–3; road: 6–3)

Game	Date	Team	Score	High points	High rebounds	High assists	Location Attendance	Record
57	March 3	@ Vancouver	W 98–88	Shaquille O'Neal (34)	Horace Grant (15)	Brian Shaw (9)	General Motors Place; 19,193	38–19
58	March 4	Golden State	W 110–95	Shaquille O'Neal (26)	Shaquille O'Neal (15)	Kobe Bryant (5)	Staples Center; 18,997	39–19
59	March 6	@ Golden State	W 97–85	Kobe Bryant (29)	Shaquille O'Neal (17)	Brian Shaw (9)	The Arena in Oakland; 20,181	40–19
60	March 7	Toronto	W 97–85	Kobe Bryant (29)	3 players tied (10)	Bryant & Shaw (5)	Staples Center; 18,997	41–19
61	March 9	San Antonio	L 89–93 (OT)	Kobe Bryant (38)	Shaquille O'Neal (16)	4 players tied (2)	Staples Center; 18,997	41–20
62	March 11	Seattle	L 97–109 (OT)	Shaquille O'Neal (29)	Brian Shaw (10)	Brian Shaw (7)	Staples Center; 18,997	41–21
63	March 13	Boston	W 112–107	Shaquille O'Neal (28)	Brian Shaw (12)	Derek Fisher (8)	Staples Center; 18,997	42–21
64	March 15	@ Detroit	W 125–119 (OT)	Kobe Bryant (39)	Shaquille O'Neal (10)	Kobe Bryant (7)	The Palace of Auburn Hills; 22,076	43–21
65	March 16	@ Washington	W 101–89	Kobe Bryant (26)	Robert Horry (9)	Derek Fisher (6)	MCI Center; 20,674	44–21
66	March 18	@ Orlando	W 95–90	Shaquille O'Neal (33)	Shaquille O'Neal (17)	Kobe Bryant (7)	TD Waterhouse Centre; 17,248	45–21
67	March 19	@ Atlanta	L 106–108	Bryant & O'Neal (27)	Shaquille O'Neal (13)	Derek Fisher (6)	Philips Arena; 17,248	45–22
68	March 21	@ Milwaukee	L 100–107	Shaquille O'Neal (36)	Shaquille O'Neal (13)	Kobe Bryant (8)	Bradley Center; 18,717	45–23
69	March 23	Washington	W 104–91	Shaquille O'Neal (40)	Shaquille O'Neal (17)	Shaquille O'Neal (8)	Staples Center; 18,997	46–23
70	March 25	@ Sacramento	W 84–72	Shaquille O'Neal (23)	Shaquille O'Neal (15)	Fox & Shaw (4)	ARCO Arena; 17,317	47–23
71	March 26	@ Phoenix	L 83–104	Shaquille O'Neal (27)	Shaquille O'Neal (12)	O'Neal & Shaw (3)	America West Arena; 19,023	47–24
72	March 28	Sacramento	L 84–108	Shaquille O'Neal (33)	Shaquille O'Neal (11)	Rick Fox (8)	Staples Center; 18,997	47–25
73	March 30	Dallas	W 98–89	Shaquille O'Neal (35)	Shaquille O'Neal (13)	Rick Fox (8)	Staples Center; 18,997	48–25

April: 8–1 (home: 4–1; road: 4–0)

Game	Date	Team	Score	High points	High rebounds	High assists	Location Attendance	Record
74	April 1	New York	L 78–79	Shaquille O'Neal (31)	Horace Grant (12)	Rick Fox (4)	Staples Center; 18,997	48–26
75	April 3	@ Utah	W 96–88	Shaquille O'Neal (31)	Shaquille O'Neal (11)	3 players tied (5)	Delta Center; 19,911	49–26
76	April 5	@ Chicago	W 100–88	Shaquille O'Neal (39)	Shaquille O'Neal (10)	Derek Fisher (7)	United Center; 23,217	50–26
77	April 6	@ Boston	W 100–96	Shaquille O'Neal (39)	Shaquille O'Neal (14)	Brian Shaw (9)	FleetCenter; 18,624	51–26
78	April 8	@ Minnesota	W 104–99	Shaquille O'Neal (34)	Shaquille O'Neal (11)	Brian Shaw (7)	Target Center; 20,099	52–26
79	April 10	Phoenix	W 106–80	Shaquille O'Neal (32)	Shaquille O'Neal (13)	Brian Shaw (10)	Staples Center; 18,997	53–26
80	April 12	Minnesota	W 119–102	Shaquille O'Neal (31)	Shaquille O'Neal (12)	Kobe Bryant (9)	Staples Center; 18,997	54–26
81	April 15	Portland	W 105–100	Shaquille O'Neal (33)	Shaquille O'Neal (18)	Kobe Bryant (7)	Staples Center; 18,997	55–26
82	April 17	Denver	W 108–91	Shaquille O'Neal (33)	Shaquille O'Neal (13)	Kobe Bryant (5)	Staples Center; 18,997	56–26

2000–01 season schedule

=== Playoffs ===
2001 playoff game log
Total: 15–1 (Home: 7–1; Road: 8–0)
First round: 3–0 (home: 2–0; road: 1–0)

Game	Date	Team	Score	High points	High rebounds	High assists	Location Attendance	Series
1	April 22	Portland	W 106–93	Kobe Bryant (28)	Shaquille O'Neal (20)	Kobe Bryant (7)	Staples Center; 18,997	1–0
2	April 26	Portland	W 106–88	Shaquille O'Neal (32)	Shaquille O'Neal (12)	Kobe Bryant (7)	Staples Center; 18,997	2–0
3	April 29	@ Portland	W 99–86	Shaquille O'Neal (25)	Shaquille O'Neal (15)	Kobe Bryant (9)	Rose Garden; 20,580	3–0

Conference Semi-finals: 4–0 (home: 2–0; road: 2–0)

Game	Date	Team	Score	High points	High rebounds	High assists	Location Attendance	Series
1	May 6	Sacramento	W 108–105	Shaquille O'Neal (44)	Shaquille O'Neal (21)	Kobe Bryant (5)	Staples Center; 18,997	1–0
2	May 8	Sacramento	W 96–90	Shaquille O'Neal (43)	Shaquille O'Neal (20)	Rick Fox (7)	Staples Center; 18,997	2–0
3	May 11	@ Sacramento	W 103–81	Kobe Bryant (36)	Shaquille O'Neal (18)	Brian Shaw (6)	ARCO Arena; 17,317	3–0
4	May 13	@ Sacramento	W 119–113	Kobe Bryant (48)	Kobe Bryant (16)	Brian Shaw (5)	ARCO Arena; 17,317	4–0

Conference Finals: 4–0 (home: 2–0; road: 2–0)

Game	Date	Team	Score	High points	High rebounds	High assists	Location Attendance	Series
1	May 19	@ San Antonio	W 104–90	Kobe Bryant (45)	Shaquille O'Neal (11)	Horace Grant (6)	Alamodome; 36,068	1–0
2	May 21	@ San Antonio	W 88–81	Kobe Bryant (28)	Shaquille O'Neal (14)	Kobe Bryant (6)	Alamodome; 35,574	2–0
3	May 25	San Antonio	W 111–72	Kobe Bryant (36)	Shaquille O'Neal (17)	Kobe Bryant (8)	Staples Center; 18,997	3–0
4	May 27	San Antonio	W 111–82	Derek Fisher (28)	Shaquille O'Neal (10)	Kobe Bryant (11)	Staples Center; 18,997	4–0

NBA Finals: 4–1 (home: 1–1; road: 3–0)

Game	Date	Team	Score	High points	High rebounds	High assists	Location Attendance	Series
1	June 6	Philadelphia	L 101–107 (OT)	Shaquille O'Neal (44)	Shaquille O'Neal (20)	3 players tied (5)	Staples Center; 18,997	0–1
2	June 8	Philadelphia	W 98–89	Kobe Bryant (31)	Shaquille O'Neal (20)	Shaquille O'Neal (9)	Staples Center; 18,997	1–1
3	June 10	@ Philadelphia	W 96–91	Kobe Bryant (32)	Shaquille O'Neal (12)	4 players tied (3)	First Union Center; 20,900	2–1
4	June 13	@ Philadelphia	W 100–86	Shaquille O'Neal (34)	Shaquille O'Neal (14)	Kobe Bryant (9)	First Union Center; 20,896	3–1
5	June 15	@ Philadelphia	W 108–96	Shaquille O'Neal (29)	Shaquille O'Neal (13)	Bryant & Fox (6)	First Union Center; 20,890	4–1

2001 schedule

== NBA Finals ==
- By winning the Finals MVP award, Shaquille O'Neal joined the list of Kareem Abdul-Jabbar, Magic Johnson, Larry Bird, Michael Jordan, and Hakeem Olajuwon as the only players to win the award at least twice. Tim Duncan, Kobe Bryant, LeBron James, Kevin Durant, and Kawhi Leonard have since joined the list. Jordan, Olajuwon, O'Neal, Bryant, James, and Durant are the only six to win the award in back-to-back years.
- The Lakers at the time had achieved the best ever NBA postseason record of 15–1, sweeping the Western Conference and then sweeping the 76ers after their Game 1 loss in the Finals. On June 12, 2017, the Golden State Warriors had surpassed this feat, as they would go 16–1, after beating the Cleveland Cavaliers in the 2017 NBA Finals. The Lakers' postseason record was made before the first round of playoffs was extended to be the best-of-7 format which was implemented in the 2003 NBA Playoffs.
- This Laker team still holds the title of best road record in a single postseason, at 8–0.

=== Summary ===
The following scoring summary is written in a line score format, except that the quarter numbers are replaced by game numbers.

Team	Game 1*	Game 2	Game 3	Game 4	Game 5	Wins
Los Angeles (West)	101	98	96	100	108	4
Philadelphia (East)	107	89	91	86	96	1

∗ denotes a game that required overtime.

== Player statistics ==
Legend
GP	Games played	GS	Games started	MPG	Minutes per game
FG%	Field-goal percentage	3P%	3-point field-goal percentage	FT%	Free-throw percentage
RPG	Rebounds per game	APG	Assists per game	SPG	Steals per game
BPG	Blocks per game	PPG	Points per game

=== Regular season ===
Player	GP	GS	MPG	FG%	3P%	FT%	RPG	APG	SPG	BPG	PPG
Kobe Bryant	68	68	40.9	.464	.305	.853	5.9	5.0	1.68	.63	28.5
Derek Fisher	20	20	35.5	.412	.397	.806	3.0	4.4	1.95	.10	11.5
Greg Foster	62	8	7.3	.421	.333	.714	1.8	.5	.15	.19	2.0
Rick Fox	82	77	27.9	.444	.393	.779	4.0	3.2	.85	.35	9.6
Devean George	59	1	10.1	.309	.221	.709	1.9	.3	.25	.25	3.1
Horace Grant	77	77	31.0	.462	.000	.775	7.1	1.6	.66	.79	8.5
Ron Harper	47	46	24.2	.469	.264	.708	3.5	2.4	.83	.53	6.5
Robert Horry	79	1	20.1	.387	.346	.711	3.7	1.6	.68	.68	5.2
Tyronn Lue	38	1	12.3	.427	.324	.792	.8	1.2	.50	.00	3.4
Mark Madsen	70	3	9.2	.487	1.000	.703	2.2	.3	.11	.11	2.0
Slava Medvedenko	7	0	5.6	.480	1.000	.583	1.3	.3	.14	.14	4.6
Shaquille O'Neal	74	74	39.5	.572	.000	.513	12.7	3.7	.64	2.76	28.7
Mike Penberthy	53	0	16.1	.414	.396	.903	1.2	1.3	.42	.04	5.0
Isaiah Rider	67	6	18.0	.426	.370	.855	2.3	1.7	.40	.10	7.6
Brian Shaw	80	28	22.9	.399	.311	.797	3.8	3.2	.61	.34	5.3

=== Playoffs ===
Player	GP	GS	MPG	FG%	3P%	FT%	RPG	APG	SPG	BPG	PPG
Kobe Bryant	16	16	43.4	.469	.324	.821	7.3	6.1	1.56	.75	29.4
Derek Fisher	16	16	36.0	.484	.515	.765	3.8	3.0	1.31	.06	13.4
Greg Foster	1	0	3.0	.000	.000	.000	1.0	.0	.00	.00	.0
Rick Fox	16	16	35.8	.450	.316	.867	4.9	3.6	1.94	.44	10.0
Devean George	7	0	3.9	.500	.500	.500	.7	.1	.00	.00	2.0
Horace Grant	16	16	26.4	.385	.000	.733	6.0	1.2	.94	.81	6.0
Ron Harper	6	0	7.0	.500	.250	.667	1.3	.7	.67	.17	2.2
Robert Horry	16	0	23.9	.368	.362	.591	5.2	1.9	1.38	1.00	5.9
Tyronn Lue	15	0	8.7	.345	.385	.800	.7	.7	.80	.07	1.9
Mark Madsen	13	0	3.7	.077	.000	.600	.8	.3	.00	.15	.4
Shaquille O'Neal	16	16	42.3	.555	.000	.525	15.4	3.2	.44	2.38	30.4
Brian Shaw	16	0	18.1	.375	.345	.667	3.4	2.7	.63	.06	4.4

Player statistics citation:

== Award winners ==
- Kobe Bryant, All-NBA Second Team
- Kobe Bryant, All-NBA Defensive Second Team
- Shaquille O'Neal, Center, NBA Finals Most Valuable Player
- Shaquille O'Neal, League Leader, FG%, 57.2
- Shaquille O'Neal, All-NBA First Team
- Shaquille O'Neal, All-NBA Defensive Second Team
