= Devean George =

American basketball player (born 1977)

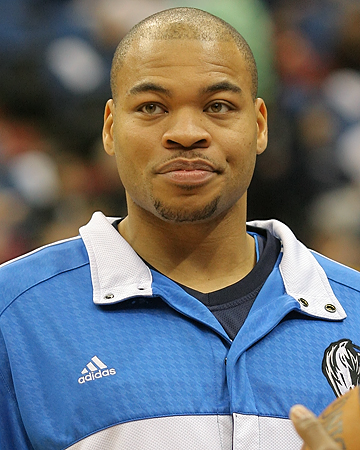
- George with the Dallas Mavericks in 2008

Personal information
- Born: August 29, 1977 (age 49) Minneapolis, Minnesota, U.S.
- Listed height: 6 ft 8 in (2.03 m)
- Listed weight: 235 lb (107 kg)

Career information
- High school: Benilde-St. Margaret's (St. Louis Park, Minnesota)
- College: Augsburg (1995–1999)
- NBA draft: 1999: 1st round, 23rd overall pick
- Drafted by: Los Angeles Lakers
- Playing career: 1999–2010
- Position: Small forward
- Number: 3, 40, 19

Career history
- 1999–2006: Los Angeles Lakers
- 2006–2009: Dallas Mavericks
- 2009–2010: Golden State Warriors

Career highlights
- 3× NBA champion (2000–2002); Second-team Division III All-American – NABC (1999); 2× MIAC Player of the Year (1998, 1999); 3× All-MIAC (1997–1999)

Career NBA statistics
- Points: 3,536 (5.6 ppg)
- Rebounds: 1,975 (3.1 rpg)
- Assists: 543 (0.9 apg)
- Stats at NBA.com
- Stats at Basketball Reference

Devean Jamar George (born August 29, 1977) is an American former professional basketball player who played 11 seasons in the National Basketball Association (NBA), mostly as a backup small forward. He won three NBA championships during his time with the Los Angeles Lakers. Since completing his basketball career George has become a real estate developer in his home state of Minnesota.

== Early life ==
Devean Jamar George was born on August 29, 1977, in Minneapolis, Minnesota. He attended high school at Benilde-St. Margaret's School in St. Louis Park, Minnesota, where he played basketball.

== College career ==
George attended Augsburg College. He was named Minnesota Intercollegiate Athletic Conference Most Valuable Player two consecutive years (1997–98 and 1998–99), and set school records as a senior by scoring 770 points and averaging 27.5 ppg in leading Augsburg to 24–4 record and the NCAA Division III tournament for the second year in a row.

George grew up in Near North, Minneapolis.

== Professional career ==
=== Los Angeles Lakers (1999–2006) ===
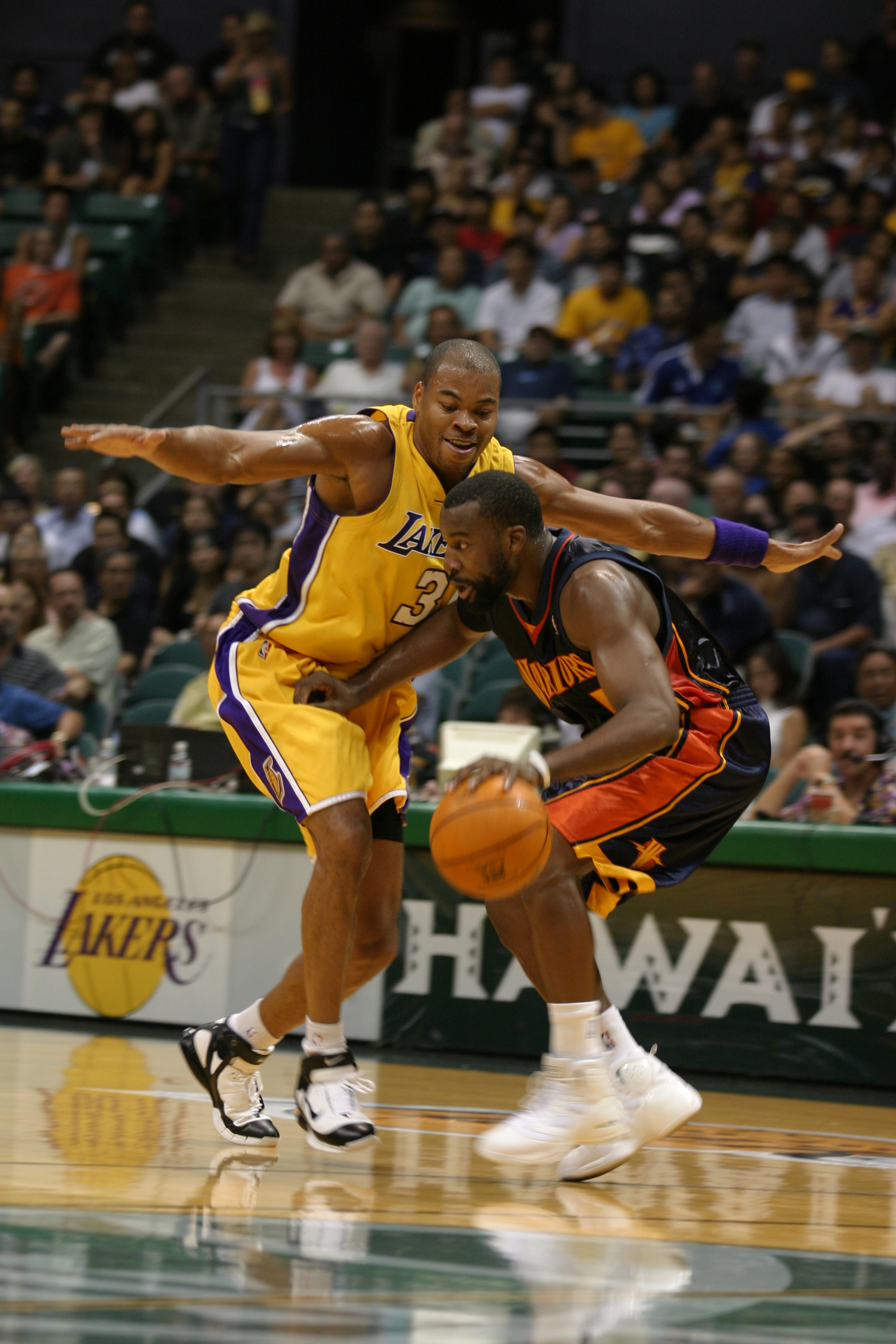
George (left) with the Lakers in 2005, defending against Baron Davis

George was taken by the Los Angeles Lakers with the 23rd overall pick of the 1999 NBA draft, and showed considerable promise, especially by his third season where his hustle, outside shooting, and defense made him a key substitute and he appeared in every single game. George was a contributor to the Los Angeles Lakers three straight championship seasons, playing a solid role as a reserve behind Rick Fox. The Lakers gave him a contract extension in 2002 as a result and over the years, his effort, defensive activity, three-point shooting, and willingness to do what the Lakers required of him endeared him to many Laker fans.

=== Dallas Mavericks (2006–2009) ===
George signed a two-year $4.2 million contract with the Dallas Mavericks as a free agent in August 2006 and as the season continued he gained coach Avery Johnson's trust and became more integral to the Mavericks' gameplan.

After the end of the 2006–07 NBA season, George became an unrestricted free agent. The Mavericks gave him and his agent a chance to opt in or opt out of a possible second season with the Mavericks at $2.16 m. On June 30, George decided to opt out of a second season with the Mavericks but eventually, with no other choices, re-signed on July 9 to a $2.5 million deal.

In February 2008, George received a lot of publicity when he refused to be included as part of a larger trade which would have sent Jason Kidd to the Mavericks and George, alongside six other players, to the New Jersey Nets. The trade was ultimately completed without George being part of it, with George being replaced by Trenton Hassell.

On March 11, 2009, George injured his right knee in a game against the Portland Trail Blazers. On March 27, George had arthroscopic surgery to remove loose fragments of cartilage from the injured knee. George had the option to become a free agent at the end of the season, but chose to exercise his player option to remain with the team.

=== Golden State Warriors (2009–2010) ===
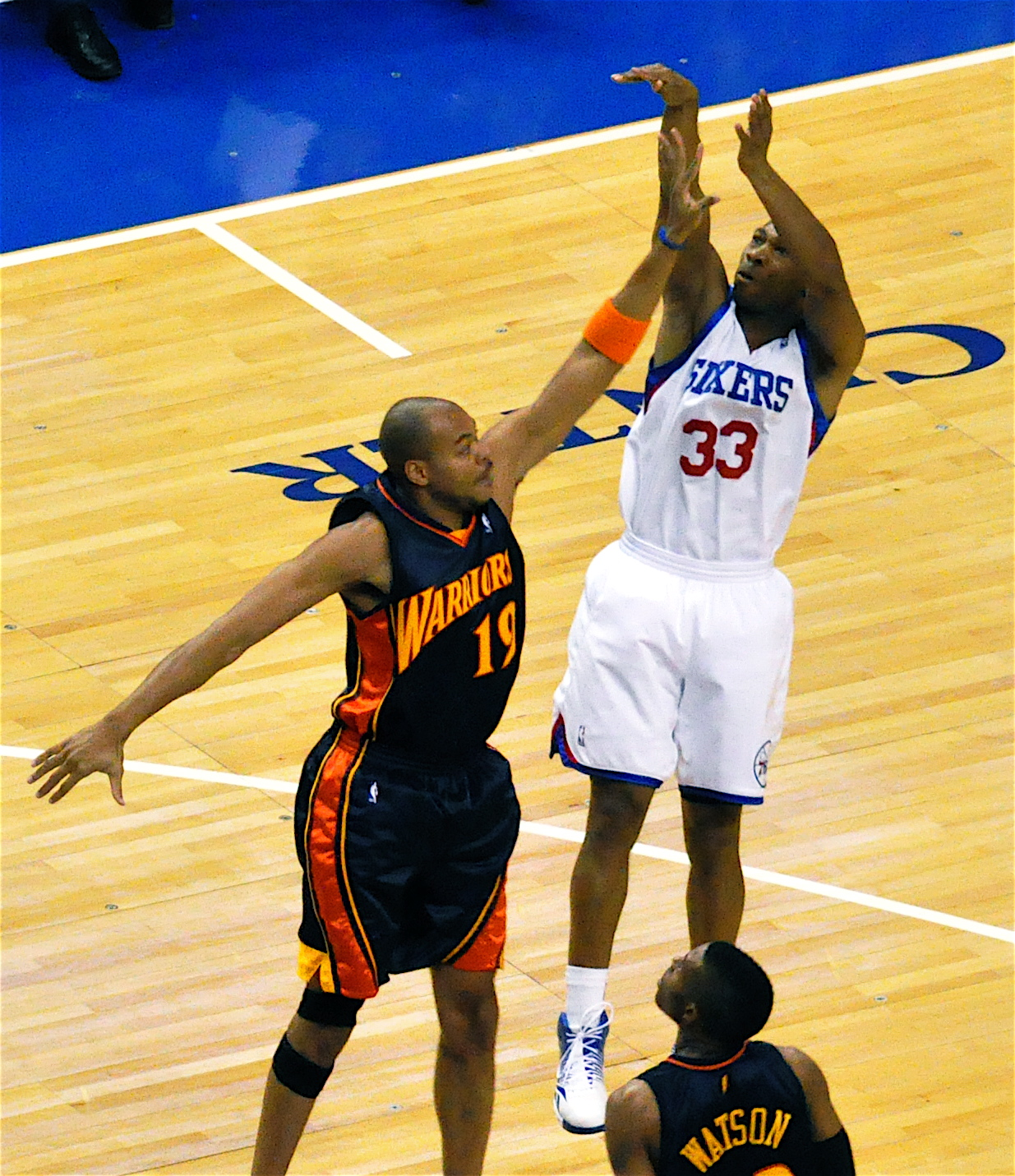
George (left) with the Golden State Warriors in 2009

On July 8, 2009, George was a part of a three-team trade that sent him and Antoine Wright to the Toronto Raptors, Shawn Marion and Kris Humphries to the Mavericks and Jerry Stackhouse to the Memphis Grizzlies. George was later traded to the Golden State Warriors along with cash considerations on July 30, 2009, for Marco Belinelli.

George tried out for his hometown Minnesota Timberwolves in December 2011 after the NBA lockout of that year ended. He did not make their final roster.

== After basketball ==
In 2012, George announced a proposal for an affordable apartment project in Minneapolis. George has developed two affordable housing projects in North Minneapolis, where he grew up. In 2022 he proposed a modular housing manufacturing facility in the North Loop of Minneapolis.

On September 7, 2014, Devean and three former Augsburg teammates captured the Gus Macker 3-on-3 "Next Step Down" bracket, championship in St. Paul, Minnesota.

== NBA career statistics ==
Legend
GP	Games played	GS	Games started	MPG	Minutes per game
FG%	Field goal percentage	3P%	3-point field goal percentage	FT%	Free throw percentage
RPG	Rebounds per game	APG	Assists per game	SPG	Steals per game
BPG	Blocks per game	PPG	Points per game	**Bold**	Career high
†	Won an NBA championship

=== Regular season ===
Year	Team	GP	GS	MPG	FG%	3P%	FT%	RPG	APG	SPG	BPG	PPG
1999–00†	L.A. Lakers	49	1	7.0	.389	.340	.659	1.5	.2	.2	.1	3.2
2000–01†	L.A. Lakers	59	1	10.1	.309	.221	.709	1.9	.3	.2	.2	3.1
2001–02†	L.A. Lakers	**82**	1	21.5	.411	.371	.675	3.7	**1.4**	.9	**.5**	7.1
2002–03	L.A. Lakers	71	7	22.7	.390	.371	**.790**	**4.0**	1.3	.8	**.5**	6.9
2003–04	L.A. Lakers	**82**	**48**	**23.8**	.408	.349	.760	**4.0**	**1.4**	**1.0**	**.5**	**7.4**
2004–05	L.A. Lakers	15	3	20.4	.356	.362	.750	3.5	.9	.5	.1	7.3
2005–06	L.A. Lakers	71	5	21.7	.400	.313	.674	3.9	1.0	.9	**.5**	6.3
2006–07	Dallas	60	17	21.4	.395	.353	.750	3.6	.6	.8	.4	6.4
2007–08	Dallas	53	4	15.5	.357	.324	.706	2.6	.7	.4	.2	3.7
2008–09	Dallas	43	17	16.5	.380	.289	.773	1.8	.3	.5	.3	3.4
2009–10	Golden State	45	4	16.9	**.432**	**.390**	.696	2.5	.7	.9	.2	5.4
Career		630	108	18.5	.392	.343	.721	3.1	.9	.7	.4	5.6

=== Playoffs ===
Year	Team	GP	GS	MPG	FG%	3P%	FT%	RPG	APG	SPG	BPG	PPG
2000†	L.A. Lakers	9	0	5.0	.368	.200	.545	1.1	.2	.1	.0	2.4
2001†	L.A. Lakers	7	0	3.9	**.500**	**.500**	.500	.7	.1	.0	.0	2.0
2002†	L.A. Lakers	19	0	17.2	.365	.229	.733	3.6	.6	.6	**.5**	5.0
2003	L.A. Lakers	11	7	**28.9**	.449	.333	**.889**	**4.5**	**2.2**	**1.0**	.4	**8.0**
2004	L.A. Lakers	**22**	**19**	21.4	.430	.373	.650	2.3	.5	.9	.4	5.5
2006	L.A. Lakers	7	0	17.3	.382	.429	.400	2.3	.6	.6	.1	5.3
2007	Dallas	6	1	18.2	.200	.250	.800	3.0	.7	**1.0**	.3	3.5
2008	Dallas	5	0	12.4	.393	.333	.600	3.0	.0	.4	.4	5.8
Career		86	27	17.2	.395	.326	.675	2.7	.7	.6	.3	5.0
