= Horace Grant =

American basketball player (born 1965)

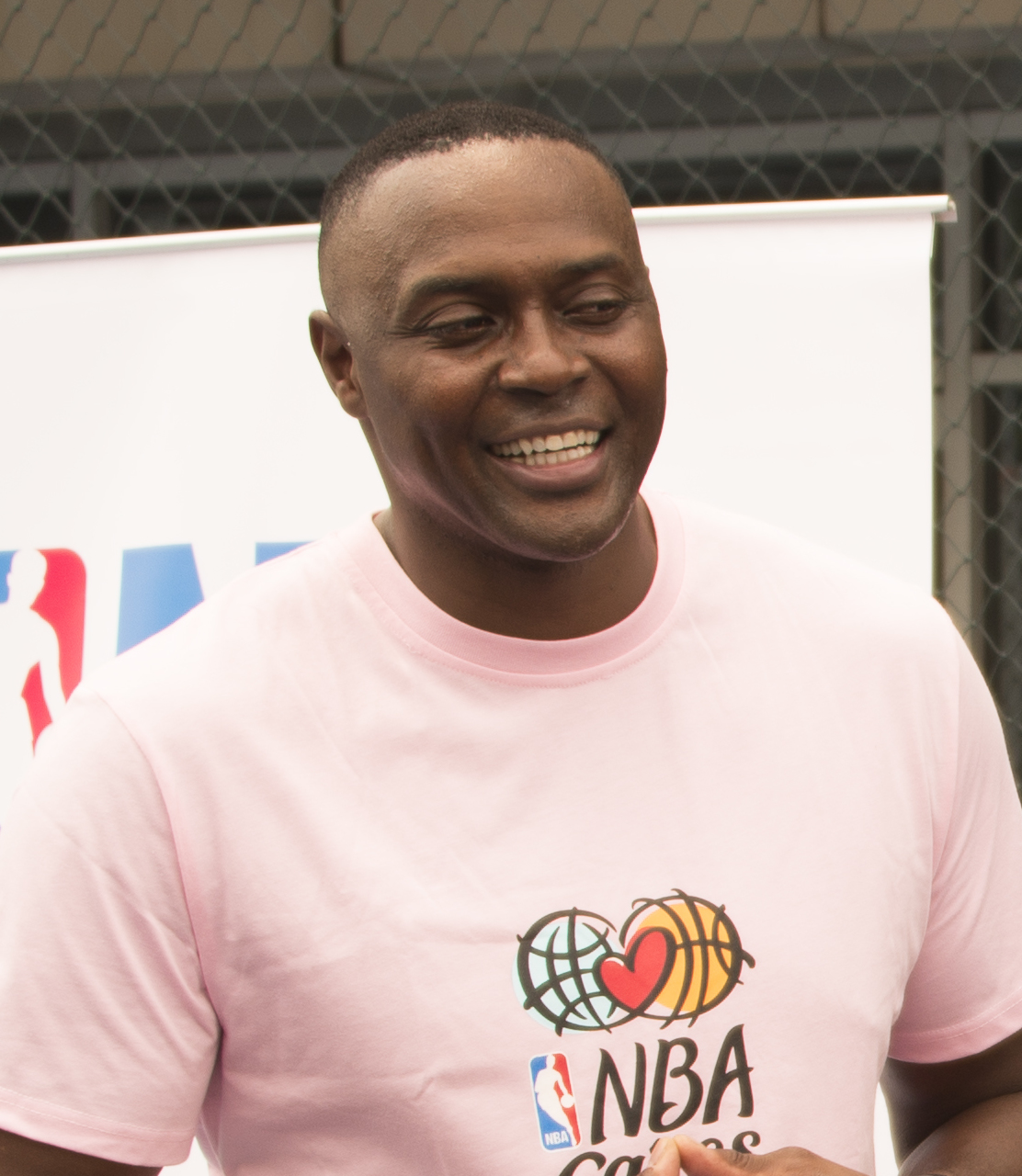
- Grant in 2014

Chicago Bulls
- Title: Special advisor
- League: NBA

Personal information
- Born: July 4, 1965 (age 61) Augusta, Georgia, U.S.
- Listed height: 6 ft 10 in (2.08 m)
- Listed weight: 245 lb (111 kg)

Career information
- High school: Hancock Central (Sparta, Georgia)
- College: Clemson (1983–1987)
- NBA draft: 1987: 1st round, 10th overall pick
- Drafted by: Chicago Bulls
- Playing career: 1987–2004
- Position: Power forward / center
- Number: 54

Career history
- 1987–1994: Chicago Bulls
- 1994–1999: Orlando Magic
- 1999–2000: Seattle SuperSonics
- 2000–2001: Los Angeles Lakers
- 2001–2002: Orlando Magic
- 2003–2004: Los Angeles Lakers

Career highlights
- 4× NBA champion (1991–1993, 2001); NBA All-Star (1994); 4× NBA All-Defensive Second Team (1993–1996); Consensus second-team All-American (1987); ACC Player of the Year (1987); First-team All-ACC (1987)

Career statistics
- Points: 12,996 (11.2 ppg)
- Rebound: 9,443 (8.1 rpg)
- Assists: 2,575 (2.2 apg)
- Stats at NBA.com
- Stats at Basketball Reference

Horace Junior Grant Sr. (born July 4, 1965) is an American former professional basketball player who is a special advisor to Michael Reinsdorf, the president and chief operating officer of the Chicago Bulls. He played college basketball for the Clemson Tigers before playing professionally in the National Basketball Association (NBA), where he became a four-time champion, winning three championships with the Chicago Bulls and one championship with the Los Angeles Lakers. Horace is the twin brother of former NBA player Harvey Grant. Horace made an NBA All-Star Game in 1994.

== Early life ==
Grant was born on July 4, 1965, in Augusta, Georgia. He and his twin brother, Harvey, grew up in Hancock County, Georgia, and attended school in Sparta, Georgia.

== College career ==
Grant attended Clemson University, where he was a member of Pi Kappa Alpha. With the Tigers, he became the first player in ACC history to lead the league in scoring (21.0 average), rebounding (9.6) and field goal shooting (70.8 percent). In 1987, Grant helped lead Clemson to the NCAA Tournament and was named ACC Player of the Year, becoming the first Clemson player to receive that honor.

== Professional career ==
=== Chicago Bulls (1987–1994) ===
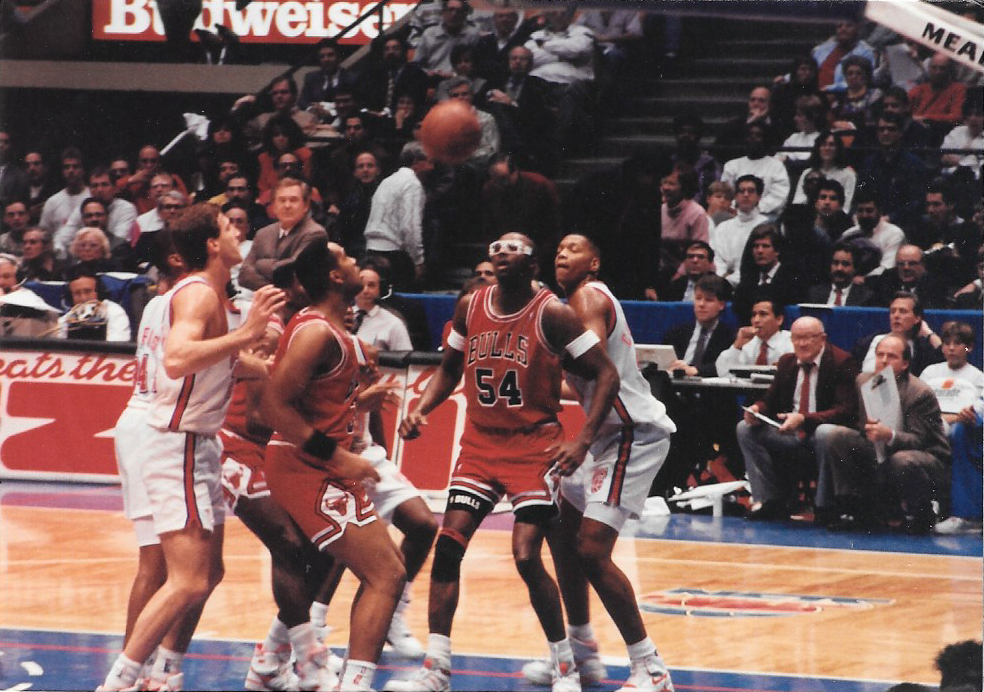
The Chicago Bulls and New Jersey Nets at the Meadowlands Arena on March 28, 1991. Grant is in the center of the image, wearing number 54.

Grant was drafted by the Chicago Bulls with the 10th overall pick of the 1987 NBA draft. The 6 ft 10 in (2.08 m) power forward / center teamed with fellow draft-day acquisition Scottie Pippen to form the Bulls' forward tandem of the future, although he initially backed up incumbent Charles Oakley, one of the league's premier rebounders and post defenders.

In 1988, Grant moved into the starting lineup when Oakley was traded to the New York Knicks for center Bill Cartwright. He immediately became the Bulls' main rebounder, and established himself as the Bulls' third scoring option after Michael Jordan and Pippen, forming one of the league's best trios. Grant was noted for his defensive play; he was selected four times for the NBA All-Defensive Team. He helped Chicago win three consecutive NBA championships (1991, 1992, and 1993), securing the third with a last-second block on Kevin Johnson.

Grant, who was diagnosed with myopia and wore eyeglasses, began wearing goggles fitted with prescription lenses on the court starting with the 1990–91 season. The goggles soon became a trademark for Grant. Although he eventually received LASIK surgery to correct his sight, he continued to wear the goggles on the court after he had heard from parents that he had become an inspirational figure to children who wore eyeglasses.

After Jordan's first retirement following the 1992–93 season, Grant became the number-two star behind Pippen, and helped the Bulls push the Knicks to seven games in the second-round playoff series before being eliminated. Grant played in the 1994 NBA All-Star Game, posting four points and eight rebounds in 17 minutes. During the 1993–94 season he recorded career-best averages in scoring (15.1), rebounding (11.0), and assists (3.4).

=== Orlando Magic (1994–1999) ===
Grant left the Bulls as a free agent and joined the Orlando Magic, led by Shaquille O'Neal and Penny Hardaway. On May 5, 1995, Grant made the final basket in Boston Garden history in Orlando's series-clinching victory over the Boston Celtics. Grant helped the Magic reach the 1995 NBA Finals, where they were swept in four games by the Houston Rockets. Grant spent the next several seasons with the Magic.

=== Seattle SuperSonics (1999–2000) ===
Grant was traded to the Seattle SuperSonics along with 2000 and 2001 second round picks for Dale Ellis, Don MacLean, Billy Owens, and rookie Corey Maggette just before start of the 1999–2000 season.

=== Los Angeles Lakers (2000–2001) ===
After one year with the Sonics, Grant was involved in a three-way trade in which Glen Rice of the Los Angeles Lakers was sent to New York, Patrick Ewing of the Knicks was sent to Seattle, and Grant to the defending champion Lakers, reuniting him with Shaquille O'Neal and former Bulls coach Phil Jackson. He helped them win another championship in the 2000–01 season.

=== Return to Orlando (2001–2002) ===
In the offseason, Grant decided to leave Los Angeles and sign back with the Orlando Magic. The Los Angeles Lakers would go on to win the 2002 NBA championship without Grant. Grant was ultimately cut by the Magic in December 2002 after then-coach Doc Rivers said Grant had tried to undermine the coach and was a "cancer" on the team.

=== Return to Los Angeles (2003–2004) ===
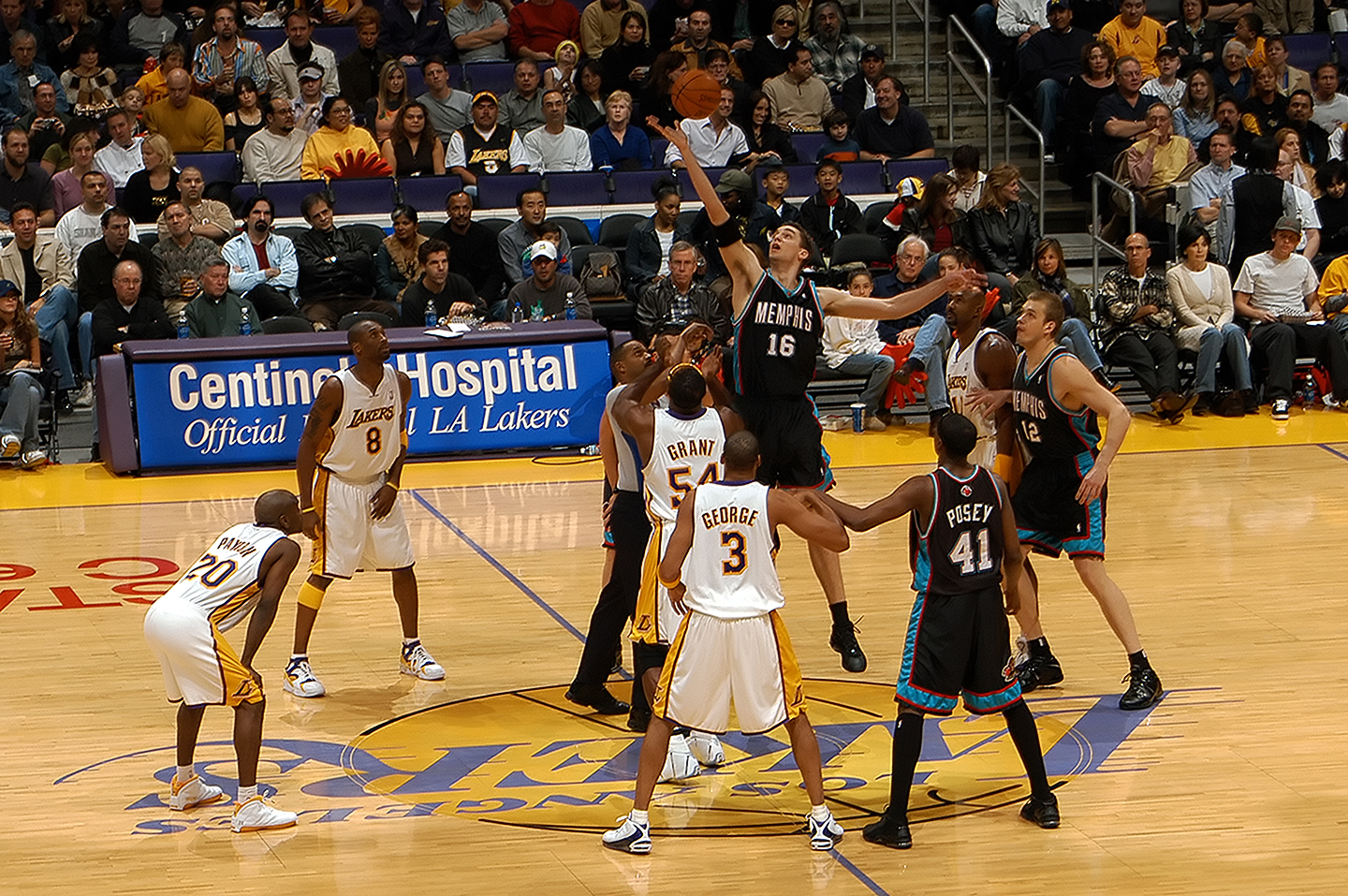
Grant playing for the Lakers in 2003.

Grant chose to retire after getting cut by the Magic. However, he decided to return for another run with the Lakers for the 2003–04 season as a backup to Karl Malone. He then retired permanently following the Lakers' loss to the Detroit Pistons in the 2004 NBA Finals.

== Post-retirement ==
In 2009 Grant was appointed NBA Goodwill Ambassador.

In 2016, he became Special Advisor for Michael Reinsdorf, the president and chief operating officer of the Chicago Bulls.

== Personal life ==
Grant's identical twin brother, Harvey Grant, played 11 NBA seasons for the Washington Bullets/Wizards, Portland Trail Blazers, and Philadelphia 76ers.

Grant was best friends with former teammate Scottie Pippen for many years when they were on the Bulls. He said they grew apart when he left Chicago for Orlando, but that they are still friends and keep in touch.

During his NBA career, Grant was known for and easily recognized by the goggles he wore while playing. He initially wore them for vision correction, as he was legally blind without glasses. He continued wearing goggles on the court after undergoing LASIK surgery, because he had heard from many children who played sports wearing glasses that they looked up to him, and wanted to continue being an inspiration to them.

Three of Grant's nephews are also basketball players. Jerai Grant played college basketball for Clemson University and currently plays overseas; Jerian Grant played for the University of Notre Dame Fighting Irish men's basketball team, he plays in Panathinaikos and was selected as the EuroCup Basketball MVP of the 2022-23 EuroCup Basketball; and Jerami Grant played for the Syracuse University Orange men's basketball team and currently plays for the Portland Trail Blazers.

Horace has three sons (Deon, Horace Jr., and Elijah) and five daughters (Coriel, Gianna, Maia, Naomi, and Eva).

== NBA career statistics ==
Legend
GP	Games played	GS	Games started	MPG	Minutes per game
FG%	Field goal percentage	3P%	3-point field goal percentage	FT%	Free throw percentage
RPG	Rebounds per game	APG	Assists per game	SPG	Steals per game
BPG	Blocks per game	PPG	Points per game	**Bold**	Career high
†	Won an NBA championship	*	Led the league

=== Regular season ===
Year	Team	GP	GS	MPG	FG%	3P%	FT%	RPG	APG	SPG	BPG	PPG
1987–88	Chicago	**81**	6	22.6	.501	.000	.626	5.5	1.1	.6	.7	7.7
1988–89	Chicago	79	79	35.6	.519	.000	.704	8.6	2.1	1.1	.8	12.0
1989–90	Chicago	80	80	34.4	.523	—	.699	7.9	2.8	1.2	1.1	13.4
1990–91†	Chicago	78	76	33.9	.547	.167	.711	8.4	2.3	1.2	.9	12.8
1991–92†	Chicago	**81**	**81**	35.3	**.578**	.000	.741	10.0	2.7	1.2	**1.6**	14.2
1992–93†	Chicago	77	77	35.6	.508	**.200**	.619	9.5	2.6	1.2	1.2	13.2
1993–94	Chicago	70	69	36.7	.524	.000	.596	**11.0**	**3.4**	1.1	1.2	**15.1**
1994–95	Orlando	74	74	36.4	.567	.000	.692	9.7	2.3	1.0	1.2	12.8
1995–96	Orlando	63	62	36.3	.513	.167	.734	9.2	2.7	1.0	1.2	13.4
1996–97	Orlando	67	67	**37.3**	.515	.167	.715	9.0	2.4	**1.5**	1.0	12.6
1997–98	Orlando	76	76	36.9	.459	.000	.678	8.1	2.3	1.1	1.0	12.1
1998–99	Orlando	50*	50*	33.2	.434	.000	.671	7.0	1.8	.9	1.2	8.9
1999–00	Seattle	76	76	35.4	.444	.000	.721	7.8	2.5	.7	.8	8.1
2000–01†	L.A. Lakers	77	77	31.0	.462	.000	**.775**	7.1	1.6	.7	.8	8.5
2001–02	Orlando	76	76	29.1	.513	—	.721	6.3	1.4	.8	.6	8.0
2002–03	Orlando	5	1	17.0	.520	—	—	1.6	1.4	.6	.0	5.2
2003–04	L. A. Lakers	55	10	20.1	.411	.000	.722	4.2	1.3	.4	.4	4.1
Career		1,165	1,037	33.2	.509	.063	.692	8.1	2.2	1.0	1.0	11.2
All-Star		1	0	17.0	.250	—	—	8.0	2.0	1.0	2.0	4.0

=== Playoffs ===
Year	Team	GP	GS	MPG	FG%	3P%	FT%	RPG	APG	SPG	BPG	PPG
1988	Chicago	10	0	29.9	.568	.000	.600	7.0	1.6	1.4	.2	10.1
1989	Chicago	17	17	36.8	.518	—	.800	9.8	2.1	.6	.9	10.8
1990	Chicago	16	16	38.5	.509	.000	.623	9.9	2.5	1.1	1.1	12.2
1991†	Chicago	17	17	39.2	.583	—	.733	8.1	2.2	.9	.4	13.3
1992†	Chicago	**22**	**22**	38.9	.541	.000	.671	8.8	**3.0**	1.1	**1.8**	11.3
1993†	Chicago	19	19	34.3	.546	—	.685	8.2	2.3	1.2	1.2	10.7
1994	Chicago	10	10	39.3	.542	**1.000**	.738	7.4	2.6	1.0	**1.8**	**16.2**
1995	Orlando	21	21	**41.4**	.540	.000	.763	**10.4**	1.9	1.0	1.1	13.7
1996	Orlando	9	9	37.1	**.649**	—	.867	**10.4**	1.4	.8	.7	15.0
1999	Orlando	4	4	32.0	.367	—	.625	7.0	1.3	.5	.5	6.8
2000	Seattle	5	5	37.0	.407	—	.500	6.2	2.0	**1.6**	1.0	4.8
2001†	L.A. Lakers	16	16	26.4	.385	—	.733	6.0	1.2	.9	.8	6.0
2002	Orlando	4	4	31.8	.364	—	**1.000**	7.8	2.3	.8	.3	4.5
Career		170	160	36.3	.530	.125	.714	8.6	2.1	1.0	1.0	11.2

== See also ==
- List of NBA career minutes played leaders
- List of NBA career playoff rebounding leaders
