= Celtics–Pistons rivalry =

National Basketball Association rivalry

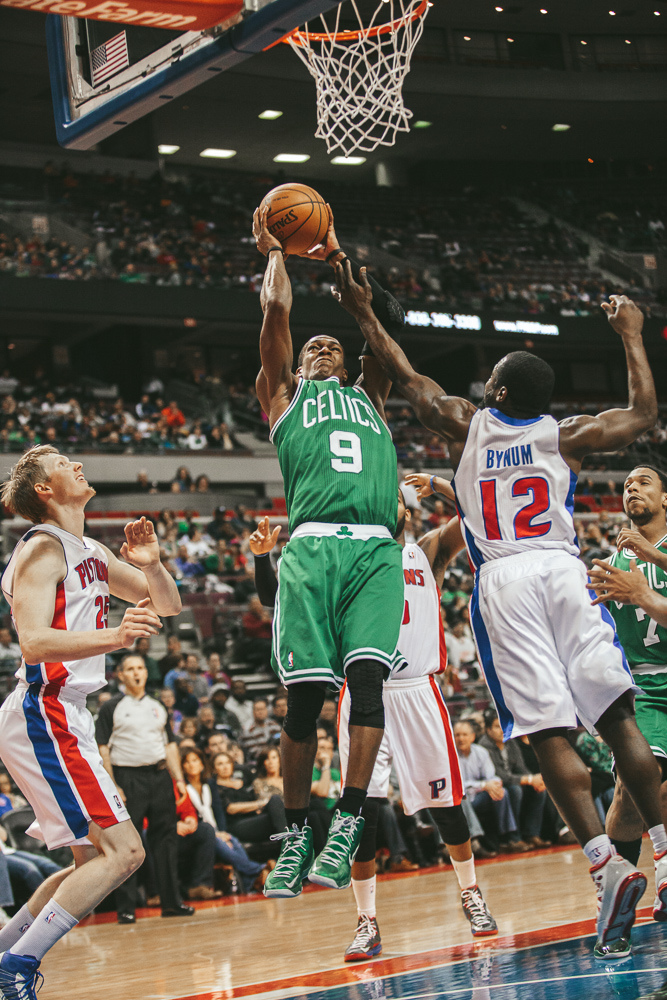
- Celtics' Rajon Rondo attempting a shot over Pistons' Will Bynum in a regular season game in 2013

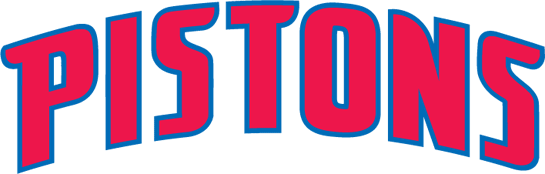
- Boston Celtics Detroit Pistons
- First meeting: November 12, 1948; Celtics 84, Pistons 75
- Latest meeting: October 20, 2026; Celtics 113, Pistons 121
- Next meeting: December 20, 2026

Statistics
- Total meetings: 446
- All-time series: 281–166 (BOS)
- Regular season series: 257–145 (BOS)
- Postseason results: 24–21 (BOS)
- Longest win streak: BOS W17
- Current win streak: DET W3

Postseason history
- 1968 Eastern Division Semifinals: Celtics won, 4–2; 1985 Eastern Conference Semifinals: Celtics won, 4-2; 1987 Eastern Conference Finals: Celtics won, 4–3; 1988 Eastern Conference Finals: Pistons won, 4–2; 1989 Eastern Conference First Round: Pistons won, 3–0; 1991 Eastern Conference Semifinals: Pistons won, 4–2; 2002 Eastern Conference Semifinals: Celtics won, 4–1; 2008 Eastern Conference Finals: Celtics won, 4–2

The Celtics–Pistons rivalry is a National Basketball Association (NBA) rivalry between the Boston Celtics and the Detroit Pistons. The two teams played each other in the NBA playoffs five times from 1985 to 1991, with Boston winning in 1985 and 1987, and Detroit winning en route to three consecutive NBA Finals appearances from 1988 to 1990. The rivalry peaked in the late 1980s, featuring players such as Larry Bird, Kevin McHale, Robert Parish, Dennis Rodman, Isiah Thomas, Joe Dumars, and Bill Laimbeer.

== History ==
=== Pre-1980s ===
Between 1948 and 1978, the Celtics and Pistons were on opposite divisions/conferences in all but three seasons. The Pistons found success in the early 1950s behind George Yardley, making two NBA Finals appearances, while the Celtics soon built a dynasty behind Bill Russell, winning 11 championships between 1957 and 1969.

The Pistons and Celtics first opposed each other in postseason play in 1968, with the Celtics emerging victorious in six games of the Eastern Division Semifinals. However, the Pistons were generally mediocre for a majority of the 1960s and 1970s, despite the presence of stars such as Dave DeBusschere, Dave Bing and Bob Lanier. Meanwhile, the Celtics continued to rack up championships with Russell, John Havlicek and Dave Cowens leading the way.

=== Bird and Isiah ===
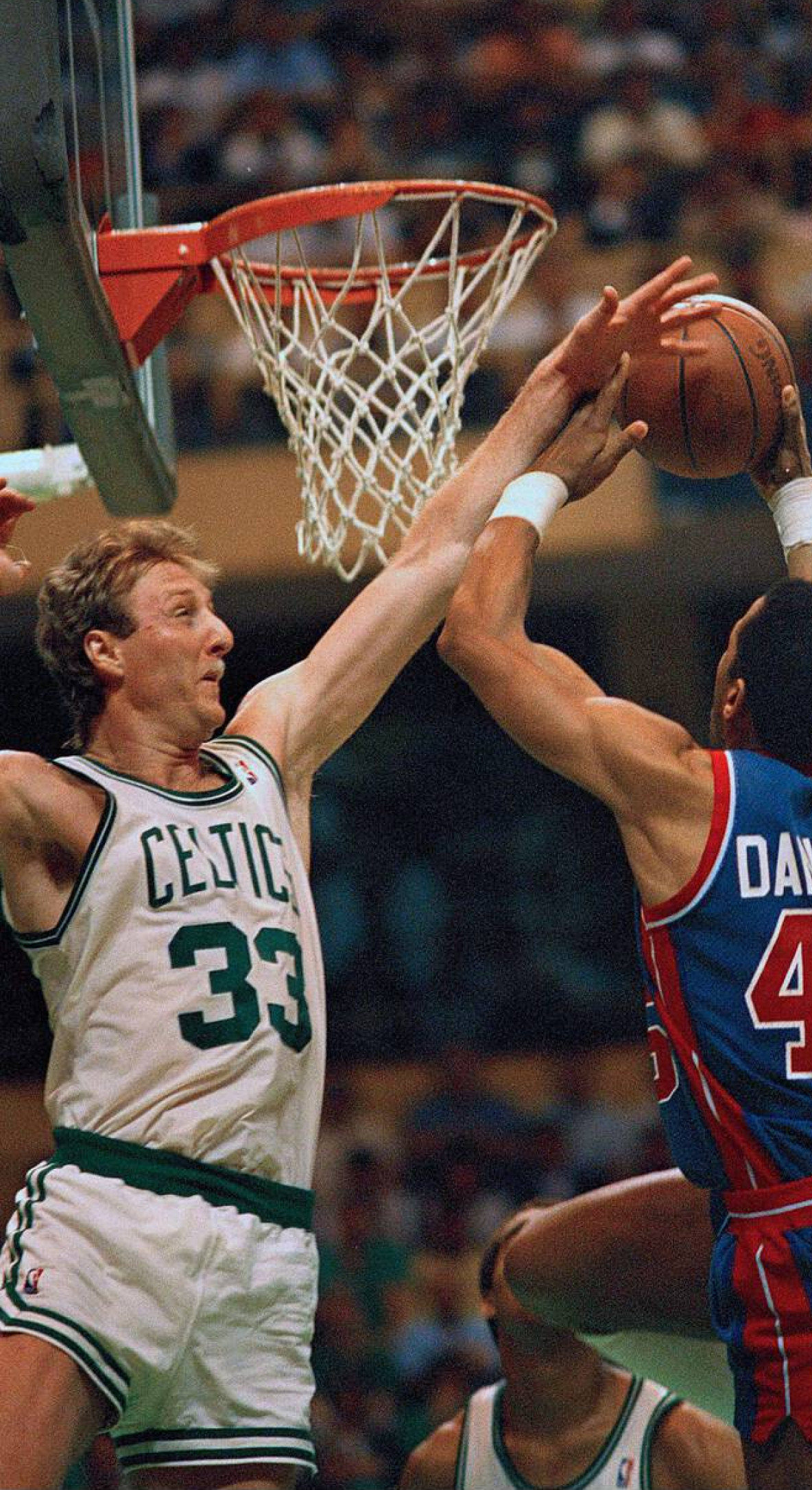
Pistons' Adrian Dantley attempting a shot over Celtics' Larry Bird during the 1987 Eastern Conference Finals

In the 1978 NBA draft, the Celtics drafted Larry Bird who would soon resurrect the franchise's fortunes. Then in the 1981 NBA draft, the Pistons picked Isiah Thomas and along with head coach Chuck Daly he would also play a key role in his team's reemergence.

It was also in 1978 that the Pistons moved to the Eastern Conference, turning their matchups against the Celtics into an intra-conference affair. The Celtics would win three NBA championships in the 1980s, while the Pistons gradually built a team that eventually became the Bad Boys.

The two teams met in the 1985 Eastern Conference Semifinals, where the Celtics ousted the younger Pistons in six games. But when they reengaged in the 1987 Eastern Conference Finals, the Pistons were a vastly different team. The Bad Boys, as Detroit became known, used physical play to intimidate their way to victory. This roused the ire of Boston's players and fans, and the teams' mutual hatred of each other often led to on-court fighting. Detroit's biggest antagonists were Bill Laimbeer, Rick Mahorn and Dennis Rodman. In Game 3, Bird and Laimbeer were ejected for fighting as the Pistons won 122–104.

The most famous moment of the rivalry occurred during Game 5. Leading 107–106 with 5 seconds left, and Detroit threatening to take a 3–2 series lead, Isiah Thomas had his inbounds pass stolen by Bird, who dished it off to Dennis Johnson for the winning layup. With Parish forced to sit out Game 6 due to a suspension for punching Laimbeer in the second quarter of Game 5 (the first for a playoff game in NBA history; he also re-sprained his right ankle late in Game 5), the Pistons won Game 6 113–105 to send it back to Boston for Game 7. The Celtics ended the bitter series with a 117–114 win in Boston Garden over Detroit.

The Celtics and Pistons faced off anew in the 1988 Eastern Conference Finals. This time the Pistons finally unseated the Celtics, winning the series 4–2 and advancing to the NBA Finals to face the Lakers. What was notable was that Detroit, who entered the series with 21 straight losses at the Boston Garden, beat Boston by winning 2 of 3 there (Games 1 and 5). In Game 5, the Celtics led by 16 before the Pistons rallied to win 102–96 in OT. In addition, their rough play and intense defense made Bird's scoring drop to just 10 points per game on 35.1% shooting, forcing Boston to rely on McHale.

The teams met twice more in the Bird/Thomas era. In the 1989 First Round, Detroit swept Boston 3–0 en route to their first championship, as the Celtics missed the services of Bird due to injury. Then in the 1991 Eastern Conference Semifinals, the Pistons eliminated the Celtics in six games, but it proved to be the last hurrah for the two aging squads.

=== Later years ===
Both teams entered a period of rebuilding during the 1990s. Although the Pistons found a new star in Grant Hill, he was unable to lead the team back to championship contention. Meanwhile, the Celtics endured a long dry spell, not reaching the playoffs for much of the decade.

The 2000s saw both teams reemerge as contenders. In 2002, the Celtics and Pistons met again in the Eastern Conference Semifinals. Boston was led by Paul Pierce and Antoine Walker, while Detroit was led by Jerry Stackhouse and Ben Wallace. Though Detroit had a better regular season record, the Celtics surprisingly eliminated them in five games, reaching their first Conference Finals since 1988. However, the Pistons would go on to dominate the Eastern Conference, reaching six consecutive Conference Finals, two NBA Finals and winning the 2004 championship. One of the Pistons' key players during that era was Chauncey Billups, who the Celtics drafted third overall in the 1997 NBA draft but would later emerge as a star in Detroit. Meanwhile, the Celtics slid back to mediocrity, but was given a new lease in life during the 2007 offseason.

After acquiring Kevin Garnett and Ray Allen, the Celtics and Pistons renewed the rivalry as they met in the 2008 Eastern Conference Finals. However, the grind of reaching six straight conference finals took its toll on Detroit as Boston toppled their rivals in six games, eventually winning the championship that year.

The 2010s saw both teams head into opposite directions. Detroit endured a lengthy rebuild with only two playoff appearances, while Boston missed the playoffs once and maintained its status as a playoff contender behind new stars such as Jayson Tatum, Jaylen Brown, Gordon Hayward, Kyrie Irving and Kemba Walker. During the 2023–24 season, the Celtics staged a remarkable 21-point comeback against the Pistons, securing an overtime win to extend Detroit's losing streak to 28, which is the longest single-season losing streak and tied for the longest losing streak overall in NBA history.

The Celtics and Pistons faced off during 2025 NBA Cup under East Group B, with the Celtics winning the group stage game on November 26 with a score of 117–114. The loss snapped the Pistons' 13-game winning streak, which tied their franchise record. With both teams eventually finishing the group stage with a 2–2 record, this game secured the head-to-head tiebreaker for the Celtics to place higher than the Pistons in such group, which was won by the Orlando Magic. They also finished that same season as the top two teams in the Eastern Conference; however, neither reached the conference finals.

== Season-by-season results ==
Boston Celtics vs. Fort Wayne Pistons/Detroit Pistons Season-by-Season Results
1940s (Celtics, 6–5)

| Season | Season series | | at Boston Celtics | at Fort Wayne Pistons | at Neutral Site | Overall series | Notes |
|---|---|---|---|---|---|---|---|
| 1948–49 | Celtics | 4–1 | Celtics, 2–0 | Tie, 1–1 | Celtics, 1–0 | Celtics, 4–1 | Neutral site game was played at Chicago Stadium, Chicago, Illinois. Pistons join the Basketball Association of America (BAA) from the National Basketball League (NBL) and are placed in the Western Division. |
| 1949–50 | Pistons | 4–2 | Celtics, 2–1 | Pistons, 3–0 | | Celtics, 6–5 | Basketball Association of America and National Basketball League merge to become the National Basketball Association (NBA). Pistons briefly join the Central Division. |

1950s (Celtics, 55–25)

| Season | Season series | | at Boston Celtics | at Fort Wayne Pistons/Detroit Pistons | at Neutral Site | Overall series | Notes |
|---|---|---|---|---|---|---|---|
| 1950–51 | Celtics | 5–1 | Celtics, 3–0 | Celtics, 2–1 | | Celtics, 11–6 | Pistons move back to the Western Division. Bob Cousy makes his debut for the Celtics. |
| 1951–52 | Tie | 3–3 | Celtics, 2–1 | Pistons, 2–1 | | Celtics, 14–9 | |
| 1952–53 | Celtics | 4–2 | Celtics, 2–0 | Pistons, 2–1 | Celtics, 1–0 | Celtics, 18–11 | Neutral site game was played at Madison Square Garden (III), New York, New York. |
| 1953–54 | Tie | 4–4 | Celtics, 3–0 | Pistons, 4–0 | Celtics, 1–0 | Celtics, 22–15 | Neutral site game was played at Madison Square Garden (III). |
| 1954–55 | Pistons | 5–4 | Celtics, 3–0 | Pistons, 3–1 | Pistons, 2–0 | Celtics, 26–20 | Neutral site games were played at: Curry Hicks Cage, Amherst, Massachusetts; Madison Square Garden (III); Pistons finish with the best record in the league (tied with the Syracuse Nationals) (43–29). Pistons lose 1955 NBA Finals. |
| 1955–56 | Pistons | 5–4 | Celtics, 2–1 | Pistons, 2–0 | Tie, 2–2 | Celtics, 30–25 | Last season Celtics played at Boston Arena as secondary home arena. Neutral site games were played at: Charlotte Coliseum, Charlotte, North Carolina; Miami Beach Auditorium, Miami Beach, Florida; Philadelphia Arena, Philadelphia, Pennsylvania; Madison Square Garden (III); Pistons lose 1956 NBA Finals. |
| 1956–57 | Celtics | 6–3 | Celtics, 3–0 | Pistons, 3–1 | Celtics, 2–0 | Celtics, 36–28 | Neutral site games were played at: Madison Square Garden (III); Philadelphia Convention Hall, Philadelphia, Pennsylvania; Last season Pistons played as a Fort Wayne-based team. Bill Russell makes his debut for the Celtics. Celtics finish with the best record in the league (44–28). Celtics win 1957 NBA Finals. |
| 1957–58 | Celtics | 8–1 | Pistons, 3–1 | Celtics, 4–0 | Celtics, 1–0 | Celtics, 44–29 | Neutral site game was played at Kiel Auditorium, St. Louis, Missouri. Celtics finish with the best record in the league (49–23). Celtics lose 1958 NBA Finals. |
| 1958–59 | Celtics | 8–1 | Celtics, 4–0 | Celtics, 3–1 | Celtics, 1–0 | Celtics, 52–30 | Neutral site game was played at Kiel Auditorium. Celtics finish with the best record in the league (52–20). Celtics win 1959 NBA Finals. |
| 1959–60 | Celtics | 9–0 | Celtics, 2–0 | Celtics, 4–0 | Celtics, 3–0 | Celtics, 61–30 | Neutral site games were played at: Kiel Auditorium; Rhode Island Auditorium, Providence, Rhode Island, Rhode Island; Rhode Island Auditorium; Celtics sweep Pistons for the first time. Celtics finish with the best record in the league (59–16). Celtics win 1960 NBA Finals. |

1960s (Celtics, 69–21)

| Season | Season series | | at Boston Celtics | at Detroit Pistons | at Neutral site | Overall series | Notes |
|---|---|---|---|---|---|---|---|
| 1960–61 | Celtics | 8–2 | Celtics, 3–0 | Celtics, 3–1 | Celtics, 2–1 | Celtics, 69–32 | Neutral site games were played at: Madison Square Garden (III); Kiel Auditorium; Onondaga War Memorial, Syracuse, New York; Celtics win 17 in a row against the Pistons (1958-1960). Celtics finish with the best record in the league (57–22). Celtics win 1961 NBA Finals. |
| 1961–62 | Celtics | 5–3 | Tie, 1–1 | Celtics, 3–1 | Tie, 1–1 | Celtics, 74–35 | Neutral site games were played at: Convention Hall, Philadelphia; Madison Square Garden (III); Celtics finish with the best record in the league (60–20). Celtics win 1962 NBA Finals. |
| 1962–63 | Celtics | 8–0 | Celtics, 2–0 | Celtics, 4–0 | Celtics, 2–0 | Celtics, 82–35 | Neutral site games were played at: Madison Square Garden (III); Rhode Island Auditorium; John Havlicek makes his debut for the Celtics. Final season for Bob Cousy as a Celtics player. Celtics finish with the best record in the league (58–22). Celtics win 1963 NBA Finals. |
| 1963–64 | Celtics | 7–1 | Celtics, 2–0 | Celtics, 3–1 | Celtics, 2–0 | Celtics, 89–36 | Neutral site games were played at: Madison Square Garden (III); Rhode Island Auditorium; Celtics finish with the best record in the league (59–21). Celtics win 1964 NBA Finals. |
| 1964–65 | Celtics | 10–0 | Celtics, 2–0 | Celtics, 4–0 | Celtics, 4–0 | Celtics, 99–36 | Neutral site games were played at: Convention Hall, Philadelphia; Madison Square Garden (III); War Memorial Coliseum, Fort Wayne, Indiana; Rhode Island Auditorium; Celtics finish with the best record in the league (62–18). Celtics win 1965 NBA Finals. |
| 1965–66 | Celtics | 6–4 | Tie, 1–1 | Tie, 2–2 | Celtics, 3–1 | Celtics, 105–40 | Neutral site games were played at: Rhode Island Auditorium; Convention Hall, Philadelphia; War Memorial Coliseum; Madison Square Garden (III); Celtics record their 100th win over the Pistons. Celtics win 1966 NBA Finals. |
| 1966–67 | Celtics | 6–3 | Tie, 1–1 | Celtics, 2–1 | Celtics, 3–1 | Celtics, 111–43 | Neutral site games were played at: Convention Hall, Philadelphia; Madison Square Garden (III); Convention Hall, Minneapolis, Minnesota; Rhode Island Auditorium; Bill Russell becomes the player-coach for the Celtics. |
| 1967–68 | Celtics | 6–2 | Celtics, 3–1 | Celtics, 2–1 | Celtics, 1–0 | Celtics, 117–45 | Pistons move to the Eastern Division, resulting in the rivalry becoming an inter-divisional one. |
| 1968 Eastern Division Semifinals | Celtics | 4–2 | Celtics, 2–1 | Celtics, 2–1 | | Celtics, 121–47 | 1st NBA playoff meeting. Celtics go on to win 1968 NBA Finals. |
| 1968–69 | Celtics | 5–1 | Celtics, 2–1 | Celtics, 3–0 | | Celtics, 126–48 | Celtics win 1969 NBA Finals. Final season for Bill Russell. |
| 1969–70 | Celtics | 4–3 | Celtics, 2–1 | Pistons, 2–1 | Celtics, 1–0 | Celtics, 130–51 | Neutral site game was played at Cleveland Arena, Cleveland, Ohio. Pistons finish with a winning record at home for the first time since 1956-57. |

1970s (Celtics, 31–13)

| Season | Season series | | at Boston Celtics | at Detroit Pistons | at Neutral Site | Overall series | Notes |
|---|---|---|---|---|---|---|---|
| 1970–71 | Pistons | 3–2 | Pistons, 2–0 | Celtics, 2–1 | | Celtics, 132–54 | Celtics are placed in the Eastern Conference and the Atlantic Division. Pistons are placed in the Western Conference and the Midwest Division. Pistons finish with a winning record in Boston for the first time, and win the season series for the first time since 1955-56 |
| 1971–72 | Celtics | 5–0 | Celtics, 3–0 | Celtics, 2–0 | | Celtics, 137–54 | |
| 1972–73 | Celtics | 3–1 | Tie, 1–1 | Celtics, 2–0 | | Celtics, 140–55 | Celtics finish with the best record in the league (68–14). |
| 1973–74 | Celtics | 3–1 | Celtics, 1–0 | Tie, 1–1 | Celtics, 1–0 | Celtics, 143–56 | Neutral site game was played at Providence Civic Center, Providence, Rhode Island. Last season the rivalry is played at a neutral site. Celtics win 1974 NBA Finals. |
| 1974–75 | Celtics | 3–1 | Tie, 1–1 | Celtics, 2–0 | | Celtics, 146–57 | Celtics finish with the best record in the league (60–22). |
| 1975–76 | Celtics | 4–0 | Celtics, 2–0 | Celtics, 2–0 | | Celtics, 150–57 | Celtics win the 1976 NBA Finals. |
| 1976–77 | Tie | 2–2 | Tie, 1–1 | Tie, 1–1 | | Celtics, 152–59 | |
| 1977–78 | Pistons | 3–1 | Tie, 1–1 | Pistons, 2–0 | | Celtics, 153–62 | Final season for John Havlicek. |
| 1978–79 | Tie | 2–2 | Tie, 1–1 | Tie, 1–1 | | Celtics, 155–64 | Pistons move from the Midwest Division in the Western Conference to the Central Division in the Eastern Conference resulting in the rivalry being interdivisional. |
| 1979–80 | Celtics | 6–0 | Celtics, 3–0 | Celtics, 3–0 | | Celtics, 161–64 | Larry Bird makes his debut for the Celtics. Celtics finish with the best record in the league (61–21). |

1980s (Celtics, 44–31)

| Season | Season series | | at Boston Celtics | at Detroit Pistons | Overall series | Notes |
|---|---|---|---|---|---|---|
| 1980–81 | Celtics | 4–1 | Tie, 1–1 | Celtics, 3–0 | Celtics, 165–65 | Celtics finish with the best record in the league (62–20). Celtics win 1981 NBA Finals. |
| 1981–82 | Celtics | 6–0 | Celtics, 3–0 | Celtics, 3–0 | Celtics, 171–65 | Isiah Thomas makes his debut for the Pistons. Celtics finish with the best record in the league (63–19). |
| 1982–83 | Tie | 3–3 | Pistons, 2–1 | Celtics, 2–1 | Celtics, 174–68 | |
| 1983–84 | Celtics | 4–2 | Celtics, 3–0 | Pistons, 2–1 | Celtics, 178–70 | Celtics finish with the best record in the league (62–20). Celtics win 1984 NBA Finals. |
| 1984–85 | Celtics | 4–2 | Celtics, 3–0 | Pistons, 2–1 | Celtics, 182–72 | Celtics finish with the best record in the league (63–19). |
| 1985 Eastern Conference Semifinals | Celtics | 4–2 | Celtics, 3–0 | Pistons, 2–1 | Celtics, 186–74 | 2nd NBA playoff meeting. Celtics would go on to lose 1985 NBA Finals. |
| 1985–86 | Celtics | 4–1 | Celtics, 3–0 | Tie, 1–1 | Celtics, 190–75 | Celtics finish with the best record in the league (67–15). Celtics win 1986 NBA Finals. |
| 1986–87 | Celtics | 3–2 | Celtics, 2–0 | Pistons, 2–1 | Celtics, 193–77 | |
| 1987 Eastern Conference Finals | Celtics | 4–3 | Celtics, 4–0 | Pistons, 3–0 | Celtics, 197–80 | 3rd NBA playoff meeting. Celtics would go on to lose 1987 NBA Finals. |
| 1987–88 | Tie | 3–3 | Celtics, 3–0 | Pistons, 3–0 | Celtics, 200–83 | Celtics record their 200th win over the Pistons. Last season Pistons play in the Pontiac Silverdome. |
| 1988 Eastern Conference Finals | Pistons | 4–2 | Pistons, 2–1 | Pistons, 2–1 | Celtics, 202–87 | 4th NBA playoff meeting. Pistons would go on to lose 1988 NBA Finals. |
| 1988–89 | Pistons | 3–1 | Tie, 1–1 | Pistons, 2–0 | Celtics, 203–90 | Pistons open up The Palace of Auburn Hills. Pistons finish with the best record in the league (63–19). |
| 1989 Eastern Conference First Round | Pistons | 3–0 | Pistons, 1–0 | Pistons, 2–0 | Celtics, 203–93 | 5th NBA playoff meeting. First and only sweep in the rivalry. Pistons would go on to win 1989 NBA Finals. |
| 1989–90 | Tie | 2–2 | Celtics, 2–0 | Pistons, 2–0 | Celtics, 205–95 | Pistons win 1990 NBA Finals. |

1990s (Pistons, 24–19)

| Season | Season series | | at Boston Celtics | at Detroit Pistons | Overall series | Notes |
|---|---|---|---|---|---|---|
| 1990–91 | Tie | 2–2 | Celtics, 2–0 | Pistons, 2–0 | Celtics, 207–97 | |
| 1991 Eastern Conference Semifinals | Pistons | 4–2 | Pistons, 2–1 | Pistons, 2–1 | Celtics, 209–101 | 6th NBA playoff meeting. Pistons record their 100th win over the Celtics. |
| 1991–92 | Celtics | 4–0 | Celtics, 2–0 | Celtics, 2–0 | Celtics, 213–101 | Final season for Larry Bird. |
| 1992–93 | Pistons | 3–1 | Tie, 1–1 | Pistons, 2–0 | Celtics, 214–104 | |
| 1993–94 | Celtics | 3–1 | Tie, 1–1 | Celtics, 2–0 | Celtics, 217–105 | Final season for Isiah Thomas. |
| 1994–95 | Celtics | 3–1 | Celtics, 2–0 | Tie, 1–1 | Celtics, 220–106 | Final season Celtics played at Boston Garden. |
| 1995–96 | Celtics | 2–1 | Celtics, 2–0 | Pistons, 1–0 | Celtics, 222–107 | Celtics open up Fleet Center (now known as TD Garden). |
| 1996–97 | Pistons | 4–0 | Pistons, 2–0 | Pistons, 2–0 | Celtics, 222–111 | Pistons record their first regular season sweep of the Celtics. |
| 1997–98 | Tie | 1–1 | Tie, 1–1 | Tie, 1–1 | Celtics, 224–113 | Paul Pierce makes his debut for the Celtics. |
| 1998–99 | Pistons | 3–0 | Pistons, 2–0 | Pistons, 1–0 | Celtics, 224–116 | |
| 1999–2000 | Pistons | 3–0 | Pistons, 1–0 | Pistons, 2–0 | Celtics, 224–119 | |

2000s (Pistons, 24–23)

| Season | Season series | | at Boston Celtics | at Detroit Pistons | Overall series | Notes |
|---|---|---|---|---|---|---|
| 2000–01 | Celtics | 3–1 | Celtics, 2–0 | Tie, 1–1 | Celtics, 227–120 | |
| 2001–02 | Tie | 2–2 | Celtics, 2–0 | Pistons, 2–0 | Celtics, 229–122 | |
| 2002 Eastern Conference Semifinals | Celtics | 4–1 | Celtics, 2–0 | Celtics, 2–1 | Celtics, 233–123 | 7th NBA playoff meeting. |
| 2002–03 | Tie | 2–2 | Tie, 1–1 | Tie, 1–1 | Celtics, 235–125 | |
| 2003–04 | Pistons | 3–0 | Pistons, 2–0 | Pistons, 1–0 | Celtics, 235–128 | Pistons win 2004 NBA Finals. |
| 2004–05 | Pistons | 3–1 | Tie, 1–1 | Pistons, 2–0 | Celtics, 236–131 | Pistons lose 2005 NBA Finals. |
| 2005–06 | Pistons | 3–0 | Pistons, 1–0 | Pistons, 2–0 | Celtics, 236–134 | Pistons finish with the best record in the league (64–18). |
| 2006–07 | Pistons | 4–0 | Pistons, 2–0 | Pistons, 2–0 | Celtics, 236–138 | |
| 2007–08 | Celtics | 2–1 | Tie, 1–1 | Celtics, 1–0 | Celtics, 238–139 | Pistons win 9 in a row against the Celtics (2005-2008). Celtics finish with the best record in the league (66–16). |
| 2008 Eastern Conference Finals | Celtics | 4–2 | Celtics, 2–1 | Celtics, 2–1 | Celtics, 242–141 | 8th NBA playoff meeting. Celtics would go on to win 2008 NBA Finals. |
| 2008–09 | Celtics | 3–1 | Tie, 1–1 | Celtics, 2–0 | Celtics, 245–142 | |
| 2009–10 | Celtics | 2–1 | Celtics, 1–0 | Tie, 1–1 | Celtics, 247–143 | Celtics lose 2010 NBA Finals. |

2010s (Celtics, 19–15)

| Season | Season series | | at Boston Celtics | at Detroit Pistons | Overall series | Notes |
|---|---|---|---|---|---|---|
| 2010–11 | Celtics | 3–1 | Celtics, 2–0 | Tie, 1–1 | Celtics, 250–144 | |
| 2011–12 | Pistons | 2–1 | Tie, 1–1 | Pistons, 1–0 | Celtics, 251–146 | |
| 2012–13 | Pistons | 2–1 | Celtics, 1–0 | Pistons, 2–0 | Celtics, 252–148 | |
| 2013–14 | Pistons | 3–1 | Tie, 1–1 | Pistons, 2–0 | Celtics, 253–151 | |
| 2014–15 | Celtics | 2–1 | Tie, 1–1 | Celtics, 1–0 | Celtics, 255–152 | |
| 2015–16 | Tie | 2–2 | Tie, 1–1 | Tie, 1–1 | Celtics, 257–154 | |
| 2016–17 | Celtics | 3–1 | Tie, 1–1 | Celtics, 2–0 | Celtics, 260–155 | Last season Pistons played at The Palace of Auburn Hills. Jaylen Brown makes his debut for the Celtics. |
| 2017–18 | Celtics | 2–1 | Pistons, 1–0 | Celtics, 2–0 | Celtics, 262–156 | Pistons open up Little Caesars Arena. Jayson Tatum makes his debut for the Celtics. |
| 2018–19 | Celtics | 3–1 | Celtics, 2–0 | Tie, 1–1 | Celtics, 265–157 | |
| 2019–20 | Tie | 1–1 | Tie, 1–1 | N/A | Celtics, 266–158 | Due to the COVID-19 pandemic suspending the season, the game scheduled in Detroit was canceled. |

2020s (Celtics, 15–8)

| Season | Season series | | at Boston Celtics | at Detroit Pistons | Overall series | Notes |
|---|---|---|---|---|---|---|
| 2020–21 | Pistons | 2–1 | Pistons, 1–0 | Tie, 1–1 | Celtics, 267–160 | |
| 2021–22 | Celtics | 3–1 | Tie, 1–1 | Celtics, 2–0 | Celtics, 270–161 | Celtics lose 2022 NBA Finals. |
| 2022–23 | Celtics | 4–0 | Celtics, 2–0 | Celtics, 2–0 | Celtics, 274–161 | |
| 2023–24 | Celtics | 3–0 | Celtics, 2–0 | Celtics, 1–0 | Celtics, 277–161 | Celtics win their first Maurice Podoloff Trophy (64–18). Celtics win 2024 NBA Finals. |
| 2024–25 | Celtics | 3–1 | Celtics, 2–0 | Tie, 1–1 | Celtics, 280–162 | |
| 2025–26 | Pistons | 3–1 | Tie, 1–1 | Pistons, 2–0 | Celtics, 281–165 | On November 26, 2025, at Boston, the Celtics beat the Pistons 117–114 during the 2025 NBA Cup group stage. This game secured the tiebreaker for the Celtics to place higher in East Group B. Final season for Jaylen Brown as a Celtic. |
| 2026–27 | Pistons | 1–0 | December 20th, 2026 | Pistons, 1–0 | Celtics, 281–166 | First game in Detroit was the first game of the season. Pistons overcome a 72-50 deficit in the third quarter to win 121-113. |

Summary of Results

| Season | Season series | | at Boston Celtics | at Fort Wayne Pistons/Detroit Pistons | at Neutral Site | Notes |
|---|---|---|---|---|---|---|
| Regular season games | Celtics | 257–145 | Celtics, 125–48 | Celtics, 100–89 | Celtics, 32–8 | |
| Postseason games | Celtics | 24–21 | Celtics, 15–7 | Pistons, 14–9 | | |
| Postseason series | Celtics | 5–3 | Tie, 1–1 | Celtics, 4–2 | | Eastern Conference Finals: 1987, 1988, 2008; Eastern Division Semifinals: 1968; Eastern Conference Semifinals: 1985, 1991, 2002; Eastern Conference First Round: 1989 |
| Regular and postseason | Celtics | 281–166 | Celtics, 140–55 | Celtics, 109–103 | Celtics, 32–8 | There were 40 total Neutral site games played. |

== Individual Records ==
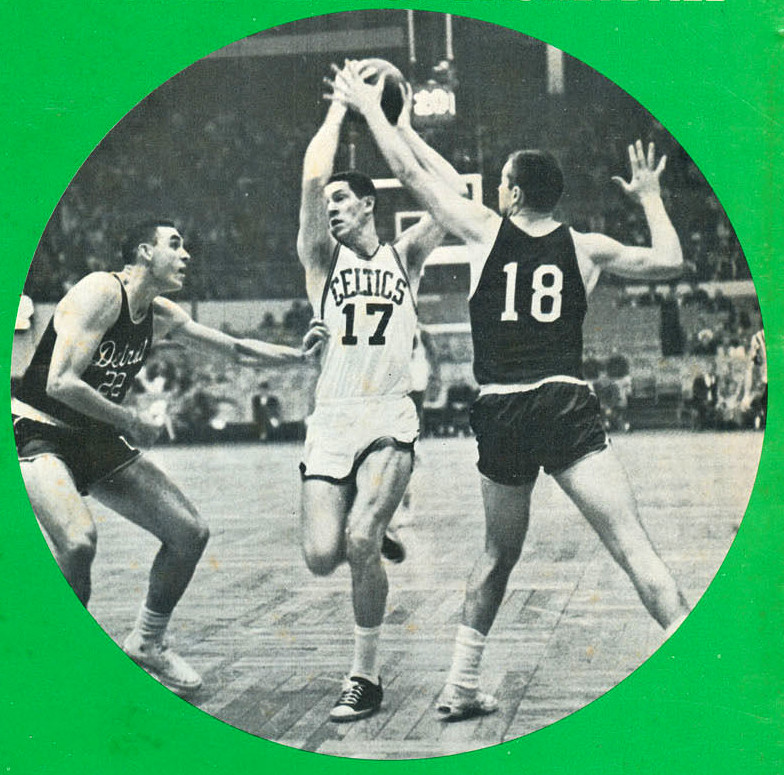
John Havlicek (center) has scored the most points in this rivalry.

=== Top Scorers (Regular Season) ===
| Rank | Player | Team | Points | GP | PPG |
|---|---|---|---|---|---|
| 1 | John Havlicek | Celtics | 1,982 | 93 | 21.3 |
| 2 | Bob Cousy | Celtics | 1,866 | 102 | 18.3 |
| 3 | Sam Jones | Celtics | 1,599 | 93 | 17.2 |
| 4 | Bill Russell | Celtics | 1,568 | 95 | 14.9 |
| 5 | Tom Heinsohn | Celtics | 1,434 | 75 | 19.1 |
| 6 | Bill Sharman | Celtics | 1,420 | 77 | 18.4 |
| 7 | Larry Bird | Celtics | 1,331 | 53 | 25.1 |
| 8 | Isiah Thomas | Pistons | 1,325 | 59 | 22.5 |
| 9 | Kevin McHale | Celtics | 1,318 | 63 | 20.9 |
| 10 | Dave Bing | Pistons | 1,146 | 50 | 22.9 |

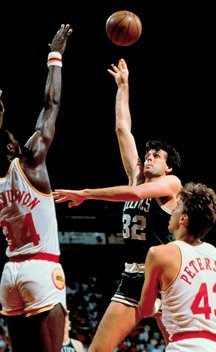
Kevin McHale scored the most points in the playoffs in this rivalry. He's also tied for the most playoff games played.

=== Per Game (Regular Season, min. 20 GP) ===
1. Larry Bird (BOS) – 25.1 (53 GP)
2. Jayson Tatum (BOS) – 24.3 (20 GP)
3. Bob Lanier (DET) – 23.8 (35 GP)
4. Dave Bing (DET) – 22.9 (50 GP)
5. Isiah Thomas (DET) – 22.5 (59 GP)

=== Top Scorers (NBA Playoffs) ===
| Rank | Player | Team | Points | GP | PPG |
|---|---|---|---|---|---|
| 1 | Kevin McHale | Celtics | 603 | 28 | 21.5 |
| 2 | Larry Bird | Celtics | 545 | 24 | 22.7 |
| 3 | Isiah Thomas | Pistons | 523 | 26 | 20.1 |
| 4 | Vinnie Johnson | Pistons | 413 | 28 | 14.8 |
| 5 | Robert Parish | Celtics | 390 | 26 | 15.0 |
| 6 | Bill Laimbeer | Pistons | 356 | 28 | 12.7 |
| 7 | Dennis Johnson | Celtics | 305 | 22 | 13.9 |
| 8 | Adrian Dantley | Pistons | 267 | 13 | 20.5 |
| 9 | Paul Pierce | Celtics | 219 | 11 | 19.9 |
| 10 | Reggie Lewis | Celtics | 205 | 13 | 15.8 |

=== Per Game (Playoffs) ===
1. Dave Bing (DET) – 28.2 (6 GP)
2. John Havlicek (BOS) – 24.8 (6 GP)
3. Kevin Garnett (BOS) – 22.8 (6 GP)
4. Larry Bird (BOS) – 22.7 (24 GP)
5. Richard Hamilton (DET) – 22.0 (6 GP)

== See also ==
- National Basketball Association rivalries
- Celtics–Lakers rivalry
- 76ers-Celtics rivalry
- Bulls–Pistons rivalry
- Lakers–Pistons rivalry
