= Lakers–Pistons rivalry =

National Basketball Association rivalry

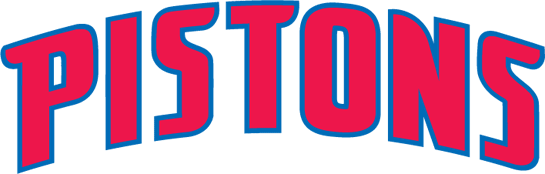
- Los Angeles Lakers Detroit Pistons
- First meeting: December 1, 1948; Pistons 84, Lakers 74
- Latest meeting: March 23, 2026; Lakers 110, Pistons 113
- Next meeting: November 8, 2026

Statistics
- Total meetings: 400
- All-time series: 240–159 (LAL)
- Regular season series: 214–138 (LAL)
- Postseason results: 26–21 (LAL)
- Longest win streak: LAL W13
- Current win streak: DET W4

Postseason history
- 1950 Central Division Finals: Lakers won, 2–0; 1953 Western Division Finals: Lakers won, 3–2; 1954 Western Division Round Robin: Lakers won, 2–0; 1955 Western Division Finals: Pistons won, 3–1; 1957 Western Division Semifinals: Lakers won, 2–0; 1959 Western Division Semifinals: Lakers won, 2–1; 1960 Western Division Semifinals: Lakers won, 2–0; 1961 Western Division Semifinals: Lakers won, 3–2; 1962 Western Division Finals: Lakers won, 4–2; 1988 NBA Finals: Lakers won, 4–3; 1989 NBA Finals: Pistons won, 4–0; 2004 NBA Finals: Pistons won, 4–1

The Lakers–Pistons rivalry is an American professional basketball rivalry between the Los Angeles Lakers and Detroit Pistons. This rivalry, which was showcased three times in the NBA Finals (1988, 1989, 2004), pitted the All-Star filled Lakers teams against the blue collar, team-first oriented Pistons squads. Despite playing the role of underdog in all three of their final round meetings with Los Angeles, Detroit enjoyed significant success against the Lakers, claiming the NBA title against them twice.

== History ==
=== 1950–1962 ===
Prior to facing each other in the 1988, 1989, and 2004 Finals, the Lakers and Pistons squared off in nine postseason series between 1950 and 1962. Both teams originally came from the NBL, one of two predecessors of the NBA. The Lakers were originally the Detroit Gems before moving to Minneapolis, while the Pistons were originally based in Fort Wayne, Indiana before moving to Detroit.

The Lakers, featuring stars such as George Mikan, Elgin Baylor, and Jerry West, defeated the Pistons of Andy Phillip, George Yardley, and Earl Lloyd in eight of the nine playoff meetings. The Lakers would appear in seven NBA Finals and won five titles during that era. The only Pistons victory came in the 1955 playoffs, en route to their first of two consecutive trips to the NBA Finals.

After 1962, the Pistons declined from prominence and would not return to title contention until the mid-1980s with the arrivals of Isiah Thomas, Joe Dumars, Bill Laimbeer, and coach Chuck Daly. Meanwhile, the Lakers appeared in 12 of the next 25 NBA Finals and won five titles behind players such as Baylor, West, Wilt Chamberlain, Magic Johnson, and Kareem Abdul-Jabbar.

Prior to 1978, the Pistons and Lakers were both members of the Western Division/Conference in all but three seasons. Detroit moved to the Eastern Conference before the 1978–79 season, and both teams are currently guaranteed to meet only twice per season.

=== 1988 ===
The Lakers and Pistons renewed their acquaintances in the 1988 NBA Finals. Los Angeles swept the San Antonio Spurs in the opening round, but they needed 7 games to knock off both the Utah Jazz in the Western semifinals and the Dallas Mavericks in the Western Conference Finals. Still, the Lakers, who finished the season with a 62–20 record, were heavily favored to defeat the Pistons and become the first team since the 1969 Boston Celtics to repeat as NBA champions. Detroit finished their campaign with a 54–28 record, they defeated the Washington Bullets in the opening round and the Chicago Bulls in the conference semifinals, both in five games each. They survived a tough, 6-game Eastern Conference Finals series against the Boston Celtics to reach the final round. The series started out with a customary kiss between Magic Johnson and Isiah Thomas, who were close friends off the court. However, there would soon be no love lost between both teams. After defeating the Lakers with a 105–93 shocker in Game 1 at The L.A. Forum, the Pistons fought hard with Los Angeles and even took a 3–2 series lead heading into Game 6, which proved to be a classic battle, with Isiah Thomas overcoming a badly sprained ankle to score 25 points in the 3rd quarter. However, the contest ended on a sour note for Detroit. With the Pistons leading 102–101 with 14 seconds left, a controversial foul was called on Bill Laimbeer, enabling Kareem Abdul-Jabbar to go to the foul line, which has since been dubbed the Phantom Foul. The legend calmly sank two free throws, giving the Lakers a 103–102 victory and helping Los Angeles force a Game 7. Despite a valiant effort by the Pistons, the Lakers managed to escape with a 108–105 win in the deciding game and capture their 5th NBA title of the 1980s. James Worthy scored 36 points, grabbed 16 rebounds, and dished out 10 assists in the seventh game, and was named the NBA Finals MVP for his efforts.

=== 1989 ===
Both the Pistons and Lakers were considered to be the two best teams in the NBA entering the 1989 NBA Finals. Behind the no-nonsense leadership of head coach Chuck Daly, Detroit finished with a franchise best 63–19 record, which was also the best record in the league. After sweeping both the Boston Celtics 3–0 in the first round, and the Milwaukee Bucks 4–0 in the second round, the Pistons eliminated Michael Jordan and the Chicago Bulls in 6 games in the Eastern Conference Finals. Meanwhile, Los Angeles suffered slight slippage in the regular season, finishing with a 57–25 record. However, the Lakers, who still finished first in the Western Conference, compiled an outstanding 11–0 record in the postseason, sweeping the Portland Trail Blazers, Seattle SuperSonics, and Phoenix Suns en route to the finals. Magic Johnson also earned his second NBA MVP award (Johnson, who had already won the award in 1987, would receive his third NBA MVP title in 1990). As the finals began, L.A. was once again favored to eliminate Detroit and successfully three-peat as champions. However, the Pistons were determined to prove that they were ready to overcome the sting of coming up short the previous year, and win the NBA title. L.A.'s hopes for another championship took a turn for the worse when Byron Scott and Johnson both suffered season-ending hamstring injuries. The Pistons' physical style of play and superior defense also proved to be too much for the Lakers to overcome, as Detroit swept Los Angeles in 4 games and captured their 1st ever NBA Championship. Pistons shooting guard Joe Dumars was awarded NBA Finals MVP honors. After the series, Abdul-Jabbar retired. The series would also turn out to be the final time that Pat Riley would make an appearance in the NBA Finals as head coach of the Lakers. This also marked the first time that the NBA Finals ended in a 4-game sweep since the Finals went to the current 2–3–2 format back in 1985. The Pistons successfully defended their crown the following season. They defeated the Trail Blazers in the 1990 NBA Finals 4–1 to repeat as NBA champions.

=== 2004 ===
A whole new of generation of Pistons and Lakers would meet as they squared off again in the 2004 NBA Finals. Los Angeles originally entered the 2003–04 NBA season on a mission to win the championship, due to a multi-talented roster featuring 4 NBA superstars: Shaquille O'Neal, Kobe Bryant, Gary Payton, and Karl Malone. Despite trying to meet high expectations and getting off to a promising start, the Lakers suffered through injuries and turmoil throughout the campaign; Malone struggled with a knee injury which he had to have surgery on, and was limited to playing only 42 games. Payton never grew comfortable learning the nuances of head coach Phil Jackson's triangle offense. Finally, O'Neal and Bryant spent the whole season feuding over who was a more valuable player for the Lakers. Nevertheless, Los Angeles finished with a 56–26 record, winning the Pacific Division title on the last day of the season. Next, the Lakers eliminated the Houston Rockets, San Antonio Spurs, and Minnesota Timberwolves to win the Western Conference crown. The Pistons also struggled through the early part of their season as well. However, their fortunes soon improved vastly thanks to the February acquisition of Rasheed Wallace via trade, and the firm guidance of head coach Larry Brown. Detroit finished with a 54–28 record. Then, they defeated the Milwaukee Bucks, New Jersey Nets, and Indiana Pacers en route to the Eastern Conference title. Just like they had in both 1988 & 1989, the Lakers entered the NBA Finals as the clear favorite to win the championship. Still, the Pistons were not discouraged by their underdog status, stunning Los Angeles with a Game 1 win in L.A. The Lakers pulled out an overtime victory over Detroit in Game 2, thanks to Bryant's game-tying 3-pointer in the final seconds of regulation, enabling L.A. to eventually tie the series. However, as the series shifted to Detroit, the Pistons imposed their will on the Lakers. Their commitment to team basketball and tough, physical defense proved to be insurmountable. L.A.'s title dreams were dashed when Malone reinjured his knee in Game 4, and was unable to suit up for the Lakers in Game 5. The Pistons convincingly won the next 3 games at the Palace of Auburn Hills, and won the series 4–1, capturing their 3rd NBA title overall. At the end of the series, Al Michaels, who was serving as the play-by-play announcer for the NBA on ABC during the finals, observed that even though the Lakers had Hall of Fame players, the Pistons beat L.A. by using players that nobody else wanted. Chauncey Billups, the Pistons' point guard, won the NBA Finals MVP Award. Billups became the first Finals MVP recipient since former Pistons star Joe Dumars to have won the award before making his first NBA All-Star team. Like Dumars, Billups would eventually go on to make multiple appearances in the NBA All-Star Game.

=== 2021: Malice at the Palace 2 ===
On November 21, 2021, two days after the 17th anniversary of the infamous Malice at the Palace, the rivalry got reignited following a brawl that occurred during a game in Detroit. The incident occurred in the third quarter when the Lakers' LeBron James and the Pistons' Isaiah Stewart were jostling for position during a free throw. Their arms appeared to get intertwined and James swung his elbow, striking Stewart, who quickly had blood streaming from above his eye. Stewart was guided away from the spot where the contact occurred by teammates and coaches, though he appeared to become more incensed along the way. He then tried to double back multiple times and run toward James. Stewart was assessed two technical fouls, while James was assessed a flagrant foul 2, and both players were ejected. The next day the NBA announced James had been suspended one game for "recklessly hitting" Pistons' center Stewart in the face during their altercation, while Stewart had been suspended two games for "escalating an on-court altercation by repeatedly and aggressively pursuing" James.

== Season-by-season results ==
Minneapolis Lakers/Los Angeles Lakers vs. Fort Wayne Pistons/Fort Wayne Pistons Season-by-Season Results
1940s (Lakers, 8–4)

Season	Season series		at Minneapolis Lakers	at Fort Wayne Pistons	at Neutral Site	Overall series	Notes
1948–49	Lakers	4–2	Lakers, 3–0	Pistons, 2–1		Lakers, 4–2	Lakers and Pistons join the Basketball Association of America (BAA) from the National Basketball League (NBL) and are placed in the Western Division. Lakers win 1949 BAA Finals.
1949–50	Lakers	4–2	Lakers, 3–0	Pistons, 2–1		Lakers, 8–4	Basketball Association of America and National Basketball League merge to become the National Basketball Association (NBA). Lakers and Pistons briefly join the Central Division.

1950s (Lakers, 68–60)

Season	Season series		at Minneapolis Lakers	at Fort Wayne Pistons/Detroit Pistons	at Neutral Site	Overall series	Notes
1950 Central Division Finals	Lakers	2–0	Lakers, 1–0	Lakers, 1–0		Lakers, 10–4	1st playoff meeting. Lakers go on to win 1950 NBA Finals.
1950–51	Pistons	5–3	Lakers, 2–1	Pistons, 4–0	Lakers, 1–0	Lakers, 13–9	Lakers and Pistons move back to the Western Division. Neutral site game was played at Milwaukee Arena, Milwaukee, Wisconsin. Lakers finish with the best record in the league (44–24).
1951–52	Pistons	5–4	Lakers, 2–1	Pistons, 4–1	Lakers, 1–0	Lakers, 17–14	Neutral site game was played at St. Paul Auditorium, St. Paul, Minnesota. Lakers win 1952 NBA Finals.
1952–53	Lakers	9–1	Lakers, 3–0	Lakers, 3–1	Lakers, 3–0	Lakers, 26–15	Neutral site games were played at: St. Paul Auditorium; War Memorial Coliseum, Fort Wayne, Indiana; Milwaukee Arena.; Lakers finish with the best record in the league (48–22).
1953 Western Division Finals	Lakers	3–2	Lakers, 3–0	Pistons, 2–0		Lakers, 29–17	Lakers would go on to win 1953 NBA Finals.
1953–54	Tie	5–5	Lakers, 3–1	Pistons, 3–1	Tie, 1–1	Lakers, 34–22	Neutral site games were played at: Milwaukee Arena; Buffalo Memorial Auditorium, Buffalo, New York. Lakers finish with the best record in the league (46–26).
1954 Western Division Round-Robin	Lakers	2–0	Lakers, 1–0	Lakers, 1–0		Lakers, 36–22	Only season in NBA history to use round-robin playoff format. Lakers advance by finishing first, while the Pistons were eliminated, finishing last. Lakers would go on to win 1954 NBA Finals.
1954–55	Pistons	9–3	Lakers, 2–1	Pistons, 3–1	Pistons, 5–0	Lakers, 39–31	Neutral site games were played at: Madison Square Garden (III), New York City, New York; Minot State College Fieldhouse, Minot, North Dakota; Elkhart High School, Elkhart, Indiana.; St. Louis Arena, St. Louis, Missouri.; St. Paul Auditorium; Pistons finish with the best record in the league (tied with the Syracuse Nationals) (43–29).
1955 Western Division Finals	Pistons	3–1	Tie, 1–1	Pistons, 2–0		Lakers, 40–34	First Pistons' win in a playoff meeting. Pistons go on to lose 1955 NBA Finals.
1955–56	Lakers	7–5	Lakers, 4–1	Pistons, 4–1	Lakers, 2–0	Lakers, 47–39	Neutral site games were played at: Boston Garden, Boston, Massachusetts; Kiel Auditorium, St. Louis, Missouri.; Pistons lose 1956 NBA Finals.
1956–57	Pistons	7–5	Tie, 2–2	Pistons, 4–1	Lakers, 2–1	Lakers, 52–46	Neutral site games were played at: Rochester Community War Memorial, Rochester, New York; Winnipeg Arena, Winnipeg, Manitoba; St. Louis Arena.
1957 Western Division Semifinals	Lakers	2–0	Lakers, 1–0	Lakers, 1–0		Lakers, 54–46	
1957–58	Tie	6–6	Pistons, 3–2	Lakers, 3–1	Pistons, 2–1	Lakers, 60–52	Neutral site games were played at: Madison Square Garden (III); Convention Hall, Philadelphia, Pennsylvania; Philadelphia Convention Hall and Civic Center.; Pistons relocate to Detroit.
1958–59	Lakers	8–4	Lakers, 3–2	Lakers, 4–0	Pistons, 2–1	Lakers, 68–56	Neutral site games were played at: Madison Square Garden (III); Madison Square Garden (III); Kiel Auditorium; Elgin Baylor makes his debut for the Lakers.
1959 Western Division Semifinals	Lakers	2–1	Lakers, 2–0	Pistons, 1–0		Lakers, 70–57	Lakers go on to lose 1959 NBA Finals.
1959–60	Pistons	7–6	Lakers, 3–2	Tie, 3–3	Pistons, 2–0	Lakers, 76–64	Neutral site games were played at: Madison Square Garden (III); St. Paul Auditorium

1960s (Lakers, 74–36)

Season	Season series		at Minneapolis Lakers/Los Angeles Lakers	at Detroit Pistons	at Neutral site	Overall series	Notes
1960 Western Division Semifinals	Lakers	2–0	Lakers, 1–0	Lakers, 1–0		Lakers, 78–64	
1960–61	Lakers	9–4	Lakers, 3–0	Lakers, 3–2	Lakers, 3–2	Lakers, 87–68	Neutral site games were played at: Cow Palace, Daly City, California; Memorial Coliseum, Portland, Oregon; Memorial Coliseum, Portland; Convention Hall; Madison Square Garden (III); Lakers relocate to Los Angeles. Jerry West makes his debut for the Lakers.
1961 Western Division Semifinals	Lakers	3–2	Lakers, 3–0	Pistons, 2–0		Lakers, 90–70	
1961–62	Lakers	8–4	Lakers, 4–0	Lakers, 3–2	Pistons, 2–1	Lakers, 98–74	Neutral site games were played at: Madison Square Garden (III); Minneapolis Auditorium, Minneapolis, Minnesota; War Memorial Coliseum
1962 Western Division Finals	Lakers	4–2	Lakers, 2–1	Lakers, 2–1		Lakers, 102–76	Lakers record their 100th win over the Pistons. Lakers go on to lose 1962 NBA Finals.
1962–63	Lakers	11–1	Lakers, 4–0	Lakers, 4–1	Lakers, 3–0	Lakers, 113–77	Neutral site games were played at: Madison Square Garden (III); War Memorial Coliseum; Veterans Memorial Auditorium, Des Moines, Iowa. Lakers win 13 straight games against the Pistons (1962–1963). Lakers lose the 1963 NBA Finals.
1963–64	Lakers	7–5	Lakers, 3–2	Lakers, 3–1	Pistons, 2–1	Lakers, 120–82	Neutral site games were played at: Minneapolis Auditorium; War Memorial Coliseum; Sports Arena, Toledo, Ohio.
1964–65	Lakers	7–3	Lakers, 3–1	Lakers, 4–0	Pistons, 2–0	Lakers, 127–85	Neutral site games were played at: Civic Arena, Pittsburgh, Pennsylvania; Cleveland Arena, Cleveland, Ohio. Lakers lose 1965 NBA Finals.
1965–66	Lakers	8–2	Lakers, 4–1	Lakers, 4–0	Pistons, 1–0	Lakers, 135–87	Neutral site game was played at War Memorial Coliseum. Lakers lose 1966 NBA Finals.
1966–67	Pistons	5–4	Tie, 2–2	Pistons, 2–1	Tie, 1–1	Lakers, 139–92	Neutral site games were played at: Montreal Forum, Montréal, Québec; Madison Square Garden (III). Last season the rivalry is played at a neutral site.
1967–68	Lakers	5–2	Lakers, 4–0	Pistons, 2–1		Lakers, 144–94	Pistons move to the Eastern Division. Last season Lakers played at Los Angeles Memorial Sports Arena. On December 31, 1967, Lakers open The Forum. Lakers lose the 1968 NBA Finals.
1968–69	Tie	3–3	Lakers, 2–1	Pistons, 2–1		Lakers, 147–97	Lakers lose 1969 NBA Finals.
1969–70	Tie	3–3	Lakers, 2–1	Pistons, 2–1		Lakers, 150–100	Pistons record their 100th win over the Lakers. Lakers lose 1970 NBA Finals. Elgin Baylor played his final game in this rivalry on March 20, 1970. He missed all ten meetings across the next two seasons before retiring.

1970s (Lakers, 28–17)

Season	Season series		at Los Angeles Lakers	at Detroit Pistons	Overall series	Notes
1970–71	Lakers	3–2	Lakers, 2–1	Tie, 1–1	Lakers, 153–102	Lakers are placed in the Western Conference and the Pacific Division. Pistons move back to the Western Conference, but are placed in the Midwest Division.
1971–72	Lakers	4–1	Tie, 1–1	Lakers, 3–0	Lakers, 157–103	Lakers finish with the best record in the league (69–13). Lakers win 1972 NBA Finals.
1972–73	Lakers	5–1	Lakers, 3–0	Lakers, 2–1	Lakers, 162–104	Lakers lose 1973 NBA Finals.
1973–74	Pistons	4–2	Lakers, 2–1	Pistons, 3–0	Lakers, 164–108	Jerry West played his final game in this rivalry on December 2, 1973. He missed four meetings the rest of the season before retiring.
1974–75	Pistons	3–1	Pistons, 2–0	Tie, 1–1	Lakers, 165–111	
1975–76	Lakers	4–1	Lakers, 3–0	Tie, 1–1	Lakers, 169–112	Kareem Abdul-Jabbar makes his debut for the Lakers.
1976–77	Lakers	3–1	Lakers, 2–0	Tie, 1–1	Lakers, 172–113	Lakers finish with the best record in the league (53–29).
1977–78	Tie	2–2	Tie, 1–1	Tie, 1–1	Lakers, 174–115	
1978–79	Tie	2–2	Tie, 1–1	Tie, 1–1	Lakers, 176–117	Pistons move from the Midwest Division in the Western Conference to the Central Division in the Eastern Conference. Last season where the Lakers and Pistons faced each other more than two games per season.
1979–80	Lakers	2–0	Lakers; 138–122	Lakers; 123–100	Lakers, 178–117	Magic Johnson make his debut for the Lakers. Lakers win 1980 NBA Finals.

1980s (Lakers, 17–14)

Season	Season series		at Los Angeles Lakers	at Detroit Pistons	Overall series	Notes
1980–81	Lakers	2–0	Lakers; 117–108	Lakers; 111–102	Lakers, 180–117	
1981–82	Lakers	2–0	Lakers; 123–111	Lakers; 130–127	Lakers, 182–117	Isiah Thomas makes his debut for the Pistons. Lakers win 1982 NBA Finals.
1982–83	Lakers	2–0	Lakers; 127–112	Lakers; 122–108	Lakers, 184–117	Lakers lose 1983 NBA Finals.
1983–84	Tie	1–1	Pistons; 121–118	Lakers; 118–114	Lakers, 185–118	Lakers lose 1984 NBA Finals.
1984–85	Tie	1–1	Lakers; 148–130	Pistons; 121–98	Lakers, 186–119	Lakers win 1985 NBA Finals.
1985–86	Tie	1–1	Lakers; 132–119	Pistons; 118–115	Lakers, 187–120	
1986–87	Tie	1–1	Lakers; 128–111	Pistons; 119–114	Lakers, 188–121	Lakers finish with the best record in the league (65–17). Lakers win 1987 NBA Finals.
1987–88	Lakers	2–0	Lakers; 117–110	Lakers; 106–104	Lakers, 190–121	Lakers finish with the best record in the league (62–20). Last season Pistons play in the Pontiac Silverdome.
1988 NBA Finals	Lakers	4–3	Lakers, 3–1	Pistons, 2–1	Lakers, 194–124	First meeting in the NBA Finals; First and only series in the rivalry to go to Game 7.
1988–89	Pistons	2–0	Pistons; 110–96	Pistons; 119–110	Lakers, 194–126	Pistons open up The Palace of Auburn Hills. Pistons finish with the best record in the league (63–19).
1989 NBA Finals	Pistons	4–0	Pistons, 2–0	Pistons, 2–0	Lakers, 194–130	First and only sweep in the rivalry. Final season for Kareem Abdul-Jabbar.
1989–90	Tie	1–1	Pistons; 108–97(OT)	Lakers; 107–97	Lakers, 195–131	Lakers finish with the best record in the league (63–19). Pistons win 1990 NBA Finals.

1990s (Lakers, 14–4)

Season	Season series		at Los Angeles Lakers	at Detroit Pistons	Overall series	Notes
1990–91	Lakers	2–0	Lakers; 114–90	Lakers; 102–96	Lakers, 197–131	Lakers lose 1991 NBA Finals.
1991–92	Pistons	2–0	Pistons; 98–93	Pistons; 112–93	Lakers, 197–133	
1992–93	Tie	1–1	Pistons; 106–101	Lakers; 123–121	Lakers, 198–134	
1993–94	Lakers	2–0	Lakers; 105–97	Lakers; 99–93	Lakers, 200–134	Lakers record their 200th win over the Pistons. Final season for Isiah Thomas.
1994–95	Lakers	2–0	Lakers; 105–96	Lakers; 115–98	Lakers, 202–134	
1995–96	Lakers	2–0	Lakers; 87–82	Lakers; 101–98	Lakers, 204–134	Final season for Magic Johnson.
1996–97	Tie	1–1	Pistons; 100–97(2OT)	Lakers; 109–102	Lakers, 205–135	Kobe Bryant makes his debut for the Lakers.
1997–98	Lakers	2–0	Lakers; 96–89	Lakers; 105–103(OT)	Lakers, 207–135	
1999–2000	Lakers	2–0	Lakers; 101–93	Lakers; 110–82	Lakers, 209–135	Due to a delayed Collective Bargaining Agreement, Lakers and Pistons did not play in the 1998 NBA season. Lakers open up Staples Center (now known as Crypto.com Arena). Lakers finish with the best record in the league (67–15). Lakers win 2000 NBA Finals.

2000s (Pistons, 13–12)

Season	Season series		at Los Angeles Lakers	at Detroit Pistons	Overall series	Notes
2000–01	Lakers	2–0	Lakers; 112–88	Lakers; 125–119(OT)	Lakers, 211–135	Lakers win 2001 NBA Finals.
2001–02	Lakers	2–0	Lakers; 94–82	Lakers; 121–92	Lakers, 213–135	Lakers win 2002 NBA Finals.
2002–03	Tie	1–1	Lakers; 95–85	Pistons; 111–88	Lakers, 214–136	
2003–04	Tie	1–1	Lakers; 94–89	Pistons; 106–96	Lakers, 215–137	
2004 NBA Finals	Pistons	4–1	Tie, 1–1	Pistons, 3–0	Lakers, 216–141	
2004–05	Pistons	2–0	Pistons; 111–90	Pistons; 103–81	Lakers, 216–143	Pistons lose 2005 NBA Finals.
2005–06	Tie	1–1	Lakers; 105–94	Pistons; 102–93	Lakers, 217–144	Pistons finish with the best record in the league (64–18).
2006–07	Pistons	2–0	Pistons; 97–83	Pistons; 93–78	Lakers, 217–146	
2007–08	Tie	1–1	Lakers; 103–91	Pistons; 90–89	Lakers, 218–147	Lakers lose 2008 NBA Finals.
2008–09	Tie	1–1	Pistons; 106–95	Lakers; 92–77	Lakers, 219–148	Lakers win 2009 NBA Finals.
2009–10	Lakers	2–0	Lakers; 106–93	Lakers; 93–81	Lakers, 221–148	Lakers win 2010 NBA Finals.

2010s (Lakers, 12–6)

Season	Season series		at Los Angeles Lakers	at Detroit Pistons	Overall series	Notes
2010–11	Lakers	2–0	Lakers; 108–83	Lakers; 103–90	Lakers, 223–148	
2011–12	Pistons	1–0		Pistons; 88–85	Lakers, 223–149	Lockout shortened season results in one game played between the rivals.
2012–13	Lakers	2–0	Lakers; 108–79	Lakers; 98–97	Lakers, 225–149	
2013–14	Lakers	2–0	Lakers; 114–99	Lakers; 106–102	Lakers, 227–149	
2014–15	Lakers	2–0	Lakers; 93–85	Lakers; 106–96	Lakers, 229–149	
2015–16	Tie	1–1	Lakers; 97–85	Pistons; 111–91	Lakers, 230–150	Final season for Kobe Bryant.
2016–17	Pistons	2–0	Pistons; 102–97	Pistons; 121–102	Lakers, 230–152	
2017–18	Tie	1–1	Lakers; 113–93	Pistons; 112–106	Lakers, 231–153	
2018–19	Tie	1–1	Lakers; 113–100	Pistons; 111–97	Lakers, 232–154	LeBron James signs with the Lakers.
2019–20	Lakers	1–0	Lakers; 106–99		Lakers, 233–154	Due to the COVID-19 pandemic suspending the season, the game scheduled in Detroit was canceled. Lakers win 2020 NBA Finals.

2020s (Lakers, 7–5)

Season	Season series		at Los Angeles Lakers	at Detroit Pistons	Overall series	Notes
2020–21	Tie	1–1	Lakers; 135–129(2OT)	Pistons; 107–92	Lakers, 234–155	
2021–22	Lakers	2–0	Lakers; 110–106	Lakers; 121–116	Lakers, 236–155	
2022–23	Lakers	2–0	Lakers; 128–121	Lakers; 124–117	Lakers, 238–155	
2023–24	Lakers	2–0	Lakers; 125–111	Lakers; 133–107	Lakers, 240–155	Lakers win the inaugural 2023 NBA Cup.
2024–25	Pistons	2–0	Pistons; 117–114	Pistons; 115–103	Lakers, 240–157	First season with Luka Doncic as a Laker.
2025–26	Pistons	2–0	Pistons; 128–106	Pistons; 113–110	Lakers, 240–159	Final season with LeBron James as a Laker.
2026–27	Tie	0-0	January 8th, 2027	November 8th, 2026	Lakers, 240–159	

Summary of Results

Season	Season series		at Minneapolis Lakers/Los Angeles Lakers	at Fort Wayne Pistons/Detroit Pistons	at Neutral Site	Notes
Regular season games	Lakers	214–138	Lakers, 111–41	Lakers, 82–74	Pistons, 23–21	
Postseason games	Lakers	26–21	Lakers, 19–6	Pistons, 15–7	N/A	
Postseason series	Lakers	8–3	N/A	N/A	N/A	NBA Finals: 1988, 1989, 2004; Central Division Finals: 1950; Western Division Finals: 1953, 1955, 1962; Western Division Semifinals: 1957, 1959, 1960, 1961
Regular and postseason	Lakers	240–159	Lakers, 130–47	Tie, 89–89	Pistons, 23–21	There were 44 total Neutral site games played.

== Individual Records ==
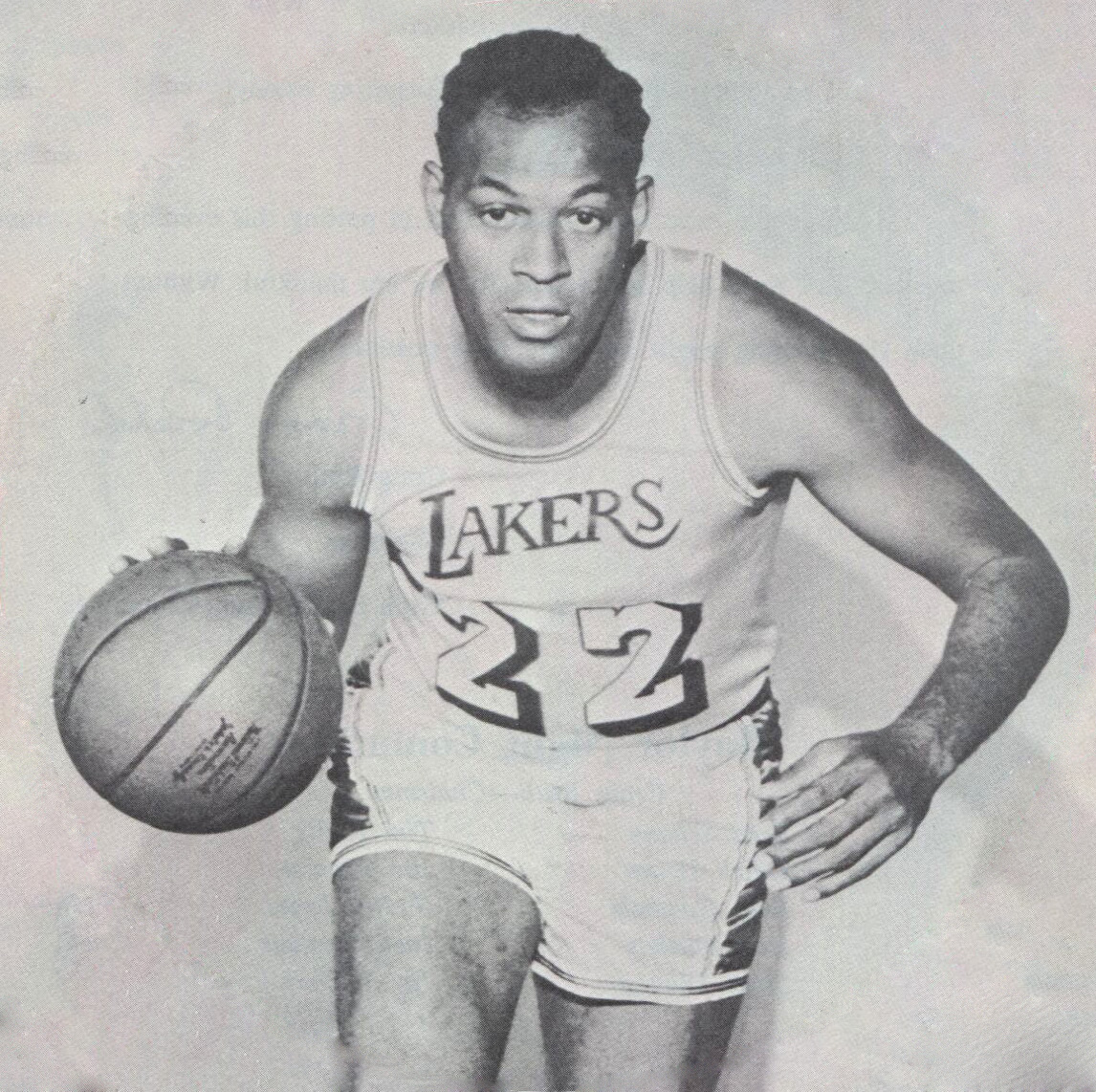
Elgin Baylor scored the most points in this rivalry.

=== Top Scorers (Regular Season) ===
Rank	Player	Team	Points	GP	PPG
1	Elgin Baylor	Lakers	3,190	110	29.0
2	Jerry West	Lakers	2,780	99	28.1
3	George Yardley	Pistons	1,347	60	20.4
4	Vern Mikkelsen	Lakers	1,345	103	13.1
5	Gene Shue	Pistons	1,344	74	15.3

==== Per Game (Regular Season, min. 10 GP) ====
1. Elgin Baylor (LAL) – 29.0 (110 GP)
2. Jerry West (LAL) – 28.1 (99 GP)
3. Shaquille O'Neal (LAL) – 26.9 (14 GP)
4. LeBron James (LAL) – 25.2 (10 GP)
5. Bob Lanier (DET) – 23.9 (38 GP)
6. Kareem Abdul-Jabbar (LAL) – 23.4 (35 GP)

=== Top Scorers (NBA Playoffs) ===
Rank	Player	Team	Points	GP	PPG
1	Elgin Baylor	Lakers	550	16	34.4
2	Gene Shue	Pistons	326	18	18.1
3	Jerry West	Lakers	293	11	26.6
4	James Worthy	Lakers	256	11	23.3
5	Isiah Thomas	Pistons	223	11	20.3

==== Per Game (NBA Playoffs) ====
1. Elgin Baylor (LAL) – 34.4 (16 GP)
2. Jerry West (LAL) – 26.6 (11 GP)
3. Shaquille O'Neal (LAL) – 26.6 (5 GP)
4. George Mikan – 24.1 (9 GP)
5. James Worthy (LAL) – 23.3 (11 GP)
6. Kobe Bryant (LAL) – 22.6 (5 GP)
7. Richard Hamilton (DET) – 21.7 (5 GP)

== See also ==
- Bulls–Pistons rivalry
- Celtics–Pistons rivalry
- Celtics–Lakers rivalry
- Lakers–Spurs rivalry
- List of NBA rivalries
