= Richard Hamilton (basketball) =

American basketball player (born 1978)

Rip Hamilton
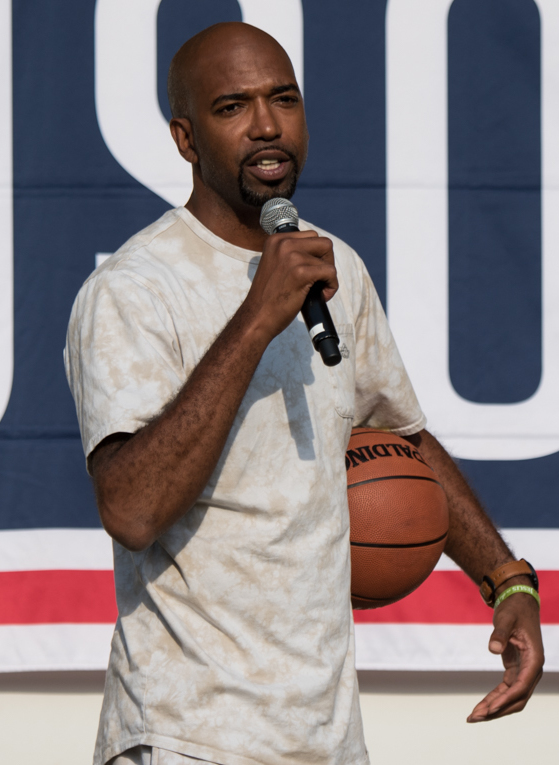
- Hamilton speaking at a USO event in 2018

Personal information
- Born: February 14, 1978 (age 48) Coatesville, Pennsylvania, U.S.
- Listed height: 6 ft 7 in (2.01 m)
- Listed weight: 193 lb (88 kg)

Career information
- High school: Coatesville Area (Coatesville, Pennsylvania)
- College: UConn (1996–1999)
- NBA draft: 1999: 1st round, 7th overall pick
- Drafted by: Washington Wizards
- Playing career: 1999–2013
- Position: Shooting guard / small forward
- Number: 32

Career history
- 1999–2002: Washington Wizards
- 2002–2011: Detroit Pistons
- 2011–2013: Chicago Bulls

Career highlights
- NBA champion (2004); 3× NBA All-Star (2006–2008); No. 32 retired by Detroit Pistons; NCAA champion (1999); NCAA Final Four Most Outstanding Player (1999); Consensus first-team All-American (1999); Consensus second-team All-American (1998); 2× Big East Player of the Year (1998, 1999); 2× First-team All-Big East (1998, 1999); No. 32 retired by UConn Huskies; McDonald's All-American (1996); Second-team Parade All-American (1996)

Career statistics
- Points: 15,708 (17.1 ppg)
- Rebounds: 2,852 (3.2 rpg)
- Assists: 3,125 (3.4 apg)
- Stats at NBA.com
- Stats at Basketball Reference
- Collegiate Basketball Hall of Fame
Medals
Men's basketball
Representing United States
FIBA Americas Championship
Gold medal – first place	1999 San Juan	Team competition

Richard Clay "Rip" Hamilton (born February 14, 1978) is an American former professional basketball player and current basketball analyst for CBS Sports HQ. Hamilton played 14 seasons in the National Basketball Association (NBA) and is best known for his nine-year stint with the Detroit Pistons, where he was a three-time All-Star. He helped lead the Pistons to six straight Eastern Conference Finals appearances, back to back NBA Finals appearances, their best record in franchise history (64–18 in 2005–06) and the 2004 NBA championship.

Born and raised in Coatesville, Pennsylvania, a city 40 miles (64 km) west of Philadelphia, Hamilton played college basketball for three years with the UConn Huskies. In his third and final year, Hamilton was named the Final Four's Most Outstanding Player en route to an upset NCAA Championship win over the favored Duke Blue Devils. He is the second-leading scorer in Connecticut Huskies history.

Named a consensus first-team All-American, Hamilton decided to forgo his senior year and enter the NBA draft. Drafted seventh overall by the Washington Wizards where he would spend the next three seasons, Hamilton notably averaged 20 points per game starting next to Michael Jordan. Traded to Detroit for Jerry Stackhouse in 2002, Hamilton played with the Pistons for nine seasons before ending his career with two final seasons with the Chicago Bulls. The Pistons retired his No. 32 jersey on February 26, 2017.

== College career ==
Hamilton played college basketball at the University of Connecticut from 1996 to 1999. In a 1998 Sweet 16 game with the 2-seeded UConn vs the 11th-seeded Washington Huskies, Hamilton hit a game-winning shot as time ran out after rebounding a missed shot by Jake Voskuhl and then his own shot attempt. He was named the 1999 NCAA tournament's Most Outstanding Player after UConn's run to that year's national title after averaging 24.2 points per game. Number 1 UConn's race to the top also included a close, physical defeat of the national Cinderella team no. 10 Gonzaga Bulldogs, in which Hamilton played a key role as UConn's leading scorer in the game. The UConn squad beat a Duke team in the final game after which four Duke players were drafted in the top 14 of the 1999 NBA draft. The Huskies were nine-point underdogs, but upset the Blue Devils after Hamilton contributed 27 points, 7 rebounds, and 3 assists in the final game. The "One Shining Moment" video and song had one of Hamilton's shots against Duke as the last shot shown in the video.

== Professional career ==
Hamilton was selected with the 7th pick in the 1999 NBA draft by the Washington Wizards. In his first career game, Hamilton recorded 10 points in almost 16 minutes of playing time on a 94–87 win over the visiting Atlanta Hawks. On November 12, Hamilton recorded 13 points and a career-high 8 rebounds on a 104–95 loss to the Miami Heat. In his rookie season, he played in 71 games with 12 starts and averaged 9 points a game backing up veteran shooting guard Mitch Richmond. The Wizards won 29 games, however, and failed to make the playoffs.

In the following year, Hamilton played more at the small forward position and started in 42 of 78 games and doubled his scoring average to 18.1 points a game. On November 8, 2000, Hamilton recorded a career-high 30 points, 3 rebounds and 3 steals in a 102–86 home loss to the New Jersey Nets. The Wizards did not improve, however, winning only 19 games for the season. In the off-season, Michael Jordan announced that he would return to the court for the Wizards, and Doug Collins was hired to coach the team.

With Jordan now the team's small forward, Hamilton moved back to shooting guard and assumed the starting role. Hamilton and Jordan were limited to 60 games due to injuries, but the duo helped improve the team's final record to 37–45, effectively an 18-game improvement over the previous season. Though they missed the playoffs, Hamilton averaged 20 points a game for the season while finishing second in the league in free throw percentage, shooting 89 percent from the free throw line.

=== Detroit Pistons (2002–2011) ===
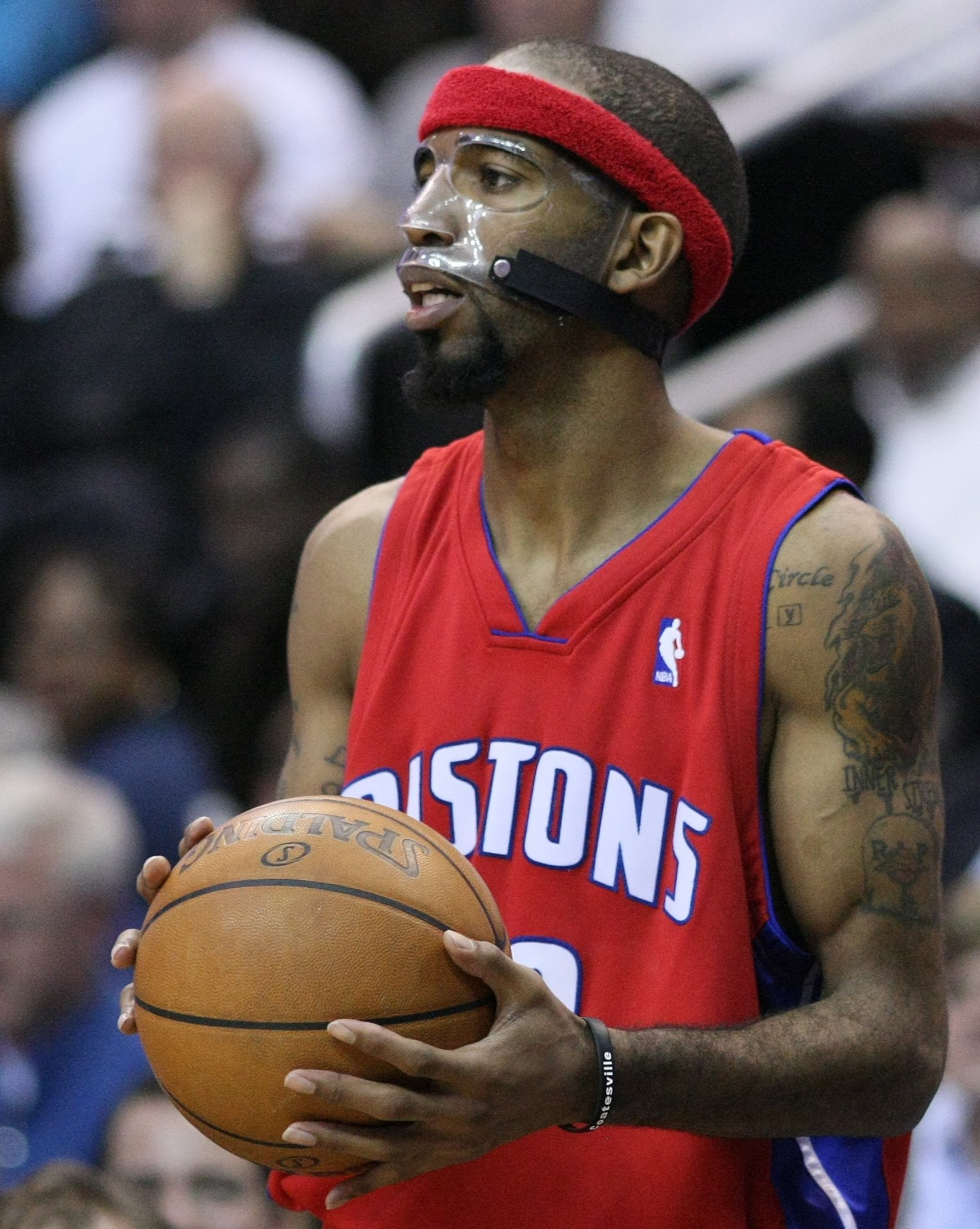
Hamilton began wearing a face mask in 2003 that became his trademark.

In September, the Wizards traded Hamilton to the Detroit Pistons, along with Bobby Simmons and Hubert Davis, in exchange for Ratko Varda, Brian Cardinal, and All-Star scorer Jerry Stackhouse. During the 2002 off-season, the Pistons also traded for Chauncey Billups and drafted forward Tayshaun Prince. The Pistons already featured reigning Coach of the Year Rick Carlisle and Defensive Player of the Year Ben Wallace.

In his first career game with the Pistons, Hamilton recorded 22 points and 6 rebounds in an 86–77 win over the visiting New York Knicks.

Hamilton started all 82 games for Detroit and led the team in scoring with 19.7 points per game as the team won 50 games and the Central Division. In Hamilton's playoff series debut, he helped rally the team from a 3–1 deficit against Tracy McGrady and the Orlando Magic, to win the series in seven games. They defeated Philadelphia 76ers in the conference semifinals and returned to the Conference Finals for the first time since 1991. They faced the defending conference-champion New Jersey Nets, who overwhelmed the Pistons with their experience and swept the series in four games. Hamilton led Detroit in scoring throughout the playoffs with 22.5 points per game on 44 percent shooting.

==== Championship win and return to the Finals: 2004–2005 ====
Through the early part of the 2003–04 season, Hamilton broke his nose twice (he also broke it in 2002) and was advised to wear a face mask to prevent needing significant nasal reconstructive surgery. The clear plastic face mask became his trademark and he would wear it for the rest of his playing career. The season also marked the arrival of All-Star forward Rasheed Wallace who teamed with Hamilton, Billups, Ben Wallace, and Prince under new head coach Larry Brown to lay the foundation of what would become known as the "Goin' to Work" Pistons.

Now wearing the mask on a nightly basis (he called the mask his "Superman cape"), Hamilton led the Pistons in scoring for the second consecutive season with 17.6 points per game as the Pistons finished the season with 54 wins. Hamilton scored a then career-high 44 points on 15-for-23 shooting from the field as the Pistons won 92–88 at home against the Cavaliers.

In the playoffs, the Pistons dominated the Milwaukee Bucks in the first round before setting up a rematch with New Jersey. In a back-and-forth seven-game series against the Nets, Hamilton scored 21 points and grabbed 6 rebounds in the decisive Game 7 victory, as the Pistons came back from a 3–2 deficit. The Pistons then faced the league-leading Indiana Pacers in the conference finals, and the team's defense and efficient scoring proved too much for the favored Pacers. Hamilton scored 33 points in an 83–65 Game 5 victory in Indiana, and Detroit wrapped up the series in the following game 69–65 at home to advance to the franchise's first NBA Finals since the "Bad Boys" Pistons team won the NBA title in 1990. Hamilton contributed 21 points, 5 rebounds and 5 assists in that Game 6 win over the Pacers.

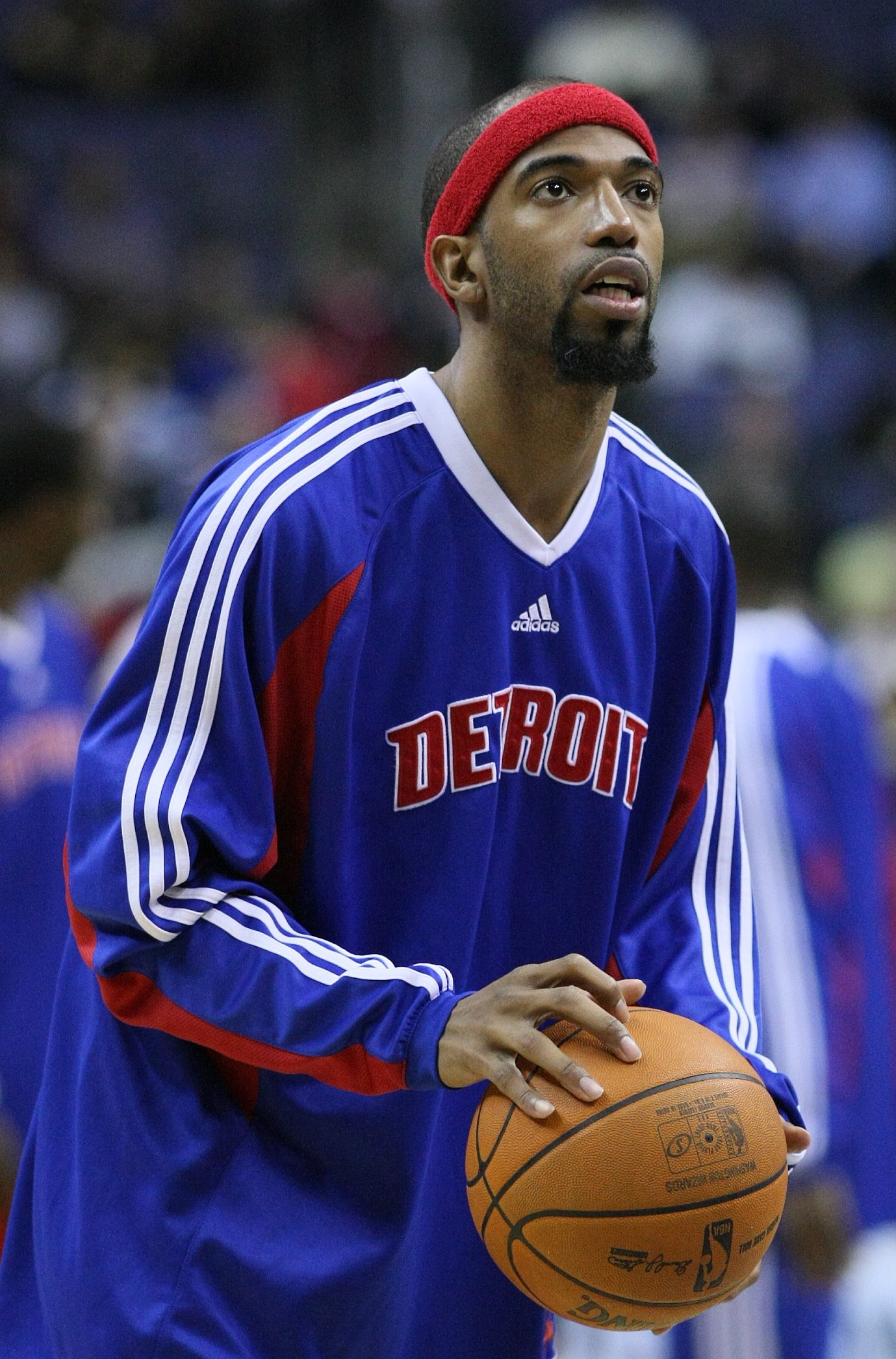
Hamilton led the Pistons in scoring for eight consecutive seasons.

The Pistons were viewed as a major underdog in the Finals, as they faced the star-studded Los Angeles Lakers, who were just one season removed from winning three straight championships. Adding a new chapter to the Lakers–Pistons rivalry of the late 1980s and early 1990s, the Pistons dominated game 1 in Los Angeles and shocked the Lakers 87–75. The Lakers bounced back in game 2 with an overtime win to send the series to Detroit tied at 1–1. Through the three games in Detroit, the Pistons' defense and efficient scoring dismantled Los Angeles to win the championship in five games. Hamilton led the Pistons with 21.4 points per game in the Finals, and scored 31 points in their 88–68 Game 3 win.

Entering the season determined to repeat as champions, Hamilton led the team in scoring for the third consecutive season, averaging 18.7 points per game. On January 6, 2005, Hamilton was 0-for-10 from the field, but hit 14-of-14 free throws to pace the Pistons in a 101–79 loss to the Memphis Grizzlies, becoming the only player in NBA history to lead his team in scoring in a game despite not making a single field goal.

As the second seed in the playoffs, Detroit defeated Philadelphia before another rematch with Indiana. In a match-up overshadowed by the brawl between the two teams earlier in the season, the champs overcame a 2–1 series deficit with Hamilton scoring 28 points in the decisive game six victory. In the conference finals against the Miami Heat led by Shaquille O'Neal, who had arrived via trade from Los Angeles, and Dwyane Wade, the Pistons responded to a 3–2 deficit with two straight victories and advanced to the NBA Finals for a second consecutive year. Hamilton scored 24 in game 7.

Detroit faced the San Antonio Spurs in the Finals, led by all-stars such as Tim Duncan, Tony Parker, and Manu Ginóbili. The Spurs won the first two games of the series, before the Pistons responded with two wins of their own before the Spurs took a 3–2 lead after a win in Detroit in the fifth game. Detroit responded on the road in game 6, with Hamilton scoring 23 points. The Spurs proved too much in game 7, however, winning the game and the series. Hamilton averaged 20 points throughout the 2005 playoffs.

==== Three All-Star selections: 2006–2008 ====
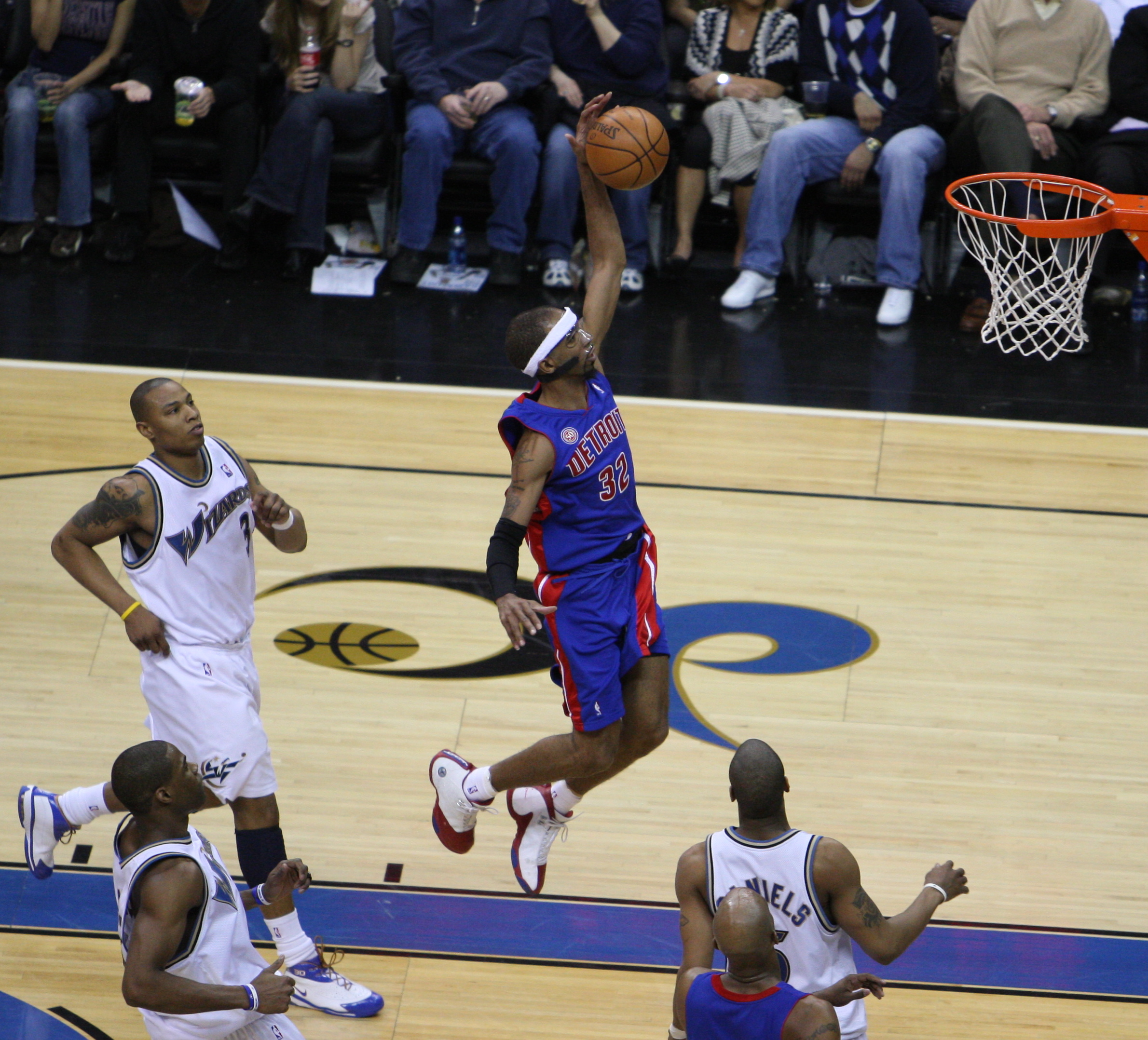
Hamilton dunks the basketball in 2008

The 2005–06 season would prove to be another great one individually for Hamilton, as he averaged a career-high 20.1 points a game and earned his first All-Star Game selection. He also led the league in three-point field goal percentage with .458, as the Pistons excelled throughout the season and won a franchise-record 64 games. Detroit once again ran through the first round of the playoffs, against Milwaukee, with Hamilton scoring 40 points in the series-clinching fifth game. Up next were the Cleveland Cavaliers, who were led by forward LeBron James. The series reached seven games before the Pistons put away the younger Cavaliers. This set up a rematch with Miami, and while the Pistons had home court advantage they had no answer for the dominant play of Dwyane Wade, and lost in six games. Hamilton scored 33 points in game 6 and averaged 20.4 points in the 2006 Playoffs. Miami advanced to the Finals and won the NBA title. After the season, Ben Wallace signed with the Chicago Bulls, changing the dynamic of the Pistons' identity.

During the 2006–07 season, on December 27, Hamilton scored a career-high 51 points with 19-for-37 field goal shooting in a 151–145 triple-overtime Pistons loss to the New York Knicks, becoming the first opposing player since Michael Jordan to score over 50 points at Madison Square Garden. Hamilton averaged 19.8 points during the season and was once again selected to represent the Eastern Conference at the 2007 NBA All-Star Game. The Pistons won 53 games, and swept the Orlando Magic in the first round of the playoffs before defeating Chicago and Wallace in the conference semifinals. This set up a rematch with the younger Cleveland Cavaliers team, but this time the Cavaliers peaked after the series tied at 2–2, and won the next two games to win the series. Hamilton averaged 18.8 points throughout the 2007 playoffs.

With back-to-back losses in the conference finals and the rise of teams such as the Cavaliers, Orlando Magic, and Boston Celtics in the Eastern Conference, the Pistons entered the 2007–08 season in unfamiliar territory. They were however able to win 59 games and still secure the Central Division title. Hamilton averaged 17.3 points a game for Detroit, and was selected as an All-Star for the third straight year. He also participated in the Foot Locker Three-Point Shootout.

The Pistons defeated Philadelphia in the first round before holding off the young Orlando Magic led by Dwight Howard, with Hamilton scoring 32 points in the 5th game and 31 points in the 6th game, as he surpassed Isiah Thomas as the Pistons' all-time leading scorer in the playoffs. Detroit advanced to their sixth straight appearance in the Eastern Conference Finals, but fell to the Boston Celtics in six games. After the loss, Joe Dumars acknowledged it was probably the end of an era, signaling the team's impending changes. Indeed, changes began immediately when Flip Saunders was dismissed as head coach, despite the best winning percentage in Pistons history.

==== Playing without Billups: 2008–2011 ====
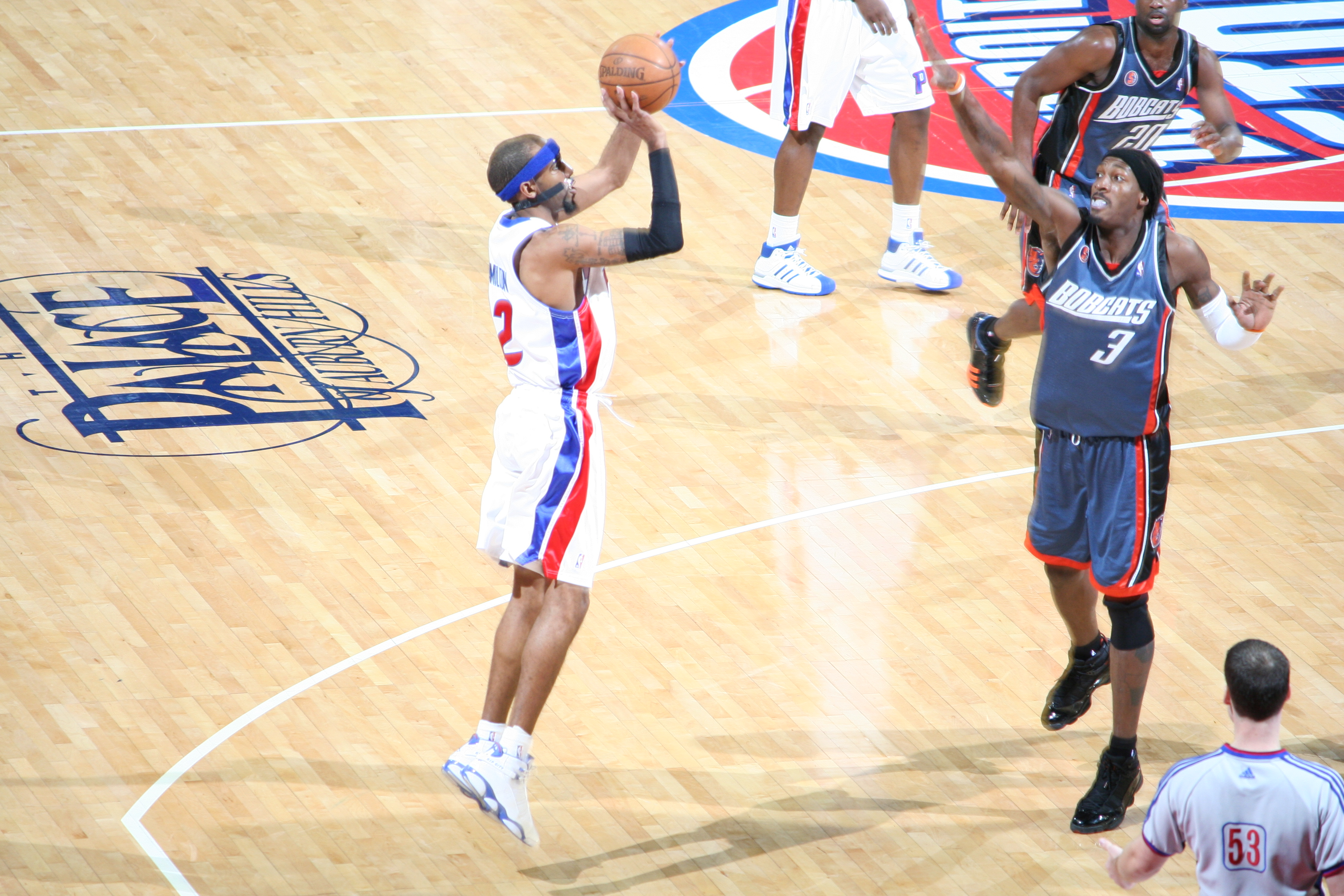
Hamilton shoots a jump shot in a game with the Pistons in 2009.

Just two games into the 2008–09 season, Detroit traded Hamilton's longtime backcourt mate Chauncey Billups in exchange for former MVP Allen Iverson. Despite expressing his disappointment with the trade, Hamilton agreed to a three-year, $34 million contract extension to remain in Detroit. Hamilton averaged 18.3 points per game during the season, including a 38-point effort as a reserve in an overtime game against Milwaukee, the most by a Piston reserve in history. He also posted a career-high 16 assists on March 13 against the Toronto Raptors. However, the backcourt rotation of Hamilton, Iverson, Will Bynum, and Rodney Stuckey failed to mesh well under coach Michael Curry, and Detroit posted their first losing record with Hamilton on the team. They still qualified for the 8th seed in the playoffs, but they were swept by Cleveland in the first round. After the season, Iverson and Rasheed Wallace departed the team.

Hamilton played in 46 games in the 2009–10 season and averaged 18.1 points a game. Detroit won 27 games that year, despite the return of Ben Wallace and the addition of younger players. The following year, Hamilton feuded frequently with then-head hoach John Kuester, including verbally berating Kuester in front of the team during a practice. This feud led to Kuester's benching of Hamilton. In more than six weeks, Hamilton only played 20 total minutes and received a DNP-CD (did not play – coach's decision), where he was on the active roster but did not play in 23 out of 24 games. Despite Kuester's firing by the Pistons after the 2010–11 season, Hamilton's contract was bought out by the Pistons in December 2011, making him an unrestricted free agent.

=== Chicago Bulls (2011–2013) ===
Hamilton cleared waivers on December 14, 2011, and quickly signed a three-year, $15 million contract with the Chicago Bulls, with the third year being a team option. During the 2011–12 season, he averaged 11.6 points per game, 3 rebounds per game, and 2.4 assists per game in 24.9 minutes per game. Due to injuries, he only played 28 games (starting all of them). The Bulls finished 50–16, clinching the first playoff seed in the Eastern Conference. However, the team lost All-Star Derrick Rose to a torn ACL in the first game of the playoffs and were defeated in six games by the eighth-seeded Philadelphia 76ers.

In the 2012–13 season, Hamilton averaged 9.8 points per game, 2.4 assists per game, and 1.7 rebounds per game in 21.8 minutes per game. He played 50 games, starting in 45 of them. On November 26, 2012, Hamilton scored a season-high 30 points, but missed a shot as time expired that would have won the game, in a 93–92 loss to the Milwaukee Bucks. The Bulls finished 45–37; they ranked 5th in the Eastern Conference and 2nd in the Central Division. The team reached the second round of the playoffs, but were eliminated by the Miami Heat. The Bulls declined their option on Hamilton's contract on July 10, 2013, making him a free agent.

On February 26, 2015, Hamilton officially announced his retirement from the NBA on the ESPN program His & Hers. This was just months after he sustained a "freak" foot injury in October 2014, which ultimately convinced him to retire from the game.

On February 26, 2017, the Pistons retired Hamilton's no. 32 jersey.

== Media appearances ==
In the 2006–07 NBA season Hamilton appeared in the NBA Fundamentals series, hosted by TNT, where basketball players showcase certain aspects of the game. Hamilton explained the topic "moving without the ball" to shake off your defender.

He was also a contestant on an episode of the game show series Wanna Bet?.

He has worked with many charities, including the Read to Achieve program and reading books to children. As part of his long-time work with children, he has appeared on an episode of Disney Channel's Imagination Movers. He helped the gang play basketball and learn a lesson of friendship.

== Personal life ==
On October 31, 2007, Hamilton's girlfriend, former So Plush member T. J. Lottie gave birth to Richard Clay Hamilton II. On July 11, 2009, Hamilton married Lottie in Boca Raton, Florida. Special guests included Dwyane Wade, Rasheed Wallace, Chauncey Billups, Michael Jordan, and many others.

In April 2009, Hamilton filed a suit against former personal assistant and business manager Josh Nochimson, claiming that Nochimson stole over $1 million by unauthorized use of Hamilton's credit card from 2003 to 2008.

He inherited the nickname "Rip" from his father who received it from his mother due to the elder's habit of ripping his diaper off as an infant.

== Career statistics ==
Legend
GP	Games played	GS	Games started	MPG	Minutes per game
FG%	Field goal percentage	3P%	3-point field goal percentage	FT%	Free throw percentage
RPG	Rebounds per game	APG	Assists per game	SPG	Steals per game
BPG	Blocks per game	PPG	Points per game	**Bold**	Career high
†	Won an NBA championship	*	Led the league

=== College ===
Year	Team	GP	GS	MPG	FG%	3P%	FT%	RPG	APG	SPG	BPG	PPG
1996–97	Connecticut	32	32	30.6	.386	.376	.784	4.3	**2.8**	1.3	**.3**	15.9
1997–98	Connecticut	**37**	**37**	**32.5**	.440	**.404**	**.843**	4.4	2.4	**1.5**	.2	**21.5**
1998–99	Connecticut	34	34	32.1	**.443**	.347	.833	**4.8**	2.7	1.2	**.3**	**21.5**
Career		103	103	31.8	.426	.378	.826	4.5	2.6	1.3	.3	19.8

=== NBA ===
==== Regular season ====
Year	Team	GP	GS	MPG	FG%	3P%	FT%	RPG	APG	SPG	BPG	PPG
1999–00	Washington	71	12	19.3	.420	.364	.774	1.8	1.5	.4	.1	9.0
2000–01	Washington	78	42	32.3	.438	.274	.868	3.1	2.9	1.0	.1	18.1
2001–02	Washington	63	57	35.0	.435	.381	**.890**	3.4	2.7	.6	**.2**	20.0
2002–03	Detroit	**82**	**82***	32.2	.443	.269	.833	**3.9**	3.5	.8	**.2**	19.7
2003–04†	Detroit	78	78	35.5	.455	.265	.868	3.6	4.0	**1.3**	**.2**	17.6
2004–05	Detroit	76	76	**38.5**	.440	.305	.858	**3.9**	**4.9**	1.0	**.2**	18.7
2005–06	Detroit	80	80	35.3	**.491**	**.458***	.845	3.2	3.4	.7	**.2**	**20.1**
2006–07	Detroit	75	75	36.8	.468	.341	.861	3.8	3.8	.8	**.2**	19.8
2007–08	Detroit	72	72	33.7	.484	.440	.833	3.3	4.2	1.0	.1	17.3
2008–09	Detroit	67	51	34.0	.447	.368	.848	3.1	4.4	.6	.1	18.3
2009–10	Detroit	46	46	33.7	.409	.297	.846	2.7	4.4	.7	.1	18.1
2010–11	Detroit	55	39	27.2	.429	.382	.849	2.3	3.1	.7	.1	14.1
2011–12	Chicago	28	28	24.9	.452	.370	.784	2.4	3.0	.4	.0	11.6
2012–13	Chicago	50	45	21.8	.429	.308	.857	1.7	2.4	.5	.1	9.8
Career		921	783	32.1	.449	.346	.852	3.1	3.4	.8	.1	17.1
All-Star		3	0	15.3	.458	.500	.000	2.0	1.3	.0	.0	7.7

==== Playoffs ====
Year	Team	GP	GS	MPG	FG%	3P%	FT%	RPG	APG	SPG	BPG	PPG
2003	Detroit	17	17	38.8	.442	.333	.906	3.9	2.6	.8	.1	**22.5**
2004†	Detroit	23	23	40.2	.447	.385	.848	**4.6**	4.2	1.2	.0	21.5
2005	Detroit	**25**	**25**	**43.2**	.453	.294	.798	4.3	4.3	.8	.1	20.0
2006	Detroit	18	18	38.3	.413	.350	.851	2.9	2.7	.9	.3	20.4
2007	Detroit	16	16	39.9	.429	.400	.865	4.3	3.8	.9	.1	18.8
2008	Detroit	17	17	38.6	**.470**	.308	**.911**	4.2	3.9	**1.4**	**.5**	21.6
2009	Detroit	4	4	38.5	.356	.200	.900	2.8	**5.0**	1.3	.3	13.3
2012	Chicago	6	6	28.5	.414	.333	.818	3.2	3.0	.2	.0	13.0
2013	Chicago	4	0	17.0	.370	**.429**	.750	.8	1.3	.3	**.5**	6.5
Career		130	126	38.8	.439	.340	.860	3.9	3.6	.9	.2	19.8

== Awards and honors ==
NBA

- NBA champion (2004)
- 3× NBA All-Star (2006, 2007, 2008)
- NBA 3-point field goal percentage leader (2006)
- No. 32 retired by Detroit Pistons
- Inducted 2023 into the Michigan Sports Hall of Fame

College

- NCAA champion (1999)
- NCAA Final Four Most Outstanding Player (1999)
- Consensus first-team All-American (1999)
- Consensus second-team All-American (1998)
- 2× Big East Player of the Year (1998, 1999)
- 2× Big East All-Tournament Team (1998, 1999)
- 2× Big East leader in season points (1998, 1999)
- Big East All-Rookie Team (1997)
- Second-leading scorer in UConn history (2,036 points)
- Number 32 jersey retired by the University of Connecticut

== See also ==
- List of NBA franchise career scoring leaders
