= 2004 NBA Finals =

2004 basketball championship series

Team	Coach	Wins
Detroit Pistons	Larry Brown	4
Los Angeles Lakers	Phil Jackson	1
- Dates: June 6–15
- MVP: Chauncey Billups (Detroit Pistons)
- Hall of Famers: Pistons: Chauncey Billups (2024); Ben Wallace (2021); Lakers: Kobe Bryant (2020); Karl Malone (2010); Shaquille O'Neal (2016); Gary Payton (2013); Coaches: Larry Brown (2002); Phil Jackson (2007); Tex Winter (2011); Officials: Dick Bavetta (2015); Danny Crawford (2025); Joey Crawford (2026)
- Eastern finals: Pistons defeated Pacers, 4–2
- Western finals: Lakers defeated Timberwolves, 4–2

The 2004 NBA Finals was the championship round of the National Basketball Association's (NBA) 2003–04 season, and the conclusion of the season's playoffs. This season's NBA Finals was contested between the Western Conference playoff champion Los Angeles Lakers and the Eastern Conference playoff champion Detroit Pistons. The Lakers held home court advantage, and the series was played under a best-of-seven format.

This was the third NBA Finals matchup in the history of the Lakers-Pistons rivalry. Although the Lakers, headed by Kobe Bryant and Shaquille O'Neal, were considered the heavy favorites, the underdog Pistons handily won the series in five games. The series is commonly referred to as a "five-game sweep" because Detroit dominated in each of their four wins while the Lakers barely managed to win Game 2 in overtime. This marked the Pistons' third NBA championship and their first since their back-to-back championships in 1989 and 1990. The series ultimately featured the perceived underdog Pistons dominating a Lakers team that included four future Hall of Famers. Pistons' owner William Davidson became the first owner in American sports history to win two championships in one calendar year; eight days earlier, his Tampa Bay Lightning defeated the Calgary Flames to win the NHL's Stanley Cup Finals in seven games.

As of 2026, this is the most recent major professional sports championship to be won by a Detroit-based team at their home venue.

== Background ==
This was the first Finals to use the cursive script for the logo since 1995.

=== Los Angeles Lakers ===
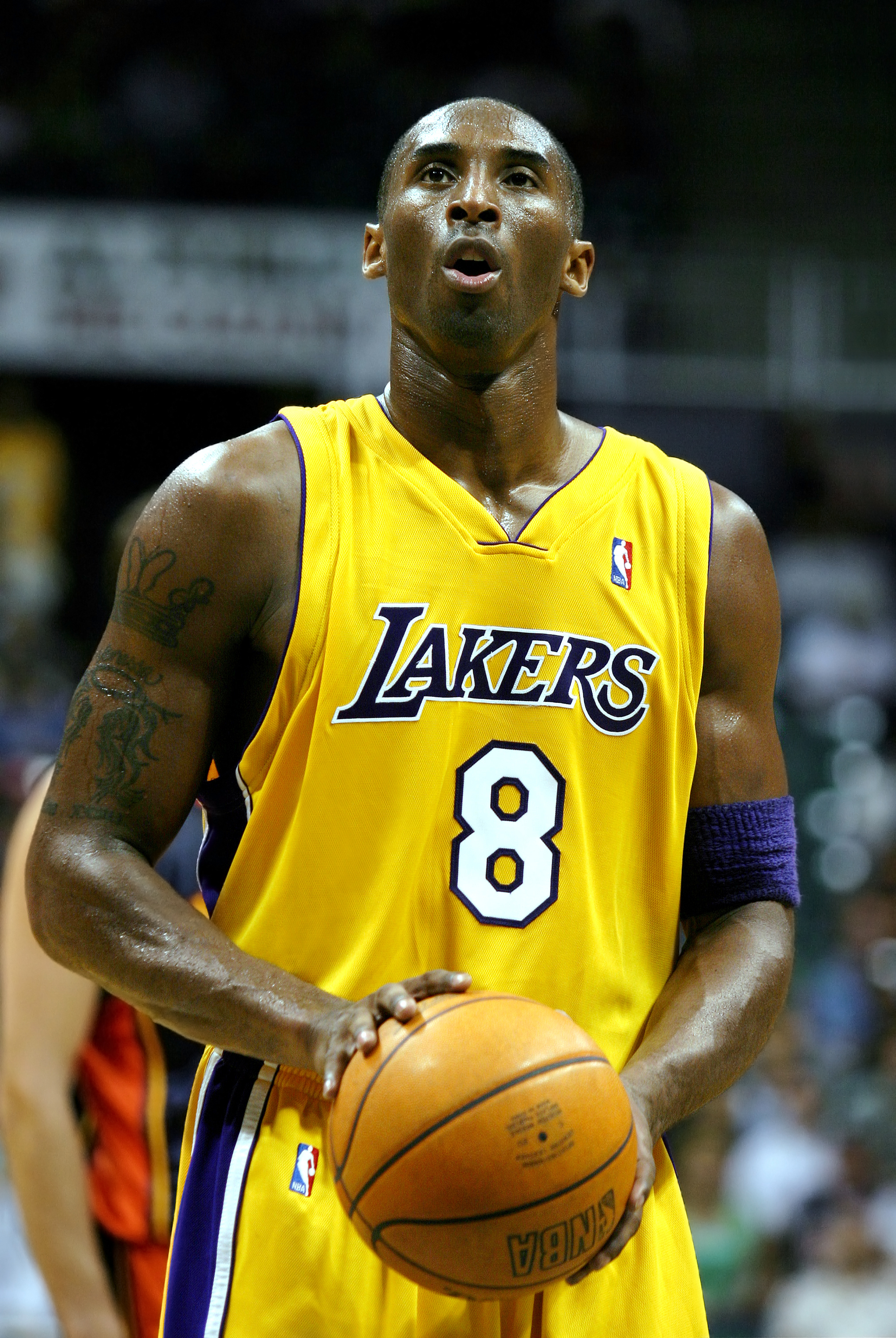
Kobe Bryant excelled on the court through a controversial season.

The Lakers had won three consecutive championships from 2000 to 2002 but lost to the eventual champions, the San Antonio Spurs, in the Western Conference semifinals in 2003 to end their streak at three. The Spurs beat the Lakers in 6 games.

The Lakers and the sporting world was rocked by Kobe Bryant's arrest for sexual assault on July 18 for allegedly raping a 19-year old female hotel employee in Eagle, Colorado. The charges against Bryant were later dismissed in September, but the story was major talking point throughout the season and Bryant's clean-cut public image took a hit. In the 2003 offseason, the Lakers made major changes with initially varying results. Needing to find a point guard and a power forward to defend against Tim Duncan and the Spurs, the Lakers signed veteran stars Gary Payton and Karl Malone for well below market value; they also hoped to give both veterans their first championship ring. The Lakers were afterwards considered the favorites to win the NBA title.

During the regular season, after starting the season 18–3, the Lakers were afflicted by numerous injuries, as well as the ongoing Kobe and Shaq feud, and stumbled to a 56–26 record. On the last day of the season, Bryant hit multiple clutch jump shots, including the game-winning three, against the Portland Trail Blazers to secure the second seed in the Western Conference. This proved pivotal, as it meant they held homecourt advantage of the defending-champion Spurs, the three seed. In addition, despite their feud, Bryant and O'Neal made the 2003–04 First Team All-NBA for the fourth consecutive season.

The Lakers breezed past their first-round opponent, the Houston Rockets, headlining a matchup between Shaquille O'Neal and a young Yao Ming. They defeated the squad 4–1 but then lost the first two games in their series against the Spurs before a dramatic comeback on Derek Fisher's 0.4 shot in Game 5 that saw them win the game and the series, 4–2. They then faced the Minnesota Timberwolves and league MVP Kevin Garnett. The Lakers won the series 4–2 to advance to the Finals.

=== Detroit Pistons ===
The Pistons won two back-to-back championships in 1989 and 1990, but with retirements and departures of several stars, they faded from relevance. The team hired former star Joe Dumars as general manager of the team in 2000, and he began stockpiling draft picks and trading players. He landed defensive stalwart Ben Wallace and guard Richard Hamilton by trading established stars in controversial trades, signed Chauncey Billups who was considered an underachiever, and drafted Tayshaun Prince with the 23rd pick in the 2002 draft. He was named the NBA Executive of the Year in 2003 for returning the Pistons to prominence.

The Pistons made another major—perhaps, riskier—coaching change, firing head coach Rick Carlisle, who had led the Pistons to consecutive Central Division titles, 100 regular season wins, and had received the NBA Coach of the Year Award in 2002. In his place, Dumars hired legendary coach Larry Brown, who had most recently led the Philadelphia 76ers to the NBA Finals in 2001 against the Lakers.

In a three-team trade involving the Boston Celtics and Atlanta Hawks at the trade deadline, Dumars traded Chucky Atkins, Lindsey Hunter, Bobby Sura, Željko Rebrača, and other considerations for guard Mike James and forward Rasheed Wallace, who had been traded from the Portland Trail Blazers to the Hawks and then to the Pistons at the trade deadline. They proved to be the final pieces of the championship team. Lindsey Hunter would rejoin the Pistons a week later after being waived by the Celtics and be partnered with Mike James to create a formidable guard tandem off the bench dubbed "The Pit Bulls". They became the first team in NBA history to hold five consecutive opponents under 70 points, and finished the season with a 54–28 record and the third seed in the Eastern Conference.

The Pistons easily overcame the Milwaukee Bucks 4–1 but struggled against the defending conference champion New Jersey Nets. After splitting the first four games of the series, the Nets won Game 5 in Detroit in triple overtime to take a 3–2 series lead back to New Jersey. After falling behind by 12 early in Game 6, the Pistons stormed back in the second quarter and held on for an 81–75 victory to force a seventh game. The Pistons never trailed after the midway point of the first quarter and cruised to a 90–69 win to take the series.

In the Eastern Conference finals, a match up with the 61-win, Carlisle-led Indiana Pacers, the Pistons faltered in the final 90 seconds of Game 1, falling 78–74. In Game 2, Rasheed Wallace almost squandered a Detroit lead. With Detroit clinging to a 69–67 lead with under 30 seconds to play, Billups recovered the basketball after a Jermaine O'Neal blocked shot of Rasheed Wallace. Jamaal Tinsley stripped Billups and found Reggie Miller open down the court for what appeared to be the tying lay-up. As Miller approached the basket, Tayshaun Prince ran in from the left wing and blocked Miller's lay-up as it left his fingertips. Richard Hamilton recovered the loose ball before it went out of bounds and was fouled by Tinsley. Hamilton would make three free throws in the game's final 15 seconds to seal the victory 72–67 and tie the series. The Pistons rode the momentum of Game 2, including dominant wins in Games 3 and 5, to a 4–2 series victory, advancing to the NBA Finals for the first time in 14 years.

=== Road to the Finals ===
Los Angeles Lakers (Western Conference champion)		Detroit Pistons (Eastern Conference champion)
# / Western Conference; # / Team / W / L / PCT / GB; 1 / c-Minnesota Timberwolves / 58 / 24 / .707 / –; 2 / y-Los Angeles Lakers / 56 / 26 / .683 / 2; 3 / x-San Antonio Spurs / 57 / 25 / .695 / 1; 4 / x-Sacramento Kings / 55 / 27 / .671 / 3; 5 / x-Dallas Mavericks / 52 / 30 / .634 / 6; 6 / x-Memphis Grizzlies / 50 / 32 / .610 / 8; 7 / x-Houston Rockets / 45 / 37 / .549 / 13; 8 / x-Denver Nuggets / 43 / 39 / .524 / 15; 9 / e-Utah Jazz / 42 / 40 / .512 / 16; 10 / e-Portland Trail Blazers / 41 / 41 / .500 / 17; 11 / e-Seattle SuperSonics / 37 / 45 / .451 / 21; 12 / e-Golden State Warriors / 37 / 45 / .451 / 21; 13 / e-Phoenix Suns / 29 / 53 / .354 / 29; 14 / e-Los Angeles Clippers / 28 / 54 / .341 / 30; 2nd seed in the West, 4th best league record	Regular season	# / Eastern Conference; # / Team / W / L / PCT / GB; 1 / z-Indiana Pacers / 61 / 21 / .744 / –; 2 / y-New Jersey Nets / 47 / 35 / .573 / 14; 3 / x-Detroit Pistons / 54 / 28 / .659 / 7; 4 / x-Miami Heat / 42 / 40 / .512 / 19; 5 / x-New Orleans Hornets / 41 / 41 / .500 / 20; 6 / x-Milwaukee Bucks / 41 / 41 / .500 / 20; 7 / x-New York Knicks / 39 / 43 / .476 / 22; 8 / x-Boston Celtics / 36 / 46 / .439 / 25; 9 / e-Cleveland Cavaliers / 35 / 47 / .427 / 26; 10 / e-Toronto Raptors / 33 / 49 / .402 / 28; 11 / e-Philadelphia 76ers / 33 / 49 / .402 / 28; 12 / e-Atlanta Hawks / 28 / 54 / .341 / 33; 13 / e-Washington Wizards / 25 / 57 / .305 / 36; 14 / e-Chicago Bulls / 23 / 59 / .280 / 38; 15 / e-Orlando Magic / 21 / 61 / .256 / 40; 3rd seed in the East, 6th best league record
Defeated the (7) Houston Rockets, 4–1	First round	Defeated the (6) Milwaukee Bucks, 4–1
Defeated the (3) San Antonio Spurs, 4–2	Conference semifinals	Defeated the (2) New Jersey Nets, 4–3
Defeated the (1) Minnesota Timberwolves, 4–2	Conference finals	Defeated the (1) Indiana Pacers, 4–2

=== Regular season series ===
The teams split the two meetings, each won by the home team:

November 14, 2003

Detroit Pistons 89, Los Angeles Lakers 94

Staples Center, Los Angeles, California

November 18, 2003

Los Angeles Lakers 96, Detroit Pistons 106

The Palace of Auburn Hills, Auburn Hills, Michigan

== Team rosters ==
=== Detroit Pistons ===
2003–04 Detroit Pistons roster
Players

Pos.	No.	Player	Height	Weight	DOB	From
G	1	Chauncey Billups	6 ft 3 in (1.91 m)	202 lb (92 kg)	1976–09–25	Colorado
C	41	Elden Campbell	6 ft 11 in (2.11 m)	279 lb (127 kg)	1968–07–23	Clemson
F	24	Tremaine Fowlkes	6 ft 7 in (2.01 m)	212 lb (96 kg)	1976–04–11	Fresno State
F	8	Darvin Ham	6 ft 7 in (2.01 m)	240 lb (109 kg)	1973–07–23	Texas Tech
G/F	32	Richard Hamilton	6 ft 7 in (2.01 m)	193 lb (88 kg)	1978–02–14	Connecticut
G	10	Lindsey Hunter	6 ft 2 in (1.88 m)	195 lb (88 kg)	1970–12–03	Jackson State
G	7	Mike James	6 ft 2 in (1.88 m)	188 lb (85 kg)	1975–06–23	Duquesne
C	31	Darko Miličić	7 ft 0 in (2.13 m)	275 lb (125 kg)	1985–06–20	Serbia and Montenegro
F/C	13	Mehmet Okur	6 ft 11 in (2.11 m)	290 lb (132 kg)	1979–05–26	Turkey
F	22	Tayshaun Prince	6 ft 9 in (2.06 m)	215 lb (98 kg)	1980–02–28	Kentucky
F/C	3	Ben Wallace	6 ft 9 in (2.06 m)	245 lb (111 kg)	1974–09–10	Virginia Union
F/C	30	Rasheed Wallace	6 ft 11 in (2.11 m)	230 lb (104 kg)	1974–09–17	North Carolina
F	34	Corliss Williamson	6 ft 7 in (2.01 m)	245 lb (111 kg)	1973–12–04	Arkansas

Coaches
Head coach
- Larry Brown
Assistant(s)
- Herb Brown
- Dave Hanners
- Igor Kokoškov
- John Kuester
- Mike Woodson

Legend
- (DP) Unsigned draft pick
- (FA) Free agent
- (S) Suspended
- Injured

Roster
Updated: February 26, 2004

=== Los Angeles Lakers ===
2003–04 Los Angeles Lakers roster
Players

Pos.	No.	Player	Height	Weight	DOB	From
G	8	Kobe Bryant	6 ft 6 in (1.98 m)	205 lb (93 kg)	1978–08–23	Lower Merion HS (PA)
F	7	Brian Cook	6 ft 9 in (2.06 m)	234 lb (106 kg)	1980–12–04	Illinois
G	2	Derek Fisher	6 ft 1 in (1.85 m)	210 lb (95 kg)	1974–08–09	Little Rock
F	17	Rick Fox	6 ft 7 in (2.01 m)	230 lb (104 kg)	1969–07–24	North Carolina
F	3	Devean George	6 ft 8 in (2.03 m)	235 lb (107 kg)	1977–08–29	Augsburg
F/C	54	Horace Grant	6 ft 10 in (2.08 m)	245 lb (111 kg)	1965–07–04	Clemson
F	11	Karl Malone	6 ft 9 in (2.06 m)	250 lb (113 kg)	1963–07–24	Louisiana Tech
F	14	Slava Medvedenko	6 ft 10 in (2.08 m)	253 lb (115 kg)	1979–04–04	Ukraine
C	34	Shaquille O'Neal	7 ft 1 in (2.16 m)	325 lb (147 kg)	1972–03–06	LSU
G	20	Gary Payton	6 ft 4 in (1.93 m)	180 lb (82 kg)	1968–07–23	Oregon State
G	21	Kareem Rush	6 ft 5 in (1.96 m)	200 lb (91 kg)	1980–10–30	Missouri
F	9	Bryon Russell	6 ft 7 in (2.01 m)	225 lb (102 kg)	1970–12–31	Long Beach State
C	31	Jamal Sampson	6 ft 11 in (2.11 m)	235 lb (107 kg)	1983–05–15	California
F	4	Luke Walton	6 ft 8 in (2.03 m)	235 lb (107 kg)	1980–03–28	Arizona

Coaches
Head coach
- Phil Jackson
Assistant(s)
- Jim Cleamons
- Frank Hamblen
- Kurt Rambis
- Tex Winter

Legend
- (DP) Unsigned draft pick
- (FA) Free agent
- (S) Suspended
- Injured

Roster
Updated: February 19, 2004

== Series summary ==
Game	Date	Away team	Result	Home team
Game 1	June 6	Detroit Pistons	87–75 (1–0)	Los Angeles Lakers
Game 2	June 8	Detroit Pistons	91–99 (OT) (1–1)	Los Angeles Lakers
Game 3	June 10	Los Angeles Lakers	68–88 (1–2)	Detroit Pistons
Game 4	June 13	Los Angeles Lakers	80–88 (1–3)	Detroit Pistons
Game 5	June 15	Los Angeles Lakers	87–100 (1–4)	Detroit Pistons

The Finals were played using a 2–3–2 site format, where the first two and last two games are held at the team with home court advantage. This format was only used in the Finals; all other playoff series were held in a 2–2–1–1–1 format (the team with home court advantage starts).

The Pistons became the fourth team to sweep the middle three games since the NBA started using the 2–3–2 format in 1985, but the first to do so at home; the previous three times this had occurred, it was done by away teams (1989–90 Pistons, 1990–91 Chicago Bulls, 2000–01 Lakers). This feat would later be accomplished by two more teams (the 2005–06 and 2011–12 Miami Heat, both on their home floor) before the Finals reverted to 2–2–1–1–1 format in 2014.

This was the first Finals series to be played on a Sunday–Tuesday–Thursday rotation since 1990, the last year CBS had the NBA's national television contract. NBC switched to a Wednesday-Friday-Sunday rotation in 1991, which was used through 2003, save for Monday games in 1999 and 2000 (and a potential Tuesday game in 1999, had that Finals reached Game 7). It is also the last series to have Game 1 be played on a Sunday. Since 2005, Game 1 has been played on a Thursday each year, with the exceptions of 2011, 2012, 2020, and 2021.

=== Features ===
The NBA heavily publicized the series as it has done with all other NBA Finals series. There was a sentiment among fans that the Pistons were the clear underdogs, and many described the series as a David vs. Goliath match-up. The Lakers had a lineup of Stars such as Karl Malone, Gary Payton, Kobe Bryant, and Shaquille O'Neal—their offensive capability was expected to overpower Detroit's defensive-based game plan.

Payton and Malone also added to the publicity of the Finals. Perennial All-Stars who had both previously reached the Finals, Payton had led the Seattle SuperSonics there in 1996, while Malone had led the Utah Jazz there in 1997 and 1998. However, the Michael Jordan-led Chicago Bulls denied them championship rings a total of three times. By the time of Jordan's second retirement in 1998, the two veterans were aged and failed to lead their teams deep into the playoffs. It would be Malone's final chance to win a championship, as he would retire before the subsequent season.

== Game summaries ==
All times are in Eastern Daylight Time (UTC−4). If the venue is located in a different time zone, the local time is also given.

=== Game 1 ===
ABC

June 6
9:00 pm (6:00 pm PDT)

Recap at the Wayback Machine (archived March 21, 2010)

Detroit Pistons 87, Los Angeles Lakers 75
Scoring by quarter: 22–19, 18–22, 24–17, 23–17
Pts: Chauncey Billups 22; Rebs: B. Wallace, R. Wallace 8 each Asts: Richard Hamilton 5	Pts: Shaquille O'Neal 34; Rebs: Malone, O'Neal 11 each Asts: Kobe Bryant 4
Detroit leads series, 1–0

Staples Center, Los Angeles, California
Attendance: 18,997
Referees:
- No. 17 Joe Crawford
- No. 26 Bob Delaney
- No. 7 Bernie Fryer

Considered to be a stunning upset by most of the NBA world, the Detroit Pistons managed to defeat the Lakers with an imposing defense. Clamping down on everyone but Bryant and O'Neal, the Pistons managed to hold everyone else to a total of 16 points. O'Neal recorded 34 points and 11 rebounds for the Lakers.

The Pistons trailed the Lakers 41–40 at halftime, but by the fourth quarter the Pistons had opened up a 13-point lead; they would not trail for the rest of the game. The Pistons outscored the Lakers 47 to 34 in the 2nd half as they got the road win in Los Angeles. Chauncey Billups recorded 22 points, 4 assists, and 3 steals to fuel his team towards the win.

=== Game 2 ===
ABC

June 8
9:00 pm (6:00 pm PDT)

Recap at the Wayback Machine (archived March 21, 2010)

Detroit Pistons 91, Los Angeles Lakers 99 (OT)
Scoring by quarter: 16–18, 20–26, 30–24, 23–21, Overtime: 2–10
Pts: Chauncey Billups 27; Rebs: Ben Wallace 14; Asts: Chauncey Billups 9	Pts: Kobe Bryant 33; Rebs: Karl Malone 9 Asts: Luke Walton 8
Series tied, 1–1

Staples Center, Los Angeles, California
Attendance: 18,997
Referees:
- No. 15 Bennett Salvatore
- No. 14 Joe DeRosa
- No. 29 Steve Javie

In Game 2, the Lakers had an 7-point lead at halftime, 43–36. However, in the third quarter, the Pistons scored 30 points, cutting the deficit to 68–66. Detroit took the lead on a Lindsey Hunter three-pointer, 71–68. However, the Lakers went on a 7–0 run to regain the lead with 7:00 remaining in the fourth quarter. With 47 seconds remaining, Ben Wallace made a putback to give the Pistons a 6-point advantage. The next play, Kobe Bryant missed a 3-pointer but O'Neal was there to grab the offensive board and made an and-1 to cut the deficit to 3. The Pistons led by three points with 10.9 seconds remaining in the final period. Coach Brown wanted to foul a Lakers player where they could get only 2 points rather than 3. However, the Pistons' veterans only wanted to intentionally foul O'Neal. Kobe Bryant's 3-point shot with 2.1 seconds left in the fourth quarter would force overtime, where the Pistons would make only one two-point field goal (compared to Los Angeles scoring ten points). Afterwards, on the team bus back to the airport, Billups told the Pistons' players and coaches, "We're not coming back to L.A."

=== Game 3 ===
ABC

June 10
9:00 pm

Recap at the Wayback Machine (archived March 21, 2010)

Los Angeles Lakers 68, Detroit Pistons 88
Scoring by quarter: 16–24, 16–15, 19–24, 17–25
Pts: Shaquille O'Neal 14; Rebs: Medvedenko, O'Neal 8 each Asts: Gary Payton 7	Pts: Richard Hamilton 31; Rebs: Ben Wallace 11; Asts: Billups, Hamilton, B. Wallace 3 each
Detroit leads series, 2–1

The Palace of Auburn Hills, Auburn Hills, Michigan
Referees:
- No. 10 Ron Garretson
- No. 43 Dan Crawford
- No. 24 Mike Callahan

In Game 3, the Pistons were on fire to start. They started the game on a 10–2 run. At halftime, the Pistons led by seven, 39–32. The Pistons beat Los Angeles by 20 in their first NBA Finals appearance together at The Palace of Auburn Hills since 1989 to take a 2–1 lead in the series. The 68 points scored by the Lakers set a franchise record for the lowest number of points scored in a playoff game. Tayshaun Prince and the Pistons' defense were able to hold Kobe Bryant to 11 points on 4/13 (.308%) shooting, with Bryant going scoreless in the first half.

=== Game 4 ===
ABC

June 13
9:00 pm

Recap at the Wayback Machine (archived March 21, 2010)

Los Angeles Lakers 80, Detroit Pistons 88
Scoring by quarter: 22–21, 17–20, 17–15, 24–32
Pts: Shaquille O'Neal 36; Rebs: Shaquille O'Neal 20; Asts: Rick Fox 6	Pts: Rasheed Wallace 26; Rebs: B. Wallace, R. Wallace 13 each Asts: Richard Hamilton 6
Detroit leads series, 3–1

The Palace of Auburn Hills, Auburn Hills, Michigan
Referees:
- No. 35 Jack Nies
- No. 27 Dick Bavetta
- No. 32 Eddie F. Rush

Again, the Pistons defeated the Lakers, although this time by eight, to take a 3–1 series advantage.

O'Neal scored 36 for the Lakers and Bryant scored 20 but shot 32 percent from the field.

Karl Malone would play his last game, as a knee injury would not allow him to dress in Game 5.

=== Game 5 ===
ABC

June 15
9:00 pm

Recap at the Wayback Machine (archived March 21, 2010)

Los Angeles Lakers 87, Detroit Pistons 100
Scoring by quarter: 24–25, 21–30, 14–27, 28–18
Pts: Kobe Bryant 24; Rebs: Shaquille O'Neal 8 Asts: Luke Walton 5	Pts: Richard Hamilton 21; Rebs: Ben Wallace 22; Asts: Chauncey Billups 6
Detroit wins NBA Finals, 4–1

The Palace of Auburn Hills, Auburn Hills, Michigan
Referees:
- No. 17 Joe Crawford
- No. 7 Bernie Fryer
- No. 15 Bennett Salvatore

In Game 5, the Pistons won their first championship since 1990, and Larry Brown finally won a professional title. The Pistons defense had overcome the high-scoring Laker offense, winning the game by 13, winning the series 4–1, and also ending a long Laker dynasty that lasted for many years. The Pistons' 100 points was the first (and only) time either team scored triple digits in the series. The game saw the end of Phil Jackson's first run as the coach—he returned in the 2005–06 season—and saw O'Neal, Payton, and Malone's last games in Laker uniforms.

The series was also Karl Malone's last NBA Finals appearance. He holds an NBA record for having played the most playoff games without winning a championship (193).

== Player statistics ==
Legend
GP	Games played	GS	Games started	MPG	Minutes per game
FG%	Field-goal percentage	3P%	3-point field-goal percentage	FT%	Free-throw percentage
RPG	Rebounds per game	APG	Assists per game	SPG	Steals per game
BPG	Blocks per game	PPG	Points per game

Detroit Pistons

Detroit Pistons statistics
Player	GP	GS	MPG	FG%	3P%	FT%	RPG	APG	SPG	BPG	PPG
Chauncey Billups	5	5	38.4	.509	.471	.929	3.2	5.2	1.2	0.0	21.0
Elden Campbell	5	0	13.6	.375	.000	.500	2.6	1.6	1.0	0.6	3.4
Darvin Ham	4	0	2.5	1.000	.000	.000	0.3	0.0	0.0	0.0	0.5
Richard Hamilton	5	5	44.4	.402	.400	.853	5.2	4.0	0.8	0.0	21.4
Lindsey Hunter	5	0	13.0	.294	.250	1.000	1.4	0.8	0.6	0.4	3.6
Mike James	5	0	4.4	.500	.000	.000	0.8	0.8	0.0	0.0	0.8
Darko Miličić	3	0	1.7	.000	.000	.000	0.7	0.0	0.3	0.0	0.0
Mehmet Okur	4	0	9.8	.444	1.000	.500	1.5	0.5	0.0	0.0	2.8
Tayshaun Prince	5	5	39.2	.389	.188	.455	6.8	2.0	1.8	0.4	10.0
Ben Wallace	5	5	40.6	.478	.000	.294	13.6	1.4	1.8	1.0	10.8
Rasheed Wallace	5	5	30.2	.453	.250	.778	7.8	1.4	0.4	1.6	13.0
Corliss Williamson	5	0	10.4	.400	.000	.900	2.4	0.2	0.0	0.0	4.2

Los Angeles Lakers

Los Angeles Lakers statistics
Player	GP	GS	MPG	FG%	3P%	FT%	RPG	APG	SPG	BPG	PPG
Kobe Bryant	5	5	46.2	.381	.174	.920	2.8	4.4	1.8	0.6	22.6
Brian Cook	3	0	7.0	.167	.000	1.000	2.7	0.0	0.3	0.0	1.3
Derek Fisher	5	0	20.2	.306	.375	.571	3.0	1.8	1.0	0.0	6.4
Rick Fox	3	0	10.0	.571	.000	.000	1.0	2.3	0.0	0.0	2.7
Devean George	5	5	20.8	.393	.333	0.5	2.8	0.6	1.0	0.4	5.8
Karl Malone	4	4	30.5	.333	.000	.667	7.3	2.3	0.3	0.3	5.0
Slava Medvedenko	5	1	14.4	.353	.000	.750	3.6	0.6	0.0	0.2	3.6
Shaquille O'Neal	5	5	42.6	.631	.000	.491	10.8	1.6	0.4	0.6	26.6
Gary Payton	5	5	33.6	.321	.200	.500	3.0	4.4	1.2	0.4	4.2
Kareem Rush	5	0	15.6	.318	.250	.000	1.0	0.4	0.2	0.0	3.6
Bryon Russell	3	0	2.7	.000	.000	.000	0.3	0.0	0.0	0.0	0.0
Luke Walton	4	0	19.3	.385	.167	1.000	3.0	4.5	1.5	0.5	3.3

== Broadcast notes ==
The games were broadcast on ABC by Al Michaels and Doc Rivers. This was the first of two NBA Finals assignments for Michaels, better known as the voice of Monday Night Football at the time, while Rivers departed the booth after the series to become head coach of the Boston Celtics. Rivers was replaced by Hubie Brown the following season. Rivers would not return to the broadcast booth until 2023, where he and Doris Burke replaced Mark Jackson and Jeff Van Gundy on the lead broadcast team alongside Mike Breen; Jackson and Van Gundy were laid off by the network after the 2023 NBA Finals. However, Rivers' second stint in the booth only lasted until January 2024 when the Milwaukee Bucks hired him as head coach.

Brent Musburger and Jack Ramsay broadcast the Finals nationally on ESPN Radio. The finals were shown on Sky Sports in the United Kingdom and Ireland. In Canada, Leafs TV and RDS (in French) simulcast ABC, and Azteca 13 broadcast the Finals in Mexico. The local ABC stations for the competing cities were WXYZ-TV in Detroit and KABC-TV in Los Angeles.

To promote the series, the NBA used The Black Eyed Peas' song "Let's Get It Started", which it had also used throughout the 2004 NBA playoffs.

== Aftermath ==
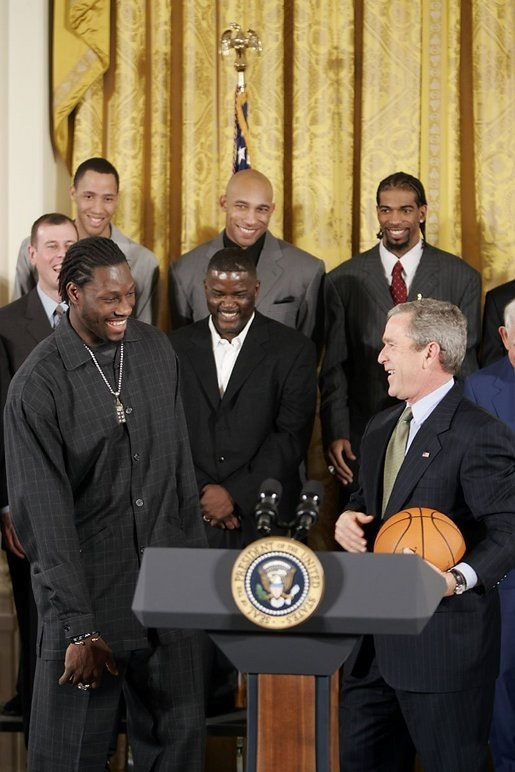
Ben Wallace and the Pistons with President George W. Bush

The Pistons won 54 games the following season, earning the second seed in the Eastern Conference. They returned to the NBA Finals, where they lost to the San Antonio Spurs in seven games. The Pistons would continue their run of Eastern Conference superiority in the ensuing three years; losing in the Conference finals each time. After a particularly painful loss to the eventual champion Boston Celtics in the 2007–08 season, management would finally break up the core of the team and enter a period of losing seasons.

The Lakers' collapse became apparent in the days following the Finals. Head coach Phil Jackson abruptly resigned, Shaquille O'Neal was traded to the Miami Heat, where he eventually won a championship in 2006; Gary Payton was dealt to the Celtics, and Karl Malone was left unsigned, which subsequently resulted in Malone's retirement following the start of 2004–05 NBA season. Players from the three-peat era that left the team were Rick Fox, who retired, and Derek Fisher, who signed a lucrative free-agent contract with the Golden State Warriors. The 2004–05 season was a tough one for the Lakers as they won just 34 games and missed the playoffs. Jackson returned to the Lakers in the following offseason; despite penning a book dubiously entitled: The Last Season: A Team in Search of Its Soul, in which he voiced disdain for Kobe Bryant; calling him 'uncoachable'. Jackson and Bryant would quickly bury the hatchet once the season began; the duo, in the ensuing years would appear in three more NBA Finals in 2008, 2009, and 2010, winning the latter two.

This was the third "Big Four" postseason series in five years involving teams from Detroit and Los Angeles, as the Detroit Red Wings and Los Angeles Kings of the National Hockey League previously faced off in the 2000 and 2001 Stanley Cup playoffs. The next postseason matchup involving both cities would not come until the 2023 NFC Wild Card Round between the Detroit Lions and the Los Angeles Rams of the National Football League.

With the Detroit Shock previously defeating the Los Angeles Sparks to win the 2003 WNBA Finals, this marked the second time a city concurrently held the WNBA and NBA championships within a fiscal year, after the Sparks in 2001 and 2002 followed the Lakers' NBA title wins. It also marked the only occurrence in which the same two cities faced each other in both the WNBA and NBA Finals within the same period.
