= List of Boston Celtics head coaches =

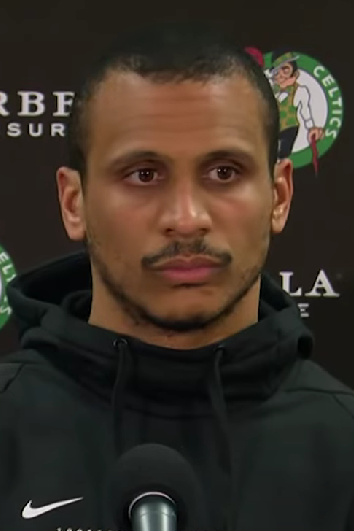
Joe Mazzulla is the current head coach of the Celtics.

The Boston Celtics are an American professional basketball team based in Boston. They play in the Atlantic Division of the Eastern Conference in the National Basketball Association (NBA). The team is owned by Bill Chisolm with Brad Stevens as the general manager. Founded in 1946, their 18 NBA championships are the most for any NBA franchise. Their eight consecutive NBA championships from 1959 to 1966 represent the longest consecutive championship winning streak of any major professional sports leagues in the United States and Canada to date. They play their home games in the TD Garden.

There have been 18 head coaches for the Boston Celtics franchise. The Celtics won their first NBA championship in the 1957 NBA Finals under the coaching of Red Auerbach. Auerbach is the franchise's all-time leader in the number of regular-season and playoff wins as a coach. Auerbach and Bill Fitch were included in the Top 10 Coaches in NBA history. Fitch was the 1979–80 NBA Coach of the Year and also led the Celtics to a championship in 1981. Auerbach led the Celtics to nine championships, in 1957, 1959, 1960, 1961, 1962, 1963, 1964, 1965, and 1966. He was also the 1965–66 Coach of the Year. K.C. Jones led the Celtics to two championships, in 1984 and 1986. Alvin Julian, Auerbach, Tom Heinsohn, Fitch and Rick Pitino have earned induction into the Basketball Hall of Fame as coaches.

Bill Russell, Tom Heinsohn, Tom Sanders, Dave Cowens, K.C. Jones, Chris Ford and M. L. Carr have played and coached for the Celtics. John Russell, Alvin Julian, Heinsohn, Sanders, Carr, and John Carroll spent their entire coaching career with the Celtics. Doc Rivers, led the team to one NBA championship.

== Key ==
GC	Games coached
W	Wins
L	Losses
Win%	Winning percentage
#	Number of coaches^{[a]}
*	Spent entire NBA head coaching career with the Celtics
†	Elected into the Basketball Hall of Fame as a coach
*†	Elected to the Basketball Hall of Fame as a coach and spent entire coaching career with the Celtics

== Coaches ==
Note: Statistics are correct through the end of the 2025–26 season.

#	Name	Term^{[b]}	GC	W	L	Win%	GC	W	L	Win%	Achievements	Reference
#	Name	Term^{[b]}	Regular season				Playoffs				Achievements	Reference
1	John Russell*	1946–1948	108	42	66	.389	3	1	2	.333		
2	Alvin Julian*†	1948–1950	128	47	81	.367	—	—	—	—		
3	Red Auerbach†	1950–1966	1192	795	397	.669	148	90	58	.608	9 championships (1957, 1959, 1960, 1961, 1962, 1963, 1964, 1965, 1966); 1964–65 NBA Coach of the Year; One of the top 10 coaches in NBA history	
4	Bill Russell†	1966–1969 (as player-coach)	245	162	83	.661	18	12	6	.667	2 championships (1968, 1969)	
5	Tom Heinsohn*†	1969–1978	690	427	263	.619	80	47	33	.588	1972–73 NBA Coach of the Year; 2 championships (1974, 1976)	
6	Tom Sanders*	1978	62	23	39	.371	—	—	—	—		
7	Dave Cowens	1978–1979 (as player-coach)	68	27	41	.397	—	—	—	—		
8	Bill Fitch†	1979–1983	328	242	86	.738	45	26	19	.578	1 championship (1981); 1979–80 NBA Coach of the year One of the top 10 coaches in NBA history	
9	K.C. Jones	1983–1988	410	308	102	.751	102	65	37	.637	2 championships (1984, 1986)	
10	Jimmy Rodgers	1988–1990	164	94	70	.573	8	2	6	.250		
11	Chris Ford	1990–1995	410	222	188	.541	29	13	16	.448		
12	M. L. Carr*	1995–1997	164	48	116	.293	—	—	—	—		
13	Rick Pitino†	1997–2001	248	102	146	.411	—	—	—	—		
14	Jim O'Brien	2001–2004	258	139	119	.539	26	13	13	.500		
15	John Carroll*	2004	36	14	22	.389	4	0	4	.000		
16	Doc Rivers†	2004–2013	721	416	305	.577	104	58	46	.558	1 championship (2008)	
17	Brad Stevens*	2013–2021	636	354	282	.557	78	38	40	.487		
18	Ime Udoka	2021–2022	82	51	31	.622	24	14	10	.583		
19	Joe Mazzulla*	2022–present	328	238	90	.726	57	36	21	.632	1 championship (2024); 2025–26 NBA Coach of the year	

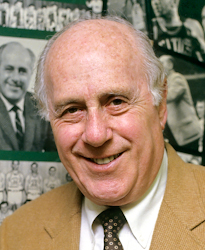
Red Auerbach led the franchise to 9 NBA championships in 16 seasons.

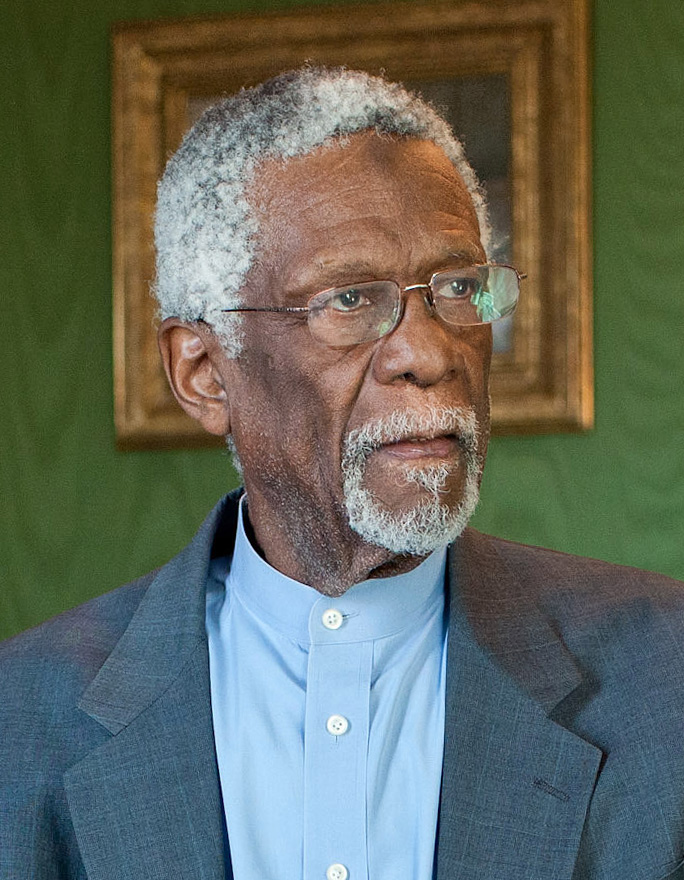
Bill Russell was the coach for the Celtics when they won the Back to back NBA championship in 1968 and 1969.

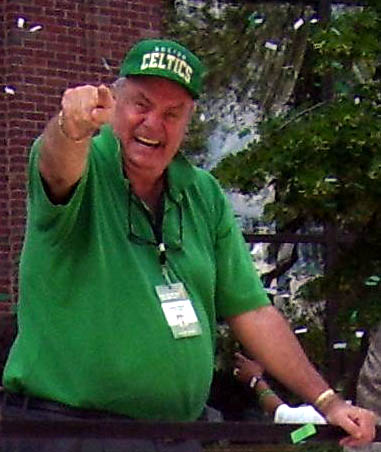
Tom Heinsohn was named NBA Coach of the Year in 1972–73 and won the NBA championship in 1974 and 1976.

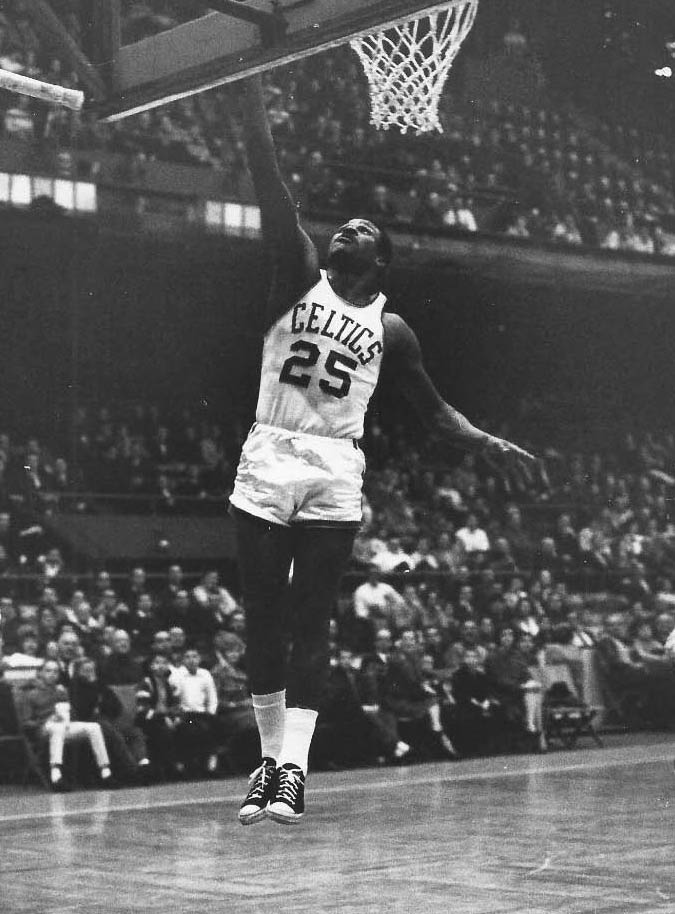
K.C. Jones was the coach for the Celtics when they won the NBA championship in 1984 and 1986.

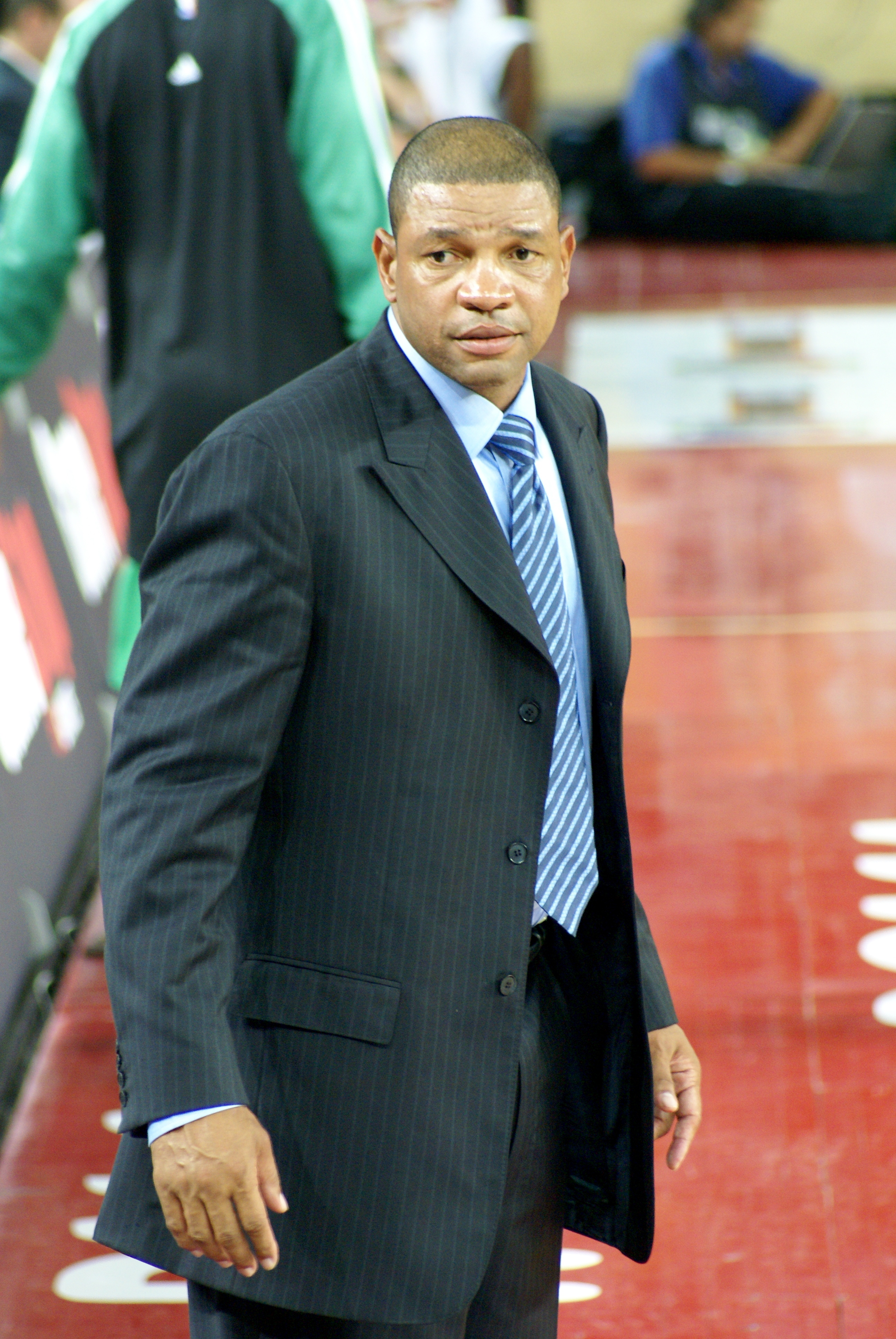
Former head coach Doc Rivers led the team to the NBA championship in 2008.

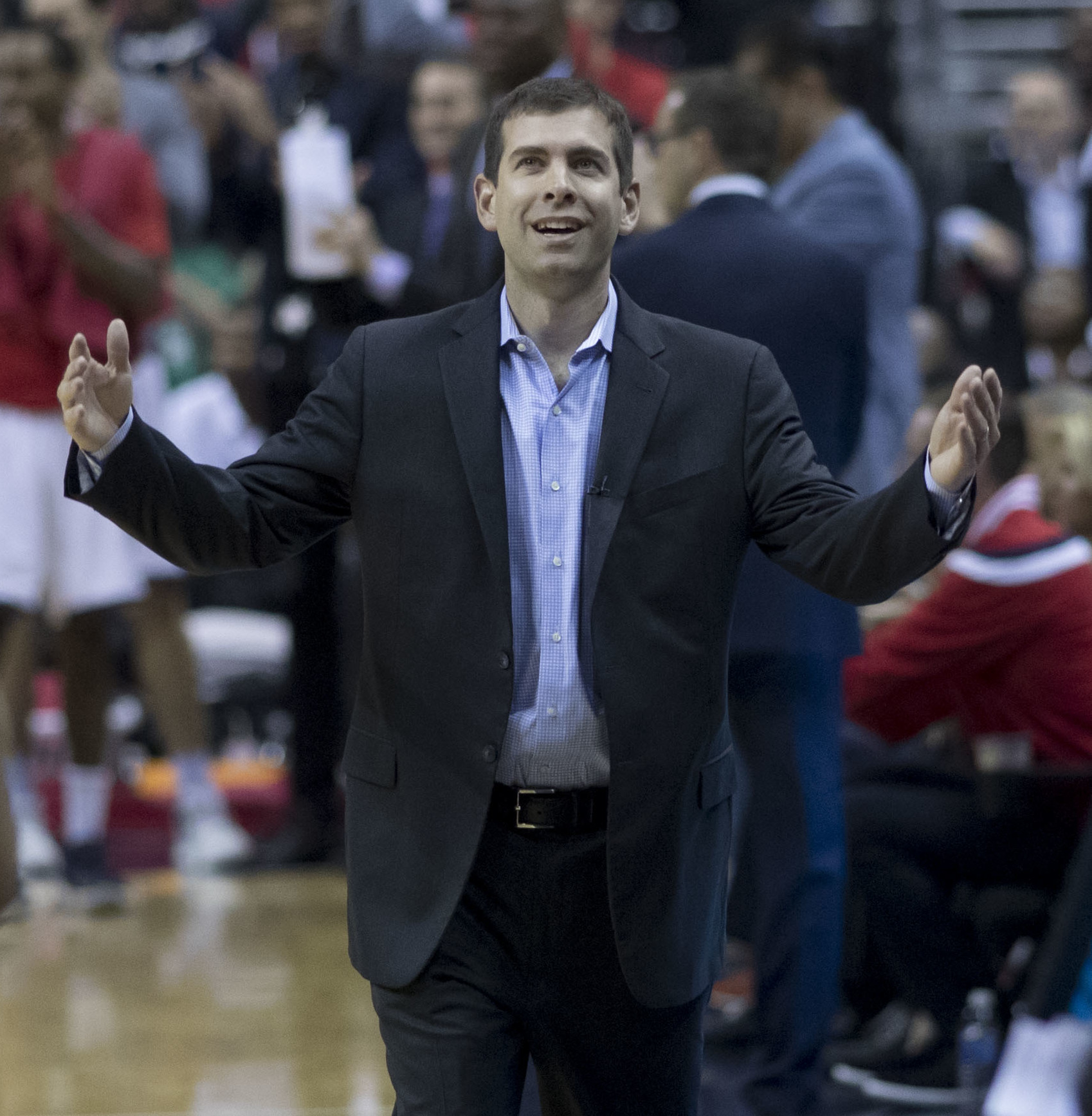
Brad Stevens was the Celtics' head coach from 2013 to 2021.

== Notes ==
- ^{a} A running total of the number of coaches of the Celtics. Thus, any coach who has two or more separate terms as head coach is only counted once.
- ^{b} Each year is linked to an article about that particular Celtics season.
