= 2004–05 Boston Celtics season =

Season of National Basketball Association team the Boston Celtics

- Division champions
- Head coach: Doc Rivers
- General manager: Chris Wallace
- Owners: Boston Basketball Partners
- Arena: Fleet Center

Results
- Record: 45–37 (.549)
- Place: Division: 1st (Atlantic); Conference: 3rd (Eastern)
- Playoff finish: First Round (lost to Pacers 3–4)
- Stats at Basketball Reference

Local media
- Television: FSN New England
- Radio: WWZN

The 2004–05 Boston Celtics season was the 59th season for the Boston Celtics in the National Basketball Association. The team hired Doc Rivers to be their head coach for the upcoming season. During the offseason, the Celtics acquired All-Star guard Gary Payton, and former Celtics forward Rick Fox from the Los Angeles Lakers, but Fox would retire before the season. The Celtics struggled playing under .500 for the first half of the season. At midseason, Payton was traded to the Atlanta Hawks for former Celtic All-Star forward Antoine Walker. However, Payton would never suit up for the Hawks and was released shortly after. He then re-signed with the Celtics afterwards for the remainder of the season. The team went on a 7-game winning streak in March, finishing first place in the Atlantic Division with a 45–37 record. Paul Pierce was selected for the 2005 NBA All-Star Game.

Despite their mediocre record, the Celtics earned the #3 seed in the Eastern Conference. In the playoffs, they lost to the 6th-seeded Indiana Pacers in a seven-game first round series. Boston did not return to the playoffs until 2008 en route to the championship. Following the season, Walker was traded to the Miami Heat, while Payton went along with him signing as a free agent. The Heat went on to win the championship the following season.

== Draft picks ==
Round	Pick	Player	Position	Nationality	College/School
1	15	Al Jefferson	PF	United States	Prentiss HS (MS)
1	24	Delonte West	SG/PG	United States	Saint Joseph's
1	25	Tony Allen	SG	United States	Oklahoma State
2	40	Justin Reed	SF	United States	Ole Miss

== Roster ==
2004–05 Boston Celtics roster
Players

Pos.	No.	Player	Height	Weight	DOB	From
SG	42	Tony Allen	6 ft 4 in (1.93 m)	213 lb (97 kg)	1982–01–11	Oklahoma State
PG	11	Marcus Banks	6 ft 2 in (1.88 m)	205 lb (93 kg)	1981–11–19	UNLV
C	30	Mark Blount	7 ft 0 in (2.13 m)	250 lb (113 kg)	1975–11–30	Pittsburgh
G/F	12	Ricky Davis	6 ft 7 in (2.01 m)	195 lb (88 kg)	1979–09–23	Iowa
PF	8	Al Jefferson	6 ft 10 in (2.08 m)	256 lb (116 kg)	1985–01–04	Prentiss HS (MS)
PF	45	Raef LaFrentz	6 ft 11 in (2.11 m)	245 lb (111 kg)	1976–05–29	Kansas
PG	20	Gary Payton	6 ft 4 in (1.93 m)	180 lb (82 kg)	1968–07–23	Oregon State
C	43	Kendrick Perkins	6 ft 10 in (2.08 m)	280 lb (127 kg)	1984–11–10	Clifton J. Ozen HS (TX)
SF	34	Paul Pierce	6 ft 6 in (1.98 m)	230 lb (104 kg)	1977–10–13	Kansas
F	9	Justin Reed	6 ft 8 in (2.03 m)	240 lb (109 kg)	1982–01–16	Mississippi
PF	88	Antoine Walker	6 ft 9 in (2.06 m)	265 lb (120 kg)	1976–08–12	Kentucky
SG	13	Delonte West	6 ft 4 in (1.93 m)	180 lb (82 kg)	1983–07–26	Saint Joseph's

Coaches
Head coach
- Doc Rivers
Assistant(s)
- Jim Brewer
- Tony Brown
- Kevin Eastman
- Armond Hill
- Paul Pressey
- Dave Wohl

Legend
- (DP) Unsigned draft pick
- (FA) Free agent
- (S) Suspended
- Injured

Roster
Updated: 2005–02–24

== Regular season ==
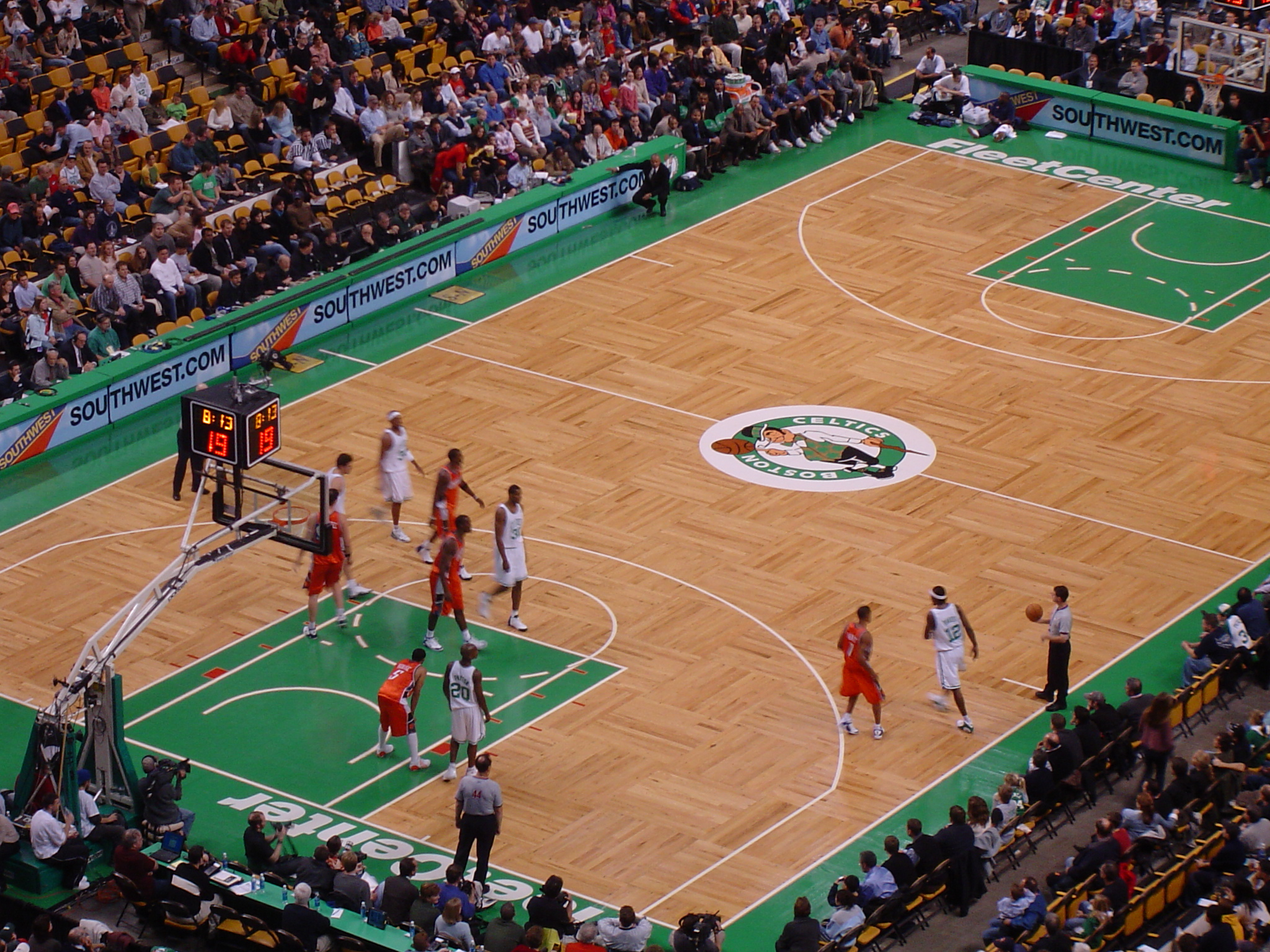
A regular season game at home against the Charlotte Bobcats on November 12, 2004.

=== Standings ===
Atlantic Division	W	L	PCT	GB	Home	Road	Div
y-Boston Celtics	45	37	.549	–	27–14	18–23	8–8
x-Philadelphia 76ers	43	39	.524	2	25–16	18–23	8–8
x-New Jersey Nets	42	40	.512	3	24–17	18–23	11–5
e-New York Knicks	33	49	.402	12	22–19	11–30	6–10
e-Toronto Raptors	33	49	.402	12	22–19	11–30	7–9

Eastern Conference
#	Team	W	L	PCT	GB
1	c-Miami Heat	59	23	.720	–
2	y-Detroit Pistons	54	28	.659	5
3	y-Boston Celtics	45	37	.549	14
4	x-Chicago Bulls	47	35	.573	12
5	x-Washington Wizards	45	37	.549	14
6	x-Indiana Pacers	44	38	.537	15
7	x-Philadelphia 76ers	43	39	.524	16
8	x-New Jersey Nets	42	40	.512	17
9	e-Cleveland Cavaliers	42	40	.512	17
10	e-Orlando Magic	36	46	.439	23
11	e-New York Knicks	33	49	.402	26
12	e-Toronto Raptors	33	49	.402	26
13	e-Milwaukee Bucks	30	52	.366	29
14	e-Charlotte Bobcats	18	64	.220	41
15	e-Atlanta Hawks	13	69	.159	46

== Playoffs ==
2005 playoff game log
First Round: 3–4 (home: 1–3; road: 2–1)

Game	Date	Team	Score	High points	High rebounds	High assists	Location Attendance	Series
1	April 23	Indiana	W 102–82	Raef LaFrentz (21)	Paul Pierce (9)	Gary Payton (7)	FleetCenter; 18,624	1–0
2	April 25	Indiana	L 79–82	Paul Pierce (32)	Pierce, Walker (7)	Paul Pierce (5)	FleetCenter; 18,624	1–1
3	April 28	@ Indiana	L 76–99	Paul Pierce (19)	Antoine Walker (9)	Gary Payton (6)	Conseco Fieldhouse; 18,345	1–2
4	April 30	@ Indiana	W 110–79	Paul Pierce (30)	Jefferson, Pierce (7)	Paul Pierce (8)	Conseco Fieldhouse; 18,345	2–2
5	May 3	Indiana	L 85–90	Paul Pierce (27)	three players tied (7)	four players tied (3)	FleetCenter; 18,624	2–3
6	May 5	@ Indiana	W 92–89 (OT)	Antoine Walker 24	Al Jefferson 14	Paul Pierce 6	Conseco Fieldhouse; 18,345	3–3
7	May 7	Indiana	L 70–97	Antoine Walker (20)	three players tied (7)	Gary Payton (7)	FleetCenter; 18,624	3–4

2005 schedule

== Player statistics ==
Legend
GP	Games played	GS	Games started	MPG	Minutes per game
FG%	Field-goal percentage	3P%	3-point field-goal percentage	FT%	Free-throw percentage
RPG	Rebounds per game	APG	Assists per game	SPG	Steals per game
BPG	Blocks per game	PPG	Points per game

=== Regular season ===
Boston Celtics statistics
Player	GP	GS	MPG	FG%	3P%	FT%	RPG	APG	SPG	BPG	PPG
Tony Allen	77	34	16.4	.475	.387	.737	2.9	.8	1.0	.3	6.4
Marcus Banks	81	2	14.1	.402	.356	.742	1.6	1.9	.8	.2	4.6
Mark Blount	82	57	26.0	.529	.000	.713	4.8	1.6	.4	.8	9.4
Ricky Davis	82	11	32.9	.462	.339	.815	3.0	3.0	1.1	.3	16.0
Tom Gugliotta^{†}	20	0	10.9	.297		.667	2.2	.6	.5	.2	1.3
Al Jefferson	71	1	14.8	.528	.000	.630	4.4	.3	.3	.8	6.7
Raef LaFrentz	80	80	27.5	.496	.364	.811	6.9	1.2	.5	1.2	11.1
Walter McCarty^{†}	44	0	12.6	.413	.333	.533	1.8	.6	.3	.2	3.7
Gary Payton	77	77	33.0	.468	.326	.761	3.1	6.1	1.1	.2	11.3
Kendrick Perkins	60	3	9.1	.471		.638	2.9	.4	.2	.6	2.5
Paul Pierce	82	82	36.1	.455	.370	.822	6.6	4.2	1.6	.5	21.6
Justin Reed	23	0	5.3	.517	.000	.733	.7	.4	.1	.0	1.8
Antoine Walker^{†}	24	24	34.5	.442	.342	.557	8.3	3.0	1.0	1.1	16.3
Jiří Welsch^{†}	55	32	20.5	.428	.323	.773	2.5	1.5	.7	.1	7.5
Delonte West	39	7	13.0	.426	.358	.704	1.7	1.4	.5	.2	4.5

=== Playoffs ===
Boston Celtics statistics
Player	GP	GS	MPG	FG%	3P%	FT%	RPG	APG	SPG	BPG	PPG
Tony Allen	7	3	12.9	.444		.429	1.7	.3	.4	.3	2.7
Marcus Banks	7	0	15.1	.448	.500	.500	1.6	1.0	.6	.0	4.6
Mark Blount	4	0	10.8	.286		.000	1.5	.3	.0	.0	2.0
Ricky Davis	7	2	34.3	.432	.333	.769	3.6	2.0	1.3	.3	12.4
Al Jefferson	7	0	19.4	.415		.750	6.4	.3	.6	1.1	6.1
Raef LaFrentz	7	7	26.4	.390	.500	.800	4.9	1.1	.9	1.7	6.9
Gary Payton	7	7	34.1	.446	.071	.833	4.1	4.6	.9	.1	10.3
Kendrick Perkins	6	0	4.7	.800		.333	1.0	.0	.0	.5	1.5
Paul Pierce	7	7	39.6	.505	.259	.868	7.7	4.6	1.9	1.4	22.9
Justin Reed	6	0	3.7	.333	.000	.750	.2	.0	.0	.0	1.2
Antoine Walker	6	6	37.3	.413	.368	.636	7.3	2.3	1.2	1.0	16.7
Delonte West	7	3	16.4	.524	.455	.500	1.3	.6	1.0	.1	4.1

- ^{†} Denotes player spent time with another team in the season. Stats reflect time with the Celtics only.

== Transactions ==
=== Trades ===
August 2, 2004	To Boston Celtics Gary Payton, Rick Fox, conditional 1st round pick, and cash considerations	To Los Angeles Lakers Chris Mihm, Chucky Atkins, and Jumaine Jones
February 8, 2005	To Boston Celtics 2005 conditional 2nd round pick	To Phoenix Suns Walter McCarty, and cash considerations
February 24, 2005	To Boston Celtics Antoine Walker	To Atlanta Hawks Gary Payton, Tom Gugliotta, Michael Stewart, and future 1st round pick
February 24, 2005	To Boston Celtics 2007 1st round pick	To Cleveland Cavaliers Jiří Welsch

=== Free agents ===
==== Additions ====
Player	Signed	Former team
Mark Blount	July 14	re-signed
Chris Mihm	August 6	re-signed
Tom Gugliotta	August 16	Utah Jazz
Gary Payton	March 4	Atlanta Hawks

==== Subtractions ====
Player	Left	New team
Brandon Hunter	June 22	Charlotte Bobcats
Dana Barros	July 1	retired
Rick Fox	October 1	retired
Ernest Brown	October 25	Olympiacos

== See also ==
- 2004–05 NBA season
