= 2001–02 Boston Celtics season =

Season of National Basketball Association team the Boston Celtics

- Head coach: Jim O'Brien
- General manager: Chris Wallace
- Owner: Paul Gaston
- Arena: Fleet Center

Results
- Record: 49–33 (.598)
- Place: Division: 2nd (Atlantic); Conference: 3rd (Eastern)
- Playoff finish: Eastern Conference finals (lost to Nets 2–4)
- Stats at Basketball Reference

Local media
- Television: Fox Sports Net New England
- Radio: WWZN

The 2001–02 Boston Celtics season was the 56th season for the Boston Celtics in the National Basketball Association.

== Season summary ==
=== Off-season ===
The Celtics received the tenth overall pick in the 2001 NBA draft, and selected shooting guard Joe Johnson from the University of Arkansas; the team also selected small forward Kedrick Brown out of Okaloosa-Walton Community College with the eleventh overall pick. During the off-season, the team signed free agent Erick Strickland.

=== Regular season ===
With the addition of Johnson and Strickland, the Celtics struggled with a 5–6 start to the regular season, but then won 12 of their next 14 games, and later on held a 28–21 record at the All-Star break. At mid-season, the team traded Johnson, and Randy Brown to the Phoenix Suns in exchange for Rodney Rogers, and Tony Delk. The Celtics posted a seven-game winning streak in March, and won eight of their final nine games of the season, finishing in second place in the Atlantic Division with a 49–33 record, and earning the third seed in the Eastern Conference; the team qualified for the NBA playoffs for the first time since the 1994–95 season, ending a six-year playoff drought.

Paul Pierce averaged 26.1 points, 6.9 rebounds and 1.9 steals per game, contributed 210 three-point field goals, and was named to the All-NBA Third Team, while Antoine Walker averaged 22.1 points, 8.8 rebounds, 5.0 assists and 1.5 steals per game, and led the Celtics with 222 three-point field goals, and Rogers contributed 10.7 points and 4.0 rebounds per game in 27 games after the trade. In addition, Kenny Anderson provided the team with 9.6 points, 5.3 assists and 1.9 steals per game, while Strickland provided with 7.7 points per game, and Delk contributed 7.4 points per game in 22 games. Meanwhile, Tony Battie averaged 6.9 points and 6.5 rebounds per game, Eric Williams contributed 6.4 points per game, and Vitaly Potapenko provided with 4.6 points and 4.4 rebounds per game.

During the NBA All-Star weekend at the First Union Center in Philadelphia, Pennsylvania, Pierce and Walker were both selected for the 2002 NBA All-Star Game, as members of the Eastern Conference All-Star team; it was Pierce's first ever All-Star appearance. In addition, Pierce also participated in the NBA Three-Point Shootout, while before the mid-season trade, Johnson was selected for the NBA Rookie Challenge Game, as a member of the Rookies team. Pierce finished in eleventh place in Most Valuable Player voting, while head coach Jim O'Brien finished in sixth place in Coach of the Year voting.

The Celtics finished 18th in the NBA in home-game attendance, with an attendance of 659,751 at the FleetCenter during the regular season.

=== NBA playoffs ===
In the Eastern Conference First Round of the 2002 NBA playoffs, the Celtics faced off against the 6th–seeded Philadelphia 76ers, a team that featured All-Star guard Allen Iverson, All-Star center Dikembe Mutombo, and Derrick Coleman. The Celtics won the first two games over the 76ers at home at the FleetCenter, but then lost the next two games on the road, which included a Game 4 loss to the 76ers at the First Union Center, 83–81. With the series tied at 2–2, the Celtics won Game 5 over the 76ers at the FleetCenter, 120–87, in which Pierce scored 46 points and made 8 out of 10 three-point field-goal attempts; the Celtics won the series over the 76ers in five hard-fought games, and advanced to the second round of the NBA playoffs for the first time since the 1991–92 season.

In the Eastern Conference Semi-finals, the team faced off against the 2nd–seeded, and Central Division champion Detroit Pistons, who were led by All-Star guard Jerry Stackhouse, Clifford Robinson, and Defensive Player of the Year, Ben Wallace. The Celtics lost Game 1 to the Pistons on the road, 96–84 at The Palace of Auburn Hills, but managed to win Game 2 on the road, 85–77 to even the series. The Celtics won their next two home games, including a Game 4 win over the Pistons at the FleetCenter, 90–79 to take a 3–1 series lead. The Celtics won Game 5 over the Pistons at The Palace of Auburn Hills, 90–81 to win the series in five games, and advance to the Conference Finals for the first time since the 1987–88 season.

In the Eastern Conference Finals, the Celtics then faced off against the top–seeded, and Atlantic Division champion New Jersey Nets, who were led by the trio of All-Star guard Jason Kidd, second-year star Kenyon Martin, and Keith Van Horn. The Celtics lost Game 1 to the Nets on the road, 104–97 at the Continental Airlines Arena, but managed to win the next two games, including a Game 3 home win over the Nets at the FleetCenter, 94–90 to take a 2–1 series lead. However, the Celtics lost the next three games, including a Game 6 loss to the Nets at the FleetCenter, 96–88, thus losing the series in six games.

The Nets would advance to the NBA Finals for the first time in franchise history, but would lose to the 2-time defending NBA champion Los Angeles Lakers in a four-game sweep in the 2002 NBA Finals.

=== Aftermath ===
Following the season, Anderson and Potapenko were both traded to the Seattle SuperSonics, while Rogers signed as a free agent with the New Jersey Nets, Strickland signed with the Indiana Pacers, and Mark Blount signed with the Denver Nuggets.

== Draft picks ==
Round	Pick	Player	Position	Nationality	College
1	10	Joe Johnson	SG	United States	Arkansas
1	11	Kedrick Brown	SF/SG	United States	Okaloosa-Walton
1	21	Joseph Forte	SG	United States	North Carolina

== Roster ==
2001–02 Boston Celtics roster
Players

Pos.	No.	Player	Height	Weight	DOB	From
G	7	Kenny Anderson	6 ft 0 in (1.83 m)	168 lb (76 kg)	1970–10–09	Georgia Tech
C	4	Tony Battie	6 ft 11 in (2.11 m)	230 lb (104 kg)	1976–02–11	Texas Tech
C	30	Mark Blount	7 ft 0 in (2.13 m)	230 lb (104 kg)	1975–11–30	Pittsburgh
G/F	42	Kedrick Brown	6 ft 7 in (2.01 m)	222 lb (101 kg)	1981–03–18	Northwest Florida State
G	12	Omar Cook (IN)	6 ft 1 in (1.85 m)	190 lb (86 kg)	1968–05–22	St. John's
G	28	Tony Delk	6 ft 1 in (1.85 m)	189 lb (86 kg)	1974–01–28	Kentucky
G	40	Joseph Forte	6 ft 4 in (1.93 m)	194 lb (88 kg)	1981–03–23	North Carolina
F	0	Walter McCarty	6 ft 10 in (2.08 m)	230 lb (104 kg)	1974–02–01	Kentucky
F	5	Roshown McLeod (IN)	6 ft 8 in (2.03 m)	221 lb (100 kg)	1975–11–17	Duke
G/F	34	Paul Pierce	6 ft 6 in (1.98 m)	230 lb (104 kg)	1977–10–13	Kansas
F/C	52	Vitaly Potapenko	6 ft 10 in (2.08 m)	280 lb (127 kg)	1975–03–21	Wright State
F	54	Rodney Rogers	6 ft 7 in (2.01 m)	235 lb (107 kg)	1971–06–20	Wake Forest
G	20	Erick Strickland	6 ft 3 in (1.91 m)	210 lb (95 kg)	1973–11–25	Nebraska
F	8	Antoine Walker	6 ft 8 in (2.03 m)	224 lb (102 kg)	1976–08–12	Kentucky
F	55	Eric Williams	6 ft 8 in (2.03 m)	220 lb (100 kg)	1972–07–17	Providence

Coaches
Head coach
- Jim O'Brien
Assistant(s)
- John Carroll
- Lester Conner
- Dick Harter
- Frank Vogel

Legend
- (DP) Unsigned draft pick
- (FA) Free agent
- (S) Suspended
- (IN) Inactive
- Injured

Roster
Updated: 2002–04–16

=== Roster Notes ===
- Rookie point guard Omar Cook also holds American citizenship, but he represents Montenegro in international play; he was signed by the Celtics on April 16, 2002, but never played for the team.
- Small forward Roshown McLeod was on the injured reserve list due to a nerve ailment in his lower left leg, missed the entire regular season, and never played for the Celtics.

== Regular season ==
=== Standings ===
Atlantic Division	W	L	PCT	GB	Home	Road	Div
y-New Jersey Nets	52	30	.634	–	33–8	19–22	16–8
x-Boston Celtics	49	33	.598	3	27–14	22–19	17–7
x-Orlando Magic	44	38	.537	8	27–14	17–24	12–12
x-Philadelphia 76ers	43	39	.524	9	22–19	21–20	14–11
e-Washington Wizards	37	45	.451	15	22–19	15–26	12–13
e-Miami Heat	36	46	.439	16	18–23	18–23	10–14
e-New York Knicks	30	52	.366	22	19–22	11–30	4–20

#	Eastern Conference				
#	Team	W	L	PCT	GB
1	c-New Jersey Nets	52	30	.634	–
2	y-Detroit Pistons	50	32	.610	2
3	x-Boston Celtics	49	33	.598	3
4	x-Charlotte Hornets	44	38	.537	8
5	x-Orlando Magic	44	38	.537	8
6	x-Philadelphia 76ers	43	39	.524	9
7	x-Toronto Raptors	42	40	.512	10
8	x-Indiana Pacers	42	40	.512	10
9	e-Milwaukee Bucks	41	41	.500	11
10	e-Washington Wizards	37	45	.451	15
11	e-Miami Heat	36	46	.439	16
12	e-Atlanta Hawks	33	49	.402	19
13	e-New York Knicks	30	52	.366	22
14	e-Cleveland Cavaliers	29	53	.354	23
15	e-Chicago Bulls	21	61	.256	31

=== Game log ===
2001-02 game log
Total: 49–33 (home: 27–14; road: 22–19)
October (home: 0-1; road: 1-0)

Game	Date	Opponent	Score	Location	Record
1	Tue. Oct. 30	@ Cleveland Cavaliers	108–89	Gund Arena	1-0
2	Wed. Oct. 31	New Jersey Nets	92-95	FleetCenter	1-1

November (home: 4-2; road: 2-3)

Game	Date	Opponent	Score	Location	Record
3	Fri. Nov. 2	Chicago Bulls	96-82	FleetCenter	2–1
4	Sat. Nov. 3	@ Milwaukee Bucks	99-105	Bradley Center	2-2
5	Wed. Nov. 7	Washington Wizards	104-95	FleetCenter	3–2
6	Fri. Nov. 9	Seattle SuperSonics	104-94	FleetCenter	4–2
7	Wed. Nov. 14	Indiana Pacers	101-93	FleetCenter	5-2
8	Sat. Nov. 17	@ Atlanta Hawks	103-112	Philips Arena	5–3
9	Wed. Nov. 21	Atlanta Hawks	85-92	FleetCenter	5–4
10	Fri. Nov. 23	Toronto Raptors	89-91	FleetCenter	5-5
11	Sat. Nov. 24	@ Washington Wizards	84-88 (OT)	MCI Center	5–6
12	Tue. Nov. 27	@ Miami Heat	84-83	American Airlines Arena	6-6
13	Thu. Nov. 29	@ Orlando Magic	99-89	TD Waterhouse Centre	7–6

December (home: 6-0; road: 5-5)

Game	Date	Opponent	Score	Location	Record
14	Sat. Dec. 1	@ New Jersey Nets	105-98 (OT)	Continental Airlines Arena	8–6
15	Sun. Dec. 2	@ Toronto Raptors	85-69	Air Canada Centre	9–6
16	Wed. Dec. 5	Denver Nuggets	95-80	FleetCenter	10–6
17	Fri. Dec. 7	Phoenix Suns	109-102 (OT)	FleetCenter	11–6
18	Sat. Dec. 8	@ Chicago Bulls	84-87	United Center	11–7
19	Tue. Dec. 11	@ New York Knicks	102-93 (OT)	Madison Square Garden	12–7
20	Fri. Dec. 14	Chicago Bulls	107-101	FleetCenter	13–7
21	Sat. Dec. 15	@ Charlotte Hornets	106-97	Charlotte Coliseum	14–7
22	Mon. Dec. 17	@ Philadelphia 76ers	83-99	First Union Center	14–8
23	Wed. Dec. 19	Cleveland Cavaliers	104-98	FleetCenter	15–8
24	Fri. Dec. 21	Utah Jazz	98-92	FleetCenter	16–8
25	Sun. Dec. 23	Memphis Grizzlies	85-80	FleetCenter	17–8
26	Wed. Dec. 26	@ Utah Jazz	86-99	Delta Center	17–9
27	Thu. Dec. 27	@ Phoenix Suns	82-84	America West Arena	17–10
28	Sat. Dec. 29	@ Los Angeles Clippers	105-103 (OT)	Staples Center	18–10
29	Sun. Dec. 30	@ Sacramento Kings	94-109	ARCO Arena	18–11

January (home: 5-4; road: 3-4)

Game	Date	Opponent	Score	Location	Record
30	Wed. Jan. 2	Orlando Magic	110-94	FleetCenter	19–11
31	Fri. Jan. 4	Miami Heat	66-89	FleetCenter	19–12
32	Sat. Jan. 5	@ New York Knicks	90-81	Madison Square Garden	20–12
33	Mon. Jan. 7	@ Orlando Magic	87-98	TD Waterhouse Centre	20–13
34	Wed. Jan. 9	San Antonio Spurs	90-93	FleetCenter	20–14
35	Fri. Jan. 11	Detroit Pistons	104-90	FleetCenter	21–14
36	Sat. Jan. 12	@ Atlanta Hawks	115-91	Philips Arena	22–14
37	Wed. Jan. 16	New York Knicks	101-100	FleetCenter	23–14
38	Fri. Jan. 18	Houston Rockets	101-104	FleetCenter	23–15
39	Sat. Jan. 19	@ Detroit Pistons	91-94	The Palace of Auburn Hills	23–16
40	Mon. Jan. 21	Toronto Raptors	106-97	FleetCenter	24–16
41	Wed. Jan. 23	Indiana Pacers	98-94	FleetCenter	25–16
42	Fri. Jan. 25	Philadelphia 76ers	90-106	FleetCenter	25–17
43	Sat. Jan. 26	@ Cleveland Cavaliers	108-101	Gund Arena	26–17
44	Tue. Jan. 29	@ Milwaukee Bucks	90-109	Bradley Center	26–18
45	Thu. Jan. 31	@ Toronto Raptors	92-97	Air Canada Centre	26–19

February (home: 1-3; road: 4-4)

Game	Date	Opponent	Score	Location	Record
46	Fri. Feb. 1	Minnesota Timberwolves	95-98 (OT)	FleetCenter	26–20
47	Sun. Feb. 3	Los Angeles Clippers	104-91	FleetCenter	27–20
48	Tue. Feb. 5	@ Charlotte Hornets	82-79	Charlotte Coliseum	28–20
49	Wed. Feb. 6	Sacramento Kings	85-102	FleetCenter	28–21
50	Tue. Feb. 12	@ Denver Nuggets	110-93	Pepsi Center	29–21
51	Wed. Feb. 13	@ Golden State Warriors	75-92	The Arena in Oakland	29–22
52	Fri. Feb. 15	@ Portland Trail Blazers	107-104	Rose Garden	30–22
53	Sat. Feb. 16	@ Seattle SuperSonics	79-99	KeyArena	30–23
54	Tue. Feb. 19	@ Los Angeles Lakers	109-108	Staples Center	31–23
55	Thu. Feb. 21	@ Dallas Mavericks	92-98	American Airlines Center	31–24
56	Sat. Feb. 23	@ Houston Rockets	89-99	Compaq Center	31–25
57	Wed. Feb. 27	Milwaukee Bucks	92-95	FleetCenter	31–26

March (home: 7-4; road: 4-2)

Game	Date	Opponent	Score	Location	Record
58	Fri. Mar. 1	Charlotte Hornets	87-100	FleetCenter	31–27
59	Mon. Mar. 4	@ Philadelphia 76ers	100-94	First Union Center	32–27
60	Wed. Mar. 6	Orlando Magic	130-110	FleetCenter	33–27
61	Fri. Mar. 8	Detroit Pistons	117-92	FleetCenter	34–27
62	Sun. Mar. 10	Washington Wizards	98-91	FleetCenter	35–27
63	Mon. Mar. 11	@ Washington Wizards	104-99	MCI Center	36–27
64	Wed. Mar. 13	New Jersey Nets	97-89	FleetCenter	37–27
65	Fri. Mar. 15	@ Memphis Grizzlies	103-97	The Pyramid	38–27
66	Sat. Mar. 16	@ San Antonio Spurs	104-111	Alamodome	38–28
67	Mon. Mar. 18	Portland Trail Blazers	91-100	FleetCenter	38–29
68	Wed. Mar. 20	Cleveland Cavaliers	96-70	FleetCenter	39–29
69	Fri. Mar. 22	Philadelphia 76ers	91-96	FleetCenter	39–30
70	Sun. Mar. 24	@ Detroit Pistons	101-109	The Palace of Auburn Hills	39–31
71	Mon. Mar. 25	@ Miami Heat	87-82	American Airlines Arena	40–31
72	Wed. Mar. 27	Golden State Warriors	102-99	FleetCenter	41–31
73	Fri. Mar. 29	Dallas Mavericks	82-108	FleetCenter	41–32
74	Sun. Mar. 31	Milwaukee Bucks	110-80	FleetCenter	42–32

April (home: 4-0; road: 3-1)

Game	Date	Opponent	Score	Location	Record
75	Tue. Apr. 2	@ Indiana Pacers	105-94	Conseco Fieldhouse	43–32
76	Fri. Apr. 5	Los Angeles Lakers	99-81	FleetCenter	44–32
77	Sun. Apr. 7	@ New Jersey Nets	102-90	Continental Airlines Arena	45–32
78	Mon. Apr. 8	@ Chicago Bulls	100-105	United Center	45–33
79	Wed. Apr. 10	Miami Heat	70-65	FleetCenter	46–33
80	Fri. Apr. 12	New York Knicks	107-92	FleetCenter	47–33
81	Mon. Apr. 15	@ Minnesota Timberwolves	93-90	Target Center	48–33
82	Wed. Apr. 17	Atlanta Hawks	89-81	FleetCenter	49–33

2001-02 Schedule

== Playoffs ==
2002 playoff game log
First Round: 3–2 (home: 3–0; road: 0–2)

Game	Date	Team	Score	High points	High rebounds	High assists	Location Attendance	Series
1	April 21	Philadelphia	W 92–82	Paul Pierce (31)	Paul Pierce (11)	Kenny Anderson (5)	FleetCenter; 18,624	1–0
2	April 25	Philadelphia	W 93–85	Paul Pierce (25)	Pierce, Walker (10)	three players tied (4)	FleetCenter; 18,624	2–0
3	April 28	@ Philadelphia	L 103–108	Paul Pierce (29)	Rodney Rogers (11)	Paul Pierce (7)	First Union Center; 20,689	2–1
4	May 1	@ Philadelphia	L 81–83	Antoine Walker (25)	Paul Pierce (8)	Kenny Anderson (8)	First Union Center; 20,904	2–2
5	May 3	Philadelphia	W 120–87	Paul Pierce (46)	Antoine Walker (9)	Pierce, Walker (6)	FleetCenter; 18,624	3–2

Conference semifinals: 4–1 (home: 2–0; road: 2–1)

Game	Date	Team	Score	High points	High rebounds	High assists	Location Attendance	Series
1	May 5	@ Detroit	L 84–96	Antoine Walker (20)	Paul Pierce (10)	Paul Pierce (5)	The Palace of Auburn Hills; 20,252	0–1
2	May 8	@ Detroit	W 85–77	Paul Pierce (22)	Tony Battie (11)	Kenny Anderson (5)	The Palace of Auburn Hills; 22,076	1–1
3	May 10	Detroit	W 66–64	Paul Pierce (19)	Tony Battie (10)	Paul Pierce (5)	FleetCenter; 18,624	2–1
4	May 12	Detroit	W 90–79	Antoine Walker (30)	Paul Pierce (17)	Paul Pierce (6)	FleetCenter; 18,624	3–1
5	May 14	@ Detroit	W 90–81	Paul Pierce (18)	Antoine Walker (13)	Kenny Anderson (6)	The Palace of Auburn Hills; 22,076	4–1

Conference finals: 2–4 (home: 1–2; road: 1–2)

Game	Date	Team	Score	High points	High rebounds	High assists	Location Attendance	Series
1	May 19	@ New Jersey	L 97–104	Pierce, Walker (27)	Tony Battie (11)	Kenny Anderson (6)	Continental Airlines Arena; 20,049	0–1
2	May 21	@ New Jersey	W 93–86	Antoine Walker (26)	Paul Pierce (14)	Kenny Anderson (7)	Continental Airlines Arena; 19,850	1–1
3	May 25	New Jersey	W 94–90	Paul Pierce (28)	Antoine Walker (12)	Pierce, Walker (4)	FleetCenter; 18,624	2–1
4	May 27	New Jersey	L 92–94	Paul Pierce (31)	three players tied (9)	four players tied (4)	FleetCenter; 18,624	2–2
5	May 29	@ New Jersey	L 92–103	Paul Pierce (24)	Antoine Walker (13)	Kenny Anderson (6)	Continental Airlines Arena; 19,850	2–3
6	May 31	New Jersey	L 88–96	Kenny Anderson (18)	Antoine Walker (9)	Kenny Anderson (7)	FleetCenter; 18,624	2–4

2002 schedule

== Player statistics ==
Legend
GP	Games played	GS	Games started	MPG	Minutes per game
FG%	Field-goal percentage	3P%	3-point field-goal percentage	FT%	Free-throw percentage
RPG	Rebounds per game	APG	Assists per game	SPG	Steals per game
BPG	Blocks per game	PPG	Points per game

=== Regular season ===
Boston Celtics statistics
Player	GP	GS	MPG	FG%	3P%	FT%	RPG	APG	SPG	BPG	PPG
Kenny Anderson	76	76	32.0	.436	.273	.742	3.6	5.3	1.9	.1	9.6
Tony Battie	74	73	24.6	.541	.000	.677	6.5	.5	.8	.9	6.9
Mark Blount	44	0	9.4	.421		.811	1.9	.2	.4	.4	2.1
Kedrick Brown	29	5	8.4	.329	.185	.600	1.7	.5	.6	.2	2.2
Randy Brown	1	0	6.0	.000			.0	2.0	.0	1.0	.0
Tony Delk^{†}	22	16	25.9	.349	.299	.733	3.6	2.3	1.0	.3	7.4
Joseph Forte	8	0	4.9	.083	.000	1.000	.8	.8	.3	.0	.8
Joe Johnson^{†}	48	33	20.9	.439	.273	.769	2.9	1.5	.7	.2	6.3
Walter McCarty	56	0	12.8	.444	.394	.684	2.3	.7	.3	.1	3.8
Milt Palacio^{†}	41	0	12.6	.385	.353	.706	1.2	1.3	.5	.1	3.7
Paul Pierce	82	82	40.3	.442	.404	.809	6.9	3.2	1.9	1.0	26.1
Vitaly Potapenko	79	9	17.0	.455		.742	4.4	.4	.5	.2	4.6
Rodney Rogers^{†}	27	1	23.2	.482	.411	.700	4.0	1.5	.6	.4	10.7
Erick Strickland	79	4	20.8	.389	.385	.845	2.7	2.3	.7	.0	7.7
Antoine Walker	81	81	42.0	.394	.344	.741	8.8	5.0	1.5	.5	22.1
Eric Williams	74	30	23.6	.374	.279	.731	3.0	1.5	1.0	.1	6.4

=== Playoffs ===
Boston Celtics statistics
Player	GP	GS	MPG	FG%	3P%	FT%	RPG	APG	SPG	BPG	PPG
Kenny Anderson	16	16	35.0	.416		.800	3.1	4.8	1.3	.0	12.0
Tony Battie	16	16	27.7	.488		.619	7.6	.8	.6	1.9	6.1
Mark Blount	4	0	9.8	.500		1.000	1.8	.3	.5	.5	1.5
Kedrick Brown	2	0	1.5	1.000	1.000		.0	.0	.0	.5	2.5
Tony Delk	14	0	16.2	.354	.394	.583	2.4	1.1	.6	.4	4.7
Walter McCarty	14	0	13.9	.447	.167	.778	2.4	.3	.3	.0	3.1
Paul Pierce	16	16	42.0	.403	.288	.764	8.6	4.1	1.7	1.3	24.6
Rodney Rogers	16	0	24.6	.426	.365	.886	5.5	2.1	1.0	.4	8.9
Erick Strickland	12	0	9.8	.282	.200	1.000	1.1	1.4	.4	.1	2.9
Antoine Walker	16	16	43.9	.411	.385	.781	8.6	3.3	1.5	.4	22.1
Eric Williams	16	16	30.4	.500	.467	.739	4.4	1.3	1.6	.3	7.8

- ^{†} Denotes player spent time with another team in the season. Stats reflect time with the Celtics only.

Player statistics citation:

== Awards and records ==
- Paul Pierce, All-NBA Third Team

== See also ==
- Reebok Pro Summer League, a summer league hosted by the Celtics
