= Mark Blount =

American basketball player (born 1975)

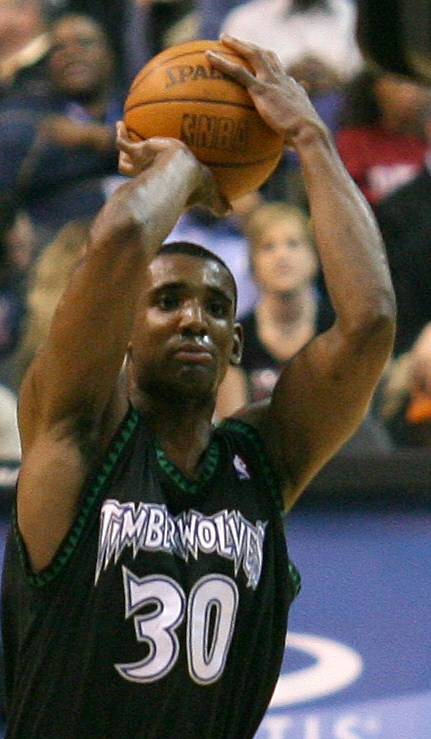
- Blount with the Minnesota Timberwolves in 2007

Personal information
- Born: November 30, 1975 (age 50) Yonkers, New York, U.S.
- Listed height: 7 ft 0 in (2.13 m)
- Listed weight: 250 lb (113 kg)

Career information
- High school: Summerville (Summerville, South Carolina); Oak Hill Academy (Mouth of Wilson, Virginia); Dobbs Ferry (Dobbs Ferry, New York)
- College: Pittsburgh (1995–1997)
- NBA draft: 1997: 2nd round, 54th overall pick
- Drafted by: Seattle SuperSonics
- Playing career: 1997–2009
- Position: Center
- Number: 30, 15

Career history
- 1997: Yakima Sun Kings
- 1997–1998: Paris Basket Racing
- 1998: Atlantic City Seagulls
- 1998: La Crosse Bobcats
- 1999–2000: Baltimore Bayrunners
- 2000: New Jersey Shorecats
- 2000–2002: Boston Celtics
- 2002–2003: Denver Nuggets
- 2003–2006: Boston Celtics
- 2006–2007: Minnesota Timberwolves
- 2007–2009: Miami Heat

Career highlights
- Third-team Parade All-American (1995); Fourth-team Parade All-American (1994)

Career NBA statistics
- Points: 4,941 (8.2 ppg)
- Rebounds: 2,784 (4.6 rpg)
- Blocks: 508 (0.8 bpg)
- Stats at NBA.com
- Stats at Basketball Reference

Mark D. Blount (/ˈblʌnt/ BLUNT; born November 30, 1975) is an American former professional basketball center with four teams in the National Basketball Association between 2000 and 2009.

== Career ==
Blount spent his freshman year of high school in Summerville, South Carolina, playing for Summerville High School. He then transferred to Oak Hill Academy in Virginia. He then went to Dobbs Ferry High School in Dobbs Ferry for his senior year and was named Mr. Basketball for Westchester County. He played his collegiate basketball at the University of Pittsburgh before being drafted 54th overall in the 1997 NBA draft by the Seattle SuperSonics, and spent three seasons in the minor American leagues.

He was first signed by the Boston Celtics as a free agent on August 1, 2000, and led the team with 76 blocks that season, the most by a Celtics rookie since Kevin McHale in 1980–81.

During the 2003–04 NBA season, Blount put up 10.3 points, 7.2 rebounds, and 1.29 blocks per game in 29.3 minutes per game. He had a 28-point, 21-rebound game vs. the Orlando Magic on March 1, 2004. Following the season, Blount signed a six-year, $41 million contract with the Celtics.

== Off the court ==
When his career ended in 2010, Blount purchased investment properties in Palm Beach Gardens, Florida as well as opening Auntie Anne's franchises in the area. As of 2018, he lived in Fort Lauderdale, Florida and continued to invest in real estate. He is the author of the book My First Triple Double.

== Transactions ==
- August 1, 2000 – Signed with the Boston Celtics as a free agent.
- August 8, 2002 – Signed with the Denver Nuggets as a free agent.
- February 20, 2003 – Traded to the Boston Celtics alongside Mark Bryant for Shammond Williams and cash and draft considerations.
- On January 26, 2006, Blount, along with Ricky Davis, Marcus Banks, Justin Reed, and two conditional second-round draft picks, were traded to the Minnesota Timberwolves for Wally Szczerbiak, Michael Olowokandi, Dwayne Jones and a conditional first-round draft pick.
- On October 24, 2007, Blount was traded to the Miami Heat along with teammate Ricky Davis in exchange for the Heat's Antoine Walker, Michael Doleac, Wayne Simien and a first-round draft pick.
- On August 13, 2009, he was traded back to the Minnesota Timberwolves for Quentin Richardson.
- On March 1, 2010, Blount was waived by the Timberwolves.

== NBA career statistics ==
Legend
GP	Games played	GS	Games started	MPG	Minutes per game
FG%	Field goal percentage	3P%	3-point field goal percentage	FT%	Free throw percentage
RPG	Rebounds per game	APG	Assists per game	SPG	Steals per game
BPG	Blocks per game	PPG	Points per game	**Bold**	Career high
*	Led the league

=== Regular season ===
Year	Team	GP	GS	MPG	FG%	3P%	FT%	RPG	APG	SPG	BPG	PPG
2000–01	Boston	64	50	17.2	.505	.000	.697	3.6	.5	.6	1.2	3.9
2001–02	Boston	44	0	9.4	.421	.000	**.811**	1.9	.2	.4	.4	2.1
2002–03	Denver	54	24	16.4	.393	.000	.717	3.4	.6	.4	.9	5.2
2002–03	Boston	27	7	19.2	.563	.000	.750	4.6	.8	.7	.6	4.4
2003–04	Boston	**82**	73	29.3	**.566**	.000	.719	**7.2**	.9	**1.0**	**1.3**	10.3
2004–05	Boston	**82**	57	26.0	.529	.000	.713	4.8	1.6	.4	.8	9.4
2005–06	Boston	39	25	27.8	.511	.000	.764	4.2	**1.7**	.4	.9	**12.4**
2005–06	Minnesota	42	30	27.5	.506	.000	.747	4.8	.8	.6	1.0	10.2
2006–07	Minnesota	**82***	**81**	**31.0**	.509	.290	.754	6.2	.8	.5	.7	12.3
2007–08	Miami	69	46	22.3	.462	.386	.638	3.8	.6	.5	.5	8.4
2008–09	Miami	20	0	10.4	.385	**.407**	.615	2.1	.2	.1	.4	4.0
Career		605	393	23.1	.504	.359	.723	4.6	.8	.5	.8	8.2

=== Playoffs ===
Year	Team	GP	GS	MPG	FG%	3P%	FT%	RPG	APG	SPG	BPG	PPG
2002	Boston	4	0	9.8	.500	.000	**1.000**	1.8	.3	.5	.5	1.5
2003	Boston	**10**	0	14.4	**.545**	.000	.700	3.6	.2	1.1	.8	3.1
2004	Boston	4	**4**	**36.3**	.486	.000	.737	**9.3**	**1.0**	**1.5**	**2.0**	**12.0**
2005	Boston	4	0	10.8	.286	.000	.000	1.5	.3	.0	.0	2.0
Career		22	4	16.9	.467	.000	.697	3.9	.4	.9	.8	4.2
