= Eric Williams (basketball, born 1972) =

American basketball player (born 1972)

Personal information
- Born: July 17, 1972 (age 54) Newark, New Jersey, U.S.
- Listed height: 6 ft 8 in (2.03 m)
- Listed weight: 220 lb (100 kg)

Career information
- High school: Malcolm X Shabazz (Newark, New Jersey)
- College: Vincennes (1991–1993); Providence (1993–1995)
- NBA draft: 1995: 1st round, 14th overall pick
- Drafted by: Boston Celtics
- Playing career: 1995–2007
- Position: Small forward / shooting guard
- Number: 55, 32, 17

Career history
- 1995–1997: Boston Celtics
- 1997–1999: Denver Nuggets
- 1999–2003: Boston Celtics
- 2003–2004: Cleveland Cavaliers
- 2004: New Jersey Nets
- 2004–2006: Toronto Raptors
- 2006–2007: San Antonio Spurs
- 2007: Charlotte Bobcats

Career highlights
- First-team All-Big East (1995)

Career NBA statistics
- Points: 5,642 (8.6 ppg)
- Rebounds: 2,139 (3.3 rpg)
- Assists: 936 (1.4 apg)
- Stats at NBA.com
- Stats at Basketball Reference

Eric C. Williams (born July 17, 1972) is an American former professional basketball player who played in the National Basketball Association (NBA) from 1995 to 2007. He played for seven teams during his career, including two stints with the Boston Celtics.

== Career ==
Following a collegiate career which began at Burlington County College in New Jersey, then two years at Vincennes University in Indiana, followed by Providence College in Rhode Island, the 6' 8" small forward was selected by the Boston Celtics with the 14th pick in the 1995 NBA draft. He played two years with them before being traded to the Denver Nuggets during the 1997 offseason for a couple of second round draft picks. The Nuggets only got four games out of Williams during the 1997–98 campaign due to him tearing the anterior cruciate ligament in his right knee. The following season, he returned, but only played in 38 of 82 regular season games with Denver before they repatriated him back to Boston along with Danny Fortson and Eric Washington plus a future draft pick in exchange for Ron Mercer, Ronald "Popeye" Jones, and Dwayne Schintzius. His second tenure with the Celtics lasted over four seasons until they traded him to the Cleveland Cavaliers along with Tony Battie and Kedrick Brown in a swap for Ricky Davis, Chris Mihm, Michael Stewart, and a second round draft pick on December 15, 2003. He became a free agent after 50 games with the Cavaliers, and signed with the New Jersey Nets prior to the 2004–05 season. Williams was soon part of a blockbuster player trade when the Nets sent him, Aaron Williams, Alonzo Mourning and two future first-round draft picks to the Toronto Raptors for franchise player Vince Carter.

In 2005, Williams decided to launch his own line of clothing honoring the fictional Negro Basketball League.

On June 21, 2006, Williams was traded with Matt Bonner and a second round pick in the 2009 NBA draft to San Antonio for Rasho Nesterovič and cash.

On February 13, 2007, he was traded along with the 2nd round pick in the 2009 NBA draft that the Spurs got from the Raptors to the Charlotte Bobcats for Melvin Ely. On March 16, Williams was waived by the Bobcats to make room for Alan Anderson.

He holds career averages of 8.6 points, 3.3 rebounds and 1.4 assists per game.

== Life outside basketball ==
Williams, whose wife was Jennifer Williams from 2007 to 2011, appeared in multiple episodes of the reality TV show Basketball Wives from seasons 1–4. Eric also went on to appear in the 2013 film The Caribbean Heist. In 2015 Williams was featured in the painting, "Freedom from What," an artwork by Pops Peterson based on "Freedom from Fear" by Norman Rockwell.

== Career statistics ==
Legend
GP	Games played	GS	Games started	MPG	Minutes per game
FG%	Field goal percentage	3P%	3-point field goal percentage	FT%	Free throw percentage
RPG	Rebounds per game	APG	Assists per game	SPG	Steals per game
BPG	Blocks per game	PPG	Points per game	**Bold**	Career high

=== NBA ===
==== Regular season ====
Year	Team	GP	GS	MPG	FG%	3P%	FT%	RPG	APG	SPG	BPG	PPG
1995–96	Boston	64	6	23.0	.441	.300	.671	3.4	1.1	.9	**.2**	10.7
1996–97	Boston	72	67	33.8	.456	.250	.752	4.6	1.8	**1.0**	**.2**	15.0
1997–98	Denver	4	4	**36.3**	.393	–	.689	**5.3**	**3.0**	**1.0**	.0	**19.8**
1998–99	Denver	38	8	20.5	.365	.231	**.799**	2.1	1.0	.7	**.2**	7.3
1999–00	Boston	68	17	20.3	.427	.347	.793	2.3	1.4	.6	**.2**	7.2
2000–01	Boston	81	11	21.5	.362	.331	.714	2.6	1.4	.8	**.2**	6.6
2001–02	Boston	74	30	23.6	.374	.279	.731	3.0	1.5	**1.0**	.1	6.4
2002–03	Boston	**82**	**79**	28.7	.442	.336	.750	4.7	1.7	**1.0**	**.2**	9.1
2003–04	Boston	21	0	24.4	.435	.344	.716	4.5	1.2	**1.0**	.0	11.6
2003–04	Cleveland	50	36	27.5	.366	.253	.787	3.8	1.9	**1.0**	**.2**	9.4
2004–05	New Jersey	21	21	35.2	**.470**	.425	.685	4.5	2.0	.8	.1	12.6
2004–05	Toronto	34	18	17.1	.379	.333	.717	2.3	1.5	.6	.1	4.7
2005–06	Toronto	28	11	12.6	.387	.278	.737	1.8	.5	.3	.1	3.3
2006–07	San Antonio	16	0	5.5	.441	**.471**	.571	.9	.4	.1	.0	2.6
2006–07	Charlotte	5	0	6.6	.308	.000	.571	.6	.2	.2	.0	2.4
Career		658	308	23.9	.415	.318	.736	3.3	1.4	.8	.2	8.6

==== Playoffs ====
Year	Team	GP	GS	MPG	FG%	3P%	FT%	RPG	APG	SPG	BPG	PPG
2002	Boston	**16**	**16**	30.4	**.500**	**.467**	.739	**4.4**	1.3	**1.6**	**.3**	7.8
2003	Boston	11	0	**31.0**	.375	.200	**.794**	3.2	**1.7**	.9	.0	**9.6**
Career		27	16	30.7	.440	.378	.772	3.9	1.5	1.3	.2	8.5
