= 2003–04 Cleveland Cavaliers season =

NBA professional basketball team season

- Head coach: Paul Silas
- President: Jim Paxson
- General manager: Jim Paxson
- Owners: Gordon Gund; George Gund III
- Arena: Gund Arena

Results
- Record: 35–47 (.427)
- Place: Division: 5th (Central); Conference: 9th (Eastern)
- Playoff finish: Did not qualify
- Stats at Basketball Reference

Local media
- Television: Fox Sports Net Ohio · WUAB
- Radio: WTAM

The 2003–04 Cleveland Cavaliers season was the 34th season of the National Basketball Association in Cleveland, Ohio. In the years following their 1998 first-round playoff loss to the Indiana Pacers, the Cavaliers dropped to the bottom of the league and became a perennial entrant in the annual NBA draft lottery. The franchise's freefall bottomed out during the 2002–03 season, as the Cavs fell to a 17–65 record, tied with the Denver Nuggets for the league's worst.

However, the fortunes of the franchise shifted dramatically in May 2003, when the Cavs won the first overall pick in the draft lottery. The Cavaliers selected high school phenom LeBron James from St. Vincent–St. Mary High School in nearby Akron, providing the team with a centerpiece player around which to build.

The Cavaliers revised their look for the 2003–04 season, introducing a new logo and a variation on the wine and gold color scheme used by the club during the 1970s. Dark blue was also added as a trim color. Both the logo and uniforms lasted until 2010 during James' first stint in Cleveland before leaving the team to join the Miami Heat. He had controversially announced his departure from Cleveland in a nationally televised special on July 8, 2010.

The team made major moves during the season, trading Ricky Davis, Chris Mihm, Michael Stewart and a second-round draft pick to the Boston Celtics in exchange for Eric Williams, Tony Battie, and Kedrick Brown. Later, Darius Miles was traded to the Portland Trail Blazers for Jeff McInnis and Ruben Boumtje Boumtje.

The Cavaliers lost their first five games of the season, leading them to an awful 6–19 start. However, they played .500 basketball for the remainder of the season, finishing fifth in the Central Division with a 35–47 record. They fell just one game short of making the playoffs. James was named Rookie of the Year and selected to the All-Rookie First Team. Following the season, second-year forward Carlos Boozer signed as a free agent with the Utah Jazz.

== Offseason ==
Despite James being with Cleveland for the first season, Cleveland still did not make the playoffs, still needing improvement.

== Draft picks ==
| Round | Pick | Player | Position | Nationality | School/Club team |
|---|---|---|---|---|---|
| 1 | 1 | LeBron James | Small Forward | (United States) USA | St. Vincent-St.Mary (Akron, OH) |
| 2 | 31 | Jason Kapono | Forward | (United States) USA | UCLA |

== Roster ==
2003–04 Cleveland Cavaliers roster
Players

| Pos. | No. | Player | Height | Weight | DOB | From |
|---|---|---|---|---|---|---|
| F/C | 4 | Tony Battie | 6 ft 11 in (2.11 m) | 240 lb (109 kg) | 1976-02-11 | Texas Tech |
| F | 1 | Carlos Boozer | 6 ft 9 in (2.06 m) | 258 lb (117 kg) | 1981-11-20 | Duke |
| SF | 5 | Kedrick Brown | 6 ft 7 in (2.01 m) | 220 lb (100 kg) | 1981-03-18 | Northwest Florida State |
| C | 52 | DeSagana Diop | 7 ft 0 in (2.13 m) | 280 lb (127 kg) | 1982-01-30 | Oak Hill Academy (HS) |
| C | 11 | Zydrunas Ilgauskas | 7 ft 3 in (2.21 m) | 238 lb (108 kg) | 1975-06-05 | Lithuania |
| F | 23 | LeBron James | 6 ft 8 in (2.03 m) | 240 lb (109 kg) | 1984-12-30 | St. Vincent-St. Mary (HS) |
| F | 24 | Jason Kapono | 6 ft 8 in (2.03 m) | 215 lb (98 kg) | 1981-02-04 | UCLA |
| G | 0 | Jeff McInnis | 6 ft 4 in (1.93 m) | 179 lb (81 kg) | 1974-10-22 | North Carolina |
| F | 54 | Lee Nailon | 6 ft 9 in (2.06 m) | 240 lb (109 kg) | 1975-02-22 | TCU |
| F | 14 | Ira Newble | 6 ft 7 in (2.01 m) | 220 lb (100 kg) | 1975-01-20 | Miami (OH) |
| G | 12 | Kevin Ollie | 6 ft 2 in (1.88 m) | 195 lb (88 kg) | 1972-12-27 | Connecticut |
| SG | 2 | Dajuan Wagner | 6 ft 2 in (1.88 m) | 200 lb (91 kg) | 1983-02-04 | Memphis |
| F | 55 | Eric Williams (injured) | 6 ft 8 in (2.03 m) | 220 lb (100 kg) | 1972-07-17 | Providence |

Coaches
Head coach
- Paul Silas
Assistant(s)
- Bob Donewald Jr.
- Mark Osowski
- Stephen Silas

Legend
- (DP) Unsigned draft pick
- (FA) Free agent
- (S) Suspended
- Injured

Roster
Updated: April 6, 2004

== Regular season ==
- Facing the Sacramento Kings in his first NBA game, LeBron James recorded 25 points, 9 assists, 6 rebounds, and 4 steals and shooting 60% from the field. After recording a season-high 41 points against the New Jersey Nets, James became the youngest player in league history to score 40 points in a game. He averaged 20.9 points, 5.9 assists, and 5.5 rebounds per game for the season, and was named Rookie of the Year; becoming the first Cavalier and youngest NBA player to ever receive the award. He joined Oscar Robertson and Michael Jordan as the only three players in NBA history to average at least 20 points, 5 rebounds, and 5 assists per game in their rookie season. The Cavaliers improved by 18 wins and concluded the regular season with a 35–47 record, but failed to make the playoffs.

=== Standings ===
| Central Division | W | L | PCT | GB | Home | Road | Div |
|---|---|---|---|---|---|---|---|
| y-Indiana Pacers | 61 | 21 | .744 | – | 34–7 | 27–14 | 20–8 |
| x-Detroit Pistons | 54 | 28 | .659 | 7 | 31–10 | 23–18 | 17–11 |
| x-New Orleans Hornets | 41 | 41 | .500 | 20 | 25–16 | 16–25 | 14–14 |
| x-Milwaukee Bucks | 41 | 41 | .500 | 20 | 27–14 | 14–27 | 15–13 |
| e-Cleveland Cavaliers | 35 | 47 | .427 | 26 | 23–18 | 12–29 | 14–14 |
| e-Toronto Raptors | 33 | 49 | .402 | 28 | 18–23 | 15–26 | 11–17 |
| e-Atlanta Hawks | 28 | 54 | .341 | 33 | 18–23 | 10–31 | 10–18 |
| e-Chicago Bulls | 23 | 59 | .280 | 38 | 14–27 | 9–32 | 11–17 |

| # | Eastern Conference | | | | |
| # | Team | W | L | PCT | GB |
|---|---|---|---|---|---|
| 1 | z-Indiana Pacers | 61 | 21 | .744 | – |
| 2 | y-New Jersey Nets | 47 | 35 | .573 | 14 |
| 3 | x-Detroit Pistons | 54 | 28 | .659 | 7 |
| 4 | x-Miami Heat | 42 | 40 | .512 | 19 |
| 5 | x-New Orleans Hornets | 41 | 41 | .500 | 20 |
| 6 | x-Milwaukee Bucks | 41 | 41 | .500 | 20 |
| 7 | x-New York Knicks | 39 | 43 | .476 | 22 |
| 8 | x-Boston Celtics | 36 | 46 | .439 | 25 |
| 9 | e-Cleveland Cavaliers | 35 | 47 | .427 | 26 |
| 10 | e-Toronto Raptors | 33 | 49 | .402 | 28 |
| 11 | e-Philadelphia 76ers | 33 | 49 | .402 | 28 |
| 12 | e-Atlanta Hawks | 28 | 54 | .341 | 33 |
| 13 | e-Washington Wizards | 25 | 57 | .305 | 36 |
| 14 | e-Chicago Bulls | 23 | 59 | .280 | 38 |
| 15 | e-Orlando Magic | 21 | 61 | .256 | 40 |

== Game log ==
2003–04 game log
Total: 35–47 (Home: 23–18; Road: 12–29)
October: 0–2 (home: 0–0; road: 0–2)

| Game | Date | Team | Score | High points | High rebounds | High assists | Location Attendance | Record |
|---|---|---|---|---|---|---|---|---|
| 1 | October 29 | @ Sacramento | L 92–106 | LeBron James (25) | Carlos Boozer (11) | LeBron James (9) | ARCO Arena; 17,317 | 0–1 |
| 2 | October 30 | @ Phoenix | L 86–95 | Ricky Davis (22) | Carlos Boozer (14) | LeBron James (8) | America West Arena; 18,422 | 0–2 |

November : 4–11 (home: 4–3; road: 0–8)

| Game | Date | Team | Score | High points | High rebounds | High assists | Location Attendance | Record |
|---|---|---|---|---|---|---|---|---|
| 3 | November 1 | @ Portland | L 85–104 | Zydrunas Ilgauskas (21) | Carlos Boozer (9) | Ricky Davis (7) | Rose Garden; 20,610 | 0–3 |
| 4 | November 5 | Denver | L 89–93 | Zydrunas Ilgauskas (23) | LeBron James (11) | James, Ollie (7) | Gund Arena; 20,562 | 0–4 |
| 5 | November 7 | @ Indiana | L 90–91 | LeBron James (23) | Ricky Davis (12) | Ricky Davis (10) | Conseco Fieldhouse; 18,345 | 0–5 |
| 6 | November 8 | Washington | W 111–98 | Miles, Davis (26) | James, Davis, Boozer (8) | LeBron James (9) | Gund Arena; 17,706 | 1–5 |
| 7 | November 10 | New York | W 94–80 | Chris Mihm (19) | Carlos Boozer (8) | Ricky Davis (8) | Gund Arena; 16,422 | 2–5 |
| 8 | November 12 | @ Miami | L 83–88 | Zydrunas Ilgauskas (20) | Carlos Boozer (16) | LeBron James (7) | American Airlines Arena; 15,329 | 2–6 |
| 9 | November 14 | @ Boston | L 82–91 | Zydrunas Ilgauskas (22) | Carlos Boozer (11) | Ricky Davis (6) | FleetCenter; 18,624 | 2–7 |
| 10 | November 15 | Philadelphia | W 91–88 (OT) | Zydrunas Ilgauskas (28) | Carlos Boozer (15) | LeBron James (8) | Gund Arena; 20,562 | 3–7 |
| 11 | November 18 | L.A. Clippers | W 103–95 | Ricky Davis (27) | Zydrunas Ilgauskas (10) | LeBron James (8) | Gund Arena; 16,176 | 4–7 |
| 12 | November 19 | @ Washington | L 95–106 | LeBron James (28) | Chris Mihm (12) | James, Ollie (8) | MCI Center; 19,705 | 4–8 |
| 13 | November 21 | Minnesota | L 83–97 | LeBron James (19) | Zydrunas Ilgauskas (12) | Ricky Davis (6) | Gund Arena; 19,269 | 4–9 |
| 14 | November 22 | @ Atlanta | L 83–92 | Zydrunas Ilgauskas (21) | Zydrunas Ilgauskas (10) | Ricky Davis (6) | Philips Arena; 19,445 | 4–10 |
| 15 | November 26 | @ New Orleans | L 72–82 | Zydrunas Ilgauskas (20) | James, Mihm (8) | LeBron James (9) | New Orleans Arena; 16,410 | 4–11 |
| 16 | November 28 | @ Detroit | L 88–92 | Ricky Davis (25) | Chris Mihm (13) | LeBron James (7) | The Palace of Auburn Hills; 22,076 | 4–12 |
| 17 | November 29 | Memphis | L 115–122 (2OT) | LeBron James (33) | LeBron James (16) | James, Davis (7) | Gund Arena; 18,102 | 4–13 |

December : 6–9 (home: 4–5; road: 2–4)

| Game | Date | Team | Score | High points | High rebounds | High assists | Location Attendance | Record |
|---|---|---|---|---|---|---|---|---|
| 18 | December 2 | @ Denver | L 103–115 | LeBron James (19) | Zydrunas Ilgauskas (13) | Davis, James (5) | Pepsi Center; 19,610 | 4–14 |
| 19 | December 3 | @ L.A. Clippers | L 80–90 | Zydrunas Ilgauskas (24) | Carlos Boozer (21) | LeBron James (8) | Staples Center; 17,445 | 4–15 |
| 20 | December 6 | Atlanta | W 95–85 | Zydrunas Ilgauskas (19) | Carlos Boozer (10) | LeBron James (5) | Gund Arena; 17,390 | 5–15 |
| 21 | December 9 | Toronto | L 93–100 | LeBron James (18) | Ira Newble (10) | Ricky Davis (6) | Gund Arena; 16,139 | 5–16 |
| 22 | December 11 | Detroit | W 95–86 | Carlos Boozer (28) | Chris Mihm (10) | LeBron James (9) | Gund Arena; 15,115 | 6–16 |
| 23 | December 13 | Boston | L 98–105 | LeBron James (37) | Carlos Boozer (15) | Ricky Davis (8) | Gund Arena; 17,353 | 6–17 |
| 24 | December 15 | @ Indiana | L 85–95 | LeBron James (27) | Zydrunas Ilgauskas (7) | LeBron James (6) | Conseco Fieldhouse; 14,951 | 6–18 |
| 25 | December 17 | Houston | L 85–89 | Zydrunas Ilgauskas (19) | Carlos Boozer (11) | Kevin Ollie (6) | Gund Arena; 14,567 | 6–19 |
| 26 | December 19 | @ Philadelphia | W 88–81 | LeBron James (36) | Zydrunas Ilgauskas (9) | Kevin Ollie (12) | Wachovia Center; 20,761 | 7–19 |
| 27 | December 20 | @ Chicago | W 95–87 | LeBron James (32) | Zydrunas Ilgauskas (12) | LeBron James (10) | United Center; 22,282 | 8–19 |
| 28 | December 23 | New Orleans | W 97–86 | LeBron James (22) | Carlos Boozer (14) | J. R. Bremer (4) | Gund Arena; 16,609 | 9–19 |
| 29 | December 25 | @ Orlando | L 101–113 (OT) | LeBron James (34) | Carlos Boozer (19) | LeBron James (6) | TD Waterhouse Centre; 17,283 | 9–20 |
| 30 | December 26 | Chicago | L 80–87 | LeBron James (18) | Carlos Boozer (14) | Darius Miles (5) | Gund Arena; 20,562 | 9–21 |
| 31 | December 28 | Portland | W 86–74 | LeBron James (32) | Carlos Boozer (13) | LeBron James (9) | Gund Arena; 18,109 | 10–21 |
| 32 | December 30 | Indiana | L 89–92 | LeBron James (22) | Carlos Boozer (11) | Carlos Boozer (6) | Gund Arena; 18,648 | 10–22 |

January : 7–7 (home: 5–1; road: 2–6)

| Game | Date | Team | Score | High points | High rebounds | High assists | Location Attendance | Record |
|---|---|---|---|---|---|---|---|---|
| 33 | January 2 | @ New Jersey | L 82–97 | Carlos Boozer (16) | Carlos Boozer (13) | LeBron James (9) | Continental Airlines Arena; 19,968 | 10–23 |
| 34 | January 6 | New York | W 107–96 | Zydrunas Ilgauskas (24) | Tony Battie (8) | LeBron James (10) | Gund Arena; 15,277 | 11–23 |
| 35 | January 7 | @ Toronto | L 69–75 | LeBron James (21) | Zydrunas Ilgauskas (12) | LeBron James (5) | Air Canada Centre; 19,874 | 11–24 |
| 36 | January 9 | @ Boston | L 82–107 | LeBron James (19) | Tony Battie (13) | LeBrob James (6) | FleetCenter; 18,624 | 11–25 |
| 37 | January 12 | @ L.A. Lakers | L 79–89 | Zydrunas Ilgauskas (19) | Carlos Boozer (12) | LeBron James (7) | Staples Center; 18,997 | 11–26 |
| 38 | January 13 | @ Seattle | W 104–96 | LeBron James (27) | Zydrunas Ilgauskas (10) | LeBron James (9) | KeyArena; 17,072 | 12–26 |
| 39 | January 15 | @ Golden State | L 102–119 | LeBron James (29) | Carlos Boozer (10) | LeBron James (6) | The Arena in Oakland; 19,602 | 12–27 |
| 40 | January 17 | @ Utah | W 102–96 (OT) | Carlos Boozer (32) | Carlos Boozer (18) | Eric Williams (5) | Delta Center; 19,622 | 13–27 |
| 41 | January 20 | Seattle | W 99–94 | Carlos Boozer (32) | Carlos Boozer (20) | Carlos Boozer (4) | Gund Arena; 14,048 | 14–27 |
| 42 | January 22 | Sacramento | L 89–95 | Dajuan Wagner (20) | Carlos Boozer (11) | Kevin Ollie (9) | Gund Arena; 17,720 | 14–28 |
| 43 | January 24 | Philadelphia | W 95–87 | Eric Williams (20) | Carlos Boozer (15) | Jeff McInnis (6) | Gund Arena; 20,562 | 15–28 |
| 44 | January 26 | Orlando | W 99–98 | Carlos Boozer (23) | Carlos Boozer (16) | Jeff McInnis (7) | Gund Arena; 14,382 | 16–28 |
| 45 | January 28 | Miami | W 94–93 | Zydrunas Ilgauskas (30) | Zydrunas Ilgauskas (11) | Jeff McInnis (8) | Gund Arena; 14,433 | 17–28 |
| 46 | January 30 | @ Milwaukee | L 95–101 | LeBron James (20) | Zydrunas Ilgauskas (11) | Jeff McInnis (5) | Bradley Center; 18,717 | 17–29 |

February : 7–6 (home: 3–4; road: 4–2)

| Game | Date | Team | Score | High points | High rebounds | High assists | Location Attendance | Record |
|---|---|---|---|---|---|---|---|---|
| 47 | February 1 | @ Washington | W 104–100 | LeBron James (38) | Carlos Boozer (14) | Jeff McInnis (9) | MCI Center; 15,541 | 18–29 |
| 48 | February 3 | @ Detroit | W 85–82 | Carlos Booxer (21) | Carlos Boozer (15) | LeBron James (6) | The Palace of Auburn Hills; 22,076 | 19–29 |
| 49 | February 4 | L.A. Lakers | L 106–111 (OT) | LeBron James (32) | Carlos Boozer (16) | Carlos Boozer (7) | Gund Arena; 20,562 | 19–30 |
| 50 | February 6 | @ Minnesota | L 92–103 | Jeff McInnis (21) | James, Boozer (9) | James, McInnis (5) | Target Center; 19,212 | 19–31 |
| 51 | February 7 | Washington | L 88–106 | Carlos Boozer (19) | Zydrunas Ilgauskas (11) | LeBron James (6) | Gund Arena; 20,562 | 19–32 |
| 52 | February 9 | Boston | W 97–89 | LeBron James (24) | Zydrunas Ilgauskas (16) | Jeff McInnis (9) | Gund Arena; 15,146 | 20–32 |
| 53 | February 11 | New Jersey | L 85–105 | Eric Williams (14) | Zydrunas Ilgauskas (17) | McInnis, James (5) | Gund Arena; 15,074 | 20–33 |
| 54 | February 18 | Dallas | L 98–114 | Carlos Boozer (24) | Carlos Boozer (14) | LeBron James (9) | Gund Arena; 18,349 | 20–34 |
| 55 | February 20 | San Antonio | W 89–87 | LeBron James (32) | Zydrunas Ilgauskas (12) | Jeff McInnis (8) | Gund Arena; 20,562 | 21–34 |
| 56 | February 22 | @ New York | W 92–86 | Zydrunas Ilgauskas (31) | Carlos Boozer (17) | Jeff McInnis (4) | Madison Square Garden; 19,763 | 22–34 |
| 57 | February 23 | New Orleans | W 104–100 | Carlos Boozer (24) | Carlos Boozer (9) | Jeff McInnis (9) | Gund Arena; 17,093 | 23–34 |
| 58 | February 25 | @ Houston | L 84–90 | McInnins, Ilgauskas (17) | Carlos Boozer (18) | Jeff McInnis (10) | Toyota Center; 18,184 | 23–35 |
| 59 | February 27 | @ Orlando | W 112–107 (OT) | LeBron James (30) | Carlos Boozer (16) | Jeff McInnis (10) | TD Waterhouse Centre; 17,283 | 24–35 |

March : 8–7 (home: 5–3; road: 3–4)

| Game | Date | Team | Score | High points | High rebounds | High assists | Location Attendance | Record |
|---|---|---|---|---|---|---|---|---|
| 60 | March 1 | @ Chicago | L 81–92 | Zydrunas Ilgauskas (19) | Carlos Boozer (13) | Jeff McInnis (6) | United Center; 19,203 | 24–36 |
| 61 | March 3 | Atlanta | W 112–80 | LeBron James (24) | Carlos Boozer (15) | Jeff McInnis (9) | Gund Arena; 20,562 | 25–36 |
| 62 | March 5 | @ New Orleans | W 88–85 | LeBron James (19) | Eric Williams (11) | Jeff McInnis (11) | New Orleans Arena; 17,795 | 26–36 |
| 63 | March 6 | Milwaukee | W 106–97 | Zydrunas Ilgauskas (29) | Carlos Boozer (13) | Jeff McInnis (12) | Gund Arena; 20,562 | 27–36 |
| 64 | March 8 | @ Atlanta | W 108–102 | LeBron James (34) | Carlos Boozer (11) | Jeff McInnis (10) | Philips Arena; 14,050 | 28–36 |
| 65 | March 10 | @ Toronto | W 106–92 | Zydrunas Ilgauskas (30) | Carlos Boozer (13) | Jeff McInnis (7) | Air Canada Centre; 17,459 | 29–36 |
| 66 | March 14 | Indiana | W 107–104 | LeBron James (26) | Boozer, Ilgauskas (9) | Jeff McInnis (10) | Gund Arena; 20,562 | 30–36 |
| 67 | March 16 | Chicago | W 111–87 | Zydrunas Ilgauskas (24) | Zydrunas Ilgauskas (17) | LeBron James (8) | Gund Arena; 17,776 | 31–36 |
| 68 | March 19 | Utah | L 88–97 | Zydrunas Ilgauskas (24) | Carlos Boozer (13) | LeBron James (7) | Gund Arena; 20,562 | 31–37 |
| 69 | March 21 | Detroit | L 76–96 | Carlos Boozer (21) | Carlos Boozer (17) | Kevin Ollie (8) | Gund Arena; 20,562 | 31–38 |
| 70 | March 23 | Phoenix | L 86–103 | LeBron James (25) | Carlos Boozer (14) | LeBron James (6) | Gund Arena; 19,024 | 31–39 |
| 71 | March 26 | @ Philadelphia | L 71–86 | LeBron James (16) | Carlos Boozer (11) | LeBron James (7) | Wachovia Center; 20,804 | 31–40 |
| 72 | March 27 | New Jersey | W 107–104 | LeBron James (41) | Carlos Boozer (11) | LeBron James (13) | Gund Arena; 20,562 | 32–40 |
| 73 | March 29 | @ San Antonio | L 91–103 | James, Ilgauskas (18) | Ilgauskas, Diop (6) | Ollie, Battie (5) | SBC Center; 18,797 | 32–41 |
| 74 | March 30 | @ Dallas | L 109–126 | LeBron James (28) | Carlos Boozer (20) | James, Ollie, Cleaves (6) | American Airlines Center; 20,575 | 32–42 |

April : 3–5 (home: 2–2; road: 1–3)

| Game | Date | Team | Score | High points | High rebounds | High assists | Location Attendance | Record |
|---|---|---|---|---|---|---|---|---|
| 75 | April 2 | @ Milwaukee | L 89–107 | Carlos Boozer (26) | Carlos Boozer (11) | Mateen Cleaves (8) | Bradley Center; 17,813 | 32–43 |
| 76 | April 3 | Golden State | L 100–103 | LeBron James (34) | Carlos Boozer (13) | LeBron James (10) | Gund Arena; 20,562 | 32–44 |
| 77 | April 6 | Toronto | L 86–87 | LeBron James (21) | Boozer, Ilgauskas (15) | Jeff McInnis (10) | Gund Arena; 20,071 | 32–45 |
| 78 | April 7 | @ Memphis | L 74–92 | Dajuan Wagner (18) | Carlos Boozer (8) | Jeff McInnis (6) | Pyramid Arena; 19,351 | 32–46 |
| 79 | April 9 | @ Miami | L 91–106 | LeBron James (24) | James, Ilgauskas (7) | LeBron James (8) | American Airlines Arena; 20,213 | 32–47 |
| 80 | April 10 | Miami | W 91–80 | Jeff McInnis (16) | Carlos Boozer (14) | LeBron James (11) | Gund Arena; 20,562 | 33–47 |
| 81 | April 12 | Milwaukee | W 93–89 | LeBron James (27) | Zydrunas Ilgauskas (14) | LeBron James (9) | Gund Arena; 20,562 | 34–47 |
| 82 | April 14 | @ New York | W 100–90 | Jeff McInnis (19) | Carlos Boozer (12) | Jeff McInnis (7) | Madison Square Garden; 19,763 | 35–47 |

2003–04 schedule

== Player stats ==
Legend
| GP | Games played | GS | Games started | MPG | Minutes per game |
| FG% | Field-goal percentage | 3P% | 3-point field-goal percentage | FT% | Free-throw percentage |
| RPG | Rebounds per game | APG | Assists per game | SPG | Steals per game |
| BPG | Blocks per game | PPG | Points per game |

=== Regular season ===
| Player | GP | GS | MPG | FG% | 3P% | FT% | RPG | APG | SPG | BPG | PPG |
|---|---|---|---|---|---|---|---|---|---|---|---|
| Tony Battie* | 50 | 1 | 19.5 | .427 | .125 | .768 | 4.8 | .7 | .36 | .94 | 5.4 |
| Carlos Boozer | 75 | 75 | 34.6 | .523 | .167 | .768 | 11.4 | 2.0 | .99 | .73 | 15.5 |
| Kedrick Brown* | 34 | 16 | 16.5 | .465 | .388 | .643 | 2.3 | 1.1 | .38 | .15 | 5.3 |
| Mateen Cleaves | 4 | 2 | 23.0 | .304 | .000 | .500 | 1.8 | 4.8 | 1.00 | .50 | 3.8 |
| DeSagana Diop | 56 | 3 | 13.0 | .388 | .000 | .600 | 3.6 | .6 | .46 | .91 | 2.3 |
| Žydrūnas Ilgauskas | 81 | 81 | 31.3 | .483 | .286 | .746 | 8.1 | 1.3 | .48 | 2.48 | 15.3 |
| LeBron James | 79 | 79 | 39.5 | .417 | .290 | .754 | 5.5 | 5.9 | 1.65 | .73 | 20.9 |
| Jason Kapono | 41 | 3 | 10.4 | .403 | .477 | .833 | 1.3 | .3 | .32 | .05 | 3.5 |
| Jelani McCoy | 2 | 0 | 6.0 | .000 | .000 | .000 | 2.0 | .0 | .00 | .00 | .0 |
| Jeff McInnis* | 31 | 31 | 35.4 | .417 | .388 | .836 | 2.6 | 7.5 | 1.16 | .13 | 11.7 |
| Lee Nailon* | 22 | 4 | 18.0 | .451 | .000 | .800 | 3.0 | .8 | .18 | .05 | 7.7 |
| Ira Newble | 64 | 25 | 19.5 | .391 | .105 | .783 | 2.4 | 1.1 | .39 | .30 | 4.0 |
| Kevin Ollie | 82 | 7 | 17.1 | .370 | .444 | .835 | 2.1 | 2.9 | .62 | .10 | 4.2 |
| Dajuan Wagner | 44 | 4 | 16.1 | .366 | .360 | .681 | 1.3 | 1.2 | .59 | .16 | 6.5 |
| Eric Williams* | 50 | 36 | 27.5 | .366 | .253 | .787 | 3.8 | 1.9 | .96 | .16 | 9.4 |

* Statistics include only games with the Cavaliers

== Award winners ==
- LeBron James, Small Forward, Rookie of the Year
- LeBron James, Small Forward, NBA All-Rookie First Team
