= 2003–04 Orlando Magic season =

NBA professional basketball team season

- Head coach: Doc Rivers; Johnny Davis
- President: Bob Vander Weide
- General manager: John Gabriel
- Owner: Richard DeVos
- Arena: TD Waterhouse Centre

Results
- Record: 21–61 (.256)
- Place: Division: 7th (Atlantic); Conference: 15th (Eastern)
- Playoff finish: Did not qualify
- Stats at Basketball Reference

Local media
- Television: Sunshine Network, WBRW

The 2003–04 Orlando Magic season was the 15th season for the Orlando Magic in the National Basketball Association. During the offseason, the Magic signed free agents Juwan Howard and Tyronn Lue. Injuries hamstrung the Magic from the start of the season as Grant Hill missed the entire season recovering from ankle surgery, while Pat Garrity was lost after just two games with a knee injury. The Magic started the season with an 85–83 win on the road against the New York Knicks. However, their season would go straight down right after as they lost their next 19 games costing head coach Doc Rivers his job. With replacement Johnny Davis taking over, the Magic never recovered from their losing streak as they lost thirteen straight near the end of the season, finishing last place in the Atlantic Division with a league-worst 21–61 record, the franchise's worst record since 1991–92.

The season is notable for Tracy McGrady leading the league in scoring for the second straight time, averaging 28.0 points per game while being selected for the 2004 NBA All-Star Game. Following the season, McGrady requested a trade and was traded along with Howard, Lue and Reece Gaines to the Houston Rockets, and second-year forward Drew Gooden was dealt to the Cleveland Cavaliers.

The Magic unveiled new uniforms and wordmarks, retiring the set that was in place since 1998–99. They remained used until 2008.

== Draft picks ==
Round	Pick	Player	Position	Nationality	College / Club
1	15	Reece Gaines	F/G	United States	Louisville
2	42	Zaza Pachulia	F	Georgia	Ülkerspor (Turkey)

== Roster ==
2003–04 Orlando Magic roster
Players

Pos.	No.	Player	Height	Weight	DOB	From
SF	3	Keith Bogans	6 ft 5 in (1.96 m)	215 lb (98 kg)	1980-05-12	Kentucky
C	55	Andrew DeClercq	6 ft 10 in (2.08 m)	255 lb (116 kg)	1973-02-01	Florida
SG	13	Derrick Dial	6 ft 4 in (1.93 m)	184 lb (83 kg)	1975-12-20	Eastern Michigan
PG	22	Reece Gaines	6 ft 6 in (1.98 m)	205 lb (93 kg)	1981-01-07	Louisville
PF	8	Pat Garrity	6 ft 9 in (2.06 m)	238 lb (108 kg)	1976-08-23	Notre Dame
PF	0	Drew Gooden	6 ft 10 in (2.08 m)	250 lb (113 kg)	1977-06-20	Kansas
SF	33	Grant Hill	6 ft 8 in (2.03 m)	225 lb (102 kg)	1972-10-05	Duke
PF	5	Juwan Howard	6 ft 10 in (2.08 m)	250 lb (113 kg)	1973-02-07	Michigan
C	34	Steven Hunter	7 ft 0 in (2.13 m)	240 lb (109 kg)	1981-10-31	DePaul
C	31	Britton Johnsen	6 ft 10 in (2.08 m)	245 lb (111 kg)	1979-07-08	Utah
PG	10	Tyronn Lue	6 ft 0 in (1.83 m)	175 lb (79 kg)	1977-05-03	Nebraska
SG	1	Tracy McGrady	6 ft 8 in (2.03 m)	220 lb (100 kg)	1979-05-24	Mt. Zion HS (NC)
C	27	Zaza Pachulia	6 ft 11 in (2.11 m)	275 lb (125 kg)	1984-02-10	Republic of Georgia
C	45	Sean Rooks	6 ft 10 in (2.08 m)	250 lb (113 kg)	1969-09-09	Arizona
SF	9	DeShawn Stevenson	6 ft 5 in (1.96 m)	218 lb (99 kg)	1981-04-03	Washington Union HS (CA)

Coaches
Head coach
- Doc Rivers (fired)
- Johnny Davis
Assistant(s)
- Mark Hughes
- Paul Pressey
- Paul Westhead

Legend
- (DP) Unsigned draft pick
- (FA) Free agent
- (S) Suspended
- Injured

Roster
Updated: April 2, 2004

=== Roster notes ===
- Small forward Grant Hill missed the entire season due to an ankle injury.

== Regular season ==
=== Season standings ===
Atlantic Division	W	L	PCT	GB	Home	Road	Div
y-New Jersey Nets	47	35	.573	–	28–13	19–22	18–7
x-Miami Heat	42	40	.512	5	29–12	13–28	15–10
x-New York Knicks	39	43	.476	8	23–18	16–25	15–7
x-Boston Celtics	36	46	.439	11	19–22	17–24	14–10
e-Philadelphia 76ers	33	49	.402	14	21–20	12–29	10–14
e-Washington Wizards	25	57	.305	22	17–24	8–33	3–21
e-Orlando Magic	21	61	.256	26	11–30	10–31	8–16

#	Eastern Conference				
#	Team	W	L	PCT	GB
1	z-Indiana Pacers	61	21	.744	–
2	y-New Jersey Nets	47	35	.573	14
3	x-Detroit Pistons	54	28	.659	7
4	x-Miami Heat	42	40	.512	19
5	x-New Orleans Hornets	41	41	.500	20
6	x-Milwaukee Bucks	41	41	.500	20
7	x-New York Knicks	39	43	.476	22
8	x-Boston Celtics	36	46	.439	25
9	e-Cleveland Cavaliers	35	47	.427	26
10	e-Toronto Raptors	33	49	.402	28
11	e-Philadelphia 76ers	33	49	.402	28
12	e-Atlanta Hawks	28	54	.341	33
13	e-Washington Wizards	25	57	.305	36
14	e-Chicago Bulls	23	59	.280	38
15	e-Orlando Magic	21	61	.256	40

z – clinched division title
y – clinched division title
x – clinched playoff spot

== Player statistics ==
=== Regular season ===
Player	POS	GP	GS	MP	REB	AST	STL	BLK	PTS	MPG	RPG	APG	SPG	BPG	PPG
Juwan Howard	PF	81	77	2,877	570	158	54	22	1,376	35.5	7.0	2.0	.7	.3	17.0
Drew Gooden	PF	79	17	2,134	516	89	62	72	914	27.0	6.5	1.1	.8	.9	11.6
Tyronn Lue	PG	76	69	2,332	187	317	61	5	799	30.7	2.5	4.2	.8	.1	10.5
Keith Bogans	SF	73	36	1,787	317	98	46	10	498	24.5	4.3	1.3	.6	.1	6.8
Andrew DeClercq	C	71	53	1,211	317	44	47	32	230	17.1	4.5	.6	.7	.5	3.2
Tracy McGrady	SG	67	67	2,675	402	370	93	42	1,878	39.9	6.0	5.5	1.4	.6	28.0
Steven Hunter	C	59	23	789	170	12	5	73	187	13.4	2.9	.2	.1	1.2	3.2
Zaza Pachulia	C	59	2	664	174	13	21	12	194	11.3	2.9	.2	.4	.2	3.3
Gordan Giriček^{†}	SF	48	25	1,435	164	80	41	10	489	29.9	3.4	1.7	.9	.2	10.2
Rod Strickland^{†}	PG	46	9	915	118	185	27	7	311	19.9	2.6	4.0	.6	.2	6.8
Reece Gaines	PG	38	1	364	39	40	11	2	69	9.6	1.0	1.1	.3	.1	1.8
Shammond Williams^{†}	SG	37	2	525	43	64	23	1	183	14.2	1.2	1.7	.6	.0	4.9
DeShawn Stevenson^{†}	SF	26	24	933	120	66	24	1	291	35.9	4.6	2.5	.9	.0	11.2
Donnell Harvey^{†}	PF	24	1	345	72	8	10	11	98	14.4	3.0	.3	.4	.5	4.1
Britton Johnsen	C	20	4	290	45	12	7	1	42	14.5	2.3	.6	.4	.1	2.1
Sean Rooks^{†}	C	20	0	270	47	18	5	5	61	13.5	2.4	.9	.3	.3	3.1
Desmond Penigar	PF	10	0	89	24	3	2	2	32	8.9	2.4	.3	.2	.2	3.2
Derrick Dial	SG	9	0	86	13	2	6	0	26	9.6	1.4	.2	.7	.0	2.9
Lee Nailon^{†}	SF	8	0	83	14	4	1	0	29	10.4	1.8	.5	.1	.0	3.6
Pat Garrity	PF	2	0	22	0	1	0	0	2	11.0	.0	.5	.0	.0	1.0
Robert Archibald^{†}	PF	1	0	4	1	0	1	0	2	4.0	1.0	.0	1.0	.0	2.0

- ^{†} Denotes player spent time with another team in the season. Stats reflect time with the Magic only.

== Awards and honors ==
- Tracy McGrady – All-NBA 2nd Team, Scoring Champion, All-Star
