= Michael Stewart (basketball) =

American basketball player (born 1975)

Personal information
- Born: April 25, 1975 (age 51) Cucq-Trepied-Stella-Plage, France
- Listed height: 6 ft 10 in (2.08 m)
- Listed weight: 230 lb (104 kg)

Career information
- High school: John F. Kennedy (Sacramento, California)
- College: California (1993–1997)
- NBA draft: 1997: undrafted
- Playing career: 1997–2005
- Position: Power forward / center
- Number: 13, 4, 5, 44

Career history
- 1997–1998: Sacramento Kings
- 1999–2002: Toronto Raptors
- 2002–2003: Cleveland Cavaliers
- 2003–2005: Boston Celtics
- 2005: Atlanta Hawks
- Stats at NBA.com
- Stats at Basketball Reference

Michael Curtis "Yogi" Stewart (born April 24, 1975) is a French-born American former basketball player who last played for the Atlanta Hawks of the NBA.

== Early life ==
Stewart, son of former Santa Clara standout and European pro Mike Stewart, was born in Cucq, Pas-de-Calais, France and starred at Kennedy High School in Sacramento, California, leading the Cougars to back-to-back city section titles in 1990 and 1991.

Stewart earned his nickname "Yogi" from his older brother for his childhood love of Yogi Bear cartoons.

== College career ==
Stewart played four seasons at the University of California, Berkeley. He averaged 4.3 ppg and 4.7 rpg in 117 games and finished as the Bears' all-time leading shot-blocker (207). Stewart set a school record by blocking 59 shots as a freshman in 1993–94 and holds the four best single-season totals for blocks in school history. He never missed a game, playing in all 117 games during his collegiate career and shooting .510 from the field.

At the 1994 U.S. Olympic Festival, Stewart was a member of the bronze medal-winning West team.

== NBA career ==
Stewart went undrafted in the 1997 NBA draft, but was signed to a one-year contract by the Sacramento Kings on September 11, 1997. This was a dream come true for Stewart, as he had served as a ball boy for the Kings in his youth. As a rookie in 1997–98, he led the Kings in blocked shots and ranked second overall among NBA rookies. He also blocked nine shots in one game. On January 21, 1999, Stewart was signed as a free agent by the Toronto Raptors. During the ensuing offseason, he was re-signed to a six-year, $24 million contract by the team.

In 2002, Stewart was traded from the Raptors (along with a future first round pick) to the Cleveland Cavaliers in exchange for Lamond Murray.

In 2003, Stewart, Chris Mihm, Ricky Davis and a 2005 second-round draft pick were traded to the Boston Celtics for Kedrick Brown, Eric Williams, and Tony Battie. Stewart played sparingly for the Celtics, appearing in seventeen games before being traded at the 2005 trade deadline alongside Tom Gugliotta, Gary Payton and a 2006 first-round draft pick to the Atlanta Hawks for Antoine Walker. Stewart retired after the season.

== Career statistics ==
Legend
GP	Games played	GS	Games started	MPG	Minutes per game
FG%	Field goal percentage	3P%	3-point field goal percentage	FT%	Free throw percentage
RPG	Rebounds per game	APG	Assists per game	SPG	Steals per game
BPG	Blocks per game	PPG	Points per game	**Bold**	Career high

=== NBA ===
==== Regular season ====
Year	Team	GP	GS	MPG	FG%	3P%	FT%	RPG	APG	SPG	BPG	PPG
1997–98	Sacramento	**81**	**37**	**21.7**	.480	–	.458	**6.6**	**.8**	.4	**2.4**	**4.6**
1998–99	Toronto	42	2	9.4	.415	–	.680	2.4	.1	.1	.7	1.5
1999–00	Toronto	42	1	9.3	.377	–	.563	2.2	.1	.1	.5	1.4
2000–01	Toronto	26	0	4.7	.324	–	.611	1.1	.1	.2	.1	1.3
2001–02	Toronto	11	0	8.5	.348	.–	.545	2.3	.3	.4	.3	2.0
2002–03	Cleveland	47	0	5.3	.378	–	.667	1.2	.1	.0	.3	.8
2003–04	Cleveland	8	2	9.5	.429	–	**1.000**	2.3	.0	.1	1.0	1.0
2003–04	Boston	17	0	4.2	.400	–	.500	.6	.0	.1	.1	.3
2004–05	Atlanta	12	1	12.1	**.524**	–	.429	3.3	.4	**.5**	.4	2.1
Career		286	43	11.5	.442	–	.522	3.2	.3	.2	1.0	2.2

==== Playoffs ====
Year	Team	GP	GS	MPG	FG%	3P%	FT%	RPG	APG	SPG	BPG	PPG
2001	Toronto	**2**	0	2.0	.000	–	–	.5	.0	.0	.0	.0
2002	Toronto	1	0	**8.0**	**1.000**	–	–	**3.0**	.0	.0	**1.0**	**4.0**
2004	Boston	1	0	2.0	–	–	–	.0	.0	.0	.0	.0
Career		4	0	3.5	.667	–	–	1.0	.0	.0	.3	1.0
