= Tony Battie =

American basketball player

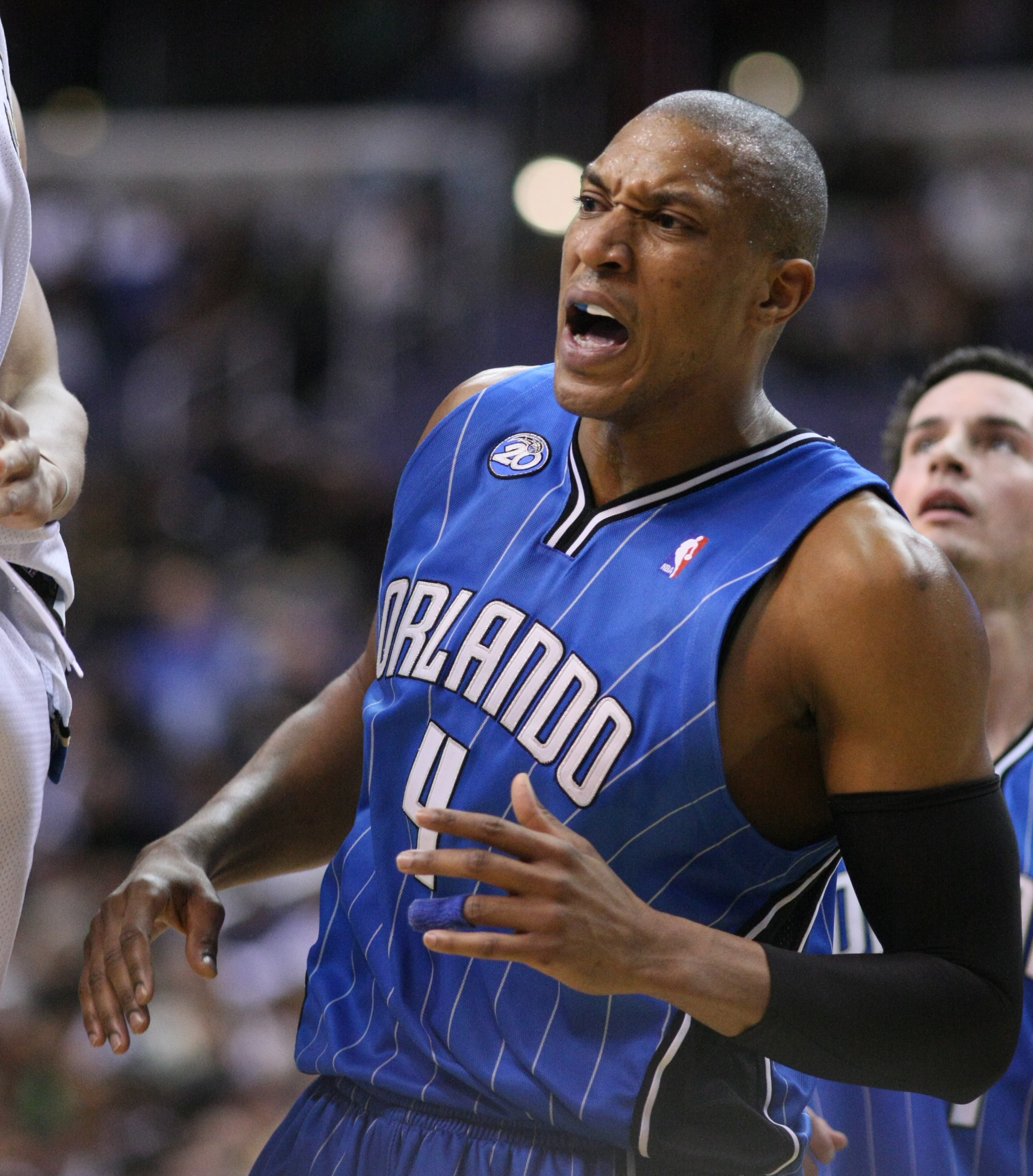
- Battie with the Orlando Magic in 2008

Personal information
- Born: February 11, 1976 (age 50) Dallas, Texas, U.S.
- Listed height: 6 ft 11 in (2.11 m)
- Listed weight: 240 lb (109 kg)

Career information
- High school: South Oak Cliff (Dallas, Texas)
- College: Texas Tech (1994–1997)
- NBA draft: 1997: 1st round, 5th overall pick
- Drafted by: Denver Nuggets
- Playing career: 1997–2012
- Position: Center / power forward
- Number: 4, 40, 7

Career history
- 1997–1998: Denver Nuggets
- 1999–2003: Boston Celtics
- 2003–2004: Cleveland Cavaliers
- 2004–2009: Orlando Magic
- 2009–2010: New Jersey Nets
- 2010–2012: Philadelphia 76ers

Career highlights
- First-team All-Big 12 (1997)

Career statistics
- Points: 5,082 (6.1 ppg)
- Rebounds: 4,287 (5.1 rpg)
- Blocks: 713 (0.9 bpg)
- Stats at NBA.com
- Stats at Basketball Reference

Demetrius Antonio Battie (born February 11, 1976) is an American former professional basketball player who played fifteen seasons in the National Basketball Association (NBA). He works as an analyst for the Orlando Magic. He played college basketball for the Texas Tech Red Raiders.

== High school and college career ==
Battie attended South Oak Cliff High School in Dallas winning a state championship in 1993. He played college basketball for the Texas Tech Red Raiders where he ended his career as the school all-time leader in blocked shots with 162 blocks. His best season, statistically, was in his junior year when he scored 18.8 points per game, 11.8 rebounds per game, and 2.5 blocks per game.

== NBA career ==
Battie was drafted fifth overall by the Denver Nuggets in the 1997 NBA draft, where he played one season. The Nuggets then traded him to Los Angeles Lakers along with Tyronn Lue for Nick Van Exel during the 1998 NBA draft. Battie, however, did not play for the Lakers due to the then-ongoing NBA lockout. In 1999, he was traded to the Boston Celtics for Travis Knight.

He remained with the Celtics for six years before he was traded to the Cleveland Cavaliers along with Eric Williams and Kedrick Brown in exchange for Ricky Davis, Chris Mihm, Michael Stewart, and a second-round pick. The following season The Cavaliers traded Battie to the Orlando Magic for Drew Gooden, Steven Hunter, and the Magic's second-round draft pick, Anderson Varejão.

On June 25, 2009, Battie was traded to the New Jersey Nets along with Rafer Alston and Courtney Lee in exchange for Vince Carter and Ryan Anderson. In July 2010 Battie signed a contract with Philadelphia 76ers as a free agent. He would spend the last two seasons with the 76ers before announcing his retirement.

== Personal life ==
In September 2000, Battie's then teammate, Paul Pierce, was stabbed at the Buzz Club, a late night dance club in the Boston Theater District; Battie and his brother saved Pierce by rushing him to a nearby hospital. After retiring, he moved back to Dallas. His nephew, Dawson Battie, is widely considered a top prospect in the high school class of 2027.

== NBA career statistics ==
Legend
GP	Games played	GS	Games started	MPG	Minutes per game
FG%	Field goal percentage	3P%	3-point field goal percentage	FT%	Free throw percentage
RPG	Rebounds per game	APG	Assists per game	SPG	Steals per game
BPG	Blocks per game	PPG	Points per game	**Bold**	Career high
*	Led the league

=== Regular season ===
Year	Team	GP	GS	MPG	FG%	3P%	FT%	RPG	APG	SPG	BPG	PPG
1997–98	Denver	65	49	23.2	.446	.214	.702	5.4	.9	**.8**	1.1	**8.4**
1998–99	Boston	50*	15	22.4	.519	.000	.672	6.0	**1.1**	.6	1.4	6.7
1999–00	Boston	**82**	4	18.4	.477	.125	.675	5.0	.8	.6	.9	6.6
2000–01	Boston	40	25	21.1	.537	.000	.638	5.8	.4	.7	**1.5**	6.5
2001–02	Boston	74	73	24.6	**.541**	.000	.413	**6.5**	.5	**.8**	.9	6.9
2002–03	Boston	67	62	25.1	.539	.200	.746	**6.5**	.7	.5	1.2	7.3
2003–04	Boston	23	6	21.8	.479	**1.000**	.697	5.1	.9	.3	.9	5.9
2003–04	Cleveland	50	1	19.5	.427	.125	.768	4.8	.7	.4	.9	5.4
2004–05	Orlando	81	32	23.4	.460	.000	.723	5.6	.5	.4	1.0	4.9
2005–06	Orlando	**82***	**82***	**27.0**	.507	.000	.664	5.6	.6	.6	.8	7.9
2006–07	Orlando	66	66	23.9	.489	.000	.675	5.2	.5	.4	.5	6.1
2008–09	Orlando	77	3	15.6	.489	.222	.659	3.6	.4	.3	.3	4.8
2009–10	New Jersey	15	0	8.9	.350	.250	.700	1.5	.2	.3	.1	2.4
2010–11	Philadelphia	38	0	9.9	.469	.667	.571	2.6	.3	.1	.4	2.6
2011–12	Philadelphia	27	11	10.9	.373	.000	**1.000**	2.5	.6	.1	.2	1.6
Career		837	429	21.1	.488	.162	.690	5.1	.6	.5	.9	6.1

=== Playoffs ===
Year	Team	GP	GS	MPG	FG%	3P%	FT%	RPG	APG	SPG	BPG	PPG
2002	Boston	16	**16**	**27.7**	.488	.000	**.619**	**7.6**	**.8**	**.6**	**1.9**	6.1
2003	Boston	10	10	21.3	**.564**	.000	.500	4.9	.5	.4	1.4	**6.6**
2007	Orlando	4	4	21.8	.389	.000	.250	4.0	.3	.0	.0	3.8
2009	Orlando	**21**	0	6.1	.467	.000	.600	1.0	.1	.0	.1	2.1
2011	Philadelphia	5	0	7.6	.429	.000	.500	2.0	.0	.0	.6	1.4
Career		56	30	16.2	.493	.000	.550	3.9	.4	.3	.9	4.1
