= 2003–04 Boston Celtics season =

Season of National Basketball Association team the Boston Celtics

- Head coach: Jim O'Brien; John Carroll (interim)
- General manager: Chris Wallace
- Owners: Boston Basketball Partners L.L.C.
- Arena: Fleet Center

Results
- Record: 36–46 (.439)
- Place: Division: 4th (Atlantic); Conference: 8th (Eastern)
- Playoff finish: First round (lost to Pacers 0–4)
- Stats at Basketball Reference

Local media
- Television: Fox Sports Net New England
- Radio: WWZN

The 2003–04 Boston Celtics season was the 58th season for the Boston Celtics in the National Basketball Association. During the offseason, the Celtics acquired Raef LaFrentz, a teammate of Paul Pierce from the University of Kansas, from the Dallas Mavericks. The Celtics roster move continued in December when Tony Battie and Eric Williams were both traded to the Cleveland Cavaliers for Ricky Davis. In February, Mike James was traded to the Detroit Pistons for Lindsey Hunter and Chucky Atkins in a three-team trade involving the Atlanta Hawks. However, Hunter was waived after the trade and later re-signed with the Pistons. The team also released Vin Baker, who signed as a free agent with the New York Knicks.

Celtics head coach Jim O'Brien resigned after a 22–24 start to the season. He was replaced by John Carroll for the remainder of the season. However, the Celtics would lose 12 of their first 13 games under Carroll. When General Manager Danny Ainge stated that the Celtics would be better off missing the playoffs, the statement seemed to motivate the team as they posted a 9–5 record in March. The Celtics, despite finishing fourth in the Atlantic Division with a low 36–46 record, qualified for the playoffs as the number 8 seed, making them the first NBA team to reach the playoffs with a below .500 record since the 1996–97 Los Angeles Clippers, who were swept by the Utah Jazz that postseason. They were swept in four games by the Indiana Pacers in the opening round. Pierce was selected for the 2004 NBA All-Star Game. Following the season, Carroll was fired as coach and replaced by Doc Rivers, who also fired by the Orlando Magic after 1–10 start.

Neither of the Celtics' home playoff games against Indiana sold out, an increasingly rare occurrence among any NBA playoff teams by the 2000s. The team only drew over 17,300 to Game 3 and about 16,400 to Game 4, thousands of tickets below the FleetCenter's capacity of 18,624. (In fact, neither did Indiana, who only drew as high as 17,000 to Game 2.)

== Draft picks ==
Round	Pick	Player	Position	Nationality	College
1	16	Troy Bell (traded to Memphis)	PG	United States	Boston College
1	20	Dahntay Jones (traded to Memphis)	SG	United States	Duke
2	56	Brandon Hunter	PF	United States	Ohio

== Roster ==
2003–04 Boston Celtics roster
Players

Pos.	No.	Player	Height	Weight	DOB	From
PG	7	Chucky Atkins	5 ft 11 in (1.80 m)	160 lb (73 kg)	1974–08–14	South Florida
PG	11	Marcus Banks	6 ft 2 in (1.88 m)	200 lb (91 kg)	1981–11–19	UNLV
SG	13	Dana Barros	5 ft 11 in (1.80 m)	163 lb (74 kg)	1967–04–13	Boston College
C	30	Mark Blount	7 ft 0 in (2.13 m)	230 lb (104 kg)	1975–11–30	Pittsburgh
SF	12	Ricky Davis	6 ft 6 in (1.98 m)	195 lb (88 kg)	1979–09–23	Iowa
PF	56	Brandon Hunter	6 ft 7 in (2.01 m)	260 lb (118 kg)	1980–11–24	Ohio
SG	20	Jumaine Jones	6 ft 8 in (2.03 m)	218 lb (99 kg)	1979–02–10	Georgia
C	45	Raef LaFrentz	6 ft 11 in (2.11 m)	240 lb (109 kg)	1976–05–29	Kansas
PF	0	Walter McCarty	6 ft 10 in (2.08 m)	230 lb (104 kg)	1974–02–01	Kentucky
C	4	Chris Mihm	7 ft 0 in (2.13 m)	265 lb (120 kg)	1979–07–16	Texas
C	43	Kendrick Perkins	6 ft 10 in (2.08 m)	270 lb (122 kg)	1984–11–10	Clifton J. Ozen HS (TX)
G/F	34	Paul Pierce	6 ft 7 in (2.01 m)	235 lb (107 kg)	1977–10–13	Kansas
C	5	Michael Stewart	6 ft 10 in (2.08 m)	230 lb (104 kg)	1975–04–25	California
SG	44	Jiří Welsch	6 ft 7 in (2.01 m)	208 lb (94 kg)	1980–01–27	Czech Republic

Coaches
Head coach
- Jim O'Brien
- John Carroll (interim)
Assistant(s)
- John Carroll
- Lester Conner
- Joe Gallagher
- Dick Harter
- Frank Vogel

Legend
- (DP) Unsigned draft pick
- (FA) Free agent
- (S) Suspended
- Injured

Roster
Updated: 2004–02–19

== Regular season ==
=== Season standings ===
Atlantic Division	W	L	PCT	GB	Home	Road	Div
y-New Jersey Nets	47	35	.573	–	28–13	19–22	18–7
x-Miami Heat	42	40	.512	5	29–12	13–28	15–10
x-New York Knicks	39	43	.476	8	23–18	16–25	15–7
x-Boston Celtics	36	46	.439	11	19–22	17–24	14–10
e-Philadelphia 76ers	33	49	.402	14	21–20	12–29	10–14
e-Washington Wizards	25	57	.305	22	17–24	8–33	3–21
e-Orlando Magic	21	61	.256	26	11–30	10–31	8–16

#	Eastern Conference				
#	Team	W	L	PCT	GB
1	z-Indiana Pacers	61	21	.744	–
2	y-New Jersey Nets	47	35	.573	14
3	x-Detroit Pistons	54	28	.659	7
4	x-Miami Heat	42	40	.512	19
5	x-New Orleans Hornets	41	41	.500	20
6	x-Milwaukee Bucks	41	41	.500	20
7	x-New York Knicks	39	43	.476	22
8	x-Boston Celtics	36	46	.439	25
9	e-Cleveland Cavaliers	35	47	.427	26
10	e-Toronto Raptors	33	49	.402	28
11	e-Philadelphia 76ers	33	49	.402	28
12	e-Atlanta Hawks	28	54	.341	33
13	e-Washington Wizards	25	57	.305	36
14	e-Chicago Bulls	23	59	.280	38
15	e-Orlando Magic	21	61	.256	40

== Playoffs ==
2004 playoff game log
First Round: 0–4 (home: 0–2; road: 0–2)

Game	Date	Team	Score	High points	High rebounds	High assists	Location Attendance	Series
1	April 17	@ Indiana	L 88–104	Paul Pierce (20)	Paul Pierce (10)	three players tied (4)	Conseco Fieldhouse; 16,605	0–1
2	April 20	@ Indiana	L 90–103	Paul Pierce (27)	Mark Blount (10)	Chucky Atkins (6)	Conseco Fieldhouse; 17,347	0–2
3	April 23	Indiana	L 85–108	Ricky Davis (16)	Mark Blount (8)	Ricky Davis (7)	FleetCenter; 17,680	0–3
4	April 25	Indiana	L 75–90	Paul Pierce (27)	Mark Blount (13)	Walter McCarty (5)	FleetCenter; 16,389	0–4

2004 schedule

== Player statistics ==
Legend
GP	Games played	GS	Games started	MPG	Minutes per game
FG%	Field-goal percentage	3P%	3-point field-goal percentage	FT%	Free-throw percentage
RPG	Rebounds per game	APG	Assists per game	SPG	Steals per game
BPG	Blocks per game	PPG	Points per game

=== Regular season ===
Boston Celtics statistics
Player	GP	GS	MPG	FG%	3P%	FT%	RPG	APG	SPG	BPG	PPG
Chucky Atkins^{†}	24	24	33.0	.418	.351	.778	1.9	5.3	1.1	.0	12.0
Vin Baker^{†}	37	33	27.0	.505	.000	.732	5.7	1.5	.6	.6	11.3
Marcus Banks	81	2	17.1	.400	.314	.756	1.6	2.2	1.1	.2	5.9
Dana Barros	1	0	11.0	.667		1.000	.0	.0	.0	.0	6.0
Tony Battie^{†}	23	6	21.8	.479	1.000	.697	5.1	.9	.3	.9	5.9
Mark Blount	82	73	29.3	.566		.719	7.2	.9	1.0	1.3	10.3
Kedrick Brown^{†}	21	10	19.4	.455	.375	.615	3.2	1.2	.8	.1	5.2
Ricky Davis^{†}	57	5	29.4	.488	.380	.732	4.2	2.6	1.2	.2	14.1
Brandon Hunter	36	12	11.3	.457	.000	.442	3.3	.5	.4	.0	3.5
Mike James^{†}	55	55	30.6	.418	.381	.800	3.2	4.4	1.3	.0	10.7
Jumaine Jones	42	2	8.9	.344	.295	.609	1.6	.3	.3	.2	2.2
Raef LaFrentz	17	1	19.3	.460	.200	.769	4.6	1.4	.5	.8	7.8
Walter McCarty	77	23	24.7	.388	.374	.756	3.1	1.6	.9	.3	7.9
Chris Mihm^{†}	54	16	17.4	.500		.644	5.1	.2	.5	.8	6.1
Kendrick Perkins	10	0	3.5	.533		.667	1.4	.3	.0	.2	2.2
Paul Pierce	80	80	38.7	.402	.299	.819	6.5	5.1	1.6	.7	23.0
Michael Stewart^{†}	17	0	4.2	.400		.500	.6	.0	.1	.1	.3
Jiří Welsch	81	68	26.9	.428	.381	.743	3.7	2.3	1.2	.1	9.2
Eric Williams^{†}	21	0	24.4	.435	.344	.716	4.5	1.2	1.0	.0	11.6

=== Playoffs ===
Boston Celtics statistics
Player	GP	GS	MPG	FG%	3P%	FT%	RPG	APG	SPG	BPG	PPG
Chucky Atkins	4	4	33.3	.436	.300	.895	3.5	3.8	.8	.0	13.5
Marcus Banks	4	0	15.0	.438	.400	1.000	1.8	1.8	.5	.3	5.0
Dana Barros	1	0	1.0	.000			.0	.0	.0	.0	.0
Mark Blount	4	4	36.3	.486		.737	9.3	1.0	1.5	2.0	12.0
Ricky Davis	4	0	30.8	.400	.400	.688	3.0	3.5	.5	.0	11.8
Brandon Hunter	3	0	3.3	1.000			1.0	.3	.0	.3	.7
Jumaine Jones	2	0	14.0	.333	.000		2.5	1.0	.0	.0	2.0
Walter McCarty	4	4	31.8	.478	.400		5.3	2.0	.5	.5	7.0
Chris Mihm	4	0	16.3	.318		.600	4.5	.0	1.0	1.0	5.0
Paul Pierce	4	4	40.5	.342	.294	.839	8.8	2.5	1.3	1.0	20.8
Michael Stewart	1	0	2.0				.0	.0	.0	.0	.0
Jiří Welsch	4	4	26.0	.478	.250	1.000	3.0	2.3	.5	.0	8.0

- ^{†} Denotes player spent time with another team in the season. Stats reflect time with the Celtics only.

== Transactions ==
=== Trades ===
July 29, 2003	To Cleveland Cavaliers J. R. Bremer; Bruno Šundov; 2005 second-round pick	To Boston Celtics Jumaine Jones

October 20, 2003	To Dallas Mavericks Tony Delk; Antoine Walker	To Boston Celtics Raef LaFrentz; Chris Mills; Jiří Welsch; 2004 first-round pick

December 15, 2003	To Cleveland Cavaliers Tony Battie; Kedrick Brown; Eric Williams	To Boston Celtics Ricky Davis; Chris Mihm; Michael Stewart; 2005 second-round pick

February 19, 2004	To Boston Celtics Chucky Atkins (From Detroit); Lindsey Hunter (From Detroit); 2004 first-round pick (From Detroit)	To Atlanta Hawks Chris Mills (From Boston); Željko Rebrača (From Detroit); Bob Sura (From Detroit); 2004 first-round pick (From Detroit) To Detroit Pistons Mike James (From Boston); Rasheed Wallace (From Atlanta)

=== Free agents ===
Additions
Player	Date signed	Former team
Mike James	July 25	Miami Heat

Subtractions
Player	Date signed	New Team
Vin Baker	February 18	New York Knicks
Lindsey Hunter	February 25	Detroit Pistons

== See also ==
- 2003–04 NBA season
