= Justin Reed =

American basketball player (1982–2017)

Personal information
- Born: January 16, 1982 Jackson, Mississippi, U.S.
- Died: October 20, 2017 (aged 35) Jackson, Mississippi, U.S.
- Listed height: 6 ft 8 in (2.03 m)
- Listed weight: 240 lb (109 kg)

Career information
- High school: Provine (Jackson, Mississippi)
- College: Ole Miss (2000–2004)
- NBA draft: 2004: 2nd round, 40th overall pick
- Drafted by: Boston Celtics
- Playing career: 2004–2009
- Position: Power forward / small forward
- Number: 9

Career history
- 2004–2006: Boston Celtics
- 2006–2007: Minnesota Timberwolves
- 2007–2008: Austin Toros
- 2008–2009: Bakersfield Jam

Career highlights
- First-team All-SEC (2004); SEC Rookie of the Year (2001); Fourth-team Parade All-American (2000)
- Stats at NBA.com
- Stats at Basketball Reference
Medals
Men's basketball
Representing United States
Summer Universiade
Bronze medal – third place	2001 Beijing	Team competition

Justin Michael Reed (January 16, 1982 – October 20, 2017) was an American professional basketball player, who played at the small forward position.

== College career ==
Reed led the University of Mississippi's Ole Miss Rebels as part of the "Provine Posse", three former Provine High School teammates (along with Aaron Harper and David Sanders) who played together for the Rebels.

Under the tutelage of 2001 Naismith Coach of the Year Rod Barnes, Reed became an all-around player and a dominant force in the Southeastern Conference. An All-SEC selection in each of his four years at The University of Mississippi, Reed led the team both on the court and in the locker room. As a freshman, Reed guided the Rebels through two NCAA tournament wins en route to a first ever "Sweet Sixteen" appearance for the Ole Miss program in 2001.

== NBA career ==
Following his successful career as a forward at the University of Mississippi, Reed was selected in the second round (40th overall) by the Boston Celtics in the 2004 NBA draft. Following one and one-half seasons with little playing time, he was traded to the Minnesota Timberwolves on January 26, 2006, in a multi-player deal; he enjoyed a successful 40 games with the Timberwolves and, at season's end, became a restricted free agent. Minnesota then rewarded him with a three-year contract worth $4,310,500.

On June 14, 2007, it was officially announced that Reed and teammate Mike James would be traded to the Houston Rockets, for Juwan Howard. He was subsequently waived by the Rockets without having appeared in a single game for them.

== Death ==
Reed died from angiosarcoma, a cancer of the vasculature, on October 20, 2017.
