= John Carroll (basketball) =

American basketball player and coach

Personal information
- Born: November 5, 1955 (age 71)

Career information
- High school: Summit (Summit, New Jersey)
- College: Dickinson (1973–1977)
- NBA draft: 1977: undrafted
- Coaching career: 1979–2004, 2018–2020

Career history

Coaching
- 1979–1982: Bloomfield
- 1982–1989: Seton Hall (assistant)
- 1989–1995: Duquesne
- 1997–2004: Boston Celtics (assistant)
- 2004: Boston Celtics
- 2018–2019: Rhode Island (assistant)
- 2019–2020: Rhode Island (special assistant)

Career highlights
- As head coach: Atlantic 10 Coach of the Year (1991)

John Carroll (born November 8, 1955) is an American basketball coach who last served as an assistant coach for the University of Rhode Island men's basketball team. He was the head coach for the Boston Celtics of the National Basketball Association (NBA), during the latter part of the 2003–04 season, temporarily replacing Jim O'Brien, who had resigned. At the end of the season he was replaced as head coach by Doc Rivers.

== Playing career ==
A point guard at Summit High School in Summit, New Jersey, Carroll captained his senior team to the New Jersey state championship. Carroll was a four-year starter at Dickinson College in Carlisle, Pennsylvania, where he earned a degree in psychology in 1977.

== Coaching career ==
Carroll was the head basketball coach at Bloomfield College in Bloomfield, New Jersey from 1979 to 1982. The Deacons were 42–38 under Carroll and advanced to the NAIA District Finals twice in three seasons. He went on to become an assistant coach at Seton Hall University under P. J. Carlesimo for seven seasons before becoming the head basketball coach for Duquesne University from 1989 to 1995. He compiled a 73–98 career record with one winning season, in 1993–94, when the Dukes went 17–13 overall and 8–8 in the Atlantic 10 Conference. They earned a trip to the National Invitation Tournament (NIT), where they beat UNC Charlotte in the first round but lost to Villanova in second round. Carroll was the Atlantic 10 Coach of the Year for the 1990–91 season after leading the Dukes to a 10–8 conference record.

Carroll now coaches for the New England Playaz AAU program.

== Head coaching record ==
Legend
Regular season	G	Games coached	W	Games won	L	Games lost	W–L %	Win–loss %
Playoffs	PG	Playoff games	PW	Playoff wins	PL	Playoff losses	PW–L %	Playoff win–loss %

Team	Year	G	W	L	W–L%	Finish	PG	PW	PL	PW–L%	Result
Boston	2003–04	36	14	22	.389	4th in Atlantic	4	0	4	.000	Lost in First Round
Career		36	14	22	.389		4	0	4	.000	
