= Chris Mihm =

American basketball player (born 1979)

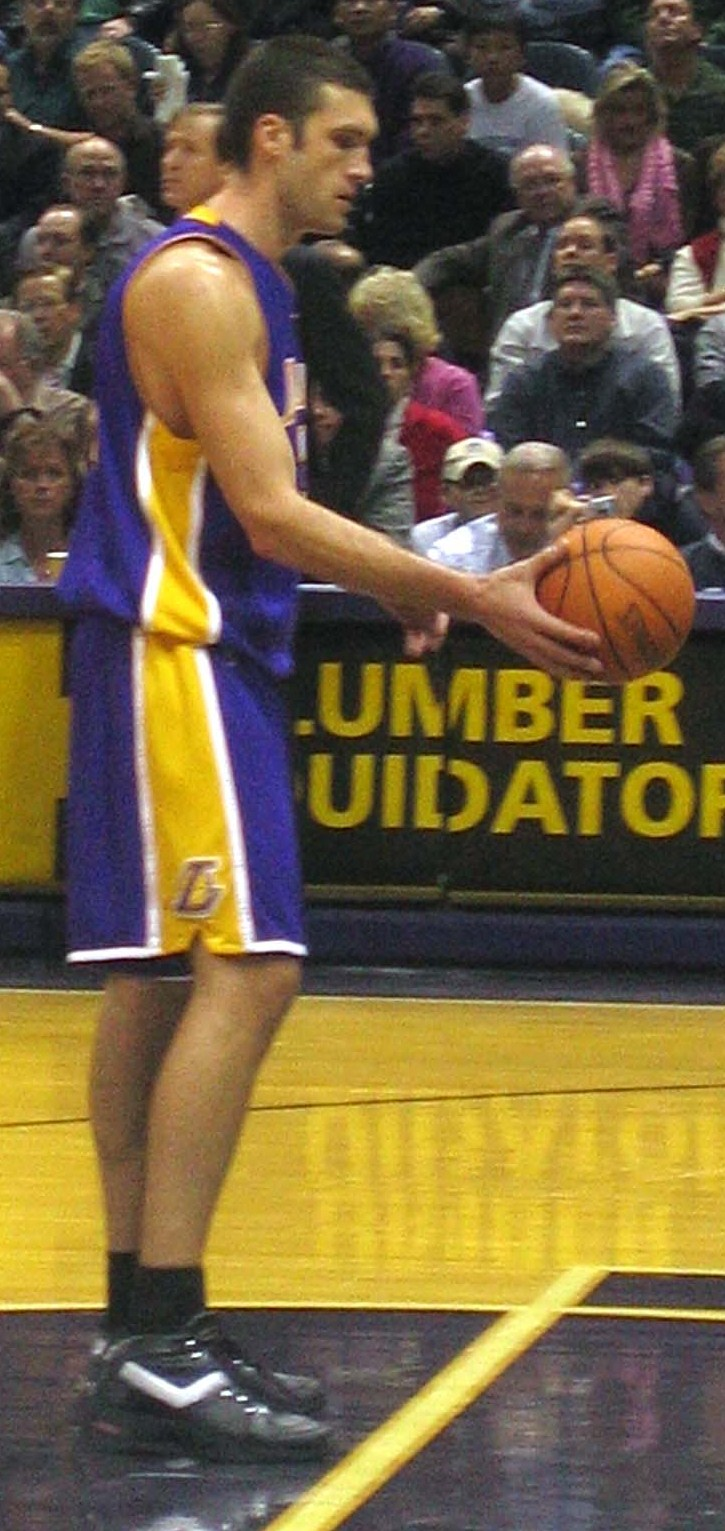
- Mihm with the Los Angeles Lakers in 2005

Personal information
- Born: July 16, 1979 (age 47) Milwaukee, Wisconsin, U.S.
- Listed height: 7 ft 0 in (2.13 m)
- Listed weight: 265 lb (120 kg)

Career information
- High school: Westlake (Austin, Texas)
- College: Texas (1997–2000)
- NBA draft: 2000: 1st round, 7th overall pick
- Drafted by: Chicago Bulls
- Playing career: 2000–2009
- Position: Center
- Number: 4, 31

Career history
- 2000–2003: Cleveland Cavaliers
- 2003–2004: Boston Celtics
- 2004–2009: Los Angeles Lakers

Career highlights
- NBA All-Rookie Second Team (2001); Consensus first-team All-American (2000); 2× First-team All-Big 12 (1999, 2000); 2× Big 12 All-Defensive Team (1999, 2000); Big 12 All-Freshman Team (1998); Third-team Parade All-American (1997)

Career NBA statistics
- Points: 3,262 (7.5 ppg)
- Rebounds: 2,302 (5.3 rpg)
- Blocks: 444 (1.0 bpg)
- Stats at NBA.com
- Stats at Basketball Reference
Medals
Men's basketball
Representing United States
Summer Universiade
| Gold medal – first place | 1999 Palma | Team competition |

Christopher Steven Mihm (born July 16, 1979) is an American former professional basketball player who played nine seasons in the National Basketball Association (NBA). After playing college basketball for the Texas Longhorns, the center was drafted with the seventh overall pick in the 2000 NBA draft by the Chicago Bulls.

== Early life ==
Mihm was born in Milwaukee, Wisconsin, to Gary and Nina Mihm and later moved to Texas. At the age of 14, he was ranked among Texas' top tennis players in his age group. His opponents included future US Open champion Andy Roddick and NFL quarterback Drew Brees, both of whom resided in the area.

== College career ==
Mihm played his college basketball at the University of Texas at Austin, where he was one of the top players in school history. In 2021, he ranked first on UT's all-time blocks list (264), second in double-doubles (47), and fourth in rebounds (945).

=== Freshman season ===
In the summer before his freshman year, Mihm spent time working out with San Antonio Spurs center David Robinson.

== NBA career ==
=== Cleveland Cavaliers (2000–2003) ===
Mihm was picked seventh overall by the Chicago Bulls but was then traded to the Cleveland Cavaliers for Jamal Crawford. Mihm's debut game was played on October 31, 2000, in an 86–82 victory over the New Jersey Nets, where he played for three minutes and only recorded one block, one turnover and one foul.

During his rookie season, he started 43 of 59 games for the Cavs, but injuries caused him to miss the other 23. Mihm played 27 games before recording an assist. In his 28th game on February 19, 2001, Mihm recorded the first assist of his career in a 85–84 win over the Bulls. Mihm stayed with the Cavaliers for the first 3 1/2 seasons of his career, playing a total of 207 games for the club and averaging 7.1 points and 5.0 rebounds.

=== Boston Celtics (2004) ===
On December 15, 2003, Mihm was traded along with teammates Ricky Davis, Michael Stewart and a 2005 2nd-round draft pick to the Boston Celtics for Tony Battie, Kedrick Brown and Eric Williams. Mihm would only play for the Celtics for the remainder of the 2004–05 season, averaging 6.1 points and 5.1 rebounds in 54 games.

=== Los Angeles Lakers (2004–2009) ===
Mihm signed a three-year, $11 million contract via a sign and trade, along with Chucky Atkins and Jumaine Jones to the Los Angeles Lakers in exchange for Rick Fox, Gary Payton and a 2006 1st-round draft pick. Mihm would finish out his career with the Lakers although he did miss the entire 2006–07 season due to ankle injury. His best season with the team was the 2005–06 season right before his injury, where he averaged 10.2 points and 6.3 rebounds while starting in 56 of the 59 games he played.

=== Memphis Grizzlies (2009) ===
Mihm was traded to the Grizzlies for a failed conditional 2013 second-round pick, on February 18, 2009. The pick would have gone to the Lakers had the Grizzlies' pick fell below the 55th selection, however, the pick was at the 55th selection, so it wasn't transferred. He never played a game with the Grizzlies and his previous team (Lakers) would go on to win 2009 NBA Finals by defeating the Orlando Magic in five games.

Mihm's time with the Lakers ended up being the last playing days of his NBA career as his final game was played on February 17, 2009 (the day before he was traded to Memphis). In his final game, the Lakers defeated the Atlanta Hawks 96–83 with Mihm recording four points, seven rebounds and two blocks.

== Career statistics ==
Legend
| GP | Games played | GS | Games started | MPG | Minutes per game |
| FG% | Field goal percentage | 3P% | 3-point field goal percentage | FT% | Free throw percentage |
| RPG | Rebounds per game | APG | Assists per game | SPG | Steals per game |
| BPG | Blocks per game | PPG | Points per game | **Bold** | Career high |

=== NBA ===
==== Regular season ====
| Year | Team | GP | GS | MPG | FG% | 3P% | FT% | RPG | APG | SPG | BPG | PPG |
|---|---|---|---|---|---|---|---|---|---|---|---|---|
| 2000–01 | Cleveland | 59 | 43 | 19.8 | .442 | .000 | .794 | 4.7 | .3 | .3 | .9 | 7.6 |
| 2001–02 | Cleveland | 74 | 60 | 22.4 | .420 | **.429** | .693 | 5.3 | .3 | .2 | 1.2 | 7.7 |
| 2002–03 | Cleveland | 52 | 0 | 15.6 | .404 | .000 | .724 | 4.4 | .5 | .3 | .7 | 5.9 |
| 2003–04 | Cleveland | 22 | 1 | 17.8 | .465 | .000 | .708 | 6.4 | .5 | .4 | 1.0 | 6.9 |
| 2003–04 | Boston | 54 | 16 | 17.4 | .500 | .000 | .644 | 5.1 | .2 | **.5** | .8 | 6.1 |
| 2004–05 | L.A. Lakers | **75** | **75** | 24.9 | **.507** | .000 | .678 | **6.7** | .7 | .2 | **1.4** | 9.8 |
| 2005–06 | L.A. Lakers | 59 | 56 | **26.1** | .501 | .000 | .716 | 6.3 | **1.0** | .3 | 1.2 | **10.2** |
| 2007–08 | L.A. Lakers | 23 | 5 | 12.1 | .337 | .000 | .667 | 3.3 | .6 | .2 | .6 | 3.6 |
| 2008–09 | L.A. Lakers | 18 | 0 | 5.8 | .375 | .000 | **.857** | 1.9 | .6 | .1 | .3 | 2.0 |
| Career | | 436 | 256 | 20.1 | .459 | .231 | .704 | 5.3 | .5 | .3 | 1.0 | 7.5 |

==== Playoffs ====
| Year | Team | GP | GS | MPG | FG% | 3P% | FT% | RPG | APG | SPG | BPG | PPG |
|---|---|---|---|---|---|---|---|---|---|---|---|---|
| 2004 | Boston | **4** | 0 | **16.3** | **.318** | .000 | **.600** | **4.5** | .0 | **1.0** | **1.0** | **5.0** |
| 2008 | L.A. Lakers | 1 | 0 | 3.0 | .000 | .000 | .000 | .0 | .0 | .0 | .0 | .0 |
| Career | | 5 | 0 | 13.6 | .304 | .000 | .600 | 3.6 | .0 | .8 | .8 | 4.0 |

=== College ===
| Year | Team | GP | GS | MPG | FG% | 3P% | FT% | RPG | APG | SPG | BPG | PPG |
|---|---|---|---|---|---|---|---|---|---|---|---|---|
| 1997–98 | Texas | 31 | 28 | 24.8 | .514 | .182 | .647 | 8.0 | .5 | **.4** | **2.9** | 12.4 |
| 1998–99 | Texas | 32 | 32 | **32.1** | .449 | .000 | .683 | **11.0** | .6 | **.4** | 2.6 | 13.7 |
| 1999–2000 | Texas | **33** | **33** | 30.7 | **.523** | **.467** | **.707** | 10.5 | **.7** | .3 | 2.7 | **17.7** |
| Career | | 96 | 93 | 29.3 | .497 | .300 | .684 | 9.8 | .6 | .4 | 2.8 | 14.6 |
