= 2003–04 New York Knicks season =

Season of National Basketball Association team the New York Knicks

- Head coach: Don Chaney (fired); Herb Williams (interim); Lenny Wilkens
- General manager: Scott Layden; Isiah Thomas
- Owners: Cablevision
- Arena: Madison Square Garden

Results
- Record: 39–43 (.476)
- Place: Division: 3rd (Atlantic); Conference: 7th (Eastern)
- Playoff finish: First round (lost to Nets 0–4)
- Stats at Basketball Reference

Local media
- Television: MSG Network
- Radio: WFAN

The 2003–04 New York Knicks season was the 58th season for the Knicks in the National Basketball Association (NBA). During the offseason, the Knicks signed All-Star center Dikembe Mutombo in free agency. The Knicks started the season by losing seven of their first nine games as fans at the Garden chanted "Fire Layden", in reference to general manager Scott Layden. Knicks fans would get their wish as Layden was fired and replaced by former Detroit Pistons star Isiah Thomas.

In January, the Knicks traded Antonio McDyess and Charlie Ward to the Phoenix Suns for All-Star guard Stephon Marbury and Penny Hardaway. Ward was released by the Suns, and later signed as a free agent with the San Antonio Spurs. At midseason, Thomas made more moves, trading Keith Van Horn to the Milwaukee Bucks for Tim Thomas. After a 15–24 start, the Knicks fired head coach Don Chaney, and played one game under assistant Herb Williams before signing Lenny Wilkens as their new coach. With a 39–43 record, which placed them third in the Atlantic Division, the Knicks qualified for the NBA playoffs as the seventh seed in the Eastern Conference. Allan Houston averaged 18.5 points per game, but played just 50 games due to injury.

In the first round of the playoffs, the Knicks were swept in four games by the New Jersey Nets. New York did not return to the playoffs until the 2010–11 season. Following the season, Mutombo was traded to the Chicago Bulls, who then dealt him to the Houston Rockets. Longtime Knicks play-by-play announcer Marv Albert was not retained by the MSG Network, having criticized poor play by the team on-air. He remained an NBA on TNT broadcaster until he retired from NBA broadcasting following the 2020–21 season.

== NBA draft ==
Round	Pick	Player	Position	Nationality	School/Club team
1	9	Michael Sweetney	F	United States	Georgetown
2	30	Maciej Lampe	F	Poland	Complutense University of Madrid (Spain)

== Roster ==
2003–04 New York Knicks roster
Players

Pos.	No.	Player	Height	Weight	DOB	From
SG	49	Shandon Anderson	6 ft 6 in (1.98 m)	208 lb (94 kg)	1973-12-31	Georgia
PF	42	Vin Baker	6 ft 11 in (2.11 m)	232 lb (105 kg)	1971-11-23	Hartford
SG	1	Penny Hardaway	6 ft 7 in (2.01 m)	195 lb (88 kg)	1971-07-18	Memphis
PF	32	Othella Harrington (injured)	6 ft 9 in (2.06 m)	235 lb (107 kg)	1974-01-31	Georgetown
SG	20	Allan Houston (injured)	6 ft 6 in (1.98 m)	205 lb (93 kg)	1971-04-20	Tennessee
SF	4	DerMarr Johnson	6 ft 9 in (2.06 m)	201 lb (91 kg)	1980-05-05	Cincinnati
PG	3	Stephon Marbury	6 ft 2 in (1.88 m)	205 lb (93 kg)	1977-02-20	Georgia Tech
C	13	Nazr Mohammed	6 ft 10 in (2.08 m)	250 lb (113 kg)	1977-09-05	Kentucky
C	55	Dikembe Mutombo	7 ft 2 in (2.18 m)	260 lb (118 kg)	1966-06-25	Georgetown
PG	25	Moochie Norris	6 ft 1 in (1.85 m)	175 lb (79 kg)	1973-07-27	West Florida
PF	50	Mike Sweetney	6 ft 8 in (2.03 m)	295 lb (134 kg)	1982-10-25	Georgetown
PF	40	Kurt Thomas	6 ft 9 in (2.06 m)	240 lb (109 kg)	1972-10-04	TCU
SF	5	Tim Thomas	6 ft 10 in (2.08 m)	240 lb (109 kg)	1977-02-26	Villanova
C	14	Cezary Trybański (injured)	7 ft 2 in (2.18 m)	235 lb (107 kg)	1979-09-22	Poland
PG	30	Frank Williams	6 ft 3 in (1.91 m)	212 lb (96 kg)	1980-02-25	Illinois

Coaches
Head coach
- Don Chaney (fired)
- Herb Williams (interim)
- Lenny Wilkens
Assistant(s)
- Mark Aguirre
- Greg Brittenham
- George Glymph
- Dick Helm
- Lon Kruger
- Brendan Malone
- Michael Malone

Legend
- (DP) Unsigned draft pick
- (FA) Free agent
- (S) Suspended
- Injured

Roster
Updated: March 12, 2004

== Regular season ==
=== Season standings ===
Atlantic Division	W	L	PCT	GB	Home	Road	Div
y-New Jersey Nets	47	35	.573	–	28–13	19–22	18–7
x-Miami Heat	42	40	.512	5	29–12	13–28	15–10
x-New York Knicks	39	43	.476	8	23–18	16–25	15–7
x-Boston Celtics	36	46	.439	11	19–22	17–24	14–10
e-Philadelphia 76ers	33	49	.402	14	21–20	12–29	10–14
e-Washington Wizards	25	57	.305	22	17–24	8–33	3–21
e-Orlando Magic	21	61	.256	26	11–30	10–31	8–16

#	Eastern Conference				
#	Team	W	L	PCT	GB
1	z-Indiana Pacers	61	21	.744	–
2	y-New Jersey Nets	47	35	.573	14
3	x-Detroit Pistons	54	28	.659	7
4	x-Miami Heat	42	40	.512	19
5	x-New Orleans Hornets	41	41	.500	20
6	x-Milwaukee Bucks	41	41	.500	20
7	x-New York Knicks	39	43	.476	22
8	x-Boston Celtics	36	46	.439	25
9	e-Cleveland Cavaliers	35	47	.427	26
10	e-Toronto Raptors	33	49	.402	28
11	e-Philadelphia 76ers	33	49	.402	28
12	e-Atlanta Hawks	28	54	.341	33
13	e-Washington Wizards	25	57	.305	36
14	e-Chicago Bulls	23	59	.280	38
15	e-Orlando Magic	21	61	.256	40

== Playoffs ==
2004 playoff game log
First Round: 0–4 (home: 0–2; road: 0–2)

Game	Date	Team	Score	High points	High rebounds	High assists	Location Attendance	Series
1	April 17	@ New Jersey	L 83–107	Penny Hardaway (18)	Stephon Marbury (5)	Shandon Anderson (5)	Continental Airlines Arena; 18,206	0–1
2	April 20	@ New Jersey	L 81–99	Stephon Marbury (23)	Kurt Thomas (12)	Penny Hardaway (10)	Continental Airlines Arena; 19,918	0–2
3	April 22	New Jersey	L 78–81	three players tied (18)	Kurt Thomas (12)	Stephon Marbury (10)	Madison Square Garden; 19,763	0–3
4	April 25	New Jersey	L 94–100	Stephon Marbury (31)	Kurt Thomas (15)	Stephon Marbury (7)	Madison Square Garden; 19,763	0–4

2004 schedule

== Player statistics ==
Legend
GP	Games played	GS	Games started	MPG	Minutes per game
FG%	Field-goal percentage	3P%	3-point field-goal percentage	FT%	Free-throw percentage
RPG	Rebounds per game	APG	Assists per game	SPG	Steals per game
BPG	Blocks per game	PPG	Points per game

=== Regular season ===
Player	GP	GS	MPG	FG%	3P%	FT%	RPG	APG	SPG	BPG	PPG
Shandon Anderson	80	37	24.7	.422	.281	.764	2.8	1.5	.9	.2	7.9
Vin Baker^{†}	17	0	18.4	.404	.500	.711	4.1	.7	.4	.5	6.6
Michael Doleac^{†}	46	0	14.9	.444		.861	4.1	.7	.4	.7	5.0
Howard Eisley^{†}	33	23	22.1	.396	.329	.889	2.0	4.7	.9	.1	6.7
Penny Hardaway^{†}	42	4	29.0	.390	.364	.775	4.5	1.9	1.0	.3	9.6
Othella Harrington	56	3	15.6	.495		.744	3.2	.5	.2	.3	4.6
Allan Houston	50	50	36.0	.435	.431	.913	2.4	2.0	.8	.0	18.5
DerMarr Johnson	21	1	13.7	.371	.361	.903	1.9	.5	.4	.3	5.4
Stephon Marbury^{†}	47	47	39.1	.431	.321	.833	3.1	9.3	1.4	.1	19.8
Antonio McDyess^{†}	18	6	23.4	.458		.579	6.6	1.1	.7	.6	8.4
Nazr Mohammed^{†}	27	23	24.9	.563		.525	7.7	.6	1.2	.9	9.1
Dikembe Mutombo	65	56	23.0	.478		.681	6.7	.4	.3	1.9	5.6
Moochie Norris^{†}	36	0	12.4	.408	.343	.766	1.0	2.0	.8	.1	4.3
Bruno Šundov^{†}	1	0	4.0	1.000			.0	1.0	.0	.0	2.0
Michael Sweetney	42	1	11.8	.493	.000	.724	3.7	.3	.4	.3	4.3
Kurt Thomas	80	75	31.9	.473	.000	.835	8.3	1.9	.7	1.0	11.1
Tim Thomas^{†}	24	23	31.1	.452	.406	.813	4.8	1.4	1.0	.2	15.8
Cezary Trybański^{†}	3	0	1.7	.000		.500	.0	.0	.3	.0	.3
Keith Van Horn^{†}	47	47	33.5	.445	.373	.819	7.3	1.8	1.1	.4	16.4
Charlie Ward^{†}	35	10	23.6	.442	.428	.762	2.7	4.9	1.3	.2	8.7
Clarence Weatherspoon^{†}	15	1	14.4	.450		.947	3.3	.9	.5	.1	3.6
Frank Williams	56	3	12.8	.385	.300	.854	.9	2.2	.4	.1	3.9

=== Playoffs ===
Player	GP	GS	MPG	FG%	3P%	FT%	RPG	APG	SPG	BPG	PPG
Shandon Anderson	4	4	29.3	.259	.286	.500	2.3	2.8	1.0	.3	4.3
Vin Baker	4	0	14.3	.571		.667	3.0	.3	.8	.5	5.5
Penny Hardaway	4	3	42.0	.365	.357	.833	4.5	5.8	1.5	.3	16.5
DerMarr Johnson	3	0	5.7	.000	.000		.7	.7	.0	.3	.0
Stephon Marbury	4	4	43.5	.373	.300	.680	4.3	6.5	1.8	.0	21.3
Nazr Mohammed	4	4	24.3	.500		.688	5.8	.3	1.5	.8	10.3
Dikembe Mutombo	3	0	12.7	.333		1.000	3.3	.0	.3	1.3	2.3
Michael Sweetney	4	0	14.3	.545		.667	2.5	.0	.0	.3	4.0
Kurt Thomas	4	4	34.8	.429		.750	11.5	1.5	1.8	.8	12.8
Tim Thomas	1	1	22.0	.400	.000	.800	5.0	3.0	.0	.0	12.0
Frank Williams	4	0	18.5	.273	.308	.600	.5	1.3	.8	.0	4.8

- ^{†} Denotes player spent time with another team in the season. Stats reflect time with the Knicks only.
