= Bob Sura =

American basketball player (born 1973)

Personal information
- Born: March 25, 1973 (age 53) Wilkes-Barre, Pennsylvania, U.S.
- Listed height: 6 ft 5 in (1.96 m)
- Listed weight: 200 lb (91 kg)

Career information
- High school: G.A.R. Memorial (Wilkes-Barre, Pennsylvania)
- College: Florida State (1991–1995)
- NBA draft: 1995: 1st round, 17th overall pick
- Drafted by: Cleveland Cavaliers
- Playing career: 1995–2007
- Position: Shooting guard / point guard
- Number: 3, 5

Career history
- 1995–2000: Cleveland Cavaliers
- 2000–2003: Golden State Warriors
- 2003–2004: Detroit Pistons
- 2004: Atlanta Hawks
- 2004–2007: Houston Rockets

Career highlights
- First-team All-ACC (1994); 2× Second-team All-ACC (1993, 1995); ACC Rookie of the Year (1992); No. 3 jersey honored by Florida State Seminoles

Career NBA statistics
- Points: 5,654 (8.6 ppg)
- Rebounds: 2,240 (3.4 rpg)
- Assists: 2,474 (3.8 apg)
- Stats at NBA.com
- Stats at Basketball Reference

Robert Sura Jr. (born March 25, 1973) is an American World Series of Poker player and former professional basketball player who played ten seasons for five different teams in the National Basketball Association (NBA). At 6 ft 5 in (1.96 m), 200 pounds (91 kg), he played as a shooting guard and point guard.

In his retirement from basketball, Sura has competed professionally several World Series of Poker tournaments. In 2024, Sura made it to the Day 3 Main Event, the furthest he had advanced in six previous events.

== Early life and college career ==
Born in Wilkes-Barre, Pennsylvania, Robert Sura played in high school at G.A.R. Memorial. He had a game high of 69 while leading G.A.R. to a streak of 86 consecutive league victories.

After high school, Sura played basketball for Florida State University, playing on the same team as fellow NBA players Charlie Ward and Sam Cassell. Sura holds the all-time scoring record at Florida State with 2,130 points.

Sura was named the ACC Rookie of the Year his freshman year at Florida State (1991–92).

== NBA career ==
Sura was drafted 17th overall by the Cleveland Cavaliers in the 1995 NBA draft. His best season with the Cavaliers was his last, as he averaged 13.8 points per game during the 1999-2000 season. He was then traded to the Golden State Warriors, and has also played for the Detroit Pistons, Atlanta Hawks and Houston Rockets.

With the Hawks, he gained attention by almost posting three straight triple-double games—the third was subsequently taken away from him by the league when he purposely missed a layup to get his 10th rebound. The NBA defines a field goal attempt as attempting to put the basketball in the basket for a field goal. Since he had no intention to put the basketball in the basket, he could not be credited with a rebound.

Sura competed in the 3-point tournament during All-Star Weekend as well as the Slam Dunk competition.

Sura is the all-time leading scorer at Florida State, which retired his jersey in 2007.

Throughout the 2005-06 NBA season and 2006-07 NBA season Sura was on injured reserve.

On October 29, 2007, Sura was cut by the Rockets.

Sura has appeared in the PokerStars series The Big Game.

== NBA career statistics ==
Legend
GP	Games played	GS	Games started	MPG	Minutes per game
FG%	Field goal percentage	3P%	3-point field goal percentage	FT%	Free throw percentage
RPG	Rebounds per game	APG	Assists per game	SPG	Steals per game
BPG	Blocks per game	PPG	Points per game	**Bold**	Career high
*	Led the league

=== Regular season ===
Year	Team	GP	GS	MPG	FG%	3P%	FT%	RPG	APG	SPG	BPG	PPG
1995–96	Cleveland	79	3	14.6	.411	.346	.702	1.7	2.9	.7	.3	5.3
1996–97	Cleveland	**82**	23	27.7	.431	.323	.614	3.8	4.8	1.1	**.4**	9.2
1997–98	Cleveland	46	4	20.5	.377	.317	.565	2.0	3.7	1.0	.2	5.8
1998–99	Cleveland	50*	6	16.8	.333	.200	.631	2.0	3.0	.9	.3	4.3
1999–00	Cleveland	73	45	30.4	**.437**	**.367**	.697	3.9	3.9	**1.2**	.3	13.8
2000–01	Golden State	53	42	31.7	.390	.273	.714	4.3	4.6	1.0	.2	11.1
2001–02	Golden State	78	5	22.9	.424	.316	.720	3.3	3.5	1.1	.2	10.0
2002–03	Golden State	55	0	20.5	.412	.329	.696	3.0	3.2	.8	.0	7.3
2003–04	Detroit	53	0	13.3	.410	.250	.696	1.9	1.7	.7	.2	3.8
2003–04	Atlanta	27	18	**35.4**	.420	.279	**.783**	**8.3**	**5.3**	.9	.2	**14.7**
2004–05	Houston	61	**59**	31.5	.427	.355	.750	5.5	5.2	1.1	.1	10.3
Career		657	205	23.7	.414	.325	.689	3.4	3.8	1.0	.2	8.6

=== Playoffs ===
Year	Team	GP	GS	MPG	FG%	3P%	FT%	RPG	APG	SPG	BPG	PPG
1996	Cleveland	3	0	6.0	**.667**	–	–	.3	1.0	.3	.0	1.3
1998	Cleveland	3	0	10.3	.200	.000	**.667**	1.0	1.3	.3	.0	1.3
2005	Houston	**7**	**7**	**26.1**	.435	**.538**	**.667**	**3.9**	**2.0**	**1.0**	.0	**7.9**
Career		13	7	17.8	.426	.467	.667	2.4	1.6	.7	.0	4.8
