= 2003–04 Indiana Pacers season =

NBA professional basketball team season

- Division champions
- Head coach: Rick Carlisle
- General manager: Larry Bird
- Arena: Conseco Fieldhouse

Results
- Record: 61–21 (.744)
- Place: Division: 1st (Central); Conference: 1st (Eastern)
- Playoff finish: Eastern Conference finals (lost to Pistons 2–4)
- Stats at Basketball Reference

Local media
- Television: Fox Sports Net Midwest, WTTV
- Radio: WIBC

The 2003–04 Indiana Pacers season was the Pacers' 28th season in the National Basketball Association, and 37th season as a franchise. During the offseason, former Pacers head coach Larry Bird was named President of Basketball Operations. One of Bird's first moves in his new position was to fire head coach Isiah Thomas, after Thomas had led the Pacers to first-round playoff exits for three consecutive years. The defensive-minded Rick Carlisle, former head coach of the Detroit Pistons, was announced as Thomas' replacement. Also during the offseason, the Pacers acquired Scot Pollard from the Sacramento Kings in a three-team trade and signed free agent Kenny Anderson.

The Pacers got off to a fast start winning 14 of their first 16 games, and finished the season with a record of 61–21, which was worthy of the Eastern Conference first seed in the playoffs, guaranteed home-court advantage throughout the playoffs for the first time since 2000, and a new all-time franchise-best win–loss record. Jermaine O'Neal was named to the All-NBA Second Team, the first Pacer ever to do so, and even finished third in the MVP voting, which was the highest in the voting any Pacers player had ever reached. Ron Artest was named to the NBA All-Defensive First Team, and also was named Defensive Player of the Year, the first Pacer ever to receive this award. Both O'Neal and Artest were selected for the 2004 NBA All-Star Game, with Carlisle coaching the Eastern Conference. Second-year guard Fred Jones won the Slam Dunk Contest during the All-Star Weekend in Los Angeles.

In the first round of the playoffs, the Pacers swept the 8th-seeded Boston Celtics 4–0. They proceeded to defeat the 4th-seeded Miami Heat 4–2 in the second round, earning the Pacers their sixth spot in the Eastern Conference finals in 11 years. The Pacers fell 2–4 in the Eastern Conference finals to the eventual NBA champions, the 3rd-seeded Detroit Pistons, who were coached by former Pacers coach Larry Brown. Following the season, Al Harrington was traded to the Atlanta Hawks, while Anderson went along with him signing as a free agent with the Hawks.

== NBA draft ==
Round	Pick	Player	Position	Nationality	College
2	49	James Jones	SF	United States	Miami

== Roster ==
Indiana Pacers roster
Players

Pos.	No.	Player	Height	Weight	DOB	From
PG	13	Kenny Anderson	6 ft 0 in (1.83 m)	168 lb (76 kg)	1970-10-09	Georgia Tech
SF	23	Ron Artest	6 ft 7 in (2.01 m)	244 lb (111 kg)	1979-11-13	St. John's
SF	24	Jonathan Bender	6 ft 11 in (2.11 m)	202 lb (92 kg)	1981-01-30	Picayune Memorial HS (MS)
PG	2	Jamison Brewer	6 ft 4 in (1.93 m)	184 lb (83 kg)	1980-11-19	Auburn
C	27	Primož Brezec	7 ft 2 in (2.18 m)	252 lb (114 kg)	1979-10-02	Slovenia
PF	44	Austin Croshere	6 ft 9 in (2.06 m)	235 lb (107 kg)	1975-05-01	Providence
C	10	Jeff Foster	6 ft 11 in (2.11 m)	250 lb (113 kg)	1977-01-16	Texas State
PF	3	Al Harrington	6 ft 9 in (2.06 m)	230 lb (104 kg)	1980-02-17	St. Patrick HS (NJ)
PG	8	Anthony Johnson	6 ft 3 in (1.91 m)	190 lb (86 kg)	1974-10-02	College of Charleston
SG	20	Fred Jones	6 ft 4 in (1.93 m)	210 lb (95 kg)	1979-03-11	Oregon
SF	33	James Jones	6 ft 8 in (2.03 m)	215 lb (98 kg)	1980-10-04	Miami (FL)
SG	31	Reggie Miller	6 ft 7 in (2.01 m)	185 lb (84 kg)	1965-08-24	UCLA
PF	7	Jermaine O'Neal	6 ft 11 in (2.11 m)	260 lb (118 kg)	1978-10-13	Eau Claire HS (SC)
C	62	Scot Pollard	6 ft 11 in (2.11 m)	278 lb (126 kg)	1975-02-12	Kansas
PG	11	Jamaal Tinsley	6 ft 3 in (1.91 m)	195 lb (88 kg)	1978-02-28	Iowa State

Coaches
Head coach
- (United States) Rick Carlisle (Virginia)

Legend
- (DP) Unsigned draft pick
- (FA) Free agent
- (S) Suspended
- Injured

Roster
Updated: 2004–03–10

== Regular season ==
=== Season standings ===
Central Division	W	L	PCT	GB	Home	Road	Div
y-Indiana Pacers	61	21	.744	–	34–7	27–14	20–8
x-Detroit Pistons	54	28	.659	7	31–10	23–18	17–11
x-New Orleans Hornets	41	41	.500	20	25–16	16–25	14–14
x-Milwaukee Bucks	41	41	.500	20	27–14	14–27	15–13
e-Cleveland Cavaliers	35	47	.427	26	23–18	12–29	14–14
e-Toronto Raptors	33	49	.402	28	18–23	15–26	11–17
e-Atlanta Hawks	28	54	.341	33	18–23	10–31	10–18
e-Chicago Bulls	23	59	.280	38	14–27	9–32	11–17

#	Eastern Conference				
#	Team	W	L	PCT	GB
1	z-Indiana Pacers	61	21	.744	–
2	y-New Jersey Nets	47	35	.573	14
3	x-Detroit Pistons	54	28	.659	7
4	x-Miami Heat	42	40	.512	19
5	x-New Orleans Hornets	41	41	.500	20
6	x-Milwaukee Bucks	41	41	.500	20
7	x-New York Knicks	39	43	.476	22
8	x-Boston Celtics	36	46	.439	25
9	e-Cleveland Cavaliers	35	47	.427	26
10	e-Toronto Raptors	33	49	.402	28
11	e-Philadelphia 76ers	33	49	.402	28
12	e-Atlanta Hawks	28	54	.341	33
13	e-Washington Wizards	25	57	.305	36
14	e-Chicago Bulls	23	59	.280	38
15	e-Orlando Magic	21	61	.256	40

== Playoffs ==
2004 playoff game log
First round: 4–0 (home: 2–0; road: 2–0)

Game	Date	Team	Score	High points	High rebounds	High assists	Location Attendance	Series
1	April 17	Boston	W 104–88	O'Neal, Artest (24)	Jermaine O'Neal (11)	Jamaal Tinsley (7)	Conseco Fieldhouse; 16,605	1–0
2	April 20	Boston	W 103–90	Jermaine O'Neal (22)	Al Harrington (13)	Reggie Miller (7)	Conseco Fieldhouse; 17,347	2–0
3	April 23	@ Boston	W 108–85	Harrington, Bender (19)	O'Neal, Foster (7)	Ron Artest (5)	FleetCenter; 17,680	3–0
4	April 25	@ Boston	W 90–75	Ron Artest (22)	Foster, Harrington (7)	Jamaal Tinsley (7)	FleetCenter; 16,389	4–0

Conference Semi-finals: 4–2 (home: 3–0; road: 1–2)

Game	Date	Team	Score	High points	High rebounds	High assists	Location Attendance	Series
1	May 6	Miami	W 94–81	Ron Artest (25)	Jeff Foster (10)	Jamaal Tinsley (5)	Conseco Fieldhouse; 18,345	1–0
2	May 8	Miami	W 91–80	Ron Artest (20)	Harrington, O'Neal (9)	Jamaal Tinsley (9)	Conseco Fieldhouse; 18,345	2–0
3	May 10	@ Miami	L 87–94	Jermaine O'Neal (29)	Jermaine O'Neal (9)	Jamaal Tinsley (5)	American Airlines Arena; 20,115	2–1
4	May 12	@ Miami	L 88–100	Jermaine O'Neal (37)	Artest, Tinsley (8)	Jamaal Tinsley (5)	American Airlines Arena; 20,128	2–2
5	May 15	Miami	W 94–83	Jermaine O'Neal (22)	Jeff Foster (16)	Jamaal Tinsley (8)	Conseco Fieldhouse; 18,345	3–2
6	May 18	@ Miami	W 73–70	Ron Artest (27)	Jermaine O'Neal (13)	Jamaal Tinsley (3)	American Airlines Arena; 20,136	4–2

Conference finals: 2–4 (home: 1–2; road: 1–2)

Game	Date	Team	Score	High points	High rebounds	High assists	Location Attendance	Series
1	May 22	Detroit	W 78–74	Jermaine O'Neal (21)	Jermaine O'Neal (14)	Jamaal Tinsley (5)	Conseco Fieldhouse; 18,345	1–0
2	May 24	Detroit	L 67–72	Reggie Miller (21)	Jeff Foster (9)	Anthony Johnson (4)	Conseco Fieldhouse; 18,345	1–1
3	May 26	@ Detroit	L 78–85	Jermaine O'Neal (24)	Jermaine O'Neal (9)	Jamaal Tinsley (4)	The Palace of Auburn Hills; 22,076	1–2
4	May 28	@ Detroit	W 83–68	Ron Artest (20)	Jermaine O'Neal (13)	Jamaal Tinsley (5)	The Palace of Auburn Hills; 22,076	2–2
5	May 30	Detroit	L 65–83	Artest, Jones (13)	Ron Artest (11)	Jamaal Tinsley (5)	Conseco Fieldhouse; 18,345	2–3
6	June 1	@ Detroit	L 65–69	Jermaine O'Neal (20)	Artest, O'Neal (10)	Anthony Johnson (7)	The Palace of Auburn Hills; 22,076	2–4

2004 schedule

== Player statistics ==
=== Regular season ===
Player	POS	GP	GS	MP	REB	AST	STL	BLK	PTS	MPG	RPG	APG	SPG	BPG	PPG
Jeff Foster	C	82	79	1,961	610	64	71	27	497	23.9	7.4	.8	.9	.3	6.1
Fred Jones	SG	81	2	1,508	126	173	65	18	397	18.6	1.6	2.1	.8	.2	4.9
Reggie Miller	SG	80	80	2,254	188	249	65	11	800	28.2	2.4	3.1	.8	.1	10.0
Al Harrington	PF	79	15	2,441	508	131	80	22	1,048	30.9	6.4	1.7	1.0	.3	13.3
Jermaine O'Neal	PF	78	78	2,788	778	164	59	199	1,566	35.7	10.0	2.1	.8	2.6	20.1
Austin Croshere	PF	77	0	1,051	243	52	24	14	387	13.6	3.2	.7	.3	.2	5.0
Ron Artest	SF	73	71	2,714	385	272	152	50	1,333	37.2	5.3	3.7	2.1	.7	18.3
Anthony Johnson	PG	73	7	1,598	130	202	64	8	450	21.9	1.8	2.8	.9	.1	6.2
Scot Pollard	C	61	3	678	164	10	23	26	106	11.1	2.7	.2	.4	.4	1.7
Jamaal Tinsley	PG	52	43	1,378	136	303	84	17	432	26.5	2.6	5.8	1.6	.3	8.3
Kenny Anderson	PG	44	31	905	81	125	26	5	262	20.6	1.8	2.8	.6	.1	6.0
Jonathan Bender	SF	21	0	271	40	9	5	11	148	12.9	1.9	.4	.2	.5	7.0
Primož Brezec	C	18	0	72	15	3	0	3	28	4.0	.8	.2	.0	.2	1.6
Jamison Brewer	PG	13	1	160	11	17	7	0	32	12.3	.8	1.3	.5	.0	2.5
James Jones	SF	6	0	26	2	0	1	0	7	4.3	.3	.0	.2	.0	1.2

=== Playoffs ===
Player	POS	GP	GS	MP	REB	AST	STL	BLK	PTS	MPG	RPG	APG	SPG	BPG	PPG
Jermaine O'Neal	PF	16	16	604	146	19	8	36	307	37.8	9.1	1.2	.5	2.3	19.2
Reggie Miller	SG	16	16	455	37	45	18	3	161	28.4	2.3	2.8	1.1	.2	10.1
Jamaal Tinsley	PG	16	16	422	46	80	28	3	129	26.4	2.9	5.0	1.8	.2	8.1
Jeff Foster	C	16	13	307	105	12	13	5	58	19.2	6.6	.8	.8	.3	3.6
Al Harrington	PF	16	2	427	102	12	23	9	152	26.7	6.4	.8	1.4	.6	9.5
Anthony Johnson	PG	16	0	332	34	34	13	4	73	20.8	2.1	2.1	.8	.3	4.6
Jonathan Bender	SF	16	0	200	28	7	2	14	77	12.5	1.8	.4	.1	.9	4.8
Ron Artest	SF	15	15	584	98	48	21	16	276	38.9	6.5	3.2	1.4	1.1	18.4
Fred Jones	SG	14	0	263	33	16	7	7	66	18.8	2.4	1.1	.5	.5	4.7
Austin Croshere	PF	13	2	214	40	12	4	3	63	16.5	3.1	.9	.3	.2	4.8
Kenny Anderson	PG	4	0	19	1	1	1	0	4	4.8	.3	.3	.3	.0	1.0
Scot Pollard	C	3	0	13	4	0	1	0	2	4.3	1.3	.0	.3	.0	.7

== Transactions ==
=== Additions ===
Player	Acquired	Former team	Position
Kenny Anderson	Signed as free agent	New Orleans Hornets	PG
Danny Ferry	Trade	San Antonio Spurs	PF
Anthony Johnson	Signed as free agent	New Jersey Nets	PG
James Jones	Draft selection	rookie	SF
Scot Pollard	Trade	Sacramento Kings	C

=== Subtractions ===
Player	Departed	New team	Position
Danny Ferry	Waived	none	PF
Tim Hardaway	Retired	none	PG
Ron Mercer	Trade	San Antonio Spurs	SF
Brad Miller	Trade	Sacramento Kings	C
Erick Strickland	Signed as free agent	Milwaukee Bucks	PG

== Awards and records ==
- Ron Artest – NBA Defensive Player of the Year Award, All-NBA Third Team, All-Star Game, NBA All-Defensive First Team
- Rick Carlisle – East All-Star Team Game Head Coach
- Jermaine O'Neal – All-NBA Second Team, All-Star Game
