= 2003–04 New Orleans Hornets season =

- Head coach: Tim Floyd
- General manager: Bob Bass
- Owner(s): George Shinn, Ray Wooldridge
- Arena: New Orleans Arena

Results
- Record: 41–41 (.500)
- Place: Division: 3rd (Central); Conference: 5th (Eastern)
- Playoff finish: First round (lost to Heat 3–4)
- Stats at Basketball Reference

Local media
- Television: Cox Sports Television
- Radio: WTIX

The 2003–04 NBA season was the Hornets' second season in the National Basketball Association. Originally reckoned as the 16th season of the franchise, the second incarnation of the Charlotte Hornets' reclaiming the heritage of the original Hornets has since retroactively deemed this season as the 2nd season for the franchise that would eventually become the Pelicans. During the offseason, the Hornets signed free agent Steve Smith. Despite losing Jamal Mashburn for the first 44 games due to a knee injury, the Hornets got off to a solid 17–7 start to the season under new head coach Tim Floyd. However, they would struggle posting a losing record in January, and only managed to play .500 ball in February. Mashburn would return to play just 19 games averaging 20.8 points per game, but then re-injured his knee sitting out the rest of the season. The Hornets struggled losing 11 of their 16 games in March, but would rebound in April winning 4 of 7 games.

Despite posting an average record of 41–41, the Hornets finished fifth in the Eastern Conference, and qualified for their fifth straight playoff appearance. This was also the team's final season in the NBA's Eastern Conference. Baron Davis was again hampered by injuries and he played just 67 games. Despite another injury-plagued season, Davis and teammate Jamaal Magloire both represented the Eastern Conference at the 2004 NBA All-Star Game in Los Angeles.

In the playoffs, they faced the Miami Heat in the first round, but lost in seven games. Following the season, the Hornets moved to the new Southwest Division of the NBA's Western Conference. Also following the season, Floyd was fired as coach after just one season, Smith left in the 2004 NBA expansion draft, Stacey Augmon signed as a free agent with the Orlando Magic, and Robert Traylor re-signed with the Cleveland Cavaliers.

== Draft picks ==
Round	Pick	Player	Position	Nationality	School/Club team
1	18	David West	PF	United States	Xavier
2	48	James Lang	C	United States	Central Park Christian HS (Birmingham, Alabama)

The team entered the draft with one first-round pick and one second-round pick, marking their first selections as the New Orleans Hornets. While the team debuted in New Orleans the previous year after relocating from Charlotte, they had entered that year's draft without any picks due to previous trades. Under the 2014 franchise agreement, which returned all pre-2002 records to Charlotte, this year officially stands as the first year with draft selections in the history of the franchise that would become the Pelicans.

== Roster ==
2003–04 New Orleans Hornets roster
Players

Pos.	No.	Player	Height	Weight	DOB	From
PG	32	Courtney Alexander	6 ft 5 in (1.96 m)	205 lb (93 kg)	1977-04-27	Fresno State
PG	3	Darrell Armstrong	6 ft 0 in (1.83 m)	170 lb (77 kg)	1968-06-22	Fayetteville State
SF	2	Stacey Augmon	6 ft 8 in (2.03 m)	205 lb (93 kg)	1968-08-01	UNLV
PF	42	P. J. Brown	6 ft 11 in (2.11 m)	239 lb (108 kg)	1969-10-14	Louisiana Tech
SG	5	Maurice Carter	6 ft 5 in (1.96 m)	209 lb (95 kg)	1976-10-12	LSU
PG	1	Baron Davis	6 ft 3 in (1.91 m)	212 lb (96 kg)	1979-04-13	UCLA
SF	9	George Lynch	6 ft 8 in (2.03 m)	218 lb (99 kg)	1970-09-03	North Carolina
C	21	Jamaal Magloire	6 ft 11 in (2.11 m)	265 lb (120 kg)	1978-05-21	Kentucky
SF	24	Jamal Mashburn	6 ft 8 in (2.03 m)	240 lb (109 kg)	1972-11-29	Kentucky
SG	8	Steve Smith	6 ft 8 in (2.03 m)	221 lb (100 kg)	1969-03-31	Michigan State
C	34	Robert Traylor	6 ft 8 in (2.03 m)	290 lb (132 kg)	1977-02-01	Michigan
SG	4	David Wesley	6 ft 1 in (1.85 m)	203 lb (92 kg)	1970-11-14	Baylor
PF	30	David West	6 ft 9 in (2.06 m)	250 lb (113 kg)	1980-08-29	Xavier
PG	11	Shammond Williams	6 ft 1 in (1.85 m)	205 lb (93 kg)	1975-04-05	North Carolina

Coaches
Head coach
- Tim Floyd
Assistant(s)
- Jeff Bower
- Kenny Gattison
- Alvin Gentry
- Jan van Breda Kolff
- Terry Kofler (trainer)

Legend
- (DP) Unsigned draft pick
- (FA) Free agent
- (S) Suspended
- Injured

Roster
Updated: March 25, 2004

=== Roster notes ===
- Point guard Courtney Alexander missed the entire season due to a ruptured Achilles tendon.

== Regular season ==
=== Season standings ===
Central Division	W	L	PCT	GB	Home	Road	Div
y-Indiana Pacers	61	21	.744	–	34–7	27–14	20–8
x-Detroit Pistons	54	28	.659	7	31–10	23–18	17–11
x-New Orleans Hornets	41	41	.500	20	25–16	16–25	14–14
x-Milwaukee Bucks	41	41	.500	20	27–14	14–27	15–13
e-Cleveland Cavaliers	35	47	.427	26	23–18	12–29	14–14
e-Toronto Raptors	33	49	.402	28	18–23	15–26	11–17
e-Atlanta Hawks	28	54	.341	33	18–23	10–31	10–18
e-Chicago Bulls	23	59	.280	38	14–27	9–32	11–17

#	Eastern Conference				
#	Team	W	L	PCT	GB
1	z-Indiana Pacers	61	21	.744	–
2	y-New Jersey Nets	47	35	.573	14
3	x-Detroit Pistons	54	28	.659	7
4	x-Miami Heat	42	40	.512	19
5	x-New Orleans Hornets	41	41	.500	20
6	x-Milwaukee Bucks	41	41	.500	20
7	x-New York Knicks	39	43	.476	22
8	x-Boston Celtics	36	46	.439	25
9	e-Cleveland Cavaliers	35	47	.427	26
10	e-Toronto Raptors	33	49	.402	28
11	e-Philadelphia 76ers	33	49	.402	28
12	e-Atlanta Hawks	28	54	.341	33
13	e-Washington Wizards	25	57	.305	36
14	e-Chicago Bulls	23	59	.280	38
15	e-Orlando Magic	21	61	.256	40

== Playoffs ==
2004 playoff game log
First Round: 3–4 (home: 3–0; road: 0–4)

Game	Date	Team	Score	High points	High rebounds	High assists	Location Attendance	Series
1	April 18	@ Miami	L 79–81	Baron Davis (17)	Brown, Magloire (11)	Augmon, Davis (4)	American Airlines Arena; 20,102	0–1
2	April 21	@ Miami	L 63–93	Baron Davis (13)	Jamaal Magloire (10)	Baron Davis (7)	American Airlines Arena; 20,189	0–2
3	April 24	Miami	W 77–71	Baron Davis (21)	Brown, Lynch (11)	Baron Davis (5)	New Orleans Arena; 14,251	1–2
4	April 27	Miami	W 96–85	Baron Davis (23)	Brown, West (7)	Baron Davis (10)	New Orleans Arena; 16,009	2–2
5	April 30	@ Miami	L 83–87	Baron Davis (33)	P. J. Brown (13)	Baron Davis (7)	American Airlines Arena; 20,147	2–3
6	May 2	Miami	W 89–83	Brown, Lynch (16)	Brown, Magloire (9)	Baron Davis (12)	New Orleans Arena; 17,297	3–3
7	May 4	@ Miami	L 77–85	Steve Smith (25)	Jamaal Magloire (10)	Davis, Williams (4)	American Airlines Arena; 20,286	3–4

2004 schedule

== Player statistics ==
Legend
GP	Games played	GS	Games started	MPG	Minutes per game
FG%	Field-goal percentage	3P%	3-point field-goal percentage	FT%	Free-throw percentage
RPG	Rebounds per game	APG	Assists per game	SPG	Steals per game
BPG	Blocks per game	PPG	Points per game

=== Season ===
Player	GP	GS	MPG	FG%	3FG%	FT%	RPG	APG	SPG	BPG	PPG
Darrell Armstrong	79	22	28.4	39.5	31.5	85.4	2.9	3.9	1.7	0.2	10.6
Stacey Augmon	69	24	20.5	41.2	14.3	79.1	2.5	1.2	0.8	0.2	5.8
P.J. Brown	80	80	34.4	47.6	0.0	85.4	8.6	1.9	1.0	0.9	10.5
Tierre Brown	3	0	5.7	50.0	0.0	50.0	0.3	0.7	0.0	0.0	2.0
Maurice Carter	6	0	10.0	28.6	37.5	62.5	1.3	0.3	0.0	0.0	3.3
Baron Davis	67	66	40.1	39.5	32.1	67.3	4.3	7.5	2.4	0.4	22.9
Bryce Drew	15	0	5.2	22.2	14.3	100.0	0.4	0.9	0.3	0.0	0.8
George Lynch	78	51	21.8	39.7	30.9	66.7	4.0	1.5	0.6	0.2	4.8
Jamaal Magloire	82	82	33.9	47.3	0.0	75.1	10.3	1.0	0.5	1.2	13.6
Jamal Mashburn	19	18	38.4	39.2	28.4	81.3	6.2	2.5	0.7	0.3	20.8
Sean Rooks	35	0	9.3	36.2	0.0	80.0	1.4	0.3	0.3	0.1	2.3
Steve Smith	71	4	13.1	40.6	40.2	92.8	1.1	0.8	0.2	0.1	5.0
Robert Traylor	71	0	13.3	50.5	40.0	54.7	3.7	0.6	0.5	0.5	5.1
David Wesley	61	60	32.8	38.9	32.3	75.3	2.2	2.9	1.2	0.2	14.0
David West	71	1	13.1	47.4	0.0	71.3	4.2	0.8	0.4	0.4	3.8
Shammond Williams	16	2	14.9	34.6	19.2	84.6	1.1	3.3	0.9	0.1	4.5

=== Playoffs ===
Player	GP	GS	MPG	FG%	3FG%	FT%	RPG	APG	SPG	BPG	PPG
Darrell Armstrong	7	0	21.4	23.5	20.0	100.0	2.1	2.3	0.9	0.0	3.4
Stacey Augmon	7	0	24.0	37.5	0.0	88.9	2.7	1.0	0.9	0.1	7.4
P.J. Brown	7	7	36.6	36.6	0.0	90.9	9.7	2.1	0.4	1.6	8.9
Maurice Carter	1	0	2.0	0.0	0.0	0.0	0.0	0.0	0.0	0.0	0.0
Baron Davis	7	7	37.1	37.7	32.7	75.8	4.1	7.0	1.6	0.7	18.1
George Lynch	7	7	21.0	43.9	25.0	62.5	5.3	1.7	0.4	0.4	8.3
Jamaal Magloire	7	7	34.1	41.8	0.0	75.0	9.1	0.7	0.4	1.0	11.0
Steve Smith	5	0	9.2	46.2	54.5	66.7	1.6	0.2	0.0	0.0	6.4
Robert Traylor	4	0	10.0	44.4	0.0	66.7	2.5	0.3	0.8	0.3	2.5
David Wesley	7	7	34.7	32.4	36.7	71.4	2.3	2.4	0.7	0.0	10.6
David West	7	0	15.9	53.6	0.0	84.6	4.3	1.1	0.3	0.6	5.9
Shammond Williams	3	0	6.0	40.0	0.0	75.0	0.0	1.3	0.3	0.0	2.3

== Awards and records ==
- Baron Davis, All-NBA Third Team

== Transactions ==
=== Trades ===
February 19, 2004	To New Orleans Hornets Shammond Williams To Orlando Magic Sean Rooks

=== Free agents ===
Additions
Player	Date signed	Former team
Sean Rooks	July 21	Los Angeles Clippers
Darrell Armstrong	July 29	Orlando Magic
Steve Smith	October 29	San Antonio Spurs
Tierre Brown (10-day)	January 26	North Charleston Lowgators (D-League)
Maurice Carter	March 25	Dakota Wizards (CBA)

Subtractions
Player	Date waived	New Team
James Lang	December 29	Oklahoma Storm (USBL)
Bryce Drew	March 2	Viola Reggio Calabria (Italy)
