= 2003–04 Atlanta Hawks season =

NBA professional basketball team season

- Head coach: Terry Stotts
- Arena: Philips Arena

Results
- Record: 28–54 (.341)
- Place: Division: 7th (Central); Conference: 12th (Eastern)
- Playoff finish: Did not qualify
- Stats at Basketball Reference

Local media
- Television: WUPA; Fox Sports Net South; Turner South
- Radio: WCNN

The 2003–04 Atlanta Hawks season was the 55th season for the Atlanta Hawks in the National Basketball Association, and their 36th season in Atlanta, Georgia.

== Season summary ==
=== Off-season ===
The Hawks had the 21st overall pick in the 2003 NBA draft, and selected small forward and French basketball star Boris Diaw. During the off-season, the team signed free agent Stephen Jackson, and re-signed former Hawks guard Jacque Vaughn after one season with the Orlando Magic.

=== Regular season ===
With the addition of Jackson, Vaughn and Diaw, the Hawks continued to struggle losing eight of their first eleven games of the regular season. The team posted a seven-game losing streak in December, and later on held an 18–35 record at the All-Star break. At mid-season, the team traded All-Star forward Shareef Abdur-Rahim, Theo Ratliff, and second-year guard Dan Dickau to the Portland Trail Blazers in exchange for All-Star forward Rasheed Wallace, and three-point specialist Wesley Person. However, Wallace only played just one game for the Hawks, in a 98–92 road loss to the New Jersey Nets at the Continental Airlines Arena on February 18, 2004; Wallace scored 20 points along with 6 rebounds and 5 blocks in 41 minutes. Afterwards, the Hawks traded Wallace to the Detroit Pistons in exchange for Bob Sura, and Željko Rebrača in a three-team trade; in another three-team trade, the team traded Nazr Mohammed to the New York Knicks, and acquired Joel Przybilla from the Milwaukee Bucks. Meanwhile, Dion Glover was released to free agency and signed with the Toronto Raptors. Wallace would later on win a championship with the Pistons, who went on to defeat the Los Angeles Lakers in five games in the 2004 NBA Finals.

In 53 games before the trades, Abdur-Rahim averaged 20.1 points and 9.3 rebounds per game, while Ratliff averaged 8.3 points, 7.2 rebounds and 3.1 blocks per game, and Mohammed provided with 6.5 points and 5.0 rebounds per game. Before being released to free agency, Glover contributed 10.1 points per game in 55 games. Due to injuries, the Hawks lacked big men on the team, as Przybilla only played just twelve games due to a left knee injury, and Rebrača only appeared in just three games due to a lower back injury. In February, the team signed free agent Mamadou N'Diaye, then later on signed former Georgia Tech University center Jason Collier in March. The Hawks played .500 in winning percentage by posting a 4–3 record in April, and finished in seventh place in the Central Division with a 28–54 record; the team missed the NBA playoffs for the fifth consecutive year.

Jackson averaged 18.1 points and 1.8 steals per game, and contributed 145 three-point field-goals, while Jason Terry averaged 16.8 points, 5.4 assists and 1.5 steals per game, and led the Hawks with 146 three-point field-goals, and Sura provided the team with 14.7 points, 8.3 rebounds and 5.3 assists per game in 27 games after the trade. In addition, Collier provided with 11.3 points and 5.6 rebounds per game in 20 games, while Chris Crawford contributed 10.2 points per game in 56 games, and Rebracca averaged 8.3 points and 3.0 rebounds per game during his short three-game stint. Meanwhile, Diaw provided with 4.5 points and rebounds per game each, Przybilla averaged 4.0 points, 8.4 rebounds and 1.4 blocks per game, and long-time Hawks forward Alan Henderson contributed 4.0 points and 3.5 rebounds per game, but only played just six games due to a back injury. N'Diaye provided with 3.9 points, 4.4 rebounds and 1.0 blocks per game in 25 games, and Vaughn contributed 3.8 points and 2.7 assists per game.

Jackson finished tied in 24th place in Most Improved Player voting. The Hawks finished last in the NBA in home-game attendance, with an attendance of 565,728 at the Philips Arena during the regular season, which was 29th in the league.

=== Aftermath ===
Following the season, head coach Terry Stotts was fired after coaching the Hawks for one in a half seasons, while Jackson was traded to the Indiana Pacers after only one season with the team, and Terry and Henderson were both traded to the Dallas Mavericks, after Terry spent five seasons with the Hawks. Meanwhile, Sura signed as a free agent with the Houston Rockets, Vaughn signed with the New Jersey Nets, Przybilla signed with the Portland Trail Blazers, and N'Diaye signed with the Los Angeles Clippers.

== Offseason ==
=== Draft picks ===
Round	Pick	Player	Position	Nationality	College
1	21	Boris Diaw	SF	France	
2	37	Travis Hansen	SG	United States	Brigham Young

== Roster ==
2003–04 Atlanta Hawks roster
Players

Pos.	No.	Player	Height	Weight	DOB	From
F	33	Michael Bradley	6 ft 10 in (2.08 m)	235 lb (107 kg)		Villanova
C	40	Jason Collier	7 ft 0 in (2.13 m)	260 lb (118 kg)		Georgia Tech
F	4	Chris Crawford	6 ft 9 in (2.06 m)	235 lb (107 kg)		Marquette
G	32	Boris Diaw	6 ft 8 in (2.03 m)	215 lb (98 kg)		INSEP
F	54	Obinna Ekezie (injured) (IN)	6 ft 9 in (2.06 m)	270 lb (122 kg)		Maryland
G	6	Travis Hansen	6 ft 6 in (1.98 m)	215 lb (98 kg)		BYU
F	44	Alan Henderson (injured)	6 ft 9 in (2.06 m)	235 lb (107 kg)		Indiana
F	1	Stephen Jackson	6 ft 8 in (2.03 m)	220 lb (100 kg)		Butler CC
C	34	Mamadou N'Diaye	7 ft 0 in (2.13 m)	255 lb (116 kg)		Auburn
G	7	Wesley Person	6 ft 6 in (1.98 m)	195 lb (88 kg)		Auburn
C	10	Joel Przybilla (injured)	7 ft 1 in (2.16 m)	245 lb (111 kg)		Minnesota
C	12	Željko Rebrača	7 ft 0 in (2.13 m)	265 lb (120 kg)		Serbia
G	3	Bob Sura	6 ft 5 in (1.96 m)	200 lb (91 kg)		Florida State
G	31	Jason Terry	6 ft 2 in (1.88 m)	185 lb (84 kg)		Arizona
G	11	Jacque Vaughn	6 ft 1 in (1.85 m)	190 lb (86 kg)		Kansas

Coaches
Head coach
- Terry Stotts (Oklahoma)

Legend
- (DP) Unsigned draft pick
- (FA) Free agent
- (S) Suspended
- Injured

Roster

=== Roster notes ===
- Power forward Obinna Ekezie was on the injured reserve list due to a torn ACL in his right knee, and missed the entire regular season.

== Regular season ==
=== Season standings ===
Central Division	W	L	PCT	GB	Home	Road	Div
y-Indiana Pacers	61	21	.744	–	34–7	27–14	20–8
x-Detroit Pistons	54	28	.659	7	31–10	23–18	17–11
x-New Orleans Hornets	41	41	.500	20	25–16	16–25	14–14
x-Milwaukee Bucks	41	41	.500	20	27–14	14–27	15–13
e-Cleveland Cavaliers	35	47	.427	26	23–18	12–29	14–14
e-Toronto Raptors	33	49	.402	28	18–23	15–26	11–17
e-Atlanta Hawks	28	54	.341	33	18–23	10–31	10–18
e-Chicago Bulls	23	59	.280	38	14–27	9–32	11–17

#	Eastern Conference				
#	Team	W	L	PCT	GB
1	z-Indiana Pacers	61	21	.744	–
2	y-New Jersey Nets	47	35	.573	14
3	x-Detroit Pistons	54	28	.659	7
4	x-Miami Heat	42	40	.512	19
5	x-New Orleans Hornets	41	41	.500	20
6	x-Milwaukee Bucks	41	41	.500	20
7	x-New York Knicks	39	43	.476	22
8	x-Boston Celtics	36	46	.439	25
9	e-Cleveland Cavaliers	35	47	.427	26
10	e-Toronto Raptors	33	49	.402	28
11	e-Philadelphia 76ers	33	49	.402	28
12	e-Atlanta Hawks	28	54	.341	33
13	e-Washington Wizards	25	57	.305	36
14	e-Chicago Bulls	23	59	.280	38
15	e-Orlando Magic	21	61	.256	40

z - clinched division title
y - clinched division title
x - clinched playoff spot

== Player statistics ==
Legend
GP	Games played	GS	Games started	MPG	Minutes per game
FG%	Field-goal percentage	3P%	3-point field-goal percentage	FT%	Free-throw percentage
RPG	Rebounds per game	APG	Assists per game	SPG	Steals per game
BPG	Blocks per game	PPG	Points per game

=== Season ===
Player	GP	GS	MPG	FG%	3P%	FT%	RPG	APG	SPG	BPG	PPG
Shareef Abdur-Rahim	53	53	36.9	48.5	21.7	88.0	9.3	2.4	0.8	0.4	20.1
Rasheed Wallace	1	1	42.0	33.3	16.7	100.0	6.0	2.0	1.0	5.0	20.0
Stephen Jackson	80	78	36.8	42.5	34.0	78.5	4.6	3.1	1.8	0.3	18.1
Jason Terry	81	78	37.3	41.7	34.7	82.7	4.1	5.4	1.5	0.2	16.8
Bob Sura	27	18	35.4	42.0	27.9	78.3	8.3	5.3	0.9	0.2	14.7
Jason Collier	20	16	27.3	47.9	25.0	78.8	5.6	0.9	0.6	0.6	11.3
Chris Crawford	56	25	21.6	44.8	38.9	86.6	3.1	0.8	0.7	0.4	10.2
Dion Glover	55	26	26.6	39.1	34.3	77.5	4.3	2.1	0.7	0.3	10.1
Theo Ratliff	53	52	31.1	45.8	0.0	65.3	7.2	1.0	0.6	3.1	8.3
Zeljko Rebraca	3	0	17.0	52.2	0.0	50.0	3.0	0.7	0.0	0.7	8.3
Nazr Mohammed	53	1	17.7	49.3	0.0	62.7	5.0	0.4	0.4	0.5	6.5
Lee Nailon	27	0	11.1	45.7	0.0	84.2	2.3	0.6	0.4	0.3	5.3
Boris Diaw	76	37	25.3	44.7	23.1	60.2	4.5	2.4	0.8	0.5	4.5
Wesley Person	9	0	14.7	33.3	42.1	100.0	2.8	0.6	0.3	0.1	4.4
Joel Przybilla	12	12	26.2	36.0	0.0	41.4	8.4	0.3	0.4	1.4	4.0
Alan Henderson	6	0	11.3	47.6	0.0	66.7	3.5	0.3	0.2	0.3	4.0
Mamadou N'Diaye	25	1	14.4	39.7	0.0	74.6	4.4	0.0	0.3	1.0	3.9
Jacque Vaughn	71	6	17.9	38.6	15.0	77.9	1.6	2.7	0.6	0.0	3.8
Travis Hansen	41	4	12.4	35.4	30.0	81.5	1.7	0.5	0.2	0.2	3.0
Dan Dickau	23	0	6.2	42.9	30.0	66.7	0.7	0.8	0.4	0.0	2.1
Hiram Fuller	4	0	10.8	37.5	0.0	33.3	2.8	0.5	0.0	0.3	2.0
Josh Davis	4	1	5.8	40.0	0.0	100.0	1.3	0.0	0.0	0.0	1.3
Michael Bradley	11	1	5.5	50.0	0.0	0.0	1.1	0.0	0.2	0.0	1.1

Player statistics citation:

== See also ==
- 2003-04 NBA season
