= 2003–04 Detroit Pistons season =

NBA team season

- NBA champions
- Conference champions
- Head coach: Larry Brown
- President: Joe Dumars
- General manager: Joe Dumars
- Owner: Bill Davidson
- Arena: The Palace of Auburn Hills

Results
- Record: 54–28 (.659)
- Place: Division: 2nd (Central); Conference: 3rd (Eastern)
- Playoff finish: NBA champions (Defeated Lakers 4–1)
- Stats at Basketball Reference

Local media
- Television: Fox Sports Net Detroit; WKBD
- Radio: WDFN

The 2003–04 Detroit Pistons season was the 63rd season for the Pistons, the 56th in the National Basketball Association, and the 47th in the Detroit area. Despite a solid year the previous season, the Pistons received the second overall pick in the 2003 NBA draft, which they obtained from the Memphis Grizzlies. They selected Darko Miličić as their top pick but only used him as a reserve, as he played limited minutes off the bench; he would later be regarded as one of the most suboptimal picks in the history of the NBA draft. After their first trip to the Conference Finals since 1991, the Pistons hired Larry Brown as head coach. Under Brown, the Pistons were once again a tough defensive team, as they went on a 13-game winning streak between December and January. However, after a solid 33–16 start, they struggled in February, losing six straight games. At midseason, the team acquired All-Star forward Rasheed Wallace from the Atlanta Hawks after playing just one game for them. With the addition of Wallace, the Pistons won 16 of their final 19 games, finishing second in the Central Division with a 54–28 record. Ben Wallace was selected for the 2004 NBA All-Star Game. The Pistons went on to win the NBA Championship for the third time in franchise history, with Miličić being the youngest player to win said championship.

In the first round of the playoffs, the Pistons defeated the Milwaukee Bucks in five games despite losing Game 2 at home. In the semifinals, they faced the New Jersey Nets who swept them in the Eastern Conference Finals in the previous year. The Pistons would win the first two games at home, but the Nets would put up a fight against the Pistons by winning 3 straight games to take a 3–2 series lead, which included a triple overtime win in Game 5 at The Palace. However, with the Pistons facing elimination, the Pistons were digging an early hole in Game 6, but the Pistons were able to erase a 13–2 deficit and never trailed for the remainder of the game as they would refuse to relinquish the lead to the Nets and win Game 6 81–75. In Game 7, the Pistons stingy defense held Jason Kidd to 0 points to beat the Nets 90–69 to advance to the Eastern Conference Finals, where they defeated the top-seeded Indiana Pacers in a defensive six game series to earn their first appearance in the NBA Finals since 1990. In the Finals, the Pistons would pull off one of the greatest upsets in NBA Finals history by defeating the heavily favored Los Angeles Lakers four games to one, winning their third overall championship and first since 1990. Chauncey Billups was named Finals MVP. The 2004 Pistons are one of only three teams, alongside the 1951 Rochester Royals and 1979 Seattle Supersonics, to win an NBA title before 2021 without a single player named to the 2021 NBA 75th Anniversary Team.

== Draft picks ==
Round	Pick	Player	Position	Nationality	College / Team
1	2	Darko Miličić	Forward/Center	Serbia and Montenegro	Hemofarm Vrsac (Serbia and Montenegro and Adriatic League)
1	25	Carlos Delfino	Guard	Argentina	Unión de Santa Fe (Argentina)
2	58	Andreas Glyniadakis	Center	Greece	AEK Athens (Greece)

== Roster ==
2003–04 Detroit Pistons roster
Players

Pos.	No.	Player	Height	Weight	DOB	From
PG	1	Chauncey Billups	6 ft 3 in (1.91 m)	202 lb (92 kg)	1976-09-25	Colorado
C	41	Elden Campbell	6 ft 11 in (2.11 m)	279 lb (127 kg)	1968-07-23	Clemson
SF	24	Tremaine Fowlkes	6 ft 7 in (2.01 m)	212 lb (96 kg)	1976-04-11	Fresno State
SF	8	Darvin Ham	6 ft 7 in (2.01 m)	240 lb (109 kg)	1973-07-23	Texas Tech
SG	32	Richard Hamilton	6 ft 7 in (2.01 m)	193 lb (88 kg)	1978-02-14	Connecticut
SG	10	Lindsey Hunter	6 ft 2 in (1.88 m)	195 lb (88 kg)	1970-12-03	Jackson State
PG	7	Mike James	6 ft 2 in (1.88 m)	188 lb (85 kg)	1975-06-23	Duquesne
C	31	Darko Miličić	7 ft 0 in (2.13 m)	275 lb (125 kg)	1985-06-20	Serbia and Montenegro
PF	13	Mehmet Okur	6 ft 11 in (2.11 m)	290 lb (132 kg)	1979-05-26	Turkey
SF	22	Tayshaun Prince	6 ft 9 in (2.06 m)	215 lb (98 kg)	1980-02-28	Kentucky
C	3	Ben Wallace	6 ft 9 in (2.06 m)	245 lb (111 kg)	1974-09-10	Virginia Union
PF	30	Rasheed Wallace	6 ft 11 in (2.11 m)	230 lb (104 kg)	1974-09-17	North Carolina
PF	34	Corliss Williamson	6 ft 7 in (2.01 m)	245 lb (111 kg)	1973-12-04	Arkansas

Coaches
Head coach
- Larry Brown
Assistant(s)
- Herb Brown
- Dave Hanners
- Igor Kokoškov
- John Kuester
- Mike Woodson
- Mike Abdenour (trainer)

Legend
- (DP) Unsigned draft pick
- (FA) Free agent
- (S) Suspended
- Injured

Roster
Updated: February 26, 2004

== Regular season ==
=== Season standings ===
Central Division	W	L	PCT	GB	Home	Road	Div
y-Indiana Pacers	61	21	.744	–	34–7	27–14	20–8
x-Detroit Pistons	54	28	.659	7	31–10	23–18	17–11
x-New Orleans Hornets	41	41	.500	20	25–16	16–25	14–14
x-Milwaukee Bucks	41	41	.500	20	27–14	14–27	15–13
e-Cleveland Cavaliers	35	47	.427	26	23–18	12–29	14–14
e-Toronto Raptors	33	49	.402	28	18–23	15–26	11–17
e-Atlanta Hawks	28	54	.341	33	18–23	10–31	10–18
e-Chicago Bulls	23	59	.280	38	14–27	9–32	11–17

#	Eastern Conference				
#	Team	W	L	PCT	GB
1	z-Indiana Pacers	61	21	.744	–
2	y-New Jersey Nets	47	35	.573	14
3	x-Detroit Pistons	54	28	.659	7
4	x-Miami Heat	42	40	.512	19
5	x-New Orleans Hornets	41	41	.500	20
6	x-Milwaukee Bucks	41	41	.500	20
7	x-New York Knicks	39	43	.476	22
8	x-Boston Celtics	36	46	.439	25
9	e-Cleveland Cavaliers	35	47	.427	26
10	e-Toronto Raptors	33	49	.402	28
11	e-Philadelphia 76ers	33	49	.402	28
12	e-Atlanta Hawks	28	54	.341	33
13	e-Washington Wizards	25	57	.305	36
14	e-Chicago Bulls	23	59	.280	38
15	e-Orlando Magic	21	61	.256	40

=== Game log ===
2003–04 game log
Total: 54–28 (Home: 31–10; Road: 23–18)
October: 1–1 (home: 0–1; road: 1–0)

Game	Date	Team	Score	High points	High rebounds	High assists	Location Attendance	Record
1	October 29	Indiana	L 87–89	Wallace, Prince (16)	Ben Wallace (17)	Chauncey Billups (7)	The Palace of Auburn Hills; 22,076	0–1
2	October 31	@ Miami	W 93–81	Chauncey Billups (27)	Ben Wallace (15)	Tayshaun Prince (5)	American Airlines Arena; 15,825	1–1

November: 11–5 (home: 6–1; road: 5–4)

Game	Date	Team	Score	High points	High rebounds	High assists	Location Attendance	Record
3	November 1	@ Orlando	W 96–85	Richard Hamilton (20)	Ben Wallace (17)	Chauncey Billups (4)	TD Waterhouse Centre; 14,588	2–1
4	November 5	Boston	W 96–88	Chauncey Billups (27)	Ben Wallace (13)	Chauncey Billups (6)	The Palace of Auburn Hills; 17,376	3–1
5	November 7	Milwaukee	W 105–99	Chauncey Billups (27)	Ben Wallace (15)	Chauncey Billups (7)	The Palace of Auburn Hills; 20,204	4–1
6	November 9	New Jersey	W 98–84	Richard Hamilton (24)	Ben Wallace (11)	Chauncey Billups (7)	The Palace of Auburn Hills; 20,664	5–1
7	November 11	@ Sacramento	L 91–97	Richard Hamilton (19)	Mehmet Okur (9)	Hamilton, Billups (3)	ARCO Arena; 17,317	5–2
8	November 12	@ Golden State	L 85–87 (OT)	Chauncey Billups (19)	Ben Wallace (11)	Chauncey Billups (12)	The Arena in Oakland; 14,382	5–3
9	November 14	@ L.A. Lakers	L 89–94	Chauncey Billups (29)	Mehmet Okur (9)	Billups, Hamilton (5)	Staples Center; 18,997	5–4
10	November 15	@ Phoenix	W 100–91	Richard Hamilton (27)	Ben Wallace (16)	Tayshaun Prince (5)	America West Arena; 15,681	6–4
11	November 18	L.A. Lakers	W 106–96	Chauncey Billups (25)	Ben Wallace (15)	Chauncey Billups (8)	The Palace of Auburn Hills; 22,076	7–4
12	November 19	@ Memphis	W 99–92	Chauncey Billups (33)	Mehmet Okur (9)	Tayshaun Prince (6)	Pyramid Arena; 13,340	8–4
13	November 21	New York	W 94–85	Chauncey Billups (23)	B. Wallace, Okur (9)	Chauncey Billups (3)	The Palace of Auburn Hills; 22,076	9–4
14	November 23	New Orleans	L 80–81	Prince, Hamilton (13)	Mehmet Okur (18)	Chauncey Billups (9)	The Palace of Auburn Hills; 22,076	9–5
15	November 24	@ Atlanta	W 94–89	Chauncey Billups (24)	Ben Wallace (15)	Billups, Sura (4)	Philips Arena; 18,255	10–5
16	November 26	@ Philadelphia	L 86–90	Richard Hamilton (19)	Ben Wallace (8)	Richard Hamilton (6)	Wachovia Center; 20,512	10–6
17	November 28	Cleveland	W 92–88	Richard Hamilton (44)	Ben Wallace (15)	Tayshaun Prince (7)	The Palace of Auburn Hills; 22,076	11–6
18	November 29	@ Washington	W 80–69	Richard Hamilton (25)	Ben Wallace (11)	Chauncey Billups (6)	MCI Center; 16,853	12–6

December: 7–7 (home: 5–3; road: 2–4)

Game	Date	Team	Score	High points	High rebounds	High assists	Location Attendance	Record
19	December 1	@ New York	W 79–78 (OT)	Chauncey Billups (24)	Ben Wallace (14)	Richard Hamilton (6)	Madison Square Garden; 17,082	13–6
20	December 3	Miami	W 87–73	Richard Hamilton (18)	Ben Wallace (21)	B. Wallace, Billups, Prince (3)	The Palace of Auburn Hills; 17,703	14–6
21	December 6	@ Houston	L 80–86	Richard Hamilton (17)	Ben Wallace (10)	Chauncey Billups (4)	Toyota Center; 18,144	14–7
22	December 9	Philadelphia	L 76–78	Chauncey Billups (29)	Ben Wallace (9)	Richard Hamilton (5)	The Palace of Auburn Hills; 20,166	14–8
23	December 11	@ Cleveland	L 86–95	Richard Hamilton (19)	Ben Wallace (9)	Richard Hamiton (8)	Gund Arena; 15,115	14–9
24	December 12	Seattle	L 72–93	Ben Wallace (14)	Ben Wallace (11)	Chauncey Billups (6)	The Palace of Auburn Hills; 20,244	14–10
25	December 17	Chicago	W 77–73	Richaed Hamilton (20)	Ben Wallace (15)	Prince, Hamilton, Atkins (5)	The Palace of Auburn Hills; 17,041	15–10
26	December 19	@ Indiana	L 75–80	Chauncey Billups (13)	Ben Wallace (11)	Chauncey Billups (3)	Conseco Fieldhouse; 16,383	15–11
27	December 21	Utah	W 96–75	Chauncey Billups (19)	Ben Wallace (13)	Chauncey Billups (6)	The Palace of Auburn Hills; 22,076	16–11
28	December 23	@ Milwaukee	L 78–83	Richard Hamilton (17)	Ben Wallace (20)	Hamilton, Billups (4)	Bradley Center; 15,081	16–12
29	December 26	New Jersey	L 79–82	Richard Hamilton (20)	Ben Wallace (18)	Ben Wallace (5)	The Palace of Auburn Hills; 22,076	16–13
30	December 27	@ Atlanta	W 87–84	Richard Hamilton (28)	Ben Wallace (10)	Chauncey Billups (4)	Philips Arena; 19,445	17–13
31	December 29	New Orleans	W 108–99	Chauncey Billups (31)	Ben Wallace (18)	Richard Hamilton (7)	The Palace of Auburn Hills; 22,076	18–13
32	December 31	Portland	W 78–71	Chauncey Billups (22)	Ben Wallace (15)	Chauncey Billups (7)	The Palace of Auburn Hills; 20,458	19–13

January: 13–3 (home: 8–1; road: 5–2)

Game	Date	Team	Score	High points	High rebounds	High assists	Location Attendance	Record
33	January 2	Phoenix	W 93–81	Richard Hamilton (26)	Ben Wallace (22)	Hamilton, Billups (6)	The Palace of Auburn Hills; 22,076	20–13
34	January 3	Golden State	W 99–93	Tayshaun Prince (20)	Tayshaun Prince (9)	Chauncey Billups (10)	The Palace of Auburn Hills; 20,719	21–13
35	January 5	@ Boston	W 78–68	Richard Hamilton (15)	Ben Wallace (16)	Ben Wallace (5)	FleetCenter; 13,015	22–13
36	January 7	Houston	W 85–66	Richard Hamilton (16)	Ben Wallace (15)	Chauncey Billups (5)	The Palace of Auburn Hills; 19,111	23–13
37	January 11	Dallas	W 115–102	Chauncey Billups (27)	Ben Wallace (13)	Prince, Billups (5)	The Palace of Auburn Hills; 22,076	24–13
38	January 13	@ Chicago	W 105–89	Richard Hamilton (24)	Ben Wallace (17)	Prince, Billups (7)	United Center; 17,295	25–13
39	January 14	Toronto	W 95–91	Hamilton, Okur (27)	Mehmet Okur (14)	Chauncey Billups (6)	The Palace of Auburn Hills; 18,473	26–13
40	January 16	Washington	W 98–77	Richard Hamilton (17)	Mehmet Okur (9)	Chauncey Billups (10)	The Palace of Auburn Hills; 20,539	27–13
41	January 17	@ Milwaukee	W 99–94	Chauncey Billups (26)	Ben Wallace (11)	Chaucney Billups (6)	Bradley Center; 18,717	28–13
42	January 19	San Antonio	W 85–77	Chauncey Billups (18)	Ben Wallace (16)	Richard Hamilton (6)	The Palace of Auburn Hills; 22,076	29–13
43	January 20	@ Indiana	L 69–81	Richard Hamilton (15)	Ben Wallace (10)	Chucky Atkins (4)	Conseco Fieldhouse; 15,848	29–14
44	January 23	@ Minnesota	L 79–80	Mehmet Okur (21)	B. Wallace, Hamilton (10)	Chucky Atkins (5)	Target Center; 19,006	29–15
45	January 25	Atlanta	L 82–91	Ben Wallace (14)	Ben Wallace (15)	Ben Wallace (5)	The Palace of Auburn Hills; 22,076	29–16
46	January 28	@ Boston	W 106–103	Billups, Okur (21)	Ben Wallace (15)	B. Wallace, Atkins (4)	FleetCenter; 14,042	30–16
47	January 30	@ Toronto	W 90–89 (OT)	Richard Hamilton (28)	Ben Wallace (18)	Chauncey Billups (4)	Air Canada Centre; 19,555	31–16
48	January 31	Memphis	W 80–78	Richard Hamilton (20)	Ben Wallace (13)	Chauncey Billups (5)	The Palace of Auburn Hills; 22,076	32–16

February: 6–8 (home: 2–4; road: 4–4)

Game	Date	Team	Score	High points	High rebounds	High assists	Location Attendance	Record
49	February 2	@ Miami	W 102–100 (OT)	Tayshaun Prince (24)	Ben Wallace (12)	Richard Hamilton (7)	American Airlines Arena; 15,438	33–16
50	February 3	Cleveland	L 82–85	Chauncey Billups (19)	Ben Wallace (17)	Chauncey Billups (5)	The Palace of Auburn Hills; 22,076	33–17
51	February 6	@ New Orleans	L 81–92	Ben Wallace (14)	Ben Wallace (13)	Richard Hamilton (5)	New Orleans Arena; 14,016	33–18
52	February 7	@ Dallas	L 108–111	Chauncey Billups (17)	Ben Wallace (8)	Richard Hamilton (6)	American Airlines Center; 20,357	33–19
53	February 10	@ New Jersey	L 78–89	Chauncey Billups (23)	Ben Wallace (12)	Chauncey Billups (5)	Continental Airlines Arena; 13,781	33–20
54	February 11	Sacramento	L 94–96	Richard Hamilton (27)	Ben Wallace (19)	Chauncey Billups (7)	The Palace of Auburn Hills; 22,076	33–21
All-Star Break
55	February 17	@ New York	L 88–92	Chauncey Billups (26)	Ben Wallace (13)	Okur, Sura (3)	Madison Square Garden; 19,763	33–22
56	February 18	Milwaukee	W 102–98	Richard Hamilton (23)	Ben Wallace (15)	Chauncey Billups (7)	The Palace of Auburn Hills; 22,076	34–22
57	February 20	Minnesota	L 87–88	Richard Hamilton (24)	Ben Wallace (12)	Chauncey Billups (11)	The Palace of Auburn Hills; 22,076	34–23
58	February 22	Orlando	L 86–87	Richard Hamilton (23)	Ben Wallace (13)	Chauncey Billups (8)	The Palace of Auburn Hills; 22,076	34–24
59	February 23	@ Philadelphia	W 76–66	Richard Hamilton (15)	Ben Wallace (13)	Chauncey Billups (4)	Wachovia Center; 19,972	35–24
60	February 25	@ Chicago	W 107–88	Richard Hamilton (21)	Ben Wallace (8)	Billips, Hamilton (6)	United Center; 19,814	36–24
61	February 27	Atlanta	W 105–83	Billups, Hamilton (20)	Ben Wallace (15)	Chauncey Billups (8)	The Palace of Auburn Hills; 22,076	37–24
62	February 29	@ L.A. Clippers	W 100–88	Chauncey Billups (28)	Ben Wallace (13)	Chauncey Billups (7)	Staples Center; 18,775	38–24

March: 10–3 (home: 5–0; road: 5–3)

Game	Date	Team	Score	High points	High rebounds	High assists	Location Attendance	Record
63	March 1	@ Utah	L 86–94	Rasheed Wallace (27)	Ben Wallace (16)	Billups, Prince (3)	Delta Center; 19,911	38–25
64	March 4	@ Portland	W 83–68	Chauncey Billups (16)	Ben Wallace (19)	Tayshaun Prince (6)	Rose Garden; 20,243	39–25
65	March 6	@ Denver	W 97–66	Rasheed Wallace (20)	Rasheed Wallace (10)	Chauncey Billups (13)	Pepsi Center; 19,681	40–25
66	March 7	@ Seattle	W 86–65	Rasheed Wallace (18)	Ben Wallace (13)	Mike James (6)	KeyArena; 14,739	41–25
67	March 10	Chicago	W 98–65	Chauncey Billups (19)	Ben Wallace (9)	Hamilton, Billups, James (6)	The Palace of Auburn Hills; 22,076	42–25
68	March 14	Philadelphia	W 85–69	Rasheed Wallace (14)	Rasheed Wallace (8)	Chauncey Billups (9)	The Palace of Auburn Hills; 22,076	43–25
69	March 18	@ New Jersey	W 89–71	Chauncey Billups (20)	Richard Hamilton (9)	Chauncey Billups (8)	Continental Airlines Arena; 14,799	44–25
70	March 19	Denver	W 94–75	R. Wallace, Hamilton (20)	Ben Wallace (9)	Chauncey Billups (12)	The Palace of Auburn Hills; 22,076	45–25
71	March 21	@ Cleveland	W 96–76	Chauncey Billups (18)	Ben Wallace (10)	Chauncey Billups (6)	Gund Arena; 20,562	46–25
72	March 23	@ New Orleans	L 81–82	Richard Hamilton (17)	Ben Wallace (15)	Chauncey Billups (7)	New Orleans Arena; 14,377	46–26
73	March 25	@ San Antonio	L 75–84	Rasheed Wallace (17)	Rasheed Wallace (14)	Hamilton, Hunter (5)	SBC Center; 17,695	46–27
74	March 27	New York	W 100–85	Tayshaun Prince (20)	Ben Wallace (12)	Chauncey Billups (13)	The Palace of Auburn Hills; 22,076	47–27
75	March 31	L.A. Clippers	W 108–99	Richard Hamilton (28)	Ben Wallace (8)	Mike James (8)	The Palace of Auburn Hills; 22,076	48–27

April: 6–1 (home: 5–0; road: 1–1)

Game	Date	Team	Score	High points	High rebounds	High assists	Location Attendance	Record
76	April 2	Miami	W 92–84	Chauncey Billups (31)	Ben Wallace (8)	Chauncey Billups (7)	The Palace of Auburn Hills; 22,076	49–27
77	April 4	Indiana	W 79–61	Richard Hamilton (24)	Ben Wallace (11)	Chauncey Billups (7)	The Palace of Auburn Hills; 22,076	50–27
78	April 6	Orlando	W 102–86	Rasheed Wallace (17)	Rasheed Wallace (11)	Mike James (9)	The Palace of Auburn Hills; 22,076	51–27
79	April 9	Toronto	W 74–66	Richard Hamilton (20)	Ben Wallace (16)	Lindsey Hunter (6)	The Palace of Auburn Hills; 22,076	52–27
80	April 10	@ Orlando	W 101–89	Tayshaun Prince (25)	Williamson, Miličić (6)	Mike James (8)	TD Waterhouse Centre; 15,571	53–27
81	April 12	Washington	W 101–79	Richard Hamilton (24)	Ben Wallace (12)	Richard Hamilton (12)	The Palace of Auburn Hills; 22,076	54–27
82	April 13	@ Toronto	L 78–87	Tayshaun Prince (21)	Ben Wallace (7)	Richard Hamilton (10)	Air Canada Centre; 18,273	54–28

2003–04 schedule

== Playoffs ==
2004 playoff game log
First Round: 4–1 (home: 2–1; road: 2–0)

Game	Date	Team	Score	High points	High rebounds	High assists	Location Attendance	Series
1	April 18	Milwaukee	W 108–82	Richard Hamilton (21)	Ben Wallace (14)	Richard Hamilton (8)	The Palace of Auburn Hills; 22,076	1–0
2	April 21	Milwaukee	L 88–92	Chauncey Billups (20)	Ben Wallace (12)	Chauncey Billups (8)	The Palace of Auburn Hills; 22,076	1–1
3	April 24	@ Milwaukee	W 95–85	Chauncey Billups (21)	Ben Wallace (21)	Chauncey Billups (7)	Bradley Center; 18,717	2–1
4	April 26	@ Milwaukee	W 109–92	Richard Hamilton (27)	B. Wallace, R. Wallace (9)	Chauncey Billups (9)	Bradley Center; 17,316	3–1
5	April 29	Milwaukee	W 91–77	Tayshaun Prince (24)	Ben Wallace (12)	Tayshaun Prince (8)	The Palace of Auburn Hills; 22,076	4–1

Conference Semifinals: 4–3 (home: 3–1; road: 1–2)

Game	Date	Team	Score	High points	High rebounds	High assists	Location Attendance	Series
1	May 3	New Jersey	W 78–56	Hamilton, Prince (15)	Ben Wallace (11)	Richard Hamilton (7)	The Palace of Auburn Hills; 22,076	1–0
2	May 7	New Jersey	W 95–80	Billups, Hamilton (28)	Ben Wallace (11)	Chauncey Billups (13)	The Palace of Auburn Hills; 22,076	2–0
3	May 9	@ New Jersey	L 64–82	Hamilton, B. Wallace (15)	Ben Wallace (24)	Ben Wallace (4)	Continental Airlines Arena; 19,000	2–1
4	May 11	@ New Jersey	L 79–94	Richard Hamilton (30)	Ben Wallace (15)	Chauncey Billups (5)	Continental Airlines Arena; 19,860	2–2
5	May 14	New Jersey	L 120–127 (3OT)	Chauncey Billups (31)	Ben Wallace (11)	Richard Hamilton (11)	The Palace of Auburn Hills; 22,076	2–3
6	May 16	@ New Jersey	W 81–75	Richard Hamilton (24)	Ben Wallace (20)	Richard Hamilton (4)	Continental Airlines Arena; 19,968	3–3
7	May 20	New Jersey	W 90–69	Chauncey Billups (22)	Ben Wallace (8)	Chauncey Billups (7)	The Palace of Auburn Hills; 22,076	4–3

Conference Finals: 4–2 (home: 2–1; road: 2–1)

Game	Date	Team	Score	High points	High rebounds	High assists	Location Attendance	Series
1	May 22	@ Indiana	L 74–78	Richard Hamilton (23)	Ben Wallace (22)	Ben Wallace (5)	Conseco Fieldhouse; 18,345	0–1
2	May 24	@ Indiana	W 72–67	Richard Hamilton (23)	three players tied (8)	Chauncey Billups (6)	Conseco Fieldhouse; 18,345	1–1
3	May 26	Indiana	W 85–78	Hamilton, R. Wallace (20)	Ben Wallace (16)	Chauncey Billups (8)	The Palace of Auburn Hills; 22,076	2–1
4	May 28	Indiana	L 68–83	Richard Hamilton (22)	Ben Wallace (19)	Chauncey Billups (5)	The Palace of Auburn Hills; 22,076	2–2
5	May 30	@ Indiana	W 83–65	Richard Hamilton (33)	Ben Wallace (12)	Chauncey Billups (7)	Conseco Fieldhouse; 18,345	3–2
6	June 1	Indiana	W 69–65	Richard Hamilton (21)	Ben Wallace (16)	Richard Hamilton (5)	The Palace of Auburn Hills; 22,076	4–2

NBA Finals: 4–1 (home: 3–0; road: 1–1)

Game	Date	Team	Score	High points	High rebounds	High assists	Location Attendance	Series
1	June 6	@ L.A. Lakers	W 87–75	Chauncey Billups (22)	B. Wallace, R. Wallace (8)	Richard Hamilton (5)	Staples Center; 18,997	1–0
2	June 8	@ L.A. Lakers	L 91–99 (OT)	Chauncey Billups (27)	Ben Wallace (14)	Chauncey Billups (9)	Staples Center; 18,997	1–1
3	June 10	L.A. Lakers	W 88–68	Richard Hamilton (31)	Ben Wallace (11)	three players tied (3)	The Palace of Auburn Hills; 22,076	2–1
4	June 13	L.A. Lakers	W 88–80	Rasheed Wallace (26)	B. Wallace, R. Wallace (13)	Richard Hamilton (6)	The Palace of Auburn Hills; 22,076	3–1
5	June 15	L.A. Lakers	W 100–87	Richard Hamilton (21)	Ben Wallace (22)	Chauncey Billups (6)	The Palace of Auburn Hills; 22,076	4–1

2004 schedule

== NBA Finals ==
=== Series summary ===
Team/Game	1	2 (OT)	3	4	5	Wins
Los Angeles (West)	75	99	68	80	87	1
Detroit (East)	87	91	88	88	100	4

(OT) denotes a game that required overtime.

The Finals were played using a 2–3–2 site format, where the first two and last two games are held at the team with home court advantage. This was only used in the Finals, all other playoff series are held in a 2–2–1–1–1 format (the team with home court advantage starts).

=== Aspects ===
The Lakers had a lineup of stars such as Karl Malone, Gary Payton, Derek Fisher, Kobe Bryant, and Shaquille O'Neal – their offensive capability was expected to overpower Detroit's defensive-based gameplan.

Payton and Malone also added to the publicity of the Finals. Perennial All-Stars who had both previously reached the Finals, Payton had led the Seattle SuperSonics there in 1996, while Malone had led the Utah Jazz there in 1997 and 1998. However, Michael Jordan and the Bulls denied their championship rings a total of three times. By the time of Jordan's retirement in 2003, the two veterans were aged and failed to lead their teams deep into the playoffs. Thus, this Finals series was seen as the last chance for two of the greatest players in NBA history to finally become NBA champions (Later on, Malone retired while Payton became a champion as a key bench player for the Miami Heat).

=== Game One ===
Sunday, June 6, 2004, 14:30 at the Staples Center.

Considered to be an upset by most of the NBA world, the Detroit Pistons managed to defeat the Lakers with defense. Clamping down on everyone but Bryant and O'Neal, the Pistons managed to hold everyone else to a total of 16 points.

The Pistons trailed the Lakers 41–40 at halftime, but a 10–4 surge capped by Billups's 3-pointer gave the Pistons the lead. O'Neal's foul trouble furthered the scoring gap, with the Pistons leading by 13 points early in the fourth quarter.

Team	1st Qt.	2nd Qt.	3rd Qt.	4th Qt.	Total
Detroit	22	18	24	23	87
Los Angeles	19	22	17	17	75

=== Game Two ===
Tuesday, June 8, 2004, 15:04 at the Staples Center.

The second game was close throughout the first half, but in the third quarter Detroit would score 30 points, cutting the deficit 68–66. However, at the end of the fourth quarter, Kobe Bryant's 3-point shot at 2.1 seconds to go would tie the game at 89–89. The Lakers and Pistons would then go to overtime, with the Lakers outscoring the Pistons 10–2.

Team	1st Qt.	2nd Qt.	3rd Qt.	4th Qt.	OT	Total
Detroit	16	20	30	23	2	91
Los Angeles	18	26	24	21	10	99

=== Game Three ===
Thursday, June 10, 2004, 14:31 at The Palace of Auburn Hills.

The Pistons beat Los Angeles by 20 in their first NBA Finals appearance together at The Palace of Auburn Hills since 1989 to take a 2–1 lead in the series. The 68 points scored by the Lakers set a (post-shot clock) franchise record for the fewest points scored in a Finals game. (Even Jay Leno was upset, saying in his Tonight Show monologue: "68 points? 68 is a great score...if you're playing golf!")

Team	1st Qt.	2nd Qt.	3rd Qt.	4th Qt.	Total
Los Angeles	16	16	19	17	68
Detroit	24	15	24	25	88

=== Game Four ===
Sunday, June 13, 2004, 14:49 at The Palace of Auburn Hills.

Again, the Pistons defeated the Lakers, although this time by eight, to take a 3–1 series advantage.

Team	1st Qt.	2nd Qt.	3rd Qt.	4th Qt.	Total
Los Angeles	22	17	17	24	80
Detroit	21	20	15	32	88

=== Game Five ===
Tuesday, June 15, 2004, 14:32 at The Palace of Auburn Hills.

In Game 5, the Pistons won their first championship since 1990, and Larry Brown finally won a title as an NBA head coach. The Pistons defense had overcome the high-scoring Laker offense, winning the game by 13, winning the series 4–1, and also ending a long Laker dynasty that lasted for many years. The game saw the end of Phil Jackson's first run as the coach (he returned for the 2005–06 season), and saw O'Neal, Payton, and Malone's last games in Laker uniforms (O'Neal and Payton were both acquired by the soon-to-be NBA Champions Miami Heat and Malone retired).

Team	1st Qt.	2nd Qt.	3rd Qt.	4th Qt.	Total
Los Angeles	24	21	14	28	87
Detroit	25	30	27	18	100

== Playoff defensive records ==
As a result of their incredible defensive dominance, the 2004 Pistons set a number of notable shot-clock era (1955–present) defensive playoff records:

- Allowed under 90 points in eighteen playoff games.
- Allowed under 85 points in sixteen playoff games.
- Allowed under 80 points in eleven playoff games.
- Allowed under 75 points in six playoff games.
- Allowed under 70 points in six playoff games.
- Allowed 65 or less points in three playoff games.
- One of two teams (1998 Bulls) to allow under 60 points in a playoff game.
- Allowed under 40% FG in twelve playoff games.
- Allowed under 35% FG in five playoff games (tied with 1999 Knicks).
- Allowed under 30% FG in two playoff games (tied with 1999 Knicks).

Least Points Per Game (PPG) allowed in a shot-clock era playoff run of any length:

- The 2004 Pistons allowed 80.696 PPG, slightly lower than the 2000 Heat at 80.700 PPG allowed. Excluding overtime periods, the 2004 Pistons allowed 78.6 PPG during the playoffs in regulation compared to 79.9 PPG allowed for the 2000 Heat.

The 2004 Pistons had a Defensive Rating of 92.0 in the playoffs. This is the lowest Defensive Rating any team has had in a post-1st round playoff run in the 3-point era (1980–present). The 2000 Spurs had a 91.4 Defensive Rating, but this was in a 1st round loss of only four games.

== Player statistics ==
Legend
GP	Games played	GS	Games started	MPG	Minutes per game
FG%	Field-goal percentage	3P%	3-point field-goal percentage	FT%	Free-throw percentage
RPG	Rebounds per game	APG	Assists per game	SPG	Steals per game
BPG	Blocks per game	PPG	Points per game

=== Season ===
Player	GP	GS	MPG	FG%	3P%	FT%	RPG	APG	SPG	BPG	PPG
Chauncey Billups	78	78	35.4	.394	.388	.878	3.5	5.7	1.08	0.10	16.9
Elden Campbell	65	27	13.7	.439	–	.685	3.2	0.7	0.32	0.77	5.6
Tremaine Fowlkes	36	0	7.3	.313	.125	.722	1.5	0.4	0.25	0.08	1.2
Darvin Ham	54	2	9.0	.493	.500	.600	1.7	0.3	0.24	0.15	1.8
Richard Hamilton	78	78	35.5	.455	.265	.868	3.6	4.0	1.32	0.22	17.6
Lindsey Hunter	33	8	20.0	.343	.280	.625	2.0	2.6	1.18	0.18	3.5
Mike James*	26	0	19.7	.405	.364	.844	2.2	3.7	1.00	0.04	6.3
Darko Miličić	34	0	4.7	.262	.000	.583	1.3	0.2	0.21	0.44	1.4
Mehmet Okur	71	33	22.3	.463	.375	.775	5.9	1.0	0.51	0.89	9.6
Tayshaun Prince	82	80	32.9	.467	.363	.766	4.8	2.3	0.77	0.84	10.3
Ben Wallace	81	81	37.7	.421	.125	.490	12.4	1.7	1.77	3.04	9.5
Rasheed Wallace*	22	21	30.6	.431	.319	.704	7.0	1.8	1.09	2.05	13.7
Corliss Williamson	79	0	19.9	.505	–	.731	3.2	0.7	0.38	0.25	9.5

* Statistics include only games with the Pistons

=== Playoffs ===
Player	GP	GS	MPG	FG%	3P%	FT%	RPG	APG	SPG	BPG	PPG
Chauncey Billups	23	23	38.3	.385	.346	.890	3.0	5.9	1.35	0.09	16.4
Elden Campbell	14	0	8.9	.286	–	.556	1.8	0.7	0.43	0.64	2.1
Darvin Ham	22	0	4.9	.500	.000	–	0.6	0.0	0.14	0.18	0.7
Richard Hamilton	23	23	40.2	.447	.385	.848	4.6	4.2	1.17	0.04	21.5
Lindsey Hunter	23	0	11.9	.292	.233	.917	1.4	0.9	0.78	0.17	2.4
Mike James	22	0	8.9	.396	.429	.563	1.2	1.1	0.23	0.00	2.6
Darko Miličić	8	0	1.8	.000	–	.250	0.4	0.1	0.13	0.00	0.1
Mehmet Okur	22	0	11.5	.470	.400	.692	2.8	0.4	0.23	0.41	3.7
Tayshaun Prince	23	23	34.6	.410	.265	.745	6.0	2.3	1.09	1.35	9.9
Ben Wallace	23	23	40.2	.454	.000	.427	14.3	1.9	1.91	2.43	10.3
Rasheed Wallace	23	23	34.9	.413	.243	.767	7.8	1.6	0.57	1.96	13.0
Corliss Williamson	22	0	14.9	.364	.000	.809	2.2	0.7	0.27	0.14	5.7

== Award winners ==
- Chauncey Billups, NBA Finals Most Valuable Player Award
- Ben Wallace, All-NBA Second Team
- Ben Wallace, NBA All-Defensive First Team

== Transactions ==
=== Overview ===
Players Added

Via draft

- Darko Miličić

Via trade

- Mike James
- Rasheed Wallace

Via free agency

- Elden Campbell
- Tremaine Fowlkes
- Darvin Ham
- Lindsey Hunter
Players Lost

Via trade

- Chucky Atkins
- Michael Curry
- Željko Rebrača
- Clifford Robinson
- Pepe Sánchez
- Bob Sura

Via retirement

- Danny Manning

Waived

- Hubert Davis
- Ronald Dupree
- Justin Hamilton
- Derrick Zimmerman

=== Trades ===
August 21, 2003	To Detroit Pistons Bob Sura	To Golden State Warriors Clifford Robinson; Pepe Sánchez
August 28, 2003	To Detroit Pistons Lindsey Hunter	To Toronto Raptors Michael Curry
February 19, 2004	Three-team trade
February 19, 2004	To Atlanta Hawks Chris Mills (from Boston) Bob Sura (from Detroit) Željko Rebrača (from Detroit) 2004 first-round pick (from Milwaukee via Denver and Detroit)	To Boston Celtics Chucky Atkins (from Detroit) Lindsey Hunter (from Detroit) 2004 first-round pick (from Detroit) Cash considerations
February 19, 2004	To Detroit Pistons Mike James (from Boston) Rasheed Wallace (from Atlanta)

=== Free agency ===
==== Additions ====
Date	Player	Former team	Ref.
July 26	Elden Campbell	Seattle SuperSonics	
September 23	Darvin Ham	Atlanta Hawks	
October 28	Tremaine Fowlkes	Los Angeles Clippers	
February 26	Lindsey Hunter	Boston Celtics	

==== Subtractions ====
Date	Player	Reason	New team	Ref.
September 13	Danny Manning	Retired	—N/a	
October 22	Justin Hamilton	Waived	(Greece) Ionikos	
October 22	Derrick Zimmerman	Waived	Columbus Riverdragons	
October 23	Ronald Dupree	Waived	Chicago Bulls	
January 20	Hubert Davis	Waived	New Jersey Nets	
