= 2003–04 Milwaukee Bucks season =

NBA professional basketball team season

- Head coach: Terry Porter
- General manager: Larry Harris
- Owner: Herb Kohl
- Arena: Bradley Center

Results
- Record: 41–41 (.500)
- Place: Division: 4th (Central); Conference: 6th (Eastern)
- Playoff finish: First round (lost to Pistons 1–4)
- Stats at Basketball Reference

The 2003–04 Milwaukee Bucks season was the Bucks' 36th season in the National Basketball Association. During the offseason, the Bucks acquired Joe Smith from the Minnesota Timberwolves. Under new head coach Terry Porter, the Bucks played around .500 for most of the first half of the season. At midseason, the team traded Tim Thomas to the New York Knicks for Keith Van Horn. The young Bucks managed to play well as Michael Redd, who continued to show improvement had a breakout season averaging 21.7 points per game, while being selected for the 2004 NBA All-Star Game. However, after holding a 33–27 record as of March 3, the Bucks lost eight of their next nine games, but still managed to make the playoffs despite finishing fourth in the Central Division with a 41–41 record. Top draft pick T. J. Ford made the All-Second Rookie Team. However, the Bucks did not make it out of the first round once again, losing to the eventual champions, the Detroit Pistons, in five games.

== Draft picks ==
| Round | Pick | Player | Position | Nationality | College |
|---|---|---|---|---|---|
| 1 | 8 | T. J. Ford | PG | United States | Texas |
| 2 | 35 | Szymon Szewczyk | F | Poland | |
| 2 | 43 | Keith Bogans | SG | United States | Kentucky |

== Roster ==
2003–04 Milwaukee Bucks roster
Players

| Pos. | No. | Player | Height | Weight | DOB | From |
|---|---|---|---|---|---|---|
| G | 11 | T. J. Ford (injured) | 6 ft 0 in (1.83 m) | 165 lb (75 kg) | 1983–03–24 | Texas |
| C | 50 | Dan Gadzuric | 6 ft 11 in (2.11 m) | 245 lb (111 kg) | 1978–02–02 | UCLA |
| F/C | 12 | Marcus Haislip | 6 ft 10 in (2.08 m) | 230 lb (104 kg) | 1980–12–22 | Tennessee |
| G | 19 | Damon Jones | 6 ft 3 in (1.91 m) | 185 lb (84 kg) | 1976–08–25 | Houston |
| G | 6 | Brevin Knight | 5 ft 10 in (1.78 m) | 173 lb (78 kg) | 1975–11–08 | Stanford |
| F | 7 | Toni Kukoč | 6 ft 10 in (2.08 m) | 192 lb (87 kg) | 1968–09–18 | Croatia |
| G/F | 24 | Desmond Mason | 6 ft 5 in (1.96 m) | 222 lb (101 kg) | 1977–10–11 | Oklahoma State |
| G/F | 22 | Michael Redd | 6 ft 6 in (1.98 m) | 215 lb (98 kg) | 1979–08–24 | Ohio State |
| C | 15 | Daniel Santiago | 7 ft 1 in (2.16 m) | 260 lb (118 kg) | 1976–06–24 | Saint Vincent |
| PF | 54 | Brian Skinner | 6 ft 9 in (2.06 m) | 255 lb (116 kg) | 1976–05–19 | Baylor |
| PF | 8 | Joe Smith | 6 ft 10 in (2.08 m) | 225 lb (102 kg) | 1975–07–26 | Maryland |
| G | 20 | Erick Strickland | 6 ft 3 in (1.91 m) | 210 lb (95 kg) | 1973–11–25 | Nebraska |
| F | 44 | Keith Van Horn | 6 ft 10 in (2.08 m) | 240 lb (109 kg) | 1975–10–23 | Utah |

Coaches
Head coach
- Terry Porter
Assistant(s)
- Sam Mitchell
- Bob Ociepka
- Mike Schuler
- Jim Todd

Legend
- (DP) Unsigned draft pick
- (FA) Free agent
- (S) Suspended
- Injured

Roster

=== Roster Notes ===
- Center Daniel Santiago played for the Puerto Rican national team, but he also holds American citizenship.

== Regular season ==
=== Season standings ===
| Central Division | W | L | PCT | GB | Home | Road | Div |
|---|---|---|---|---|---|---|---|
| y-Indiana Pacers | 61 | 21 | .744 | – | 34–7 | 27–14 | 20–8 |
| x-Detroit Pistons | 54 | 28 | .659 | 7 | 31–10 | 23–18 | 17–11 |
| x-New Orleans Hornets | 41 | 41 | .500 | 20 | 25–16 | 16–25 | 14–14 |
| x-Milwaukee Bucks | 41 | 41 | .500 | 20 | 27–14 | 14–27 | 15–13 |
| e-Cleveland Cavaliers | 35 | 47 | .427 | 26 | 23–18 | 12–29 | 14–14 |
| e-Toronto Raptors | 33 | 49 | .402 | 28 | 18–23 | 15–26 | 11–17 |
| e-Atlanta Hawks | 28 | 54 | .341 | 33 | 18–23 | 10–31 | 10–18 |
| e-Chicago Bulls | 23 | 59 | .280 | 38 | 14–27 | 9–32 | 11–17 |

| # | Eastern Conference | | | | |
| # | Team | W | L | PCT | GB |
|---|---|---|---|---|---|
| 1 | z-Indiana Pacers | 61 | 21 | .744 | – |
| 2 | y-New Jersey Nets | 47 | 35 | .573 | 14 |
| 3 | x-Detroit Pistons | 54 | 28 | .659 | 7 |
| 4 | x-Miami Heat | 42 | 40 | .512 | 19 |
| 5 | x-New Orleans Hornets | 41 | 41 | .500 | 20 |
| 6 | x-Milwaukee Bucks | 41 | 41 | .500 | 20 |
| 7 | x-New York Knicks | 39 | 43 | .476 | 22 |
| 8 | x-Boston Celtics | 36 | 46 | .439 | 25 |
| 9 | e-Cleveland Cavaliers | 35 | 47 | .427 | 26 |
| 10 | e-Toronto Raptors | 33 | 49 | .402 | 28 |
| 11 | e-Philadelphia 76ers | 33 | 49 | .402 | 28 |
| 12 | e-Atlanta Hawks | 28 | 54 | .341 | 33 |
| 13 | e-Washington Wizards | 25 | 57 | .305 | 36 |
| 14 | e-Chicago Bulls | 23 | 59 | .280 | 38 |
| 15 | e-Orlando Magic | 21 | 61 | .256 | 40 |

z - clinched division title
y - clinched division title
x - clinched playoff spot

=== Game log ===
2003–04 game log
Total: 41–41 (home: 0–0; road: 0–0)
October: 0–0 (home: 0–0; road: 0–0)

| Game | Date | Team | Score | High points | High rebounds | High assists | Location Attendance | Record |

November: 0–0 (home: 0–0; road: 0–0)

| Game | Date | Team | Score | High points | High rebounds | High assists | Location Attendance | Record |

December: 0–0 (home: 0–0; road: 0–0)

| Game | Date | Team | Score | High points | High rebounds | High assists | Location Attendance | Record |

January: 0–0 (home: 0–0; road: 0–0)

| Game | Date | Team | Score | High points | High rebounds | High assists | Location Attendance | Record |

February: 0–0 (home: 0–0; road: 0–0)

| Game | Date | Team | Score | High points | High rebounds | High assists | Location Attendance | Record |

March: 0–0 (home: 0–0; road: 0–0)

| Game | Date | Team | Score | High points | High rebounds | High assists | Location Attendance | Record |

April: 0–0 (home: 0–0; road: 0–0)

| Game | Date | Team | Score | High points | High rebounds | High assists | Location Attendance | Record |

2003–04 schedule

== Playoffs ==
2004 playoff game log
First Round: 1–4 (home: 0–2; road: 1–2)

| Game | Date | Team | Score | High points | High rebounds | High assists | Location Attendance | Series |
|---|---|---|---|---|---|---|---|---|
| 1 | April 18 | @ Detroit | L 82–108 | Desmond Mason (16) | Joe Smith (11) | Damon Jones (7) | The Palace of Auburn Hills; 22,076 | 0–1 |
| 2 | April 21 | @ Detroit | W 92–88 | Michael Redd (26) | Joe Smith (13) | Damon Jones (7) | The Palace of Auburn Hills; 22,076 | 1–1 |
| 3 | April 24 | Detroit | L 85–95 | Mason, Redd (19) | Desmond Mason (9) | Damon Jones (7) | Bradley Center; 18,717 | 1–2 |
| 4 | April 26 | Detroit | L 92–109 | Smith, Jones (17) | Joe Smith (12) | Damon Jones (10) | Bradley Center; 17,316 | 1–3 |
| 5 | April 29 | @ Detroit | L 77–91 | Michael Redd (22) | Keith Van Horn (12) | Damon Jones (6) | The Palace of Auburn Hills; 22,076 | 1–4 |

2004 schedule

== Player statistics ==
Legend
| GP | Games played | GS | Games started | MPG | Minutes per game |
| FG% | Field-goal percentage | 3P% | 3-point field-goal percentage | FT% | Free-throw percentage |
| RPG | Rebounds per game | APG | Assists per game | SPG | Steals per game |
| BPG | Blocks per game | PPG | Points per game |

=== Season ===
| Player | GP | GS | MPG | FG% | 3FG% | FT% | RPG | APG | SPG | BPG | PPG |
|---|---|---|---|---|---|---|---|---|---|---|---|
| Michael Redd | 82 | 82 | 36.8 | 44.0 | 35.0 | 86.8 | 5.0 | 2.3 | 1.0 | 0.1 | 21.7 |
| Keith Van Horn | 25 | 15 | 30.6 | 47.2 | 45.8 | 94.5 | 6.3 | 1.5 | 0.6 | 0.6 | 15.7 |
| Desmond Mason | 82 | 31 | 30.9 | 47.2 | 23.1 | 76.9 | 4.4 | 1.9 | 0.7 | 0.3 | 14.4 |
| Tim Thomas | 42 | 42 | 32.0 | 44.3 | 36.2 | 76.2 | 4.9 | 2.1 | 1.0 | 0.4 | 14.1 |
| Joe Smith | 76 | 76 | 29.7 | 43.9 | 20.0 | 85.9 | 8.5 | 1.0 | 0.6 | 1.2 | 10.9 |
| Brian Skinner | 56 | 54 | 28.2 | 49.7 | 0.0 | 57.2 | 7.3 | 0.9 | 0.5 | 1.1 | 10.5 |
| Toni Kukoč | 73 | 0 | 20.8 | 41.7 | 29.2 | 72.9 | 3.7 | 2.7 | 0.8 | 0.3 | 8.4 |
| T. J. Ford | 55 | 55 | 26.8 | 38.4 | 23.8 | 81.6 | 3.2 | 6.5 | 1.1 | 0.1 | 7.1 |
| Damon Jones | 82 | 26 | 24.6 | 40.1 | 35.9 | 76.4 | 2.1 | 5.8 | 0.4 | 0.0 | 7.0 |
| Brevin Knight | 21 | 1 | 20.0 | 43.8 | 33.3 | 78.9 | 2.3 | 4.7 | 1.4 | 0.0 | 5.9 |
| Dan Gadzuric | 75 | 0 | 16.8 | 52.4 | 0.0 | 49.2 | 4.6 | 0.4 | 0.7 | 1.4 | 5.7 |
| Erick Strickland | 43 | 0 | 13.3 | 40.3 | 43.9 | 86.3 | 1.7 | 2.1 | 0.6 | 0.0 | 5.4 |
| Daniel Santiago | 54 | 28 | 13.1 | 47.9 | 0.0 | 67.8 | 2.4 | 0.4 | 0.4 | 0.4 | 4.0 |
| Dan Langhi | 2 | 0 | 10.0 | 37.5 | 50.0 | 0.0 | 0.5 | 0.0 | 0.0 | 0.0 | 3.5 |
| Marcus Haislip | 31 | 0 | 8.5 | 48.6 | 50.0 | 71.4 | 1.7 | 0.1 | 0.2 | 0.4 | 3.0 |
| Joel Przybilla | 5 | 0 | 6.6 | 0.0 | 0.0 | 50.0 | 2.0 | 0.6 | 0.0 | 0.0 | 0.2 |

=== Playoffs ===
| Player | GP | GS | MPG | FG% | 3FG% | FT% | RPG | APG | SPG | BPG | PPG |
|---|---|---|---|---|---|---|---|---|---|---|---|
| Michael Redd | 5 | 5 | 38.4 | 41.0 | 30.0 | 76.2 | 5.0 | 2.6 | 0.0 | 0.0 | 18.0 |
| Desmond Mason | 5 | 5 | 39.6 | 33.8 | 0.0 | 84.6 | 4.8 | 2.4 | 0.8 | 0.4 | 14.4 |
| Joe Smith | 5 | 5 | 35.0 | 49.1 | 0.0 | 92.3 | 10.0 | 0.4 | 0.8 | 2.0 | 13.2 |
| Damon Jones | 5 | 5 | 28.8 | 52.9 | 47.6 | 66.7 | 4.0 | 7.4 | 1.0 | 0.0 | 10.0 |
| Toni Kukoč | 5 | 0 | 21.0 | 50.0 | 33.3 | 50.0 | 2.8 | 0.8 | 0.6 | 0.4 | 8.4 |
| Keith Van Horn | 5 | 2 | 27.4 | 33.3 | 36.4 | 66.7 | 4.6 | 1.4 | 1.4 | 0.6 | 8.0 |
| Brian Skinner | 5 | 3 | 18.8 | 52.4 | 0.0 | 41.7 | 4.4 | 0.0 | 0.2 | 0.6 | 5.4 |
| Erick Strickland | 3 | 0 | 13.7 | 41.7 | 0.0 | 100.0 | 1.7 | 3.0 | 0.7 | 0.0 | 4.7 |
| Brevin Knight | 5 | 0 | 20.2 | 26.1 | 0.0 | 81.8 | 2.2 | 3.4 | 2.8 | 0.2 | 4.2 |
| Dan Gadzuric | 1 | 0 | 9.0 | 50.0 | 0.0 | 0.0 | 1.0 | 2.0 | 1.0 | 0.0 | 4.0 |
| Marcus Haislip | 1 | 0 | 3.0 | 100.0 | 0.0 | 0.0 | 1.0 | 0.0 | 0.0 | 0.0 | 2.0 |
| Daniel Santiago | 1 | 0 | 1.0 | 0.0 | 0.0 | 0.0 | 0.0 | 0.0 | 0.0 | 0.0 | 0.0 |

== Transactions ==
=== Trades ===
| June 27, 2003 | To Milwaukee Bucks Anthony Peeler; Joe Smith | To Minnesota Timberwolves Sam Cassell; Ervin Johnson |
| February 15, 2004 | To Milwaukee Bucks Keith Van Horn | To Atlanta Hawks Michael Doleac; Joel Przybilla To New York Knicks Nazr Mohammed; Tim Thomas |

=== Free agents ===
| Player | Signed | Former team |
| Daniel Santiago | July 17, 2003 | Lottomatica Roma |
| Brian Skinner | July 17, 2003 | Philadelphia 76ers |
| Erick Strickland | July 17, 2003 | Indiana Pacers |
| Damon Jones | July 23, 2003 | Sacramento Kings |
| Dan Langhi | December 5, 2003 | Golden State Warriors |

== See also ==
- 2003-04 NBA season
