= 2003–04 New Jersey Nets season =

NBA professional basketball team season

- Division champions
- Head coach: Byron Scott; Lawrence Frank
- Arena: Continental Airlines Arena

Results
- Record: 47–35 (.573)
- Place: Division: 1st (Atlantic); Conference: 2nd (Eastern)
- Playoff finish: Conference semifinals (lost to Pistons 3–4)
- Stats at Basketball Reference

The 2003–04 New Jersey Nets season was the Nets' 37th season in the National Basketball Association, and 28th season in East Rutherford, New Jersey. After speculating that he would sign with the defending champion San Antonio Spurs in the off-season, Jason Kidd signed a 6-year, $99 million deal to stay with the Nets.

The team acquired All-Star center and two-time Defensive Player of the Year Alonzo Mourning, who had missed all of the previous season due to his worsening kidney condition. However, after just twelve games, Mourning retired on November 25, 2003, due to complications from his kidney disease.

After a 22–20 start to the season, Byron Scott was fired as head coach and was replaced with Lawrence Frank, as the Nets went on a 14-game winning streak at midseason. With Frank as interim head coach, the Nets overcame adversity, ending the season with a 47–35 record. Despite this, the Nets still managed to repeat as Division Champions and earn the number 2 spot in the Eastern Conference.

After sweeping the New York Knicks in the opening round of the playoffs, the second round pitted the Nets against the Detroit Pistons in last year's Conference championship rematch. However, Detroit would get revenge this time, and would eventually win the series in seven games, ending the 2003–04 season for the Nets. The Pistons would go on to defeat the Los Angeles Lakers in the 2004 NBA Finals to win their third NBA championship.

Following the season, Kenyon Martin was traded to the Denver Nuggets, Kerry Kittles was traded to the Los Angeles Clippers, and Rodney Rogers signed as a free agent with the New Orleans Hornets. Martin and Kidd both represented the Eastern Conference at the 2004 NBA All-Star Game, which was held in Los Angeles. This was Kenyon Martin's only All-Star game appearance.

== Offseason ==
=== Draft picks ===
Round	Pick	Player	Position	Nationality	College
1	22	Zoran Planinić	SG	Croatia	
2	51	Kyle Korver	SF	United States	Creighton

== Roster ==
2003–04 New Jersey Nets roster
Players

Pos.	No.	Player	Height	Weight	DOB	From
G	1	Brandon Armstrong	6 ft 4 in (1.93 m)	188 lb (85 kg)	1980-06-16	Pepperdine
C	35	Jason Collins	7 ft 0 in (2.13 m)	255 lb (116 kg)	1978-12-02	Stanford
G	44	Hubert Davis (injured)	6 ft 5 in (1.96 m)	183 lb (83 kg)	1970-05-17	North Carolina
G	12	Lucious Harris	6 ft 5 in (1.96 m)	190 lb (86 kg)	1970-12-18	Long Beach State
F	24	Richard Jefferson	6 ft 7 in (2.01 m)	230 lb (104 kg)	1980-06-21	Arizona
G	5	Jason Kidd	6 ft 4 in (1.93 m)	210 lb (95 kg)	1973-03-23	California
G	30	Kerry Kittles	6 ft 5 in (1.96 m)	179 lb (81 kg)	1974-06-12	Villanova
F	6	Kenyon Martin	6 ft 9 in (2.06 m)	225 lb (102 kg)	1977-12-30	Cincinnati
C	33	Alonzo Mourning (injured)	6 ft 10 in (2.08 m)	240 lb (109 kg)	1970-02-08	Georgetown
G	10	Zoran Planinić	6 ft 7 in (2.01 m)	210 lb (95 kg)	1982-09-12	Croatia
F	54	Rodney Rogers	6 ft 7 in (2.01 m)	235 lb (107 kg)	1971-06-20	Wake Forest
F	21	Brian Scalabrine	6 ft 9 in (2.06 m)	235 lb (107 kg)	1978-03-18	USC
G	8	Tamar Slay	6 ft 8 in (2.03 m)	215 lb (98 kg)	1980-04-02	Marshall
F/C	34	Aaron Williams	6 ft 9 in (2.06 m)	220 lb (100 kg)	1971-10-02	Xavier

Coaches
Head coach
- Lawrence Frank
Assistant(s)
- Tom Barrise
- Larry Drew
- Brian Hill
- Don Newman

Legend
- (DP) Unsigned draft pick
- (FA) Free agent
- (S) Suspended
- Injured

Roster

Roster notes

- Center Alonzo Mourning retired on November 25.

== Regular season ==
=== Season standings ===
Atlantic Division	W	L	PCT	GB	Home	Road	Div
y-New Jersey Nets	47	35	.573	–	28–13	19–22	18–7
x-Miami Heat	42	40	.512	5	29–12	13–28	15–10
x-New York Knicks	39	43	.476	8	23–18	16–25	15–7
x-Boston Celtics	36	46	.439	11	19–22	17–24	14–10
e-Philadelphia 76ers	33	49	.402	14	21–20	12–29	10–14
e-Washington Wizards	25	57	.305	22	17–24	8–33	3–21
e-Orlando Magic	21	61	.256	26	11–30	10–31	8–16

#	Eastern Conference				
#	Team	W	L	PCT	GB
1	z-Indiana Pacers	61	21	.744	–
2	y-New Jersey Nets	47	35	.573	14
3	x-Detroit Pistons	54	28	.659	7
4	x-Miami Heat	42	40	.512	19
5	x-New Orleans Hornets	41	41	.500	20
6	x-Milwaukee Bucks	41	41	.500	20
7	x-New York Knicks	39	43	.476	22
8	x-Boston Celtics	36	46	.439	25
9	e-Cleveland Cavaliers	35	47	.427	26
10	e-Toronto Raptors	33	49	.402	28
11	e-Philadelphia 76ers	33	49	.402	28
12	e-Atlanta Hawks	28	54	.341	33
13	e-Washington Wizards	25	57	.305	36
14	e-Chicago Bulls	23	59	.280	38
15	e-Orlando Magic	21	61	.256	40

z – clinched division title
y – clinched division title
x – clinched playoff spot

== Playoffs ==
2004 playoff game log
First round: 4–0 (home: 2–0; road: 2–0)

Game	Date	Team	Score	High points	High rebounds	High assists	Location Attendance	Series
1	April 17	New York	W 107–83	Richard Jefferson (21)	Kenyon Martin (12)	Jason Kidd (13)	Continental Airlines Arena; 18,206	1–0
2	April 20	New York	W 99–81	Kenyon Martin (22)	Kenyon Martin (16)	Jason Kidd (8)	Continental Airlines Arena; 19,918	2–0
3	April 22	@ New York	W 81–78	Martin, Kidd (19)	Kenyon Martin (15)	Richard Jefferson (10)	Madison Square Garden; 19,763	3–0
4	April 25	@ New York	W 100–94	Kenyon Martin (36)	Kenyon Martin (13)	Jason Kidd (7)	Madison Square Garden; 19,763	4–0

Conference Semi-finals: 3–4 (home: 2–1; road: 1–3)

Game	Date	Team	Score	High points	High rebounds	High assists	Location Attendance	Series
1	May 3	@ Detroit	L 56–78	Kerry Kittles (15)	Jason Kidd (7)	Jason Kidd (6)	The Palace of Auburn Hills; 22,076	0–1
2	May 7	@ Detroit	L 80–95	Jefferson, Martin (19)	Jason Collins (10)	Jason Kidd (11)	The Palace of Auburn Hills; 22,076	0–2
3	May 9	Detroit	W 82–64	Richard Jefferson (30)	Kenyon Martin (9)	Jason Kidd (12)	Continental Airlines Arena; 19,000	1–2
4	May 11	Detroit	W 94–79	Jason Kidd (22)	Kenyon Martin (15)	Jason Kidd (11)	Continental Airlines Arena; 19,860	2–2
5	May 14	@ Detroit	W 127–120 (3OT)	Richard Jefferson (31)	Jefferson, Kittles (11)	Jason Kidd (8)	The Palace of Auburn Hills; 22,076	3–2
6	May 16	Detroit	L 75–81	Richard Jefferson (23)	Jefferson, Martin (7)	Jason Kidd (8)	Continental Airlines Arena; 19,968	3–3
7	May 20	@ Detroit	L 69–90	Kerry Kittles (18)	Kenyon Martin (12)	Jason Kidd (7)	The Palace of Auburn Hills; 22,076	3–4

2004 schedule

== Player statistics ==
Legend
GP	Games played	GS	Games started	MPG	Minutes per game
FG%	Field-goal percentage	3P%	3-point field-goal percentage	FT%	Free-throw percentage
RPG	Rebounds per game	APG	Assists per game	SPG	Steals per game
BPG	Blocks per game	PPG	Points per game

=== Regular season ===
New Jersey Nets statistics
Player	GP	GS	MPG	FG%	3P%	FT%	RPG	APG	SPG	BPG	PPG
Richard Jefferson	82	82	38.2	.498	.364	.763	5.7	3.8	1.1	0.3	18.5
Kenyon Martin	65	62	34.6	.488	.280	.684	9.5	2.5	1.5	1.3	16.7
Jason Kidd	67	66	36.6	.384	.321	.827	6.4	9.2	1.8	0.2	15.5
Kerry Kittles	82	82	34.7	.453	.351	.787	4.0	2.5	1.5	0.5	13.1
Alonzo Mourning	12	0	17.9	.465		.882	2.3	0.7	0.2	0.5	8.0
Rodney Rogers	69	15	20.4	.410	.329	.765	4.4	2.0	0.9	0.4	7.8
Lucious Harris	69	15	21.8	.404	.376	.846	2.0	2.0	0.6	0.0	6.9
Aaron Williams	72	7	18.6	.503	.333	.677	4.1	1.1	0.5	0.6	6.3
Jason Collins	78	78	28.5	.424	.000	.739	5.1	2.0	0.9	0.7	5.9
Brian Scalabrine	69	2	13.4	.394	.244	.829	2.5	0.9	0.3	0.2	3.5
Zoran Planinic	49	1	9.7	.411	.281	.633	1.1	1.4	0.3	0.1	3.1
Brandon Armstrong	56	0	7.8	.371	.365	.500	0.8	0.3	0.2	0.0	2.7
Tamar Slay	22	0	7.5	.350	.333	.500	1.1	0.6	0.3	0.0	2.4
Robert Pack	26	0	8.5	.423		.833	0.7	1.0	0.5	0.0	1.9
Doug Overton	6	0	3.7	.375		1.000	0.2	0.7	0.2	0.0	1.3
Damone Brown	3	0	5.7	.100		.500	1.7	0.0	0.7	0.0	1.0
Anthony Goldwire	6	0	3.2	.250	.000		0.2	0.2	0.3	0.0	0.7
Mikki Moore	4	0	2.5	.200			0.5	0.0	0.0	0.0	0.5
Hubert Davis	14	0	3.9	.111		1.000	0.6	0.2	0.1	0.0	0.3

=== Playoffs ===
New Jersey Nets statistics
Player	GP	GS	MPG	FG%	3P%	FT%	RPG	APG	SPG	BPG	PPG
Richard Jefferson	11	11	41.8	.418	.273	.713	6.3	3.8	1.3	0.7	19.8
Kenyon Martin	11	11	37.2	.533	.000	.750	11.0	1.1	1.2	1.3	19.1
Kerry Kittles	11	11	37.7	.448	.327	.618	4.3	2.1	2.0	0.9	14.4
Jason Kidd	11	11	43.1	.333	.208	.811	6.6	9.0	2.3	0.5	12.6
Rodney Rogers	11	0	20.7	.319	.227	.800	5.0	1.1	0.5	0.3	6.1
Lucious Harris	11	0	16.5	.388	.250	.778	2.0	0.9	0.6	0.1	5.0
Aaron Williams	11	0	13.5	.545		.600	2.0	0.4	0.0	0.6	3.8
Jason Collins	11	11	24.2	.368		.750	4.0	1.5	0.3	0.9	3.6
Brian Scalabrine	9	0	8.1	.647	.833	.500	1.3	0.1	0.3	0.0	3.3
Brandon Armstrong	8	0	4.0	.250	.000		0.3	0.4	0.1	0.0	0.8
Tamar Slay	6	0	2.0	.200	.000	1.000	0.3	0.0	0.2	0.0	0.7
Zoran Planinic	6	0	2.5	.000	.000	.500	0.2	0.3	0.0	0.0	0.2

Player Statistics Citation;

== Awards and records ==
- Jason Kidd, All-NBA First Team
- Jason Kidd, NBA All-Defensive Second Team

== Transactions ==
=== Free agents ===
Additions
Player	Date signed	Former team
Alonzo Mourning	July 16	Miami Heat
Doug Overton	September 30	FC Barcelona
Damone Brown	September 30	North Charleston Lowgators (NBDL)
Mikki Moore	December 22	Roanoke Dazzle (NBDL)
Robert Pack	January 19	New Orleans Hornets
Hubert Davis	January 26	Detroit Pistons
Anthony Goldwire	March 22	Minnesota Timberwolves

Subtractions
Player	Date waived	New Team
Dikembe Mutombo	October 7	New York Knicks
Doug Overton	November 13	Los Angeles Clippers
Damone Brown	December 22	none
Mikki Moore	January 7	Utah Jazz
Robert Pack	January 26	Žalgiris Kaunas
Anthony Goldwire	April 6	Criollos de Caguas

== See also ==
- 2003–04 NBA season
