= 2003–04 Toronto Raptors season =

NBA professional basketball team season

- Head coach: Kevin O'Neill
- General manager: Glen Grunwald (fired) (through April 1, 2004); Jack McCloskey (interim) (after April 1, 2004)
- Owners: Maple Leaf Sports & Entertainment
- Arena: Air Canada Centre

Results
- Record: 33–49 (.402)
- Place: Division: 6th (Central); Conference: 10th (Eastern)
- Playoff finish: Did not qualify
- Stats at Basketball Reference

Local media
- Television: Rogers Sportsnet; Raptors NBA TV; TSN; The Score
- Radio: CJCL

The 2003–04 Toronto Raptors season was the Raptors' ninth season in the National Basketball Association. This season saw the team draft future All-Star forward Chris Bosh with the fourth overall pick in the 2003 NBA draft. With new head coach Kevin O'Neill, the Raptors started the season on a high note beating the 2-time Eastern Conference Champion New Jersey Nets 90–87. However, a few days later they would set an embarrassing post shot clock record by scoring just 56 points in a loss to the Minnesota Timberwolves. After the first month of the season, they traded Antonio Davis and Jerome Williams to the Chicago Bulls for Jalen Rose and Donyell Marshall. The Raptors posted a 25–25 record at the All-Star break, but largely because of injuries, they only won just eight for the rest of the season. The team also posted nine and seven-game losing streaks respectively, finishing sixth in the Central Division with a 33–49 record.

Following the season, O'Neil and General Manager Glen Grunwald were fired by the Raptors. This was also Vince Carter's final full season in Toronto, as he would be traded to the New Jersey Nets midway through next season. He was also selected for the 2004 NBA All-Star Game.

For the season, they added new red road alternate uniforms with black and grey side panels to their jerseys and shorts. They were designed by singer Shania Twain, their alternate uniforms remained in use until 2006, when they became primary road jersey remained in used until 2015.

== NBA draft ==
Round	Pick	Player	Position	Nationality	College
1	4	Chris Bosh	Forward/Center	United States	Georgia Tech
2	52	Remon van de Hare	Center	Netherlands	FC Barcelona (Spain)

== Roster ==
Toronto Raptors roster
Players

Pos.	No.	Player	Height	Weight	DOB	From
C	34	Robert Archibald	6 ft 11 in (2.11 m)	250 lb (113 kg)	1980-03-29	Illinois
C	44	Corie Blount	6 ft 9 in (2.06 m)	240 lb (109 kg)	1969-01-04	Cincinnati
C	4	Chris Bosh	6 ft 11 in (2.11 m)	235 lb (107 kg)	1984-03-24	Georgia Tech
SG	15	Vince Carter	6 ft 6 in (1.98 m)	220 lb (100 kg)	1977-01-26	North Carolina
SF	12	Michael Curry	6 ft 5 in (1.96 m)	210 lb (95 kg)	1968-08-22	Georgia Southern
SG	22	Dion Glover	6 ft 5 in (1.96 m)	225 lb (102 kg)	1978-10-22	Georgia Tech
PF	42	Donyell Marshall	6 ft 9 in (2.06 m)	245 lb (111 kg)	1973-05-18	Connecticut
SG	31	Roger Mason	6 ft 5 in (1.96 m)	205 lb (93 kg)	1980-09-10	Virginia
PF	6	Jérôme Moïso	6 ft 10 in (2.08 m)	240 lb (109 kg)	1978-06-15	UCLA
SF	21	Lamond Murray	6 ft 7 in (2.01 m)	236 lb (107 kg)	1973-04-20	California
PG	10	Milt Palacio	6 ft 4 in (1.93 m)	210 lb (95 kg)	1978-02-07	Colorado State
SF	24	Morris Peterson	6 ft 7 in (2.01 m)	220 lb (100 kg)	1977-08-26	Michigan State
SG	5	Jalen Rose	6 ft 8 in (2.03 m)	215 lb (98 kg)	1973-01-30	Michigan
PG	1	Rod Strickland	6 ft 3 in (1.91 m)	175 lb (79 kg)	1966-07-11	DePaul
SG	20	Alvin Williams	6 ft 5 in (1.96 m)	185 lb (84 kg)	1974-08-06	Villanova

Coaches
Head coach
- Kevin O'Neill
Assistant(s)
- Bob Beyer
- Shaun Brown
- Tony Brown
- Ron Oliver
- Jim Sann
- Jay Triano

Legend
- (DP) Unsigned draft pick
- (FA) Free agent
- (S) Suspended
- Injured

Roster
Updated: March 12, 2004

== Regular season ==
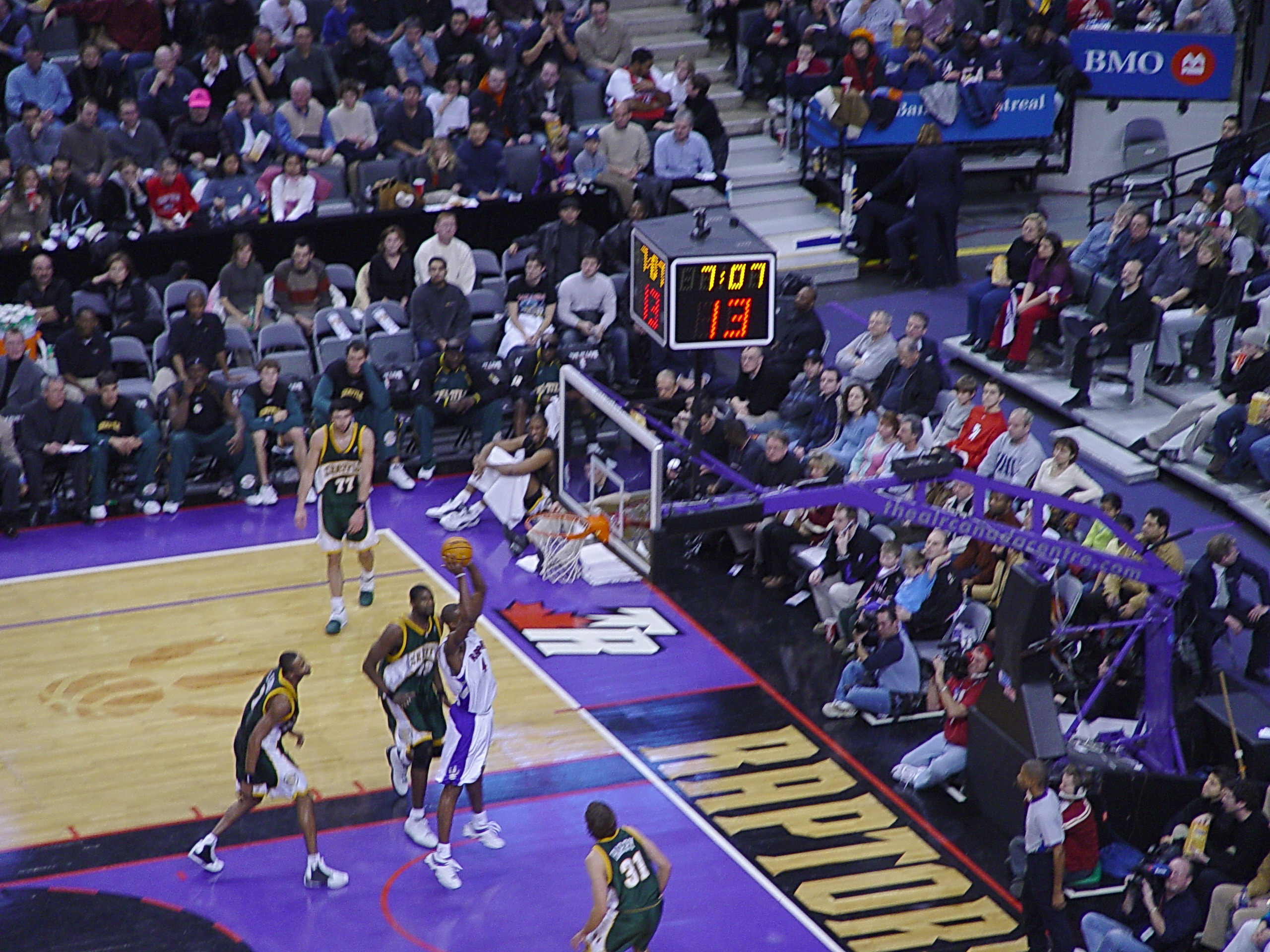
Chris Bosh attempting a shot in the key during a home game against the SuperSonics in December 2003

=== Highs ===
After acquiring Jalen Rose in a mid-November deal, the Raptors went on to win five straight games.

=== Lows ===
After the 50 game mark, the Raptors were 25-25 and in position for a playoff spot. Unfortunately, the team would struggle out towards the end, finishing 8-24 and missing the playoffs. Kevin O'Neill was fired after the season.

=== Standings ===
Central Division	W	L	PCT	GB	Home	Road	Div
y-Indiana Pacers	61	21	.744	–	34–7	27–14	20–8
x-Detroit Pistons	54	28	.659	7	31–10	23–18	17–11
x-New Orleans Hornets	41	41	.500	20	25–16	16–25	14–14
x-Milwaukee Bucks	41	41	.500	20	27–14	14–27	15–13
e-Cleveland Cavaliers	35	47	.427	26	23–18	12–29	14–14
e-Toronto Raptors	33	49	.402	28	18–23	15–26	11–17
e-Atlanta Hawks	28	54	.341	33	18–23	10–31	10–18
e-Chicago Bulls	23	59	.280	38	14–27	9–32	11–17

#	Eastern Conference				
#	Team	W	L	PCT	GB
1	z-Indiana Pacers	61	21	.744	–
2	y-New Jersey Nets	47	35	.573	14
3	x-Detroit Pistons	54	28	.659	7
4	x-Miami Heat	42	40	.512	19
5	x-New Orleans Hornets	41	41	.500	20
6	x-Milwaukee Bucks	41	41	.500	20
7	x-New York Knicks	39	43	.476	22
8	x-Boston Celtics	36	46	.439	25
9	e-Cleveland Cavaliers	35	47	.427	26
10	e-Toronto Raptors	33	49	.402	28
11	e-Philadelphia 76ers	33	49	.402	28
12	e-Atlanta Hawks	28	54	.341	33
13	e-Washington Wizards	25	57	.305	36
14	e-Chicago Bulls	23	59	.280	38
15	e-Orlando Magic	21	61	.256	40

=== Game log ===
2003–04 game log
October: 2–0 (home: 2–0; road: 0–0)

Game	Date	Team	Score	High points	High rebounds	High assists	Location Attendance	Record
1	October 29	New Jersey	W 90–87	Vince Carter (39)	Antonio Davis, Jerome Williams (14)	Lamond Murray, Milt Palacio (4)	Air Canada Centre; 18,217	1–0
2	October 31	Washington	W 82–79	Vince Carter (26)	Antonio Davis (15)	Milt Palacio, Alvin Williams (6)	Air Canada Centre; 14,183	2–0

November: 6–8 (home: 3–2; road: 3–6)

Game	Date	Team	Score	High points	High rebounds	High assists	Location Attendance	Record
3	November 1	@ Minnesota	L 56–73	Vince Carter (15)	Jerome Williams (16)	Vince Carter, Alvin Williams (3)	Target Center; 15,869	2–1
4	November 6	Dallas	W 77–71	Vince Carter (19)	Antonio Davis (12)	Milt Palacio (7)	Air Canada Centre; 17,556	3–1
5	November 7	@ Washington	L 60–86	Vince Carter (18)	Jerome Williams (13)	Alvin Williams (6)	MCI Center; 20,173	3–2
6	November 9	Denver	W 89–76	Vince Carter (34)	Jerome Williams (13)	Vince Carter, Milt Palacio (6)	Air Canada Centre; 16,888	4–2
7	November 11	@ Portland	L 80–83	Vince Carter (33)	Antonio Davis (11)	Milt Palacio (10)	Rose Garden; 14,082	4–3
8	November 12	@ L.A. Lakers	L 79–94	Vince Carter (23)	Chris Bosh, Antonio Davis, Jerome Williams (8)	Vince Carter, Milt Palacio (4)	Staples Center; 18,997	4–4
9	November 14	@ Sacramento	L 64–94	Vince Carter, Lamond Murray (13)	Antonio Davis (10)	Milt Palacio, Morris Peterson, Alvin Williams (2)	ARCO Arena; 17,317	4–5
10	November 16	Houston	W 101–97 (2OT)	Chris Bosh (25)	Jerome Williams (11)	Vince Carter (9)	Air Canada Centre; 19,547	5–5
11	November 19	Philadelphia	L 75–81	Vince Carter (20)	Antonio Davis (9)	Vince Carter (7)	Air Canada Centre; 19,800	5–6
12	November 22	@ New Jersey	W 81–80	Vince Carter (21)	Chris Bosh, Vince Carter, Jerome Williams (6)	Vince Carter (9)	Continental Airlines Arena; 13,755	6–6
13	November 23	Milwaukee	L 62–82	Vince Carter (15)	Antonio Davis, Jerome Williams (9)	Alvin Williams (6)	Air Canada Centre; 17,702	6–7
14	November 26	@ Atlanta	W 99–97 (OT)	Vince Carter (43)	Antonio Davis (11)	Alvin Williams (6)	Philips Arena; 11,730	7–7
15	November 28	@ Orlando	W 87–86	Vince Carter (20)	Chris Bosh, Antonio Davis (8)	Vince Carter (8)	TD Waterhouse Centre; 13,375	8–7
16	November 29	@ Miami	L 66–78	Lamond Murray (14)	Chris Bosh (10)	Milt Palacio, Alvin Williams (3)	American Airlines Arena; 14,585	8–8

December: 8–6 (home: 4–2; road: 4–4)

Game	Date	Team	Score	High points	High rebounds	High assists	Location Attendance	Record
17	December 2	@ Philadelphia	W 95–88	Donyell Marshall (27)	Chris Bosh (11)	Vince Carter (12)	Wachovia Center; 17,899	9–8
18	December 3	Boston	W 105–95	Vince Carter, Donyell Marshall (21)	Lonny Baxter (9)	Vince Carter (10)	Air Canada Centre; 18,552	10–8
19	December 5	Atlanta	W 92–87	Vince Carter, Jalen Rose (22)	Jalen Rose (8)	Jalen Rose (10)	Air Canada Centre; 17,559	11–8
20	December 7	Seattle	W 108–98	Vince Carter (30)	Chris Bosh (16)	Jalen Rose (10)	Air Canada Centre; 17,779	12–8
21	December 9	@ Cleveland	W 100–93	Vince Carter (22)	Vince Carter (8)	Vince Carter (7)	Gund Arena; 16,939	13–8
22	December 12	@ Boston	L 111–114	Vince Carter (35)	Donyell Marshall (9)	Jalen Rose (14)	FleetCenter; 15,003	13–9
23	December 14	Miami	L 89–90	Donyell Marshall (25)	Chris Bosh (10)	Alvin Williams (9)	Air Canada Centre; 17,950	13–10
24	December 15	@ Dallas	L 94–111	Vince Carter (21)	Lonny Baxter (10)	Vince Carter (5)	American Airlines Center; 19,846	13–11
25	December 17	@ San Antonio	L 70–73	Donyell Marshall (19)	Donyell Marshall (14)	Alvin Williams (7)	SBC Center; 16,375	13–12
26	December 19	New York	W 105–99 (OT)	Jalen Rose (21)	Donyell Marshall (19)	Vince Carter (8)	Air Canada Centre; 19,233	14–12
27	December 21	Orlando	L 93–104	Donyell Marshall (19)	Donyell Marshall (19)	Alvin Williams (8)	Air Canada Centre; 19,800	14–13
28	December 26	@ Utah	L 94–97 (OT)	Vince Carter (30)	Chris Bosh, Vince Carter (7)	Jalen Rose (8)	Delta Center; 19,639	14–14
29	December 28	@ L.A. Clippers	W 94–88	Jalen Rose (23)	Donyell Marshall (9)	Vince Carter (5)	Staples Center; 14,311	15–14
30	December 30	@ Denver	W 81–74	Jalen Rose, Alvin Williams (17)	Donyell Marshall (13)	Alvin Williams (6)	Pepsi Center; 19,099	16–14

January: 5–9 (home: 4–4; road: 1–5)

Game	Date	Team	Score	High points	High rebounds	High assists	Location Attendance	Record
31	January 2	New Orleans	L 74–86	Vince Carter (22)	Donyell Marshall (8)	Vince Carter (4)	Air Canada Centre; 19,800	16–15
32	January 4	Phoenix	W 83–73	Vince Carter (23)	Donyell Marshall (15)	Alvin Williams (7)	Air Canada Centre; 19,029	17–15
33	January 7	Cleveland	W 75–69	Vince Carter, Donyell Marshall (14)	Donyell Marshall (13)	Vince Carter (5)	Air Canada Centre; 19,874	18–15
34	January 9	L.A. Clippers	L 68–78	Jalen Rose (26)	Vince Carter (10)	Alvin Williams (7)	Air Canada Centre; 18,405	18–16
35	January 11	Portland	W 83–72	Vince Carter (20)	Donyell Marshall (11)	Vince Carter (7)	Air Canada Centre; 18,906	19–16
36	January 14	@ Detroit	L 91–95	Vince Carter (27)	Donyell Marshall (16)	Jalen Rose (8)	The Palace of Auburn Hills; 18,473	19–17
37	January 15	@ New Orleans	W 78–74 (OT)	Jalen Rose (20)	Donyell Marshall (12)	Jalen Rose (6)	New Orleans Arena; 14,673	20–17
38	January 17	@ Atlanta	L 70–75	Donyell Marshall (16)	Donyell Marshall (12)	Jalen Rose, Alvin Williams (5)	Philips Arena; 13,928	20–18
39	January 19	@ New York	L 79–90	Jalen Rose (22)	Donyell Marshall (15)	Jalen Rose (5)	Madison Square Garden; 19,308	20–19
40	January 21	Minnesota	L 97–108	Donyell Marshall (22)	Chris Bosh, Donyell Marshall, Jalen Rose (5)	Milt Palacio, Alvin Williams (4)	Air Canada Centre; 18,846	20–20
41	January 23	@ Milwaukee	L 86–98	Donyell Marshall (17)	Chris Bosh (6)	Vince Carter (8)	Bradley Center; 15,813	20–21
42	January 25	@ Chicago	L 89–96	Chris Bosh (23)	Chris Bosh (10)	Vince Carter (8)	United Center; 22,039	20–22
43	January 28	Philadelphia	W 94–84	Donyell Marshall (19)	Donyell Marshall (10)	Jalen Rose (13)	Air Canada Centre; 17,708	21–22
44	January 30	Detroit	L 89–90 (OT)	Vince Carter (31)	Chris Bosh (13)	Alvin Williams (4)	Air Canada Centre; 19,555	21–23

February: 4–11 (home: 1–7; road: 3–4)

Game	Date	Team	Score	High points	High rebounds	High assists	Location Attendance	Record
45	February 1	L.A. Lakers	L 83–84	Vince Carter (27)	Chris Bosh (14)	Morris Peterson (4)	Air Canada Centre; 20,116	21–24
46	February 3	@ Philadelphia	W 93–80	Vince Carter (33)	Donyell Marshall (14)	Jalen Rose (5)	Wachovia Center; 19,049	22–24
47	February 4	Orlando	W 110–90	Donyell Marshall (32)	Jérôme Moïso (12)	Vince Carter (9)	Air Canada Centre; 16,228	23–24
48	February 6	Indiana	L 77–83	Donyell Marshall (24)	Jérôme Moïso (11)	Vince Carter (6)	Air Canada Centre; 19,311	23–25
49	February 8	@ Golden State	W 84–81 (OT)	Vince Carter (22)	Donyell Marshall (13)	Vince Carter (4)	The Arena in Oakland; 16,873	24–25
50	February 10	@ Phoenix	W 101–94	Vince Carter (29)	Donyell Marshall (11)	Vince Carter (6)	America West Arena; 14,138	25–25
51	February 12	@ Seattle	L 74–94	Alvin Williams (20)	Donyell Marshall (17)	Vince Carter (7)	KeyArena; 14,239	25–26
52	February 17	@ Chicago	L 73–75	Vince Carter (21)	Donyell Marshall (24)	Alvin Williams (6)	United Center; 17,822	25–27
53	February 18	San Antonio	L 82–86	Vince Carter (22)	Donyell Marshall (11)	Vince Carter (6)	Air Canada Centre; 17,119	25–28
54	February 20	New Jersey	L 72–91	Donyell Marshall (17)	Donyell Marshall (13)	Alvin Williams (6)	Air Canada Centre; 19,301	25–29
55	February 22	Sacramento	L 81–96	Chris Bosh (20)	Donyell Marshall (13)	Alvin Williams (9)	Air Canada Centre; 19,800	25–30
56	February 24	@ New Jersey	L 74–86	Roger Mason (18)	Jérôme Moïso, Morris Peterson (6)	Milt Palacio (5)	Continental Airlines Arena; 12,829	25–31
57	February 25	Washington	L 74–76	Donyell Marshall (20)	Chris Bosh (9)	Roger Mason (6)	Air Canada Centre; 17,291	25–32
58	February 27	@ Boston	L 75–88	Donyell Marshall (19)	Donyell Marshall (13)	Roger Mason, Milt Palacio (4)	FleetCenter; 16,681	25–33
59	February 29	Boston	L 82–91	Milt Palacio (19)	Donyell Marshall (10)	Milt Palacio (8)	Air Canada Centre; 19,256	25–34

March: 5–10 (home: 3–5; road: 2–5)

Game	Date	Team	Score	High points	High rebounds	High assists	Location Attendance	Record
60	March 2	@ Miami	W 89–86	Vince Carter (27)	Chris Bosh (9)	Vince Carter (8)	American Airlines Arena; 14,178	26–34
61	March 3	@ Washington	L 70–84	Donyell Marshall (22)	Donyell Marshall (10)	Milt Palacio (8)	MCI Center; 13,921	26–35
62	March 5	New York	L 103–109	Vince Carter (32)	Donyell Marshall (11)	Vince Carter (9)	Air Canada Centre; 19,287	26–36
63	March 7	New Orleans	W 84–76	Vince Carter (26)	Donyell Marshall (14)	Vince Carter (8)	Air Canada Centre; 17,031	27–36
64	March 9	@ Indiana	L 84–94 (OT)	Vince Carter (28)	Donyell Marshall (13)	Rod Strickland (16)	Conseco Fieldhouse; 15,123	27–37
65	March 10	Cleveland	L 92–106	Vince Carter (19)	Donyell Marshall (12)	Rod Strickland (6)	Air Canada Centre; 17,459	27–38
66	March 14	Atlanta	W 101–84	Vince Carter (32)	Chris Bosh (16)	Vince Carter, Jalen Rose (7)	Air Canada Centre; 17,628	28–38
67	March 17	Utah	W 85–81	Vince Carter (24)	Vince Carter (9)	Jalen Rose (6)	Air Canada Centre; 17,875	29–38
68	March 19	Chicago	L 91–96	Vince Carter (30)	Chris Bosh (14)	Jalen Rose (6)	Air Canada Centre; 19,348	29–39
69	March 21	@ New Orleans	W 121–120 (OT)	Vince Carter (42)	Donyell Marshall (7)	Vince Carter (12)	New Orleans Arena; 14,307	30–39
70	March 23	@ Memphis	L 86–95	Vince Carter (30)	Donyell Marshall (17)	Jalen Rose (5)	Pyramid Arena; 13,191	30–40
71	March 24	@ Houston	L 89–90 (OT)	Vince Carter (26)	Vince Carter (13)	Jalen Rose (7)	Toyota Center; 14,388	30–41
72	March 26	@ New York	L 101–108	Vince Carter (40)	Chris Bosh (9)	Jalen Rose (9)	Madison Square Garden; 19,763	30–42
73	March 28	Memphis	L 88–94	Jalen Rose (18)	Donyell Marshall (14)	Vince Carter (9)	Air Canada Centre; 19,088	30–43
74	March 31	Golden State	L 78–85	Vince Carter (22)	Donyell Marshall (16)	Jalen Rose (4)	Air Canada Centre; 17,116	30–44

April: 3–5 (home: 1–3; road: 2–2)

Game	Date	Team	Score	High points	High rebounds	High assists	Location Attendance	Record
75	April 2	@ Indiana	L 64–84	Jalen Rose (22)	Chris Bosh (7)	Rod Strickland (4)	Conseco Fieldhouse; 17,775	30–45
76	April 4	Milwaukee	L 83–90	Jalen Rose (21)	Donyell Marshall (16)	Jalen Rose (7)	Air Canada Centre; 17,276	30–46
77	April 6	@ Cleveland	W 87–86	Vince Carter (32)	Donyell Marshall (11)	Jalen Rose (6)	Gund Arena; 20,071	31–46
78	April 7	Indiana	L 90–94	Donyell Marshall (26)	Donyell Marshall (10)	Jalen Rose (8)	Air Canada Centre; 17,554	31–47
79	April 9	@ Detroit	L 66–74	Chris Bosh, Vince Carter (18)	Donyell Marshall (11)	Vince Carter (5)	The Palace of Auburn Hills; 22,076	31–48
80	April 11	Chicago	L 108–114 (OT)	Jalen Rose (32)	Donyell Marshall (16)	Jalen Rose (6)	Air Canada Centre; 17,362	31–49
81	April 13	Detroit	W 87–78	Donyell Marshall (27)	Donyell Marshall (16)	Morris Peterson, Jalen Rose (5)	Air Canada Centre; 18,273	32–49
82	April 14	@ Milwaukee	W 89–87	Vince Carter (23)	Donyell Marshall (13)	Jalen Rose (6)	Bradley Center; 16,065	33–49

2003–04 season schedule

== Player statistics ==
=== Ragular season ===
Player	POS	GP	GS	MP	REB	AST	STL	BLK	PTS	MPG	RPG	APG	SPG	BPG	PPG
Morris Peterson	SF	82	29	2,148	261	113	88	14	678	26.2	3.2	1.4	1.1	.2	8.3
Chris Bosh	C	75	63	2,510	557	78	59	106	861	33.5	7.4	1.0	.8	1.4	11.5
Vince Carter	SG	73	73	2,785	349	348	88	65	1,645	38.2	4.8	4.8	1.2	.9	22.5
Michael Curry	SF	70	15	1,229	87	53	23	5	204	17.6	1.2	.8	.3	.1	2.9
Donyell Marshall^{†}	PF	66	66	2,580	709	94	80	104	1,066	39.1	10.7	1.4	1.2	1.6	16.2
Milt Palacio	PG	59	13	1,211	102	184	41	11	257	20.5	1.7	3.1	.7	.2	4.4
Alvin Williams	SG	56	54	1,730	150	224	55	10	494	30.9	2.7	4.0	1.0	.2	8.8
Jalen Rose^{†}	PG	50	50	1,968	202	273	39	18	810	39.4	4.0	5.5	.8	.4	16.2
Lonny Baxter^{†}	C	36	4	487	121	10	14	18	150	13.5	3.4	.3	.4	.5	4.2
Jérôme Moïso	PF	35	1	417	113	8	17	12	102	11.9	3.2	.2	.5	.3	2.9
Lamond Murray	SF	33	4	518	90	28	15	7	197	15.7	2.7	.8	.5	.2	6.0
Robert Archibald^{†}	C	30	3	246	50	12	13	3	29	8.2	1.7	.4	.4	.1	1.0
Roger Mason Jr.^{†}	SG	23	3	285	28	23	10	6	93	12.4	1.2	1.0	.4	.3	4.0
Corie Blount^{†}	C	16	0	294	69	10	11	5	38	18.4	4.3	.6	.7	.3	2.4
Antonio Davis^{†}	C	15	15	538	143	14	8	8	129	35.9	9.5	.9	.5	.5	8.6
Jerome Williams^{†}	PF	15	12	407	128	11	19	3	77	27.1	8.5	.7	1.3	.2	5.1
Rod Strickland^{†}	PG	15	1	282	37	59	8	4	71	18.8	2.5	3.9	.5	.3	4.7
Dion Glover^{†}	SG	14	4	178	29	15	10	2	64	12.7	2.1	1.1	.7	.1	4.6
Mengke Bateer	C	7	0	40	8	1	1	0	8	5.7	1.1	.1	.1	.0	1.1
Jannero Pargo^{†}	PG	5	0	71	4	12	4	1	18	14.2	.8	2.4	.8	.2	3.6
Michael Bradley^{†}	PF	5	0	38	11	1	1	0	3	7.6	2.2	.2	.2	.0	.6
Rick Brunson^{†}	PG	3	0	10	0	2	0	0	4	3.3	.0	.7	.0	.0	1.3
Chris Jefferies^{†}	SG	2	0	8	1	1	0	0	8	4.0	.5	.5	.0	.0	4.0

- ^{†} Denotes player spent time with another team in the season. Stats reflect time with the Raptors only.

== Award winners ==
- Vince Carter, NBA All-Star Game Appearance, (Starter)
- Chris Bosh, NBA All-Star Rookie-Sophomore Game Appearance (Rookie)
- Chris Bosh, NBA All-Rookie First Team
