= 2004 NBA playoffs =

Basketball competition

Tournament details
- Dates: April 17–June 15, 2004
- Season: 2003–04
- Teams: 16

Final positions
- Champions: Detroit Pistons (3rd title)
- Runners-up: Los Angeles Lakers
- Semifinalists: Indiana Pacers; Minnesota Timberwolves

Tournament statistics
- Scoring leader(s): Kobe Bryant (Lakers) (24.5 PPG)

Awards
- MVP: Chauncey Billups (Pistons)

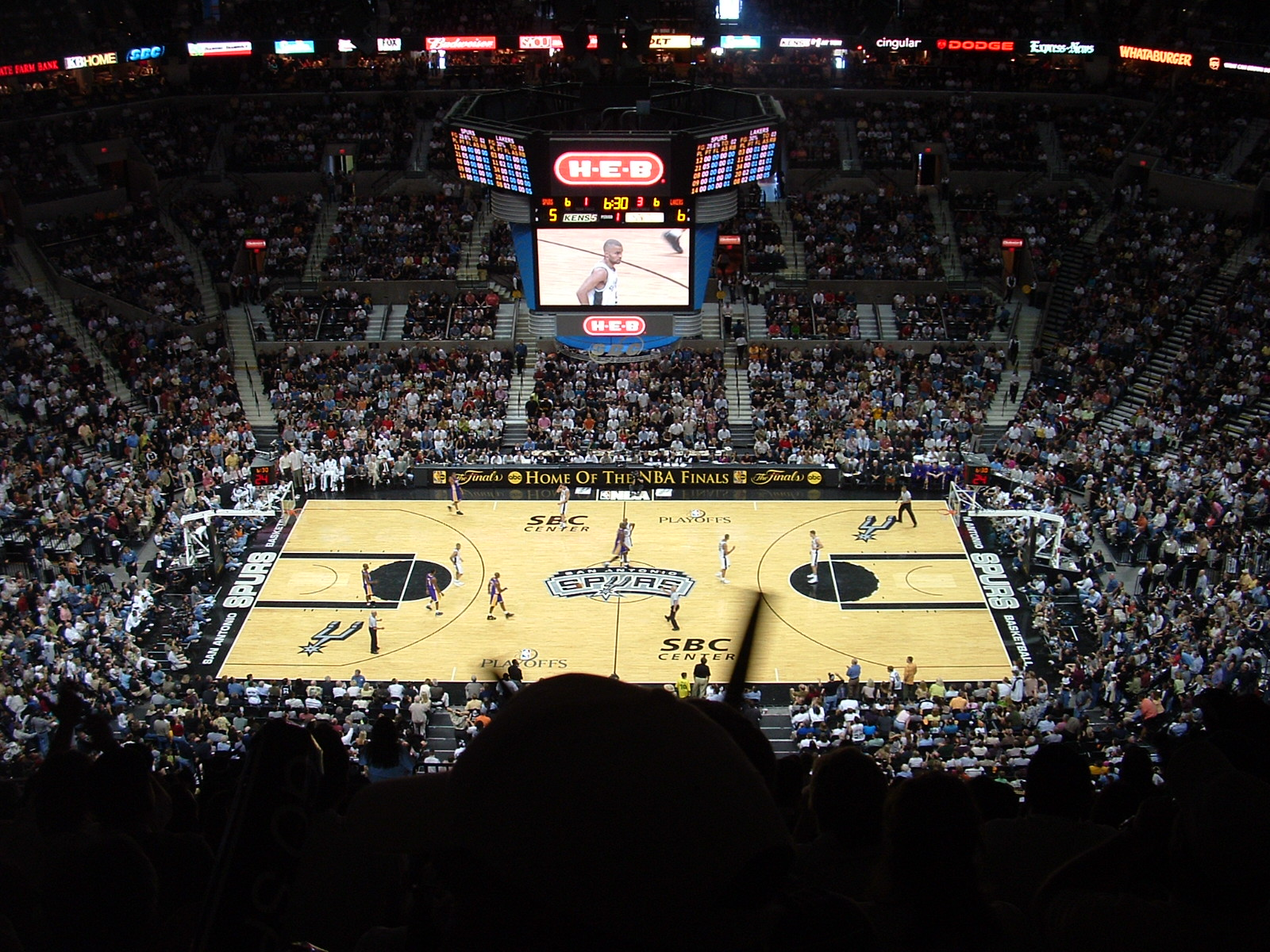
The San Antonio Spurs hosting the Los Angeles Lakers in Game 1 of the Western Conference Semifinals at the SBC Center

The 2004 NBA playoffs was the postseason tournament of the National Basketball Association's 2003–04 season. The tournament concluded with the Eastern Conference champion Detroit Pistons defeating the Western Conference champion Los Angeles Lakers four games to one in the NBA Finals. Chauncey Billups was named NBA Finals MVP.

== Overview ==
The 2004 playoffs was the first appearance for the Memphis Grizzlies in their nine-year history which began in Vancouver. However, they failed to win a single game in their first three playoff appearances (2004, 2005, 2006) before earning their first playoff game and series victories in 2011.

The Minnesota Timberwolves, entered their eighth consecutive post season.

The Denver Nuggets made the playoffs for the first time since 1995.

The New Orleans Hornets made their final postseason appearance as a member of the East. They would not make the playoffs again until 2008, as a member of the West (the result of a realignment with the addition of the Charlotte Bobcats in the 2004–05 NBA season). Their playoff series with the Miami Heat, led by Dwyane Wade, was the last playoff series where the home team won all seven games until 2008's Boston–Atlanta and Boston–Cleveland playoff series.

The Houston Rockets made playoffs for the first time since 1999. As a result, 2004 was the first time in 14 years that all Texas teams made the playoffs, and the second time (first in ten years) that all former ABA teams made the playoffs. This was Steve Francis' only career playoff appearance.

This was the first postseason since 1998 without Allen Iverson or Tracy McGrady.

The Miami Heat and the New York Knicks both made the playoffs for the first time since 2001. This marked Dwyane Wade's first postseason appearance and the start of four straight playoff appearances for the Heat. For the Knicks, on the other hand, this was their last appearance until 2011.

The Portland Trail Blazers and Utah Jazz missed the playoffs for the first time since 1982 and 1983, respectively.

Game 4 of the Spurs–Grizzlies series was the last NBA game ever played at Pyramid Arena. That game and Game 3 of the same series were the only playoff games to take place in The Pyramid before the Grizzlies moved to FedExForum in the autumn of 2004.

With their series win over the Denver Nuggets, the Minnesota Timberwolves won their first playoff series in franchise history.

With their first round series loss to the Sacramento Kings, the Dallas Mavericks lost a first round playoff series for the first time since 1990. As of 2024, this remains the Kings’ most recent series victory.

Game 5 of the Lakers–Spurs series was extremely notable for both teams’ last shots. Tim Duncan scored a two–pointer to give the Spurs a 73–72 lead with 0.4 seconds remaining. However, Derek Fisher would hit the game winning shot as time expired to give the Lakers a 74–73 victory in San Antonio.

With their conference semifinals victory over the Miami Heat, the Indiana Pacers made the Eastern Conference Finals for the first time since their NBA Finals run in 2000, after which they significantly changed the makeup of their team (yet still made the playoffs every year).

With their conference semifinals victory over the Sacramento Kings, the Minnesota Timberwolves made their first conference finals appearance in franchise history. They didn't return to the conference finals until 2024.

Game 2 of the Pistons–Pacers series was notable for Tayshaun Prince's block of Reggie Miller's late game layup.

Game 6 of the Timberwolves–Lakers series was the last Minnesota Timberwolves postseason game until 2018.

With their Conference Finals win over the Indiana Pacers, the Detroit Pistons made the NBA Finals for the first time since 1990.

In a shocking upset, the Detroit Pistons beat the Los Angeles Lakers in five games to win the NBA Championship.

== Playoff qualifying ==
=== Eastern Conference ===
==== Best record in NBA ====
The Indiana Pacers clinched the best record in the NBA and had earned home court advantage throughout the entire playoffs. However, when Indiana lost to the Detroit Pistons in the Eastern Conference Finals, home court advantage for the NBA Finals switched to the Western Conference champion Los Angeles Lakers, who had posted a better regular season record at 56–26 than the Eastern Conference champion Detroit Pistons at 54–28.

==== Clinched a playoff berth ====
The following teams clinched a playoff berth in the East:

1. Indiana Pacers (61–21) (clinched Central division)
2. New Jersey Nets (47–35) (clinched Atlantic division)
3. Detroit Pistons (54–28)
4. Miami Heat (42–40)
5. New Orleans Hornets (41–41, 3–1 head-to-head vs. MIL)
6. Milwaukee Bucks (41–41, 1–3 head-to-head vs. NOH)
7. New York Knicks (39–43)
8. Boston Celtics (36–46)

=== Western Conference ===
==== Best record in conference ====
The Minnesota Timberwolves clinched the best record in the Western Conference and had home court advantage throughout the Western Conference playoffs. However, when Minnesota lost to the Los Angeles Lakers in the Western Conference Finals, the Lakers gained home court advantage for the NBA Finals because the Lakers posted a better regular season record at 56-26 than the Eastern Conference champion Detroit Pistons at 54–28.

==== Clinched a playoff berth ====
The following teams clinched a playoff berth in the West:

1. Minnesota Timberwolves (58–24) (clinched Midwest division)
2. Los Angeles Lakers (56–26) (clinched Pacific division)
3. San Antonio Spurs (57–25)
4. Sacramento Kings (55–27)
5. Dallas Mavericks (52–30)
6. Memphis Grizzlies (50–32)
7. Houston Rockets (45–37)
8. Denver Nuggets (43–39)

== Bracket ==
Conference Quarterfinals	Conference Semifinals
E1	Indiana*	4
E8	Boston	0
E1	Indiana*	4
E4	Miami	2
E4	Miami	4
E5	New Orleans	3
Eastern Conference
E3	Detroit	4
E6	Milwaukee	1
E3	Detroit	4
E2	New Jersey*	3
E2	New Jersey*	4
E7	New York	0
W1	Minnesota*	4
W8	Denver	1
W1	Minnesota*	4
W4	Sacramento	3
W4	Sacramento	4
W5	Dallas	1
Western Conference
W3	San Antonio	4
W6	Memphis	0
W3	San Antonio	2
W2	LA Lakers*	4
W2	LA Lakers*	4
W7	Houston	1

Conference Finals
E1	Indiana*	2
E3	Detroit	4
W1	Minnesota*	2
W2	LA Lakers*	4

NBA Finals
E3	Detroit	4
W2	LA Lakers*	1

- * Division winner
- Bold Series winner
- Italic Team with home-court advantage

== First round ==
All times are in Eastern Daylight Time (UTC−4)

=== Eastern Conference first round ===
==== (1) Indiana Pacers vs. (8) Boston Celtics ====
ESPN

April 17
1:00 pm

Recap

Boston Celtics 88, Indiana Pacers 106
Scoring by quarter: 29–32, 14–35, 21–23, 24–16
Pts: Paul Pierce 20; Rebs: Paul Pierce 10; Asts: three players 4 each	Pts: O'Neal, Artest 24 each Rebs: Jermaine O'Neal 11; Asts: Jamaal Tinsley 7
Indiana leads series, 1–0

Conseco Fieldhouse, Indianapolis, Indiana
Attendance: 16,605
Referees: Scott Foster, David Jones, Bennett Salvatore

NBA TV

April 20
7:00 pm

Recap

Boston Celtics 90, Indiana Pacers 103
Scoring by quarter: 22–17, 24–24, 23–24, 21–38
Pts: Paul Pierce 27; Rebs: Mark Blount 10; Asts: Chucky Atkins 6	Pts: Jermaine O'Neal 22; Rebs: Al Harrington 13; Asts: Reggie Miller 7
Indiana leads series, 2–0

Conseco Fieldhouse, Indianapolis, Indiana
Attendance: 17,347
Referees: Joe Crawford, Bob Delaney, Michael Smith

ESPN

April 23
7:00 pm

Recap

Indiana Pacers 108, Boston Celtics 85
Scoring by quarter: 23–20, 30–20, 26–23, 29–22
Pts: Harrington, Bender 19 each Rebs: O'Neal, Foster 7 each Asts: Ron Artest 5	Pts: Ricky Davis 16; Rebs: Mark Blount 8 Asts: Ricky Davis 7
Indiana leads series, 3–0

FleetCenter, Boston, Massachusetts
Attendance: 17,680
Referees: Steve Javie, Monty McCutchen, Ron Olesiak

ESPN

April 25
12:30 pm

Recap

Indiana Pacers 90, Boston Celtics 75
Scoring by quarter: 21–25, 25–13, 24–14, 20–23
Pts: Ron Artest 22; Rebs: Foster, Harrington 7 each Asts: Jamaal Tinsley 7	Pts: Paul Pierce 27; Rebs: Mark Blount 13; Asts: Walter McCarty 5
Indiana wins series, 4–0

FleetCenter, Boston, Massachusetts
Attendance: 16,389
Referees: Joe Forte, Ron Garretson, Mark Wunderlich

Regular-season series
Indiana won 3–1 in the regular-season series

November 11, 2003

Recap

Boston Celtics 78, Indiana Pacers 76

Conseco Fieldhouse, Indianapolis, Indiana

January 2, 2004

Recap

Indiana Pacers 103, Boston Celtics 90

FleetCenter, Boston, Massachusetts

January 31, 2004

Recap

Boston Celtics 98, Indiana Pacers 99

Conseco Fieldhouse, Indianapolis, Indiana

March 12, 2004

Recap

Indiana Pacers 99, Boston Celtics 81

FleetCenter, Boston, Massachusetts

This was the fourth playoff meeting between these two teams, with the Celtics winning the first three meetings.

Previous playoff series
Boston leads 3–0 in all-time playoff series

1991

Boston Celtics 3, Indiana Pacers 2

1991 Eastern Conference First Round

1992

Boston Celtics 3, Indiana Pacers 0

1992 Eastern Conference First Round

2003

Boston Celtics 4, Indiana Pacers 2

2003 Eastern Conference First Round

==== (2) New Jersey Nets vs. (7) New York Knicks ====
ESPN

April 17
4:30 pm

Recap

New York Knicks 83, New Jersey Nets 107
Scoring by quarter: 24–30, 31–32, 13–24, 15–21
Pts: Penny Hardaway 18; Rebs: Stephon Marbury 5 Asts: Shandon Anderson 5	Pts: Richard Jefferson 21; Rebs: Kenyon Martin 12; Asts: Jason Kidd 13
New Jersey leads series, 1–0

Continental Airlines Arena, East Rutherford, New Jersey
Attendance: 18,206
Referees: James Capers, Jim Clark, Eddie F. Rush

TNT

April 20
8:00 pm

Recap

New York Knicks 81, New Jersey Nets 99
Scoring by quarter: 24–26, 15–26, 20–20, 22–27
Pts: Stephon Marbury 23; Rebs: Kurt Thomas 12; Asts: Penny Hardaway 10	Pts: Kenyon Martin 22; Rebs: Kenyon Martin 16; Asts: Jason Kidd 8
New Jersey leads series, 2–0

Continental Airlines Arena, East Rutherford, New Jersey
Attendance: 19,918
Referees: Sean Corbin, Jack Nies, Greg Willard

TNT

April 22
6:00 pm

Recap

New Jersey Nets 81, New York Knicks 78
Scoring by quarter: 25–15, 15–25, 25–15, 16–23
Pts: Martin, Kidd 19 each Rebs: Kenyon Martin 15; Asts: Richard Jefferson 10	Pts: three players 18 each Rebs: Kurt Thomas 12; Asts: Stephon Marbury 10
New Jersey leads series, 3–0

Madison Square Garden, New York City, New York
Attendance: 19,763
Referees: Joe Crawford, Scott Foster, Michael Smith

TNT

April 25
6:30 pm

Recap

New Jersey Nets 100, New York Knicks 94
Scoring by quarter: 21–21, 23–25, 25–22, 31–26
Pts: Kenyon Martin 36; Rebs: Kenyon Martin 13; Asts: Jason Kidd 7	Pts: Stephon Marbury 31; Rebs: Kurt Thomas 15; Asts: Stephon Marbury 7
New Jersey wins series, 4–0

Madison Square Garden, New York City, New York
Attendance: 19,763
Referees: Bernie Fryer, Ken Mauer, Blane Reichelt

Regular-season series
New Jersey won 3–1 in the regular-season series

November 14, 2003

Recap

New York Knicks 80, New Jersey Nets 85

Continental Airlines Arena, East Rutherford, New Jersey

January 4, 2004

Recap

New Jersey Nets 95, New York Knicks 85

Madison Square Garden, New York City, New York

March 19, 2004

Recap

New Jersey Nets 65, New York Knicks 79

Madison Square Garden, New York City, New York

April 2, 2004

Recap

New York Knicks 83, New Jersey Nets 108

Continental Airlines Arena, East Rutherford, New Jersey

This was the third playoff meeting between these two teams, with the Knicks winning the first two meetings.

Previous playoff series
New York leads 2–0 in all-time playoff series

1983

New Jersey Nets 0, New York Knicks 2

1983 Eastern Conference First Round

1994

New Jersey Nets 1, New York Knicks 3

1994 Eastern Conference First Round

==== (3) Detroit Pistons vs. (6) Milwaukee Bucks ====
ABC

April 18
3:30 pm

Recap

Milwaukee Bucks 82, Detroit Pistons 108
Scoring by quarter: 21–27, 22–25, 15–28, 24–28
Pts: Desmond Mason 16; Rebs: Joe Smith 11; Asts: Damon Jones 7	Pts: Richard Hamilton 21; Rebs: Ben Wallace 14; Asts: Richard Hamilton 8
Detroit leads series, 1–0

The Palace of Auburn Hills, Auburn Hills, Michigan
Attendance: 22,076
Referees: Sean Corbin, Dan Crawford, Ken Mauer

ESPN

April 21
6:00 pm

Recap

Milwaukee Bucks 92, Detroit Pistons 88
Scoring by quarter: 25–25, 23–16, 22–19, 22–28
Pts: Michael Redd 26; Rebs: Joe Smith 13; Asts: Damon Jones 7	Pts: Chauncey Billups 20; Rebs: Ben Wallace 12; Asts: Chauncey Billups 8
Series tied, 1–1

The Palace of Auburn Hills, Auburn Hills, Michigan
Attendance: 22,076
Referees: Tim Donaghy, Monty McCutchen, Bennett Salvatore

ESPN

April 24
7:00 pm

Recap

Detroit Pistons 95, Milwaukee Bucks 85
Scoring by quarter: 22–30, 20–19, 32–19, 21–17
Pts: Chauncey Billups 21; Rebs: Ben Wallace 21; Asts: Chauncey Billups 7	Pts: Mason, Redd 19 each Rebs: Desmond Mason 9 Asts: Damon Jones 7
Detroit leads series, 2–1

Bradley Center, Milwaukee, Wisconsin
Attendance: 18,717
Referees: Joe DeRosa, Jack Nies, Derrick Stafford

TNT

April 26
7:00 pm

Recap

Detroit Pistons 109, Milwaukee Bucks 92
Scoring by quarter: 28–27, 24–22, 22–19, 35–24
Pts: Richard Hamilton 27; Rebs: B. Wallace, R. Wallace 9 each Asts: Chauncey Billups 9	Pts: Smith, Jones 17 each Rebs: Joe Smith 12; Asts: Damon Jones 10
Detroit leads series, 3–1

Bradley Center, Milwaukee, Wisconsin
Attendance: 17,316
Referees: Dick Bavetta, Tony Brothers, Jim Clark

TNT

April 29
8:00 pm

Recap

Milwaukee Bucks 77, Detroit Pistons 91
Scoring by quarter: 22–24, 10–15, 22–30, 23–22
Pts: Michael Redd 22; Rebs: Keith Van Horn 12; Asts: Damon Jones 6	Pts: Tayshaun Prince 24; Rebs: Ben Wallace 12; Asts: Tayshaun Prince 8
Detroit wins series, 4–1

The Palace of Auburn Hills, Auburn Hills, Michigan
Attendance: 22,076
Referees: Bob Delaney, Bernie Fryer, Bill Spooner

Regular-season series
Detroit won 3–1 in the regular-season series

November 7, 2003

Recap

Milwaukee Bucks 99, Detroit Pistons 105

The Palace of Auburn Hills, Auburn Hills, Michigan

December 23, 2003

Recap

Detroit Pistons 78, Milwaukee Bucks 83

Bradley Center, Milwaukee, Wisconsin

January 17, 2004

Recap

Detroit Pistons 99, Milwaukee Bucks 94

Bradley Center, Milwaukee, Wisconsin

February 18, 2004

Recap

Milwaukee Bucks 98, Detroit Pistons 102

The Palace of Auburn Hills, Auburn Hills, Michigan

This was the third playoff meeting between these two teams, with the Pistons winning the first two meetings.

Previous playoff series
Detroit leads 2–0 in all-time playoff series

1976

Detroit Pistons 2, Milwaukee Bucks 1

1976 Western Conference First Round

1989

Detroit Pistons 4, Milwaukee Bucks 0

1989 Eastern Conference Semifinals

==== (4) Miami Heat vs. (5) New Orleans Hornets ====
TNT

April 18
12:30 pm

Recap

New Orleans Hornets 79, Miami Heat 81
Scoring by quarter: 22–23, 22–18, 15–25, 20–15
Pts: Baron Davis 17; Rebs: Brown, Magloire 11 each Asts: Augmon, Davis 4 each	Pts: Dwyane Wade 21; Rebs: Lamar Odom 11; Asts: Odom, Wade 5 each
Miami leads series, 1–0

American Airlines Arena, Miami, Florida
Attendance: 20,102
Referees: Dick Bavetta, Tim Donaghy, Joe Forte

TNT

April 21
8:00 pm

Recap

New Orleans Hornets 63, Miami Heat 93
Scoring by quarter: 17–28, 17–15, 10–23, 19–27
Pts: Baron Davis 13; Rebs: Jamaal Magloire 10; Asts: Baron Davis 7	Pts: Eddie Jones 19; Rebs: Brian Grant 11; Asts: Dwyane Wade 6
Miami leads series, 2–0

American Airlines Arena, Miami, Florida
Attendance: 20,189
Referees: Dan Crawford, Derrick Stafford, Tom Washington

ESPN2

April 24
8:00 pm

Recap

Miami Heat 71, New Orleans Hornets 77
Scoring by quarter: 14–19, 15–22, 21–16, 21–20
Pts: Caron Butler 24; Rebs: Caron Butler 15; Asts: Caron Butler 4	Pts: Baron Davis 21; Rebs: Brown, Lynch 11 each Asts: Baron Davis 5
Miami leads series, 2–1

New Orleans Arena, New Orleans, Louisiana
Attendance: 14,251
Referees: Tony Brothers, Scott Foster, Bennett Salvatore

TNT

April 27
8:00 pm

Recap

Miami Heat 85, New Orleans Hornets 96
Scoring by quarter: 17–22, 27–28, 27–18, 14–28
Pts: Lamar Odom 25; Rebs: Brian Grant 9 Asts: Dwyane Wade 10	Pts: Baron Davis 23; Rebs: Brown, West 7 each Asts: Baron Davis 10
Series tied, 2–2

New Orleans Arena, New Orleans, Louisiana
Attendance: 16,009
Referees: Bernie Fryer, Luis Grillo, Bill Spooner

ESPN

April 30
7:00 pm

Recap

New Orleans Hornets 83, Miami Heat 87
Scoring by quarter: 24–14, 22–28, 17–16, 20–29
Pts: Baron Davis 33; Rebs: P. J. Brown 13; Asts: Baron Davis 7	Pts: Eddie Jones 25; Rebs: Caron Butler 11; Asts: Dwyane Wade 5
Miami leads series, 3–2

American Airlines Arena, Miami, Florida
Attendance: 20,147
Referees: Joe DeRosa, Ken Mauer, Jack Nies

ABC

May 2
3:30 pm

Recap

Miami Heat 83, New Orleans Hornets 89
Scoring by quarter: 14–21, 19–22, 22–26, 28–20
Pts: Dwyane Wade 27; Rebs: Lamar Odom 11; Asts: Dwyane Wade 6	Pts: Brown, Lynch 16 each Rebs: Brown, Magloire 9 each Asts: Baron Davis 12
Series tied, 3–3

New Orleans Arena, New Orleans, Louisiana
Attendance: 17,297
Referees: Sean Corbin, Joe Crawford, Blane Reichelt

ABC

May 4
7:00 pm

Recap

New Orleans Hornets 77, Miami Heat 85
Scoring by quarter: 18–25, 13–16, 22–22, 24–22
Pts: Steve Smith 25; Rebs: Jamaal Magloire 10; Asts: Davis, Williams 4 each	Pts: Caron Butler 23; Rebs: three players 9 each Asts: Dwyane Wade 7
Miami wins series, 4–3

American Airlines Arena, Miami, Florida
Attendance: 20,286
Referees: Ron Garretson, Steve Javie, Bennett Salvatore

Regular-season series
Miami won 3–1 in the regular-season series

November 25, 2003

Recap

New Orleans Hornets 87, Miami Heat 91

American Airlines Arena, Miami, Florida

January 31, 2004

Recap

Miami Heat 94, New Orleans Hornets 70

New Orleans Arena, New Orleans, Louisiana

March 10, 2004

Recap

Miami Heat 84, New Orleans Hornets 95

New Orleans Arena, New Orleans, Louisiana

March 16, 2004

Recap

New Orleans Hornets 83, Miami Heat 96

American Airlines Arena, Miami, Florida

- In Game 1, Dwyane Wade hits the game winner with 1.3 seconds left.

This was the first playoff meeting between the Heat and the New Orleans Pelicans/Hornets franchise.

=== Western Conference first round ===
==== (1) Minnesota Timberwolves vs. (8) Denver Nuggets ====
TNT

April 18
9:30 pm

Recap

Denver Nuggets 92, Minnesota Timberwolves 106
Scoring by quarter: 22–31, 20–20, 26–28, 24–27
Pts: Anthony, Camby 19 each Rebs: Marcus Camby 8 Asts: Earl Boykins 5	Pts: Sam Cassell 40; Rebs: Kevin Garnett 20; Asts: Garnett, Sprewell 4 each
Minnesota leads series, 1–0

Target Center, Minneapolis, Minnesota
Attendance: 18,503
Referees: Tony Brothers, Mike Callahan, Jack Nies

ABC

April 21
8:30 pm

Recap

Denver Nuggets 81, Minnesota Timberwolves 95
Scoring by quarter: 27–28, 9–22, 18–16, 27–29
Pts: Voshon Lenard 24; Rebs: Carmelo Anthony 9 Asts: Anthony, Nenê 3 each	Pts: Latrell Sprewell 31; Rebs: Kevin Garnett 22; Asts: Kevin Garnett 10
Minnesota leads series, 2–0

Target Center, Minneapolis, Minnesota
Attendance: 18,101
Referees: Dick Bavetta, Luis Grillo, Mark Wunderlich

ESPN2

April 24
10:30 pm

Recap

Minnesota Timberwolves 86, Denver Nuggets 107
Scoring by quarter: 18–30, 23–24, 25–31, 20–22
Pts: Latrell Sprewell 25; Rebs: Kevin Garnett 11; Asts: Kevin Garnett 8	Pts: Carmelo Anthony 24; Rebs: Marcus Camby 16; Asts: Andre Miller 6
Minnesota leads series, 2–1

Pepsi Center, Denver, Colorado
Attendance: 19,713
Referees: Dan Crawford, Bill Kennedy, Tom Washington

TNT

April 27
10:30 pm

Recap

Minnesota Timberwolves 84, Denver Nuggets 82
Scoring by quarter: 20–20, 16–16, 30–27, 18–19
Pts: Kevin Garnett 27; Rebs: Kevin Garnett 14; Asts: Kevin Garnett 5	Pts: Voshon Lenard 28; Rebs: Marcus Camby 14; Asts: Marcus Camby 5
Minnesota leads series, 3–1

Pepsi Center, Denver, Colorado
Attendance: 19,694
Referees: Ron Garretson, Ron Olesiak, Bennett Salvatore

ESPN

April 30
9:30 pm

Recap

Denver Nuggets 91, Minnesota Timberwolves 102
Scoring by quarter: 19–28, 26–29, 21–17, 25–28
Pts: Camby, Miller 21 each Rebs: Marcus Camby 15; Asts: Boykins, Lenard 4 each	Pts: Kevin Garnett 28; Rebs: Garnett, Madsen 7 each Asts: Kevin Garnett 8
Minnesota wins series, 4–1

Target Center, Minneapolis, Minnesota
Attendance: 19,890
Referees: Joe Forte, Steve Javie, Derrick Stafford

Regular-season series
Minnesota won 3–1 in the regular-season series

November 18, 2003

Recap

Denver Nuggets 76, Minnesota Timberwolves 89

Target Center, Minneapolis, Minnesota

January 26, 2004

Recap

Minnesota Timberwolves 97, Denver Nuggets 95

Pepsi Center, Denver, Colorado

March 21, 2004

Recap

Denver Nuggets 77, Minnesota Timberwolves 98

Target Center, Minneapolis, Minnesota

March 24, 2004

Recap

Minnesota Timberwolves 92, Denver Nuggets 101

Pepsi Center, Denver, Colorado

This was the first playoff meeting between the Nuggets and the Timberwolves.

==== (2) Los Angeles Lakers vs. (7) Houston Rockets ====
ESPN

April 17
10:30 pm

Recap

Houston Rockets 71, Los Angeles Lakers 72
Scoring by quarter: 18–20, 16–20, 17–9, 20–23
Pts: Steve Francis 18; Rebs: Jim Jackson 12; Asts: Steve Francis 5	Pts: Shaquille O'Neal 20; Rebs: Shaquille O'Neal 17; Asts: Kobe Bryant 6
LA Lakers lead series, 1–0

Staples Center, Los Angeles, California
Attendance: 18,997
Referees: Ron Garretson, Steve Javie, Blane Reichelt

TNT

April 19
10:30 pm

Recap

Houston Rockets 84, Los Angeles Lakers 98
Scoring by quarter: 22–23, 24–21, 18–30, 20–24
Pts: Yao Ming 21; Rebs: Steve Francis 10; Asts: Steve Francis 12	Pts: Kobe Bryant 36; Rebs: Karl Malone 8 Asts: Gary Payton 7
LA Lakers lead series, 2–0

Staples Center, Los Angeles, California
Attendance: 18,997
Referees: Bennie Adams, Joe DeRosa, Bernie Fryer

ESPN

April 23
9:30 pm

Recap

Los Angeles Lakers 91, Houston Rockets 102
Scoring by quarter: 23–29, 20–27, 19–18, 29–28
Pts: Shaquille O'Neal 25; Rebs: Malone, O'Neal 11 each Asts: Gary Payton 7	Pts: Steve Francis 27; Rebs: Jackson, Yao 10 each Asts: Steve Francis 7
LA Lakers lead series, 2–1

Toyota Center, Houston, Texas
Attendance: 18,226
Referees: Mike Callahan, James Capers, Eddie F. Rush

ABC

April 25
3:30 pm

Recap

Los Angeles Lakers 92, Houston Rockets 88 (OT)
Scoring by quarter: 21–24, 24–17, 24–18, 12–22, Overtime: 11–7
Pts: Karl Malone 30; Rebs: Karl Malone 13; Asts: Gary Payton 7	Pts: Steve Francis 17; Rebs: Jim Jackson 20; Asts: Steve Francis 9
LA Lakers lead series, 3–1

Toyota Center, Houston, Texas
Attendance: 18,219
Referees: Joe Crawford, David Jones, Bill Spooner

TNT

April 28
10:00 pm

Recap

Houston Rockets 78, Los Angeles Lakers 97
Scoring by quarter: 27–24, 21–23, 9–25, 21–25
Pts: Jim Jackson 17; Rebs: Kelvin Cato 12; Asts: Steve Francis 5	Pts: Kobe Bryant 31; Rebs: Malone, O'Neal 9 each Asts: Kobe Bryant 10
LA Lakers win series, 4–1

Staples Center, Los Angeles, California
Attendance: 18,997
Referees: Dan Crawford, Monty McCutchen, Tom Washington

Regular-season series
Tied 2–2 in the regular-season series

December 25, 2003

Recap

Houston Rockets 99, Los Angeles Lakers 87

Staples Center, Los Angeles, California

February 11, 2004

Recap

Los Angeles Lakers 87, Houston Rockets 102

Toyota Center, Houston, Texas

March 3, 2004

Recap

Los Angeles Lakers 96, Houston Rockets 93

Toyota Center, Houston, Texas

April 1, 2004

Recap

Houston Rockets 85, Los Angeles Lakers 93

Staples Center, Los Angeles, California

This was the seventh playoff meeting between these two teams, with each team winning three series apiece.

Previous playoff series
Tied 3–3 in all-time playoff series

1981

Houston Rockets 2, Los Angeles Lakers 1

1981 Western Conference First Round

1986

Houston Rockets 4, Los Angeles Lakers 1

1986 Western Conference Finals

1990

Houston Rockets 1, Los Angeles Lakers 3

1990 Western Conference First Round

1991

Houston Rockets 0, Los Angeles Lakers 3

1991 Western Conference First Round

1996

Houston Rockets 3, Los Angeles Lakers 1

1996 Western Conference First Round

1999

Houston Rockets 1, Los Angeles Lakers 3

1999 Western Conference First Round

==== (3) San Antonio Spurs vs. (6) Memphis Grizzlies ====
ESPN

April 17
8:00 pm

Recap

Memphis Grizzlies 74, San Antonio Spurs 98
Scoring by quarter: 19–28, 15–21, 18–22, 22–27
Pts: Bonzi Wells 16; Rebs: Stromile Swift 7 Asts: Jason Williams 3	Pts: Tim Duncan 26; Rebs: Tim Duncan 9 Asts: Tony Parker 8
San Antonio leads series, 1–0

SBC Center, San Antonio, Texas
Attendance: 18,797
Referees: Bennie Adams, Joe DeRosa, Bernie Fryer

TNT

April 19
8:00 pm

Recap

Memphis Grizzlies 70, San Antonio Spurs 87
Scoring by quarter: 21–26, 14–20, 24–22, 11–19
Pts: Pau Gasol 20; Rebs: Pau Gasol 11; Asts: Jason Williams 4	Pts: Tony Parker 27; Rebs: Tim Duncan 12; Asts: Tony Parker 7
San Antonio leads series, 2–0

SBC Center, San Antonio, Texas
Attendance: 18,797
Referees: Luis Grillo, Eddie F. Rush, Mark Wunderlich

ABC

April 22
8:30 pm

Recap

San Antonio Spurs 95, Memphis Grizzlies 93
Scoring by quarter: 29–28, 21–29, 24–17, 21–19
Pts: Tim Duncan 22; Rebs: Tim Duncan 13; Asts: Tony Parker 6	Pts: Pau Gasol 18; Rebs: Swift, Wright 6 each Asts: Gasol, Williams 3 each
San Antonio leads series, 3–0

The Pyramid, Memphis, Tennessee
Attendance: 19,351
Referees: Sean Corbin, Jack Nies, Greg Willard

TNT

April 25
9:30 pm

Recap

San Antonio Spurs 110, Memphis Grizzlies 97
Scoring by quarter: 32–21, 25–24, 30–27, 23–25
Pts: Tony Parker 29; Rebs: Duncan, Horry 6 each Asts: Tony Parker 13	Pts: Pau Gasol 22; Rebs: James Posey 11; Asts: Jason Williams 8
San Antonio wins series, 4–0

The Pyramid, Memphis, Tennessee
Attendance: 19,351
Referees: Bob Delaney, Steve Javie, Jess Kersey

Regular-season series
Memphis won 3–1 in the regular-season series

November 3, 2003

Recap

San Antonio Spurs 80, Memphis Grizzlies 88

The Pyramid, Memphis, Tennessee

December 15, 2003

Recap

Memphis Grizzlies 67, San Antonio Spurs 78

SBC Center, San Antonio, Texas

March 1, 2004

Recap

Memphis Grizzlies 81, San Antonio Spurs 80

SBC Center, San Antonio, Texas

March 9, 2004

Recap

San Antonio Spurs 88, Memphis Grizzlies 94

The Pyramid, Memphis, Tennessee

This was the first playoff meeting between the Grizzlies and the Spurs.

==== (4) Sacramento Kings vs. (5) Dallas Mavericks ====
ABC

April 18
3:30 pm

Recap

Dallas Mavericks 105, Sacramento Kings 116
Scoring by quarter: 31–34, 34–29, 20–23, 20–30
Pts: Dirk Nowitzki 32; Rebs: Dirk Nowitzki 13; Asts: Steve Nash 8	Pts: Peja Stojaković 28; Rebs: Chris Webber 12; Asts: Doug Christie 11
Sacramento leads series, 1–0

ARCO Arena, Sacramento, California
Attendance: 17,317
Referees: Joe Crawford, Jess Kersey, Bill Spooner

TNT

April 20
10:30 pm

Recap

Dallas Mavericks 79, Sacramento Kings 83
Scoring by quarter: 19–21, 23–23, 18–17, 19–22
Pts: Dirk Nowitzki 28; Rebs: Marquis Daniels 11; Asts: Steve Nash 9	Pts: Mike Bibby 24; Rebs: Chris Webber 13; Asts: Chris Webber 12
Sacramento leads series, 2–0

ARCO Arena, Sacramento, California
Attendance: 17,317
Referees: Ron Garretson, Steve Javie, Blane Reichelt

ESPN

April 24
9:30 pm

Recap

Sacramento Kings 79, Dallas Mavericks 104
Scoring by quarter: 25–33, 17–16, 17–34, 20–21
Pts: Bibby, Webber 22 each Rebs: Peja Stojaković 8 Asts: Doug Christie 4	Pts: Marquis Daniels 22; Rebs: Josh Howard 14; Asts: Steve Nash 5
Sacramento leads series, 2–1

American Airlines Center, Dallas, Texas
Attendance: 20,580
Referees: Dick Bavetta, Jim Clark, Tim Donaghy

TNT

April 26
9:30 pm

Recap

Sacramento Kings 94, Dallas Mavericks 92
Scoring by quarter: 21–18, 18–26, 31–21, 24–27
Pts: Mike Bibby 22; Rebs: Brad Miller 16; Asts: three players 5 each	Pts: Dirk Nowitzki 21; Rebs: Dirk Nowitzki 14; Asts: Steve Nash 9
Sacramento leads series, 3–1

American Airlines Center, Dallas, Texas
Attendance: 20,677
Referees: Joe Crawford, Bill Kennedy, Tom Washington

TNT

April 29
10:30 pm

Recap

Dallas Mavericks 118, Sacramento Kings 119
Scoring by quarter: 37–24, 29–39, 30–33, 22–23
Pts: Dirk Nowitzki 31; Rebs: Dirk Nowitzki 14; Asts: Steve Nash 14	Pts: Mike Bibby 36; Rebs: Peja Stojaković 10; Asts: Bibby, Christie 8 each
Sacramento wins series, 4–1

ARCO Arena, Sacramento, California
Attendance: 17,317
Referees: Mike Callahan, Bennett Salvatore, Greg Willard

Regular-season series
Dallas won 3–1 in the regular-season series

December 25, 2003

Recap

Dallas Mavericks 111, Sacramento Kings 103

ARCO Arena, Sacramento, California

January 25, 2004

Recap

Sacramento Kings 99, Dallas Mavericks 108

American Airlines Center, Dallas, Texas

March 11, 2004

Recap

Dallas Mavericks 102, Sacramento Kings 120

ARCO Arena, Sacramento, California

April 1, 2004

Recap

Sacramento Kings 117, Dallas Mavericks 127

American Airlines Center, Dallas, Texas

This was the third playoff meeting between these two teams, with each team winning one series apiece.

Previous playoff series
Tied 1–1 in all-time playoff series

2002

Dallas Mavericks 1, Sacramento Kings 4

2002 Western Conference Semifinals

2003

Dallas Mavericks 4, Sacramento Kings 3

2003 Western Conference Semifinals

- As of the 2025-26 season, this remains the last playoff series the Kings won.

== Conference semifinals ==
=== Eastern Conference semifinals ===
==== (1) Indiana Pacers vs. (4) Miami Heat ====
TNT

May 6
9:00 pm

Recap

Miami Heat 81, Indiana Pacers 94
Scoring by quarter: 15–23, 21–23, 21–23, 24–25
Pts: Dwyane Wade 22; Rebs: Caron Butler 9 Asts: Alston, Wade 4 each	Pts: Ron Artest 25; Rebs: Jeff Foster 10; Asts: Jamaal Tinsley 5
Indiana leads series, 1–0

Conseco Fieldhouse, Indianapolis, Indiana
Attendance: 18,345
Referees: Dick Bavetta, James Capers, Tom Washington

ESPN

May 8
7:00 pm

Recap

Miami Heat 80, Indiana Pacers 91
Scoring by quarter: 19–21, 17–23, 18–25, 26–22
Pts: Odom, Wade 19 each Rebs: Lamar Odom 12; Asts: Alston, Wade 5 each	Pts: Ron Artest 20; Rebs: Harrington, O'Neal 9 each Asts: Jamaal Tinsley 9
Indiana leads series, 2–0

Conseco Fieldhouse, Indianapolis, Indiana
Attendance: 18,345
Referees: Joe Forte, Bernie Fryer, Bill Spooner

TNT

May 10
8:00 pm

Recap

Indiana Pacers 87, Miami Heat 94
Scoring by quarter: 20–14, 15–25, 25–25, 27–30
Pts: Jermaine O'Neal 29; Rebs: Jermaine O'Neal 9 Asts: Jamaal Tinsley 5	Pts: Dwyane Wade 25; Rebs: Brian Grant 16; Asts: Dwyane Wade 6
Indiana leads series, 2–1

American Airlines Arena, Miami, Florida
Attendance: 20,115
Referees: Dan Crawford, Tim Donaghy, Derrick Stafford

ESPN

May 12
8:00 pm

Recap

Indiana Pacers 88, Miami Heat 100
Scoring by quarter: 33–26, 23–27, 13–23, 19–24
Pts: Jermaine O'Neal 37; Rebs: Artest, Tinsley 8 each Asts: Jamaal Tinsley 5	Pts: Lamar Odom 22; Rebs: Caron Butler 10; Asts: Dwyane Wade 7
Series tied, 2–2

American Airlines Arena, Miami, Florida
Attendance: 20,128
Referees: Joe DeRosa, Luis Grillo, Eddie F. Rush

TNT

May 15
7:00 pm

Recap

Miami Heat 83, Indiana Pacers 94
Scoring by quarter: 21–19, 18–25, 16–29, 28–21
Pts: Dwyane Wade 16; Rebs: Lamar Odom 10; Asts: Dwyane Wade 10	Pts: Jermaine O'Neal 22; Rebs: Jeff Foster 16; Asts: Jamaal Tinsley 8
Indiana leads series, 3–2

Conseco Fieldhouse, Indianapolis, Indiana
Attendance: 18,345
Referees: Jim Clark, Bob Delaney, Bennett Salvatore

ESPN

May 18
8:00 pm

Recap

Indiana Pacers 73, Miami Heat 70
Scoring by quarter: 16–20, 20–13, 23–19, 14–18
Pts: Ron Artest 27; Rebs: Jermaine O'Neal 13; Asts: Jamaal Tinsley 3	Pts: Dwyane Wade 24; Rebs: Brian Grant 10; Asts: three players 2 each
Indiana wins series, 4–2

American Airlines Arena, Miami, Florida
Attendance: 20,136
Referees: Ron Garretson, Steve Javie, Jack Nies

Recap

Regular-season series
Indiana won 3–0 in the regular-season series

January 5, 2004

Recap

Indiana Pacers 87, Miami Heat 65

American Airlines Arena, Miami, Florida

February 8, 2004

Recap

Miami Heat 91, Indiana Pacers 97

Conseco Fieldhouse, Indianapolis, Indiana

March 28, 2004

Recap

Miami Heat 80, Indiana Pacers 87

Conseco Fieldhouse, Indianapolis, Indiana

This was the first playoff meeting between the Pacers and the Heat.

==== (3) Detroit Pistons vs. (2) New Jersey Nets ====
ABC

May 3
7:00 pm

Recap

New Jersey Nets 56, Detroit Pistons 78
Scoring by quarter: 14–18, 11–19, 14–20, 17–21
Pts: Kerry Kittles 15; Rebs: Jason Kidd 7 Asts: Jason Kidd 6	Pts: Hamilton, Prince 15 each Rebs: Ben Wallace 11; Asts: Richard Hamilton 7
Detroit leads series, 1–0

The Palace of Auburn Hills, Auburn Hills, Michigan
Attendance: 22,076
Referees: Mike Callahan, Luis Grillo, Eddie F. Rush

TNT

May 7
8:00 pm

Recap

New Jersey Nets 80, Detroit Pistons 95
Scoring by quarter: 19–18, 27–16, 11–27, 23–34
Pts: Jefferson, Martin 19 each Rebs: Jason Collins 10; Asts: Jason Kidd 11	Pts: Billups, Hamilton 28 each Rebs: Ben Wallace 11; Asts: Chauncey Billups 13
Detroit leads series, 2–0

The Palace of Auburn Hills, Auburn Hills, Michigan
Attendance: 22,076
Referees: Dan Crawford, Joe DeRosa, David Jones

ABC

May 9
3:00 pm

Recap

Detroit Pistons 64, New Jersey Nets 82
Scoring by quarter: 13–31, 25–16, 14–19, 12–16
Pts: Hamilton, B. Wallace 15 each Rebs: Ben Wallace 24; Asts: Ben Wallace 4	Pts: Richard Jefferson 30; Rebs: Kenyon Martin 9 Asts: Jason Kidd 12
Detroit leads series, 2–1

Continental Airlines Arena, East Rutherford, New Jersey
Attendance: 19,000
Referees: Ron Garretson, Ken Mauer, Bennett Salvatore

TNT

May 11
8:00 pm

Recap

Detroit Pistons 79, New Jersey Nets 94
Scoring by quarter: 18–21, 22–26, 16–30, 23–17
Pts: Richard Hamilton 30; Rebs: Ben Wallace 15; Asts: Chauncey Billups 5	Pts: Jason Kidd 22; Rebs: Kenyon Martin 15; Asts: Jason Kidd 11
Series tied, 2–2

Continental Airlines Arena, East Rutherford, New Jersey
Attendance: 19,860
Referees: Bob Delaney, Scott Foster, Steve Javie

TNT

May 14
7:00 pm

Recap

New Jersey Nets 127, Detroit Pistons 120 (3OT)
Scoring by quarter: 25–19, 18–25, 20–18, 25–26, Overtime: 11–11, 12–12, 16–9
Pts: Richard Jefferson 31; Rebs: Jefferson, Kittles 11 each Asts: Jason Kidd 8	Pts: Chauncey Billups 31; Rebs: Ben Wallace 11; Asts: Richard Hamilton 11
New Jersey leads series, 3–2

The Palace of Auburn Hills, Auburn Hills, Michigan
Attendance: 22,076
Referees: Dick Bavetta, Sean Corbin, Greg Willard

TNT

May 16
6:00 pm

Recap

Detroit Pistons 81, New Jersey Nets 75
Scoring by quarter: 23–25, 27–11, 10–21, 21–18
Pts: Richard Hamilton 24; Rebs: Ben Wallace 20; Asts: Richard Hamilton 4	Pts: Richard Jefferson 23; Rebs: Jefferson, Martin 7 each Asts: Jason Kidd 8
Series tied, 3–3

Continental Airlines Arena, East Rutherford, New Jersey
Attendance: 19,968
Referees: Bob Delaney, Scott Foster, Steve Javie

ESPN

May 20
8:00 pm

Recap

New Jersey Nets 69, Detroit Pistons 90
Scoring by quarter: 14–21, 17–22, 19–30, 19–17
Pts: Kerry Kittles 18; Rebs: Kenyon Martin 12; Asts: Jason Kidd 7	Pts: Chauncey Billups 22; Rebs: Ben Wallace 8 Asts: Chauncey Billups 7
Detroit wins series, 4–3

The Palace of Auburn Hills, Auburn Hills, Michigan
Attendance: 22,076
Referees: Dan Crawford, Ron Garretson, Eddie F. Rush

- In Game 5, Chauncey Billups hits a half court buzzer beater to send the game to overtime. 12 years later, Kyle Lowry of the Toronto Raptors would do the same in Game 1 against the Miami Heat in their second round matchup.

Regular-season series
Tied 2–2 in the regular-season series

November 9, 2003

Recap

New Jersey Nets 84, Detroit Pistons 98

The Palace of Auburn Hills, Auburn Hills, Michigan

December 26, 2003

Recap

New Jersey Nets 82, Detroit Pistons 79

The Palace of Auburn Hills, Auburn Hills, Michigan

February 10, 2004

Recap

Detroit Pistons 78, New Jersey Nets 89

Continental Airlines Arena, East Rutherford, New Jersey

March 18, 2004

Recap

Detroit Pistons 89, New Jersey Nets 71

Continental Airlines Arena, East Rutherford, New Jersey

This was the third playoff meeting between these two teams, with each team winning one series apiece.

Previous playoff series
Tied 1–1 in all-time playoff series

1985

Detroit Pistons 3, New Jersey Nets 0

1985 Eastern Conference First Round

2003

Detroit Pistons 0, New Jersey Nets 4

2003 Eastern Conference Finals

=== Western Conference semifinals ===
==== (1) Minnesota Timberwolves vs. (4) Sacramento Kings ====
TNT

May 4
9:30 pm

Recap

Sacramento Kings 104, Minnesota Timberwolves 98
Scoring by quarter: 34–27, 14–20, 25–26, 31–25
Pts: Mike Bibby 33; Rebs: Brad Miller 10; Asts: Mike Bibby 7	Pts: Sam Cassell 40; Rebs: Kevin Garnett 18; Asts: Kevin Garnett 7
Sacramento leads series, 1–0

Target Center, Minneapolis, Minnesota
Attendance: 18,792
Referees: Dan Crawford, Bob Delaney, Monty McCutchen

ESPN

May 8
9:30 pm

Recap

Sacramento Kings 89, Minnesota Timberwolves 94
Scoring by quarter: 12–17, 27–32, 31–24, 19–21
Pts: Peja Stojaković 26; Rebs: Brad Miller 11; Asts: Mike Bibby 8	Pts: Kevin Garnett 28; Rebs: Garnett, Johnson 11 each Asts: Sam Cassell 7
Series tied, 1–1

Target Center, Minneapolis, Minnesota
Attendance: 19,599
Referees: Mike Callahan, Sean Corbin, Eddie F. Rush

TNT

May 10
10:30 pm

Recap

Minnesota Timberwolves 114, Sacramento Kings 113 (OT)
Scoring by quarter: 22–18, 24–28, 33–23, 25–35, Overtime: 10–9
Pts: Kevin Garnett 30; Rebs: Kevin Garnett 15; Asts: Latrell Sprewell 6	Pts: Peja Stojaković 29; Rebs: Doug Christie 12; Asts: Mike Bibby 10
Minnesota leads series, 2–1

ARCO Arena, Sacramento, California
Attendance: 17,317
Referees: Dick Bavetta, Tony Brothers, Jim Clark

TNT

May 12
10:30 pm

Recap

Minnesota Timberwolves 81, Sacramento Kings 87
Scoring by quarter: 15–21, 16–21, 26–17, 24–28
Pts: Kevin Garnett 19; Rebs: Kevin Garnett 21; Asts: Cassell, Garnett 6 each	Pts: Chris Webber 28; Rebs: Chris Webber 8 Asts: Mike Bibby 12
Series tied, 2–2

ARCO Arena, Sacramento, California
Attendance: 17,317
Referees: James Capers, Bernie Fryer, Jack Nies

TNT

May 14
9:30 pm

Recap

Sacramento Kings 74, Minnesota Timberwolves 86
Scoring by quarter: 18–18, 16–20, 23–26, 17–22
Pts: Mike Bibby 14; Rebs: Brad Miller 10; Asts: Mike Bibby 6	Pts: Latrell Sprewell 34; Rebs: Mark Madsen 13; Asts: Sam Cassell 7
Minnesota leads series, 3–2

Target Center, Minneapolis, Minnesota
Attendance: 19,318
Referees: Steve Javie, Blane Reichelt, Derrick Stafford

ABC

May 16
3:30 pm

Recap

Minnesota Timberwolves 87, Sacramento Kings 104
Scoring by quarter: 30–24, 14–33, 19–21, 24–26
Pts: Latrell Sprewell 27; Rebs: Kevin Garnett 10; Asts: Kevin Garnett 5	Pts: Peja Stojaković 22; Rebs: Peja Stojaković 8 Asts: Mike Bibby 10
Series tied, 3–3

ARCO Arena, Sacramento, California
Attendance: 17,317
Referees: Dan Crawford, Joe DeRosa, Bill Spooner

TNT

May 19
8:30 pm

Recap

Sacramento Kings 80, Minnesota Timberwolves 83
Scoring by quarter: 16–22, 15–19, 29–21, 20–21
Pts: Doug Christie 21; Rebs: three players 8 each Asts: Mike Bibby 8	Pts: Kevin Garnett 32; Rebs: Kevin Garnett 21; Asts: Sam Cassell 7
Minnesota wins series, 4–3

Target Center, Minneapolis, Minnesota
Attendance: 19,944
Referees: Dick Bavetta, Bennett Salvatore, Tom Washington

Regular-season series
Minnesota won 3–1 in the regular-season series

November 5, 2003

Recap

Sacramento Kings 125, Minnesota Timberwolves 121 (OT)

Target Center, Minneapolis, Minnesota

December 5, 2003

Recap

Minnesota Timberwolves 112, Sacramento Kings 109 (OT)

ARCO Arena, Sacramento, California

February 19, 2004

Recap

Sacramento Kings 75, Minnesota Timberwolves 92

Target Center, Minneapolis, Minnesota

April 8, 2004

Recap

Minnesota Timberwolves 94, Sacramento Kings 86

ARCO Arena, Sacramento, California

This was the first playoff meeting between the Timberwolves and the Kings.

- This would be the last playoff series the Timberwolves won until the 2023-24 season.

==== (3) San Antonio Spurs vs. (2) Los Angeles Lakers ====
ABC

May 2
2:30 pm

Recap

Los Angeles Lakers 78, San Antonio Spurs 88
Scoring by quarter: 14–21, 19–20, 32–21, 13–26
Pts: Kobe Bryant 31; Rebs: Shaquille O'Neal 13; Asts: Karl Malone 5	Pts: Tim Duncan 30; Rebs: Tim Duncan 11; Asts: Tony Parker 9
San Antonio leads series, 1–0

SBC Center, San Antonio, Texas
Attendance: 18,797
Referees: Dick Bavetta, Tony Brothers, Jim Clark

TNT

May 5
9:00 pm

Recap

Los Angeles Lakers 85, San Antonio Spurs 95
Scoring by quarter: 17–33, 28–28, 23–12, 17–22
Pts: Shaquille O'Neal 32; Rebs: Shaquille O'Neal 15; Asts: Kobe Bryant 8	Pts: Tony Parker 30; Rebs: Bowen, Duncan 7 each Asts: Manu Ginóbili 6
San Antonio leads series, 2–0

SBC Center, San Antonio, Texas
Attendance: 18,797
Referees: Scott Foster, Bernie Fryer, Greg Willard

ABC

May 9
12:30 pm

Recap

San Antonio Spurs 81, Los Angeles Lakers 105
Scoring by quarter: 16–28, 16–14, 26–33, 23–30
Pts: Manu Ginóbili 17; Rebs: Tim Duncan 13; Asts: Tony Parker 5	Pts: Shaquille O'Neal 28; Rebs: Shaquille O'Neal 15; Asts: Gary Payton 7
San Antonio leads series, 2–1

Staples Center, Los Angeles, California
Attendance: 18,997
Referees: Steve Javie, Jack Nies, Blane Reichelt

TNT

May 11
10:30 pm

Recap

San Antonio Spurs 90, Los Angeles Lakers 98
Scoring by quarter: 27–21, 26–22, 16–31, 21–24
Pts: Manu Ginóbili 21; Rebs: Tim Duncan 10; Asts: Duncan, Parker 8 each	Pts: Kobe Bryant 42; Rebs: Shaquille O'Neal 14; Asts: Karl Malone 6
Series tied, 2–2

Staples Center, Los Angeles, California
Attendance: 18,997
Referees: Monty McCutchen, Bennett Salvatore, Tom Washington

ESPN

May 13
7:00 pm

Recap

Los Angeles Lakers 74, San Antonio Spurs 73
Scoring by quarter: 24–18, 18–17, 20–18, 12–20
Pts: Kobe Bryant 22; Rebs: Karl Malone 12; Asts: Gary Payton 7	Pts: Tim Duncan 21; Rebs: Tim Duncan 21; Asts: Tony Parker 6
LA Lakers lead series, 3–2

SBC Center, San Antonio, Texas
Attendance: 18,797
Referees: Dan Crawford, Joe Forte, Ron Garretson

TNT

May 15
7:30 pm

Recap

San Antonio Spurs 76, Los Angeles Lakers 88
Scoring by quarter: 21–23, 18–16, 13–17, 24–32
Pts: Tim Duncan 20; Rebs: Tim Duncan 11; Asts: Manu Ginóbili 4	Pts: Kobe Bryant 26; Rebs: Shaquille O'Neal 19; Asts: Bryant, Payton 7 each
LA Lakers win series, 4–2

Staples Center, Los Angeles, California
Attendance: 18,997
Referees: Mike Callahan, Ken Mauer, Eddie F. Rush

In the final seconds of Game 5, Tim Duncan hits a fadeaway shot over Shaquille O'Neal to give the Spurs the lead, but with 0.4 seconds left, Derek Fisher off the inbounds pass hits a miracle buzzer beater to give the Lakers the victory.

Regular-season series
Los Angeles won 3–1 in the regular-season series

November 6, 2003

Recap

Los Angeles Lakers 120, San Antonio Spurs 117 (2OT)

SBC Center, San Antonio, Texas

November 28, 2003

Recap

San Antonio Spurs 87, Los Angeles Lakers 103

Staples Center, Los Angeles, California

December 3, 2003

Recap

Los Angeles Lakers 90, San Antonio Spurs 86

SBC Center, San Antonio, Texas

April 4, 2004

Recap

San Antonio Spurs 95, Los Angeles Lakers 89

Staples Center, Los Angeles, California

This was the tenth playoff meeting between these two teams, with the Lakers winning six of the first nine meetings.

Previous playoff series
Los Angeles leads 6–3 in all-time playoff series

1982

Los Angeles Lakers 4, San Antonio Spurs 0

1982 Western Conference Finals

1983

Los Angeles Lakers 4, San Antonio Spurs 2

1983 Western Conference Finals

1986

Los Angeles Lakers 3, San Antonio Spurs 0

1986 Western Conference First Round

1988

Los Angeles Lakers 3, San Antonio Spurs 0

1988 Western Conference First Round

1995

Los Angeles Lakers 2, San Antonio Spurs 4

1995 Western Conference Semifinals

1999

Los Angeles Lakers 0, San Antonio Spurs 4

1999 Western Conference Semifinals

2001

Los Angeles Lakers 4, San Antonio Spurs 0

2001 Western Conference Finals

2002

Los Angeles Lakers 4, San Antonio Spurs 1

2002 Western Conference Semifinals

2003

Los Angeles Lakers 2, San Antonio Spurs 4

2003 Western Conference Semifinals

== Conference finals ==
=== Eastern Conference finals ===
==== (1) Indiana Pacers vs. (3) Detroit Pistons ====
ESPN

May 22
7:00 pm

Recap

Detroit Pistons 74, Indiana Pacers 78
Scoring by quarter: 26–22, 15–26, 17–13, 16–17
Pts: Richard Hamilton 23; Rebs: Ben Wallace 22; Asts: Ben Wallace 5	Pts: Jermaine O'Neal 21; Rebs: Jermaine O'Neal 14; Asts: Jamaal Tinsley 5
Indiana leads series, 1–0

Conseco Fieldhouse, Indianapolis, Indiana
Attendance: 18,345
Referees: Mike Callahan, Bernie Fryer, Ken Mauer

ESPN

May 24
7:00 pm

Recap

Detroit Pistons 72, Indiana Pacers 67
Scoring by quarter: 12–17, 25–26, 18–11, 17–13
Pts: Richard Hamilton 23; Rebs: three players 8 each Asts: Chauncey Billups 6	Pts: Reggie Miller 21; Rebs: Jeff Foster 9 Asts: Anthony Johnson 4
Series tied, 1–1

Conseco Fieldhouse, Indianapolis, Indiana
Attendance: 18,345
Referees: Jim Clark, Bennett Salvatore, Tom Washington

ESPN

May 26
8:30 pm

Recap

Indiana Pacers 78, Detroit Pistons 85
Scoring by quarter: 14–27, 16–9, 15–20, 33–29
Pts: Jermaine O'Neal 24; Rebs: Jermaine O'Neal 9 Asts: Jamaal Tinsley 4	Pts: Hamilton, R. Wallace 20 each Rebs: Ben Wallace 16; Asts: Chauncey Billups 8
Detroit leads series, 2–1

The Palace of Auburn Hills, Auburn Hills, Michigan
Attendance: 22,076
Referees: Dick Bavetta, Eddie Rush, Bill Spooner

ESPN

May 28
8:00 pm

Recap

Indiana Pacers 83, Detroit Pistons 68
Scoring by quarter: 29–17, 20–22, 21–11, 13–18
Pts: Ron Artest 20; Rebs: Jermaine O'Neal 13; Asts: Jamaal Tinsley 5	Pts: Richard Hamilton 22; Rebs: Ben Wallace 19; Asts: Chauncey Billups 5
Series tied, 2–2

The Palace of Auburn Hills, Auburn Hills, Michigan
Attendance: 22,076
Referees: Joe Crawford, Bob Delaney, Greg Willard

ESPN

May 30
7:00 pm

Recap

Detroit Pistons 83, Indiana Pacers 65
Scoring by quarter: 25–17, 16–19, 21–17, 21–12
Pts: Richard Hamilton 33; Rebs: Ben Wallace 12; Asts: Chauncey Billups 7	Pts: Artest, Jones 13 each Rebs: Ron Artest 11; Asts: Jamaal Tinsley 5
Detroit leads series, 3–2

Conseco Fieldhouse, Indianapolis, Indiana
Attendance: 18,345
Referees: Joe DeRosa, Ron Garretson, Steve Javie

ESPN

June 1
8:00 pm

Recap

Indiana Pacers 65, Detroit Pistons 69
Scoring by quarter: 23–11, 10–16, 17–19, 15–23
Pts: Jermaine O'Neal 20; Rebs: Artest, O'Neal 10 each Asts: Anthony Johnson 7	Pts: Richard Hamilton 21; Rebs: Ben Wallace 16; Asts: Richard Hamilton 5
Detroit wins series, 4–2

The Palace of Auburn Hills, Auburn Hills, Michigan
Attendance: 22,076
Referees: Mike Callahan, Dan Crawford, Jack Nies

Regular-season series
Indiana won 3–1 in the regular-season series

October 29, 2003

Recap

Indiana Pacers 89, Detroit Pistons 87

The Palace of Auburn Hills, Auburn Hills, Michigan

December 19, 2003

Recap

Detroit Pistons 75, Indiana Pacers 80

Conseco Fieldhouse, Indianapolis, Indiana

January 20, 2004

Recap

Detroit Pistons 69, Indiana Pacers 81

Conseco Fieldhouse, Indianapolis, Indiana

April 4, 2004

Recap

Indiana Pacers 61, Detroit Pistons 79

The Palace of Auburn Hills, Auburn Hills, Michigan

This was the second playoff meeting between these two teams, with the Pistons winning the first meeting.

Previous playoff series
Detroit leads 1–0 in all-time playoff series

1990

Detroit Pistons 3, Indiana Pacers 0

1990 Eastern Conference First Round

=== Western Conference finals ===
==== (1) Minnesota Timberwolves vs. (2) Los Angeles Lakers ====
TNT

May 21
8:00 pm

Recap

Los Angeles Lakers 97, Minnesota Timberwolves 88
Scoring by quarter: 23–24, 23–20, 32–23, 19–21
Pts: Shaquille O'Neal 27; Rebs: Shaquille O'Neal 18; Asts: Bryant, Fisher 6 each	Pts: Latrell Sprewell 23; Rebs: Kevin Garnett 10; Asts: Sam Cassell 8
LA Lakers lead series, 1–0

Target Center, Minneapolis, Minnesota
Attendance: 19,552
Referees: Joe Crawford, Bob Delaney, Greg Willard

TNT

May 23
7:30 pm

Recap

Los Angeles Lakers 71, Minnesota Timberwolves 89
Scoring by quarter: 24–32, 13–19, 19–17, 15–21
Pts: Kobe Bryant 27; Rebs: Shaquille O'Neal 16; Asts: Kobe Bryant 6	Pts: Kevin Garnett 24; Rebs: Kevin Garnett 11; Asts: Latrell Sprewell 8
Series tied, 1–1

Target Center, Minneapolis, Minnesota
Attendance: 19,707
Referees: Joe DeRosa, Steve Javie, Bill Spooner

TNT

May 25
6:00 pm

Recap

Minnesota Timberwolves 89, Los Angeles Lakers 100
Scoring by quarter: 17–24, 18–20, 30–26, 24–30
Pts: Kevin Garnett 22; Rebs: Kevin Garnett 11; Asts: Kevin Garnett 7	Pts: Bryant, O'Neal 22 each Rebs: Shaquille O'Neal 17; Asts: Gary Payton 9
LA Lakers lead series, 2–1

Staples Center, Los Angeles, California
Attendance: 18,997
Referees: Dan Crawford, Ron Garretson, Derrick Stafford

TNT

May 27
6:00 pm

Recap

Minnesota Timberwolves 85, Los Angeles Lakers 92
Scoring by quarter: 24–23, 16–22, 20–30, 25–17
Pts: Kevin Garnett 28; Rebs: Kevin Garnett 13; Asts: Kevin Garnett 9	Pts: Kobe Bryant 31; Rebs: Shaquille O'Neal 19; Asts: Kobe Bryant 8
LA Lakers lead series, 3–1

Staples Center, Los Angeles, California
Attendance: 18,997
Referees: Mike Callahan, Bernie Fryer, Jack Nies

TNT

May 29
8:00 pm

Recap

Los Angeles Lakers 96, Minnesota Timberwolves 98
Scoring by quarter: 21–14, 19–32, 23–27, 33–25
Pts: Kobe Bryant 23; Rebs: Shaquille O'Neal 13; Asts: Kobe Bryant 7	Pts: Kevin Garnett 30; Rebs: Kevin Garnett 19; Asts: Latrell Sprewell 5
LA Lakers lead series, 3–2

Target Center, Minneapolis, Minnesota
Attendance: 20,109
Referees: Jim Clark, Bennett Salvatore, Tom Washington

TNT

May 31
6:00 pm

Recap

Minnesota Timberwolves 90, Los Angeles Lakers 96
Scoring by quarter: 17–28, 29–20, 22–19, 22–29
Pts: Latrell Sprewell 27; Rebs: Kevin Garnett 17; Asts: Sprewell, Martin 5 each	Pts: Shaquille O'Neal 25; Rebs: Shaquille O'Neal 11; Asts: Gary Payton 8
LA Lakers win series, 4–2

Staples Center, Los Angeles, California
Attendance: 18,997
Referees: Dick Bavetta, Ken Mauer, Eddie Rush

Regular-season series
Minnesota won 3–1 in the regular-season series

January 6, 2004

Recap

Los Angeles Lakers 90, Minnesota Timberwolves 106

Target Center, Minneapolis, Minnesota

January 30, 2004

Recap

Minnesota Timberwolves 97, Los Angeles Lakers 84

Staples Center, Los Angeles, California

March 12, 2004

Recap

Los Angeles Lakers 86, Minnesota Timberwolves 96

Target Center, Minneapolis, Minnesota

March 26, 2004

Recap

Minnesota Timberwolves 73, Los Angeles Lakers 90

Staples Center, Los Angeles, California

This was the second playoff meeting between these two teams, with the Lakers winning the first meeting.

Previous playoff series
Los Angeles leads 1–0 in all-time playoff series

2003

Los Angeles Lakers 4, Minnesota Timberwolves 2

2003 Western Conference First Round

- This was the Timberwolves only Conference Finals appearance until the 2023-24 season. In addition, this was the Lakers 4th Conference Finals victory since the 1999-00 season.

== NBA Finals: (W2) Los Angeles Lakers vs. (E3) Detroit Pistons ==
ABC

June 6
9:00 pm

Recap

Detroit Pistons 87, Los Angeles Lakers 75
Scoring by quarter: 22–19, 18–22, 24–17, 23–17
Pts: Chauncey Billups 22; Rebs: B. Wallace, R. Wallace 8 each Asts: Richard Hamilton 5	Pts: Shaquille O'Neal 34; Rebs: O'Neal, Malone 11 each Asts: Kobe Bryant 4
Detroit leads series, 1–0

Staples Center, Los Angeles, California
Attendance: 18,997
Referees: Joe Crawford, Bob Delaney, Bernie Fryer

ABC

June 8
9:00 pm

Recap

Detroit Pistons 91, Los Angeles Lakers 99 (OT)
Scoring by quarter: 16–18, 20–26, 30–24, 23–21, Overtime: 2–10
Pts: Chauncey Billups 27; Rebs: Ben Wallace 14; Asts: Chauncey Billups 9	Pts: Kobe Bryant 33; Rebs: Karl Malone 9 Asts: Luke Walton 8
Series tied, 1–1

Staples Center, Los Angeles, California
Attendance: 18,997
Referees: Joe DeRosa, Steve Javie, Bennett Salvatore

ABC

June 10
9:00 pm

Recap

Los Angeles Lakers 68, Detroit Pistons 88
Scoring by quarter: 16–24, 16–15, 19–24, 17–25
Pts: Shaquille O'Neal 14; Rebs: O'Neal, Medvedenko 8 each Asts: Gary Payton 7	Pts: Richard Hamilton 31; Rebs: Ben Wallace 11; Asts: three players 3 each
Detroit leads series, 2–1

The Palace of Auburn Hills, Auburn Hills, Michigan
Attendance: 22,076
Referees: Mike Callahan, Dan Crawford, Ron Garretson

ABC

June 13
9:00 pm

Recap

Los Angeles Lakers 80, Detroit Pistons 88
Scoring by quarter: 22–21, 17–20, 17–15, 24–32
Pts: Shaquille O'Neal 36; Rebs: Shaquille O'Neal 17; Asts: Rick Fox 6	Pts: Rasheed Wallace 26; Rebs: R. Wallace, B. Wallace 13 each Asts: Richard Hamilton 6
Detroit leads series, 3–1

The Palace of Auburn Hills, Auburn Hills, Michigan
Attendance: 22,076
Referees: Dick Bavetta, Jack Nies, Eddie Rush

ABC

June 15
9:00 pm

Recap

Los Angeles Lakers 87, Detroit Pistons 100
Scoring by quarter: 24–25, 21–30, 14–27, 28–18
Pts: Kobe Bryant 24; Rebs: Shaquille O'Neal 8 Asts: Luke Walton 5	Pts: Richard Hamilton 21; Rebs: Ben Wallace 22; Asts: Chauncey Billups 6
Detroit wins series, 4–1

The Palace of Auburn Hills, Auburn Hills, Michigan
Attendance: 22,076
Referees: Joe Crawford, Bernie Fryer, Bennett Salvatore

- In Game 2, Kobe Bryant hits the game-tying 3 with 2.1 seconds left to force overtime.
- Game 4 is Karl Malone's final NBA game.

Regular-season series
Tied 1–1 in the regular-season series

November 14, 2003

Recap

Detroit Pistons 89, Los Angeles Lakers 94

Staples Center, Los Angeles, California

November 18, 2003

Recap

Los Angeles Lakers 96, Detroit Pistons 106

The Palace of Auburn Hills, Auburn Hills, Michigan

This was the 12th playoff meeting between these two teams, with the Lakers winning nine of the first 11 meetings.

Previous playoff series
Los Angeles leads 9–2 in all-time playoff series

1950

Fort Wayne Pistons 0, Minneapolis Lakers 2

1950 Central Division Finals

1953

Fort Wayne Pistons 2, Minneapolis Lakers 3

1953 Western Division Finals

1954

Fort Wayne Pistons 0, Minneapolis Lakers 2

1954 Western Division Round Robin Semifinals

1955

Fort Wayne Pistons 3, Minneapolis Lakers 1

1955 Western Division Finals

1957

Fort Wayne Pistons 0, Minneapolis Lakers 2

1957 Western Division Semifinals

1959

Detroit Pistons 1, Minneapolis Lakers 2

1959 Western Division Semifinals

1960

Detroit Pistons 0, Minneapolis Lakers 2

1960 Western Division Semifinals

1961

Detroit Pistons 2, Los Angeles Lakers 3

1961 Western Division Semifinals

1962

Detroit Pistons 2, Los Angeles Lakers 4

1962 Western Division Finals

1988

Detroit Pistons 3, Los Angeles Lakers 4

1988 NBA Finals

1989

Detroit Pistons 4, Los Angeles Lakers 0

1989 NBA Finals

== Statistical leaders ==
Category	Game high			Average			
Category	Player	Team	High	Player	Team	Avg.	GP
Points	Kobe Bryant	Los Angeles Lakers	42	Dirk Nowitzki	Dallas Mavericks	26.6	5
Rebounds	Ben Wallace	Detroit Pistons	24	Kevin Garnett	Minnesota Timberwolves	14.6	18
Assists	Steve Nash	Dallas Mavericks	14	Jason Kidd	New Jersey Nets	9.0	11
Steals	Chauncey Billups; Latrell Sprewell; Mike Bibby; Trenton Hassell; Reggie Miller; Doug Christie; Caron Butler; Al Harrington; Kobe Bryant	Detroit Pistons; Minnesota Timberwolves; Sacramento Kings; Minnesota Timberwolves; Indiana Pacers; Sacramento Kings; Miami Heat; Indiana Pacers; Los Angeles Lakers	5	Brevin Knight	Milwaukee Bucks	2.8	5
Blocks	Shaquille O'Neal	Los Angeles Lakers	8	Shaquille O'Neal	Los Angeles Lakers	2.8	22
