= 2002–03 New Orleans Hornets season =

- Head coach: Paul Silas
- General manager: Bob Bass
- Owner(s): George Shinn, Ray Wooldridge
- Arena: New Orleans Arena

Results
- Record: 47–35 (.573)
- Place: Division: 3rd (Central); Conference: 5th (Eastern)
- Playoff finish: First round (lost to 76ers 2–4)
- Stats at Basketball Reference

Local media
- Television: Cox Sports Television
- Radio: WTIX

The 2002–03 New Orleans Hornets season was the inaugural season for the New Orleans Hornets in the National Basketball Association. (Note: At the time, this season was considered the 15th season in franchise history, being viewed as a relocation from Charlotte. In 2014, after this team was rebranded as the Pelicans, the name and the statistical history of the original team was reclaimed by the present-day Charlotte Hornets, who had begun play in 2004 as an expansion team known as the Charlotte Bobcats.) After fourteen seasons in Charlotte, North Carolina, the Hornets relocated to New Orleans, Louisiana and became the "New Orleans Hornets"; it was the first NBA franchise for the city since the New Orleans Jazz, who relocated to Salt Lake City, Utah in 1979. Originally reckoned as the 15th season of the franchise, the second incarnation of the Charlotte Hornets' reclaiming the heritage of the original Hornets has since retroactively deemed this season as the inaugural season for the franchise that would eventually become the Pelicans.

== Season summary ==
=== Off-season ===
For the season, the Hornets moved into a new arena known as the New Orleans Arena. During the off-season, the team acquired Courtney Alexander from the Washington Wizards.

For the season, the Hornets slightly updated their original primary logo of a teal hornet with blue eyes, and blue stripes bouncing a basketball, and adding yellow to their color scheme of teal, blue and white. The team replaced the city name "Charlotte" with "New Orleans" above their logo and on the hornet's chest, and changed the wordmark of the team name "Hornets" underneath; the city name above the logo, and the team name are both featured in teal letters with blue outlines. The color of the basketball was changed from orange to yellow, and the letter "H" on the hornet's chest was changed from blue to yellow.

The team also redesigned their home and road uniforms, which featured the city name "New Orleans" on the front of their jerseys, inline and outline side panels on their jerseys and shorts, and their primary logo on both legs of their shorts. The white home uniforms featured a teal, yellow and blue trim and a teal outline, a yellow inline and a blue outline as side panels; the teal road uniforms featured a blue and yellow trim, and a thin white outline, a blue outline and a yellow inline as side panels.

The team's new primary logo, and new uniforms would both remain in use until 2008.

=== Regular season ===
The Hornets made their NBA regular season debut in New Orleans on October 30, 2002, in which the team defeated the Utah Jazz at home, 100–75 in front of an attendance of 17,668 fans at the New Orleans Arena. The Hornets outscored the Jazz 32–11 in the fourth quarter, as Baron Davis finished the game with a double-double of 21 points and 10 assists, and made 4 out of 6 three-point field-goal attempts.

With the addition of Alexander, the Hornets got off to a fast start by winning 10 of their first 13 games of the regular season. However, after a 17–7 start to the season, the team struggled and lost 13 of their next 16 games, and held a 26–24 record at the All-Star break. In January, the Hornets signed free agent Robert Pack. At mid-season, the team traded Elden Campbell to the Seattle SuperSonics in exchange for Kenny Anderson, who had previously played for the Hornets back in Charlotte during the second half of the 1995–96 season. The Hornets posted an eight-game winning streak between February and March, and won their final five games of the season, finishing in third place in the Central Division with a decent 47–35 record, and earning the fifth seed in the Eastern Conference.

Jamal Mashburn averaged 21.6 points, 6.1 rebounds and 5.6 assists per game, contributed 119 three-point field goals, and was named to the All-NBA Third Team, while Davis averaged 17.1 points, 6.4 assists and 1.8 steals per game, but only played just 50 games due to a left knee injury, and David Wesley provided the team with 16.7 points and 1.5 steals per game, and also led them with 134 three-point field goals. In addition, P.J. Brown contributed 10.7 points and 9.0 rebounds per game, while Jamaal Magloire became the team's starting center, averaging 10.3 points, 8.8 rebounds and 1.4 blocks per game. Off the bench, Alexander contributed 7.9 points per game, while Anderson provided with 6.0 points and 3.3 assists per game in 23 games after the trade, Pack contributed 5.2 points and 2.9 assists per game, George Lynch averaged 4.5 points and 4.4 rebounds per game, and Robert Traylor provided with 3.9 points and 3.8 rebounds per game.

During the NBA All-Star weekend at the Philips Arena in Atlanta, Georgia, Mashburn was selected for the 2003 NBA All-Star Game, as a member of the Eastern Conference All-Star team; it was his first and only All-Star appearance. Meanwhile, Wesley participated in the NBA Three-Point Shootout. Mashburn also finished tied in eleventh place in Most Valuable Player voting, while head coach Paul Silas finished in twelfth place in Coach of the Year voting.

The Hornets finished 19th in the NBA in home-game attendance, with an attendance of 641,683 at the New Orleans Arena during the regular season.

=== NBA playoffs ===
In the Eastern Conference First Round of the 2003 NBA playoffs, the Hornets faced off against the 4th–seeded Philadelphia 76ers, who were led by All-Star guard Allen Iverson, Keith Van Horn and Eric Snow. The 76ers took a 3–1 series lead, but the Hornets managed to win Game 5 on the road, 93–91 at the First Union Center. However, the Hornets lost Game 6 to the 76ers at home, 107–103 at the New Orleans Arena, thus losing the series in six games.

=== Aftermath ===
Following the season, Silas was fired as head coach after four in a half seasons with the Hornets, while Anderson signed as a free agent with the Indiana Pacers, and Pack re-signed with his former team, the New Jersey Nets.

== Draft ==
The New Orleans Hornets had no draft picks in 2002. While still known as the Charlotte Hornets, they had previously traded their first-round pick to the Washington Wizards and their second-round pick to the Milwaukee Bucks.

Because the franchise had relocated from Charlotte, the team went straight to the draft without the typical expansion draft process. Under the 2014 franchise agreement, all pre-2002 records were returned to Charlotte. Consequently, the team is now treated as a 2002 expansion team to account for the split in historical records.

== Roster ==
2002–03 New Orleans Hornets roster
Players

Pos.	No.	Player	Height	Weight	DOB	From
G	32	Courtney Alexander	6 ft 5 in (1.96 m)	205 lb (93 kg)	1977–04–27	Fresno State
G	12	Kenny Anderson	6 ft 0 in (1.83 m)	168 lb (76 kg)	1970–10–09	Georgia Tech
G/F	2	Stacey Augmon	6 ft 8 in (2.03 m)	205 lb (93 kg)	1968–08–01	UNLV
F/C	42	P. J. Brown	6 ft 11 in (2.11 m)	239 lb (108 kg)	1969–10–14	Louisiana Tech
G	1	Baron Davis	6 ft 3 in (1.91 m)	212 lb (96 kg)	1979–04–13	UCLA
G	17	Bryce Drew	6 ft 2 in (1.88 m)	185 lb (84 kg)	1974–09–21	Valparaiso
G/F	9	George Lynch	6 ft 8 in (2.03 m)	218 lb (99 kg)	1970–09–03	North Carolina
C	21	Jamaal Magloire	6 ft 11 in (2.11 m)	265 lb (120 kg)	1978–05–21	Kentucky
F	24	Jamal Mashburn	6 ft 8 in (2.03 m)	240 lb (109 kg)	1972–11–29	Kentucky
C	6	Jérôme Moïso	6 ft 10 in (2.08 m)	235 lb (107 kg)	1978–06–15	UCLA
G	14	Robert Pack	6 ft 2 in (1.88 m)	180 lb (82 kg)	1969–02–03	USC
F/C	34	Robert Traylor	6 ft 8 in (2.03 m)	290 lb (132 kg)	1977–02–01	Michigan
G	4	David Wesley	6 ft 0 in (1.83 m)	203 lb (92 kg)	1970–11–14	Baylor

Coaches
Head coach
- Paul Silas
Assistant(s)
- Jeff Bower
- Bob Donewald Jr.
- Brian Hill
- Stephen Silas

Legend
- (DP) Unsigned draft pick
- (FA) Free agent
- (S) Suspended
- Injured

Roster
Updated: February 20, 2003

== Regular season ==
=== Standings ===
Central Division	W	L	PCT	GB	Home	Road	Div
y-Detroit Pistons	50	32	.610	–	30–11	20–21	19–9
x-Indiana Pacers	48	34	.585	2	32–9	16–25	19–9
x-New Orleans Hornets	47	35	.573	3	29–12	18–23	17–11
x-Milwaukee Bucks	42	40	.512	8	25–16	17–24	16–12
e-Atlanta Hawks	35	47	.427	15	26–15	9–32	14–14
e-Chicago Bulls	30	52	.366	20	27–14	3–38	12–16
e-Toronto Raptors	24	58	.293	26	15–26	9–32	10–18
e-Cleveland Cavaliers	17	65	.207	33	14–27	3–38	5–23

#	Eastern Conference				
#	Team	W	L	PCT	GB
1	c-Detroit Pistons	50	32	.610	–
2	y-New Jersey Nets	49	33	.598	1
3	x-Indiana Pacers	48	34	.585	2
4	x-Philadelphia 76ers	48	34	.585	2
5	x-New Orleans Hornets	47	35	.573	3
6	x-Boston Celtics	44	38	.537	6
7	x-Milwaukee Bucks	42	40	.512	8
8	x-Orlando Magic	42	40	.512	8
9	e-New York Knicks	37	45	.451	13
10	e-Washington Wizards	37	45	.451	13
11	e-Atlanta Hawks	35	47	.427	15
12	e-Chicago Bulls	30	52	.366	20
13	e-Miami Heat	25	57	.305	25
14	e-Toronto Raptors	24	58	.293	26
15	e-Cleveland Cavaliers	17	65	.207	33

=== Game log ===
Game	Date	Opponent	Result	Hornets score	Opponent score	Record	OT
1	October 30	Utah	Win	100	75	1-0	
2	November 1	@ Chicago	Loss	79	84	1-1	
3	November 2	Miami	Win	100	95	2-1	
4	November 6	Seattle	Win	86	84	3-1	
5	November 8	Golden State	Win	110	104	4-1	
6	November 10	@ New York	Win	97	91	5-1	OT
7	November 12	@ Detroit	Loss	87	93	5-2	
8	November 13	Minnesota	Win	102	98	6-2	
9	November 15	Chicago	Win	105	87	7-2	
10	November 16	@ Atlanta	Loss	82	89	7-3	
11	November 19	Philadelphia	Win	99	98	8-3	
12	November 22	New York	Win	105	97	9-3	OT
13	November 23	@ Cleveland	Win	97	84	10-3	
14	November 25	@ Philadelphia	Loss	87	108	10-4	
15	November 27	Atlanta	Win	106	94	11-4	
16	November 30	@ New York	Loss	86	92	11-5	OT
17	December 1	@ Boston	Loss	86	95	11-6	
18	December 3	@ Chicago	Win	115	90	12-6	
19	December 4	Toronto	Win	89	74	13-6	
20	December 6	Houston	Win	98	96	14-6	OT
21	December 7	@ Milwaukee	Win	94	88	15-6	
22	December 9	LA Clippers	Loss	90	94	15-7	
23	December 12	@ Utah	Win	93	88	16-7	
24	December 13	@ LA Lakers	Win	98	82	17-7	
25	December 15	@ Sacramento	Loss	92	107	17-8	
26	December 17	@ Portland	Loss	93	102	17-9	
27	December 18	@ Golden State	Loss	106	111	17-10	
28	December 20	@ Seattle	Win	88	86	18-10	OT
29	December 23	@ San Antonio	Loss	94	99	18-11	OT
30	December 26	Dallas	Loss	81	83	18-12	
31	December 28	@ Indiana	Loss	84	91	18-13	
32	December 29	@ Houston	Loss	85	97	18-14	
33	December 31	Indiana	Loss	86	89	18-15	
34	January 3	Orlando	Win	100	89	19-15	
35	January 5	@ Toronto	Win	99	84	20-15	
36	January 6	@ Memphis	Loss	102	106	20-16	
37	January 8	Boston	Loss	83	93	20-17	
38	January 10	Detroit	Loss	99	101	20-18	OT
39	January 11	@ Atlanta	Loss	80	87	20-19	
40	January 15	LA Lakers	Loss	82	90	20-20	
41	January 17	Chicago	Win	90	83	21-20	
42	January 20	Phoenix	Win	114	103	22-20	
43	January 22	Washington	Win	103	94	23-20	
44	January 24	Portland	Loss	96	97	23-21	OT
45	January 27	Milwaukee	Loss	93	108	23-22	
46	January 29	Toronto	Win	104	83	24-22	
47	January 31	@ New Jersey	Loss	72	89	24-23	
48	February 1	@ Washington	Loss	104	109	24-24	
49	February 3	Boston	Win	103	96	25-24	
50	February 5	Sacramento	Win	108	84	26-24	
51	February 11	@ Miami	Win	78	69	27-24	
52	February 12	Indiana	Loss	72	83	27-25	
53	February 14	@ Minnesota	Loss	93	114	27-26	
54	February 16	Denver	Win	100	92	28-26	
55	February 18	@ Orlando	Loss	94	99	28-27	
56	February 19	Washington	Win	87	75	29-27	
57	February 21	Memphis	Win	125	123	30-27	OT
58	February 22	@ Detroit	Win	93	91	31-27	
59	February 26	Miami	Win	91	82	32-27	
60	February 28	@ Denver	Win	94	88	33-27	
61	March 1	@ Phoenix	Win	97	92	34-27	
62	March 3	@ LA Clippers	Win	111	108	35-27	
63	March 7	Cleveland	Win	102	76	36-27	
64	March 9	New Jersey	Loss	92	102	36-28	
65	March 11	@ Indiana	Win	81	71	37-28	
66	March 12	@ Boston	Loss	65	93	37-29	
67	March 14	@ Miami	Win	87	83	38-29	
68	March 15	@ Orlando	Loss	86	96	38-30	
69	March 19	New York	Win	101	96	39-30	
70	March 21	Milwaukee	Win	113	98	40-30	
71	March 22	@ Milwaukee	Loss	85	93	40-31	
72	March 26	Orlando	Loss	95	97	40-32	
73	March 28	@ Toronto	Win	101	92	41-32	
74	March 30	San Antonio	Loss	90	92	41-33	
75	April 1	@ Dallas	Loss	86	95	41-34	
76	April 2	New Jersey	Win	106	97	42-34	
77	April 5	@ Cleveland	Loss	76	79	42-35	
78	April 9	Cleveland	Win	100	81	43-35	
79	April 11	Detroit	Win	93	89	44-35	
80	April 13	@ Philadelphia	Win	94	89	45-35	
81	April 14	@ New Jersey	Win	87	74	46-35	
82	April 16	Atlanta	Win	92	77	47-35	

== Playoffs ==
At the start of the playoffs, Baron Davis would struggle with back pain. Jamal Mashburn would suffer a dislocated finger in Game 2 of the first round series against the Philadelphia 76ers. The Hornets would force a 6th game, but Davis and Mashburn played hurt. The 76ers would eliminate the Hornets in the sixth game. After the season, the Hornets would stun their fans and most experts by firing Coach Paul Silas.

2003 playoff game log
First Round: 2–4 (home: 1–2; road: 1–2)

Game	Date	Team	Score	High points	High rebounds	High assists	Location Attendance	Series
1	April 20	@ Philadelphia	L 90–98	Jamal Mashburn (28)	P. J. Brown (8)	Baron Davis (6)	First Union Center; 19,711	0–1
2	April 23	@ Philadelphia	L 85–90	David Wesley (24)	Jamaal Magloire (8)	Jamal Mashburn (6)	First Union Center; 20,229	0–2
3	April 26	Philadelphia	W 99–85	Baron Davis (28)	P. J. Brown (12)	Baron Davis (8)	New Orleans Arena; 17,320	1–2
4	April 28	Philadelphia	L 87–96	Baron Davis (34)	P. J. Brown (9)	Baron Davis (7)	New Orleans Arena; 16,243	1–3
5	April 30	@ Philadelphia	W 93–91	Jamal Mashburn (21)	Jamaal Magloire (12)	Baron Davis (10)	First Union Center; 19,403	2–3
6	May 2	Philadelphia	L 103–107	Jamal Mashburn (36)	three players tied (8)	Baron Davis (11)	New Orleans Arena; 18,570	2–4

2003 schedule

== Player statistics ==
Legend
GP	Games played	GS	Games started	MPG	Minutes per game
FG%	Field-goal percentage	3P%	3-point field-goal percentage	FT%	Free-throw percentage
RPG	Rebounds per game	APG	Assists per game	SPG	Steals per game
BPG	Blocks per game	PPG	Points per game

=== Season ===
Player	GP	GS	MPG	FG%	3FG%	FT%	RPG	APG	SPG	BPG	PPG
Courtney Alexander	66	7	20.6	.382	.333	.808	1.8	1.2	.5	.1	7.9
Kenny Anderson	23	1	19.4	.407	.500	.727	2.0	3.3	.8	.2	6.0
Stacey Augmon	70	3	12.3	.411	.000	.750	1.7	1.0	.4	.1	3.0
P.J. Brown	78	78	33.4	.531	.000	.836	9.0	1.9	.9	1.0	10.7
Elden Campbell	41	1	16.7	.409	.000	.809	3.5	1.0	.6	.8	7.2
Baron Davis	50	47	37.8	.416	.350	.710	3.7	6.4	1.8	.4	17.1
Bryce Drew	13	0	6.1	.296	.429	.	1.0	.8	.2	.0	1.5
Kirk Haston	12	0	4.8	.118	.000	.500	.6	.3	.0	.4	.5
Randy Livingston	2	0	6.0	.500	.	1.000	.0	.5	.0	.0	3.0
George Lynch	81	32	18.5	.409	.354	.554	4.4	1.3	.8	.2	4.5
Jamaal Magloire	82	82	29.8	.480	.000	.717	8.8	1.1	.6	1.4	10.3
Jamal Mashburn	82	81	40.5	.422	.389	.848	6.1	5.6	1.0	.2	21.6
Jérôme Moïso	51	1	12.6	.520	.	.659	3.5	.4	.4	.9	4.0
Robert Pack	28	4	15.7	.403	.000	.745	1.8	2.9	.9	.0	5.2
Robert Traylor	69	0	12.3	.443	.333	.648	3.8	.7	.7	.5	3.9
David Wesley	73	73	37.1	.433	.424	.781	2.4	3.4	1.5	.1	16.7

=== Playoffs ===
Player	GP	GS	MPG	FG%	3FG%	FT%	RPG	APG	SPG	BPG	PPG
Courtney Alexander	5	0	7.8	.438	1.000	.750	.8	.2	.4	.0	3.6
Kenny Anderson	5	0	10.2	.333	.	1.000	.4	1.8	.6	.0	2.2
Stacey Augmon	4	0	17.3	.333	.	.875	2.5	.8	.8	.0	4.3
P.J. Brown	6	6	32.2	.477	.	.760	7.7	1.0	1.2	.5	10.2
Baron Davis	5	5	38.8	.446	.343	.727	3.6	8.4	1.4	.4	20.4
George Lynch	6	3	27.2	.429	.278	.250	6.2	1.7	1.0	.8	7.0
Jamaal Magloire	6	6	31.3	.449	.	.758	8.3	.3	.7	1.0	11.5
Jamal Mashburn	4	4	40.5	.430	.400	.714	3.5	5.3	1.0	.3	24.8
Jérôme Moïso	4	0	15.0	.625	.	.750	4.0	1.3	.0	1.8	5.8
Robert Pack	4	0	10.5	.462	.	1.000	.3	1.0	.0	.0	3.8
Robert Traylor	6	0	15.7	.455	.	.250	5.0	.7	.5	.8	3.5
David Wesley	6	6	30.8	.403	.412	1.000	1.2	2.2	.8	.2	13.2

Player statistics citation:

== Awards and records ==
=== Awards ===
- Jamal Mashburn, All-NBA Third Team

== Transactions ==
=== Free agents ===
==== Additions ====
Player	Signed	Former team

==== Subtractions ====
Player	Left	New team

== See also ==
- 2002–03 NBA season
