= Jamaal Magloire =

Canadian basketball player (born 1978)

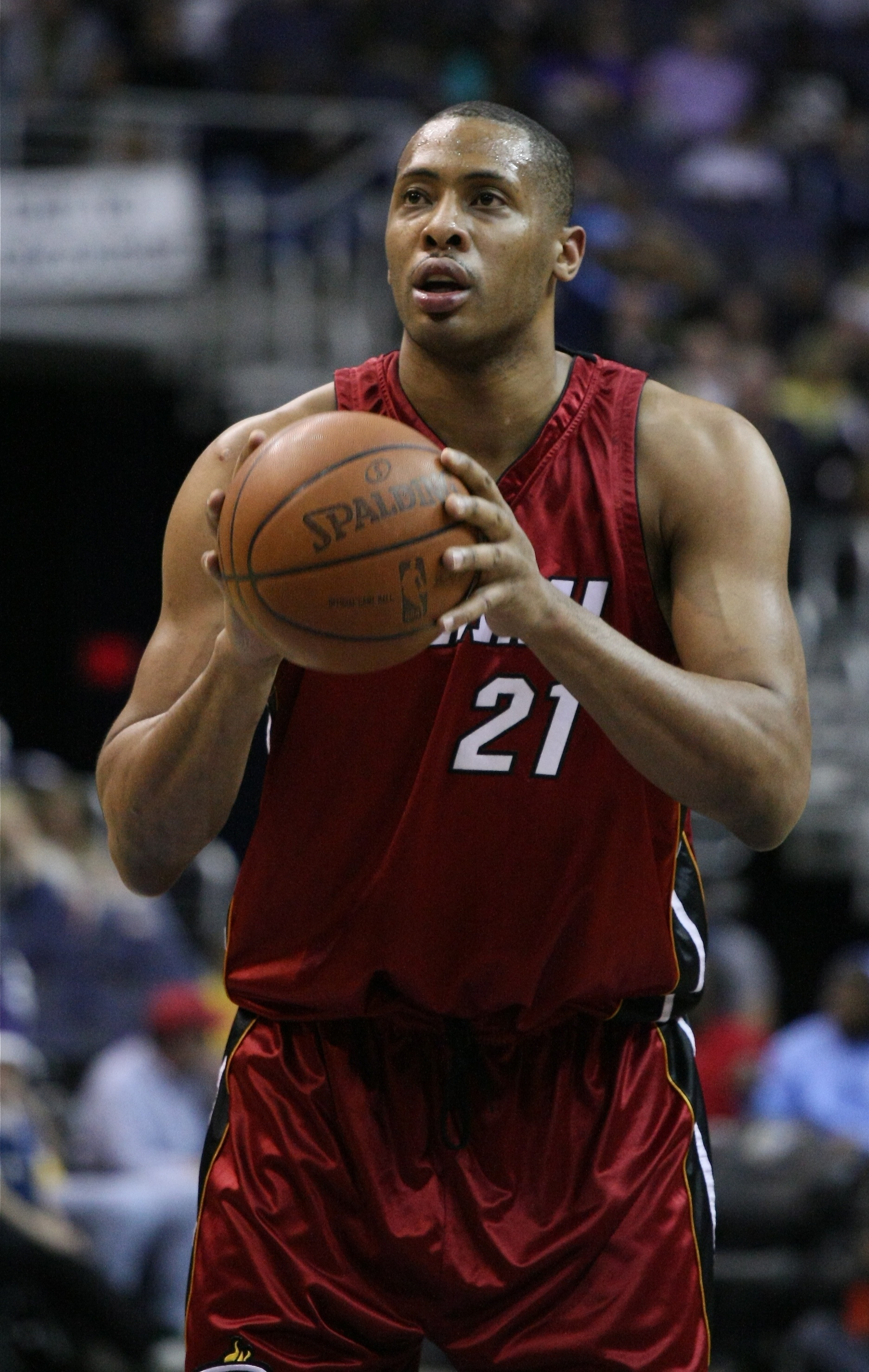
- Magloire with the Miami Heat in 2009

Personal information
- Born: May 21, 1978 (age 48) Toronto, Ontario, Canada
- Listed height: 6 ft 11 in (2.11 m)
- Listed weight: 265 lb (120 kg)

Career information
- High school: Eastern Commerce (Toronto, Ontario)
- College: Kentucky (1996–2000)
- NBA draft: 2000: 1st round, 19th overall pick
- Drafted by: Charlotte Hornets
- Playing career: 2000–2012
- Position: Center
- Number: 21, 20
- Coaching career: 2013–present

Career history
- 2000–2002: Charlotte Hornets
- 2002–2005: New Orleans Hornets
- 2005–2006: Milwaukee Bucks
- 2006–2007: Portland Trail Blazers
- 2007–2008: New Jersey Nets
- 2008: Dallas Mavericks
- 2008–2011: Miami Heat
- 2011–2012: Toronto Raptors

Career highlights
- NBA All-Star (2004); NCAA champion (1998); First-team All-SEC (2000); SEC All-Freshman Team (1997)

Career NBA statistics
- Points: 4,917 (7.2 ppg)
- Rebounds: 4,408 (6.5 rpg)
- Blocks: 603 (0.9 bpg)
- Stats at NBA.com
- Stats at Basketball Reference

Jamaal Dane Magloire (pronounced /jəˈmɑːl məˈɡlɔːr/; born May 21, 1978) is a Canadian former professional basketball player who currently serves as basketball development consultant and community ambassador for the Toronto Raptors. He played 12 seasons in the National Basketball Association (NBA) for the Charlotte Hornets, New Orleans Hornets, Milwaukee Bucks, Portland Trail Blazers, New Jersey Nets, Dallas Mavericks, Miami Heat, and Toronto Raptors. The 6 ft 11 in (2.11 m), 265 lb (120 kg; 18.9 st) center was selected out of the University of Kentucky by the Charlotte Hornets, with the 19th overall pick in the 2000 NBA draft, after withdrawing his name from the previous draft. He was voted into the NBA All-Star Game in 2004, becoming the second Canadian All-Star in NBA history. In June 2026, Complex Canada placed Magloire ninth in their ranking of The 20 Best Canadian Basketball Players of All Time.

== Early life ==
Magloire was born in Toronto, Ontario, to Trinidadian immigrant parents, Garth, a welder, and Marion, an insurance worker. He was raised in the city's Scarborough district and attended high school at Eastern Commerce Collegiate Institute, where he led the school's grade 12 boys basketball team to back-to-back Ontario provincial championships in 1995 and 1996.

== College career ==
In 1996, Magloire enrolled at the University of Kentucky. He was named to the SEC All-Freshman team in 1997. Magloire started 12 games as a sophomore for the Kentucky Wildcats team that won the national championship in 1998. He was a first-team All-Southeastern Conference (SEC) selection in his senior season. He finished his college career as Kentucky's all-time leader in blocked shots, with 268. Magloire's tenure with the Wildcats earned him the nickname "Big Cat".

== NBA career ==
=== Charlotte / New Orleans Hornets (2000–2005) ===
He was drafted by the Charlotte Hornets with the 19th pick of the 2000 NBA draft, and filled a reserve role for his first two seasons in which he averaged 6.5 points in 16.8 minutes per game. In the 2002–03 season, the Hornets' first year in New Orleans, he started all 82 games, averaging 10.3 points and 8.8 rebounds per game.

During the 2003–04 season, Magloire averaged 13.6 points and 10.3 rebounds per game while starting all 82 games, and was named to the Eastern Conference All-Star Team. He became only the second Canadian All-Star in NBA history, after Steve Nash. Magloire played well, leading the Eastern All-Stars with 19 points, along with 8 rebounds in 21 minutes of action.

=== Milwaukee Bucks (2005–2006) ===
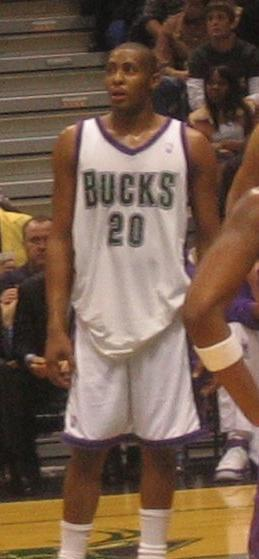
Magloire with the Milwaukee Bucks in 2006

On October 26, 2005, he was traded to the Milwaukee Bucks in exchange for Desmond Mason, a 2006 first-round draft pick and cash considerations. On January 21, 2006, Magloire recorded a career-high 22 rebounds and scored 13 points, during a 101–91 win over the Charlotte Bobcats.

=== Portland Trail Blazers (2006–2007) ===
On July 31, 2006, during the off-season, Magloire was traded to the Portland Trail Blazers for Steve Blake, Ha Seung-Jin, and Brian Skinner.

Although Magloire has averaged nearly 10 points per game throughout his entire NBA career, he did not score over nine points in a single game during his first 20 games as a Trail Blazer. In fact, only eight times did Magloire record over 11 points during 81 regular season games in the 2006–07 season. Magloire finished the season with an average of only 21 minutes played per game, down from 30 minutes played in the previous two seasons. Magloire became a free agent in the off-season.

=== New Jersey Nets (2007–2008) ===
The New Jersey Nets signed Magloire on July 17, 2007. In the 2007–08 season, he played little, averaging only 1.8 points and 3.4 rebounds per game. Magloire was waived by the Nets on February 22, 2008.

=== Dallas Mavericks (2008) ===
The Dallas Mavericks signed Magloire on February 26, 2008, to back up centre Erick Dampier after former Maverick center DeSagana Diop was traded to the New Jersey Nets in the blockbuster trade involving point guards Devin Harris and Jason Kidd.

=== Miami Heat (2008–2011) ===
Magloire signed with the Miami Heat on August 30, 2008, for the veteran's minimum after nearing the luxury tax threshold. Magloire provided additional depth and experience at the centre position. He was upgraded to starter on Monday, January 26, 2009, vs. the Atlanta Hawks. Miami re-signed Magloire with the Heat for the 2009–10 season. Magloire was valued as an enforcer during his tenure with Miami. On July 19, 2010, the Heat re-signed Magloire for the 2010–11 season. The Heat would make it to the 2011 NBA Finals, and fell short to the Dallas Mavericks in six games.

=== Toronto Raptors (2011–2012) ===
On December 9, 2011, Magloire signed a one-year deal with his hometown team the Toronto Raptors for the veteran's minimum. This marked the first time a Canadian born player played for the Raptors, the only NBA franchise in Canada. Magloire re-signed with the team on September 18, 2012, but was waived by the team on October 27, 2012. After being waived by the Raptors, Magloire would not play again in the NBA. Thus, his final NBA game was played on April 26, 2012, in a 98–67 win over the New Jersey Nets (the lowest amount of points the Nets scored that season). In his final game, Magloire was the Raptors' starting Center, he played for 5 minutes and recorded 4 rebounds.

== NBA career statistics ==
Legend
GP	Games played	GS	Games started	MPG	Minutes per game
FG%	Field goal percentage	3P%	3-point field goal percentage	FT%	Free throw percentage
RPG	Rebounds per game	APG	Assists per game	SPG	Steals per game
BPG	Blocks per game	PPG	Points per game	**Bold**	Career high
*	Led the league

=== Regular season ===
Year	Team	GP	GS	MPG	FG%	3P%	FT%	RPG	APG	SPG	BPG	PPG
2000–01	Charlotte	74	0	14.8	.450	.000	.655	4.0	.4	.2	1.1	4.6
2001–02	Charlotte	**82**	8	18.9	.551	.000	.730	5.6	.4	.3	1.0	8.5
2002–03	New Orleans	**82**	**82***	29.8	.480	.000	.717	8.8	1.1	**.6**	**1.4**	10.3
2003–04	New Orleans	**82**	**82**	**33.9**	.473	.000	**.751**	**10.3**	1.0	.5	1.2	**13.6**
2004–05	New Orleans	23	22	30.6	.432	.000	.602	8.9	**1.3**	.3	1.0	11.7
2005–06	Milwaukee	**82***	**82***	30.1	.467	.000	.535	9.5	.7	.4	1.0	9.2
2006–07	Portland	81	23	21.0	.504	.000	.541	6.1	.4	.3	.8	6.5
2007–08	New Jersey	24	2	10.8	.306	.000	.452	3.4	.3	.0	.4	1.8
2007–08	Dallas	7	0	3.9	.500	.000	.462	1.1	.0	.1	.0	1.7
2008–09	Miami	55	12	12.9	.496	.000	.483	4.0	.4	.2	.5	2.9
2009–10	Miami	36	0	10.0	.500	.000	.356	3.4	.0	.3	.3	2.1
2010–11	Miami	18	0	8.8	**.591**	.000	.500	3.4	.2	.2	.1	1.9
2011–12	Toronto	34	1	11.0	.378	.000	.259	3.3	.2	.1	.3	1.2
Career		680	314	21.5	.480	.000	.639	6.5	.6	.3	.9	7.2
All-Star		1	0	21.0	.563	.000	.500	8.0	.0	1.0	1.0	19.0

=== Playoffs ===
Year	Team	GP	GS	MPG	FG%	3P%	FT%	RPG	APG	SPG	BPG	PPG
2001	Charlotte	**10**	0	11.0	**.571**	.000	.304	2.8	.3	.0	.6	3.9
2002	Charlotte	8	0	21.0	.550	.000	**.761**	5.6	.6	.0	**1.9**	**12.3**
2003	New Orleans	6	6	31.3	.449	.000	.758	8.3	.3	**.7**	1.0	11.5
2004	New Orleans	7	**7**	**34.1**	.418	.000	.750	**9.1**	.7	.4	1.0	11.0
2006	Milwaukee	5	5	27.0	.474	.000	.600	8.0	**1.0**	.4	1.2	9.0
2009	Miami	6	0	7.8	.333	.000	.000	1.8	.2	.0	.0	.3
2010	Miami	1	0	5.0	.000	.000	.000	1.0	.0	.0	.0	.0
2011	Miami	3	0	6.0	.400	.000	.000	1.7	.7	.3	.0	1.3
Career		46	18	19.8	.470	.000	.682	5.3	.5	.2	.9	7.3

== Post-playing career ==
On November 18, 2012, the Toronto Raptors hired Magloire as their basketball development consultant and community ambassador. The role involves Magloire assisting the Raptors' coaching staff with the individual skill development of their players in practices and games, while also making corporate/community appearances throughout the season on behalf of the team.

== Personal life ==
In the early morning hours of June 23, 2001, Magloire's half-brother, 19-year-old Justin Sheppard, was shot and killed on the footbridge that spans the ravine around Rosedale Valley Road between Bloor Street East and Glen Road near Sherbourne subway station in Toronto. Like Magloire, Sheppard was a promising basketball talent at Eastern Commerce, and was supposed to begin a scholarship at a Maryland prep school that fall. Magloire helped post a CAD $50,000 reward, but to date, there have been no arrests and the killing remains unsolved.

== See also ==
- List of Canadians in the National Basketball Association
