= Baron Davis =

American basketball player (born 1979)

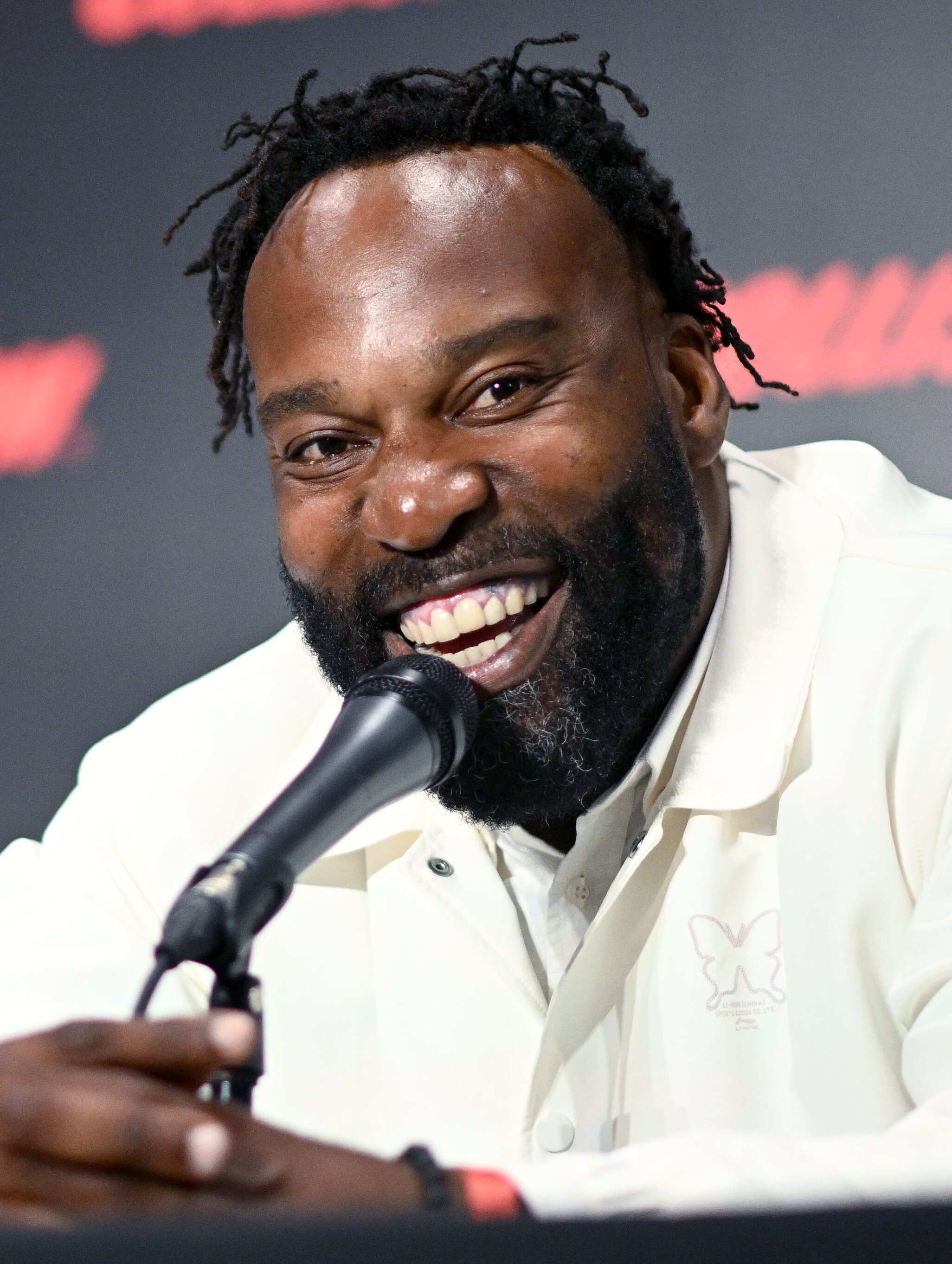
- Davis in 2023

Personal information
- Born: April 13, 1979 (age 47) Los Angeles, California, U.S.
- Listed height: 6 ft 3 in (1.91 m)
- Listed weight: 212 lb (96 kg)

Career information
- High school: Crossroads School (Santa Monica, California)
- College: UCLA (1997–1999)
- NBA draft: 1999: 1st round, 3rd overall pick
- Drafted by: Charlotte Hornets
- Playing career: 1999–2012; 2016
- Position: Point guard
- Number: 1, 5, 85, 24

Career history
- 1999–2002: Charlotte Hornets
- 2002–2005: New Orleans Hornets
- 2005–2008: Golden State Warriors
- 2008–2011: Los Angeles Clippers
- 2011: Cleveland Cavaliers
- 2011–2012: New York Knicks
- 2016: Delaware 87ers

Career highlights
- 2× NBA All-Star (2002, 2004); All-NBA Third Team (2004); 2× NBA steals leader (2004, 2007); Third-team All-American – AP (1999); First-team All-Pac-10 (1999); Pac-10 Freshman of the Year (1998); Pac-10 All-Freshman Team (1998); Gatorade Player of the Year (1997); First-team Parade All-American (1997); McDonald's All-American (1997); California Mr. Basketball (1997)

Career NBA statistics
- Points: 13,447 (16.1 ppg)
- Assists: 6,025 (7.2 apg)
- Steals: 1,530 (1.8 spg)
- Stats at NBA.com
- Stats at Basketball Reference
Medals
Men's basketball
Representing the United States
Goodwill Games
Gold medal – first place	2001 Brisbane	National team

Baron Walter Louis Davis (born April 13, 1979) is an American former professional basketball player who is a television host and sports analyst. He was a two-time NBA All-Star, made the All-NBA Third Team in 2004, and twice led the NBA in steals. He was drafted with the third overall pick in the 1999 NBA draft by the Charlotte Hornets. He also played in the NBA for the New Orleans Hornets, Golden State Warriors, Los Angeles Clippers, Cleveland Cavaliers, and New York Knicks. Davis played college basketball for the UCLA Bruins, earning All-American honors before turning professional after his sophomore year. He was a star high school player while at Crossroads School. Davis holds the NBA's career playoff record for steals per game with an average of 2.28 over 50 games.

== Early life ==
Davis was born in Los Angeles and grew up in the South Central area. His grandmother and guardian, Lela Nicholson, was instrumental in pushing him to play basketball. With her encouragement, he eventually enrolled at Crossroads School, a private school in Santa Monica.

As a senior at Crossroads, Davis led his team to the championship of The Beach Ball Classic tournament in Myrtle Beach, South Carolina, over perennial prep powerhouse Simon Gratz High School (Philadelphia, Pennsylvania), while earning MVP honors and a spot on the All-Tournament team along with future St. John's standout Erick Barkley at that event. That year, Davis was also named Gatorade National Player of the Year and a Parade All-American. He was also selected to play in the McDonald's All-American Gamein Colorado Springs in 1997, playing with future NBA players Elton Brand, Shane Battier, Larry Hughes and Ron Artest.

== College career ==
After a highly contested recruiting battle that saw Kansas, Georgia Tech, Duke, and UCLA in hot pursuit for his services, Davis selected UCLA as college choice, so that he could play in front of his family and friends. During this time, Davis was involved in a minor controversy pertaining to his driving a 1991 Chevy Blazer that was a gift from his sister, then a UCLA employee. The car was sold to her by Jim Harrick's son. At the time, Harrick was the UCLA men's basketball coach, presenting both a conflict of interest and a potential recruiting violation, since rumor had it that the car was purchased below market value. The controversy subsided when it was discovered that Davis's sister had, in fact, bought the car at fair market value. Davis then enrolled at UCLA in 1997 without problem. In 1998, Davis was named the Pac-10 Freshman of the Year and made the third-team All-American his sophomore year in 1999.

In Davis's two years at UCLA, he averaged 13.6 points and 5.1 assists for the Bruins. While coming down from a dunk during an NCAA Tournament game his freshman year, he injured his knee and tore his anterior cruciate ligament (ACL). Surprisingly, though, he made a full recovery the next season and seemed to have regained nearly all of the speed, quickness, and explosiveness he had before the injury while doing enough on the basketball court to warrant his declaring for the 1999 NBA draft after his sophomore campaign.

== Professional career ==
=== Charlotte Hornets (1999–2002) ===
Davis was the third pick in the 1999 NBA draft by the Charlotte Hornets. In his NBA debut, a 100–86 win over the Orlando Magic, Davis scored nine points, and added five rebounds, two assists and two steals. In Davis's first year, he backed up Eddie Jones and David Wesley, as the Hornets lost in the first round of the playoffs to the 76ers in four games.

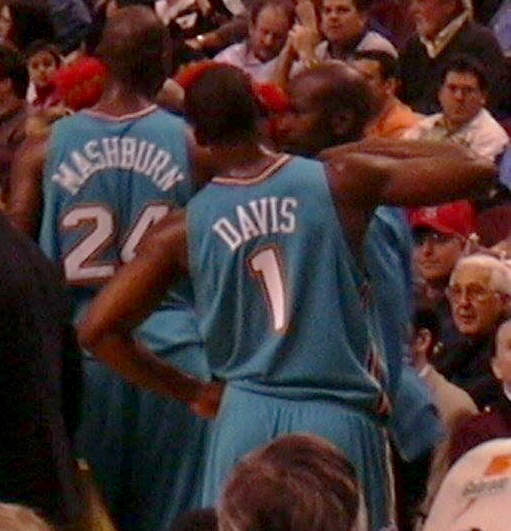
Davis, pictured here in 2003, was drafted by the Hornets in 1999

Davis saw better success the following year, as his averages in points, assists, steals and minutes per game all increased and he started all 82 games for the Hornets. Davis lead the Hornets back into the playoffs, and swept the Miami Heat before being defeated by the Ray Allen-led Milwaukee Bucks in seven games in the second round. Davis is credited with making the longest shot in NBA history at the Bradley Center on February 17, 2001, when he made an 89-foot (27 m) shot with 0.7 seconds remaining in the third quarter against the Bucks. During All-Star weekend, he also participated in the Slam Dunk Contest and the Rising Stars Challenge

The next season, Davis again started all 82 games while averaging 18 points and 8.5 assists per game. He was also selected as an injury replacement for Vince Carter in the 2002 NBA All-Star Game. The Hornets made the playoffs with Davis for the third time in as many years, but after defeating the Tracy McGrady-led Orlando Magic in the opening round, they were eliminated in the second round by the Jason Kidd-led New Jersey Nets.

=== New Orleans Hornets (2002–2005) ===
In the summer of 2002, the Hornets relocated from Charlotte, North Carolina, to New Orleans. In the New Orleans Hornets' inaugural season, Davis suffered multiple injuries that limited him to just 50 games. He was still able to lead the Hornets back to the playoffs, but they would fall to the Allen Iverson-led Philadelphia 76ers in the first round. Iverson would later describe Davis as the most difficult defensive assignment of his career.

The following season saw injuries limited Davis to 67 games. Despite this, he led the league in steals per game, was voted an All-Star for the second time, and earned an All-NBA third team selection. Davis also won the Skills Challenge during All-Star Weekend. The Hornets were ultimately ousted in the first round of the playoffs by the Miami Heat then led by Lamar Odom, Caron Butler, Eddie Jones, Brian Grant and rookie Dwyane Wade in seven games.

The Hornets made the playoffs in each of Davis's five years with the team, and only advanced past the first round in the two years he started every game. After Davis was traded to Golden State, New Orleans failed to make the playoffs for three straight years. He played for the U.S. national team in the 2002 FIBA World Championship.

=== Golden State Warriors (2005–2008) ===
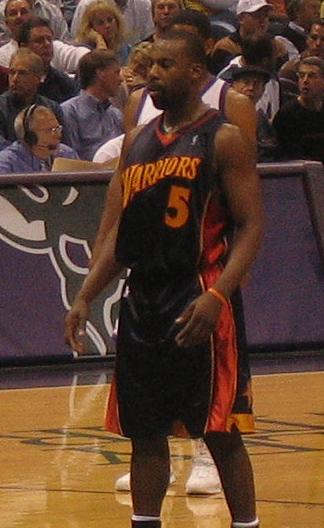
Davis with the Warriors in 2005

On February 24, 2005, Davis was traded from the Hornets to the Golden State Warriors for guard Speedy Claxton and veteran forward Dale Davis after tension with the Hornets' coaching staff and several nagging injuries. The move created one of the more potent backcourts in the NBA with Davis and star guard Jason Richardson. It also saw Davis's return to California, where he had craved to return since his college days at UCLA.

After two seasons in which the Warriors underachieved under coach Mike Montgomery, the Warriors hired former coach Don Nelson for the 2006–07 season. His high-scoring offensive system was designed to fit Davis's up-tempo style. Although Davis suffered through knee soreness and underwent surgery during the season, he still led the league in steals per game and the Warriors to their first playoff appearance since 1994. The Warriors swept the regular season series against the Mavericks 3–0, giving them an advantage and won the series against the top-seeded Dallas Mavericks 4–2, making them the first No. 8 seed to beat a No. 1 seed since the NBA changed the 1st round from a 5-game series to a 7-game series. It was numerically the largest upset in the history of the NBA playoffs, with the 67–15 Mavericks' regular-season win–loss record 25 games better than the 42–40 Warriors'. Davis averaged 25 points per game in the series.

Steve Kerr, then television analyst, called Davis's performance in the 2007 NBA playoffs "outrageous...stunningly athletic and creative and explosive." Davis's playoff highlights included numerous acrobatic layups, a buzzer-beating half-court three-pointer, and a memorable dunk over Andrei Kirilenko. The Utah Jazz eliminated the undersized Warriors 4 games to 1. Davis averaged 25.3 points, 6.5 assists, 2.9 steals, and 4.5 rebounds per game in the 2007 Playoffs.

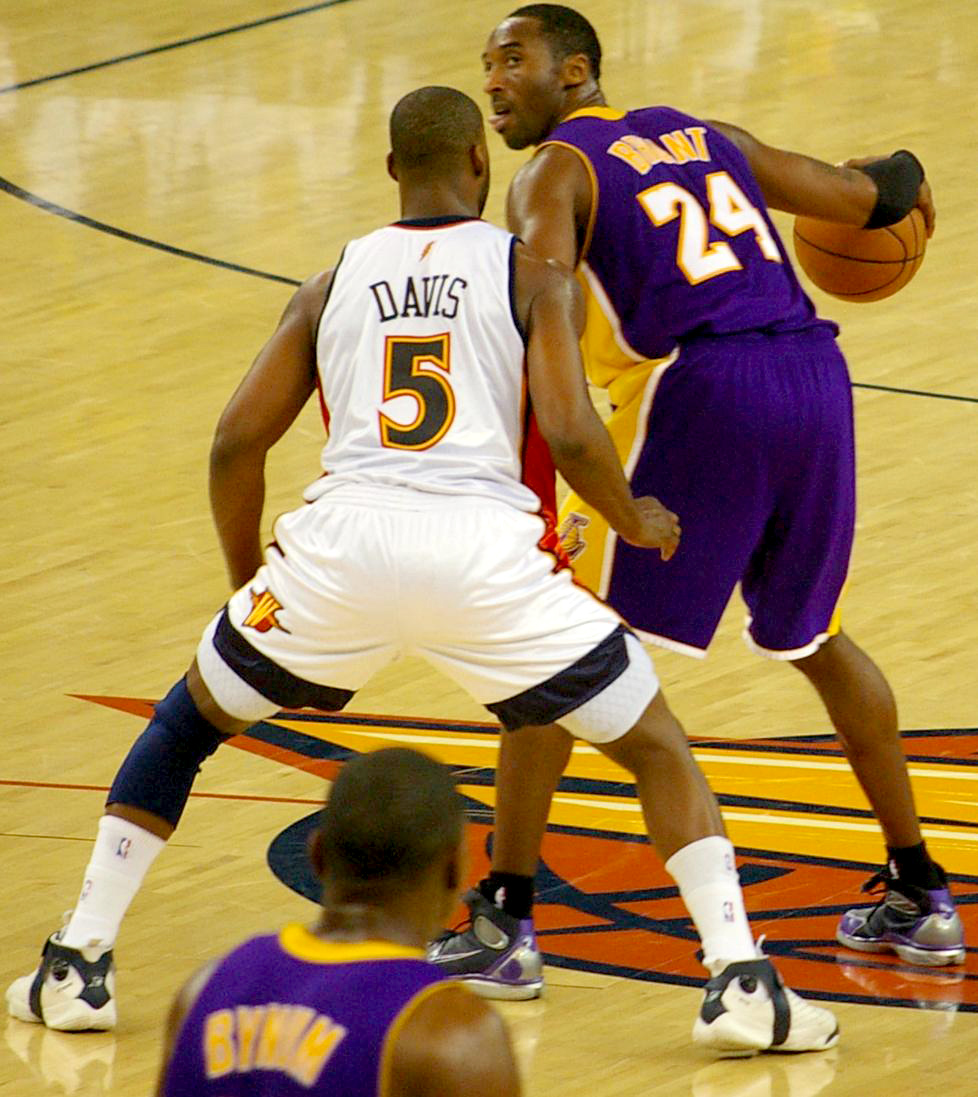
Davis defending Kobe Bryant

In 2008, during a playoff elimination game against the Phoenix Suns, Coach Nelson benched Davis at halftime due to his poor play (shooting 2–13 in 17 minutes). Down fourteen at the half, the Warriors lost by six. Some sportswriters criticized Nelson's decision to bench his team's star with an entire half left to play; other writers speculated about possible friction between Davis and Nelson, which Nelson denied. After the 2007–08 season, in which the Warriors were narrowly edged out of playoff contention despite a record of 48–34 (led by Davis—who remained injury-free throughout the season—with averages of 21.8 PPG, 7.6 assists, 2.3 steals, 4.6 RPG), Davis's agent Todd Ramasar stated that Davis might opt out of his contract with the Warriors, which would have paid him $17.8 million, to pursue other options. On June 30, 2008, Davis opted out of his contract with the Golden State Warriors.

=== Los Angeles Clippers (2008–2011) ===
On July 1, 2008, Davis verbally agreed to a 5-year, $65 million deal to play for his hometown team, the Los Angeles Clippers, and officially signed with the Clippers on July 10, 2008. Davis initially decided to join the Clippers with the intent of playing with Elton Brand, but Brand shockingly opted out of his contract to sign with the Philadelphia 76ers. After officially signing with the Clippers, Davis said that Brand's departure had no impact on his decision to come to Los Angeles.

Prior to Davis's arrival, the Clippers had never even won their division or conference, and had only advanced past the first round of the playoffs twice since entering the league in 1970. Davis promised to change that, and despite Brand's departure, Clippers fans remained excited to have a star who could compete with crosstown rival Kobe Bryant's popularity.

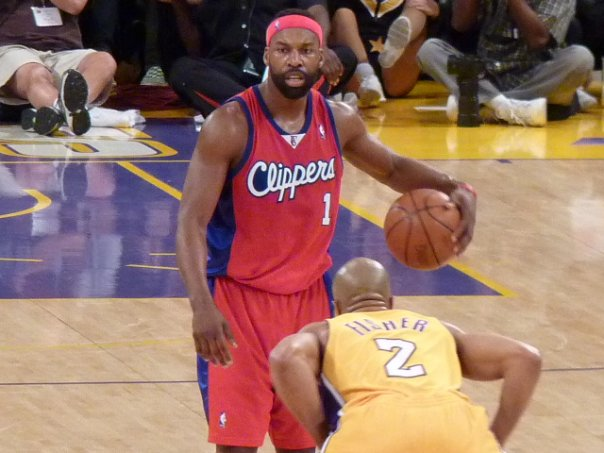
Davis with the ball, defended by Derek Fisher

Davis's first year with the Clippers was marked with a series of injuries and disappointments, as the Clippers struggled to a 19–63 record in which Davis was only able to play 65 games, and saw his points per game average and field goal percentage take a steep decline. Despite this, Davis did produce a few bright spots on the year. On November 22, he scored 30 points and handed out 10 assists in a game against the New Jersey Nets. He also had a pair of 20-assist games on the year.

On November 20, 2009, at a home game vs the Denver Nuggets, Baron reached and surpassed the 5,000-assist mark. In his third year with the Clippers, a rejuvenated and healthy Davis saw some success playing alongside youngsters Eric Gordon, DeAndre Jordan and Rookie of the Year Blake Griffin. While Davis was finally showing the ability that prompted Clippers management to sign him, run-ins with the coaching staff and Clippers' owner Donald Sterling as well as the team's decision to get younger and rebuild, made the Clippers decide to move in a new direction.

=== Cleveland Cavaliers (2011) ===
On February 24, 2011, Davis was traded to the Cleveland Cavaliers along with a first-round pick (which turned out to be the first overall pick in the 2011 NBA draft, Kyrie Irving), in exchange for Mo Williams and Jamario Moon. This trade to Cleveland marked a reunion between Davis and former coach Byron Scott, to which Davis was quoted as saying "I know we're together for a reason. There's some things my game can benefit from just playing in his system". Davis chose to wear no. 85 to honor his grandparents who raised him in Los Angeles and whose house was on 85th Street. In his debut with the Cavs, Baron scored 18 points, grabbed 4 rebounds, had 5 assists, and made four three-point shots, in a win over the New York Knicks.

Despite joining a Cavaliers team who at the time of the trade had the worst record in the NBA (which included a record-setting 26-game losing streak), Davis helped the Cavaliers close the season with several victories, including a 102–90 upset victory over LeBron James and the Miami Heat, to ensure that Cleveland did not have the worst record in the league at the season's end.

On December 14, 2011, the Cavaliers waived Davis via the amnesty clause. He still made the $30 million over the two years left on his contract, but it did not count against Cleveland's salary cap. The Cavaliers had drafted Kyrie Irving with their first overall pick, and wanted to give him the starting point guard spot, allowing Davis to seek a starting job on a contending team. The Knicks, Heat and Lakers were in the market for a point guard at the time.

=== New York Knicks (2011–2012) ===
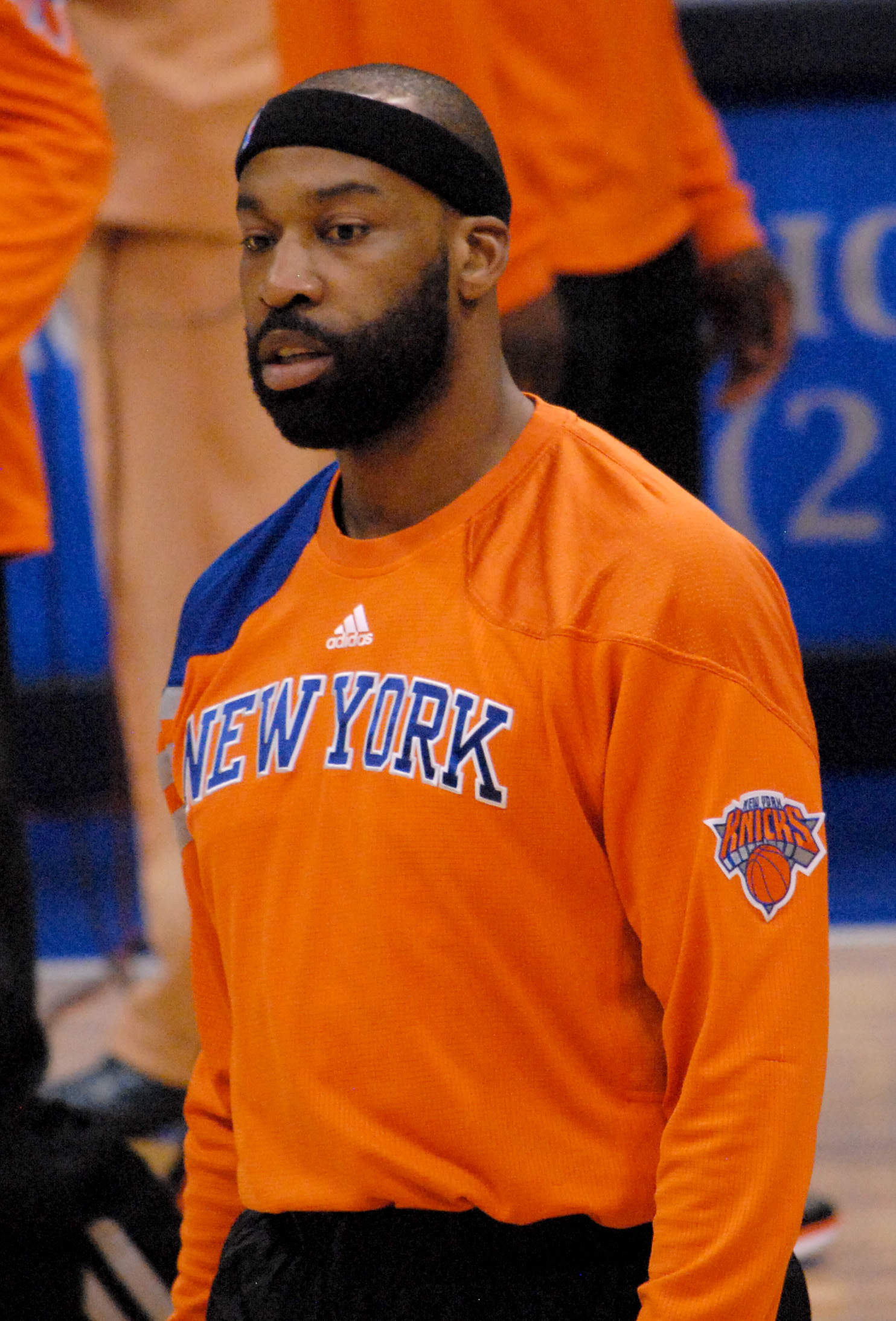
Davis with the New York Knicks in 2012

On December 19, 2011, Davis signed a one-year contract with the New York Knicks, choosing New York over the Lakers and Heat who also expressed interest in signing Davis. At the time of the signing, Davis had a herniated disk in his back. He did not make his debut for the Knicks until February 20, 2012, coming off the bench to score a three-pointer along with an assist.

Davis took over as the Knicks' starting point guard following the season-ending injury to Jeremy Lin. He also started the four playoff games he played in. On May 6, 2012, during Game 4 of the first round of the playoffs in New York's win against the Miami Heat, Davis injured his right knee while dribbling down the court. He was carted off the court on a stretcher. He underwent surgery after an MRI revealed a partial tear of the patellar tendon in his right knee and complete tears of the right ACL and MCL.

=== Delaware 87ers (2016) ===
Davis became an unrestricted free agent in the summer of 2012, but he was expected to be out until May 2013 while recovering from his surgery. He made a return to the basketball court in July 2015, scoring 44 points in the Drew League (which was the subject of his documentary The Drew: No Excuse, Just Produce), and subsequently announced his interest in returning to the NBA. On January 15, 2016, he signed a contract to play in the NBA Development League, and on March 2, he was acquired by the Delaware 87ers. Two days later, he made his D-League debut in a 114–106 loss to the Iowa Energy, recording eight points, one rebound, four assists and three steals in 19 minutes off the bench. In six games for Delaware to conclude the 2015–16 season, Davis averaged 12.8 points, 2.5 rebounds, 3.5 assists and 1.2 steals per game.

Davis participated in the 2017 NBA Celebrity All-Star Game as part of Michael Smith's West Team. On June 22, 2018, Davis made his debut for 3's Company of the Big3 league, leading the team with 17 points and 9 rebounds in a 21-point win. Davis finished the 2018 season with averages of 15.2 points, 4 rebounds, 1.2 assists, and 1 steal in five games played; he ranked 5th in the league in steals per game, 5th in 3-pointers, and 6th in 3-point percentage.

== NBA career statistics ==
Legend
GP	Games played	GS	Games started	MPG	Minutes per game
FG%	Field goal percentage	3P%	3-point field goal percentage	FT%	Free throw percentage
RPG	Rebounds per game	APG	Assists per game	SPG	Steals per game
BPG	Blocks per game	PPG	Points per game	**Bold**	Career high
*	Led the league	‡	NBA record

=== Regular season ===
Year	Team	GP	GS	MPG	FG%	3P%	FT%	RPG	APG	SPG	BPG	PPG
1999–00	Charlotte	**82**	0	18.6	.420	.225	.634	2.0	3.8	1.2	.2	5.9
2000–01	Charlotte	**82**	**82***	38.9	.427	.310	.677	**5.0**	7.3	2.1	.4	13.8
2001–02	Charlotte	**82**	**82**	**40.5**	.417	.356	.580	4.3	8.5	2.1	**.6**	18.1
2002–03	New Orleans	50	47	37.8	.416	.350	.710	3.7	6.4	1.8	.4	17.1
2003–04	New Orleans	67	66	40.1	.395	.321	.673	4.3	7.5	**2.4***	.4	**22.9**
2004–05	New Orleans	18	13	32.9	.366	.321	.771	3.7	7.2	1.7	.2	18.9
2004–05	Golden State	28	19	35.3	.401	.341	.755	3.9	8.3	1.8	.4	19.5
2005–06	Golden State	54	48	36.5	.389	.315	.675	4.4	**8.9**	1.6	.3	17.9
2006–07	Golden State	63	62	35.3	**.439**	.304	.745	4.4	8.1	2.1*	.5	20.1
2007–08	Golden State	**82***	**82***	39.0	.426	.330	.750	4.7	7.6	2.3	.5	21.8
2008–09	L.A. Clippers	65	60	34.6	.370	.302	.757	3.7	7.7	1.7	.5	14.9
2009–10	L.A. Clippers	75	73	33.6	.406	.277	**.821**	3.5	8.0	1.7	**.6**	15.3
2010–11	L.A. Clippers	43	35	29.5	.416	.296	.760	2.8	7.0	1.4	.5	12.8
2010–11	Cleveland	15	9	25.3	.421	**.414**	.815	2.4	6.1	1.1	.4	13.9
2011–12	New York	29	14	20.5	.370	.306	.667	1.9	4.7	1.2	.1	6.1
Career		835	692	34.2	.409	.320	.711	3.8	7.2	1.8	.4	16.1
All-Star		2	0	14.5	.286	.111	.000	.5	6.0	.5	.0	4.5

=== Playoffs ===
Year	Team	GP	GS	MPG	FG%	3P%	FT%	RPG	APG	SPG	BPG	PPG
2000	Charlotte	4	0	14.3	.435	.167	.500	1.5	1.5	1.0	.0	5.8
2001	Charlotte	10	10	39.7	.480	**.400**	.714	4.4	5.8	2.8*	.5	17.8
2002	Charlotte	9	9	**44.6**	.378	.339	.597	**7.0**	7.9	**3.6***	.6	22.6
2003	New Orleans	5	5	38.8	.446	.343	.727	3.6	**8.4**	1.4	.4	20.4
2004	New Orleans	7	7	37.1	.377	.327	.758	4.1	7.0	1.6	**.7**	18.1
2007	Golden State	**11**	**11**	40.5	**.513**	.373	.770	4.5	6.5	2.9*	.6	**25.3**
2012	New York	4	4	24.3	.478	.286	**1.000**	.8	3.3	.0	.0	7.8
Career		50	46	37.0	.442	.350	.709	4.3	6.2	**2.3**‡	.5	18.8

== Awards and honors ==
NBA

- 2× NBA All-Star (2002, 2004)
- All-NBA Third Team (2004)
- 2× NBA steals leader (2004, 2007)
- NBA Skills Challenge champion (2004)

College

- AP Third-team All-American (1999)
- First-team All-Pac-10 (1999)
- Pac-10 Freshman of the Year (1998)
- Pac-10 All-Freshman Team (1998)
- Great Alaska Shootout All-Tournament Team
- UCLA Athletics Hall of Fame (2016)

High school

- Gatorade Player of the Year (1997)
- McDonald's All-American (1997)
- California Mr. Basketball (1997)

== Broadcasting career ==
From 2017, Davis appeared as a regular panelist during NBA on TNT's Monday coverage called Players Only, which featured only former NBA players as studio analysts, play-by-play announcers, and color analysts for games.

Starting in 2025, Davis will host the Las Vegas Raiders interview series Raiders: Talk of the Nation.

== Career outside of basketball ==
=== Film and television ===
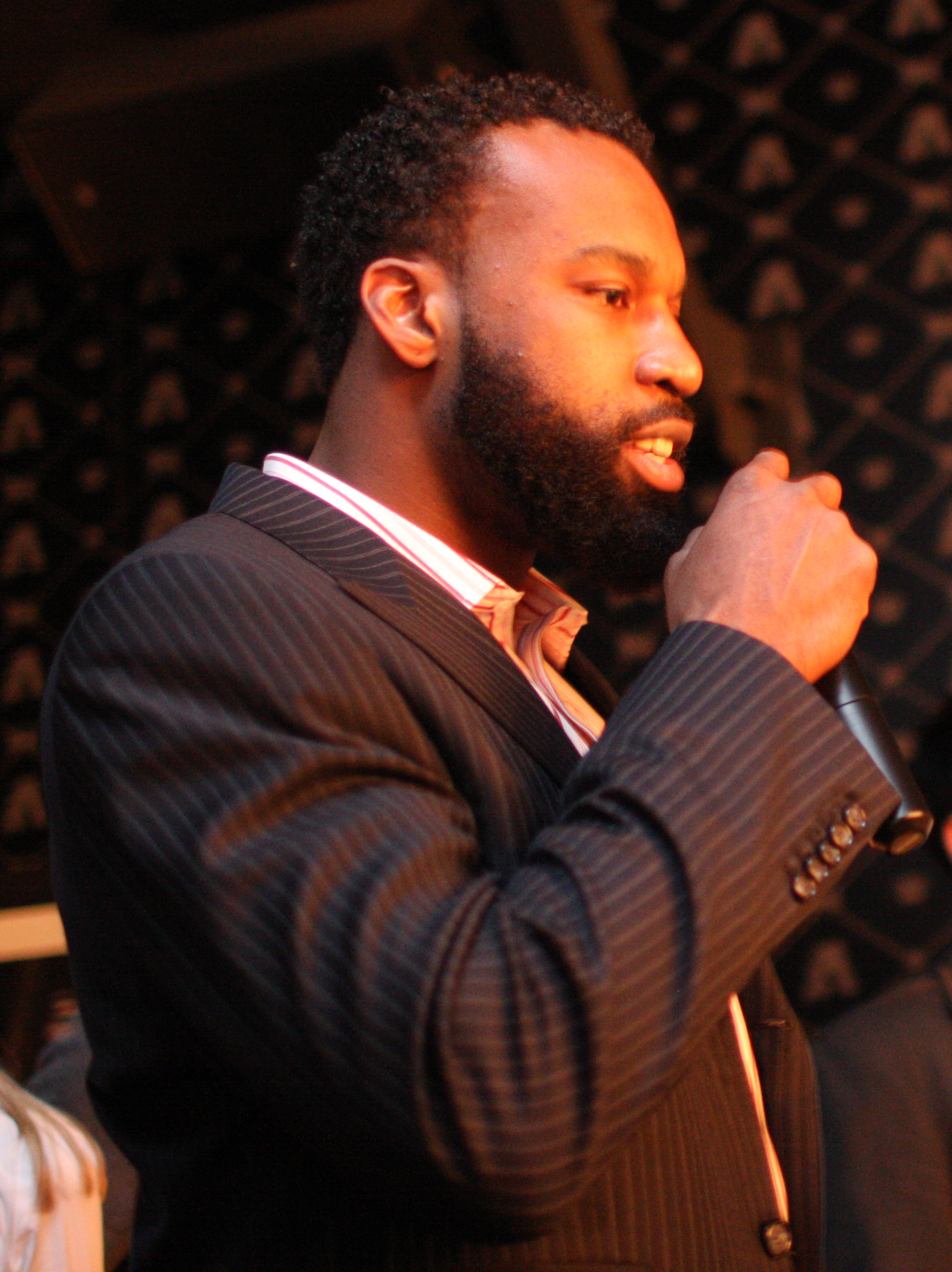
Davis speaking in 2008

In addition to his NBA career, Davis has had an increasing role in the film industry, with the intention of making it a full-time career when his playing days are over. His first appearance as an actor was in a TV commercial for the Charlotte Hornets prior to starting his rookie season https://vimeo.com/71988862. He is a member of the Screen Actors Guild, having earned membership by appearing in movies such as The Cookout and guest-starring on the ABC Family show Lincoln Heights and ABC's The Forgotten. He has made appearances both as himself and fictional characters in movies and on television, and has also been involved in producing a number of films, ranging from The Pool Boys to Crips and Bloods: Made in America. Davis and high school friend, Cash Warren, formed a production company called Verso Entertainment in 2005.

Davis appeared on the DVD commentary track of the 2008 film Step Brothers alongside Will Ferrell and John C. Reilly, and appears as himself during season three of Hot In Cleveland. He appeared in the 2012 film That's My Boy as a gym teacher, and in 2015, he appeared in Yahoo! Screen's Sin City Saints, playing the role of Billy Crane. He also played himself in the 2015 film The Night Before, and portrayed a doctor in Joe Dirt 2.

On November 12, 2015, Davis co-starred alongside Kyrie Irving, Ray Allen and J. B. Smoove as Louis in the fourth episode of "Uncle Drew", a series of Pepsi Max advertisements written and directed by Irving.

In Mozart in the Jungle's last three episodes of the third season, Davis made a special guest appearance as Kevin Majors, an injured NBA player.

Davis appeared in the 2017 Chinese film My Other Home starring Stephon Marbury.

He stars in the scripted television sitcom WTF, Baron Davis on the Fuse channel, premiering January 20, 2019.

In 2019, Davis was able to work with the director Kelly Blatz as an executive producer for the film Senior Love Triangle.

Baron Davis the basketball player should not be confused with Baron Davis the voice actor, who did additional voices in Tarzan II and The Jungle Book 2. However, Davis the basketball player did some voiceover work for the series TripTank, as Stedmund the horse.

In 2023, Davis starred as himself in Joy Ride, appearing as a player in the Chinese Basketball Association.

In 2025, Davis appeared in season 34 of Dancing with the Stars, but was eliminated after the second episode.

In April 2026, Davis made an appearance as a fictionalized version of himself on an episode of Beef.

=== Business ===
In 2012, Davis formed the gaming company 5 Balloons Interactive with Sean O'Brien, formerly of EA Sports, to produce games for the iPhone, iPad, and iPod Touch. Their first game was called "Getting Buckets".

In 2016, Davis created the Black Santa Company to promote African American stories and figures. It also sells shirts, beanies, onesies, as well as Christmas ornaments among other products.

In November 2019, Davis joined an advisory board for Tinley Beverage Company Inc. He invested in Metropolis Technologies in 2021.

== Personal life ==
On January 30, 2014, Davis married former Creative Artists Agency (CAA) agent Isabella Brewster, the sister of actress Jordana Brewster. In April 2014, Brewster announced she and Davis were expecting a child. In January 2016, Brewster gave birth to the couple's second child. The couple split in June 2017. In late 2017, Davis was spotted on several dates with actress Laura Dern.

In July 2026, Davis was sued by his sister over the alleged sale of a house he helped purchase for her nearly two decades ago.

== See also ==
- List of National Basketball Association career assists leaders
- List of National Basketball Association career steals leaders
- List of National Basketball Association annual steals leaders
