= 2000 Detroit Shock season =

- Head coach: Nancy Lieberman-Cline
- Arena: The Palace of Auburn Hills

Results
- Record: 14–18 (.438)
- Place: 5th (Eastern)
- Playoff finish: Did not qualify

The 2000 WNBA season was the third for the Detroit Shock. The Shock were very close of making the playoffs, but they fell to the Washington Mystics in a tiebreaker.

== Transactions ==
=== Miami Sol expansion draft ===
The following player was selected in the Miami Sol expansion draft from the Detroit Shock:

Player	Nationality	School/Team/Country
Lesley Brown	United States	Virginia

=== Indiana Fever expansion draft ===
The following player was selected in the Indiana Fever expansion draft from the Detroit Shock:

Player	Nationality	School/Team/Country
Sandy Brondello	Australia	BTV Wuppertal (Germany)

=== WNBA draft ===
Round	Pick	Player	Nationality	School/Team/Country
1	3	Edwina Brown	United States	Texas
1	8	Tamicha Jackson	United States	Louisiana Tech
2	28	Madinah Slaise	United States	Cincinnati
3	44	Chavonne Hammond	United States	Vanderbilt
4	60	Cal Bouchard	Canada	Boston College

=== Transactions ===
Date	Transaction
December 15, 1999	Lost Lesley Brown to the Miami Sol in the WNBA expansion draft
December 15, 1999	Lost Sandy Brondello to the Indiana Fever in the WNBA expansion draft
April 24, 2000	Traded Jennifer Azzi and a 2000 1st Round Pick to the Utah Starzz in exchange for 2 2000 1st Round Picks
April 25, 2000	Drafted Edwina Brown, Tamicha Jackson, Madinah Slaise, Chavonne Hammond and Cal Bouchard in the 2000 WNBA draft
May 1, 2000	Signed Anna DeForge, Barbara Farris and Elena Tornikidou
May 21, 2000	Waived Chavonne Hammond and Wanda Guyton
July 24, 2000	Waived Madinah Slaise

== Roster ==
2000 Detroit Shock roster
Players
Coaches

Pos.	No.	Nat.	Name	Height	Weight	DOB	From	Yrs
G/F	24	(United States)	Brown, Edwina	5' 9" (1.75m)	163 lb (74kg)	1978-07-01	Texas	R
G	10	(United States)	Canty, Dominique	5' 9" (1.75m)	166 lb (75kg)	1977-03-02	Alabama	1
G	30	(United States)	DeForge, Anna	5' 10" (1.78m)	160 lb (73kg)	1976-04-14	Nebraska	R
F/C	54	(United States)	Farris, Barbara	6' 3" (1.91m)	200 lb (91kg)	1976-09-10	Tulane	R
F	40	(United States)	Holmes Harris, Joy	5' 10" (1.78m)	170 lb (77kg)	1969-03-31	Purdue	R
G	35	(United States)	Jackson, Tamicha	5' 6" (1.68m)	120 lb (54kg)	1978-04-22	Louisiana Tech	R
F	44	(Senegal)	Ndiaye-Diatta, Astou	6' 3" (1.91m)	182 lb (83kg)	1973-11-05	Southern Nazarene	1
F	9	(Brazil)	Neves, Claudia	5' 8" (1.73m)	136 lb (62kg)	1975-02-17		1
F	3	(United States)	Palmer, Wendy	6' 2" (1.88m)	165 lb (75kg)	1974-08-12	Virginia	3
C	0	(United States)	Scott-Richardson, Olympia	6' 2" (1.88m)	175 lb (79kg)	1976-05-05	Stanford	2
G	12	(United States)	Slaise, Madinah	5' 8" (1.73m)		1973-08-23	Cincinnati	R
F	17	(Soviet Union)	Tornikidou, Elena	6' 1" (1.85m)	160 lb (73kg)	1965-05-27		1
C	52	(Soviet Union)	Zakaluzhnaya, Oksana	6' 6" (1.98m)	174 lb (79kg)	1977-12-18		R

Head coach
(United States) Nancy Lieberman-Cline (Old Dominion)
Assistant coaches
(United States) Laura Ramus

Legend

- (C) Team captain
- (DP) Unsigned draft pick
- (FA) Free agent
- (S) Suspended
- Injured

== Schedule ==
=== Regular season ===
2000 game log
Total: 14–18 (Home: 8–9; Road: 6–9)
June: 7–6 (Home: 3–3; Road: 4–3)

Game	Date	Team	Score	High points	High rebounds	High assists	Location Attendance	Record
1	June 3	Sacramento	W 77-74	Elena Tornikidou (18)	Astou Ndiaye-Diatta (12)	Dominique Canty (6)	The Palace of Auburn Hills	1–0
2	June 5	@ Minnesota	L 68-88	Wendy Palmer (15)	Wendy Palmer (6)	Dominique Canty (4)	Target Center	1–1
3	June 7	New York	L 69-73	Dominique Canty (22)	Astou Ndiaye-Diatta (6)	Dominique Canty (4)	The Palace of Auburn Hills	1–2
4	June 9	Indiana	W 80-76	Astou Ndiaye-Diatta (18)	Astou Ndiaye-Diatta (8)	Brown; Canty; Tornikidou (3)	The Palace of Auburn Hills	2–2
5	June 12	Charlotte	L 67-78	Elena Tornikidou (16)	Astou Ndiaye-Diatta (7)	Edwina Brown (3)	The Palace of Auburn Hills	2–3
6	June 13	@ Miami	L 61-74	Jackson; Tornikidou (14)	Oksana Zakaluzhnaya (6)	Claudia Neves (3)	American Airlines Arena	2–4
7	June 16	@ Cleveland	W 93-81	Dominique Canty (22)	Astou Ndiaye-Diatta (8)	Canty; Jackson (7)	Gund Arena	3–4
8	June 18	Indiana	W 111-74	Wendy Palmer (22)	Olympia Scott-Richardson (6)	Tamicha Jackson (5)	The Palace of Auburn Hills	4–4
9	June 19	@ Washington	L 55-80	Tamicha Jackson (13)	Ndiaye-Diatta; Palmer; Scott-Richardson (5)	Tamicha Jackson (3)	MCI Center	4–5
10	June 21	@ New York	W 67-63	Claudia Neves (16)	Wendy Palmer (10)	Neves; Tornikidou (3)	Madison Square Garden	5–5
11	June 24	Washington	L 70-76	Dominique Canty (14)	Wendy Palmer (6)	Canty; Neves; Tornikidou (3)	The Palace of Auburn Hills	5–6
12	June 25	@ Charlotte	W 84-81	Elena Tornikidou (25)	Olympia Scott-Richardson (8)	Jackson; Tornikidou (5)	Charlotte Coliseum	6–6
13	June 28	@ Seattle	W 82-78	Wendy Palmer (32)	Wendy Palmer (12)	Dominique Canty (5)	KeyArena	7–6

July: 5–9 (Home: 4–5; Road: 1–4)

Game	Date	Team	Score	High points	High rebounds	High assists	Location Attendance	Record
14	July 1	@ Sacramento	L 96-108	Wendy Palmer (20)	Wendy Palmer (9)	Elena Tornikidou (6)	ARCO Arena	7–7
15	July 2	@ Los Angeles	L 63-85	Wendy Palmer (12)	Wendy Palmer (9)	Brown; Jackson (3)	Great Western Forum	7–8
16	July 6	@ Phoenix	L 69-83	Claudia Neves (12)	Holmes Harris (7)	Brown; Neves (4)	America West Arena	7–9
17	July 7	@ Utah	W 73-69	Astou Ndiaye-Diatta (18)	Wendy Palmer (12)	Anna DeForge (7)	Delta Center	8–9
18	July 9	Orlando	L 62-68	Wendy Palmer (19)	Wendy Palmer (9)	Anna DeForge (6)	The Palace of Auburn Hills	8–10
19	July 12	Seattle	W 61-56	Dominique Canty (15)	Elena Tornikidou (7)	Elena Tornikidou (4)	The Palace of Auburn Hills	9–10
20	July 14	Miami	W 80-50	Wendy Palmer (15)	Wendy Palmer (9)	Canty; Palmer; Tornikidou (4)	The Palace of Auburn Hills	10–10
21	July 19	Orlando	L 78-88	Claudia Neves (19)	Ndiaye-Diatta; Palmer (6)	Brown; Neves (4)	TD Waterhouse Centre	10–11
22	July 21	Houston	L 74-76 (OT)	Wendy Palmer (22)	Wendy Palmer (12)	Edwina Brown (4)	The Palace of Auburn Hills	10–12
23	July 24	Portland	L 57-61	Elena Tornikidou (12)	Wendy Palmer (10)	Brown; Neves (3)	The Palace of Auburn Hills	10–13
24	July 26	Miami	W 78-62	Wendy Palmer (17)	Barbara Farris (10)	Dominique Canty (4)	The Palace of Auburn Hills	11–13
25	July 28	@ Cleveland	L 60-80	Wendy Palmer (13)	Wendy Palmer (9)	Edwina Brown (8)	Gund Arena	11–14
26	July 29	Charlotte	W 75-72	Wendy Palmer (21)	Astou Ndiaye-Diatta (9)	Elena Tornikidou (4)	The Palace of Auburn Hills	12–14
27	July 31	Cleveland	L 65-76	Wendy Palmer (16)	Astou Ndiaye-Diatta (11)	Dominique Canty (6)	The Palace of Auburn Hills	12–15

August: 2–3 (Home: 1–1; Road: 1–2)

Game	Date	Team	Score	High points	High rebounds	High assists	Location Attendance	Record
28	August 2	Los Angeles	L 81-84	Dominique Canty (17)	Astou Ndiaye-Diatta (12)	Astou Ndiaye-Diatta (4)	The Palace of Auburn Hills	12–16
29	August 4	@ Washington	L 72-96	Astou Ndiaye-Diatta (19)	Ndiaye-Diatta; Scott-Richardson (7)	Dominique Canty (4)	MCI Center	12–17
30	August 6	@ Orlando	L 63-92	Dominique Canty (10)	Canty; Ndiaye-Diatta (6)	Claudia Neves (3)	TD Waterhouse Centre	12–18
31	August 8	@ Indiana	W 74-63	Ndiaye-Diatta; Palmer (18)	Astou Ndiaye-Diatta (8)	Palmer; DeForge (4)	Conseco Fieldhouse	13–18
32	August 9	New York	W 66-63	Astou Ndiaye-Diatta (19)	Astou Ndiaye-Diatta (8)	Dominique Canty (8)	The Palace of Auburn Hills	14–18

=== Season standings ===
Eastern Conference	W	L	PCT	Conf.	GB
New York Liberty ^{x}	20	12	.625	14–7	–
Cleveland Rockers ^{x}	17	15	.531	13–8	3.0
Orlando Miracle ^{x}	16	16	.500	13–8	4.0
Washington Mystics ^{x}	14	18	.438	13–8	6.0
Detroit Shock ^{o}	14	18	.438	10–11	6.0
Miami Sol ^{o}	13	19	.406	9–12	7.0
Indiana Fever ^{o}	9	23	.281	7–14	11.0
Charlotte Sting ^{o}	8	24	.250	5–16	12.0

== Statistics ==
Legend
GP	Games played	GS	Games started	MPG	Minutes per game	RPG	Rebounds per game
APG	Assists per game	SPG	Steals per game	BPG	Blocks per game	PPG	Points per game
FG%	Field-goal percentage	3P%	3-point field-goal percentage	FT%	Free-throw percentage	TO	Turnovers per game
PF	Fouls per game		Team leader		League leader

=== Regular season ===
Player	GP	GS	MPG	FG%	3P%	FT%	RPG	APG	SPG	BPG	PPG
Wendy Palmer	32	30	28.6	.448	.250	.704	6.8	1.2	0.6	0.3	13.8
Dominique Canty	28	27	28.0	.409	.000	.695	2.5	2.9	1.8	0.2	9.2
Elena Tornikidou	32	32	27.2	.506	.125	.914	3.4	2.6	0.9	0.4	10.3
Astou Ndiaye-Diatta	32	32	27.1	.474	.167	.569	5.8	1.3	0.7	0.7	10.8
Claudia Neves	30	20	21.2	.380	.304	.833	1.2	2.0	1.0	0.0	6.0
Edwina Brown	32	7	19.3	.355	.250	.838	2.8	2.3	0.8	0.2	5.9
Anna DeForge	27	10	16.0	.405	.321	.781	1.7	1.7	1.0	0.1	5.4
Tamicha Jackson	17	0	15.7	.387	.250	.743	1.5	2.1	1.3	0.0	6.8
Olympia Scott-Richardson	28	0	13.2	.416	.000	.650	2.9	1.0	0.4	0.4	3.6
Oksana Zakaluzhnaya	23	0	11.2	.521	.429	.909	2.0	0.1	0.2	0.6	3.9
Barbara Farris	14	2	9.3	.500	.000	.556	2.3	0.1	0.4	0.1	3,2
Joy Holmes Harris	29	0	9.3	.471	.364	.700	1.6	0.5	0.4	0.1	3.1
Madinah Slaise	3	0	2.3	.000	.000	1.000	0.3	0.0	0.3	0.0	1.3

^{‡}Waived/Released during the season
^{†}Traded during the season
^{≠}Acquired during the season
