= 2007 NBA Development League expansion draft =

General information
- Sport: Basketball
- Date(s): September 5, 2007

Overview
- League: NBA
- Expansion teams: Rio Grande Valley Vipers; Fort Wayne Mad Ants; Utah Flash; Iowa Energy

The 2007 NBA Development League expansion draft was the second expansion draft of the National Basketball Association Development League (NBADL). The draft was held on September 5, 2007, so that the newly founded Rio Grande Valley Vipers, Fort Wayne Mad Ants, Utah Flash and Iowa Energy could acquire players for the upcoming 2007–08 season. Players from the final 2006–07 rosters of the Arkansas RimRockers and Fort Worth Flyers, as well as all other unprotected NBADL players, were available to have their rights selected in the 2007 expansion draft. A random drawing was held to determine the draft order and the Vipers won the first overall pick. The draft comprised 10 rounds where each team switched their selection order; for example, the Iowa Energy chose last in Round 1 (fourth overall) but were able to select first in Round 2 (fifth overall).

J. R. Pinnock, a guard, was the first overall expansion draft selection. He was one of three players to have also been chosen in an NBA draft (2006) along with James Lang (2003) and Denham Brown (2006). Through the 2009–10 NBA D-League season, eight total players from the 2007 expansion draft have been named an NBA D-League All-Star at least once, including Jeremy Richardson, Will Conroy, Curtis Stinson, Antonio Meeking, Clay Tucker, Desmon Farmer, Walker Russell, Jr. and Luke Schenscher. Oddly, none of the three NBA Draft picks have ever been named NBA D-League All-Stars.

== Key ==
| Pos. | G | F | C |
| Position | Guard | Forward | Center |

| ^ | Denotes player who has been selected to (an) NBA Development League All-Star Game(s) |
| * | Denotes player who has been selected to (an) NBA Development League All-Star Game(s) and was also selected in an NBA draft |
| † | Denotes player who was also selected in an NBA Draft |

== Draft ==
| Round | Pick | Player | Pos. | Nationality | Team | High School/College |
|---|---|---|---|---|---|---|
| 1 | 1 | J. R. Pinnock^{†} | G | United States | Rio Grande Valley Vipers | George Washington |
| 1 | 2 | Jeremy Richardson^{^} | F | United States | Fort Wayne Mad Ants | Delta State |
| 1 | 3 | Brian Jackson | F | United States | Utah Flash | Oregon State |
| 1 | 4 | Will Conroy^{^} | G | United States | Iowa Energy | Washington |
| 2 | 5 | Jackie Manuel | G/F | United States | Iowa Energy | North Carolina |
| 2 | 6 | James Lang^{†} | F | United States | Utah Flash | Central Park Christian HS (Birmingham, AL) |
| 2 | 7 | Anthony Roberson | G | United States | Fort Wayne Mad Ants | Florida |
| 2 | 8 | Trent Strickland | G/F | United States | Rio Grande Valley Vipers | Wake Forest |
| 3 | 9 | Alfred Neale | G/F | United States | Rio Grande Valley Vipers | New Mexico |
| 3 | 10 | Olu Famutimi | G | Canada | Fort Wayne Mad Ants | Arkansas |
| 3 | 11 | Roger Powell | F | United States | Utah Flash | Illinois |
| 3 | 12 | Anthony Terrell | F | United States | Iowa Energy | UNC Wilmington |
| 4 | 13 | Brandon Robinson | F | United States | Iowa Energy | Auburn |
| 4 | 14 | Curtis Stinson^{^} | G | United States | Utah Flash | Iowa State |
| 4 | 15 | Antonio Meeking^{^} | F | United States | Fort Wayne Mad Ants | Louisiana Tech |
| 4 | 16 | Terrance Thomas | F | United States | Rio Grande Valley Vipers | Baylor |
| 5 | 17 | Clay Tucker^{^} | G | United States | Rio Grande Valley Vipers | Milwaukee |
| 5 | 18 | Mike Benton | C | United States | Fort Wayne Mad Ants | College of Charleston |
| 5 | 19 | Kevin Burleson | G | United States | Utah Flash | Minnesota |
| 5 | 20 | Denham Brown^{†} | G/F | Canada | Iowa Energy | Connecticut |
| 6 | 21 | Matt Haryasz | C | United States | Iowa Energy | Stanford |
| 6 | 22 | Chris Copeland | F | United States | Utah Flash | Colorado |
| 6 | 23 | Badou Gaye | C | Senegal | Fort Wayne Mad Ants | Gwynedd–Mercy |
| 6 | 24 | Nigel Dixon | C | United States | Rio Grande Valley Vipers | Western Kentucky |
| 7 | 25 | Desmon Farmer^{^} | G | United States | Rio Grande Valley Vipers | Southern California |
| 7 | 26 | Tyrone Sally | F | United States | Fort Wayne Mad Ants | West Virginia |
| 7 | 27 | Corey Santee | G | United States | Utah Flash | TCU |
| 7 | 28 | Luke Whitehead | F | United States | Iowa Energy | Louisville |
| 8 | 29 | Deji Akindele | C | Nigeria | Iowa Energy | Chicago State |
| 8 | 30 | Cezary Trybański | F/C | Poland | Utah Flash | — |
| 8 | 31 | Chad Bell | C | United States | Fort Wayne Mad Ants | Nevada |
| 8 | 32 | John Gilchrist | G | United States | Rio Grande Valley Vipers | Maryland |
| 9 | 33 | Joe Dabbert | F | United States | Rio Grande Valley Vipers | Creighton |
| 9 | 34 | Walker Russell, Jr.^{^} | G | United States | Fort Wayne Mad Ants | Jacksonville State |
| 9 | 35 | Kevin "Butter" Johnson | G/F | United States | Utah Flash | UNC Charlotte |
| 9 | 36 | DeAnthony Bowden | G | United States | Iowa Energy | Creighton |
| 10 | 37 | Luke Schenscher^{^} | C | Australia | Iowa Energy | Georgia Tech |
| 10 | 38 | Jeff Hagen | C | United States | Utah Flash | Minnesota |
| 10 | 39 | Armien Kirkland | G/F | United States | Fort Wayne Mad Ants | Cincinnati |
| 10 | 40 | Milone Clark | G | United States | Rio Grande Valley Vipers | Tennessee Tech |
