= 2009 NBA Development League expansion draft =

General information
- Sport: Basketball
- Date: September 2, 2009
- Location: New York, New York

Overview
- League: NBA
- Expansion teams: Springfield Armor; Maine Red Claws

The 2009 NBA Development League expansion draft was the fourth expansion draft of the National Basketball Association Development League (NBADL). The draft was held on September 2, 2009, so that the newly founded Springfield Armor and Maine Red Claws could acquire players for the upcoming 2009–10 season. The Armor was created when the Anaheim Arsenal relocated from the West Coast to the East Coast in an effort for the league to establish a greater presence in the east. Springfield was able to retain the rights to many of Anaheim's players, but with the addition of the Maine Red Claws, a need for an expansion draft arose. The Colorado 14ers were also putting the 2009–10 season on hiatus before their eventual move to Frisco, Texas to become the Texas Legends, which evened out the number of teams in the NBADL at 16.

A random drawing determined who was awarded the first pick, which went to the Springfield Armor. The draft took place via teleconference from the NBADL headquarters in New York City. The first overall selection was Marcus Campbell who had played collegiately at Mississippi State. Maine's first choice, the second overall pick, was James White, who had spent most of his collegiate career at Cincinnati. White was also among four players chosen who had also been selected previously in an NBA draft, while he was one of six who had been honored as an NBA D-League All-Star before. The only non-American player selected in the 2009 NBA Development League Expansion Draft was Malick Badiane of Senegal. He had not played at the college level in the United States; rather, he had spent his post-high school years playing professionally in different countries before embarking on his D-League career.

== Key ==
Pos.	G	F	C
Position	Guard	Forward	Center

^	Denotes player who has been selected to (an) NBA Development League All-Star Game(s)
*	Denotes player who has been selected to (an) NBA Development League All-Star Game(s) and was also selected in an NBA draft
†	Denotes player who was also selected in an NBA Draft

== Draft ==
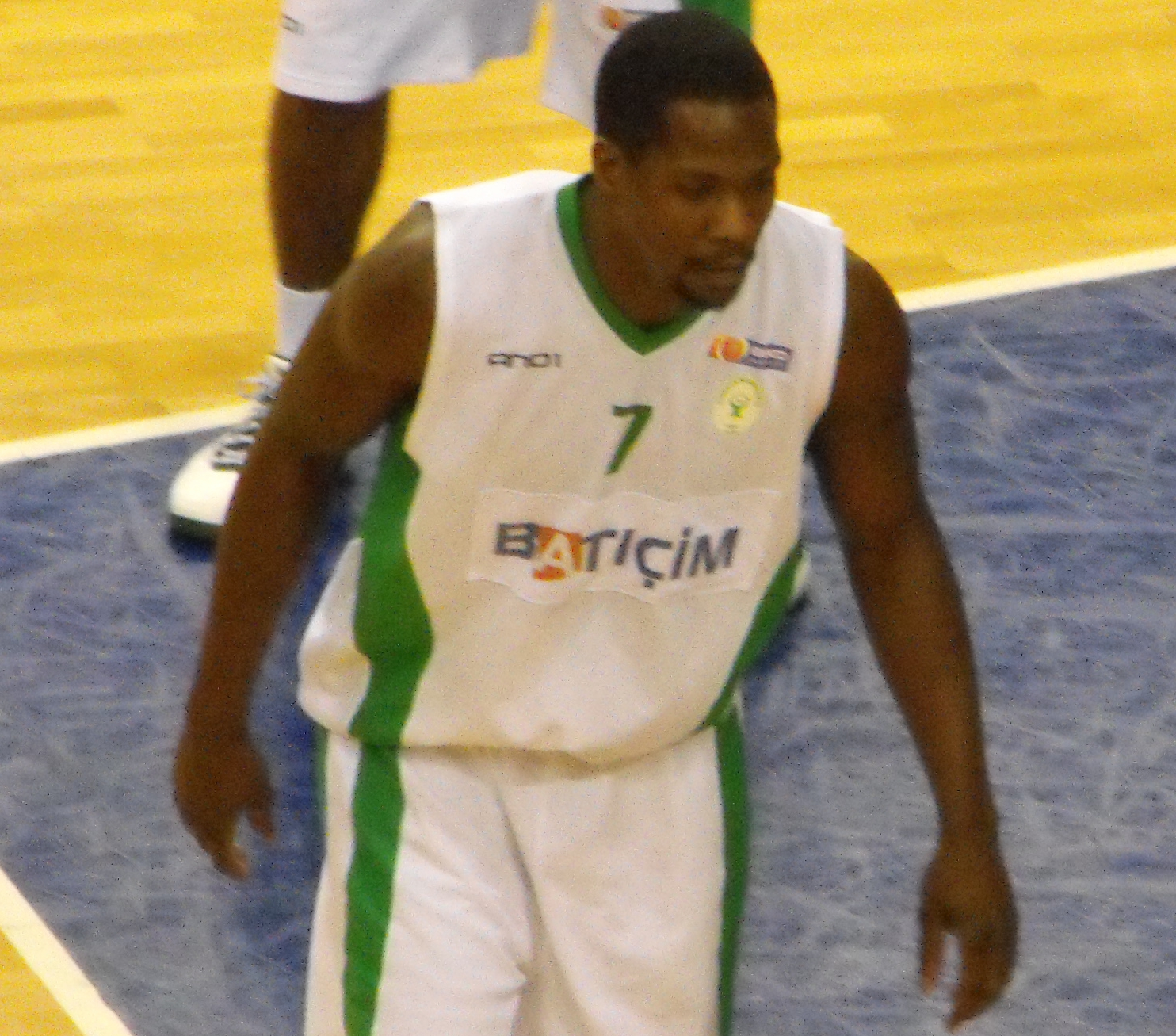
Kedrick Brown was selected 12th overall by the Springfield Armor.

Round	Pick	Player	Pos.	Nationality	Team	College
1	1	Marcus Campbell	C	United States	Springfield Armor	Mississippi State
1	2	James White*	G/F	United States	Maine Red Claws	Cincinnati
2	3	James Mays	F	United States	Maine Red Claws	Clemson
2	4	Trey Gilder^{^}	F	United States	Springfield Armor	Northwestern State
3	5	Eddie Gill^{^}	G	United States	Springfield Armor	Weber State
3	6	Billy Thomas^{^}	G	United States	Maine Red Claws	Kansas
4	7	Kentrell Gransberry	C	United States	Maine Red Claws	South Florida
4	8	Noel Felix	F	United States	Springfield Armor	Fresno State
5	9	Cedric Bozeman^{^}	G/F	United States	Springfield Armor	UCLA
5	10	John Lucas III	G	United States	Maine Red Claws	Oklahoma State
6	11	Jamar Brown	F	United States	Maine Red Claws	Colorado State–Pueblo
6	12	Kedrick Brown^{†}	G/F	United States	Springfield Armor	Okaloosa-Walton CC (Niceville, FL)
7	13	Malick Badiane^{†}	F/C	Senegal	Springfield Armor	—
7	14	Dominique Coleman	G	United States	Maine Red Claws	Colorado
8	15	Marcus Taylor^{†}	G	United States	Maine Red Claws	Michigan State
8	16	Joe Dabbert	F/C	United States	Springfield Armor	Creighton
9	17	Cameron Bennerman	G	United States	Springfield Armor	North Carolina State
9	18	Josh Davis^{^}	F	United States	Maine Red Claws	Wyoming
10	19	Kirk Walters	C	United States	Maine Red Claws	Arizona
10	20	Andre Patterson	F	United States	Springfield Armor	Tennessee
