= Astou =

Astou is a Senegalese feminine given name. Notable people with the name include:

- Astou Ndiaye-Diatta (born 1973), Senegalese basketball player
- Astou Ndour, Spanish-Senegalese basketball player
- Astou Traoré (born 1981), Senegalese basketball player
