= 2001 Detroit Shock season =

- Head coach: Greg Williams
- Arena: The Palace of Auburn Hills

Results
- Record: 10–22 (.313)
- Place: 7th (Eastern)
- Playoff finish: Did not qualify

Media
- Television: WJBK (FOX 2); Fox Sports Net Detroit

The 2001 WNBA season was the fourth season for the Detroit Shock.

== Transactions ==
=== WNBA draft ===
Round	Pick	Player	Nationality	School/Team/Country
1	6	Deanna Nolan	United States	Georgia
2	22	Jae Kingi	New Zealand	Adelaide Lightning (Australia)
3	38	Svetlana Volnaya	Soviet Union	Virginia
4	54	Kelly Santos	Brazil	Brazil

=== Transactions ===
Date	Transaction
August 28, 2000	Fired Nancy Lieberman-Cline as Head Coach
September 20, 2000	Hired Greg Williams as Head Coach
April 20, 2001	Traded Val Whiting-Raymond to the Minnesota Lynx in exchange for a 2002 2nd Round Pick
April 20, 2001	Drafted Deanna Nolan, Jae Kingi, Svetlana Volnaya and Kelly Santos in the 2001 WNBA draft
April 23, 2001	Traded Anna DeForge to the Houston Comets in exchange for Jennifer Rizzotti
May 12, 2001	Traded Tamicha Jackson and a 2002 4th Round Pick to the Portland Fire in exchange for a 2002 2nd Round Pick
May 18, 2001	Waived Cal Bouchard and Svetlana Volnaya
May 27, 2001	Traded Jennifer Rizzotti to the Cleveland Rockers in exchange for a 2002 3rd Round Pick
May 27, 2001	Traded Olympia Scott-Richardson and a 2002 3rd Round Pick to the Indiana Fever in exchange for 2002 2nd Round Pick
May 27, 2001	Waived Joy Holmes Harris

== Roster ==
2001 Detroit Shock roster
Players
Coaches

Pos.	No.	Nat.	Name	Height	Weight	DOB	From	Yrs
F	11	(Australia)	Boyd, Carla	6' 1" (1.85m)	172 lb (78kg)	1975-10-31		2
G/F	24	(United States)	Brown, Edwina	5' 9" (1.75m)	163 lb (74kg)	1978-07-01	Texas	1
G	10	(United States)	Canty, Dominique	5' 9" (1.75m)	166 lb (75kg)	1977-03-02	Alabama	3
F/C	54	(United States)	Farris, Barbara	6' 3" (1.91m)	200 lb (91kg)	1976-09-10	Tulane	1
G	6	(New Zealand)	Kingi, Jae	5' 8" (1.73m)	150 lb (68kg)	1976-01-20		R
F	44	(Senegal)	Ndiaye-Diatta, Astou	6' 3" (1.91m)	182 lb (83kg)	1973-11-05	Southern Nazarene	2
F	9	(Brazil)	Neves, Claudia	5' 8" (1.73m)	136 lb (62kg)	1975-02-17		2
G/F	14	(United States)	Nolan, Deanna	5' 9" (1.75m)	147 lb (67kg)	1979-08-25	Georgia	R
F	3	(United States)	Palmer, Wendy	6' 2" (1.88m)	165 lb (75kg)	1974-08-12	Virginia	4
F	16	(Brazil)	Santos, Kelly	6' 3" (1.91m)	188 lb (85kg)	1979-11-10		R
F	4	(Australia)	Sporn, Rachael	6' 1" (1.85m)	175 lb (79kg)	1968-05-26		2
F	17	(Soviet Union)	Tornikidou, Elena	6' 1" (1.85m)	160 lb (73kg)	1965-05-27		2

Head coach
(United States) Greg Williams (Rice)
Assistant coaches
(United States) Laura Ramus

Legend

- (C) Team captain
- (DP) Unsigned draft pick
- (FA) Free agent
- (S) Suspended
- Injured

== Schedule ==
=== Regular season ===
2001 game log
Total: 10–22 (Home: 5–11; Road: 5–11)
June: 4–8 (Home: 2–5; Road: 2–3)

Game	Date	Team	Score	High points	High rebounds	High assists	Location Attendance	Record
1	June 2	Houston	L 73–74	Astou Ndiaye-Diatta (24)	Ndiaye-Diatta; Palmer (6)	Elena Tornikidou (5)	The Palace of Auburn Hills	0–1
2	June 5	Orlando	L 71–92	Deanna Nolan (12)	Astou Ndiaye-Diatta (9)	Edwina Brown (5)	The Palace of Auburn Hills	0–2
3	June 7	@ Houston	L 66–87	Elena Tornikidou (15)	Wendy Palmer (9)	Astou Ndiaye-Diatta (4)	Compaq Center	0–3
4	June 12	@ Miami	W 68–67 (OT)	Canty; Palmer (16)	Wendy Palmer (9)	Edwina Brown (4)	American Airlines Arena	1–3
5	June 14	Washington	W 80–65	Astou Ndiaye-Diatta (22)	Ndiaye-Diatta; Palmer (9)	Astou Ndiaye-Diatta (4)	The Palace of Auburn Hills	2–3
6	June 16	@ Charlotte	W 72–69 (2OT)	Dominique Canty (20)	Barbara Farris (8)	Dominique Canty (7)	Charlotte Coliseum	3–3
7	June 17	Minnesota	L 63–71	Carla Boyd (14)	Astou Ndiaye-Diatta (12)	Canty; Brown (3)	The Palace of Auburn Hills	3–4
8	June 22	@ Indiana	L 56–77	Dominique Canty (10)	Astou Ndiaye-Diatta (6)	Jae Kingi (5)	Conseco Fieldhouse	3–5
9	June 23	Indiana	L 70–74	Claudia Neves (16)	Santos; Sporn (5)	Dominique Canty (6)	The Palace of Auburn Hills	3–6
10	June 26	Los Angeles	L 89–98	Edwina Brown (18)	Farris; Ndiaye-Diatta (8)	Edwina Brown (5)	The Palace of Auburn Hills	3–7
11	June 27	@ Charlotte	L 50–74	Astou Ndiaye-Diatta (13)	Barbara Farris (6)	Dominique Canty (3)	Charlotte Coliseum	3–8
12	June 29	Phoenix	W 75–71	Jae Kingi (25)	Dominique Canty (11)	Jae Kingi (4)	The Palace of Auburn Hills	4–8

July : 3–10 (Home: 1–4; Road: 2–6)

Game	Date	Team	Score	High points	High rebounds	High assists	Location Attendance	Record
13	July 2	@ New York	L 60–66	Elena Tornikidou (16)	Jae Kingi (8)	Dominique Canty (4)	Madison Square Garden	4–9
14	July 6	Charlotte	L 50–67	Deanna Nolan (11)	Astou Ndiaye-Diatta (9)	Farris; Kingi; Ndiaye-Diatta (2)	The Palace of Auburn Hills	4–10
15	July 8	@ Orlando	L 67–73	Edwina Brown (15)	Elena Tornikidou (7)	Dominique Canty (3)	TD Waterhouse Centre	4–11
16	July 11	@ Washington	W 64–52	Astou Ndiaye-Diatta (20)	Astou Ndiaye-Diatta (10)	Ndiaye-Diatta; Neves (5)	MCI Center	5–11
17	July 13	Miami	L 55–56	Astou Ndiaye-Diatta (19)	Wendy Palmer (8)	Jae Kingi (6)	The Palace of Auburn Hills	5–12
18	July 14	@ Miami	L 51–66	Deanna Nolan (10)	Wendy Palmer (8)	Canty; Ndiaye-Diatta; Palmer (2)	American Airlines Arena	5–13
19	July 18	New York	L 67–80	Astou Ndiaye-Diatta (19)	Wendy Palmer (8)	Brown; Neves; Tornikidou (2)	The Palace of Auburn Hills	5–14
20	July 21	@ Sacramento	L 52–66	Ndiaye-Diatta; Kingi (13)	Edwina Brown (9)	Edwina Brown (5)	ARCO Arena	5–15
21	July 22	@ Portland	W 80–77 (OT)	Astou Ndiaye-Diatta (18)	Wendy Palmer (7)	Canty; Tornikidou (4)	Rose Garden	6–15
22	July 24	@ Seattle	L 69–74 (OT)	Astou Ndiaye-Diatta (23)	Wendy Palmer (11)	Elena Tornikidou (6)	KeyArena	6–16
23	July 26	@ Phoenix	L 62–63	Astou Ndiaye-Diatta (23)	Astou Ndiaye-Diatta (7)	Edwina Brown (6)	America West Arena	6–17
24	July 28	Cleveland	L 50–57	Wendy Palmer (14)	Astou Ndiaye-Diatta (8)	Jae Kingi (4)	The Palace of Auburn Hills	6–18
25	July 29	Orlando	W 64–62	Edwina Brown (13)	Edwina Brown (6)	Edwina Brown (5)	The Palace of Auburn Hills	7–18

August : 3–4 (Home: 3–1; Road: 0–3)

Game	Date	Team	Score	High points	High rebounds	High assists	Location Attendance	Record
26	August 1	@ New York	L 63–66	Elena Tornikidou (22)	Wendy Palmer (11)	Edwina Brown (5)	Madison Square Garden	7–19
27	August 4	Portland	W 70–65	Edwina Brown (15)	Wendy Palmer (13)	Jae Kingi (4)	The Palace of Auburn Hills	8–19
28	August 7	Utah	L 69–76	Astou Ndiaye-Diatta (27)	Farris; Ndiaye-Diatta (3)	Edwina Brown (6)	The Palace of Auburn Hills	8–20
29	August 8	@ Cleveland	L 66–73	Astou Ndiaye-Diatta (19)	Edwina Brown (5)	Edwina Brown (7)	Gund Arena	8–21
30	August 10	Washington	W 69–63	Elena Tornikidou (21)	Wendy Palmer (8)	Jae Kingi (5)	The Palace of Auburn Hills	9–21
31	August 12	@ Indiana	L 66–83	Wendy Palmer (17)	Wendy Palmer (6)	Edwina Brown (4)	Conseco Fieldhouse	9–22
32	August 14	Cleveland	W 76–65	Elena Tornikidou (16)	Wendy Palmer (5)	Edwina Brown (7)	The Palace of Auburn Hills	10–22

2001 season schedule

=== Season standings ===
Eastern Conference	W	L	PCT	Conf.	GB
Cleveland Rockers ^{x}	22	10	.688	15–6	–
New York Liberty ^{x}	21	11	.656	13–8	1.0
Miami Sol ^{x}	20	12	.625	14–7	2.0
Charlotte Sting ^{x}	18	14	.563	15–6	4.0
Orlando Miracle ^{o}	13	19	.406	9–12	9.0
Indiana Fever ^{o}	10	22	.313	7–14	12.0
Detroit Shock ^{o}	10	22	.313	7–14	12.0
Washington Mystics ^{o}	10	22	.313	4–17	12.0

== Statistics ==
Legend
GP	Games played	GS	Games started	MPG	Minutes per game	RPG	Rebounds per game
APG	Assists per game	SPG	Steals per game	BPG	Blocks per game	PPG	Points per game
FG%	Field-goal percentage	3P%	3-point field-goal percentage	FT%	Free-throw percentage	TO	Turnovers per game
PF	Fouls per game		Team leader		League leader

=== Regular season ===
Player	GP	GS	MPG	FG%	3P%	FT%	RPG	APG	SPG	BPG	PPG
Wendy Palmer	22	22	29.6	.423	.333	.678	7.0	1.0	1.0	0.2	10.6
Astou Ndiaye-Diatta	32	31	28.5	.457	.333	.776	5.3	1.5	0.7	0.9	11.8
Edwina Brown	32	14	25.0	.366	.377	.783	3.2	2.7	1.0	0.2	7.4
Elena Tornikidou	32	32	24.3	.446	.449	.887	2.4	1.8	0.6	0.4	9.6
Jae Kingi	29	17	21.6	.387	.375	.722	2.2	2.6	1.1	0.3	5.8
Deanna Nolan	27	0	20.2	.330	.288	.811	2.0	1.1	0.6	0.2	7.1
Dominique Canty	32	18	19.5	.363	.200	.757	2.6	2.2	1.0	0.0	6.2
Claudia Neves	22	15	18.5	.362	.365	1.000	1.3	1.5	1.0	0.0	4.3
Barbara Farris	31	10	18.0	.469	N/A	.638	3.5	0.5	0.2	0.2	4.2
Rachael Sporn	23	1	11.5	.404	N/A	.333	2.3	0.5	0.3	0.2	1.8
Carla Boyd	21	0	11.0	.343	.306	.900	1.2	0.7	0.5	0.1	3.6
Kelly Santos	14	0	10.9	.476	.000	.667	1.9	0.4	0.2	0.2	3.7

^{‡}Waived/Released during the season
^{†}Traded during the season
^{≠}Acquired during the season
