= 2006 NBA Development League expansion draft =

General information
- Sport: Basketball
- Date(s): September 19, 2006
- Location: Greenville, South Carolina
- Network(s): NBA TV

Overview
- League: NBA
- Expansion teams: Colorado 14ers Bakersfield Jam; Anaheim Arsenal; Los Angeles D-Fenders

The 2006 NBA Development League expansion draft was the first expansion draft of the National Basketball Association Development League (NBADL). The draft was held on September 19, 2006, so that the newly founded Colorado 14ers, Bakersfield Jam, Anaheim Arsenal and Los Angeles D-Fenders could acquire players for the upcoming 2006–07 season. An independent agency conducted a random drawing to determine the selection order. Colorado was awarded the first overall pick, followed by Bakersfield, Anaheim and Los Angeles. The expansion draft was conducted via conference call from the NBA Development League's main office, and it drew from a pool comprising 44 players who had played in the D-League the season before but who were not currently on D-League rosters. Regarding the inaugural expansion draft, Senior Director of Basketball Operations and Player Personnel Chris Alpert said, "The Expansion Draft is an effort to give new teams an equal footing in regard to rights to returning players. The league will sign up to four players from season-ending rosters of returning teams, so this levels the playing field somewhat heading into the regular Draft."

Elton Brown, a forward from Virginia, was the number one overall selection. He is among six players taken in the expansion draft who became NBA Development League All-Stars. The five others include Andre Barrett, Jawad Williams, Rick Rickert, Brian Chase and Kaniel Dickens. Four players had also been selected in an NBA draft: Tremaine Fowlkes (1998), Mateen Cleaves (2000), Dickens (2000) and Rickert (2003). In the 40 selections, two of the players were non-American. Hiram Fuller is Libyan, while Sung-Yoon Bang is South Korean.

== Key ==
Pos.	G	F	C
Position	Guard	Forward	Center

^	Denotes player who has been selected to (an) NBA Development League All-Star Game(s)
*	Denotes player who has been selected to (an) NBA Development League All-Star Game(s) and was also selected in an NBA draft
†	Denotes player who was also selected in an NBA Draft

== Draft ==
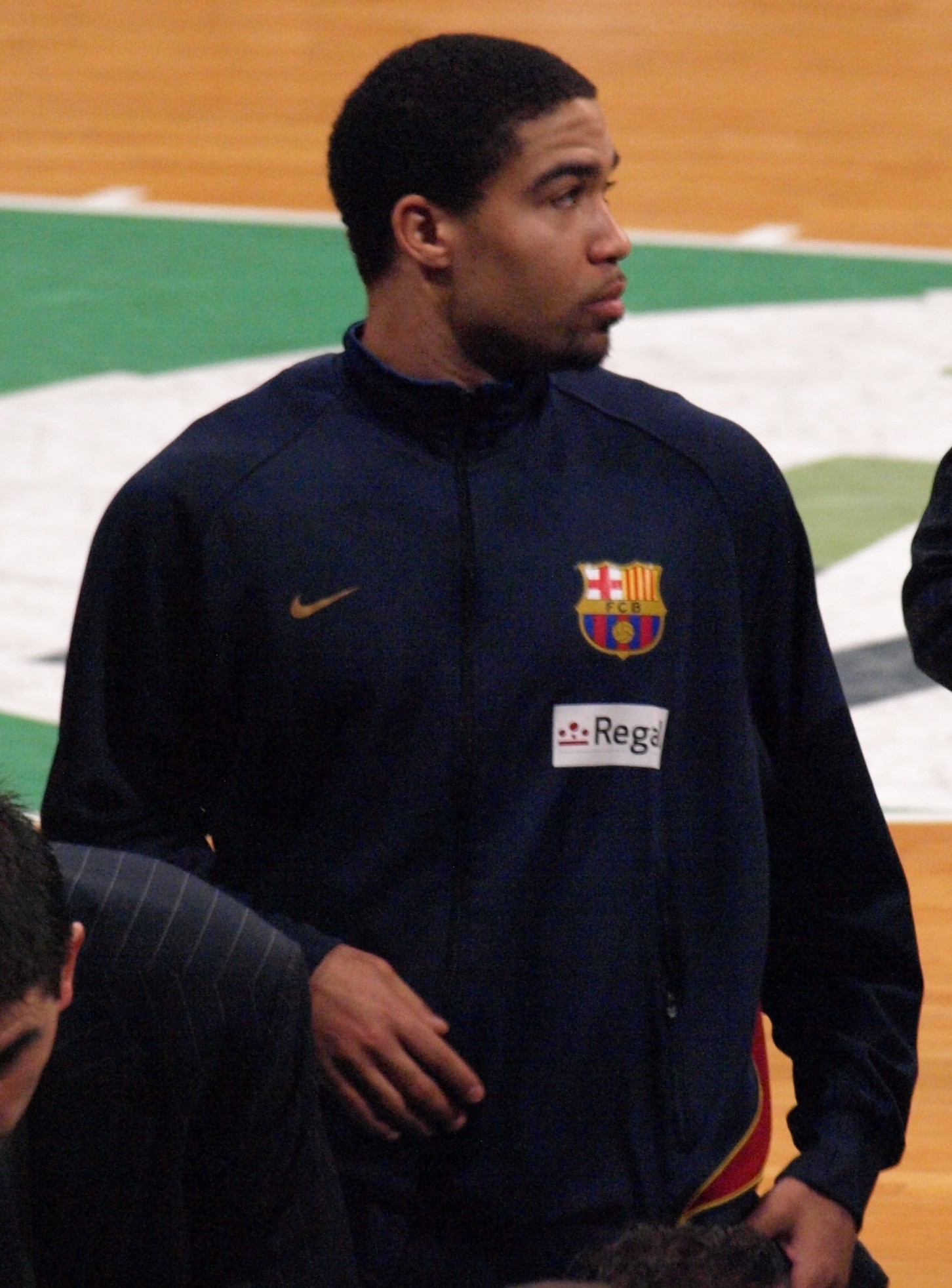
Andre Barrett was selected second overall to the Bakersfield Jam.

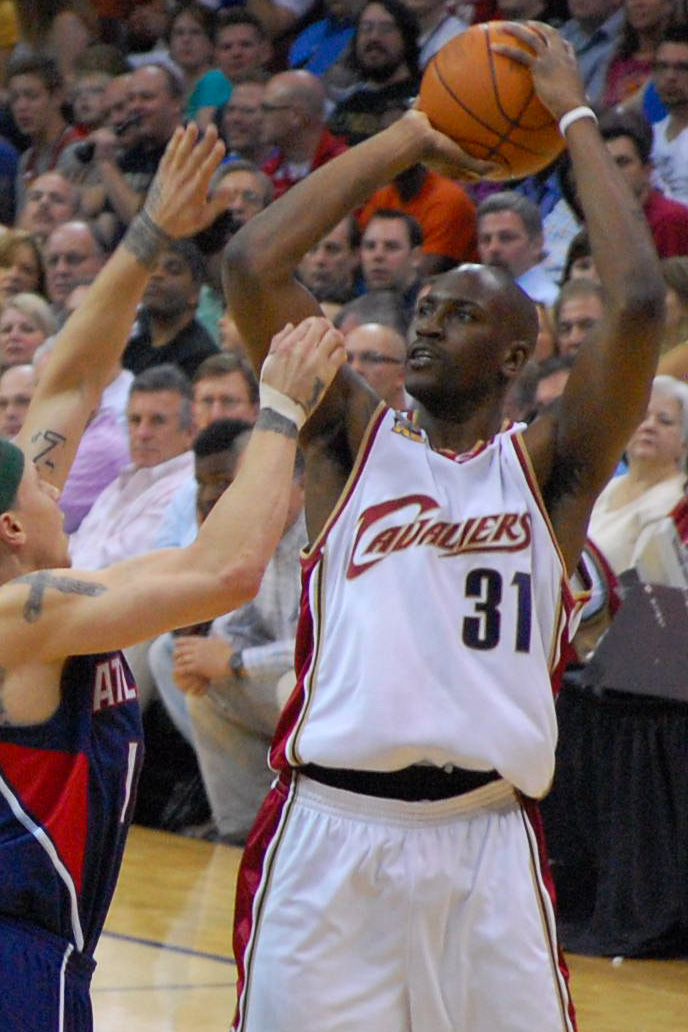
Jawad Williams was the Anaheim Arsenal's first pick.

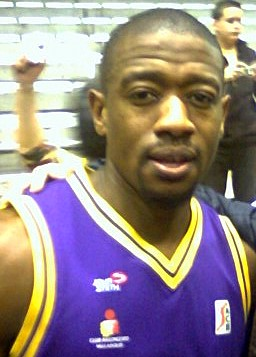
Brian Chase was selected as an NBADL All-Star in 2006–07.

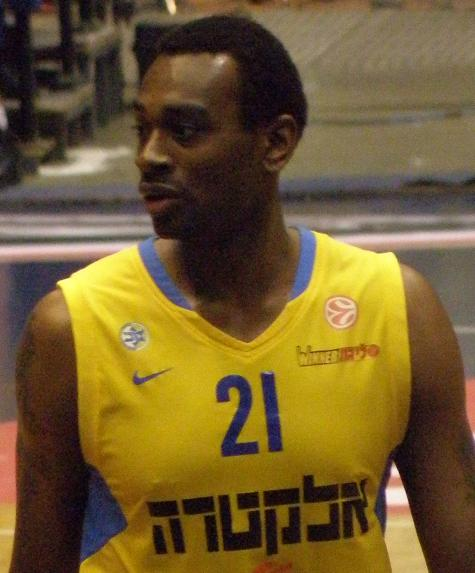
D'or Fischer was picked 21st overall by the Colorado 14ers.

Round	Pick	Player	Pos.	Nationality	Team	College
1	1	Elton Brown^{^}	F	United States	Colorado 14ers	Virginia
1	2	Andre Barrett^{^}	G	United States	Bakersfield Jam	Seton Hall
1	3	Jawad Williams^{^}	F	United States	Anaheim Arsenal	North Carolina
1	4	Duane Erwin	F	United States	Los Angeles D-Fenders	Memphis
2	5	Lenny Stokes	G/F	United States	Colorado 14ers	Cincinnati
2	6	Melvin Sanders	G/F	United States	Bakersfield Jam	Oklahoma State
2	7	George Leach	C	United States	Anaheim Arsenal	Indiana
2	8	Hiram Fuller	F	Libya	Los Angeles D-Fenders	Fresno State
3	9	Rick Rickert*	F/C	United States	Colorado 14ers	Minnesota
3	10	Robb Dryden	C	United States	Bakersfield Jam	Georgia
3	11	Ryan Randle	F/C	United States	Anaheim Arsenal	Maryland
3	12	Brian Chase^{^}	G	United States	Los Angeles D-Fenders	Virginia Tech
4	13	Kaniel Dickens*	F	United States	Colorado 14ers	Idaho
4	14	Rod Riley	C	United States	Bakersfield Jam	Prairie View A&M
4	15	Bryant Matthews	G/F	United States	Anaheim Arsenal	Virginia Tech
4	16	Kevin "Butter" Johnson	F	United States	Los Angeles D-Fenders	UNC Charlotte
5	17	Austin Nichols	G/F	United States	Colorado 14ers	Humboldt State
5	18	Theron Smith	F	United States	Bakersfield Jam	Ball State
5	19	Sung-Yoon Bang	G	South Korea	Anaheim Arsenal	Yonsei University (Seoul, South Korea)
5	20	Josh Gross	F	United States	Los Angeles D-Fenders	UNC Greensboro
6	21	D'or Fischer	F/C	United States	Colorado 14ers	West Virginia
6	22	Sharrod Ford	F	United States	Bakersfield Jam	Clemson
6	23	T. J. Sorrentine	G	United States	Anaheim Arsenal	Vermont
6	24	Jackie Manuel	G	United States	Los Angeles D-Fenders	North Carolina
7	25	Tyrone Sally	F	United States	Colorado 14ers	West Virginia
7	26	Anthony Grundy	G	United States	Bakersfield Jam	North Carolina State
7	27	Seth Doliboa	F	United States	Anaheim Arsenal	Wright State
7	28	Erik Daniels	F	United States	Los Angeles D-Fenders	Kentucky
8	29	Kevin Lyde	F/C	United States	Colorado 14ers	Temple
8	30	Will Bynum	G	United States	Bakersfield Jam	Georgia Tech
8	31	Jason Clark	G	United States	Anaheim Arsenal	Lynn
8	32	Isiah Victor	F	United States	Los Angeles D-Fenders	Tennessee
9	33	E. J. Rowland	G	United States	Colorado 14ers	Saint Mary's (CA)
9	34	Mateen Cleaves^{†}	G	United States	Bakersfield Jam	Michigan State
9	35	Justin Johnson	G	United States	Anaheim Arsenal	Mississippi
9	36	Reed Rawlings	F	United States	Los Angeles D-Fenders	Samford
10	37	Jonathan Moore	F	United States	Colorado 14ers	North Carolina Central
10	38	Darnell Miller	G/F	United States	Bakersfield Jam	West Georgia Tech
10	39	Kevin Owens	C	United States	Anaheim Arsenal	Monmouth
10	40	Tremaine Fowlkes^{†}	F	United States	Los Angeles D-Fenders	Fresno State

All information summarised in this table comes from the NBA draft announcement or from a summary of those results.
