= 2013 NBA Development League expansion draft =

General information
- Sport: Basketball
- Date: August 29, 2013
- Location: New York, New York

Overview
- League: NBA
- Expansion teams: Delaware 87ers

The 2013 NBA Development League expansion draft was the sixth expansion draft of the National Basketball Association Development League (D-League). The draft was held on August 29, 2013, so that the newly founded Delaware 87ers could acquire players for the upcoming 2013–14 season. The 16 players were chosen from a pool of unprotected players among the league's teams. Each returning D-League team could protect up to 12 of their players from being selected.

Two of the players that the 87ers chose had previously been named NBA D-League All-Stars: Leo Lyons and Sean Williams. A Boston College alumnus, Williams was also one of two players taken who had previously been selected in an NBA draft (Darington Hobson was the other).

== Key ==
Pos.	G	F	C
Position	Guard	Forward	Center

^	Denotes player who has been selected to (an) NBA Development League All-Star Game(s)
*	Denotes player who has been selected to (an) NBA Development League All-Star Game(s) and was also selected in an NBA draft
†	Denotes player who was also selected in an NBA Draft

== Draft ==
Pick	Player	Pos.	Nationality	Team	College
1	Josh Akognon	G	Nigeria; United States	Delaware 87ers	Cal State Fullerton
2	Chris Cooper	C	United States	Delaware 87ers	Old Dominion
3	Jerome Dyson	G	United States	Delaware 87ers	Connecticut
4	Frank Hassell	F	United States	Delaware 87ers	Old Dominion
5	Darington Hobson^{†}	F	United States	Delaware 87ers	New Mexico
6	Kyle Fogg	G	United States	Delaware 87ers	Arizona
7	Jeremy Green	G	United States	Delaware 87ers	Stanford
8	Leo Lyons^	F	United States	Delaware 87ers	Missouri
9	Ramone Moore	G	United States	Delaware 87ers	Temple
10	Hamady N'Diaye	C	Senegal	Delaware 87ers	Rutgers
11	Reeves Nelson	F	United States	Delaware 87ers	UCLA
12	Jerome Randle	G	United States	Delaware 87ers	California
13	Ish Smith	G	United States	Delaware 87ers	Wake Forest
14	Willie Warren^{†}	G/F	United States	Delaware 87ers	Oklahoma
15	Tyler Wilkerson	F/C	United States	Delaware 87ers	Marshall
16	Sean Williams*	C	United States	Delaware 87ers	Boston College
