= Jae Kingi-Cross =

Australian basketball player (born 1976)

Personal information
- Born: 20 January 1976 (age 50) Wellington, New Zealand

Career history
- 2001, 2004: Detroit Shock
- 2004: Phoenix Mercury
- 2006: San Antonio Silver Stars
- Stats at Basketball Reference
Medals
Women's Basketball
Representing Australia
World Championships
Bronze medal – third place	2002 China	Team competition
Commonwealth Games
Gold medal – first place	2006 Melbourne	Team competition

Jae Monique Kingi-Cross (née Kingi; 20 January 1976) is a New Zealand-born Australian former basketball player and coach. She played for the Detroit Shock, Houston Comets, Phoenix Mercury, and San Antonio Silver Stars of the Women's National Basketball Association (WNBA). Kingi-Cross was the first player of Māori descent to be selected in the WNBA draft.

== Professional career ==
In the domestic Women's National Basketball League (WNBL), Kingi-Cross played 192 games for the Australian Institute of Sport and the Adelaide Lightning. Kingi-Cross was also twice named to the WNBL All-Star Five, in seasons 2000/01 and 2001/02.

In 2001, Kingi-Cross moved to the United States to play in the Women's National Basketball Association where she was selected in the second round (pick 22 overall) of the 2001 WNBA draft by the Detroit Shock. Kingi-Cross also played with the Phoenix Mercury (2004), the San Antonio Silver Stars (2006) and the Houston Comets (2007). Entering the 2006 World Championship held in Brazil, Kingi-Cross was the only Australian playing in the WNBA who was not selected in the Opals team.

== National team career ==
Kingi-Cross was a member of the Australia women's national basketball team for 12 years, from 1995-2006 and was in the squad that won a bronze medal at the 2002 World Championships held in China. Pregnancy kept Kingi-Cross out of the 2004 Olympic squad that went to Athens.

== Coaching career ==
Kingi-Cross spent five seasons as an assistant coach and two seasons as associate head coach with the Rice Owls women's basketball team. She served as head coach of the St. Thomas Celts women's basketball team from 2015-2023.

== Career statistics ==
Legend
GP	Games played	GS	Games started	MPG	Minutes per game	RPG	Rebounds per game
APG	Assists per game	SPG	Steals per game	BPG	Blocks per game	PPG	Points per game
TO	Turnovers per game	FG%	Field-goal percentage	3P%	3-point field-goal percentage	FT%	Free-throw percentage
**Bold**	Career best	°	League leader

=== WNBA ===
WNBA regular season statistics
Year	Team	GP	GS	MPG	FG%	3P%	FT%	RPG	APG	SPG	BPG	TO	PPG
2001	Detroit	**29**	**17**	**21.6**	.387	.375	.722	**2.2**	**2.6**	**1.1**	**0.3**	1.8	**5.8**
2002	Did not appear in league												
2003	Did not play (maternity leave)												
2004	Detroit	5	0	3.0	—	—	.750	0.2	0.2	0.0	0.0	0.4	0.6
2004	Phoenix	13	0	9.8	.333	**.429**	.714	1.0	0.9	0.4	0.2	0.5	1.5
2005	Did not play (waived)												
2006	San Antonio	18	1	6.4	**.444**	.333	**.778**	0.6	0.6	0.3	0.0	**0.3**	1.4
**Career**	3 years, 3 teams	65	18	13.6	.388	.376	.732	1.3	1.5	0.6	0.2	1.0	3.3

== Personal life ==
In 2008, she was inducted into her home town of Canberra's Sports Hall of Fame. Kingi-Cross and her husband, Tom Cross, live in Texas with their four daughters.

== See also ==
- List of Australian WNBA players
