= 2006 WNBA expansion draft =

4th WNBA expansion draft

General information
- Sport: Basketball
- Date: November 16, 2005

Overview
- League: WNBA
- Expansion team: Chicago Sky

The Women's National Basketball Association (WNBA) held their fourth expansion draft on November 16, 2005, for the Chicago Sky. This draft allowed the Chicago Sky to select players from the existing WNBA teams to fill their debut roster prior to the start of the 2006 WNBA season.

On November 1, 2005, the existing WNBA teams submitted a list of six protected players from their 2005 rosters. On November 15, the Sky reviewed these lists and then selected one player from each of the other 13 teams. The results of this draft were then publicized the next day.

== Key ==
| Pos. | G | F | C |
| Position | Guard | Forward | Center |

| ! | Denotes player who has been inducted to the Naismith Basketball Hall of Fame |
| ^ | Denotes player who has been inducted to the Women's Basketball Hall of Fame |
| ^{+} | Denotes player who has been selected for at least one All-Star Game |

== Expansion draft ==
The following players were drafted for the rosters of the Sky from the league's existing teams on November 16, 2005:

| Pick | Player | Position | Nationality | Former team | WNBA years (Note: Number of years played in the WNBA prior to the draft) | Career with the franchise (Note: Number of years played for expansion franchise that drafted player) | Ref. |
|---|---|---|---|---|---|---|---|
| 1 | Jia Perkins ^{+} | G | United States | Charlotte Sting | 2 | 2006–2010 | |
| 2 | Brooke Wyckoff | F | United States | Connecticut Sun | 4 | 2006–2009 | |
| 3 | Elaine Powell | G | United States | Detroit Shock | 7 | 2006 | |
| 4 | Kiesha Brown | G | United States | Houston Comets | 4 | — | |
| 5 | Deanna Jackson | F | United States | Indiana Fever | 4 | 2006 | |
| 6 | Laura Macchi | F | Italy | Los Angeles Sparks | 2 | — | |
| 7 | Stacey Lovelace-Tolbert | F | United States | Minnesota Lynx | 4 | 2006 | |
| 8 | DeTrina White | F | United States | New York Liberty | 2 | — | |
| 9 | Ashley Robinson | C | United States | Phoenix Mercury | 2 | 2006 | |
| 10 | Chelsea Newton | G | United States | Sacramento Monarchs | 1 | 2006 | |
| 11 | Bernadette Ngoyisa | C | Democratic Republic of the Congo | San Antonio Silver Stars | 2 | 2006 | |
| 12 | Francesca Zara | G | Italy | Seattle Storm | 1 | — | |
| 13 | Stacey Dales-Schuman ^{+} | G | Canada | Washington Mystics | 3 | 2006–2007 | |
