= Edwina Brown =

American basketball player (born 1978)

Personal information
- Born: July 1, 1978 (age 48) Dallas, Texas, U.S.
- Listed height: 5 ft 9 in (1.75 m)
- Listed weight: 163 lb (74 kg)

Career information
- High school: Lockhart (Lockhart, Texas)
- College: Texas (1996–2000)
- WNBA draft: 2000: 1st round, 3rd overall pick
- Drafted by: Detroit Shock
- Position: Guard / forward
- Number: 24

Career history
- 2000–2002: Detroit Shock
- 2003: Phoenix Mercury
- 2006: Houston Comets

Career highlights
- Wade Trophy (2000); Second-team All-American – AP (2000); Kodak All-American (2000); All-American – USBWA (2000); Big 12 Tournament Most Outstanding Player (2000); 2x First-team All-Big 12 (1999, 2000)
- Stats at WNBA.com
- Stats at Basketball Reference
Medals
Women's basketball
Representing the United States
Jones Cup
Gold medal – first place	1998 Taiwan	Team competition
Pan American Games
Bronze medal – third place	1999 Winnipeg	Team

Edwina Brown (born July 1, 1978) is an American former professional basketball player.

== Professional career ==
Brown was part of a three-way tie for second place in the 2000 WNBA Rookie of the Year voting. She played 130 games in the WNBA. She also played professionally in other countries: Lebanon, Austria, Spain, France and Israel.

== USA Basketball ==
Brown won a gold medal with Team USA at the 1998 R. Williams Jones Cup and a bronze medal at the 1999 Pan American Games.

== Personal life ==
Aside from basketball, Brown has worked with organizations that give back to their communities. She is the founder of MAP’D Out (Mentoring Athletes and Providing Dreams).

== Texas statistics ==
Legend
GP	Games played	GS	Games started	MPG	Minutes per game	RPG	Rebounds per game
APG	Assists per game	SPG	Steals per game	BPG	Blocks per game	PPG	Points per game
TO	Turnovers per game	FG%	Field-goal percentage	3P%	3-point field-goal percentage	FT%	Free-throw percentage
**Bold**	Career best	°	League leader

Year	Team	GP	Points	FG%	3P%	FT%	RPG	APG	SPG	BPG	PPG
1997	Texas	30	181	42.9%	0.0%	60.4%	3.8	1.7	1.2	0.1	6.0
1998	Texas	24	352	**50.0%**	0.0%	70.1%	4.9	4.3	2.6	0.2	14.7
1999	Texas	28	450	49.3%	22.2%	75.4%	7.5	5.7	2.2	0.0	16.1
2000	Texas	**34**	**722**	46.5%	**40.0%**	**76.4%**	**8.4**	**6.0**	**2.9**	**0.3**	**21.2**°
Career		116	1705	47.5%	21.1%	73.4%	6.3	4.5	2.2	0.2	14.7

== Career statistics ==
Legend
GP	Games played	GS	Games started	MPG	Minutes per game	RPG	Rebounds per game
APG	Assists per game	SPG	Steals per game	BPG	Blocks per game	PPG	Points per game
TO	Turnovers per game	FG%	Field-goal percentage	3P%	3-point field-goal percentage	FT%	Free-throw percentage
**Bold**	Career best	°	League leader

=== Regular season ===
Year	Team	GP	GS	MPG	FG%	3P%	FT%	RPG	APG	SPG	BPG	TO	PPG
2000	Detroit	32	7	19.3	.357	.250	.838	2.8	2.3	0.8	0.2	2.1	5.9
2001	Detroit	32	**14**	**25.0**	**.366**	.377	.783	**3.2**	**2.7**	**1.0**	0.2	2.1	**7.4**
2002	Detroit	28	7	19.6	.328	**.500**	.719	2.9	2.1	0.9	**0.3**	2.1	4.1
2003	Phoenix	**34**	6	15.4	.270	.000	.818	2.1	1.8	0.9	0.2	1.4	3.5
2006	Houston	4	0	7.0	.200	.000	**1.000**	1.0	0.3	0.3	0.0	**0.5**	1.0
Career	5 years, 3 teams	130	34	19.4	.334	.375	.803	2.7	2.2	0.9	0.2	1.9	5.1

== See also ==
- 2014–15 TCU Lady Frogs basketball team
