= 2015 NBA Development League expansion draft =

General information
- Sport: Basketball
- Date(s): August 20, 2015
- Location: New York, New York

Overview
- League: NBA
- Expansion teams: Raptors 905

The 2015 NBA Development League expansion draft was the eighth expansion draft of the National Basketball Association Development League (D-League). The draft was held on August 20, 2015, so that the newly founded Raptors 905 could acquire players for the upcoming 2015–16 season. The 16 players were chosen from a pool of unprotected players among the league's teams. Each returning D-League team could protect up to 12 of their players from being selected.

Three of the players that the Raptors chose had previously been named NBA D-League All-Stars: Dee Bost, Kevin Jones, and Mustafa Shakur. Five additional players had also been previously selected in an NBA draft: Dahntay Jones (2003), Earl Clark (2009), Luke Harangody (2010), Nolan Smith (2011), Ricky Ledo (2013).

== Key ==
Pos.	G	F	C
Position	Guard	Forward	Center

^	Denotes player who has been selected to (an) NBA Development League All-Star Game(s)
*	Denotes player who has been selected to (an) NBA Development League All-Star Game(s) and was also selected in an NBA draft
†	Denotes player who was also selected in an NBA Draft

== Draft ==
Pick	Player	Pos.	Nationality	Team	College
1	Dee Bost^{^}	G	United States	Raptors 905	Mississippi State
2	Earl Clark^{†}	F	United States	Raptors 905	Louisville
3	Abdul Gaddy	G	United States	Raptors 905	Washington
4	Luke Harangody^{†}	F	United States	Raptors 905	Notre Dame
5	Dahntay Jones^{†}	G/F	United States	Raptors 905	Duke
6	Kevin Jones^{^}	F	United States	Raptors 905	West Virginia
7	Ricky Ledo^{†}	G	United States	Raptors 905	Providence
8	C. J. Leslie	F	United States	Raptors 905	NC State
9	Ramone Moore	G	United States	Raptors 905	Temple
10	Mustafa Shakur^{^}	G	United States	Raptors 905	Arizona
11	Will Sheehey	F	United States	Raptors 905	Indiana
12	Nolan Smith^{†}	G	United States	Raptors 905	Duke
13	Scott Suggs	F	United States	Raptors 905	Washington
14	Ty Walker	C	United States	Raptors 905	Wake Forest
15	Mitchell Watt	C/F	United States	Raptors 905	Buffalo
16	Mikey Williams	G	United States	Raptors 905	Cal State Fullerton
