= Kedrick Brown =

American basketball player (born 1981)

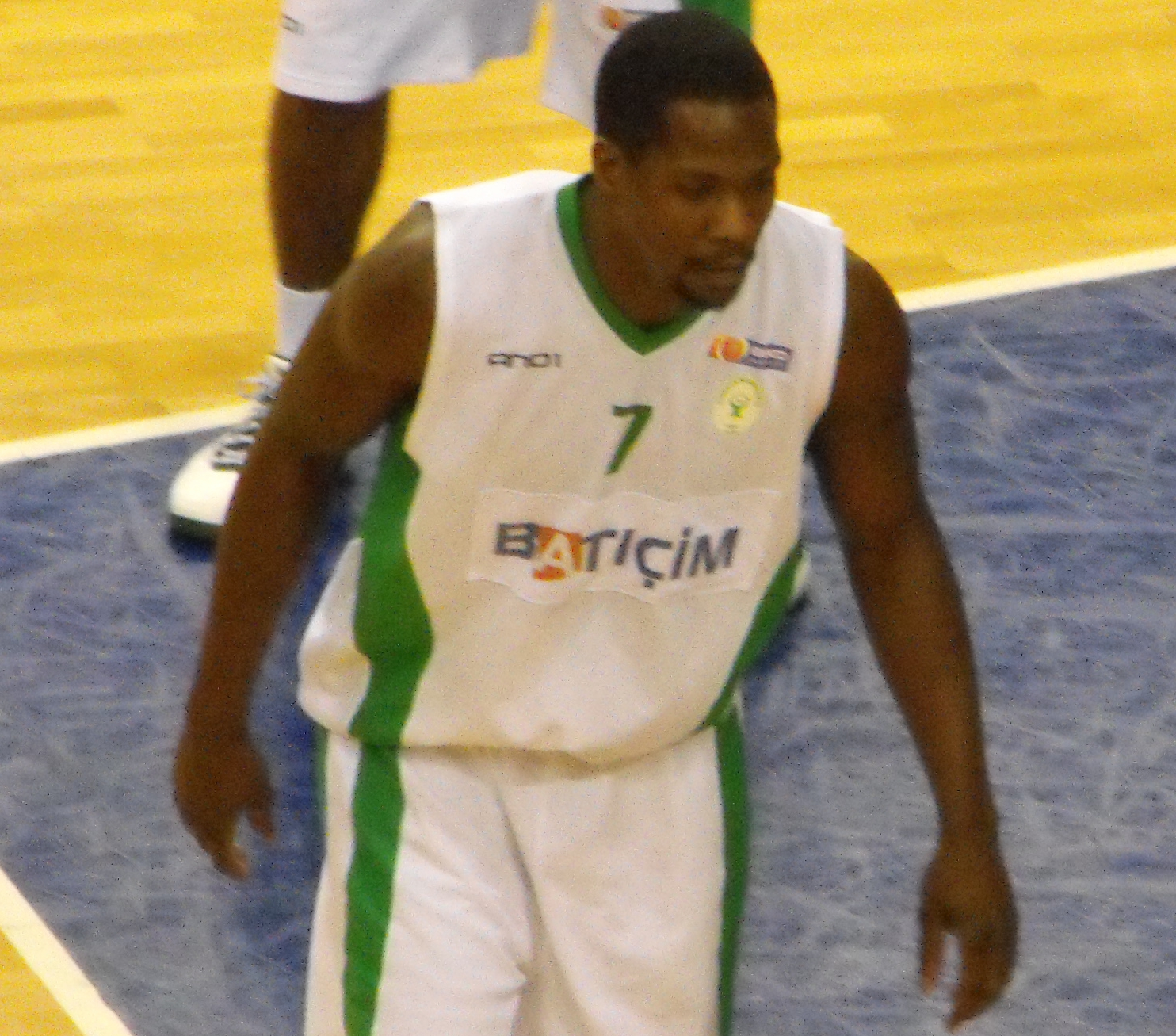

Personal information
- Born: March 18, 1981 (age 45) Zachary, Louisiana, U.S.
- Listed height: 6 ft 7 in (2.01 m)
- Listed weight: 222 lb (101 kg)

Career information
- High school: Zachary (Zachary, Louisiana)
- College: Okaloosa-Walton Community College (1999–2001)
- NBA draft: 2001: 1st round, 11th overall pick
- Drafted by: Boston Celtics
- Playing career: 2001–2012
- Position: Small forward
- Number: 42, 5
- Coaching career: 2017–2018

Career history

Playing
- 2001–2003: Boston Celtics
- 2003–2004: Cleveland Cavaliers
- 2004–2005: Philadelphia 76ers
- 2007–2009: Anaheim Arsenal
- 2009–2010: Bornova Belediye
- 2011–2012: Antalya BŞB

Coaching
- 2017–2018: Southern (player personnel)

Career highlights
- First team NJCAA All-American (2001)

Career NBA statistics
- Points: 509 (3.6 ppg)
- Rebounds: 347 (2.4 rpg)
- Assists: 103 (0.7 apg)
- Stats at NBA.com
- Stats at Basketball Reference

Albert Kedrick Brown (born March 18, 1981) is an American former professional basketball player and coach. Born and raised in Zachary, Louisiana, Brown played college basketball at Okaloosa-Walton Community College (now Northwest Florida State College), where he was a first team NJCAA All-America selection as a sophomore.

Brown was drafted with the 11th overall pick in the 2001 NBA draft by the Boston Celtics. He was traded to the Cleveland Cavaliers in December 2003 and was later dealt to the Philadelphia 76ers in July 2004.

== Professional career ==
=== Boston Celtics (2001–2003) ===
Brown was drafted 11th overall by the Boston Celtics in the 2001 NBA draft. On October 30, 2001, he made his NBA debut, playing five minutes in a 108–89 win over the Cleveland Cavaliers. On January 21, 2002, Brown scored a season-high 12 points, along with two rebounds and four steals, in a 106–97 win over the Toronto Raptors.

On January 18, 2003, Brown logged season-highs of 14 points and ten rebounds in a 97–95 win over the Milwaukee Bucks.

On November 7, 2003, Brown scored a career-high 18 points, along with six rebounds and two steals, in a 87–94 loss to the New Jersey Nets. On December 13, he played his final game for the Celtics, logging two points and an assist during a 105–98 win over the Cleveland Cavaliers, the team he would be traded to.

=== Cleveland Cavaliers (2003–2004) ===
On December 15, 2003, Brown was traded, along with Eric Williams and Tony Battie, to the Cleveland Cavaliers in exchange for Ricky Davis, Chris Mihm, and Michael Stewart.

=== Philadelphia 76ers (2004–2005) ===
On July 20, 2004, Brown was traded, along with Kevin Ollie, to the Philadelphia 76ers in exchange for Eric Snow. Brown's final NBA game was played on February 4, 2005, in a 103–85 win over the Atlanta Hawks where Kedrick played for 2 and half minutes and scored 1 point.

=== Anaheim Arsenal (2007–2009) ===
Brown was selected ninth overall by the Anaheim Arsenal in the 2007 NBA D-League draft.

Brown was selected 12th overall by the Maine Red Claws in the 2009 NBA D-League expansion draft. However, he never played a game for the team.

=== Bornova (2009–2010) ===
In 2009, Brown joined Bornova for the team's first season in the Turkish Basketball First League (TBL).

=== Antalya (2011–2012) ===
For the final season of his professional basketball career, Brown joined Antalya.

== Coaching career ==
Brown joined the player personnel of the Southern Jaguars men's basketball team in 2017.

== Career statistics ==
Legend
GP	Games played	GS	Games started	MPG	Minutes per game
FG%	Field goal percentage	3P%	3-point field goal percentage	FT%	Free throw percentage
RPG	Rebounds per game	APG	Assists per game	SPG	Steals per game
BPG	Blocks per game	PPG	Points per game	**Bold**	Career high

=== NBA ===
==== Regular season ====
Year	Team	GP	GS	MPG	FG%	3P%	FT%	RPG	APG	SPG	BPG	PPG
2001–02	Boston	29	5	8.4	.329	.185	.600	1.7	.5	.6	.2	2.2
2002–03	Boston	**51**	5	13.1	.357	.077	.625	2.7	.4	.7	**.3**	2.8
2003–04	Boston	21	10	**19.4**	.455	.375	.615	**3.2**	**1.2**	**.8**	.1	5.2
2003–04	Cleveland	34	**16**	16.5	**.465**	**.388**	.643	2.3	1.1	.4	.1	**5.3**
2004–05	Philadelphia	8	0	6.9	.333	.000	**.800**	1.4	.5	.4	.1	1.5
Career		143	36	13.5	.405	.274	.640	2.4	.7	.6	.2	3.6

==== Playoffs ====
Year	Team	GP	GS	MPG	FG%	3P%	FT%	RPG	APG	SPG	BPG	PPG
2002	Boston	2	0	1.5	**1.000**	**1.000**	–	.0	.0	.0	**.5**	**2.5**
2003	Boston	**3**	0	**3.7**	.250	–	**.500**	**.7**	.0	**.3**	.0	1.0
Career		5	0	2.8	.500	1.000	.500	.4	.0	.2	.2	1.6
