= 2003 McDonald's All-American Boys Game =

American high school basketball game

East	West
122	107
	1st half	2nd half	Total
East	60	62	122
West	51	56	107
- Date: March 26, 2003
- Venue: Gund Arena, Cleveland, OH
- MVP: LeBron James
- Referees: 1; 2; 3
- Attendance: 18,728
- Network: ESPN

McDonald's All-American

The 2003 McDonald's All-American Boys Game was an all-star basketball game played on Wednesday, March 26, 2003, at Gund Arena in Cleveland, Ohio, home of the NBA's Cleveland Cavaliers. The game's rosters featured the best and most highly recruited high school boys graduating in 2003. The game was the 26th annual version of the McDonald's All-American Game first played in 1978.

== 2003 game ==
The game was telecast live on ESPN. Luol Deng, Olu Famutimi and David Padgett did not play due to injuries. LeBron James, who played wearing number 32 instead of his usual 23, since that number was retired in honor of Michael Jordan, was named the game's MVP after finishing with 27 points, 7 rebounds and 7 assists. James was the East team leading scorer, while Shannon Brown led the West team with 23 points. Chris Paul finished with a game-high 10 assists. Of the players who participated in this game, 5 declared for the 2003 NBA draft and were selected: LeBron James (1st overall pick), Travis Outlaw (1st round, 23rd overall), Ndudi Ebi (1st round, 26th overall), Kendrick Perkins (1st round, 27th overall) and James Lang (2nd round, 48th overall).

== Dunk contest ==
The Powerade Jam Fest took place on March 24, 2003, at Cleveland State University's Woodling Gym, and was broadcast on ESPN on April 4, 2003. LeBron James was the winner with 250 points.

== East roster ==
No.	Name	Height	Weight	Position	Hometown	High school	College of Choice
1	Ivan Harris	6-7	215	F	Mouth of Wilson, VA, U.S.	Oak Hill Academy	Ohio State
3	Chris Paul	6-1	170	G	Clemmons, NC, U.S.	West Forsyth	Wake Forest
20	Mike Jones	6-5	195	G	Braintree, MA, U.S.	Thayer Academy	Maryland
22	Mustafa Shakur	6-3	230	G	Philadelphia, PA, U.S.	Friends Central	Arizona
24	Drew Lavender	5-7	150	G	Columbus, OH, U.S.	Brookhaven	Oklahoma
25	Travis Outlaw	6-9	210	F	Starkville, MS, U.S.	Starkville High School	Mississippi State (Did Not Attend)
30	Brandon Bass	6-8	245	F	Baton Rouge, LA, U.S.	Capitol High School	LSU
31	Charlie Villanueva	6-10	220	F	Blairstown, NJ, U.S.	Blair Academy	Connecticut
32	LeBron James	6-8	240	F	Akron, OH, U.S.	St.Vincent-St. Mary	Undecided (Did not attend)
44	Jackie Butler	6-10	255	C	McComb, MS, U.S.	McComb High School	Mississippi State (Did Not Attend)
54	James Lang	6-10	305	C	Birmingham, AL, U.S.	Central Park Christian	Undecided (Did not attend)
N/A	Luol Deng	6-8	220	F	Blairstown, NJ, U.S.	Blair Academy	Duke

== West roster ==
No.	Name	Height	Weight	Position	Hometown	High school	College of Choice
5	Brandon Cotton	6-0	175	G	Detroit, MI, U.S.	St. Martin DePorres	Michigan State
21	Shannon Brown	6-3	190	G	Maywood, IL, U.S.	Proviso East	Michigan State
22	Vakeaton Wafer	6-6	210	F	Cleveland, TX, U.S.	Heritage Christian Academy	Florida State
30	Aaron Brooks	6-0	160	G	Seattle, WA, U.S.	Franklin	Oregon
34	Kris Humphries	6-9	230	F	Minnetonka, MN, U.S.	Hopkins	Duke
35	J.R. Giddens	6-6	190	G	Oklahoma City, OK, U.S.	John Marshall	Kansas
42	Brian Butch	6-11	215	C	Appleton, WI, U.S.	Appleton West	Wisconsin
43	Kendrick Perkins	6-10	285	C	Beaumont, TX, U.S.	Clifton J. Ozen	Memphis (Did not attend)
44	Ndudi Ebi	6-9	195	F	Houston, TX, U.S.	Westbury Christian	Arizona (Did not attend)
55	Leon Powe	6-8	240	G	Oakland, CA, U.S.	Oakland Tech	California
N/A	Olu Famutimi	6-5	210	G	Flint, MI, U.S.	Northwestern	Arkansas
N/A	David Padgett	6-11	240	C	Reno, NV, U.S.	Reno	Kansas

== Coaches ==
The East team was coached by:

- Head Coach Ron Hecklinski of Anderson High School (Anderson, Indiana)
- Asst Coach Joe Nadaline of Anderson High School (Anderson, Indiana)
- Asst Coach Doug Mitchell of North Central High School (Indianapolis, Indiana)

The West team was coached by:

- Head Coach Gary Ernst of Mountain View High School (Mesa, Arizona)
- Asst Coach Dennis McGowan of Mountain View High School (Mesa, Arizona)
- Asst Coach Jason Palmer of Mountain View High School (Mesa, Arizona)
