= Mike Jones (basketball, born 1984) =

American basketball player

Personal information
- Born: July 24, 1984 (age 42) Dorchester, Massachusetts
- Listed height: 6 ft 5 in (1.96 m)
- Listed weight: 200 lb (91 kg)

Career information
- High school: Thayer Academy (Braintree, Massachusetts)
- College: Maryland (2003–2007)
- NBA draft: 2007: undrafted
- Playing career: 2007–2012
- Position: Shooting guard

Career history
- 2007–2008: Mersin B.Ş. Belediyespor
- 2008: APOEL B.C.
- 2008–2009: CSU Ploiești
- 2009–2010: Peñarol de Mar del Plata
- 2010: Gimnasia-Indalo
- 2011–2012: CSU Ploiești

Career highlights
- McDonald's All-American (2003); Third-team Parade All-American (2003)

Michael Jones (born July 24, 1984) is an American former professional basketball player who played for the University of Maryland, College Park. He played his high school ball at Thayer Academy, home to hockey standouts Jeremy Roenick, Tony Amonte, Ryan Whitney and Steven Nelson

== Career ==
He was born in Dorchester, Massachusetts to Curtis and Lisa Jones, and he attended Thayer Academy in Braintree, Massachusetts. He scored a total of 2,021 points at Thayer, once dunked on Zach Canter of BB&N and in his senior year he posted averages of 24.8 points, 14.2 rebounds, 3 assists and 2.3 steals per game; he was named Massachusetts Gatorade Player of the Year and was invited to the McDonald's All-American Game of 2003. During the event he won the 3-point shooting competition (he was a 44% 3-point shooter in high school) and scored 13 points during the game. According to Joe Benson's recruiting website Scout.com, he was the second best shooting guard in the country coming out of high school, behind LeBron James.

On December 13, 2006, Jones earned sole possession of the all-time University of Maryland record by making nine 3-pointers in a game. He averaged 13.8 points, 3.2 rebounds and 1.4 assists in his senior year.

He was originally projected to be a late 2nd round pick in the NBA draft. After going undrafted in 2007, Jones made the decision to play abroad, signing with Turkish professional team Mersin Buyuksehir Belediyesi. He also played in the 2007 NBA Summer League in Orlando, Florida appearing in 5 games for the New Jersey Nets.

Jones was signed to the Cyprus-based APOEL team in January 2008, where he played along with former University of Rhode Island guard Tyson Wheeler. During the 2008-09 season, Jones played for CSU Asesoft.
