= 2006 San Antonio Silver Stars season =

- Head coach: Dan Hughes
- Arena: AT&T Center

Results
- Record: 13–21 (.382)
- Place: 6th (Western)
- Playoff finish: Did not qualify

The 2006 WNBA season was the 10th for the San Antonio Silver Stars. It was their 4th season in San Antonio. The Silver Stars failed to qualify for the fourth consecutive season. This was the last season San Antonio had failed to make the playoffs.

== Offseason ==
- The Chicago Sky selected Bernadette Ngoyisa from San Antonio in the Expansion Draft.

=== WNBA draft ===
Round	Pick	Player	Nationality	School/Club team
1	4	Sophia Young (F)	Saint Vincent and the Grenadines	Baylor
2	16	Shanna Zolman (G)	United States	Tennessee
3	30	Khara Smith (F)	United States	DePaul

== Regular season ==
=== Season standings ===
Western Conference	W	L	PCT	GB	Home	Road	Conf.
Los Angeles Sparks ^{x}	25	9	.735	–	15–2	10–7	15–5
Sacramento Monarchs ^{x}	21	13	.618	4.0	14–3	7–10	10–10
Houston Comets ^{x}	18	16	.529	7.0	12–5	6–11	11–9
Seattle Storm ^{x}	18	16	.529	7.0	9–8	9–8	10–10
Phoenix Mercury ^{o}	18	16	.529	7.0	10–7	8–9	8–12
San Antonio Silver Stars ^{o}	13	21	.382	12.0	6–11	7–10	10–10
Minnesota Lynx ^{o}	10	24	.294	15.0	8–9	2–15	6–14

=== Season schedule ===
Date	Opponent	Score	Result	Record
May 21	@ Houston	79-63	Win	1-0
May 23	Indiana	53-62	Loss	1-1
May 25	Los Angeles	71-80	Loss	1-2
May 31	@ Phoenix	82-76	Win	2-2
June 2	@ Sacramento	74-71	Win	3-2
June 4	@ Seattle	89-87	Win	4-2
June 9	Minnesota	79-86	Loss	4-3
June 10	New York	67-70	Loss	4-4
June 16	Minnesota	90-60	Win	5-4
June 17	@ Chicago	69-65	Win	6-4
June 21	@ Sacramento	69-75	Loss	6-5
June 23	@ Seattle	57-87	Loss	6-6
June 25	@ Los Angeles	80-105	Loss	6-7
June 27	Detroit	59-63	Loss	6-8
June 30	@ New York	91-78	Win	7-8
July 1	Chicago	69-57	Win	8-8
July 3	@ Los Angeles	85-63	Win	9-8
July 7	Houston	94-75	Win	10-8
July 9	@ Minnesota	80-85	Loss	10-9
July 14	@ Charlotte	65-81	Loss	10-10
July 16	@ Detroit	67-77	Loss	10-11
July 18	Houston	67-64	Win	11-11
July 21	Washington	77-80	Loss	11-12
July 22	Connecticut	61-79	Loss	11-13
July 26	Los Angeles	67-81	Loss	11-14
July 28	Phoenix	98-96	Win	12-14
July 30	@ Connecticut	65-72	Loss	12-15
August 1	Charlotte	65-68	Loss	12-16
August 3	Sacramento	69-87	Loss	12-17
August 5	@ Indiana	70-76	Loss	12-18
August 6	@ Minnesota	68-82	Loss	12-19
August 8	@ Washington	79-91	Loss	12-20
August 10	Seattle	75-65	Win	13-20
August 12	Phoenix	93-95	Loss	13-21

== Player stats ==
Player	GP	REB	AST	STL	BLK	PTS
Sophia Young	34	257	50	57	13	408
Agnieszka Bibrzycka	32	66	48	26	12	361
Vickie Johnson	34	167	122	28	3	337
Shannon Johnson	32	95	117	60	5	318
Kaite Feenstra	34	209	14	12	26	265
Shanna Crossley	34	41	34	11	4	226
Kendra Wecker	34	84	47	11	3	190
LaToya Thomas	19	82	22	14	7	157
Chantelle Anderson	23	85	15	7	10	153
Dalma Ivanyi	31	41	50	12	0	42
Shyra Ely	12	31	10	2	0	41
Jae Kingi-Cross	18	10	11	6	0	25
