= Kirk Walters =

American basketball player (born 1984)

Kirk Walters was born in Omaha, Nebraska on November 28, 1984. He graduated in 2003 from South Christian High School which is located in Grand Rapids, Michigan. [1] He is a retired professional Basketball Center who last played for the Anaheim Arsenal in the NBADL. [2]

== College basketball ==
Kirk Walters played five seasons with the University of Arizona Wildcats from 2004 until 2008. During his five-year stint with the Arizona Wildcats, he scored a total of 269 points and grabbed a total of 175 rebounds. His most productive year playing College Basketball was during the 2005–06 Season when he scored 201 points and grabbed 117 rebounds for the Arizona Wildcats. [3] Walters was forced to redshirt the 2006–07 season due to a concussion and later contracting Mononucleosis. [3]

== Professional basketball ==
Kirk Walters was drafted by the Anaheim Arsenal in the fifth round of the 2008 NBA Development League draft. With a height of 6'11", he was the second tallest player on the team, next to Marcus Campbell (Basketball) who is 7'0", and the starting Center for The Arsenal.
