= Arkansas RimRockers =

- League: NBA Development League
- Founded: 2004
- Folded: 2007
- History: Arkansas RimRockers; 2004–2007; ABA: 2004–2005; NBA D-League: 2005–2007
- Arena: Alltel Arena
- Location: North Little Rock, Arkansas
- Team colors: red, white, blue
- Head coach: Andy Stoglin
- Ownership: Larry Crain
- Affiliations: Atlanta Hawks; Cleveland Cavaliers; Memphis Grizzlies; Miami Heat; Toronto Raptors
- Championships: 1 (ABA)

The Arkansas RimRockers were a minor league basketball team based in North Little Rock, Arkansas, which played in the American Basketball Association and the NBA Development League.

== Season by season ==
Season	League	Division	Finish	Wins	Losses	Pct.	Postseason Results
Arkansas RimRockers
2004–05	ABA	White	1st	28	5	.848	Won Quarterfinals (Ontario) 136–97; Won Semifinals (Kentucky) 135–123; Won Final Four (Mississippi) 117–105; Won ABA Finals (Bellevue) 118–103
2005–06	D-League		5th	24	24	.500	
2006–07	D-League	Eastern	6th	16	34	.320	
Regular season				68	63	.519	2004–2007
Playoffs				4	0	1.000	2004–2007

== Franchise history ==
The RimRockers began play during the 2004–05 season for the American Basketball Association. They posted a 32–5 record in the team's inaugural season and won the ABA championship. Soon after winning the title, they left the ABA alongside the Long Beach Jam and began play in the NBA Development League for the 2005–06 season.

On February 10, 2006, the team fired head coach Joe Harge, the only man to coach the team up to that point. He was replaced by Andy Stoglin.

Stoglin said he would bring a much different style that begins with strict discipline. He joined the organization as an assistant during the 2005–06 season after leading the Mississippi Stingers to the ABA semifinals, where they lost to Arkansas. Stoglin has been coaching since 1969, including a 13-year run as Jackson State's head coach.

The team did not return to Arkansas for 2007-08 because attendance dropped to the point that the owner could no longer afford the lease. The team hoped to move to La Crosse, Wisconsin, to play at the La Crosse Center for the 2007–08 season, where they would have been known as the La Crosse RimRockers. However, due to the center's lease demands being higher than Little Rock's, the deal fell through. The team was inactive for the 2007–08 season, and again in the 2008–09 season.

== Players of note ==
- Pape Sow
- Jamario Moon
- Todd Day
- Roger Powell, Jr.
- Kareem Reid
- Clay Tucker
- Scotty Thurman
- Derek Clifton
- Pat Bradley
- Oliver Miller

=== Final roster ===
Arkansas RimRockers; Final Roster
Head coach: Andy Stoglin
G	8	DeAnthony Bowden	(Creighton)
G	13	Brandon Dean	(Arkansas)
SG	23	Olu Famutimi	(Arkansas)
F	33	Brian Jackson	(Oregon State)
C	54	James Lang	(Central Park Christian School, (HS) AL)
PG	12	Kareem Reid	(Arkansas)
F	32	Chris Shumate	(Murray State)
G/F	5	Donta Smith	(Southeastern Illinois JC)
G	6	Anthony Roberson	(Florida)
G	24	Clay Tucker	(Milwaukee '03)
G	19	Rudy Roquemore	(UC Santa Barbara '03)
(FA) - Free Agent			Arkansas RimRockers

== NBA affiliates ==
- Atlanta Hawks (2005–2007)
- Cleveland Cavaliers (2005–2006)
- Memphis Grizzlies (2005–2007)
- Miami Heat (2006–2007)
- Toronto Raptors (2005–2006)
