= Oksana Zakalyuzhnaya =

Russian basketball player (born 1977)

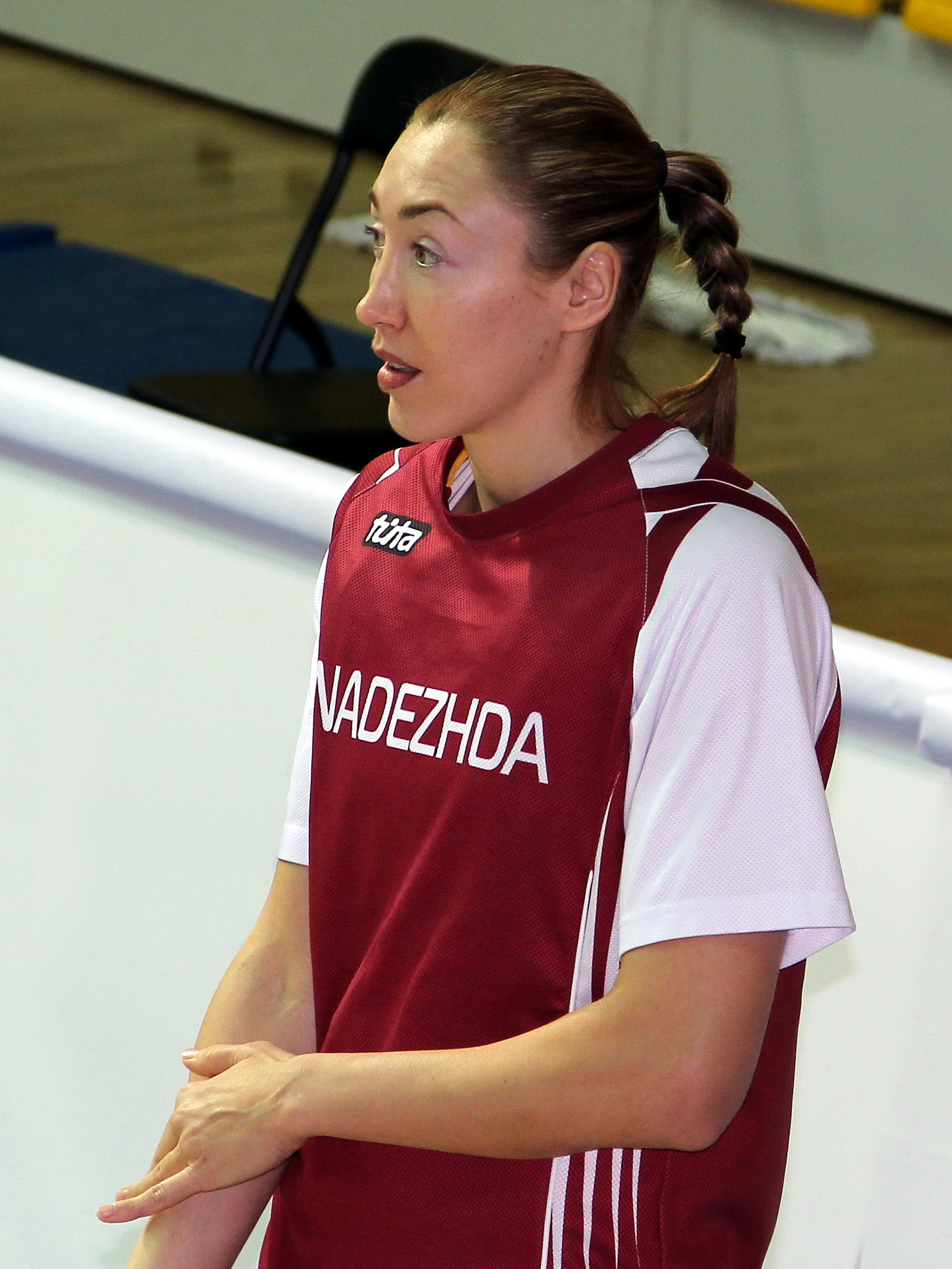
- Zakalyuzhnaya in 2012

Personal information
- Born: 18 December 1977 (age 48) Arkhangelsk, Russia
- Height: 199 cm (6 ft 6 in)
- Weight: 79 kg (174 lb)

Sport
- Sport: Basketball
- Club: Volna (1994–2000); Tulsa Shock (2000, 2002); Fenerbahçe (2000–2002); Sopron (2002–2004); WBC Dynamo Novosibirsk (2005); UMMC Ekaterinburg (2005–2007); BC Moscow (2007–2008); Dynamo Moscow (2008–2009); Nadezhda Orenburg (2009–2012)
Medal record
Representing Russia
World Championships
Silver medal – second place	2002 China	Team

Oksana Anatolyevna Zakalyuzhnaya (Russian: Оксана Анатольевна Закалюжная, born 18 December 1977) is a retired Russian basketball center. She was part of the Russian team that won the silver medal at the 2002 World Championships. Between 1994 and 2012 she played for Russian, American, Hungarian and Turkish clubs, winning the Turkish national title with Fenerbahçe in 2001, and reaching the European Cup finals in 2008 and 2010. She also played in the Women's National Basketball Association (WNBA) for the Detroit Shock and Phoenix Mercury.
