= Olu Famutimi =

Canadian basketball player

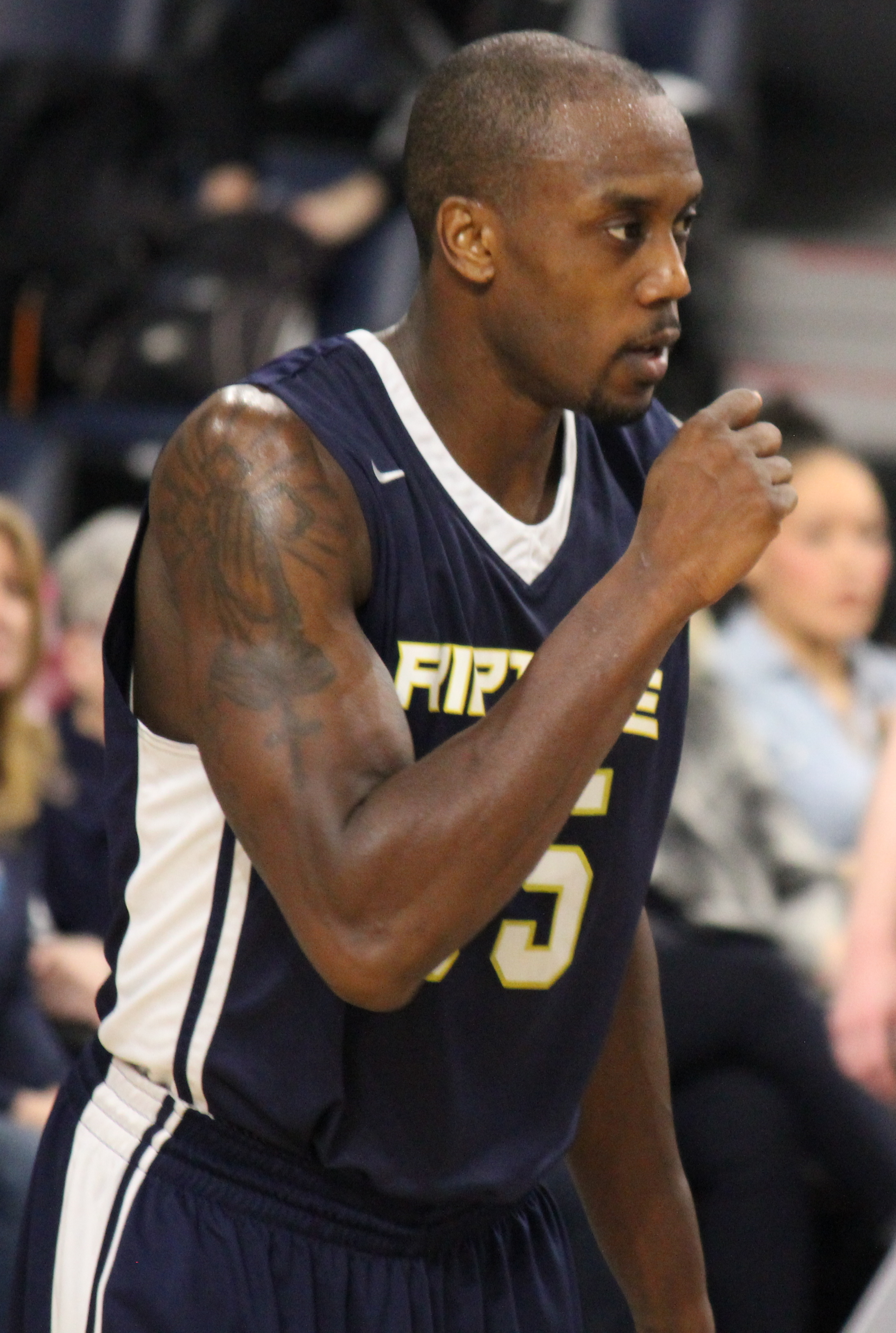
- Famutimi in 2017

Personal information
- Born: February 21, 1984 (age 42) Toronto, Ontario
- Listed height: 6 ft 5 in (1.96 m)
- Listed weight: 212 lb (96 kg)

Career information
- High school: Northwestern (Flint, Michigan)
- College: Arkansas (2003–2005)
- NBA draft: 2005: undrafted
- Playing career: 2005–2022
- Position: Small forward

Career history
- 2005–2007: Arkansas RimRockers
- 2007–2009: Khimik Yuzhne
- 2009–2010: Oyak Renault
- 2010: Paris-Levallois Basket
- 2010–2011: Düsseldorf Giants
- 2011–2012: TED Ankara Kolejliler
- 2012: Al-Manama
- 2013–2014: Halifax Rainmen
- 2014–2015: Island Storm
- 2016: Saint John Mill Rats
- 2016: Quilmes de Mar del Plata
- 2016–2018: Saint John Riptide
- 2018–2019: Cape Breton Highlanders
- 2019–2020: KW Titans
- 2020–2021: Guelph Nighthawks
- 2021: Edmonton Stingers
- 2022: Scarborough Shooting Stars

Career highlights
- Fourth-team Parade All-American (2003); McDonald's All-American (2003)

Olumuyiwa "Olu" Famutimi (born February 21, 1984) is a Canadian former professional basketball player. He played college basketball for Arkansas.

== Early life ==
Famutimi is of Nigerian descent. He was first noticed in a high school game at Chaminade College School in Toronto, Ontario, in his freshman year. Less than a year later, he transferred to Flint Northwestern High School in Flint, Michigan. In Michigan, he played for the Flint Northwestern Wildcats and climbed the national ranks as the seventh best player in the country, according to ESPN.com. A career altering injury would change all of that, as he was ushered out of the limelight because of it.

== Collegiate career ==
Famutimi played two seasons at the University of Arkansas, where he earned All-Southeastern Conference Freshman honors. In 57 games with the Razorbacks, he averaged 8.3 points and 3.9 rebounds in 22.2 minutes per game. Against all odds, he declared early for the 2005 NBA draft and was not selected.

== Professional career ==
Famutimi was invited to training camp with the Philadelphia 76ers and made appearances in four preseason games (4.5 ppg, 2.0 rpg) before being waived. He played 47 games for the Arkansas RimRockers in 2005–06 and averaged 6.8 points and 2.7 rebounds in 16.5 minutes per game while shooting .513 (122–238) from the field. Famutimi signed with the San Antonio Spurs as a free agent in 2006 but was waived before the season started. He played in Turkey for two years and also played in France, Germany, and Ukraine.

On December 17, 2013, Famutimi signed with the Halifax Rainmen of the NBL Canada. After a one-year stint with the Island Storm, Famutimi signed with the Saint John Mill Rats on March 14, 2016.

On August 18, 2016, Famutimi signed with Quilmes de Mar del Plata of the Liga Nacional de Básquet. In October 2016, he parted ways with Quilmes after appearing in ten games.

On November 3, 2016, he signed with Saint John Riptide for the 2016–17 NBL Canada season.

He played the 2019 CEBL season for the Guelph Nighthawks. Famutimi joined the KW Titans in 2019. Famutimi joined the Edmonton Stingers for the 2021–22 BCL Americas.

On May 12, 2022, Famutimi signed with the Scarborough Shooting Stars of the CEBL.

== International career ==
Famutimi plays internationally for the Canadian national team.
