= Expansion draft =

Method of creating new teams in sports

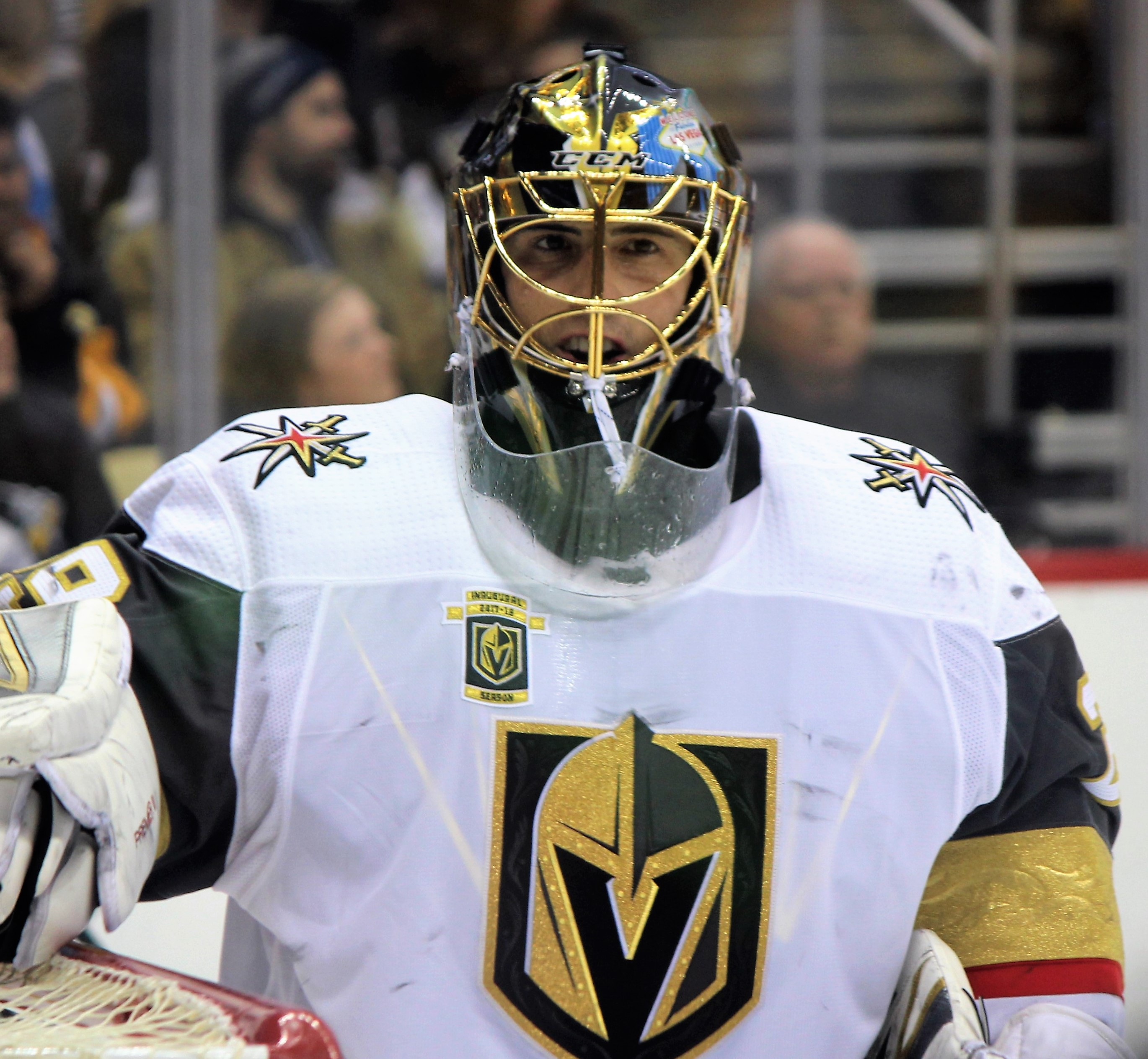
Ice hockey goaltender Marc-André Fleury with the Vegas Golden Knights, the team that selected him in the 2017 NHL expansion draft

An expansion draft, in professional sports, occurs when a sports league decides to create one or more new expansion teams or franchises. This occurs mainly in North American sports and closed leagues. One of the ways of stocking the new team or teams is an expansion draft. Although how each league conducts them varies, and they vary from occasion to occasion, the system is usually something similar to the following:

Each existing team is told it can "protect" a certain number of its existing contracted players by furnishing their names to the league office on or before a certain date. The expansion team(s) then are allowed to select players not on the protected lists in a manner somewhat similar to an entry draft. There are generally a maximum number of players that can be selected from any one team, at least without the team losing the player receiving something in compensation such as a future entry draft pick.

Teams subject to losing players usually tend to put most if not all of the players they truly need to stay competitive on the protected list. This means that the expansion team is often left to choose among players who are old, injury prone, failing to develop as the teams had intended, or perhaps so highly compensated that a team wishes to remove them from the payroll. For this reason, expansion teams are often noncompetitive in their early years in a league, although the advent of the free agent system has modified this somewhat. Marc-André Fleury, who won three Stanley Cups with the Pittsburgh Penguins, is a notable exception of a star player in their prime being left exposed in an expansion draft, being made available for the Vegas Golden Knights in the 2017 NHL expansion draft after Fleury was made expendable due to the rise of Matt Murray at goaltender. The rules of the draft can be tweaked by the league to make the expansion team more competitive if that is the business objective of the league's expansion.

Most expansion teams try to construct a team that will suffice until the team can begin to develop its own talent. Occasionally, players selected in the expansion draft benefit from the change in environment and become stars, either again or for the first time.

A process similar to an expansion draft occurs when an existing team is disbanded and the players under contract to it become available to the remaining teams; this process is referred to as a dispersal draft.

== Expansion drafts ==
=== American football ===
Through the history of the National Football League (NFL), the NFL has held eight expansion drafts in order to accommodate newcoming teams. Half of them took place in 1960s, when the league was expanding quickly, facing the competition from American Football League (AFL). The most recent was held in 2002, as the NFL reached its current state of 32 teams. During its ten-year existence, the AFL had two expansion drafts, one in January 1966 for the Miami Dolphins (referred to as a "stocking draft") and one in January 1968 for the Cincinnati Bengals.

==== NFL expansion drafts ====
- 1960 NFL expansion draft – to select players for the Dallas Cowboys
- 1961 NFL expansion draft – to select players for the Minnesota Vikings
- 1966 NFL expansion draft – to select players for the Atlanta Falcons
- 1967 NFL expansion draft – to select players for the New Orleans Saints
- 1976 NFL expansion draft – to select players for the Seattle Seahawks and Tampa Bay Buccaneers
- 1995 NFL expansion draft – to select players for the Carolina Panthers and Jacksonville Jaguars
- 1999 NFL expansion draft – to select players for the reactivation of the Cleveland Browns
- 2002 NFL expansion draft – to select players for the Houston Texans

The first NFL expansion draft took place in 1960 to let the Dallas Cowboys pick their initial players. Because the new franchise approval happened too late, this was the only time in NFL history that a new franchise could not participate in the annual amateur draft and thus missed the opportunity to select college football players during the 1960 NFL draft. The next season, the NFL added a 14th team to its roster, the Minnesota Vikings. In the ensuing expansion draft, the new team picked three players from each of the other franchises (except the still very new Cowboys). Together with their participation in the 1961 NFL draft of college players, this gave the Vikings enough strength to record three victories in their first season.

Later in 1960s, the NFL added two more franchises. In 1966, an expansion draft was held for the Atlanta Falcons, one year later another expansion draft happened for the 16th team of the league, the New Orleans Saints. As in previous drafts, the new franchise could take three players from each of the existing teams (the still-new Falcons were exempt from giving up players to the Saints). However, existing teams were allowed to exclude large parts of their roster from the draft, to avoid losing their most valuable players.

As a result of the AFL–NFL merger in 1970, the NFL consisted of 26 teams organized into two 13-team conferences. The merger itself didn't require expansion drafts, as AFL teams were already well-established and of comparable strength. The next expansion draft happened in 1976, when the Seattle Seahawks and Tampa Bay Buccaneers joined the league.

The most recent three expansion drafts took place between 1995 and 2002. In 1995, two new teams, the Carolina Panthers and Jacksonville Jaguars were allowed to pick between 30 and 42 players each from existing teams' rosters. In 1999, an expansion draft was held for the Cleveland Browns, reactivated as the 31st team in the league. This draft was regarded as giving the new team too little, while letting existing teams to protect basically all players they wanted. Finally, as the Houston Texans joined the league in 2002 as the 32nd NFL team, an expansion draft was held for them. The rules of this expansion draft were adjusted following the reception of the 1999 expansion draft.

=== Australian rules football ===
Adding players to new teams in Australian rules football has primarily been accomplished by allowing a new team to have expanded access to certain unsigned players and by giving the new team preferential treatment in the league's annual draft of unsigned players. Examples include:

- 1986 VFL draft – the Brisbane Bears received the first selection in every round, and six pre-draft selections, as well as complete access to all players from Queensland. The West Coast Eagles were also granted similarly exclusive home-state rights.
- 1994 AFL draft – the Fremantle Dockers were given the first pick in the draft.
- 1996 AFL draft – the Port Adelaide Football Club was allowed to recruit some un-contracted players from other teams in the league.
- 2010 AFL draft – the Gold Coast Suns were given additional draft selections, early access to recruit 17-year-old players, and access to un-contracted and previously listed players in the offseason.
- 2011 AFL draft – the Greater Western Sydney Giants were given additional draft selections, early access to recruit 17-year-old players, and access to un-contracted and previously listed players in the offseason.

Examples of a new Australian rules football team being allowed to draft contracted players from the rosters of other teams in the league are lacking.

=== Baseball ===
Baseball expansion was initially hastened by the threat of a competing league, known as the Continental League, which was announced in 1959 and scheduled to begin play in the 1961 season.

- 1960 Major League Baseball expansion draft – to select players for the Los Angeles Angels and Washington Senators of the American League (AL)
- 1961 Major League Baseball expansion draft – to select players for the Houston Colt .45s and New York Mets of the National League (NL)
- 1968 Major League Baseball expansion draft – to select players for the Montreal Expos and San Diego Padres of the NL and the Kansas City Royals and Seattle Pilots of the AL
- 1976 Major League Baseball expansion draft – to select players for the Seattle Mariners and Toronto Blue Jays of the AL
- 1992 Major League Baseball expansion draft – to select players for the Colorado Rockies and Florida Marlins of the NL
- 1997 Major League Baseball expansion draft – to select players for the Arizona Diamondbacks and Tampa Bay Devil Rays of the NL and AL, respectively

=== Basketball ===
==== NBA ====
There have been 11 expansion drafts in National Basketball Association history. The most recent expansion draft was in 2004 when the Charlotte Bobcats (now Charlotte Hornets) joined the league as the 30th team.

==== NBA G League ====
During all expansion drafts, the G League was known as the NBA Development League.

- 2006 NBA Development League expansion draft
- 2007 NBA Development League expansion draft
- 2008 NBA Development League expansion draft
- 2009 NBA Development League expansion draft
- 2010 NBA Development League expansion draft
- 2013 NBA Development League expansion draft
- 2014 NBA Development League expansion draft
- 2015 NBA Development League expansion draft

==== PBA ====
- 1990 PBA expansion draft
- 2000 PBA expansion draft
- 2014 PBA expansion draft

==== WNBA ====
- 1998 WNBA expansion draft
- 1999 WNBA expansion draft
- 2000 WNBA expansion draft
- 2006 WNBA expansion draft
- 2008 WNBA expansion draft
- 2024 WNBA expansion draft
- 2026 WNBA expansion draft

=== Canadian football ===
- 2002 CFL expansion draft
- 2013 CFL expansion draft

=== Ice hockey ===
There have been 13 expansion drafts in the National Hockey League, including the 1979 draft following the NHL-WHA merger. The most recent draft was in 2021, involving the Seattle Kraken.

=== Soccer ===
- 1997 MLS expansion draft
- 2004 MLS expansion draft
- 2006 MLS expansion draft
- 2007 MLS expansion draft
- 2008 MLS expansion draft
- 2009 MLS expansion draft
- 2010 MLS expansion draft
- 2011 MLS expansion draft
- 2014 MLS expansion draft
- 2016 MLS expansion draft
- 2017 MLS expansion draft
- 2018 MLS expansion draft
- 2019 MLS expansion draft
- 2020 MLS expansion draft
- 2021 MLS expansion draft
- 2022 MLS expansion draft
- 2024 MLS expansion draft
