= James Lang (basketball) =

American basketball player (born 1983)

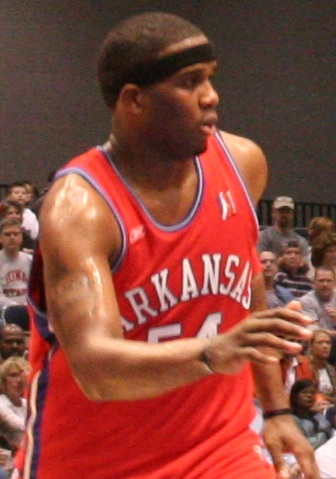
- Lang in 2006 with the Arkansas RimRockers

Personal information
- Born: October 17, 1983 (age 43) Mobile, Alabama, U.S.
- Listed height: 6 ft 9 in (2.06 m)
- Listed weight: 315 lb (143 kg)

Career information
- High school: Central Park Christian (Birmingham, Alabama)
- NBA draft: 2003: 2nd round, 48th overall pick
- Drafted by: New Orleans Hornets
- Playing career: 2004–2009
- Position: Center
- Number: 54

Career history
- 2004: Oklahoma Storm
- 2004: Asheville Altitude
- 2004–2005: Portland Reign
- 2005: Club Básquet Inca
- 2005–2006: Arkansas RimRockers
- 2006–2007: Washington Wizards
- 2006–2007: Arkansas RimRockers
- 2007–2008: Utah Flash
- 2008: Maccabi Rishon LeZion
- 2009: Utah Flash

Career highlights
- McDonald's All-American (2003)

Career statistics
- Points: 11 (1.0 ppg)
- Rebounds: 11 (1.0 rpg)
- Assists: 2 (0.2 apg)
- Stats at NBA.com
- Stats at Basketball Reference

James Lang (born October 17, 1983) is an American former professional basketball player who played in the National Basketball Association (NBA) for the Washington Wizards.

== Professional career ==
He was selected with the 19th pick of the second round (48th pick overall) of the 2003 NBA draft by the New Orleans Hornets, but was waived in December of that year after back injuries kept him sidelined and after GM Bob Bass proclaimed that Lang did not show "the potential to be put on the active roster".

Lang attended pre-season camp with the Utah Jazz in 2005 but did not make the team.

The Toronto Raptors signed Lang to a 10-day contract on March 27, 2006, and he was waived after this contract. Lang had averaged 8.3 points and 5.0 rebounds in 32 games for the Arkansas RimRockers of the NBA Developmental League during the 2006 season.

He signed two 10-day contracts with the Atlanta Hawks early in the 2006 season but did not see any game action.

On September 14, 2006, Lang was signed by the Washington Wizards. In July 2007, Lang was released by the Wizards.

Lang's final NBA game was played on January 5, 2007, in a 116–115 win over the Los Angeles Clippers where Lang only played for 42 seconds (substituting at the very end of the 4th quarter for Brendan Haywood) and recorded no stats.

He was in training camp with the Utah Flash of NBA Developmental League gearing up for the 2009–2010 season but the 26-year-old was "waived for medical reasons" on November 18, 2009.

The day after Thanksgiving in 2009, Lang suffered a stroke that left him partially paralyzed.
