= Madinah Slaise =

American basketball player (born 1978)

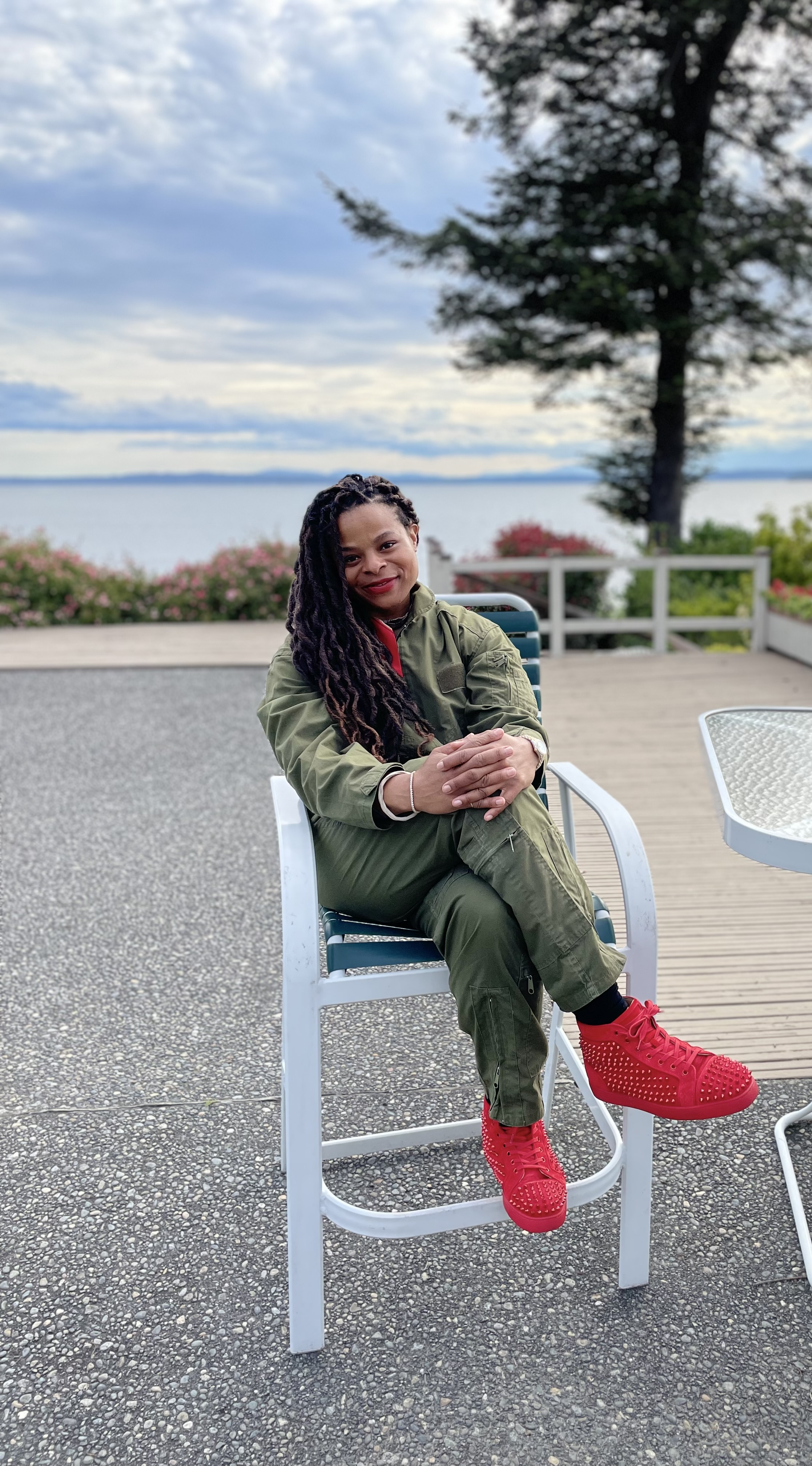

Personal information
- Born: August 19, 1978 (age 48) Lima, Ohio, U.S.
- Listed height: 5 ft 9 in (1.75 m)
- Listed weight: 175 lb (79 kg)

Career information
- College: University of Cincinnati
- WNBA draft: 2000: 2nd round, 28th overall pick
- Drafted by: Detroit Shock
- Position: Guard
- Number: 12

Career highlights
- 2x First-team All-CUSA (1999, 2000); CUSA All-Freshman Team (1997)
- Stats at Basketball Reference

Major (ret.) Madinah Slaise
- Military career
- Allegiance: United States
- Branch: United States Army; United States Air Force
- Rank: Major (retired)
- Website: https://madinahslaisemedia.org

Madinah Slaise (born August 22, 1978) is a former professional basketball player, retired United States Air Force officer, and recipient of Hall of Fame accolades for both athletic and personal achievements, including her induction into the University of Cincinnati James P. Kelly Athletic Hall of Fame in 2016 and the Lima City School District Distinguished Alumni Hall of Fame in 2017.

== Career ==
=== Basketball ===
==== College Basketball ====
Madinah (ma-Dee-na) Slaise was a four-year letterwinner at the University of Cincinnati (1996-2000). She ranks as the program's third all-time leading scorer with 1,849 points and averaged 21.8 ppg as a senior in 2000, the fourth-best single-season scoring average in UC history.

A two-time First-Team All-Conference USA selection in 1999 and 2000, she was named to the Conference USA All-Freshman Team in 1997. She earned a spot on the C-USA All-Tournament Team in 1999 and led UC in steals in each of her four seasons, grabbing 57, 45, 85 and 70 from 1997-2000, respectively.

Slaise still holds the school single-game record for free throw attempts, racking up 18 at Charlotte in 2000 and holds the UC single-season record for both free throws made (193) and attempted (242), both set in 1998-99. Slaise also holds the career marks for free throws made (503) and attempted (676) (male and female players) and ranks in UC's career top-10 in games played (t-9th/119), points (3rd/1,849), scoring average (6th/15.5), field goals made (8th/600), field goals attempted (3rd/1,602), 3-point field goals made (6th/146), 3-point field goals attempted (5th/497) and steals (2nd/256).

==== Professional Basketball ====
After graduating from the University of Cincinnati with a Bachelor of Arts in Communication, Madinah Slaise was selected by the Detroit Shock in the second round (No. 28 overall) of the 2000 WNBA draft. She played with the Shock during the 2000 season, capturing the second highest player efficiency ranking (30%) for the 2000 WNBA season. She also competed overseas in France, Switzerland and Israel while launching the Madinah Slaise Youth Basketball Camp in her hometown, Lima Ohio.

=== Later career ===
Slaise joined the United States Army following the September 11, 2001 terrorist attack and served as an enlisted Trauma Medic for three years at the Womack Army Medical Center Emergency Department.

Prior to accepting a commission with the United States Air Force, she earned an associate degree and practiced as a board certified (Medical-Surgical) Registered Nurse for several years within the civilian sector. Subsequently, accomplishing a second bachelor's degree in Nursing Science from HBCU Winston-Salem State University in 2010 (summa cum laude). She also achieved a master's degree as a Nurse Educator from Liberty University in 2016 (magna cum laude).

Madinah is an International Sports Sciences Association Certified Master Trainer, having competed as an amateur physique champion from 2010-2013. She started sports and nutrition company "Austerus FIT" in 2011, and sold it in 2016.

Slaise retired from her officership in the United States Air Force as a Major in 2018. Her career appointment summarization includes APU/PACU/CASF/Emergency Department Clinical Nurse, Medical Group & Squadron Executive Officer, Flight Nurse, and POTUS Flight Medicine Clinic Flight Commander.

=== Media Magnate: Second Act ===
Following a hall-of-fame athletic career and military tenure spanning three bipartisan presidential administrations, Madinah Slaise retired from her officership in the U.S. Air Force Nurse Corps in 2018. The digital adventures of this journalist began with an invitation to apply for a sports broadcasting internship at WCPO-TV in Cincinnati, Ohio, in 1999. By 2023, Seattleites had warmed to the freelance news producer and her on-air personality.

In March 2024, Madinah cold-pitched her eponymous Madinah In The Market (MITM) radio show to the Pike Place Market Marketing and Public Relations Department. The unprecedented series launch opened doors for independent producers while solidifying her position as a prime-time host on 91.3 KBCS-FM.

In response to sustained audience demand, MITM expanded into an editorial series captured on location, offering viewers access beyond the Pike Place Market high stalls and into conversations unfolding in real time. Produced as intimate field recordings and filmed before a live studio audience at The Rabbit Box Theatre, the broadcast reaches more than 2.5 million Puget Sound listeners each week on KBCS.

Beyond the program, Slaise's relationship with the Market received formal recognition on July 24, 2026, when the Pike Place Market Preservation and Development Authority (PDA) selected her as guest bell ringer for its morning merchant meeting. The distinction is reserved for notable civic and community leaders.

When she isn't behind the camera or cutting up in Logic Pro, Madinah maintains a strategic focus on public health. She formerly served as the Health Disparities Chair of the Seattle Mayor's Council on African American Elders (MCAAE). Her duties included advising the Mayor and government officials on the policies, practices, and programs impacting African American seniors in the metropolis.

The Cincinnati Enquirer has ranked Slaise one of the "Top 20 U.C. women's basketball players to wear the Bearcat uniform." On September 4, 2026, Madinah was enshrined on the Lima City Schools Veterans Wall of Honor in recognition of her service in the U.S. Armed Forces.
