= Marcus Campbell (basketball) =

American basketball player

Marcus Campbell (born March 11, 1982) is an American former professional basketball player.

== College career ==
Campbell played four seasons at Mississippi State from 2001 to 2005. The Bulldogs advanced to the NCAA Tournament all four years he played there. He scored a career-high 18 points over UMKC in November 2004. He finished his career with 87 blocks, ranking him ninth on the Bulldogs' all-time career blocks list.

== Professional career ==
Campbell bounced around numerous minor professional leagues in the United States upon leaving Mississippi State in 2005. His stints included time with the Tunica Gamblers (WBA), Rockford Lightning (CBA), Arkansas ArchAngels (WBA), Arkansas RimRockers (NBDL), Oklahoma Storm (USBL), Kansas Cagerz (USBL), Idaho Stampede (NBDL), and Anaheim Arsenal (NBDL). In April 2008, he joined Italian team Air Avellino.

Between October and December 2008, Campbell played for CD Villa de Los Barrios in Spain. On December 17, 2008, Campbell re-joined the Anaheim Arsenal. In December 2009, he joined the Springfield Armor following a stint in the Eastern Basketball Alliance with the Washington Madness.

During the 2010–11 season, Campbell played in France for ESSM Le Portel Côte d'Opale. He later joined the Taranaki Mountainairs for the 2011 New Zealand NBL season. For the 2011–12 season, he played in Iran for Shiraz a.s Pipe.

For the 2012–13 season, Campbell moved to Qatar to play for Al Rayan. However, in November 2012, he attempted to board a plane in Qatar and was denied exit from the country. Campbell was trying to get to his new job in Cyprus after his Qatari team failed to honor his contract. Campbell's agent, Bill McCandless, said "[Campbell] plays for a team for 50 days, makes next to nothing, gets evicted and tries to take a plane to a new job in a new country and he can't get out?". To leave the country, Campbell was forced to sign a $20,000 settlement, despite requesting the team to pay him a $25,000 severance penalty after Al Rayan paid him just $1,430 for his 50 days with the team out of the $10,000-per-month salary he had signed for.

Campbell finished his career in October 2013 after a six-game stint in Uruguay with Club Atlético Bohemios.
