= Astou Ndiaye-Diatta =

Senegalese basketball player (born 1973)

Personal information
- Born: November 5, 1973 (age 52) Kaolack, Senegal
- Listed height: 6 ft 3 in (1.91 m)
- Listed weight: 182 lb (83 kg)

Career information
- College: SNU (1993–1997)
- WNBA draft: 1999: 4th round, 41st overall pick
- Drafted by: Detroit Shock
- Playing career: 1997–2007
- Position: Center

Career history
- 1997–1998: Seattle Reign
- 1999–2003: Detroit Shock
- 2004: Indiana Fever
- 2006: Houston Comets
- 2007: Seattle Storm
- Stats at Basketball Reference

Astou Ndiaye-Diatta (born 5 November 1973) is a Senegalese former women's basketball player. She is currently an assistant coach at Utah State University in the United States.

A 1997 cum laude graduate of Southern Nazarene University, she was selected by the Detroit Shock in the Women's National Basketball Association during its 1999 draft in the second round and was the 22nd pick overall. She spent five seasons with the Shock, before spending the 2004 season with the Indiana Fever, the 2006 season with the Houston Comets, and the 2007 season with the Seattle Storm.

In July 2008, she was named as an assistant coach at Utah State University.
