= Mike Mercer (basketball) =

American basketball player (born 1986)

Personal information
- Born: September 29, 1986 (age 40) Anaheim, California
- Listed height: 192 cm (6 ft 4 in)
- Listed weight: 88 kg (194 lb)

Career information
- High school: South Gwinnett (Snellville, Georgia)
- College: Georgia (2005–2007); South Florida (2008–2010)
- NBA draft: 2010: undrafted
- Playing career: 2010–2014
- Position: Shooting guard

Career history
- 2011: Halifax Rainmen
- 2011–2012: BG Illertal
- 2013–2014: Geelong Supercats

Career highlights
- All-SEABL Team (2013); SEC All-Freshman Team (2006); Fourth-team Parade All-American (2005)

Michael Anthony Mercer Jr. (born September 29, 1986) is an American former professional basketball player. He played college basketball for the University of Georgia and the University of South Florida.

== Early life ==
Born in Anaheim, California, Mercer grew up in Snellville, Georgia, where he was a teammate of former NBA player Lou Williams at South Gwinnett High School and with the AAU's Georgia Stars. As a junior at South Gwinnett in 2003–04, he averaged 18.1 points per game and helped the school go 31–2 and win the AAAAA championship.

As a senior in 2004–05, Mercer averaged 19.8 points, 8.1 assists and 6.0 rebounds per game, helping South Gwinnett to a 28–3 record and the quarterfinals of the Georgia Class 5A state tournament.

== College career ==
=== Georgia ===
As a freshman at Georgia in 2005–06, Mercer averaged 11 points and three rebounds per game and was named to the Coaches' SEC All-Freshman team. He had 17 double-digit scoring games, captured one Freshman-of-the-Week award, and ranked eighth in the SEC in steals at 1.71 per game.

As a sophomore in 2006–07, Mercer started all 23 games for Georgia before suffering a right ACL injury that forced him to miss the final 10 games of the season. He was the second leading scorer on the team at 13.6 points per game. Prior to his injury, Mercer was leading the team in scoring and minutes played and was ranked 18th in the SEC in scoring, 14th in assists (3.6), eighth in steals (1.70) and 13th in assist/turnover ratio (1.43). He earned SEC Player of the Week honors once and came within two rebounds against Jacksonville of becoming first Bulldogs player in history to achieve a triple-double.

On March 15, 2007, Mercer underwent reconstructive knee surgery to repair the torn ligament.

On October 11, 2007, Mercer was suspended by the University of Georgia for violating the school's new class attendance policy for student-athletes. His suspension cost him the first 15 games of the 2007–08 season. Mercer was later dismissed from the program on November 19, 2007, for "being a disruption," said Georgia coach Dennis Felton at the time.

=== South Florida ===
On November 27, 2007, Mercer transferred to South Florida and subsequently redshirted the 2007–08 season due to NCAA transfer regulations.

Mercer became eligible to play for South Florida in December 2008, making his debut for the Bulls on December 14 against Niagara. He competed in four games, starting two, before suffering a season-ending knee injury on December 21 against Wright State.

While out injured, Mercer again ran into trouble. On January 23, 2009, he was arrested for the second time in four months: the first being in September 2008 for public consumption of alcohol, and the second being for marijuana possession. Arrested with him was teammate Anthony Crater, who were both charged with misdemeanor possession of marijuana. Both were suspended from the team indefinitely.

It seemed his career, at Georgia and USF, would be remembered for injuries and dismissals, and for the disappointment of missed opportunities. But coach Stan Heath kept Mercer on scholarship, hoping he would stick around and earn his degree, and after Mercer graduated in August 2009 and fulfilled the legal requirements of a pretrial intervention program to get a misdemeanor drug charge dropped, Heath took a chance by allowing Mercer back on the team for the 2009–10 season. Heath's decision paid dividends, as Mercer became a key part of the Bulls' emergence in 2009–10. In February 2010, Mercer expressed how grateful he was to be part of a team making a run at the NCAA Tournament: "Coming back has been a blessing. I'm grateful that Coach Heath and the coaching staff gave me another chance, and that's why I play my heart out every game. When you have a coach that's willing to go out on a limb for you, it makes you want to work that much harder for them."

In 2009–10, Mercer played in all 33 games for the Bulls, starting 30 of them. He ranked fifth on the team with 9.2 points per game while also adding 4.5 rebounds in 28.6 minutes per contest. He also finished third on the team with 48 assists and second with 44 steals. On January 5, 2010, he had his first career double-double with 10 points and a career-high 10 rebounds against Notre Dame. During the season, he had two 19-point games, a season high.

After earning a degree in criminology, Mercer began working on a second degree in communications.

== Professional career ==
In November 2010, Mercer joined the Halifax Rainmen as a non-contracted training camp invite. He helped the team go 3–1 over four preseason games between December 10 and 19, and made his regular season debut for the club in the season opener on January 2, 2011, scoring 14 points in a 109–99 win over the Vermont Frost Heaves. Mercer left the team on February 15 because of undisclosed family reasons. Team Owner Andre Levingston said Mercer returned to Atlanta to be with his wife and young child. His departure left a gaping hole at the Rainmen's two spot, where Mercer averaged 14.5 points per game, second on the team and 15th in the Premier Basketball League.

In November 2011, Mercer moved to Weißenhorn, Germany to play for BG Illertal of the German ProB. In 15 games for the club throughout the 2011–12 season, he averaged 16.5 points, 3.6 rebounds, 2.3 assists and 1.7 steals per game.

In December 2012, Mercer signed with the Geelong Supercats for the 2013 SEABL season. Mercer had a standout year with Geelong, finishing top ten in the league in points scored, assists and steals. In 29 games for the club in 2013, he averaged 20.1 points, 5.0 rebounds and 4.8 assists per game. He subsequently earned All-SEABL Team honors.

In October 2013, Mercer trialled with the Wollongong Hawks of the National Basketball League, but was ultimately unsuccessful in garnering a contract.

Mercer returned to the Geelong Supercats for the 2014 SEABL season, but a mid-season right Achilles tendon injury ended his campaign after just 15 games. He helped the Supercats go 14–1 with averages of 20.1 points, 4.6 rebounds and 3.7 assists per game.
