= 2009–10 Philadelphia 76ers season =

NBA professional basketball team season

- Head coach: Eddie Jordan
- General manager: Ed Stefanski
- Owners: Comcast Spectacor
- Arena: Wachovia Center

Results
- Record: 27–55 (.329)
- Place: Division: 4th (Atlantic); Conference: 12th (Eastern)
- Playoff finish: Did not qualify
- Stats at Basketball Reference

Local media
- Television: CSN Philadelphia (71 games); Comcast Network Philadelphia (10 games)
- Radio: WIP; WPHT

The 2009–10 Philadelphia 76ers season was the seventy-first season of the franchise and the sixty-first in the National Basketball Association (NBA).

== Background ==
This season became hopeful on December 2 when Allen Iverson returned to the team for his second stint with the Sixers; however, that hope was short lived as he left the team in February to attend to his then four-year-old daughter Messiah's health issues. Although Iverson was selected to play in what could have been his eleventh consecutive All-Star Game, he backed out for personal reasons. In March, it was announced that Iverson would not return to the 76ers for the rest of the season.

The Sixers season ended with a disappointing 27–55 record. After the season, Eddie Jordan was fired; he was subsequently replaced by former Sixer Doug Collins for the next season. Iverson later played overseas.

== Key dates ==
- June 25 – The 2009 NBA draft took place in New York City.
- July 8 – The free agency period started.
- June 1 – Eddie Jordan was named head coach of the Philadelphia 76ers.
- July 24 – After two and a half seasons with the Sixers, free agent point guard Andre Miller signed a contract with the Portland Trail Blazers.
- October 6 – The Sixers' pre season will start with a game against the Toronto Raptors.
- October 28 – The Sixers' regular season will start with a game against the Orlando Magic.
- December 2 – The Sixers' signed free agent guard Allen Iverson to a one-year contract.

== Off-season ==
=== 2009 NBA draft ===
On June 25, the Sixers selected guard Jrue Holiday from UCLA with the 17th overall pick. On July 21 it was announced that Holiday put pen to paper on his rookie deal with the 76ers.

==== Draft picks ====
Round	Pick	Player	Position	Nationality	College
1	17	Jrue Holiday	Guard	United States	UCLA

=== Free agency ===
The Sixers headed into the off-season with free agents Royal Ivey, Donyell Marshall, Andre Miller, Theo Ratliff and Kareem Rush.

On June 15 Royal Ivey declined his player option with the team and Ivey became an unrestricted free agent.

After almost a month of contract negotiations with Andre Miller, the Sixers' management withdrew its contract offer; Miller then went on to sign with the Portland Trail Blazers on July 24. Veteran center Theo Ratliff signed with the San Antonio Spurs on the same day.

It was confirmed on August 6 by Sixers general manager Ed Stefanski and a player's agent that the Sixers would not re-sign Donyell Marshall.

On August 4, it was announced that the Sixers had come to terms on a one-year contract with Yugoslavian born center Primož Brezec. Brezec had last played in the NBA during the 2007–08 season with the Toronto Raptors.

After Royal Ivey had declined his player option on June 15, it was announced by the Sixers on August 10 that it had come to terms with Ivey.

On September 15, the Sixers signed free agent swingman Rodney Carney. Carney had previously played with the Sixers from 2006 to 2008, but was traded to the Minnesota Timberwolves before the start of the 2008–09 season.

== Roster ==
2009–10 Philadelphia 76ers roster
Players

Pos.	No.	Player	Height	Weight	DOB	From
PF	42	Elton Brand	6 ft 9 in (2.06 m)	275 lb (125 kg)	1979-03-11	Duke
SG	25	Rodney Carney	6 ft 7 in (2.01 m)	205 lb (93 kg)	1984-04-15	Memphis
C	1	Samuel Dalembert	6 ft 11 in (2.11 m)	250 lb (113 kg)	1981-05-10	Seton Hall
C	8	Francisco Elson	7 ft 0 in (2.13 m)	235 lb (107 kg)	1976-02-28	California
SG	33	Willie Green	6 ft 4 in (1.93 m)	200 lb (91 kg)	1981-07-28	Detroit Mercy
PG	11	Jrue Holiday	6 ft 4 in (1.93 m)	205 lb (93 kg)	1990-06-12	UCLA
SF	9	Andre Iguodala	6 ft 6 in (1.98 m)	207 lb (94 kg)	1984-01-28	Arizona
SG	3	Allen Iverson (L)	6 ft 0 in (1.83 m)	165 lb (75 kg)	1975-06-07	Georgetown
SF	72	Jason Kapono	6 ft 8 in (2.03 m)	213 lb (97 kg)	1981-02-04	UCLA
SG	20	Jodie Meeks	6 ft 4 in (1.93 m)	208 lb (94 kg)	1987-08-21	Kentucky
PF	14	Jason Smith	7 ft 0 in (2.13 m)	240 lb (109 kg)	1986-03-02	Colorado State
C	16	Marreese Speights	6 ft 10 in (2.08 m)	245 lb (111 kg)	1987-08-04	Florida
PG	23	Louis Williams	6 ft 1 in (1.85 m)	175 lb (79 kg)	1986-10-27	South Gwinnett (HS)
PF	21	Thaddeus Young (injured)	6 ft 8 in (2.03 m)	220 lb (100 kg)	1988-06-21	Georgia Tech

Coaches
Head coach
- Eddie Jordan
Assistant(s)
- Jim Lynam
- Aaron McKie
- Mike O'Koren

Legend
- (DP) Unsigned draft pick
- (FA) Free agent
- (S) Suspended
- (L) On leave from the team
- Injured

Roster
Updated: March 2, 2010

=== Roster notes ===
- Shooting guard Allen Iverson played twenty-eight games (his last game being on February 20, 2010) but missed the rest of the season to be with his family as they deal with an undisclosed illness of his four-year-old daughter, Messiah. Iverson was released from the team on March 2, 2010.
- Power forward Thaddeus Young played sixty-seven games (his last game being on March 15, 2010) but missed the remainder of the season due to a right thumb fracture.

== Pre-season ==
2009 Pre-season game log: 5–2–0 (Home: 2–1–0; Road: 3–1–0)
#	Date	Visitor	Score	Home	OT	Attendance	Record	Recap
1	October 6 (in London, Ontario)	Toronto Raptors	98–107	Philadelphia 76ers		7,213	1–0	W 107–98
2	October 7	Philadelphia 76ers	84–79	Toronto Raptors		11,974	2–0	W 84–79
3	October 9	New Jersey Nets	92–93	Philadelphia 76ers		12,309	3–0	W 93–92
4	October 13	Philadelphia 76ers	93–85	New York Knicks		16,377	4–0	W 93–85
5	October 16	Philadelphia 76ers	113–115	Phoenix Suns		15,791	4–1	L 113–115
6	October 18 (in Monterrey, Mexico)	Philadelphia 76ers	116–94	Phoenix Suns		8,562	5–1	W 116–94
7	October 20	Washington Wizards	90–89	Philadelphia 76ers		10,972	5–2	L 89–90
8	October 23 (in Queens, New York)	Philadelphia 76ers	88–110	New Jersey Nets		3,284	5–3	L 88–110

== Regular season ==
=== Standings ===
Atlantic Division	W	L	PCT	GB	Home	Road	Div
y-Boston Celtics	50	32	.610	–	24–17	26–15	13–3
Toronto Raptors	40	42	.488	10	25–16	15–26	11–5
New York Knicks	29	53	.354	21	18–23	11–30	6–10
Philadelphia 76ers	27	55	.329	23	12–29	15–26	7–9
New Jersey Nets	12	70	.146	38	8–33	4–37	3–13

#	Eastern Conference				
#	Team	W	L	PCT	GB
1	z-Cleveland Cavaliers	61	21	.744	–
2	y-Orlando Magic	59	23	.720	2
3	x-Atlanta Hawks	53	29	.646	8
4	y-Boston Celtics	50	32	.610	11
5	x-Miami Heat	47	35	.573	14
6	x-Milwaukee Bucks	46	36	.561	15
7	x-Charlotte Bobcats	44	38	.537	17
8	x-Chicago Bulls	41	41	.500	20
9	Toronto Raptors	40	42	.488	21
10	Indiana Pacers	32	50	.390	29
11	New York Knicks	29	53	.354	32
12	Philadelphia 76ers	27	55	.329	34
13	Detroit Pistons	27	55	.329	34
14	Washington Wizards	26	56	.317	35
15	New Jersey Nets	12	70	.146	49

=== Game log ===
2009–10 game log
Total: 27–55 (Home: 12–29; Road: 15–26)
October: 2–1 (home: 1–0; road: 1–1)

Game	Date	Team	Score	High points	High rebounds	High assists	Location Attendance	Record
1	October 28	@ Orlando	L 106–120	Marreese Speights (26)	Elton Brand (6)	Andre Iguodala (6)	Amway Arena; 17,461	0–1
2	October 30	Milwaukee	W 99–86	Andre Iguodala (19)	Samuel Dalembert (12)	Andre Iguodala (7)	Wachovia Center; 14,638	1-1
3	October 31	@ New York	W 141–127 (OT)	Andre Iguodala (32)	Andre Iguodala (11)	Andre Iguodala (8)	Madison Square Garden; 19,763	2–1

November : 3–12 (home: 2–5; road: 1–7)

Game	Date	Team	Score	High points	High rebounds	High assists	Location Attendance	Record
4	November 3	Boston	L 74–105	Andre Iguodala (17)	Marreese Speights (9)	Louis Williams (5)	Wachovia Center; 11,251	2-2
5	November 6	New Jersey	W 97–94	Louis Williams (18)	Louis Williams (9)	Louis Williams (6)	Wachovia Center; 10,054	3–2
6	November 8	@ Detroit	L 81–88	Andre Iguodala (24)	Elton Brand (9)	Louis Williams (5)	Palace of Auburn Hills; 17,187	3-3
7	November 9	Phoenix	L 115–119	Andre Iguodala (24)	Andre Iguodala (9)	Thaddeus Young, Louis Williams, Samuel Dalembert, Willie Green (3)	Wachovia Center; 10,205	3–4
8	November 11	@ New Jersey	W 82–79	Thaddeus Young (20)	Andre Iguodala, Marreese Speights (9)	Louis Williams (7)	Izod Center; 10,714	4-4
9	November 13	Utah	L 90–112	Thaddeus Young (17)	Andre Iguodala (7)	Andre Iguodala (10)	Wachovia Center; 10,738	4–5
10	November 14	@ Chicago	L 88–94	Andre Iguodala (24)	Samuel Dalembert (12)	Andre Iguodala (6)	United Center; 21,837	4–6
11	November 18	Charlotte	W 86–84	Andre Iguodala (25)	Elton Brand (11)	Louis Williams (6)	Wachovia Center; 11,585	5–6
12	November 20	Memphis	L 97–102	Louis Williams (31)	Elton Brand (6)	Andre Iguodala (9)	Wachovia Center; 14,269	5–7
13	November 21	@ Cleveland	L 78–83	Louis Williams (22)	Elton Brand (14)	Andre Iguodala (7)	Quicken Loans Arena; 20,562	5–8
14	November 24	@ Washington	L 107–108	Louis Williams (26)	Samuel Dalembert (9)	Louis Williams, Andre Iguodala (5)	Verizon Center; 14,485	5–9
15	November 25	@ Boston	L 110–113	Andre Iguodala (25)	Andre Iguodala, Samuel Dalembert (9)	Andre Iguodala (9)	TD Garden; 18,624	5–10
16	November 27	Atlanta	L 86–100	Thaddeus Young (22)	Andre Iguodala (9)	Andre Iguodala (8)	Wachovia Center; 12,984	5–11
17	November 29	@ San Antonio	L 89–97	Andre Iguodala (21)	Samuel Dalembert (14)	Andre Iguodala (7)	AT&T Center; 17,161	5–12
18	November 30	@ Dallas	L 102–104	Willie Green (23)	Samuel Dalembert (19)	Andre Iguodala, Jrue Holiday (4)	American Airlines Center; 19,783	5–13

December : 4–10 (home: 1–5; road: 3–5)

Game	Date	Team	Score	High points	High rebounds	High assists	Location Attendance	Record
19	December 2	@ Oklahoma City	L 106–117	Andre Iguodala (28)	Andre Iguodala, Samuel Dalembert (6)	Willie Green (6)	Ford Center; 17,332	5–14
20	December 5	@ Charlotte	L 105–106	Willie Green (26)	Andre Iguodala, Thaddeus Young (11)	Andre Iguodala (7)	Time Warner Cable Arena; 13,352	5–15
21	December 7	Denver	L 83–93	Andre Iguodala (31)	Samuel Dalembert (15)	Allen Iverson (6)	Wachovia Center; 20,664	5–16
22	December 9	Detroit	L 86–90	Andre Iguodala (18)	Samuel Dalembert (11)	Andre Iguodala (9)	Wachovia Center; 12,136	5–17
23	December 11	Houston	L 91–96	Andre Iguodala (24)	Samuel Dalembert (14)	Willie Green (5)	Wachovia Center; 13,991	5–18
24	December 14	Golden State	W 117–101	Thaddeus Young (26)	Thaddeus Young (14)	Jrue Holiday (6)	Wachovia Center; 12,795	6–18
25	December 16	Cleveland	L 101–108	Andre Iguodala (26)	Thaddeus Young (10)	Jrue Holiday (9)	Wachovia Center; 19,517	6–19
26	December 18	@ Boston	W 98–97	Elton Brand (23)	Marreese Speights (10)	Jrue Holiday (7)	TD Garden; 18,624	7–19
27	December 19	LA Clippers	L 107–112 (OT)	Marreese Speights (28)	Andre Iguodala, Marreese Speights (9)	Andre Iguodala, Jrue Holiday (7)	Wachovia Center; 13,752	7-20
28	December 22	@ Washington	L 98–105	Elton Brand (18)	Elton Brand (12)	Andre Iguodala (7)	Verizon Center; 15,435	7-21
29	December 26	@ Utah	L 76–97	Thaddeus Young (20)	Samuel Dalembert (9)	Andre Iguodala, Willie Green (3)	EnergySolutions Arena; 19,911	7-22
30	December 28	@ Portland	W 104–93	Elton Brand (25)	Elton Brand (9)	Andre Iguodala (9)	Rose Garden Arena; 20,640	8-22
31	December 30	@ Sacramento	W 116–106	Louis Williams (20)	Andre Iguodala, Thaddeus Young, Samuel Dalembert (7)	Andre Iguodala (9)	ARCO Arena; 13,156	9-22
32	December 31	@ LA Clippers	L 88–104	Louis Williams (19)	Samuel Dalembert (9)	Andre Iguodala (7)	Staples Center; 15,257	9–23

January : 7–8 (home: 3–6; road: 4–2)

Game	Date	Team	Score	High points	High rebounds	High assists	Location Attendance	Record
33	January 3	@ Denver	W 108–105	Allen Iverson (17)	Andre Iguodala, Elton Brand (7)	Allen Iverson (7)	Pepsi Center; 19,155	10–23
34	January 5	Washington	L 97–104	Andre Iguodala, Samuel Dalembert (20)	Samuel Dalembert (20)	Andre Iguodala (8)	Wachovia Center; 11,822	10–24
35	January 8	Toronto	L 106–108	Louis Williams (23)	Thaddeus Young (13)	Andre Iguodala (9)	Wachovia Center; 15,264	10–25
36	January 9	@ Detroit	W 104–94	Elton Brand (25)	Samuel Dalembert (9)	Jrue Holiday (6)	The Palace of Auburn Hills; 19,784	11–25
37	January 11	New Orleans	W 96–92	Elton Brand, Andre Iguodala (18)	Samuel Dalembert (14)	Andre Iguodala (8)	Wachovia Center; 11,518	12–25
38	January 13	New York	L 92–93	Allen Iverson (16)	Samuel Dalembert (21)	Andre Iguodala (8)	Wachovia Center; 12,444	12–26
39	January 15	Sacramento	W 98–86	Thaddeus Young (20)	Samuel Dalembert (12)	Andre Iguodala (7)	Wachovia Center; 16,767	13–26
40	January 18	@ Minnesota	L 103–108 (OT)	Andre Iguodala (17)	Samuel Dalembert (10)	Allen Iverson (9)	Target Center; 14,637	13–27
41	January 20	Portland	L 90–98	Andre Iguodala (23)	Samuel Dalembert (15)	Louis Williams (7)	Wachovia Center; 12,607	13–28
42	January 22	Dallas	W 92–81	Thaddeus Young (22)	Samuel Dalembert (10)	Andre Iguodala (8)	Wachovia Center; 17,647	14–28
43	January 23	@ Indiana	W 107–97	Elton Brand (23)	Samuel Dalembert (12)	Andre Iguodala, Elton Brand (4)	Conseco Fieldhouse; 16,074	15–28
44	January 25	Indiana	L 98–109	Andre Iguodala (22)	Samuel Dalembert (13)	Allen Iverson (6)	Wachovia Center; 10,579	15–29
45	January 27	@ Milwaukee	L 88–91	Elton Brand (26)	Samuel Dalembert (11)	Andre Iguodala, Allen Iverson (4)	Bradley Center; 12,685	15–30
46	January 29	LA Lakers	L 91–99	Allen Iverson (23)	Samuel Dalembert (12)	Andre Iguodala, Allen Iverson (4)	Wachovia Center; 20,809	15–31
47	January 31	@ New Jersey	W 83–79	Andre Iguodala (14)	Samuel Dalembert (11)	Louis Williams (5)	Izod Center; 11,576	16–31

February : 6–5 (home: 3–1; road: 3–4)

Game	Date	Team	Score	High points	High rebounds	High assists	Location Attendance	Record
48	February 3	Chicago	W 106–103 (OT)	Elton Brand (26)	Samuel Dalembert (13)	Andre Iguodala (8)	Wachovia Center; 13,295	17–31
49	February 5	@ New Orleans	W 101–94	Thaddeus Young (19)	Samuel Dalembert (16)	Andre Iguodala (7)	New Orleans Arena; 15,162	18–31
50	February 6	@ Houston	W 102–95	Thaddeus Young (17)	Andre Iguodala, Samuel Dalembert (10)	Andre Iguodala (6)	Toyota Center; 17,415	19–31
51	February 9	Minnesota	W 119–97	Andre Iguodala (24)	Thaddeus Young (8)	Louis Williams (7)	Wachovia Center; 11,038	20–31
52	February 10	@ Toronto	L 93–104	Louis Williams (26)	Andre Iguodala (8)	Jrue Holiday (6)	Air Canada Centre; 16,651	20–32
53	February 16	Miami	L 78–105	Thaddeus Young (16)	Samuel Dalembert (10)	Andre Iguodala (7)	Wachovia Center; 15,602	20–33
54	February 19	San Antonio	W 106–94	Louis Williams, Andre Iguodala (20)	Andre Iguodala (9)	Andre Iguodala (8)	Wachovia Center; 16,376	21–33
55	February 20	@ Chicago	L 90–122	Andre Iguodala (23)	Elton Brand (13)	Andre Iguodala (5)	United Center; 22,147	21–34
56	February 23	@ Golden State	W 110–102	Louis Williams (26)	Samuel Dalembert (11)	Louis Williams, Andre Iguodala (7)	Oracle Arena; 17,115	22–34
57	February 24	@ Phoenix	L 95–106	Andre Iguodala (20)	Rodney Carney (8)	Andre Iguodala (6)	US Airways Center; 17,765	22–35
58	February 26	@ LA Lakers	L 90–99	Samuel Dalembert (24)	Samuel Dalembert (11)	Andre Iguodala (10)	Staples Center; 18,997	22–36

March : 4–13 (home: 2–8; road: 2–5)

Game	Date	Team	Score	High points	High rebounds	High assists	Location Attendance	Record
59	March 1	Orlando	L 105–126	Jrue Holiday (23)	Samuel Dalembert (11)	Louis Williams (7)	Wachovia Center; 15,817	22–37
60	March 3	@ Atlanta	L 93–112	Louis Williams (30)	Samuel Dalembert (10)	Andre Iguodala (7)	Philips Arena; 15,408	22–38
61	March 5	Boston	L 86–96	Louis Williams (22)	Samuel Dalembert (8)	Andre Iguodala (9)	Wachovia Center; 19,008	22–39
62	March 7	@ Toronto	W 114–101	Thaddeus Young (32)	Elton Brand (9)	Andre Iguodala (10)	Air Canada Centre; 18,736	23–39
63	March 9	@ Indiana	L 96–107	Jrue Holiday (21)	Samuel Dalembert (11)	Andre Iguodala, Jrue Holiday (4)	Conseco Fieldhouse; 11,535	23–40
64	March 10	Charlotte	L 87–102	Rodney Carney (14)	Samuel Dalembert (10)	Jrue Holiday (8)	Wachovia Center; 11,358	23–41
65	March 12	Cleveland	L 95–100	Andre Iguodala (30)	Samuel Dalembert (12)	Jrue Holiday (8)	Wachovia Center; 20,433	23–42
66	March 14	@ Miami	L 91–104	Jason Kapono (17)	Elton Brand (10)	Andre Iguodala (9)	AmericanAirlines Arena; 18,129	23–43
67	March 15	New York	L 84–94	Jrue Holiday (18)	Samuel Dalembert (18)	Jrue Holiday (6)	Wachovia Center; 13,563	23–44
68	March 17	New Jersey	W 108–97	Andre Iguodala (20)	Samuel Dalembert (9)	Andre Iguodala (8)	Wachovia Center; 11,618	24–44
69	March 19	@ New York	L 88–92	Elton Brand (19)	Samuel Dalembert, Jrue Holiday (8)	Willie Green (4)	Madison Square Garden; 19,763	24–45
70	March 20	Chicago	L 84–98	Marreese Speights (17)	Marreese Speights (11)	Willie Green, Louis Williams (4)	Wachovia Center; 16,098	24–46
71	March 22	Orlando	L 93–109	Elton Brand, Andre Iguodala (23)	Samuel Dalembert (14)	Jrue Holiday (7)	Wachovia Center; 13,995	24–47
72	March 24	@ Milwaukee	W 101–86	Willie Green (16)	Samuel Dalembert (10)	Jrue Holiday (7)	Bradley Center; 12,675	25–47
73	March 26	Atlanta	W 105–98	Andre Iguodala (25)	Andre Iguodala (10)	Jrue Holiday (12)	Wachovia Center; 13,293	26–47
74	March 30	Oklahoma City	L 93–111	Elton Brand (22)	Marreese Speights (8)	Andre Iguodala (8)	Wachovia Center; 14,809	26–48
75	March 31	@ Charlotte	L 84–103	Andre Iguodala (14)	Samuel Dalembert (9)	Jrue Holiday (6)	Time Warner Cable Arena; 14,139	26–49

April : 1–6 (home: 0–4; road: 1–2)

Game	Date	Team	Score	High points	High rebounds	High assists	Location Attendance	Record
76	April 3	Toronto	L 123–128 (OT)	Andre Iguodala (33)	Samuel Dalembert (11)	Andre Iguodala (11)	Wachovia Center; 13,430	26–50
77	April 6	Detroit	L 103–124	Marreese Speights (21)	Marreese Speights (6)	Jrue Holiday (9)	Wachovia Center; 13,832	26–51
78	April 7	@ Miami	L 95–99	Samuel Dalembert (19)	Samuel Dalembert (16)	Jrue Holiday, Andre Iguodala (6)	AmericanAirlines Arena; 18,221	26–52
79	April 9	Milwaukee	L 90–95	Andre Iguodala (21)	Samuel Dalembert (15)	Jrue Holiday (8)	Wachovia Center; 14,217	26–53
80	April 10	@ Memphis	W 120–101	Marreese Speights (22)	Samuel Dalembert (12)	Louis Williams (9)	FedExForum; 15,936	27–53
81	April 12	Miami	L 105–107	Jason Kapono (24)	Samuel Dalembert (11)	Jrue Holiday (13)	Wachovia Center; 17,401	27–54
82	April 14	@ Orlando	L 111–125	Marreese Speights (23)	Marreese Speights (8)	Louis Williams (9)	Amway Arena; 17,461	27–55

2009–10 season schedule

== Player statistics ==
Legend
GP	Games played	GS	Games started	MPG	Minutes per game
FG%	Field-goal percentage	3P%	3-point field-goal percentage	FT%	Free-throw percentage
RPG	Rebounds per game	APG	Assists per game	SPG	Steals per game
BPG	Blocks per game	PPG	Points per game

=== Season ===
Player	GP	GS	MPG	FG%	3P%	FT%	RPG	APG	SPG	BPG	PPG
Elton Brand	76	57	30.2	.480	.000	.738	6.1	1.4	1.1	1.0	13.1
Rodney Carney	68	0	12.6	.401	.304	.825	2.0	.5	.4	.3	4.7
Samuel Dalembert	82	80	25.9	.545	.000	.729	9.6	.8	.5	1.8	8.1
Francisco Elson	1	0	4.0	.500	.000	.000	1.0	.0	.0	.0	2.0
Willie Green	73	18	21.3	.457	.346	.833	1.8	2.1	.4	.2	8.7
Jrue Holiday	73	51	24.2	.442	.390	.756	2.6	3.8	1.1	.2	8.0
Andre Iguodala	82	82	38.9	.443	.310	.733	6.5	5.8	1.7	.7	17.1
Jason Kapono	57	12	17.1	.419	.368	.600	1.2	.7	.4	.1	5.7
Jodie Meeks	19	0	12.3	.440	.380	.722	1.4	.9	.3	.0	5.9
Jason Smith	56	2	11.8	.431	.345	.690	2.4	.6	.4	.5	3.4
Marreese Speights	62	1	16.4	.477	.000	.745	4.1	.6	.5	.6	8.6
Louis Williams	64	38	29.9	.470	.340	.824	2.9	4.2	1.2	.2	14.0
Thaddeus Young	67	45	32.0	.470	.348	.691	5.2	1.4	1.2	.2	13.8

== Transactions ==
=== Overview ===
Players Added

Via draft

- Jrue Holiday

Via trade

- Francisco Elson
- Jason Kapono
- Jodie Meeks

Via free agency

- Primož Brezec
- Rodney Carney
- Allen Iverson
Players Lost

Via trade

- Primož Brezec
- Reggie Evans
- Royal Ivey

Via free agency

- Donyell Marshall
- Andre Miller
- Theo Ratliff

Waived

=== Trades ===
June 9, 2009
To Philadelphia 76ers

- Jason Kapono
To Toronto Raptors

- Reggie Evans

=== Free agents ===
==== Additions ====
Player	Signed	Former team
Primož Brezec	August 4	Lottomatica Virtus Roma
Rodney Carney	September 15	Minnesota Timberwolves
Allen Iverson	December 2	Memphis Grizzlies

==== Subtractions ====
Player		New team
Andre Miller	July 24	Portland Trail Blazers
Theo Ratliff	July 24	San Antonio Spurs
Donyell Marshall	August 6	Retired
