= Stephen Adegoke =

American football player and coach

Houston Texans
- Title: Safeties coach

Personal information
- Listed height: 6 ft 0 in (1.83 m)
- Listed weight: 210 lb (95 kg)

Career information
- Position: Safety
- High school: South Gwinnett (Snellville, Georgia)
- College: San Diego Mesa (2014–2015); Mississippi State (2016–2018)

Career history
- Florida (2019–2020) Graduate assistant; Michigan (2021) Graduate assistant; San Francisco 49ers (2022) Defensive quality control coach; Houston Texans (2023–present) Safeties coach

Stephen Adegoke is an American football coach who is currently the safeties coach for the Houston Texans of the National Football League (NFL).

== Playing career ==
Adegoke started his career in 2014 at San Diego Mesa where he played for two seasons. In 2016, Adegoke decided to transfer to play for the Mississippi State Bulldogs. In Adegoke's career with the Bulldogs he played in 16 games where he notched 14 tackles, two pass deflections, an interception, and a forced fumble.

== Coaching career ==
Adegoke got his first career coaching job in 2019 as a graduate assistant for the Florida Gators. In 2021, Adegoke decided to join the Michigan Wolverines as graduate assistant where he worked with the team's defensive backs. Adegoke got his first NFL coaching job in 2022 as he was hired by the San Francisco 49ers as a defensive quality control coach. In 2023, Adegoke was hired by the Houston Texans to coach the team's safeties. In Adegoke's first year with the Texans he helped them finish 23rd in pass coverage as they totaled 16 interceptions, while also helping developing played such as Derek Stingley, Jalen Pitre, and Jimmie Ward. After the 2023 NFL season it was reported that, Adegoke decided to return to Michigan as the team's defensive backs coach. However, just a few days later, Adegoke decided to turn down the Michigan job and return to the Houston Texans as the team's safeties coach.
