= Jonathan Krause =

Jonathan Krause may refer to:

- Jon Krause (born 1981), Australian politician
- Jonathan Krause (American football) (born 1992), American football wide receiver
