= Jonathan Krause (American football) =

American football player and coach (born 1992)

Miami Dolphins
- Title: Assistant wide receivers coach

Personal information
- Born: January 18, 1992 (age 34); San Bernardino, Florida, U.S.
- Listed height: 5 ft 11 in (1.80 m)
- Listed weight: 190 lb (86 kg)

Career information
- Position: Wide receiver (No. 10)
- High school: South Gwinnett (Snellville, Georgia)
- College: Vanderbilt
- NFL draft: 2014: undrafted

Career history

Playing
- Cleveland Browns (2014); New England Patriots (2014–2015); Philadelphia Eagles (2015); Tampa Bay Buccaneers (2016)*; San Diego Chargers (2016)*; Tampa Bay Buccaneers (2016)*; Tennessee Titans (2016–2017)*
- * Offseason or practice squad member only

Coaching
- Vanderbilt (2017) Volunteer coach; Oregon (2018–2020) Graduate assistant; UNLV (2021–2022) Wide receivers coach; San Diego State (2023) Wide receivers coach; Miami Dolphins (2024) Offensive assistant; Miami Dolphins (2025–present) Assistant wide receivers coach

Awards and highlights
- Super Bowl champion (XLIX)

Career NFL statistics
- Receptions: 2
- Receiving yards: 11
- Stats at Pro Football Reference

Jonathan Alexander Krause (born January 18, 1992) is an American former professional football wide receiver and coach who is the assistant wide receivers coach for the Miami Dolphins of the National Football League (NFL). He played college football for the Vanderbilt Commodores and attended South Gwinnett High School in Snellville, Georgia. He has played for the Cleveland Browns, New England Patriots, Philadelphia Eagles, Tampa Bay Buccaneers, and Tennessee Titans.

== College career ==
Part of Coach Bobby Johnson’s final recruiting class at Vanderbilt, Krause was a versatile offensive option for the Commodores. He finished his career with 98 receptions for 1,197 yards. He also scored two rushing touchdowns.

As a senior, Krause enjoyed a career year for the Commodores, bringing tremendous productivity to the receiving corps paced by fellow senior and All-SEC wide receiver Jordan Matthews. He started 11 of 13 games at wide receiver, setting new single-season career highs in virtually every statistical category, including 42 catches, 714 receiving yards and three TDs. Recorded two catches on the game winning drive against Tennessee in the regular season finale. Krause ranked seventh in the SEC with a 64.9-yard receiving average per game.

Serving as the team’s primary punt returner for most of his time in Nashville, Krause tallied a pair of return touchdowns in 2012 which included an 83 yard return at Wake Forest.

== Professional career ==
Pre-draft measurables
Height	Weight	Arm length	Hand span	Wingspan	40-yard dash	10-yard split	20-yard split	20-yard shuttle	Three-cone drill	Vertical jump	Broad jump	Bench press
5 ft 10 7/8 in (1.80 m)	187 lb (85 kg)	31 in (0.79 m)	9 in (0.23 m)	6 ft 6 3/8 in (1.99 m)	4.37 s	1.59 s	2.53 s	4.04 s	6.94 s	37.5 in (0.95 m)	10 ft 8 in (3.25 m)	13 reps
All values from Pro Day

=== Cleveland Browns ===
On May 12, 2014, the Cleveland Browns signed Krause to their practice squad. Krause was released from the Cleveland Browns' practice squad on August 25.

=== New England Patriots ===
On October 24, 2014, the New England Patriots signed Krause to their practice squad. Krause won Super Bowl XLIX with the Patriots after they defeated the defending champion Seattle Seahawks 28-24. Krause was released from the Patriots' practice squad on August 31, 2015.

=== Philadelphia Eagles ===
On September 22, 2015, the Philadelphia Eagles signed Krause to their practice squad. On November 24, the Eagles promoted Krause to their 53-man roster.

=== Tampa Bay Buccaneers ===
Krause subsequently signed with the Tampa Bay Buccaneers. On September 3, 2016, he was released by the Buccaneers as part of final roster cuts.

=== San Diego Chargers ===
On September 5, 2016, Krause was signed to the San Diego Chargers' practice squad. He was released by the Chargers on September 22.

=== Tampa Bay Buccaneers (second stint) ===
On September 28, 2016, Krause was signed to the Tampa Bay Buccaneers' practice squad. He was released by Tampa Bay on October 5.

=== Tennessee Titans ===
On November 1, 2016, Krause was signed to the Tennessee Titans' practice squad. He signed a reserve/future contract with the Titans on January 2, 2017. On September 2, Krause was waived by the Titans.
