= NBA Sixth Man of the Year =

National Basketball Association award

- Sport: Basketball
- League: National Basketball Association
- Awarded for: Best performing non-starting player in regular season of the National Basketball Association

History
- First award: 1982–83
- Most wins: Jamal Crawford; Lou Williams (tied, 3)
- Most recent: Keldon Johnson, San Antonio Spurs (2026)

The National Basketball Association's Sixth Man of the Year (colloquially known as the 6MOY) is an annual National Basketball Association (NBA) award given since the 1982–83 NBA season to the league's best performing player for his team coming off the bench as a substitute (or sixth man). A panel of sportswriters and broadcasters from throughout the United States and Canada votes on the recipient. Since the 2022–23 NBA season, winners receive the John Havlicek Trophy, named after the eight-time NBA champion.

Each judge casts a vote for first, second and third place selections. Each first-place vote is worth five points; each second-place vote is worth three points; and each third-place vote is worth one point. The player with the highest point total, regardless of the number of first-place votes, wins the award. To be eligible for the award, a player must come off the bench in more games than he starts. The 2008–09 winner, Jason Terry, averaged the most playing time of any sixth man in an award-winning season; he finished the year with an average of 33.7 minutes played per game with the Dallas Mavericks.

Bobby Jones was the inaugural winner of the award for the 1982–83 NBA season. The 2024–25 recipient was Payton Pritchard of the Boston Celtics. Jamal Crawford and Lou Williams are the only three-time winners of the award. Kevin McHale, Ricky Pierce and Detlef Schrempf won the award twice. McHale, Toni Kukoč, Bobby Jones, Bill Walton, and Manu Ginóbili are the only Hall of Famers who have won the award; Walton, along with James Harden, are the only award winners to have earned NBA MVP honors in their careers. Manu Ginóbili is the only award winner to be named to an All-NBA team in the same season. Mike Miller and Malcolm Brogdon are the only award winners to have also won NBA Rookie of the Year. John Starks, Darrell Armstrong, and Nazreon Hilton Reid are the only undrafted players to receive the award.

Manu Ginóbili, Detlef Schrempf, Leandro Barbosa, Toni Kukoč, and Ben Gordon are the only award winners not born in the United States. Gordon was the first player to win the award as a rookie. Of the five foreign-born winners, three were trained completely outside the U.S., namely Ginóbili, Barbosa and Kukoč. Schrempf played two years of high school basketball in Centralia, Washington before playing college basketball at Washington, and Gordon was raised in Mount Vernon, New York and went on to play in college at Connecticut.

== Winners ==
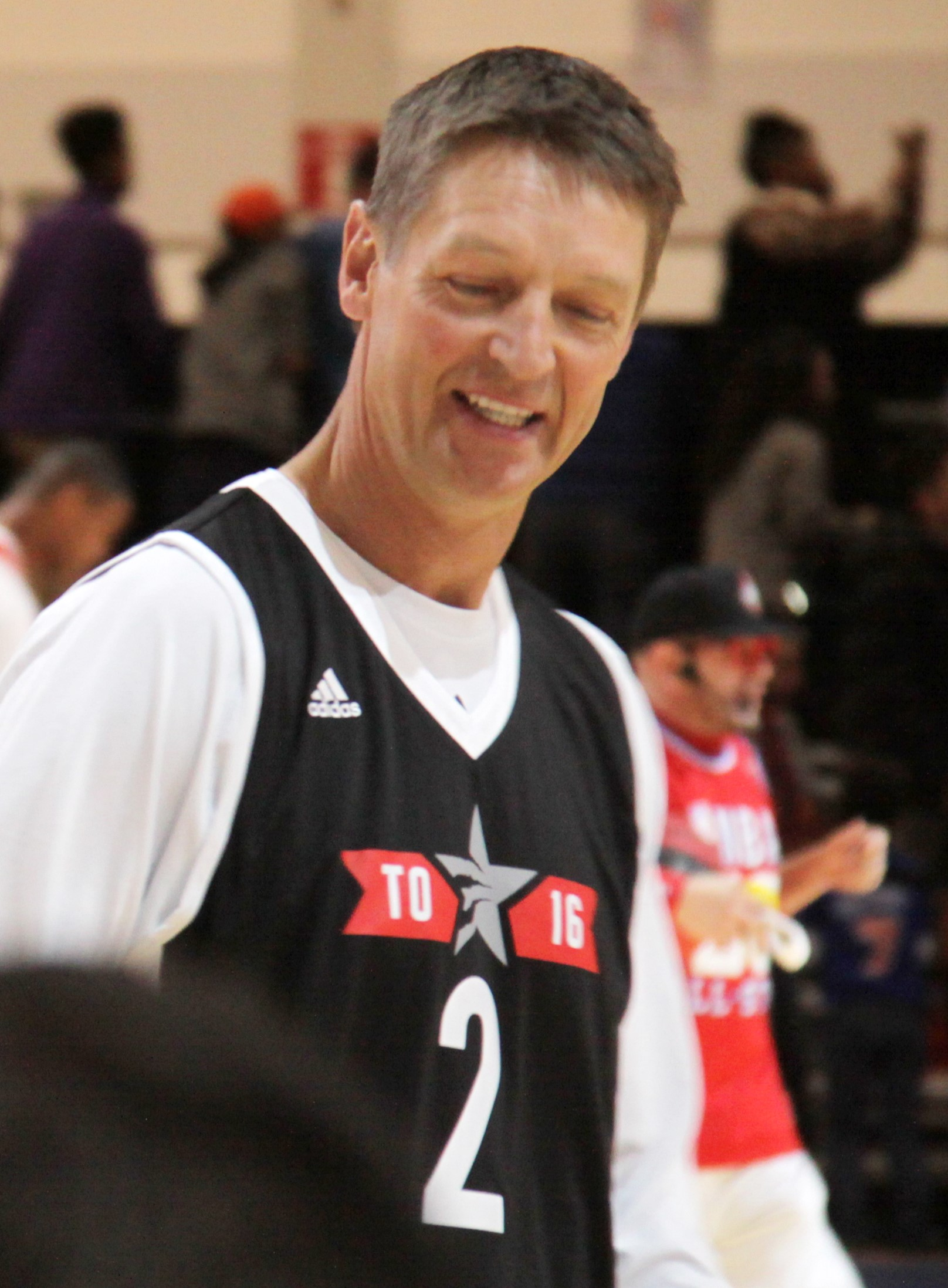
Detlef Schrempf was the first non-American to receive the award and won it twice.

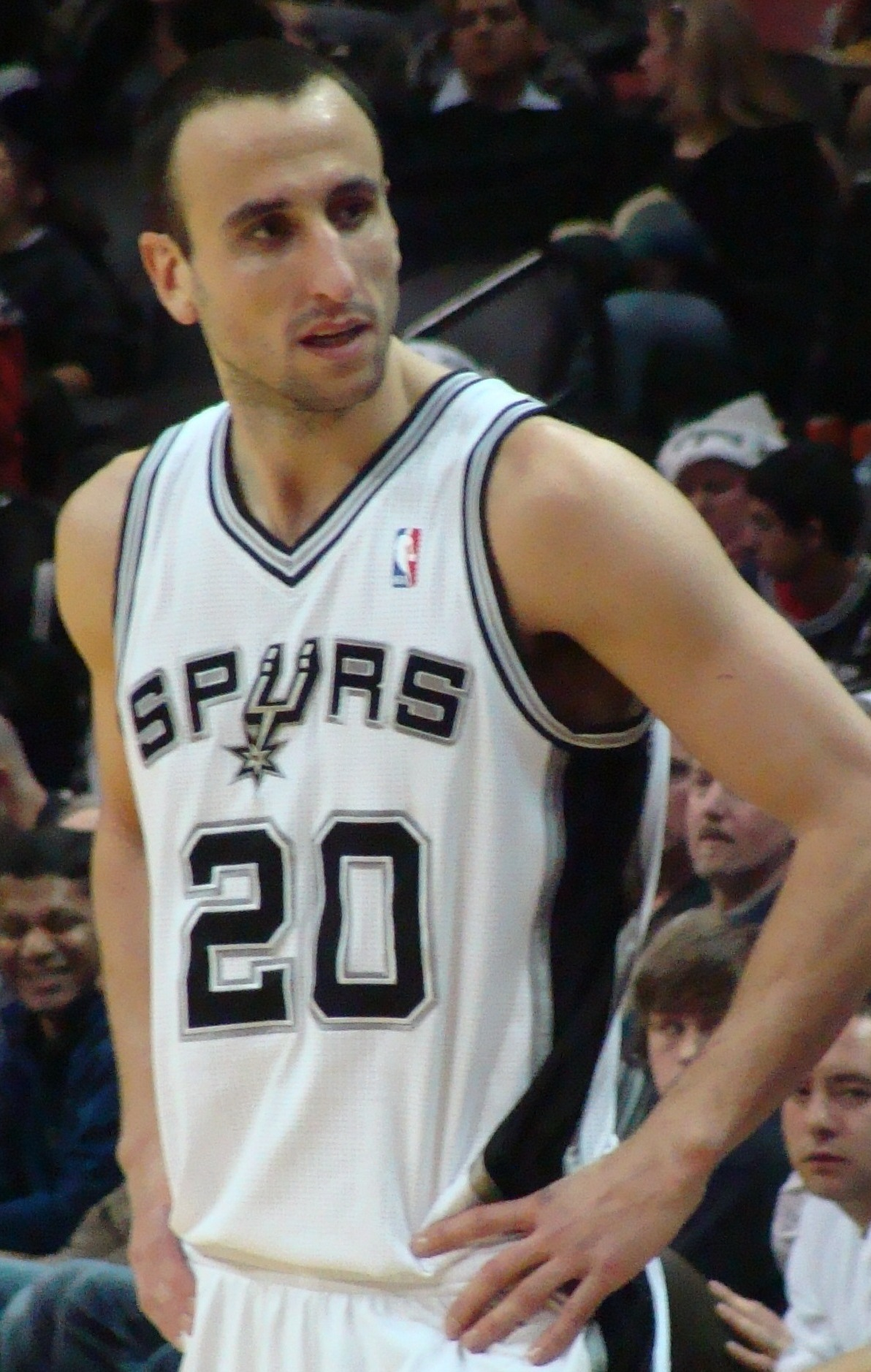
Manu Ginóbili won the award in the 2007–08 NBA season.

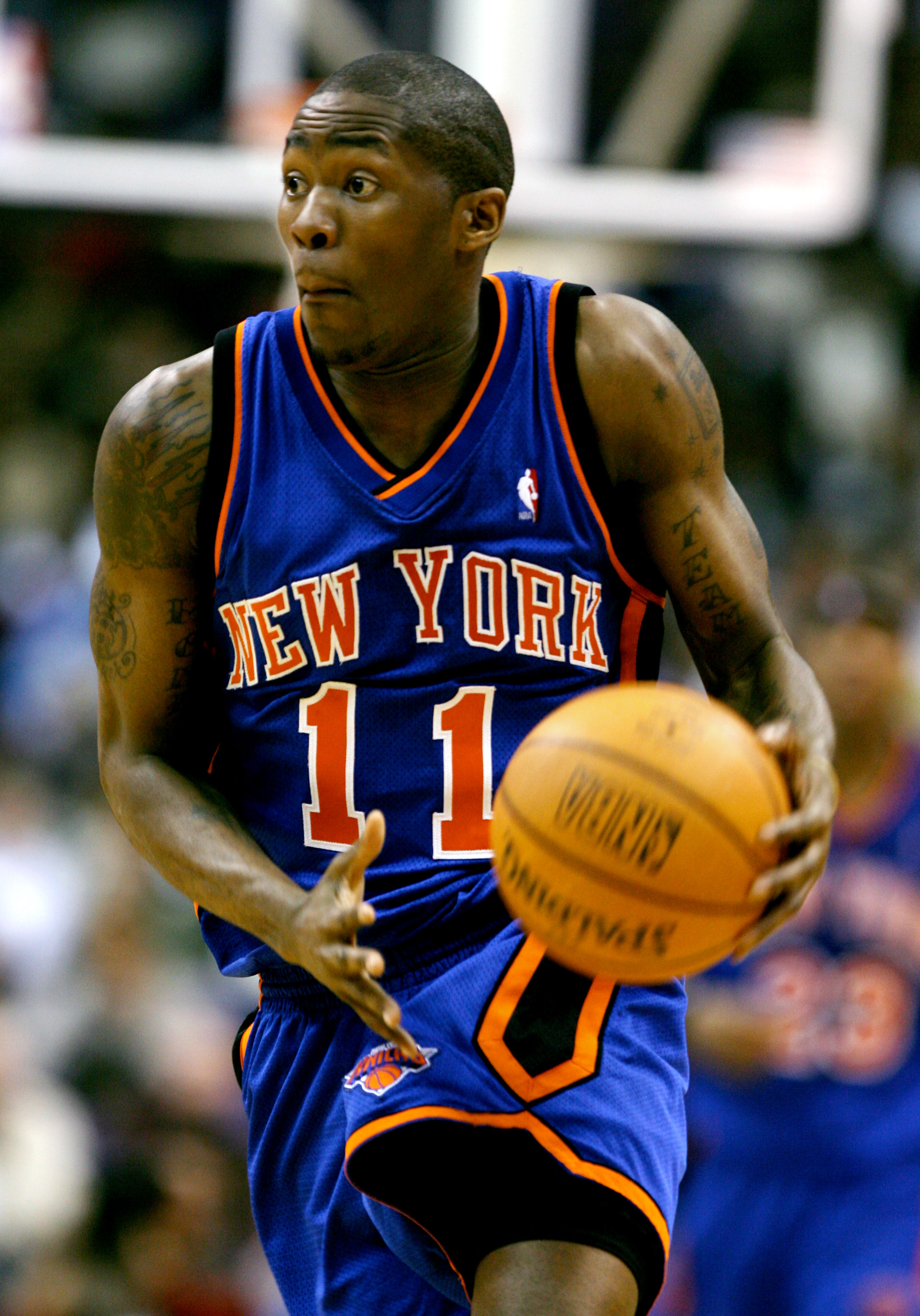
Jamal Crawford has won the award a record three times.

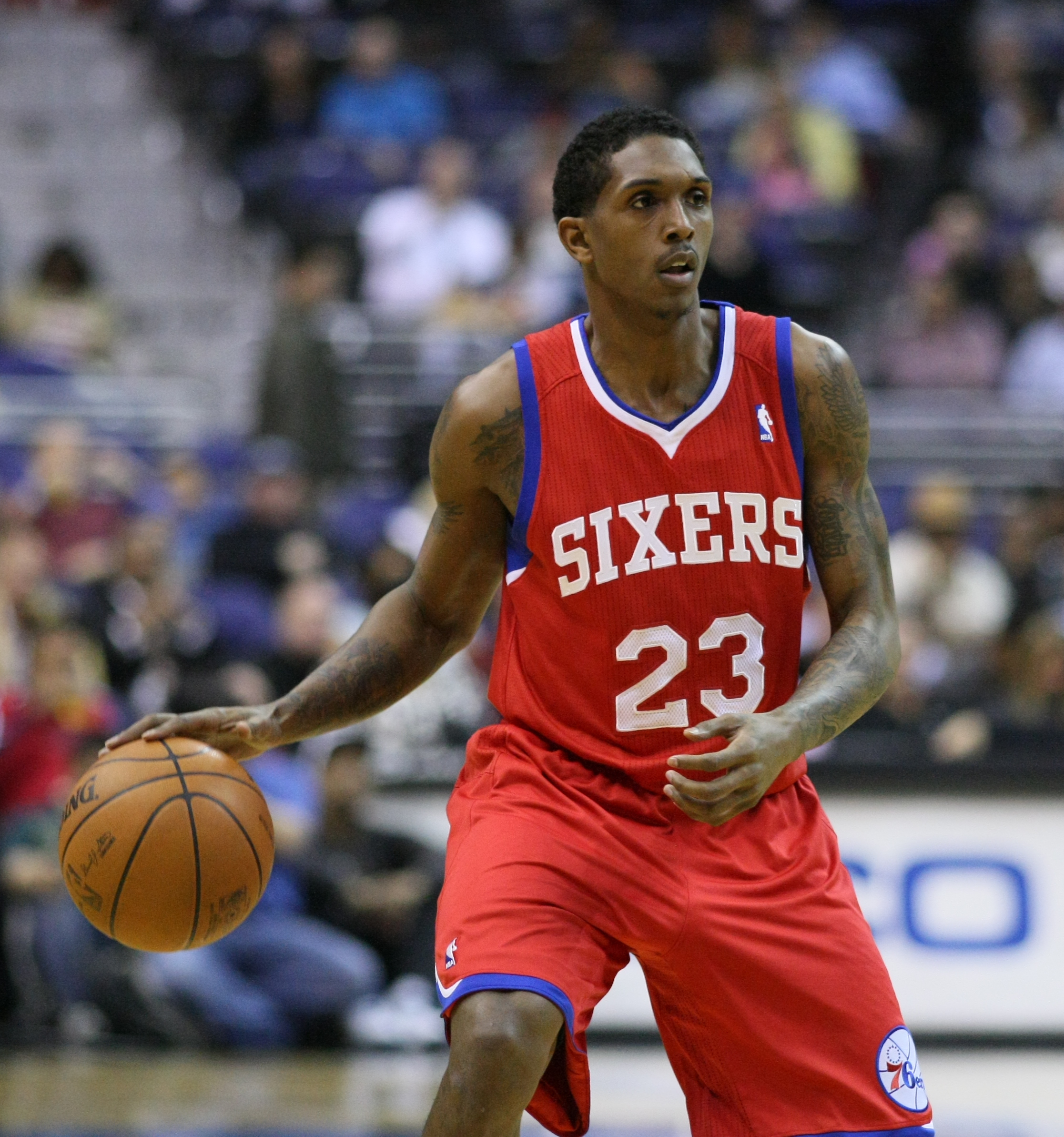
Lou Williams has won the award a record three times.

| ^ | Denotes player who is still active in the NBA |
| * | Elected to the Naismith Memorial Basketball Hall of Fame |
| † | Not yet eligible for Hall of Fame consideration (Note: A player is not eligible for induction into the Naismith Memorial Basketball Hall of Fame until he has been fully retired for two calendar years.) |
| Player (#) | Denotes the number of times the player has received the award |
| Team (#) | Denotes the number of times a player from this team has won |

| Season | Player | Position | Nationality | Team |
|---|---|---|---|---|
| 1982–83 | Bobby Jones* | Power forward | United States | Philadelphia 76ers |
| 1983–84 | Kevin McHale* | Power forward | United States | Boston Celtics |
| 1984–85 | Kevin McHale* (2) | Power forward | United States | Boston Celtics (2) |
| 1985–86 | Bill Walton* | Center | United States | Boston Celtics (3) |
| 1986–87 | Ricky Pierce | Shooting guard | United States | Milwaukee Bucks |
| 1987–88 | Roy Tarpley | Power forward | United States | Dallas Mavericks |
| 1988–89 | Eddie Johnson | Small forward | United States | Phoenix Suns |
| 1989–90 | Ricky Pierce (2) | Shooting guard | United States | Milwaukee Bucks (2) |
| 1990–91 | Detlef Schrempf | Power forward | Germany | Indiana Pacers |
| 1991–92 | Detlef Schrempf (2) | Power forward | Germany | Indiana Pacers (2) |
| 1992–93 | Clifford Robinson | Power forward | United States | Portland Trail Blazers |
| 1993–94 | Dell Curry | Shooting guard | United States | Charlotte Hornets |
| 1994–95 | Anthony Mason | Power forward | United States | New York Knicks |
| 1995–96 | Toni Kukoč* | Small forward | Croatia | Chicago Bulls |
| 1996–97 | John Starks | Shooting guard | United States | New York Knicks (2) |
| 1997–98 | Danny Manning | Power forward | United States | Phoenix Suns (2) |
| 1998–99 | Darrell Armstrong | Point guard | United States | Orlando Magic |
| 1999–00 | Rodney Rogers | Power forward | United States | Phoenix Suns (3) |
| 2000–01 | Aaron McKie | Shooting guard | United States | Philadelphia 76ers (2) |
| 2001–02 | Corliss Williamson | Small forward | United States | Detroit Pistons |
| 2002–03 | Bobby Jackson | Point guard | United States | Sacramento Kings |
| 2003–04 | Antawn Jamison | Small forward | United States | Dallas Mavericks (2) |
| 2004–05 | Ben Gordon | Shooting guard | United Kingdom (Note: Ben Gordon holds both American and British citizenship as he was born in England but was raised in the United States.) | Chicago Bulls (2) |
| 2005–06 | Mike Miller | Shooting guard | United States | Memphis Grizzlies |
| 2006–07 | Leandro Barbosa | Shooting guard | Brazil | Phoenix Suns (4) |
| 2007–08 | Manu Ginóbili* | Shooting guard | Argentina | San Antonio Spurs |
| 2008–09 | Jason Terry | Shooting guard | United States | Dallas Mavericks (3) |
| 2009–10 | Jamal Crawford | Shooting guard | United States | Atlanta Hawks |
| 2010–11 | Lamar Odom | Power forward | United States | Los Angeles Lakers |
| 2011–12 | James Harden^ | Shooting guard | United States | Oklahoma City Thunder |
| 2012–13 | J. R. Smith | Shooting guard | United States | New York Knicks (3) |
| 2013–14 | Jamal Crawford (2) | Shooting guard | United States | Los Angeles Clippers |
| 2014–15 | Lou Williams | Shooting guard | United States | Toronto Raptors |
| 2015–16 | Jamal Crawford (3) | Shooting guard | United States | Los Angeles Clippers (2) |
| 2016–17 | Eric Gordon^ | Shooting guard | United States | Houston Rockets |
| 2017–18 | Lou Williams (2) | Shooting guard | United States | Los Angeles Clippers (3) |
| 2018–19 | Lou Williams (3) | Shooting guard | United States | Los Angeles Clippers (4) |
| 2019–20 | Montrezl Harrell | Center | United States | Los Angeles Clippers (5) |
| 2020–21 | Jordan Clarkson^ | Shooting guard | United States (Note: Jordan Clarkson was born in the United States but naturalized Filipino. He represents the Philippines in international games.) | Utah Jazz |
| 2021–22 | Tyler Herro^ | Shooting guard | United States | Miami Heat |
| 2022–23 | Malcolm Brogdon^{†} | Shooting guard | United States | Boston Celtics (4) |
| 2023–24 | Naz Reid^ | Center | United States | Minnesota Timberwolves |
| 2024–25 | Payton Pritchard^ | Point guard | United States | Boston Celtics (5) |
| 2025–26 | Keldon Johnson^ | Small forward | United States | San Antonio Spurs (2) |

== Multi-time winners ==
| Awards | Player | Team(s) | Years |
|---|---|---|---|
| 3 | (United States) Lou Williams | Toronto Raptors | 2015 |
| 3 | (United States) Lou Williams | Los Angeles Clippers (2) | 2018, 2019 |
| 3 | (United States) Jamal Crawford | Atlanta Hawks | 2010 |
| 3 | (United States) Jamal Crawford | Los Angeles Clippers (2) | 2014, 2016 |
| 2 | (United States) Kevin McHale | Boston Celtics | 1984, 1985 |
| 2 | (United States) Ricky Pierce | Milwaukee Bucks | 1987, 1990 |
| 2 | (Germany) Detlef Schrempf | Indiana Pacers | 1991, 1992 |

== Teams ==
| Awards | Teams | Years |
|---|---|---|
| 5 | Boston Celtics | 1984, 1985, 1986, 2023, 2025 |
| 5 | Los Angeles Clippers | 2014, 2016, 2018, 2019, 2020 |
| 4 | Phoenix Suns | 1989, 1998, 2000, 2007 |
| 3 | Dallas Mavericks | 1988, 2004, 2009 |
| 3 | New York Knicks | 1995, 1997, 2013 |
| 2 | San Antonio Spurs | 2008, 2026 |
| 2 | Indiana Pacers | 1991,1992 |
| 2 | Philadelphia 76ers | 1983, 2001 |
| 2 | Milwaukee Bucks | 1987, 1990 |
| 2 | Chicago Bulls | 1996, 2005 |
| 1 | Portland Trail Blazers | 1993 |
| 1 | Charlotte Hornets | 1994 |
| 1 | Orlando Magic | 1999 |
| 1 | Detroit Pistons | 2002 |
| 1 | Sacramento Kings | 2003 |
| 1 | Memphis Grizzlies | 2006 |
| 1 | Atlanta Hawks | 2010 |
| 1 | Los Angeles Lakers | 2011 |
| 1 | Oklahoma City Thunder | 2012 |
| 1 | Toronto Raptors | 2015 |
| 1 | Houston Rockets | 2017 |
| 1 | Utah Jazz | 2021 |
| 1 | Miami Heat | 2022 |
| 1 | Minnesota Timberwolves | 2024 |
| None | Brooklyn Nets | |
| None | Denver Nuggets | |
| None | New Orleans Pelicans | |
| None | Washington Wizards | |
| None | Cleveland Cavaliers | |
| None | Golden State Warriors | |

== See also ==
- NBA records
