= Amanda Kyle Williams =

American novelist (1957–2018)

- Born: August 17, 1957; Norfolk, Virginia, U.S.
- Died: August 31, 2018 (aged 61); Decatur, Georgia, U.S.
- Occupation: Novelist
- Writing career
- Genre: Crime fiction
- Website: amandakylewilliams.com

Amanda Kyle Williams (August 17, 1957 – August 31, 2018) was an American crime writer best known for her Keye Street series of novels.

== Life ==
Williams was born in Norfolk, Virginia, and spent her childhood between Colorado and Georgia. She grew up with a learning disability and dropped out of South Gwinnett High School when she was 16 years old; she read her first book at the age of 23.

She began her writing career as a freelance writer for The Atlanta Journal-Constitution and also worked as a house painter, property manager, sales representative, commercial embroiderer, courier and dog walker. When she decided to experiment with writing crime fiction, she studied criminology to establish background knowledge, and worked with a private investigator firm in Atlanta on surveillance operations. She also worked as a process server to deliver subpoenas to people that the local sheriff's department couldn't locate.

Williams's Madison McGuire series of novels was published in the early 1990s; the lead character was modelled after Emma Peel in the television show The Avengers. The character of Keye Street, who appears in Williams's three novels published between 2011 and 2014, was inspired by Williams's Chinese niece, who, like Street, has white southern parents.

Williams was diagnosed with endometrial cancer in February 2014. She died on August 31, 2018, in Decatur, Georgia.

=== Recognition ===
Both The Stranger You Seek and The Stranger in the Room have appeared on annual best-of lists. Publishers Weekly called The Stranger You Seek "an explosive, unpredictable, and psychologically complex thriller that turns crime fiction clichés inside out." Her novels have been translated into nine languages.

In 1992 The Providence File was nominated for Best Mystery at the 4th Annual Lambda Literary Awards.

In 2012 The Stranger You Seek was shortlisted for the Townsend Prize for Fiction. The following year, the book was shortlisted for the Private Eye Writers of America's Shamus Award.

== Bibliography ==
=== Keye Street/Stranger series ===
- The Stranger You Seek (2011)
- Stranger in the Room (2012)
- Don't Talk to Strangers (2014)

=== Madison McGuire series ===
- Club Twelve (1990)
- The Providence File (1991)
- A Singular Spy (1992)
- The Spy in Question (1993)
