= Lou Williams =

American basketball player (born 1986)

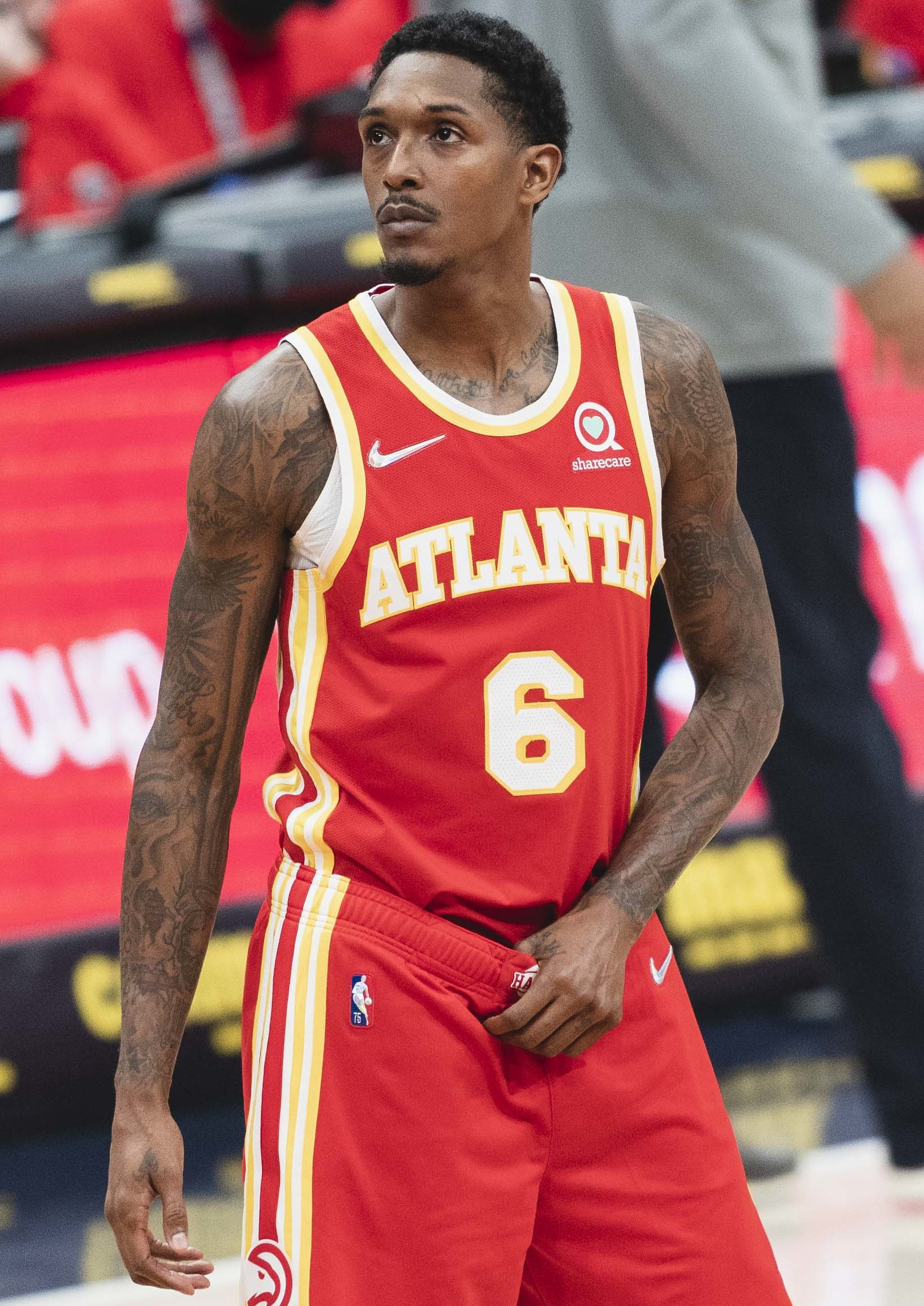
- Williams with the Atlanta Hawks in 2021

Personal information
- Born: October 27, 1986 (age 40) Memphis, Tennessee, U.S.
- Listed height: 6 ft 2 in (1.88 m)
- Listed weight: 175 lb (79 kg)

Career information
- High school: South Gwinnett (Snellville, Georgia)
- NBA draft: 2005: 2nd round, 45th overall pick
- Drafted by: Philadelphia 76ers
- Playing career: 2005–2022
- Position: Point guard / shooting guard
- Number: 23, 3, 12, 6

Career history
- 2005–2012: Philadelphia 76ers
- 2006: →Fort Worth Flyers
- 2012–2014: Atlanta Hawks
- 2014–2015: Toronto Raptors
- 2015–2017: Los Angeles Lakers
- 2017: Houston Rockets
- 2017–2021: Los Angeles Clippers
- 2021–2022: Atlanta Hawks

Career highlights
- 3× NBA Sixth Man of the Year (2015, 2018, 2019); Naismith Prep Player of the Year (2005); McDonald's All-American (2005); Mr. Georgia Basketball (2005); First-team Parade All-American (2005); Third-team Parade All-American (2004)

Career statistics
- Points: 15,593 (13.9 ppg)
- Rebounds: 2,484 (2.2 rpg)
- Assists: 3,789 (3.4 apg)
- Stats at NBA.com
- Stats at Basketball Reference

Louis Tyrone Williams (born October 27, 1986) is an American former professional basketball player. He was drafted directly out of high school by the Philadelphia 76ers with the 45th overall pick in the 2005 NBA draft. He is a 3-time NBA Sixth Man of the Year, a record he shares with Jamal Crawford. As of March 2019, he is the NBA's career leader in points off the bench, and has played the most career games off the bench, surpassing Dell Curry's record in February 2022.

Williams spent seven seasons with Philadelphia before signing with the Atlanta Hawks in 2012, playing two seasons there before being traded to the Toronto Raptors in the 2014 offseason. He spent a season with the Raptors and then signed with the Los Angeles Lakers from 2015 until the middle of the 2016–17 NBA season, when he was traded to the Houston Rockets. After finishing the season with the Rockets, he was then traded in the 2017 offseason to the Los Angeles Clippers. Williams was dealt back to the Hawks in 2021.

== High school career ==
Williams was born in Memphis, Tennessee and moved to Atlanta in his teens. Williams played at Snellville's South Gwinnett High School under Roger Fleetwood, where he was a four-time All-State selection and was named Georgia's "Mr. Basketball" as a senior. As a junior, Williams led South Gwinnett to the 5A Georgia State Championship. At the end of his senior year, Williams was named the Naismith Prep Player of the Year and a McDonald's All-American as well as a first-team Parade All-American. Lou Williams also participated in the Nike Hoop Summit and Jordan Brand Classic.

Considered a five-star recruit by Rivals.com, Williams was listed as the No. 1 shooting guard and the No. 3 player in the nation overall in 2005.

Williams, and high school teammate Mike Mercer, committed to play at the University of Georgia, for then-coach Dennis Felton, but Williams ended up declaring for the 2005 NBA draft instead. Williams finished his career as the all-time leading scorer in Georgia high school basketball history.

== Professional career ==
=== Philadelphia 76ers (2005–2012) ===
Williams was picked in the 2nd round of the draft and 45th overall by the Philadelphia 76ers. He played over thirty games in his rookie season, averaging 1.9 points and 0.3 assists.

The next season, Williams was sent to play for the Fort Worth Flyers of the NBA Development League on November 28, 2006. After a good showing in the D-League, and trade rumors surrounding 76ers' starting point guard Allen Iverson, Williams was recalled to the 76ers' roster on December 8, 2006.

During the 2007–08 season, Williams averaged 11.3 ppg, 3.2 apg and 2.0 rpg. At the end of that season, Williams became a restricted free agent and signed a five-year deal worth $25 million to remain with Philadelphia.

In game 4 of the first round of the 2011 Eastern Conference Playoffs, Williams hit a go-ahead three-pointer to give the 76ers a win against the Miami Heat, 86–82. However, the Sixers ended up losing the series in five games.

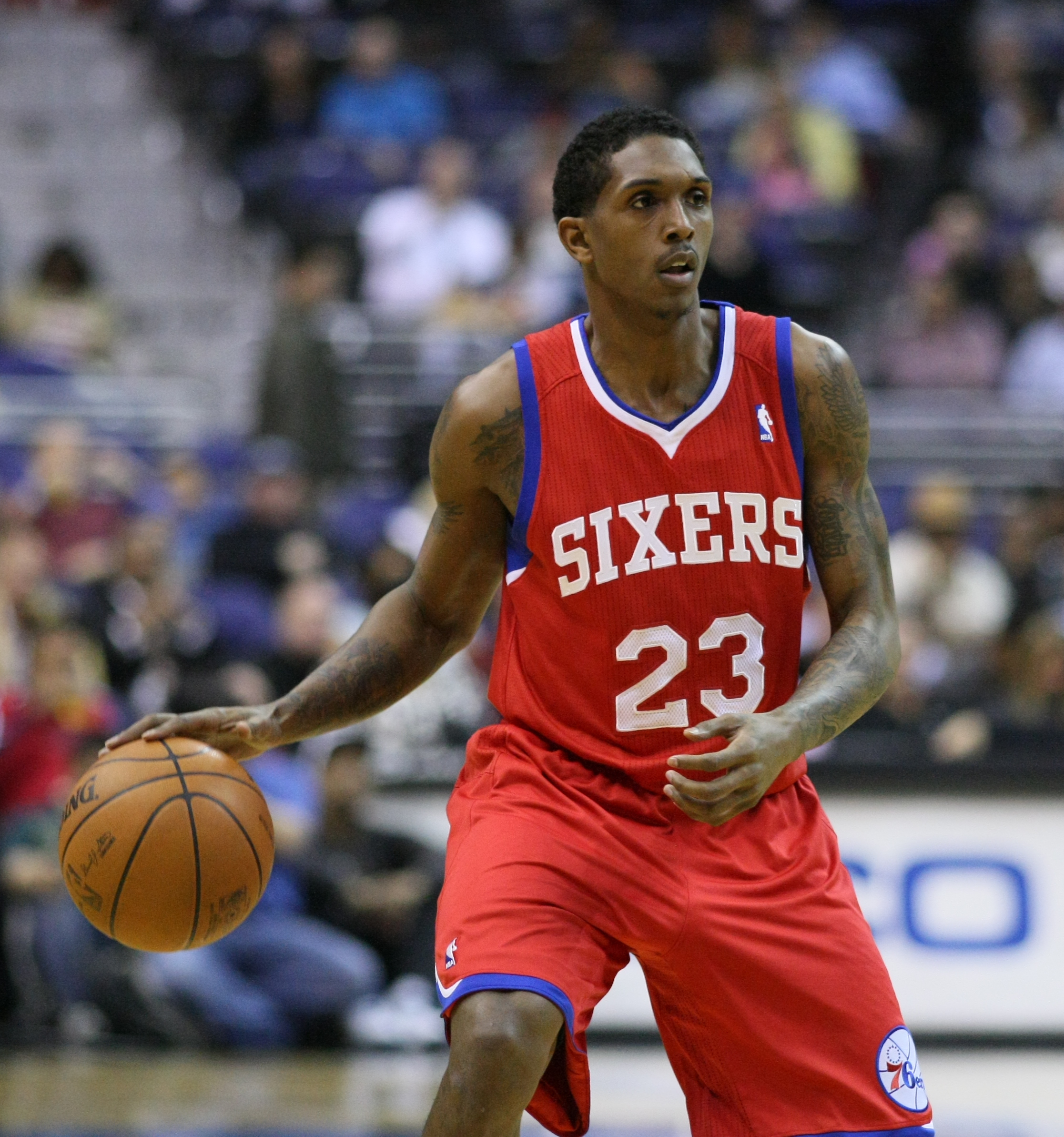
Williams with the 76ers in 2010

For the 2011–12 season, Williams led the 76ers in scoring with 14.9 points per game, despite not starting a single game. He was the runner-up finisher for the NBA Sixth Man of the Year Award.

=== Atlanta Hawks (2012–2014) ===
On July 12, 2012, Williams signed with the Atlanta Hawks. On January 18, 2013, against the Brooklyn Nets, Williams landed awkwardly on his right knee and had to leave the game on a wheelchair. It was later revealed that he tore his ACL and would miss the rest of the season.

Williams missed the first few games of the 2013–14 season while recovering from his knee injury. He made his debut on November 20, 2013, scoring 6 points off the bench. On December 14, 2013, Williams scored a season high of 27 points. He finished the season with averages of 10.4 points, 3.5 assists, and 2.1 rebounds.

=== Toronto Raptors (2014–2015) ===
On June 30, 2014, Williams was traded, along with the draft rights to Lucas Nogueira, to the Toronto Raptors in exchange for John Salmons and a 2015 second-round pick. On November 22, 2014, he scored a then career-high 36 points in the Raptors' 110–93 win over the Cleveland Cavaliers. On April 20, 2015, Williams was named the 2015 NBA Sixth Man of the Year, becoming the first member of the Toronto Raptors to ever win the award.

=== Los Angeles Lakers (2015–2017) ===
On July 9, 2015, Williams signed a three-year, $21 million contract with the Los Angeles Lakers. He made his debut for the Lakers in the season opener against the Minnesota Timberwolves on October 28, 2015, scoring 21 points off the bench in a 112–111 loss. On January 3, 2016, he scored a then season-high 30 points in a 97–77 win over the Phoenix Suns. Five days later, he scored 23 of his then career-high 44 points in the fourth quarter of the Lakers' 117–113 loss to the Oklahoma City Thunder.

On December 3, 2016, Williams scored a season-high 40 points off the bench in a 103–100 loss to the Memphis Grizzlies. Williams's 40 points were the most ever scored by an opponent's reserve against Memphis, and he became the first player to score 40 off the bench since Jordan Crawford in April 2014. Two days later, he had 38 points, six rebounds and seven assists in a 107–101 loss to the Utah Jazz, putting together the first back-to-back 30-point games of his 12-year NBA career. He also became the first Lakers player to score at least 38 points in successive games since Kobe Bryant in March 2013. Over four games between December 3 and 9, Williams scored 137 points—the biggest four-game scoring performance by a reserve since the NBA began keeping track of starts in 1970.

=== Houston Rockets (2017) ===
On February 23, 2017, Williams was traded to the Houston Rockets in exchange for Corey Brewer and a 2017 first-round draft pick. He made his debut for the Rockets that night, scoring 27 points with seven three-pointers off the bench in a 129–99 win over the New Orleans Pelicans. On March 15, 2017, he scored 30 points in a 139–100 win over the Lakers.

=== Los Angeles Clippers (2017–2021) ===
==== 2017–18 season ====
On June 28, 2017, the Los Angeles Clippers acquired Williams, Patrick Beverley, Sam Dekker, Montrezl Harrell, Darrun Hilliard, DeAndre Liggins, Kyle Wiltjer, and a 2018 first-round pick from the Houston Rockets in exchange for Chris Paul. On November 27, 2017, Williams scored a season-high 42 points in a 120–115 win over the Los Angeles Lakers. On December 9, 2017, he hit a go-ahead pull-up 3-pointer with 1.2 seconds remaining, lifting the Clippers to a 113–112 victory over the Washington Wizards. He finished with 35 points to lead a dominant bench effort for the Clippers. On December 31, 2017, he scored 40 points off the bench in a 106–98 win over the Charlotte Hornets. Williams was subsequently named Western Conference Player of the Week for games played Monday, December 25 through Sunday, December 31. On January 10, 2018, he scored 27 of his career-high 50 points in the third quarter of the Clippers' 125–106 win over the Golden State Warriors. He shot 16 for 27 with a career-best eight 3-pointers and made all 10 of his free throws. It was the highest scoring effort by any Clipper in a single game since Charles Smith tied a franchise record with 52 points in December 1990. Williams was subsequently named Western Conference Player of the Week for games played Monday, January 8 through Sunday, January 14. On January 20, 2018, he recorded 31 points, a franchise-record 10 steals, and seven assists in a 125–113 loss to the Utah Jazz. He became the first player in league history to reach 30 points, 10 steals, and seven assists in a game since steals became a recorded stat. On January 26, 2018, he had 40 points and matched his season high with 10 assists in the Clippers' 109–100 victory over the Memphis Grizzlies. On February 7, 2018, he signed a multi-year contract extension with the Clippers. On February 23, 2018, he had 35 points in 33 minutes, including a 23-point second quarter, in a 128–117 win over the Phoenix Suns. Williams averaged career highs in points (22.6), assists (5.3), and minutes (32.8) during the 2017–18 season. His bench scoring led the NBA in his 13th season. He was subsequently named NBA Sixth Man of the Year for the second time in his career.

==== 2018–19 season ====
On November 2, 2018, Williams scored 23 of his game-high 28 points in the second half of the Clippers' 120–95 win over the Orlando Magic. The Clippers started the season with a 17–9 record before Williams suffered a right hamstring injury. In the four games he missed, the Clippers endured a four-game losing streak. In his return to action on December 20, Williams scored 13 of his 26 points in the fourth quarter of the Clippers' 125–121 win over the Dallas Mavericks. On December 28, he had a season-high 36 points in a 118–107 win over the Lakers. On January 25, 2019, he recorded his first career triple-double with 31 points, 10 assists and 10 rebounds in a 106–101 win over the Chicago Bulls, joining Detlef Schrempf (in 1993) as the only other player in NBA history with a 30-point triple double off the bench. Williams' first triple-double occurred in his 904th career game—only Zach Randolph at 974 games logged his first later in his career. On February 2, he scored 39 points and helped the Clippers rally from a 25-point deficit to beat the Detroit Pistons 111–101. On February 11, he scored a season-high 45 points off the bench in a 130–120 loss to the Minnesota Timberwolves. On February 13, he recorded 30 points and 10 assists in 22 minutes in a 134–107 win over the Suns, becoming the first player in NBA history with at least 30 points and 10 assists in fewer than 23 minutes. On March 8, he scored 40 points in a 118–110 win over the Oklahoma City Thunder, thus passing Jamal Crawford for second in NBA career points off the bench. It was also the 28th game of his career with 30 or more off the bench, breaking Ricky Pierce's record of 27. On March 11, he became the NBA's career leader in points off the bench with 34 points in a 140–115 win over the Boston Celtics, thus surpassing Dell Curry (11,147). On March 17, he scored 25 points and hit a 28-foot 3-pointer from the top of the key at the buzzer to give the Clippers a 119–116 victory over the Brooklyn Nets.

On April 15, 2019, Williams had 36 points and 11 assists to help the Clippers overcome a 31-point deficit—the biggest comeback in NBA playoff history—and tie the first-round series at 1–1 against the Warriors with a 135–131 win. He became only the second bench player in NBA history with a 30-point, 10-assist performance in the playoffs. In Game 5 of the series, he had 33 points and 10 assists in a 129–121 win. The Clippers went on to lose Game 6 to bow out of the playoffs. At the NBA's end-of-season awards night, Williams was named the NBA's Sixth Man of the Year, joining Jamal Crawford as the only three-time winners of the award.

==== 2019–20 season ====
After violating the rules of the NBA Bubble, Williams was required to sit out the first two seeding games of the 2019–20 season to fulfill his quarantine requirements. In the 2020 NBA playoffs, he struggled throughout the postseason, having averages of 12.8 points and 4.2 assists as the Clippers fell in seven games against the Denver Nuggets while surrendering a 3–1 lead in the Western Conference semi-finals.

==== 2020–21 season ====
On February 14, 2021, Williams logged 30 points and 10 assists, both season-highs, in a 128–111 win over the Cleveland Cavaliers.

=== Return to Atlanta (2021–2022) ===
On March 25, 2021, Williams, two second-round draft picks, and cash considerations were traded to the Atlanta Hawks in exchange for Rajon Rondo. With his hometown team, Williams reached the Conference Finals for the first time in his career and played a career high 18 playoff games with his Atlanta Hawks. On August 6, 2021, he re-signed with the Hawks.

=== Retirement ===
On June 18, 2023, Williams announced his retirement after a 17-year career at the age of 36. By the time his career was over, Williams had scored 13,396 points off the bench, which stands as an NBA record.

== Personal life ==
Williams is the son of Willie Louis Williams and Janice Faulkner. He has two brothers, Taurus Stinnett and Willie Louis Williams II, and one sister, Shaun Haynes. Williams has three children. He is a close friend of Bow Wow and was seen socializing with him at his house on an episode of MTV Cribs.

Williams has recorded several rap tracks and was featured on Meek Mill's single "I Want It All".

He runs an annual summer camp at South Gwinnett High School, his alma mater, for children ages 10–16. "This camp means a lot to me because I can give back to a community that has done so much for me", Williams said.

In December 2011, Williams claimed his NBA recognition saved him from an armed robbery attempt in the Philadelphia neighborhood of Manayunk. A gunman allegedly tried to rob Williams but stopped and said he was a fan of the player. After Williams and the gunman reached an understanding, Williams bought him food from McDonald's.

In 2014, it was revealed that Williams was dating both Ashley Henderson and Rece Mitchell at the same time. As of 2018, his relationship with Henderson had ended.

He is the subject of a song by Canadian rapper Drake called "6 Man" on Drake's mixtape If You're Reading This It's Too Late. Drake referenced Williams' role as a sixth man for the Raptors, as well as his alleged two girlfriends. The song was released on February 12, 2015, the same season Williams won the Sixth Man of the Year Award. The song was played during Williams' trophy presentation during the Raptors playoff game against the Washington Wizards, and he is featured in the song's music video: a promotion for OVO's Raptors themed Spring 2015 Apparel.

In July 2020, while on an excused absence from the Orlando NBA quarantine bubble, Williams attended a funeral viewing for Paul G. Williams, the father of a family friend. After the viewing, Williams went to the Magic City gentlemen's club for dinner. The controversy caused NBA investigators to question Williams and assess the length of his re-quarantining process. It also led to him receiving the nickname Lemon Pepper Lou.

After an interview on a podcast, Lou Williams gained the nickname "Lemon Pepper Lou" which originates from the type of seasonings preferred on chicken wings while visiting the aforementioned gentlemen's club.

== NBA career statistics ==
Legend
GP	Games played	GS	Games started	MPG	Minutes per game
FG%	Field goal percentage	3P%	3-point field goal percentage	FT%	Free throw percentage
RPG	Rebounds per game	APG	Assists per game	SPG	Steals per game
BPG	Blocks per game	PPG	Points per game	**Bold**	Career high

=== Regular season ===
Year	Team	GP	GS	MPG	FG%	3P%	FT%	RPG	APG	SPG	BPG	PPG
2005–06	Philadelphia	30	0	4.8	.442	.222	.615	.6	.3	.2	.0	1.9
2006–07	Philadelphia	61	0	11.3	.441	.324	.696	1.1	1.8	.4	.0	4.3
2007–08	Philadelphia	80	0	23.3	.424	.359	.783	2.1	3.2	1.0	.2	11.5
2008–09	Philadelphia	**81**	0	23.7	.398	.286	.790	2.0	3.0	1.0	.2	12.8
2009–10	Philadelphia	64	**38**	29.9	**.470**	.340	.824	2.9	4.2	**1.3**	.2	14.0
2010–11	Philadelphia	75	0	23.3	.406	.348	.823	2.0	3.4	.6	.2	13.7
2011–12	Philadelphia	64	0	26.3	.407	.362	.812	2.4	3.5	.8	.3	14.9
2012–13	Atlanta	39	9	28.7	.422	.367	.868	2.1	3.6	1.1	.3	14.1
2013–14	Atlanta	60	7	24.1	.400	.342	.849	2.1	3.5	.8	.1	10.4
2014–15	Toronto	80	0	25.2	.404	.340	.861	1.9	2.1	1.1	.1	15.5
2015–16	L.A. Lakers	67	35	28.5	.408	.344	.830	2.5	2.5	.9	.3	15.3
2016–17	L.A. Lakers	58	1	24.2	.444	.385	**.884**	2.3	3.2	1.1	.2	18.6
2016–17	Houston	23	0	25.7	.385	.315	.867	3.0	2.4	.7	**.4**	14.9
2017–18	L.A. Clippers	79	19	**32.8**	.435	.359	.880	2.5	5.3	1.1	.2	**22.6**
2018–19	L.A. Clippers	75	1	26.6	.425	.361	.876	3.0	5.4	.8	.1	20.0
2019–20	L.A. Clippers	65	8	28.7	.418	.352	.861	**3.1**	**5.6**	.7	.2	18.2
2020–21	L.A. Clippers	42	3	21.9	.421	.378	.866	2.1	3.4	.9	.1	12.1
2020–21	Atlanta	24	1	21.0	.389	**.444**	.870	2.1	3.4	.3	.1	10.0
2021–22	Atlanta	56	0	14.3	.391	.363	.859	1.6	1.9	.5	.1	6.3
Career		1,123	122	24.1	.419	.351	.842	2.2	3.4	.8	.2	13.9

=== Playoffs ===
Year	Team	GP	GS	MPG	FG%	3P%	FT%	RPG	APG	SPG	BPG	PPG
2008	Philadelphia	6	0	22.5	.400	.222	.733	2.0	2.0	1.0	.0	12.0
2009	Philadelphia	6	0	24.8	.412	.375	.667	2.5	2.8	.5	**.2**	9.7
2011	Philadelphia	5	0	26.0	.327	.300	.737	1.6	3.0	1.0	.0	10.8
2012	Philadelphia	13	0	27.5	.352	.167	.788	2.1	3.0	1.0	.0	11.5
2014	Atlanta	7	0	19.0	.380	.313	.938	2.3	1.1	1.0	.1	8.3
2015	Toronto	4	0	25.5	.314	.190	.833	1.8	1.3	**1.5**	.0	12.8
2017	Houston	11	0	24.7	.424	.308	.897	2.7	1.3	.6	.1	12.5
2019	L.A. Clippers	6	0	**29.3**	.433	.333	.829	2.8	**7.7**	.8	**.2**	**21.7**
2020	L.A. Clippers	13	0	26.2	.425	.235	.811	**3.2**	4.2	.8	**.2**	12.8
2021	Atlanta	**18**	**2**	15.4	**.455**	**.433**	**.963**	1.4	2.2	.7	.1	7.7
Career		89	2	23.3	.400	.276	.820	2.2	2.8	.8	.1	11.4
