= South Gwinnett High School =

Public high school in Snellville, Georgia, United States

Location
- 2288 East Main Street; Snellville, Georgia 30078
- Coordinates: 33°51′14″N 84°00′27″W

Information
- Type: Public
- Established: 1957
- School district: Gwinnett County Public Schools
- Principal: Rodney D. Jordan
- Staff: 158.40 (FTE)
- Grades: 9–12
- Enrollment: 2,588 (2023–2024)
- Student to teacher ratio: 16.34
- Campus: Suburban
- Colors: Navy and gray
- Mascot: Comet
- Accreditation: SACS
- Information: 770-972-4840
- Region: 4 in Class AAAAAAA (GHSA)
- Website: South Gwinnett High School

South Gwinnett High School (SGHS) is a public high school for students in grades 9–12. The school is located in Snellville, Georgia, United States. It is part of the Gwinnett County Public Schools system, one of the 15 largest public school systems in the country. South Gwinnett is home to about 2,800 students. The school pulls from much of Southeastern Gwinnett county, including areas of Snellville and rural residential areas of Loganville.

The oldest of the four high schools in southeastern Gwinnett County, Snellville Consolidated High School was formed by the 1957 merger of Snellville High School (founded in 1923) and Grayson High School. As Gwinnett County saw extremely rapid population growth in the 1980s, Shiloh High School and Brookwood High School were opened to accommodate the rapid growth in South Gwinnett's school district. As Gwinnett County continued to see more students enter its system, South Gwinnett's district was split in half in 2000, when Grayson High School was "re-opened" at a new facility in Loganville.

== Awards and recognition ==
South Gwinnett was ranked as the 711th best high school in the State of Georgia in 2002 by the Georgia Public Policy Foundation. The school was ranked 159th in the state and 12th (of 16) in Gwinnett County in the 2010 GPPF Report Card.

The school's mock trial team won the National High School Mock Trial Championship in 1995, held in Denver, Colorado.

South Gwinnett High School made Adequate Yearly Progress (AYP) in 2009. Under the No Child Left Behind Act, a school makes AYP if it achieves the minimum levels of improvement determined by the state of Georgia in terms of student performance and other accountability measures.

== Notable alumni ==
- 21 Savage, rapper
- Stephen Adegoke, safeties coach for the Houston Texans
- Clay Cook, singer-songwriter and Zac Brown Band guitarist
- David Greene, former NFL football player
- Drew "Druski" Desbordes, comedian
- Jonathan Krause, NFL football player
- Mike Mercer, former college basketball player
- Nakia Sanford, former WNBA basketball player
- Rodgeriqus Smith, CFL football player
- Amanda Kyle Williams, crime writer
- Lou Williams, former NBA basketball player

=== Notable faculty ===
- Larry Highbaugh, CFL football player
