= Snellville, Georgia =

City in Georgia, United States

- City
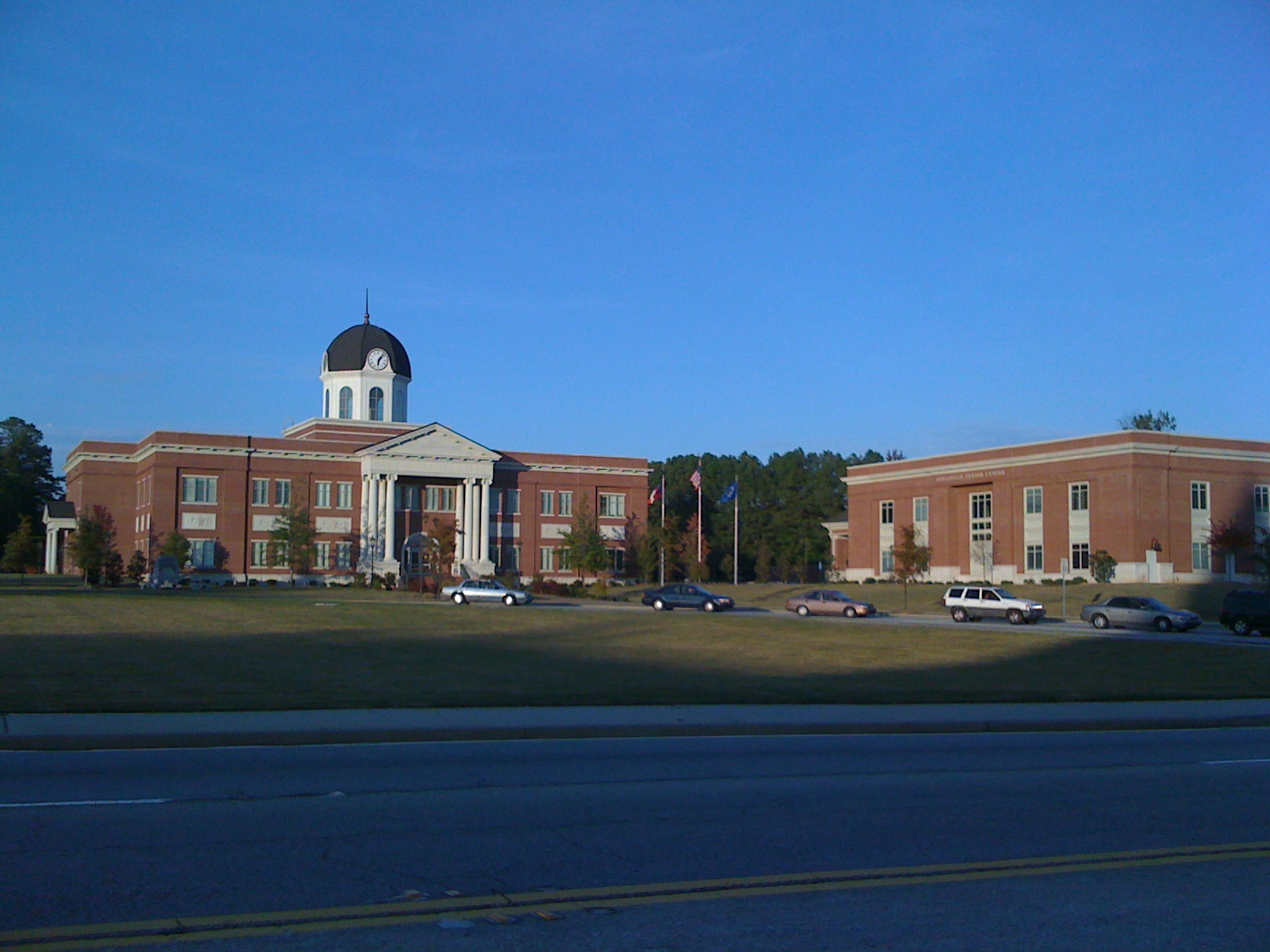
- City Hall

- Flag Seal Town Center Logo
- Motto: "Snellville, Where Everybody's Proud to be Somebody"
- Coordinates: 33°51′22″N 84°00′14″W
- Country: United States
- State: Georgia
- County: Gwinnett
- Settled: 1874
- Incorporated: 1923

Government
  - Type: Council-Manager
  - Mayor: Barbara Bender
  - City Manager: Matthew Pepper
  - Police Chief: Greg Perry

Area
  - Total: 10.60 sq mi (27.46 km^{2})
  - Land: 10.47 sq mi (27.12 km^{2})
  - Water: 0.13 sq mi (0.34 km^{2})
- Elevation: 1,037 ft (316 m)

Population (2020)
  - Total: 20,573
  - Density: 1,964.8/sq mi (758.61/km^{2})
- Time zone: UTC-5 (EST)
  - Summer (DST): UTC-4 (EDT)
- ZIP Code(s): 30078–30039
- Area code: 770
- Cell Phone Area Code(s): 770, 678, 404
- GNIS feature ID: 2405480
- Website: snellville.org

Snellville is a city in Gwinnett County, Georgia, United States, east of Atlanta. Its population was 20,573 at the 2020 census. It is a developed suburb of Atlanta and a part of the Atlanta metropolitan area, and is located roughly 33 miles east of downtown Atlanta via US 78 and Interstate 285.

== History ==
Before the arrival of European settlers, Creek Indians inhabited the area.

=== English settlers ===
In 1884, Thomas Snell and James Sawyer, 17-year-old friends from London, secretly planned a voyage to the United States. On March 18, James Sawyer and his brother, Charles, left England. However, Snell's parents, having learned of the plan, would not allow him to leave, thus delaying his departure. The Sawyer brothers arrived in New York City on April 1, and after a few weeks, headed toward Athens, Georgia, and then to Madison County, where they stayed and worked on a farm for $10 a month. Snell did eventually follow his friends to New York and made his way south to meet them. The three then made their way through Jefferson and Lawrenceville. Shortly after Snell's arrival, Charles left for Pennsylvania, later returning to the South and settling in Alabama, where he went into the turpentine business. James had gone also, in search of his brother, leaving Snell to work on the farm of A. A.

Unable to find his brother, James Sawyer returned to New York and began work on a farm near the Hudson River area until his 21st birthday in 1878, when he returned to England to claim his inheritance. Shortly following, in August 1879, he returned to Americus, Georgia, and then Gwinnett County. Once in Gwinnett County, Sawyer found Snell in the small settlement then known as New London, near Stone Mountain. In the homestead that Snell now referred to as Snellville, the two built a small wood-frame building and started a business together, Snell and Sawyer's Store, similar to the one in which they were employed in London. As was common in small mill towns of the time, they printed store money with the trade value and Snell's likeness on the front that regular customers could use to purchase goods. By the end of 1879, the business was prospering and catering to customers from the neighboring towns of Lawrenceville and Loganville. Travelers bought supplies at "Snell and Sawyer's" and often spent the night in the nearby oak groves, as the trip was too great for one day's travel. When New London officially became Snellville is unknown, but the location of the partners' store was referred to as Snellville in their advertising, and the young town began to show a promising future.

The partnership later dissolved, and Sawyer kept the old store, building granite stone above and around the old frame and then disassembling the wood frame from within. Snell built a new store of granite. In 1883, Sawyer built a home and married Emma Webb, of the historic Snellville Webb family, on November 15. Sawyer opened Snellville's first post office in 1885 and served as postmaster from the back of his store.

Snell died at age 39 in 1896 due to complications following an appendicitis operation. He was buried in Brownlee Mountain, presently known as Nob Hill, and was later reburied in nearby Lithonia.

Initially forced into partial retirement due to failing eyesight, Sawyer later lost his sight completely. After that time, the store was owned and operated by various merchants. It was eventually destroyed in 1960 and replaced by a service station. James Sawyer died in 1948 at age 91 and is buried in the Baptist Cemetery (now Snellville Historical Cemetery).

=== City beginnings ===
The city of Snellville received its charter from the General Assembly of the State of Georgia in 1923.

=== Recent times ===
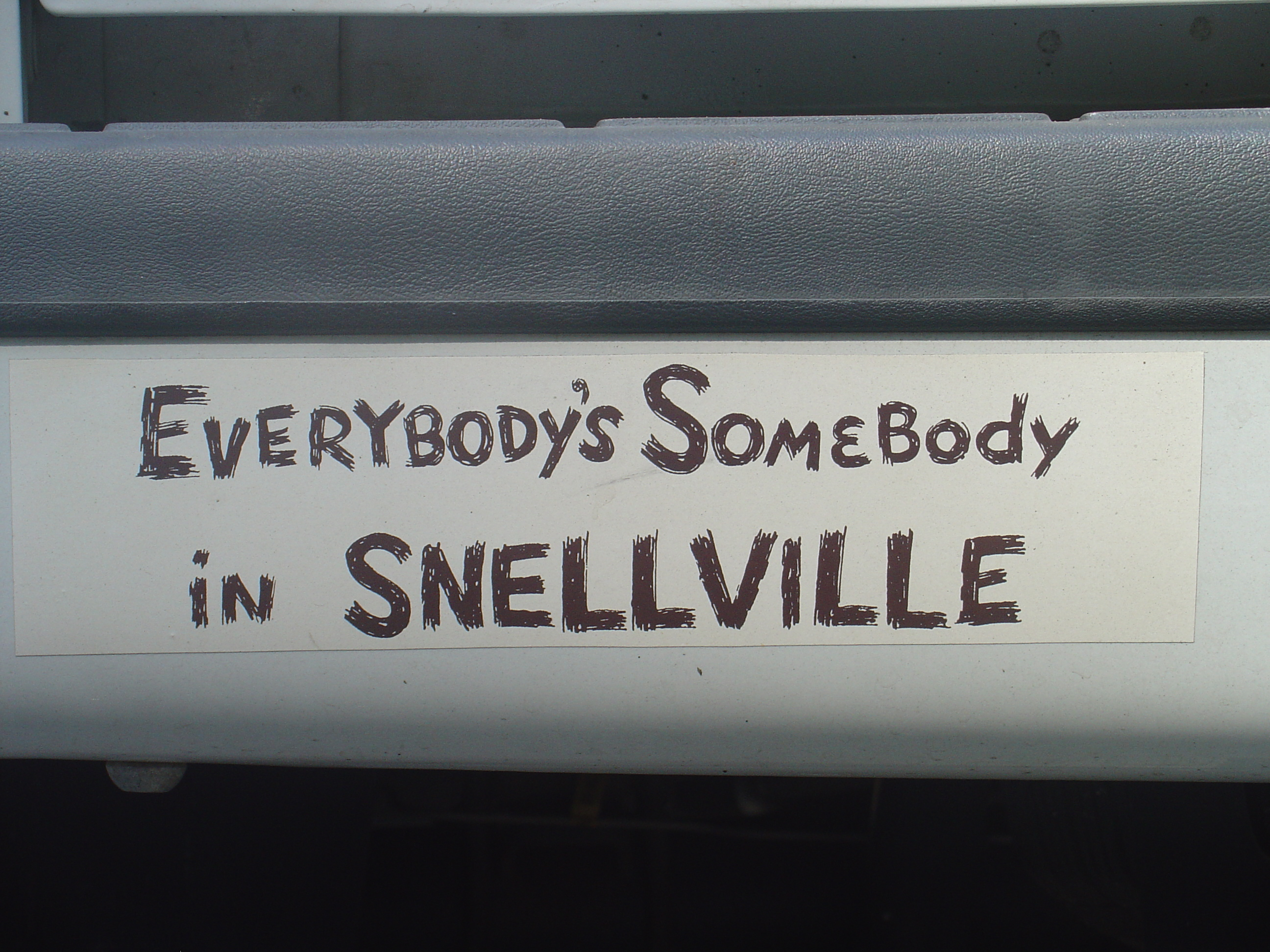
Bumper sticker sold at city hall for $1.

As of the 2020 census, Snellville's population was 20,573. Snellville's political system now includes a mayor and five council members. There are over 100 employees working for the city of Snellville, which operates from five departments: Administration, Parks and Recreation, Planning and Development, Public Safety, and Public Works. The city limits have grown to 10.6 square miles (27.4 km^{2}), and 14 houses of worship are located within the city limits.

==== City land swap ====
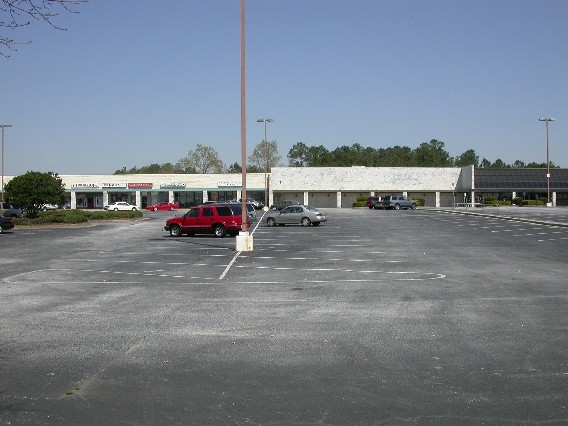
Oakland Village Shopping Center before demolition

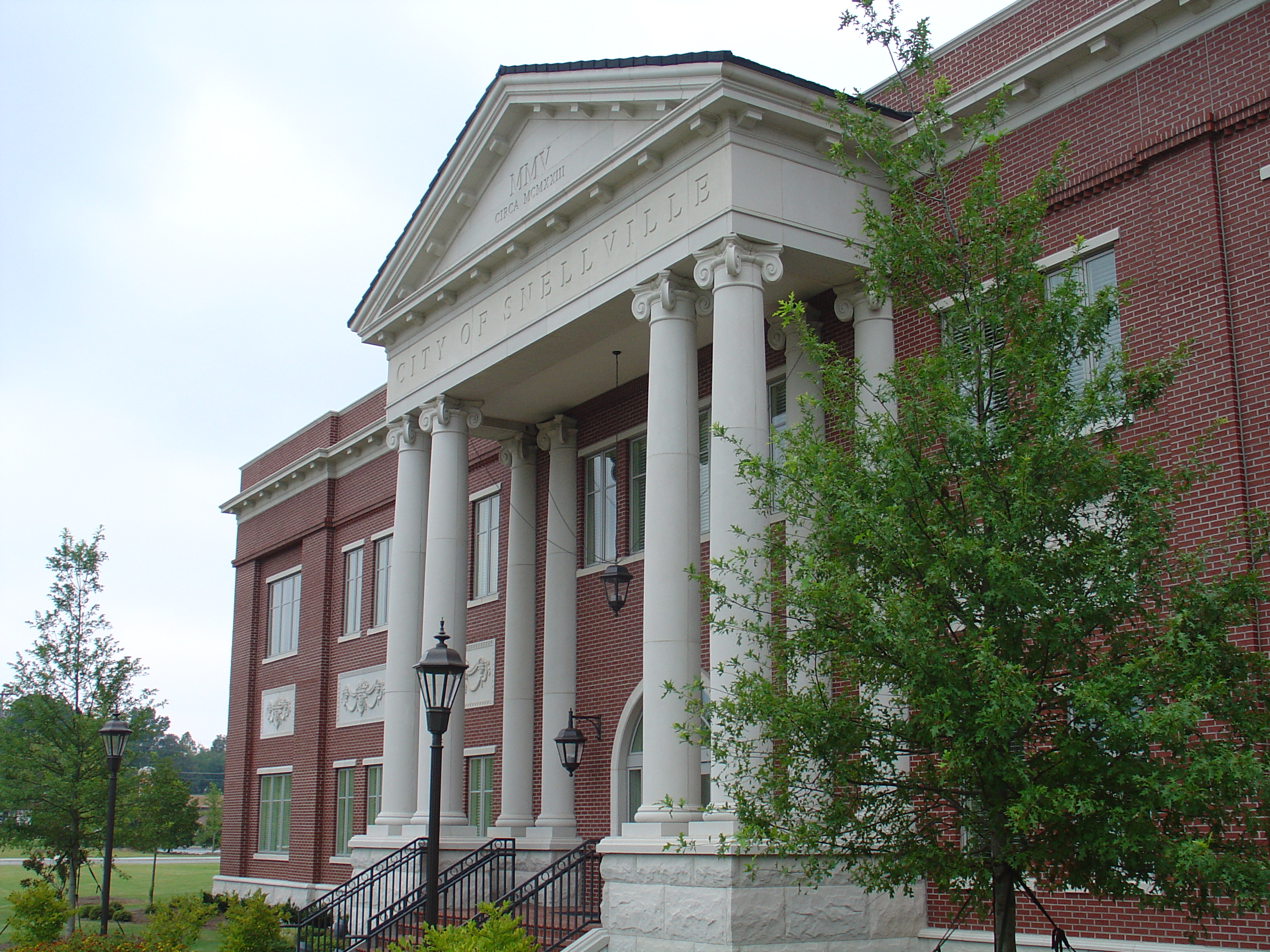
New city hall

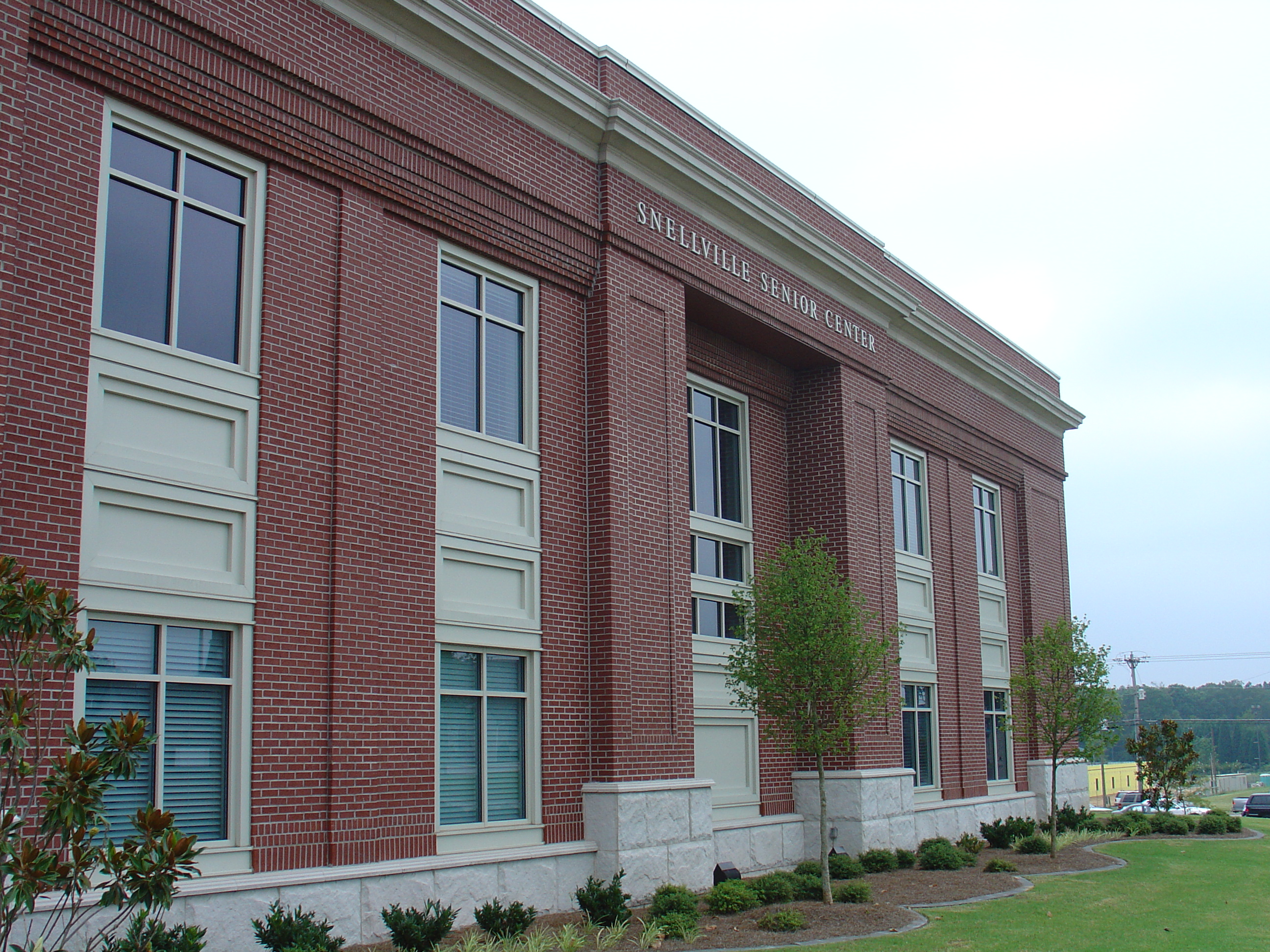
New Senior Citizen Center

In early November 2000, then-Mayor Brett Harrell began negotiating a land swap to transform an abandoned supermarket into a municipal complex and the now-former city hall into part of a church campus. The old Kroger in the Oakland Village Shopping Center on US 78 across from Snellville United Methodist Church and city hall was just one of several dead or dying shopping centers plaguing Snellville. Abandoned big-box stores had become enough of an eyesore to make them a major issue in the 1999 city elections. Harrell had campaigned on a platform that included efforts to revitalize vacant retail space.

The project was not without its opponents. Among the concerned were tenants of the half-occupied Oakland Village Shopping Center that the city would take over, and who would be forced to relocate. The city council voted unanimously that November to proceed with the exploration of a potential land swap. There was concern that timing could become an issue and kill the deal in the early stages. The owner of the shopping center wanted to sell his property by the end of 2000, while the city council decided to take no action for a six-month period. Some citizens expressed concerns about the project at the city council meeting and asked for the deal to be put to a referendum.

On March 5, 2001, the city held its first public hearing on the land swap. Over 100 citizens attended the meeting to support the idea, while more than a dozen showed up to oppose it. A few cited a recent $79,000 roof job on city hall, and the fact that the swap would benefit the church more than the city, as reasons to back out of the deal.

On March 26, 2001, the city council met to vote on the land swap proposal. At this meeting, the citizens were given a few specifics of the deal. According to the council, the Oakland Village Shopping Center was worth $2,700,000, and the current city hall was worth $2,300,000. Councilman Jerry Oberholtzer estimated that renovation of the shopping center for city use would be in the $2,500,000 range. He also estimated that to renovate city hall for future needs would run the city the same cost. More opponents than supporters spoke at the meeting, and a few senior citizens presented a petition against relocating their center which was part of the land swap plan. The City Council voted 3–1 in favor of the swap; Councilman Troy Carter was the only dissenting vote.

As preparation for the swap began, the city hit a snag in June 2001, when a possibility arose of perchloroethylene soil contamination from an old dry cleaner site in the Oakland Village Shopping Center. The Georgia Department of Natural Resources Environmental Protection Division responded that even in the event of contamination, a clean-up may not be required if no one lives close enough to the site or no one is using the ground water in the area. The city did discover the use of a well by a private citizen within a one-mile (1.6 km) radius of the site. This citizen, Harold "Cotton" Willams, refused a $25,000 deal from the Methodist Church to cap the well. In response, the city began exploring a local ordinance banning the construction of new wells and closing any existing ones. The city council voted on June 25 to adopt the ordinance but still allow the use of the well for irrigation. The city council also decided to include the realignment of Oak Road and Henry Clower Boulevard at U.S. 78 in the land swap project.

In July 2001, the land swap hit another snag. A lawyer representing the Nash family of Snellville filed a lawsuit claiming the city could not trade one of the parcels because the city did not own it. The Nash family contended it owned the approximately 1-acre (4,000 m^{2}) tract and the unused building sitting on it. In 1935, Horace J. Nash deeded the building to the Georgia Rural Rehabilitation Corporation for use as a vocational center. The building was used to train unemployed workers during and after the Great Depression. Later, the city used the site for a jail, a senior center and an agricultural building. Most recently, the building housed Recorder's Court. Attorney Bill Crecelius said the Nash family had let Snellville use the building for decades without complaint. This issue was resolved when the city presented documents verifying its ownership of the title to the building as well as title insurance.

In July 2003, the last piece of a $6,700,000 building plan for the project fell into place. The Snellville City Council approved funding for a multipurpose complex combining municipal functions and police services, plus offering a public gathering spot. In a 4–2 vote, the council approved certificates of participation, a series of leases that are to be renewed annually until they are paid off in 20 years. In the final plan, the land swap would include an 8-acre (32,000 m^{2}) project encompassing a new city hall, police department, senior center and public forum area.

Groundbreaking for the new city hall began in March 2004 with the demolition of the Oakland Village Shopping Center. Hogan Construction Group of Norcross was awarded the $7,400,000 contract to construct both the new city hall and new Senior Center. The original completion date was pushed back because of poor weather conditions. Crews also had to blast granite under the building foundation, further delaying the project and adding $200,000 to the cost.

On March 12, 2006, the city officially dedicated the new city hall, located at the corner of Oak Road and Main Street East (US 78). Mayor Jerry Oberholtzer was quoted that arriving at the dedication day took "five years, four elections, three architectural firms, and two lawsuits". The city hopes to one day expand the complex by adding a parking deck and a new public safety annex.

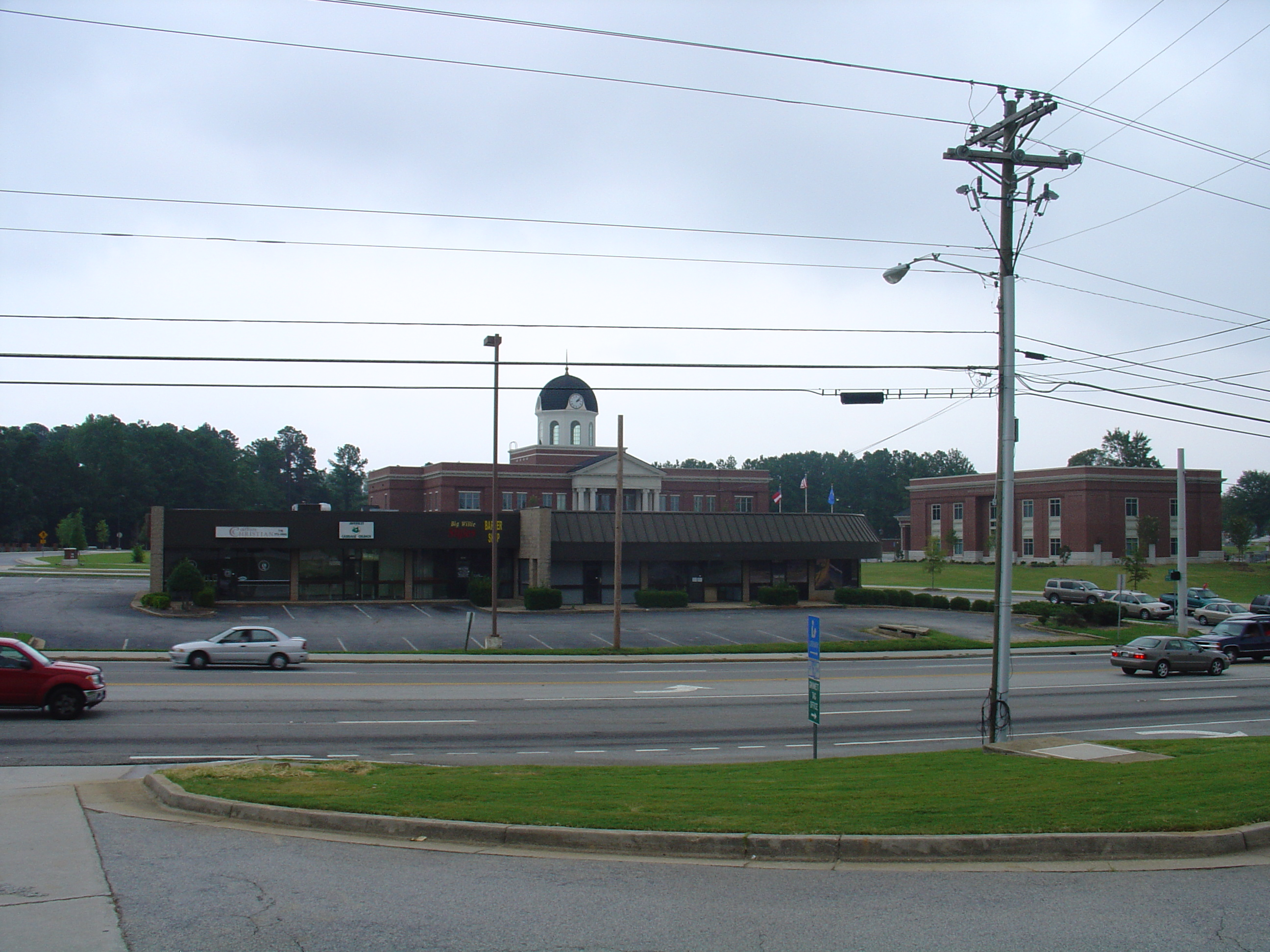
city hall complex with the remaining Oakland Village Shopping Center out-parcel in front

On August 13, 2007, the city council awarded a $52,000 contract to Smithco Construction of Gainesville to demolish and remove the remaining piece of the old Oakland Village Shopping Center. The area has now been converted into an open green space.

==== 2017-2018 City funds misuse controversy ====
Former Mayor Tom Witts had been under close watch since 2013 for alleged tax evasion, owing tens of thousands of dollars in state taxes. On September 7, 2017, Witts was indicted on 66 counts, included allegations that he “consistently underreported income and over-reported deductions” on tax returns; that he used more than half of his 2015 mayoral campaign funds on expenses like cruises, plane tickets, and adult-entertainment websites, and that Witts’ company completed multiple jobs for the city of Snellville, a violation of state law. Witts' original sentence was reduced due to poor health, reducing any jail time to house arrest. Mayor Pro Tem Barbara Bender was to be sworn in as mayor until an election can be called.

=== Towne Center ===
In February 2011, the city of Snellville hired engineering firm Clark, Patterson and Lee in conjunction with renowned urban-planning firm Duany Plater-Zyberk & Company to begin the process of planning a new town center for the suburban community. A weekend-long design charrette was held to engage the community in the process. The plan that emerged from this visioning process provides a new town green and shopping district, bordered by neighborhoods that incorporate a variety of housing types. The plan takes into account the Continuous Flow Intersection that had previously been planned by the Georgia Department of Transportation. A key element of the new town design is a system of bridges and tunnels that create a more walkable city.

== Geography ==
Snellville is located in southern Gwinnett County. U.S. Route 78 runs through the center of the city, leading west 25 miles (40 km) to downtown Atlanta and east 19 miles (31 km) to Monroe. Georgia State Route 124 crosses US 78 in the center of Snellville, leading north 7 miles (11 km) to Lawrenceville and south 13 miles (21 km) to Lithonia. Some unincorporated areas in the eastern edge of DeKalb County and western Rockdale County have a Snellville mailing address, but are not a part of the City of Snellville.

According to the United States Census Bureau, Snellville has a total area of 10.6 square miles (27.4 km^{2}), of which 10.5 square miles (27.1 km^{2}) is land and 0.1 square miles (0.3 km^{2}), or 1.22%, is water.

=== Climate ===
Snellville (along with the rest of the Atlanta metropolitan area) has a humid subtropical climate according to the Köppen classification, with generally hot, humid summers and mild winters by the standards of most of the U.S.

Compared to most large cities around the world at approximately the same latitude (33°39'), such as Beirut, Casablanca, Dallas, Los Angeles, and Phoenix, Snellville has lower average winter temperatures. The primary reason for this is that the North American continent extends into high latitudes that allows systems to form and move eastward and southward without obstruction by major mountain ranges. Other factors include Snellville's distance from large bodies of water; its higher elevation, which can lead to rapid weather changes; prevailing wind patterns; and extensive tree cover, which reduces the urban heat island effect (an advantage during summer).

In the winter, weather systems sweeping south from Canada, through the Midwest, bring temperatures that can reach below 25 °Fahrenheit (−3.9 °Celsius) a few times a year. The lowest temperature recorded in the city is −9 °F (−22 °C), reached on February 13, 1899. It also reached −7 °F (−22 °C) twice and −8 °F (−22 °C) once in Atlanta in the 1980s and 1990s. An average year sees frost on 48 days; snowfall, which occurs most years, averages 2 inches (5 centimeters) annually. The greatest single accumulation of snow was 10 inches (25 centimeters), on January 23, 1940. A more prominent issue in winter are the frequent ice storms that can cause more problems than snow; the most severe such storm may have occurred on January 7, 1973. Also during winter, warm air sometimes flows from the Gulf of Mexico, raising temperatures as high as 75 °F (24 °C).

Though summers are humid, actual temperatures are lower than they may feel, with afternoon highs peaking at about 90 °F (32 °C) in late July. Temperatures rarely reach 100 °F (38 °C), which, during the last 30 years, was recorded in 1980, 1983, 1986, 1993, 1995, 2000, and 2007. The highest temperature recorded in the city is 105 °F (40.6 °C), reached on July 13 and 17, 1980.

Like the rest of the Southeastern U.S., the Atlanta metropolitan area experiences abundant rainfall, which is relatively evenly distributed throughout the year. Average annual rainfall is 50.5 inches (127 centimeters); the only other major U.S. cities with greater rainfall are Miami, Florida, and New Orleans, Louisiana.

Month	Jan	Feb	Mar	Apr	May	Jun	Jul	Aug	Sep	Oct	Nov	Dec	Year
Average high °F (°C)	52 (11)	57 (14)	65 (18)	73 (23)	80 (27)	87 (31)	89 (32)	88 (31)	82 (28)	73 (23)	63 (17)	55 (13)	72 (22)
Average low °F (°C)	34 (1)	37 (3)	45 (7)	50 (10)	59 (15)	66 (19)	72 (22)	70 (21)	64 (18)	54 (12)	45 (7)	36 (2)	52 (11)
Average rainfall: inches (millimeters)	5.03 (127.8)	4.68 (118.9)	5.38 (136.7)	3.62 (91.9)	3.95 (100.3)	3.63 (92.2)	5.12 (130.0)	3.63 (92.2)	4.09 (103.9)	3.11 (79.0)	4.10 (104.1)	3.82 (97.0)	50.16 (1274)

=== Parks ===
Thomas W. Briscoe Park consists of 87 developed acres (100 total acres), just south of the city center on Lenora Church Road. The park hosts numerous activities for youth and seniors including summer camp, swim lessons, soccer and senior trips.

Lenora Park and Disc Golf Course encompasses 112 acres (0.45 km^{2}) of land on Lenora Church Road.

South Gwinnett Athletic Association consists of six baseball and softball fields, one football field, and 40,000 square feet of indoor sporting rink use for roller hockey, volleyball, indoor soccer, and lacrosse.

== Demographics ==
Historical population
Census	Pop.	Note	%±
1930	105		—
1940	204		94.3%
1950	309		51.5%
1960	468		51.5%
1970	1,990		325.2%
1980	8,514		327.8%
1990	12,084		41.9%
2000	15,351		27.0%
2010	18,242		18.8%
2020	20,573		12.8%
2025 (est.)	22,478	▲	9.3%
U.S. Decennial Census; 2025

=== 2020 census ===
As of the 2020 census, Snellville had a population of 20,573. The median age was 40.4 years. 24.3% of residents were under the age of 18 and 18.3% of residents were 65 years of age or older. For every 100 females there were 87.3 males, and for every 100 females age 18 and over there were 82.3 males age 18 and over.

100.0% of residents lived in urban areas, while 0.0% lived in rural areas.

There were 6,959 households in Snellville, including 4,853 families. Of all households, 37.6% had children under the age of 18 living in them. 52.2% were married-couple households, 11.8% were households with a male householder and no spouse or partner present, and 30.8% were households with a female householder and no spouse or partner present. About 19.5% of all households were made up of individuals and 10.1% had someone living alone who was 65 years of age or older.

There were 7,251 housing units, of which 4.0% were vacant. The homeowner vacancy rate was 1.7% and the rental vacancy rate was 5.7%.

Racial composition as of the 2020 census
Race	Number	Percent
White	7,979	38.8%
Black or African American	8,131	39.5%
American Indian and Alaska Native	131	0.6%
Asian	1,257	6.1%
Native Hawaiian and Other Pacific Islander	11	0.1%
Some other race	1,237	6.0%
Two or more races	1,827	8.9%
Hispanic or Latino (of any race)	2,649	12.9%

== Culture ==
=== Snellville Days Festival ===
The Snellville Days Festival is a two-day event held annually that draws crowds from all over the Southeast. The annual celebration is touted as being one of the top 20 tourism events in May according to the Southeastern Tourism Society, but still has a small-town flavor.

== Education ==
=== Schools ===
==== Public schools ====
The following schools serve the Snellville area and are part of the Gwinnett County Public Schools:

- Brookwood High School
  - Alton C. Crews Middle School
    - Brookwood Elementary School
    - Craig Elementary School
  - Five Forks Middle School
    - Gwinn Oaks Elementary School
    - R. D. Head Elementary School
- Grayson High School
  - J. P. McConnell Middle School
    - Pharr Elementary School
    - W. J. Cooper Elementary School
  - Bay Creek Middle School
    - Grayson Elementary
    - Trip Elementary
- Shiloh High School
  - Shiloh Middle School
    - Anderson-Livsey Elementary School
    - Annistown Elementary School
    - Centerville Elementary School
    - Shiloh Elementary School
    - Henry Partee Elementary School
- South Gwinnett High School
  - Grace Snell Middle School
    - J.C. Magill Elementary School
    - Rosebud Elementary School
  - Snellville Middle School
    - R. L. Norton Elementary School
    - W. C. Britt Elementary School

==== Private schools ====
- Evergreen Montessori School
- Gwinnett Christian Academy, grades K5–12
- Harbour Oaks Montessori School, grades K2–12

=== Public libraries ===
Gwinnett County Public Library operates the Elizabeth H. Williams Branch in Snellville.

== Government and politics ==
The city of Snellville operates under a council-manager form of government. The city manager is appointed by the council and works with them on policy creation and then manages staff concerning implementation. Comparing this form of government to a private business, the mayor acts as chairman of the board and the city council acts as the board of directors. The city manager, under the direction of the city council, manages the day-to-day functions of the city. The city's mayor, Tom Witts, was elected to a four-year term in 2015. In late 2018, Mayor Witts was suspended (following his 2017 indictment) due to misuse of funds, spending them on travel and adult websites.

=== Elections ===
Every two years, half of the elected council is up for election. In 2017, three city council seats will be up for election.

Unlike the county, state, and national elections, where voting is done by precinct, all city elections take place at city hall.

== Infrastructure ==
=== Transportation ===
==== Major roads ====
- U.S. Route 78
- State Route 84
- State Route 124
- Ronald Reagan Parkway

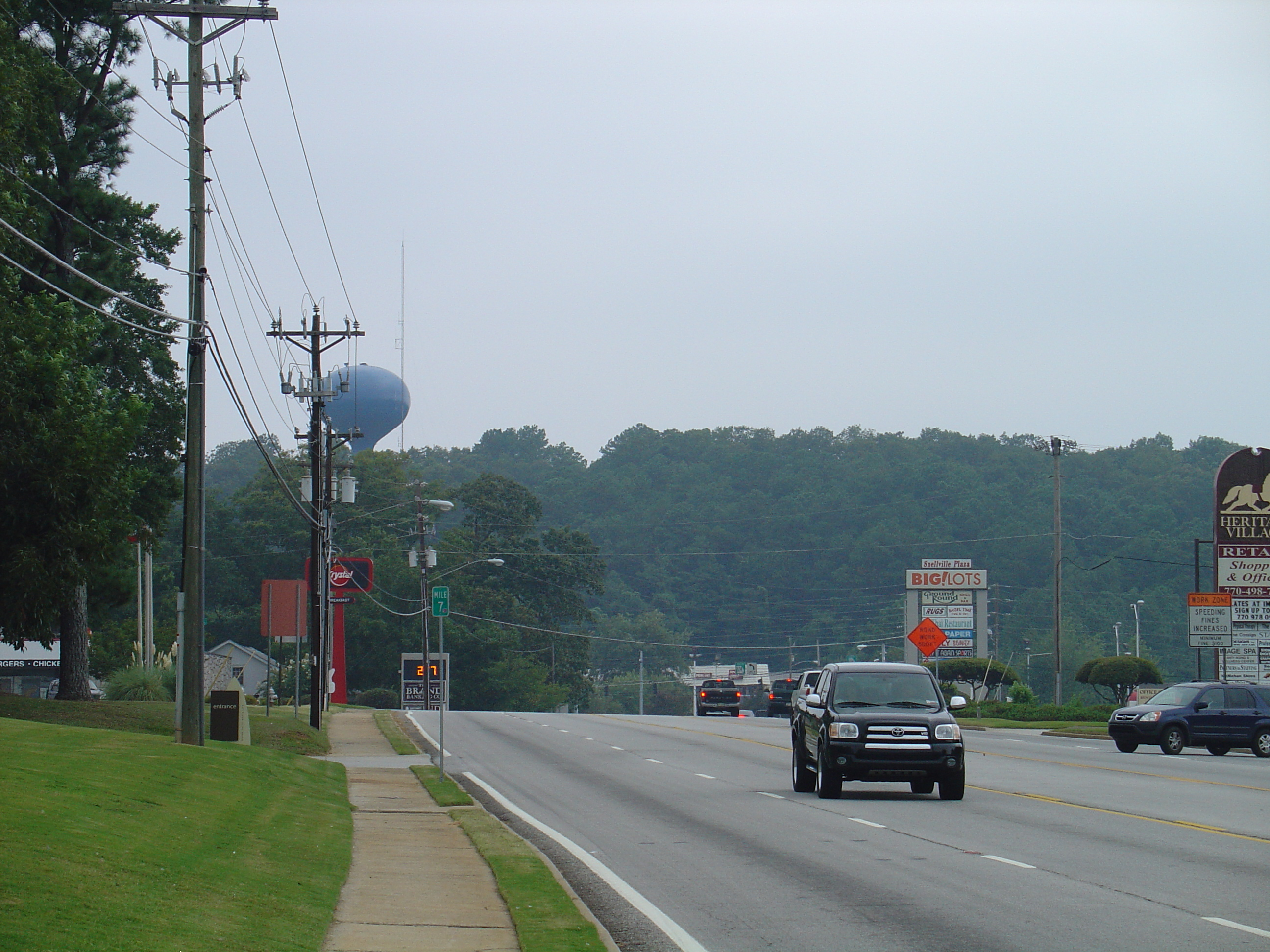
U.S. 78 looking west toward the city center

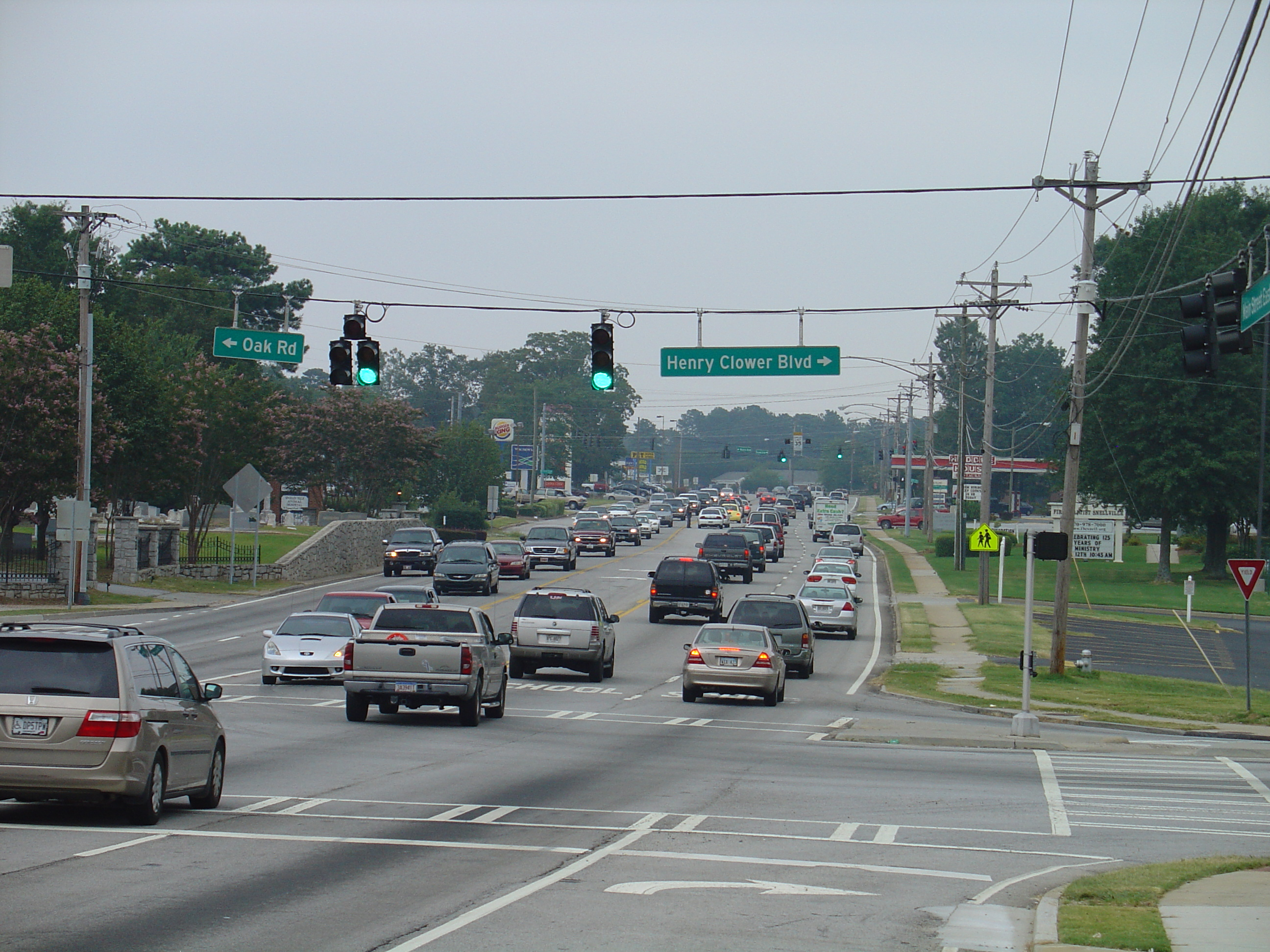
U.S. 78 looking east from the city center toward Loganville

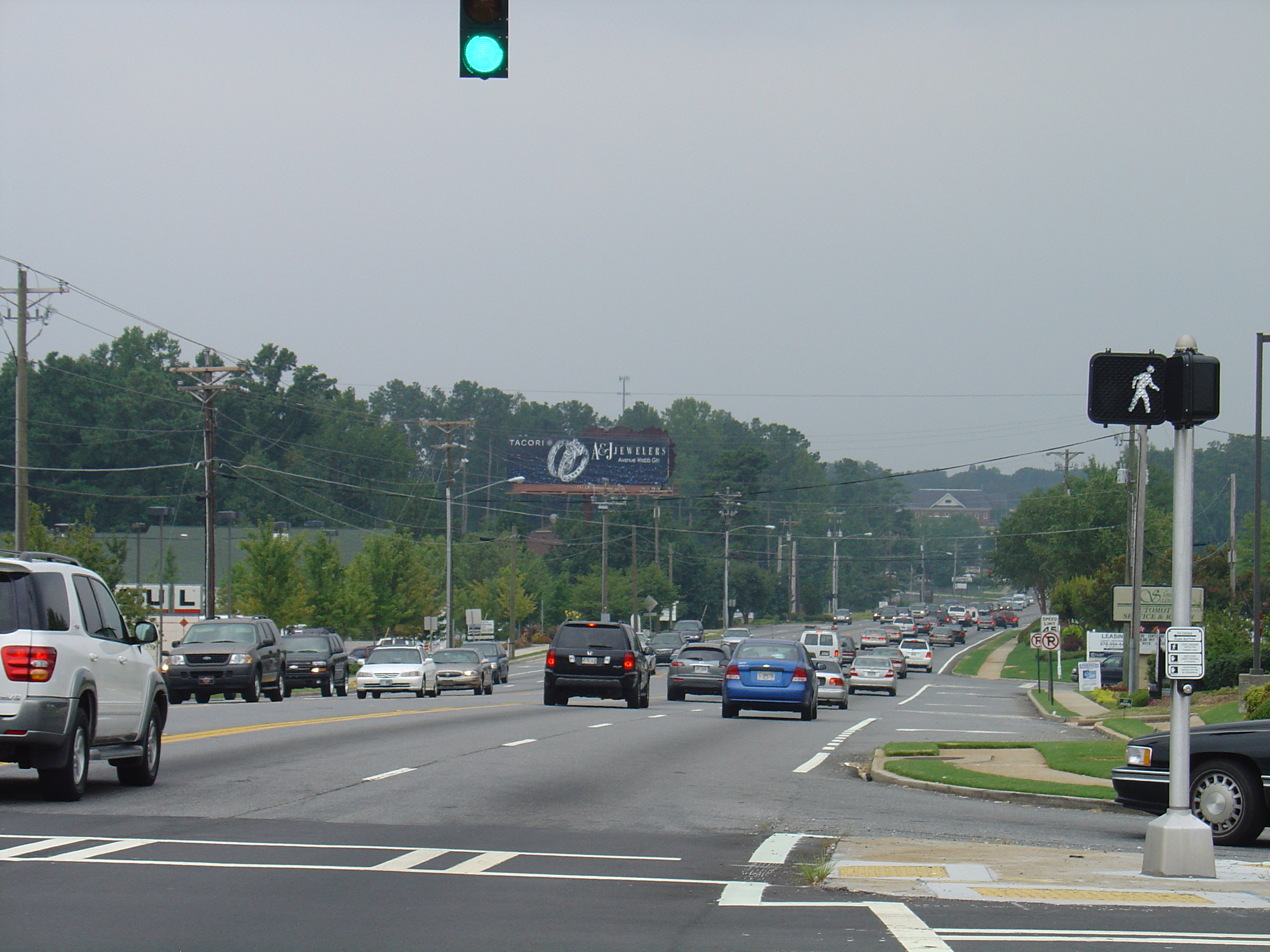
State Route 124 looking south toward the city center from Dogwood Road

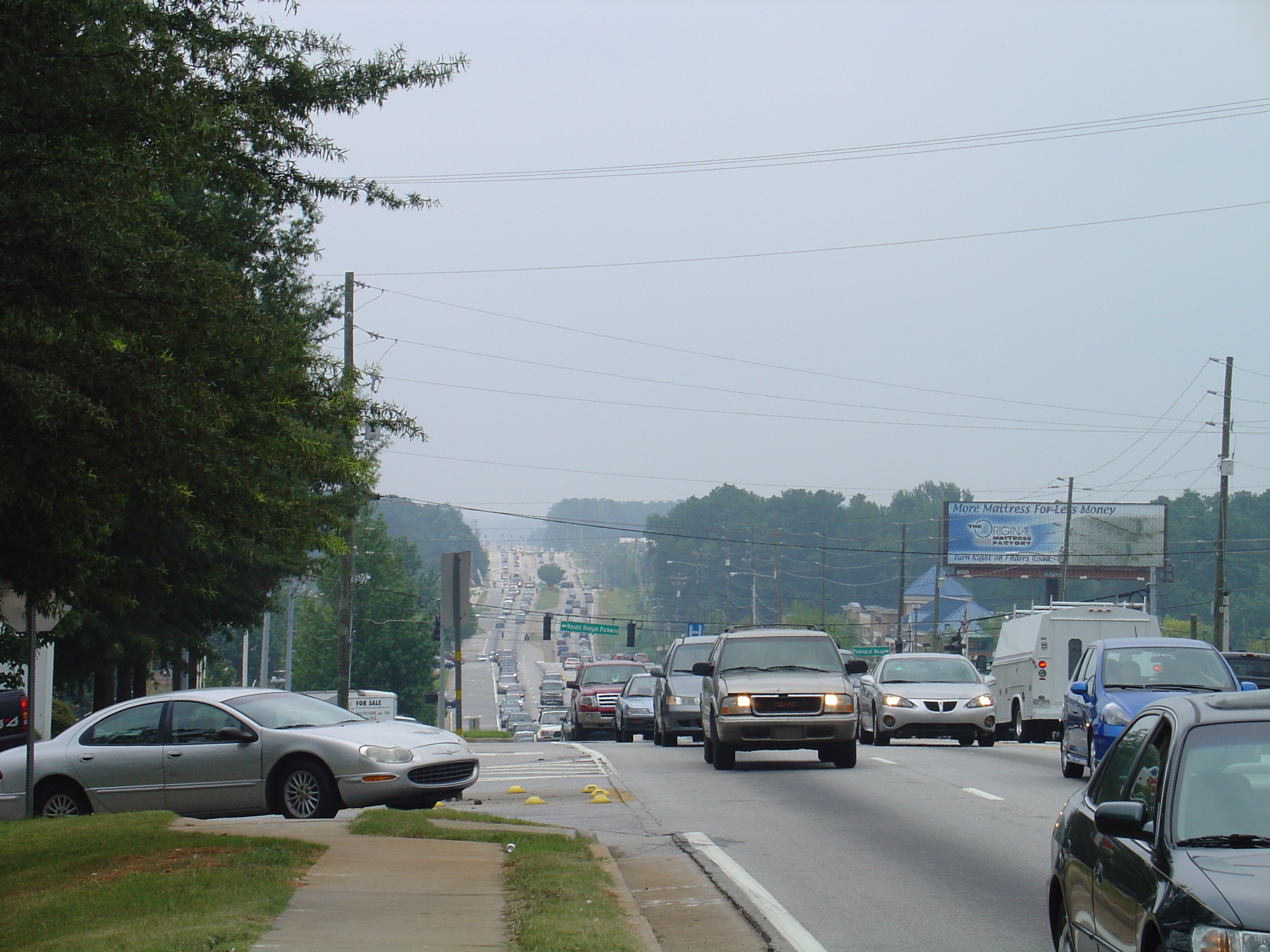
State Route 124 looking north toward Lawrenceville from Dogwood Road

==== Pedestrians and cycling ====
- Ivy Creek-Snellville Trail (Proposed)

==== Public transportation ====
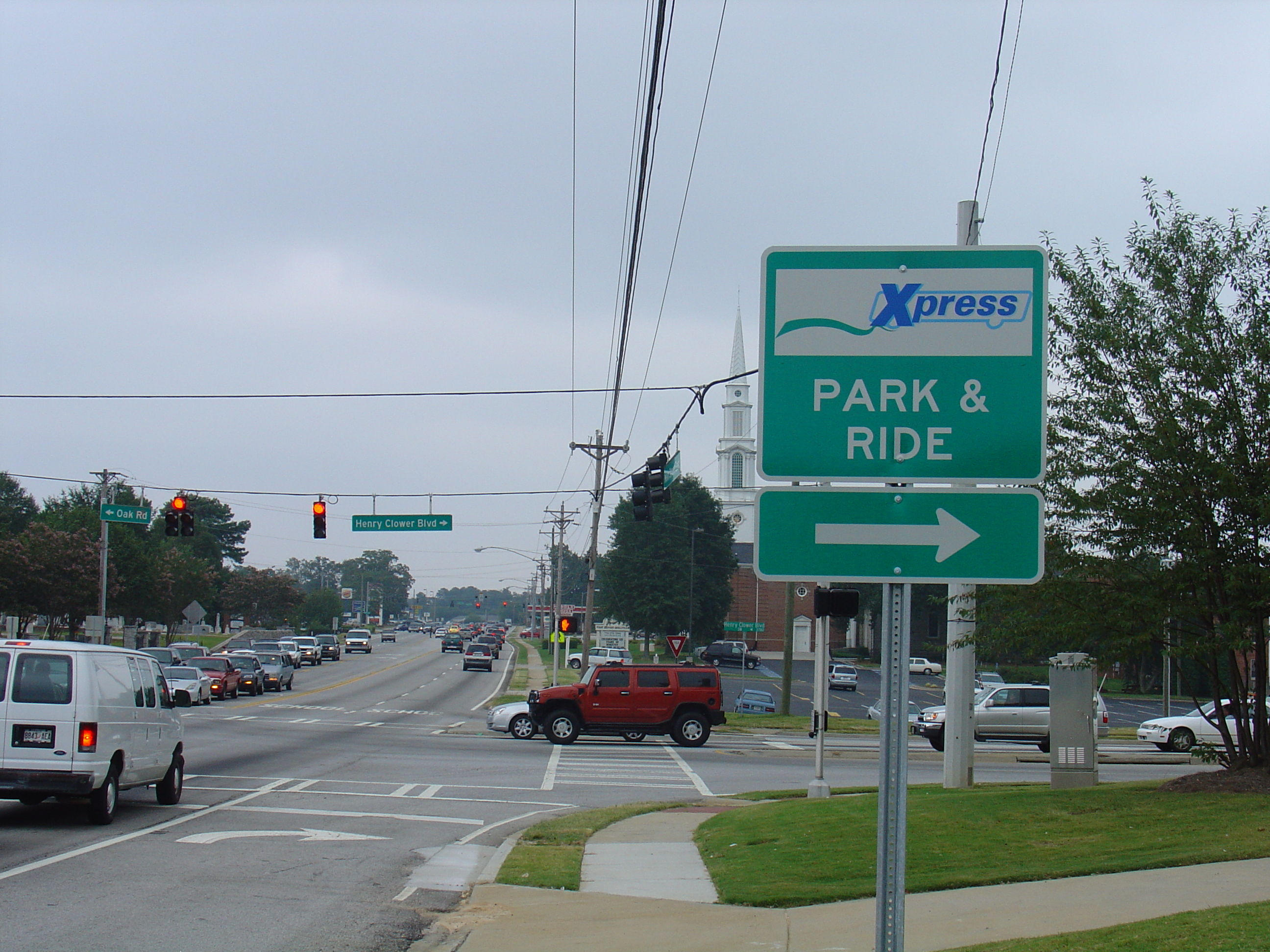
Xpress Bus park & ride at the First Baptist Church of Snellville

Route 418 of the Xpress bus service, a joint venture between Ride Gwinnett and the Georgia Regional Transportation Authority (GRTA), provides commuter bus service to downtown Atlanta from Snellville in the morning, and vice versa in the afternoon. Seven departure times are available in the morning and seven in the afternoon, Monday-Friday, via Stone Mountain Freeway (U.S. 78) to I-285 and I-20. The morning westbound route terminates at the Civic Center MARTA Station. The afternoon eastbound route terminates at the First Baptist Church of Snellville, with a stop at the Hewatt Road Park&Ride.

Ride Gwinnett is also testing a micro-transit service in the Snellville area.

===== History =====
Buses first ran on the morning of April 2, 2007. In that first month, the route had a total of 1,783 riders. In May, a 40% increase to 2,520 occurred. On many mornings, the bus is standing room only. On August 21, 2007, the Gwinnett County Board of Commissioners approved an agreement with GRTA to add five new Motor Coach Industries D4500CL buses to the route.

=== Medical centers ===
Snellville has one major hospital, Piedmont Eastside Medical Center, formerly Emory Eastside Medical Center, which serves the southern Gwinnett County Region.

=== Media ===
==== Newspapers ====
- Atlanta Journal-Constitution (major regional paper)
- Gwinnett Daily Post

== Notable people ==
- Matt Beaty, baseball player
- Clay Cook, singer/songwriter, member of the Zac Brown Band, writer of songs for John Mayer
- Rennie Curran, football player for the Tennessee Titans
- Diana DeGarmo, 2004 American Idol runner-up
- David Greene, football player for the New England Patriots
- Kyle Lewis, baseball player
- Josh Okogie, professional basketball player
- Melissa Ordway, actress; plays Abby Newman on The Young and the Restless
- David Pollack, football player for the Cincinnati Bengals
- Amy Robach, Good Morning America news anchor
- Cameron Sample, professional football player for the Cincinnati Bengals
- Nakia Sanford (1995), former forward/center in the WNBA
- Eric Shanteau, member of USA swim team, 2008 Summer Olympics
- Sound Tribe Sector 9, band now located in the Bay Area of California
- Ella Stevens, soccer player
- Lou Williams, former basketball player
- Garrett Whitlock, American professional baseball player
- Owen Wolff, soccer player
- Tyler Wolff, soccer player
