= Cavaliers–Warriors rivalry =

National Basketball Association rivalry

- Cleveland Cavaliers Golden State Warriors
- First meeting: October 17, 1970; GSW 128, CLE 108
- Latest meeting: April 2, 2026; CLE 118, GSW 111
- Next meeting: December 12, 2026

Statistics
- Total meetings: 147
- All-time series: 84–64 (GSW)
- Regular season series: 69–57 (GSW)
- Postseason results: 16–6 (GSW)
- Longest win streak: GSW W19
- Current win streak: CLE W1

Postseason history
- 2015 NBA Finals: GSW won, 4–2; 2016 NBA Finals: CLE won, 4–3; 2017 NBA Finals: GSW won, 4–1; 2018 NBA Finals: GSW won, 4–0

Locations of the Cleveland Cavaliers and Golden State Warriors.

The Cavaliers–Warriors rivalry is a National Basketball Association (NBA) rivalry between the Cleveland Cavaliers and the Golden State Warriors. The rivalry became prominent in the mid-to-late 2010s, with the two teams facing each other in four consecutive NBA Finals from 2015 to 2018. In the four Finals, the Warriors won three championships and the Cavaliers won one.

== History ==
=== Early history ===
The Warriors dominated the early series, going 37–22 (.627) from 1970 to 1991. The Cavaliers would win 10 straight games from 1992 to 1996 to reduce Golden State's lead to 37–32 (.536). The two teams played each other close during LeBron James' first stint with the Cavaliers in the 2000s.

The 2006–07 season was a memorable season for both teams, as the Warriors qualified for the 8th seed and became the first 8-seeded team to eliminate a 1-seed in a best-of-7 series, as they did in the 2007 first round against the Dallas Mavericks. On the other hand, the Cavaliers reached their first NBA Finals, where they were swept by the San Antonio Spurs. The Cavaliers' playoffs run was highlighted by LeBron James' epic performance in Game 5 of the Eastern Conference Finals versus the 1-seed Detroit Pistons, with James scoring the Cavaliers' last 25 points, while sending the game to double overtime. Two years later, on January 23, 2009, LeBron James scored a game-winning buzzer beater over the Golden State Warriors, months before Stephen Curry joined the NBA.

From 2010 to 2014, James left the Cavaliers to play for the Miami Heat to team up with Dwyane Wade and Chris Bosh. The Heat went to the Finals each year, winning championships in 2012 and 2013, while the Warriors were a lottery team. The Cavaliers used their first pick in 2011 to draft Kyrie Irving from Duke University. However, the Warriors won both games against the Cavaliers that season with a rookie Klay Thompson and Curry, both of whom were instrumental in the success the Warriors would experience later that decade.

The Warriors led the head-to-head series 53–50 (.515) through the end of the 2013–14 season.

James returned to the Cavaliers during the 2014 off-season. The Cavaliers then acquired All-Star power forward Kevin Love from the Minnesota Timberwolves for Andrew Wiggins and Anthony Bennett. The Cavaliers quickly became the favorite to win the East, as they already had an All-Star point guard in Kyrie Irving and other rising stars such as Tristan Thompson.

In the Western Conference, the Warriors were a team led by their backcourt of the "Splash Brothers", Curry and Thompson, and a developed fast-paced, up-tempo offense, consisting mainly of three point shooting.

=== 2014–15 season: Warriors win first NBA title in 40 years ===
With LeBron James returning to the Cavaliers as a free agent in 2014, the team was favored to make it to the NBA Finals. The team started off the season poorly, with Love struggling in his new role and SG Dion Waiters unable to handle being relegated to a secondary role. The Cavaliers started off the season with a record of 19–20. James missed two weeks in January (which was his longest absence at the time) with back and knee injuries. Later that month, the Cavaliers traded away Waiters to the Oklahoma City Thunder in a three-team deal with the New York Knicks. They acquired three-point specialist J. R. Smith and defensive asset Iman Shumpert. The team also acquired center and rim protector Timofey Mozgov in a separate trade. These players were critical for the team's return to the top of the Eastern Conference.

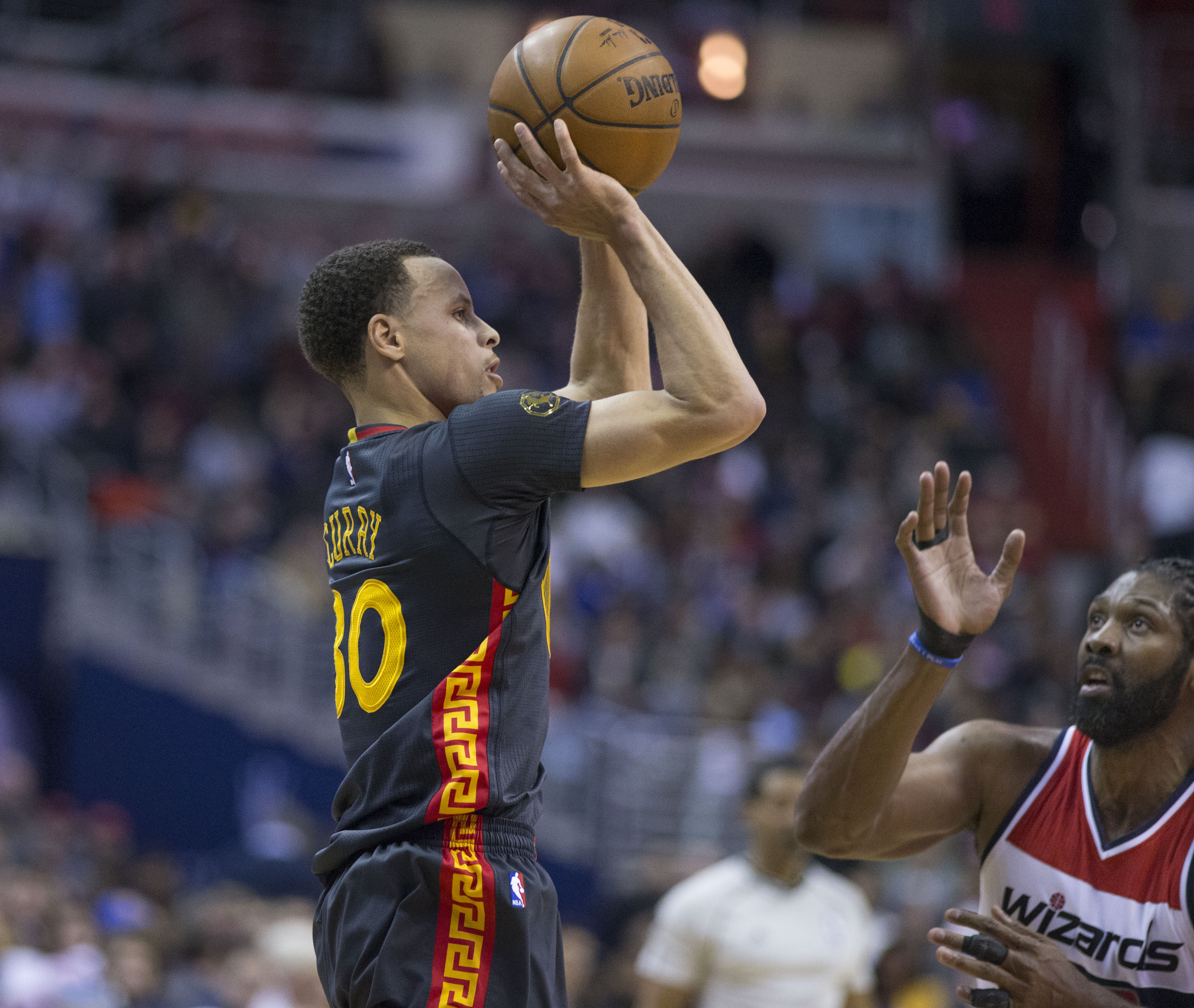
Stephen Curry (pictured) of the Warriors won his first Most Valuable Player Award in 2015.

The Warriors started off the season 21–2, with a 16-game winning streak, which made them the early title favorites. Stephen Curry immediately became a Most Valuable Player candidate. Curry was improving off of last year's All-Star season. Klay Thompson became one of the best shooting guards, three-point shooters, and two-way players in the league. Draymond Green averaged about 12 points, 8 rebounds, and 4 assists per game. Rookie head coach Steve Kerr was a candidate for Coach of the Year.

The two teams split their head-to-head meetings that season, each winning on its home court.

James, Irving, Curry, and Thompson were all named to their respective NBA All-Star teams, with Curry finishing first in the All-Star voting (1,513,324), and LeBron James finishing in second (1,470,483). Curry won the NBA MVP Award, averaging 23.8 points, 7.7 assists, and 2.0 steals per game, and shot 44.3% from three-point territory. James was third in MVP voting. He averaged 25.3 PPG, 6.0 RPG, and 7.4 APG. They were featured on the All-NBA First Team. Irving and Thompson made the All-NBA team as well. The Cavaliers finished the season with a record of 53–29, and the Warriors finished the season with a record of 67–15.

The Warriors and the Cavaliers only lost five games combined in the first three rounds of the playoffs. For the first time in NBA Finals history, both teams were coached by rookie head coaches with Steve Kerr and David Blatt. The Cavaliers faced injury trouble, losing Love in Game 4 of the first round against the Boston Celtics to a separated shoulder. Irving left Game 1 of the Finals in overtime after fracturing his left kneecap. The Warriors won Game 1 in a 108–100 overtime thriller. Game 2 also went into overtime, the all-around efforts of LeBron James and Matthew Dellavedova's surprisingly stellar defense on Steph Curry took the game 95–93. James had carried the limping Cavaliers to a Game 3 win and a 2–1 lead over the Warriors. The Warriors would win the next three games to take home the 2015 NBA Championship. Andre Iguodala would win the NBA Finals MVP, although James averaged 35.8 PPG, 13.3 RPG, and 8.8 APG in a losing effort. However, he shot less than 40% from the field for the entire series.

=== 2015–16 season: Warriors' 73-win season, Cleveland's first title ends drought ===
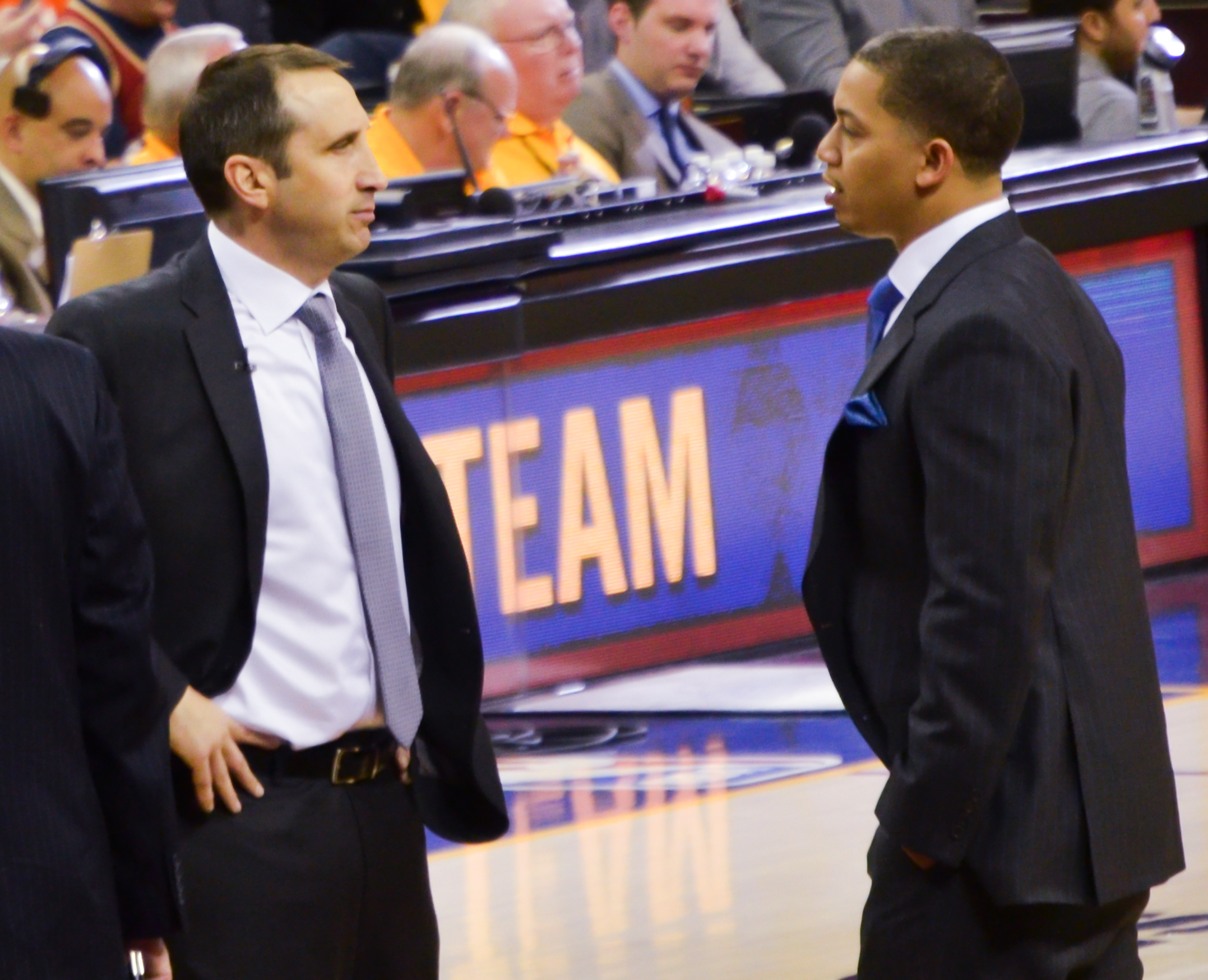
The 2015–16 Cleveland Cavaliers season saw the firing of head coach David Blatt (left), who would be replaced by assistant coach Tyronn Lue (right).

The Warriors opened the 2015–16 season going 24–0, the most wins without a loss to start a season in NBA history and the third-longest winning streak in NBA history (33, by the 1971–72 Los Angeles Lakers and 27, by the 2012-13 Miami Heat). By the All-Star break, the Warriors' record was a stellar 48–4, including a pair of regular season victories against Cleveland. One notable game was on MLK day where Stephen Curry dropped 35 points en route to a blowout 132–98 victory. This was the best record at an All–Star break in league history. Curry, Thompson, and Draymond Green earned all-star selections. Golden State went on to break the 1995–96 Chicago Bulls' 72–10 season record by winning 73 games. Stephen Curry became the first unanimous MVP in the history of the NBA that year.

Despite their regular season dominance, the Warriors struggled in the Western Conference playoffs. After defeating the Houston Rockets and Portland Trail Blazers each in five games without Curry for several games due to injuries, the Warriors were pushed to seven games by the Oklahoma City Thunder in the Western Conference Finals. The Thunder jumped to a 3–1 lead, but the Warriors were able to battle their way back and win the series.

The Cavaliers faced some challenges in the 2015–16 campaign. Irving was recovering from a knee injury sustained in Game 1 of the previous season's Finals and would miss most of the first half of the season. Despite some hardship, Cleveland performed well throughout the first half of the season. Halfway through the campaign, with a record of 30–11, head coach David Blatt was replaced by Tyronn Lue. The team finished the regular season with the best record in the Eastern Conference with 57 wins, sweeping the Detroit Pistons and Atlanta Hawks, and defeated the Toronto Raptors in 6 games to advance to the Finals against the defending champion Warriors.

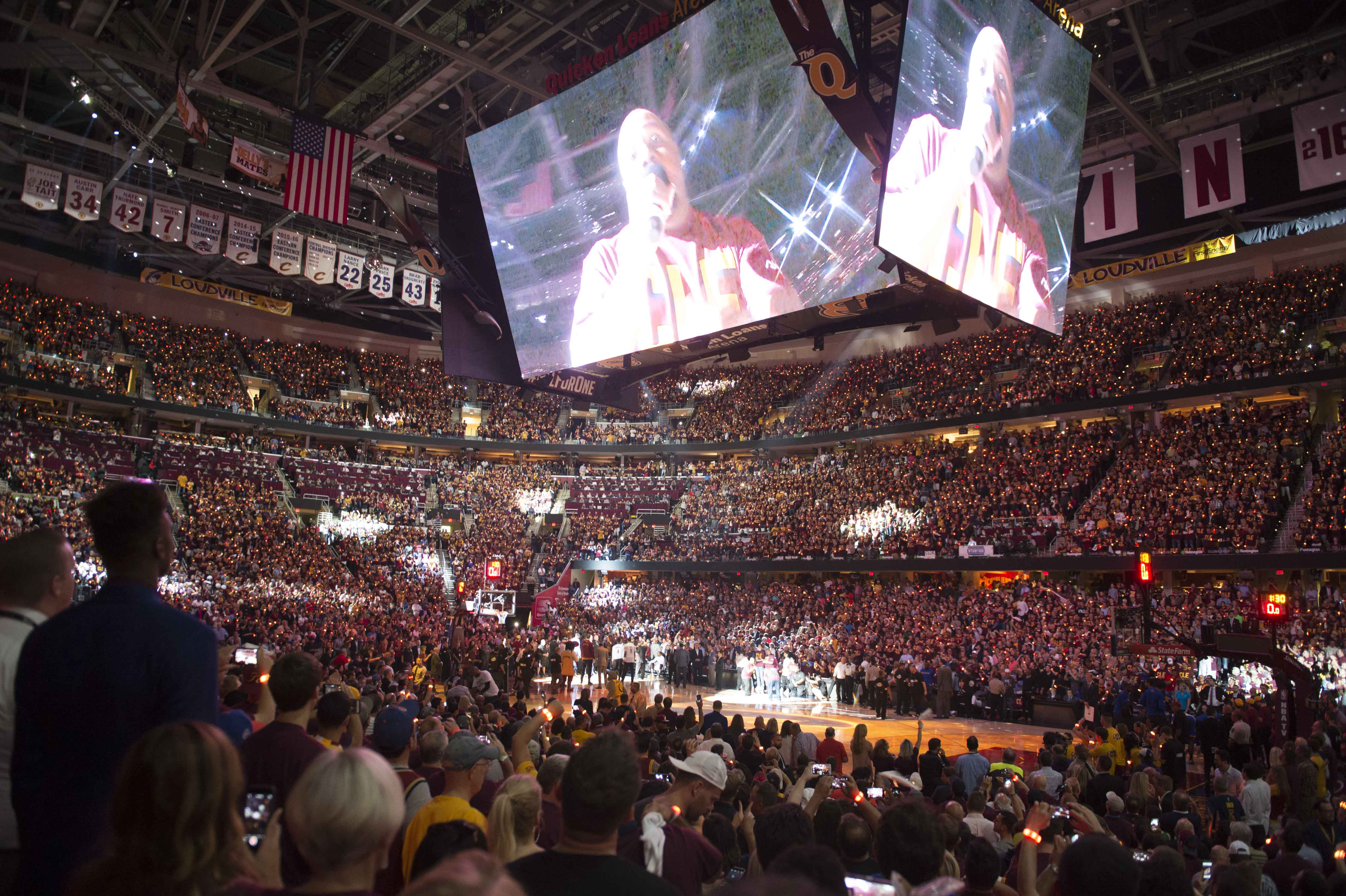
Inside Quicken Loans Arena in Cleveland before the start of Game 4 of the 2016 NBA Finals.

The 2016 NBA Finals saw the Cavaliers and Warriors meet for the second straight season. The Warriors won Games 1 and 2 in Oakland quite convincingly before the series moved to Cleveland. While Cleveland won Game 3 at home in convincing fashion, the Warriors took Game 4 to set up a potential series-clincher at home. During the game, Draymond Green committed a flagrant foul on LeBron James. After reviewing the incident post-game, the league determined that the altercation warranted a flagrant 1 foul, which put Green over the NBA's flagrant foul limit and meant that he would be suspended for Game 5.

Kyrie Irving and LeBron James both scored 41 points in Game 5 to stay alive on the road, becoming the first pair of teammates to score at least 40 points in a Finals game. Back in Cleveland, LeBron James continued his explosive scoring, tallying another 41-point game in a Game 6 rout of the Warriors that saw a dominating 31–9 opening sequence and a late-game ejection of Stephen Curry. James became the first player since Shaquille O'Neal to score over 40 points in back-to-back NBA Finals games. Curry was also the first player, also since O'Neal, to foul out in a Finals game.

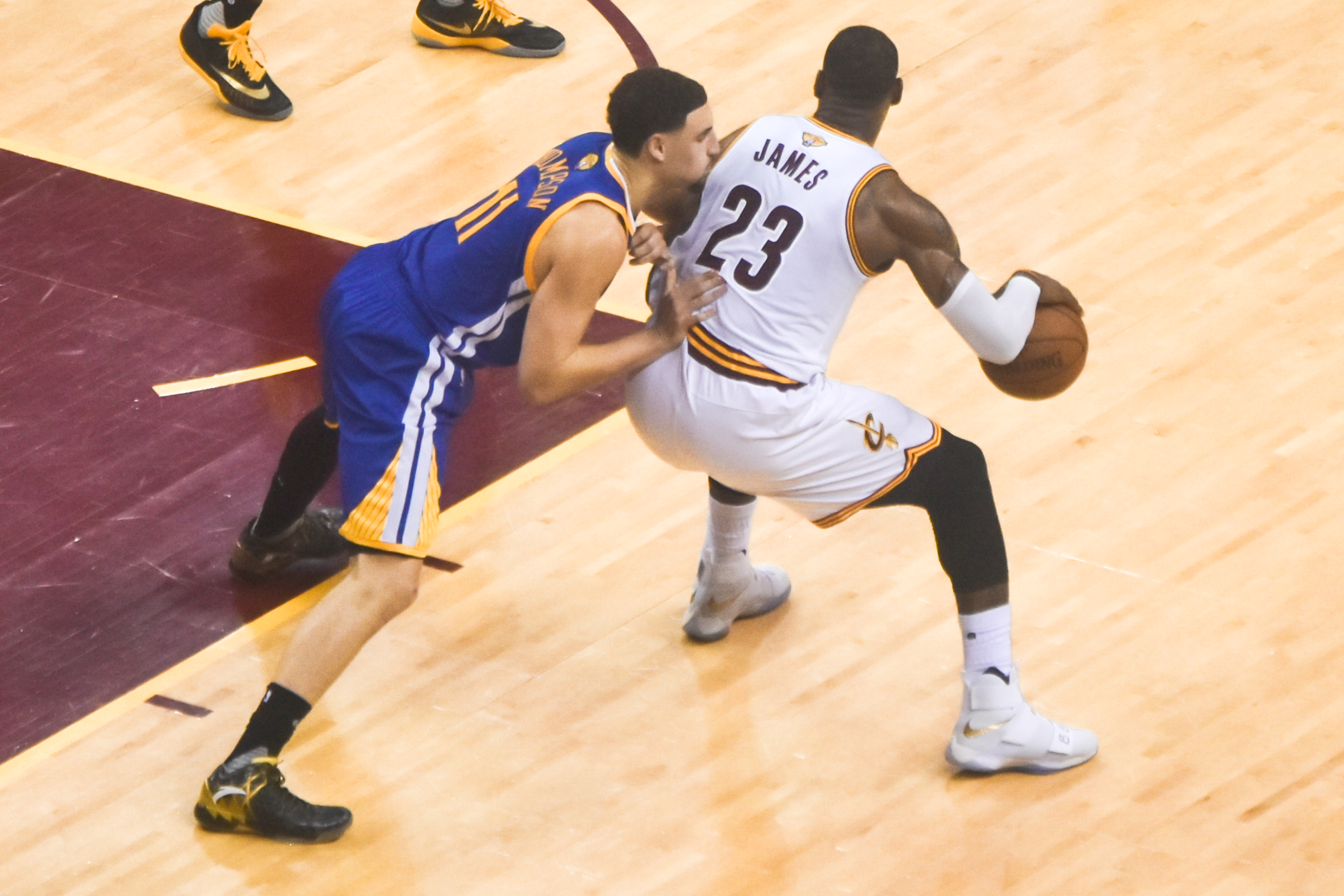
LeBron James (right) posts up Klay Thompson (left) at the 2016 NBA Finals.

With the series shifting back to Oracle Arena for the championship decider, the Warriors and the Cavaliers were neck-and-neck for most of Game 7. With a little over a minute and fifty seconds left in the 4th quarter, and with the score tied 89–89, LeBron James made a memorable chase-down block on Andre Iguodala to save a go-ahead basket. Soon after, Kyrie Irving hit a 3-pointer over Stephen Curry to give Cleveland the lead, and Kevin Love locking down Curry. In the end, they held on to win the game 93–89. This was Cleveland's first franchise title and made them first team in NBA Finals history to come back from a 1–3 deficit. LeBron James became only the third player in NBA history to have a triple double in a Finals Game 7 and was unanimously voted Finals MVP after leading in all five categories of points, rebounds, assists, steals, and blocks.

=== 2016–2018: Arrival of Kevin Durant, Warriors win back-to-back titles ===
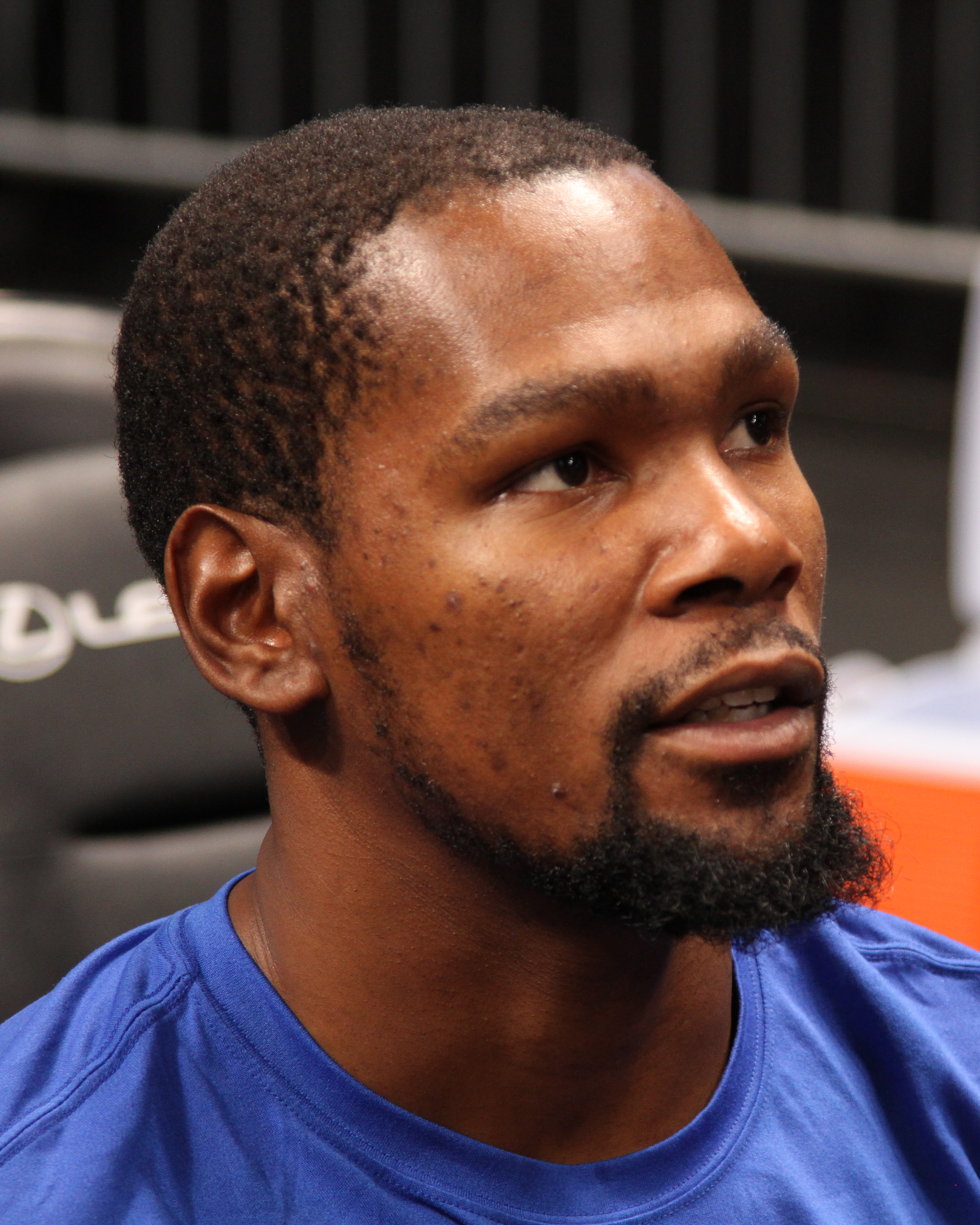
The Warriors continued their dominance with the signing of Kevin Durant (pictured) for the 2016–17 season.

On July 4, 2016, Oklahoma City Thunder star Kevin Durant signed with the Warriors in free agency. He averaged 25.1 PPG, 8.3 RPG, 4.8 APG, 1.1 SPG, and 1.6 BPG. After losing the Christmas game 108–109, the Warriors got their revenge on MLK Day at home by once again blowing out the Cavaliers 126–91. After finishing 67–15, the first team in NBA history to win at least 67 games in three straight seasons, the Warriors went 12–0 in the Western Conference playoffs. They became the 3rd team in league history to sweep all three rounds after the Los Angeles Lakers (1988–89 and 2000–01), doing it against the Portland Trail Blazers, Utah Jazz, and San Antonio Spurs, and the 1st to do so going 12–0 (the previous teams went 11–0 when the first round was best-of-five).

In the Eastern Conference, the Cavaliers willfully made it to the Finals, going 12–1, cruising past the Indiana Pacers and Toronto Raptors in convincing series sweeps. In the Conference Finals, the Cavaliers defeated the Boston Celtics in five games. James entered the Finals averaging 32.5 PPG, 8.0 RPG, 7.0 APG, 2.2 SPG, and 1.4 BPG. He shot 57% from the field and 42% from three. James averaged a triple-double in the Finals. Kevin Love also played his best basketball as a Cavalier, averaging 17.2 PPG 10.4 RPG, 1.9 APG, shooting 46% from the field, and 44% on 3 pointers. Kyrie Irving set a career playoff-high 42 points during Game 4 of the Eastern Conference Finals against Boston. The Warriors and Cavaliers had a combined 24–1 record entering the Finals, the fewest combined losses entering the Finals ever.

The series faced high anticipation as the Warriors, now dubbed as a "super-team", looked for revenge on their East coast foe from the previous year's loss. The Warriors easily took Games 1 and 2 at home, defeating the Cavaliers 113–91, and 132–113. Game 3 looked to be in the Cavs' favor, until an 11–0 run by the Warriors in the closing minutes emerged, capped off by a dagger three from Kevin Durant to seal a 118–113 comeback victory. Down 0–3, James and Irving led the Cavaliers over the Warriors to a 137–116 win, including a record-breaking 49 points in the first quarter, a Finals-high 86 points in the first half, and a record 24 3–pointers (which broke the record of 18 set by the Warriors in Game 2). Durant and the Warriors looked to finish the series back home in Game 5. Despite early domination from James and Cleveland in Game 5, the Warriors surged ahead in the second half, fending off several late-game Cavaliers rallies, and won the title with a 129–120 victory. It was the team's second title in three years, and Durant's first championship and Finals MVP. The Warriors also broke a new playoff record with 16 wins out of 17 games played, with their only loss in Game 4 of the NBA Finals. Both the Warriors and the Cavaliers entered the Finals with a combined record of 24–1, with the Cavaliers losing only Game 3 of the Eastern Conference Finals.

In 2017–18, Golden State won the two regular-season meetings against the Cavaliers, but struggled down the stretch with multiple All-Star injuries. For the third straight MLK day, the Warriors defeated the Cavaliers 118–108. However, fueled by the return of Stephen Curry during the playoffs, the Warriors dominated the first and second rounds of the playoffs against the San Antonio Spurs and New Orleans Pelicans each in five games and advanced to their fourth consecutive Finals by overcoming a 2–3 deficit against the Houston Rockets. Cleveland also struggled during the second half of the season after overhauling their roster at the trade deadline with new, younger players. However, they still managed to beat the Indiana Pacers in seven games, sweep the Raptors, then overcome their own 2–3 deficit against the Boston Celtics to advance to the Finals. It was the first time that the same two teams in any of North America's four major professional sports leagues have met for a championship round four consecutive times.

Game 1 was close with several lead changes. James would score 51 points. However, the game went to overtime, in part due to a controversial reversed charging foul call against Durant, a missed go-ahead free throw by George Hill with 4.7 seconds left, and JR Smith subsequently rebounding and dribbling out the clock, mistakenly believing his team to be ahead. The Warriors would dominate overtime, winning the game 124–114. Several minor scuffles ensued in the closing seconds of overtime, culminating in Tristan Thompson getting ejected and later fined for shoving a basketball into the face of Draymond Green. After the game, LeBron James reportedly suffered a self-inflicted bone contusion onto his right hand after punching a whiteboard in the locker room. He played through the injury for the rest of the series, and it was not disclosed until after Game 4.

Game 2 was a more one-sided affair, with the Warriors winning 122–103. Curry would break his own NBA Finals record with nine 3 pointers in a Finals game.

Game 3 was also close, as the teams exchanged leads several times. Curry struggled from the field, shooting only 3–16 (1–10, 3 pointers), while James set a record with his 10th Finals triple-double. However, Durant would lead the Warriors to a 110–102 victory, scoring a playoff career-high 43 points, along with another clutch three.

Game 4 capped off the second time that the Cavaliers had been swept in the NBA Finals. In a 108–85 rout, Durant and Curry scored 20 and 37 points respectively, clinching the second consecutive and third title in four years for the Warriors, and sixth overall. Durant won his second NBA Finals MVP award, averaging 28.8 PPG, 10.8 RPG and 7.5 APG on 52.6% shooting, while James led both teams in scoring and assists, averaging 34 PPG and 10 APG in a losing effort.

=== Recent years ===
Following LeBron James' 2nd departure from the Cavaliers, this time to the Los Angeles Lakers, in 2018, the Cavaliers entered a rebuild centered around their 2018 first round draft pick Collin Sexton, and later their 2019 first round draft pick Darius Garland, while retaining Tristan Thompson and Kevin Love to serve as veteran leaders. The Cavaliers struggled in their next two seasons, finishing 19–63 in 2018–19 and 19–46 in the 2019–20 season prior to its suspension due to the COVID-19 pandemic. The Cavaliers were not among the 22 teams invited to complete the season. The team fired head coach Lue six games into the 2018–19 season. They hired former University of Michigan head coach John Beilein before the 2019–20 season. He resigned midway through that season. Assistant coach J.B. Bickerstaff was named interim head coach. He became the full-time head coach for the 2020–21 season. The Cavaliers nearly returned to the playoffs in the 2021–22 season, but lost to the Atlanta Hawks in the NBA play-in tournament for the 8th seed.

The Warriors returned to their 5th straight Finals in 2019, aiming for a 3-peat, but lost to the Toronto Raptors, 2–4. Kevin Durant and Andre Iguodala left the Warriors for the Brooklyn Nets and Memphis Grizzlies, respectively, in the 2019 offseason (though Iguodala would eventually become a member of the Miami Heat). These losses, combined with injuries to Klay Thompson and Stephen Curry, led the Warriors to finish an NBA-worst 15–50 in the shortened 2019–20 season and not be invited to finish the season.

In the 2022 NBA All-Star Game, Stephen Curry, Andrew Wiggins and Draymond Green were selected to represent the Warriors. When Curry was announced, he was booed by all the fans in the arena, but Curry responded by dropping 50 points and winning All-Star Game MVP. Four months later, the Warriors returned to the Finals. Iguodala returned to Golden State after spending two years with the Heat. Curry and Thompson returned after missing much of the prior two seasons due to injuries. The Warriors defeated the Boston Celtics (in a rematch of the 1964 Finals) in six games to win their 4th title in eight years and 7th overall.

The teams have played fifteen games since James' departure, with the Warriors holding a 10–5 record.

Both teams qualified for the 2023 NBA playoffs. This marked the first time since 2018 that both teams clinched playoff seeds and the first since 1998 that the Cavaliers made the playoffs without James. That postseason, the Warriors, with the help from Curry's record-setting 50-point performance in Game 7, eliminated the Sacramento Kings in seven games and would advance to the 2nd round. On the other hand, the Cavaliers were eliminated by the New York Knicks in five games. The Warriors would again face James who was now on the Lakers. In the end, James ended their quest for back to back titles in six games.

Early in the 2024–25 season, The Cavaliers (9–0) and Warriors (7–1) met for a marquee matchup in Cleveland. The Cavaliers hurried out to franchise record halftime lead of 83–42, also the eighth largest in the NBA's shot clock era, and tied its mark for points in a half. They went on to win 136–117 also becoming the first team in NBA history to win their first 10 games, while also scoring at least 110 points in each of them. The Cavaliers would go on to win their next 5 games starting 15-0, second only to the 2016 Warriors who started 24–0. Also of note is that the Cavaliers head coach Kenny Atkinson, who was an assistant coach for the Warriors the previous year (and won a title with them in 2022), became the first coach to go undefeated in his first 15 games with a new team.

LeBron James and Kevin Durant would face again in the 2026 playoffs, this time with Durant on the Houston Rockets. The Lakers eliminated the Rockets in six games of the first round.

== Season-by-season results ==
Cleveland Cavaliers vs. San Francisco/Golden State Warriors Season-by-Season Results
1970s (Warriors, 24–13)

Season	Season series		at Cleveland Cavaliers	at San Francisco/Golden State Warriors	Overall series	Notes
1970–71	Warriors	3–1	Tie, 1–1	Warriors, 2–0	Warriors, 3–1	Cleveland Cavaliers joined the NBA as an expansion team. Last season until the 2019 season the Warriors played in San Francisco.
1971–72	Warriors	4–0	Warriors, 2–0	Warriors, 2–0	Warriors, 7–1	Warriors move across the Bay to Oakland and open up Oakland–Alameda County Coliseum Arena. Warriors also change their name to "Golden State Warriors".
1972–73	Warriors	3–1	Warriors, 2–0	Tie, 1–1	Warriors, 10–2	
1973–74	Warriors	4–0	Warriors, 2–0	Warriors, 2–0	Warriors, 14–2	Final season Cavaliers played at Cleveland Arena.
1974–75	Tie	2–2	Cavaliers, 2–0	Warriors, 2–0	Warriors, 16–4	Cavaliers have the better record at home for the first time. Cavaliers open up Coliseum at Richfield. Warriors win 1975 NBA Finals.
1975–76	Warriors	3–1	Tie, 1–1	Warriors, 2–0	Warriors, 19–5	
1976–77	Tie	2–2	Cavaliers, 2–0	Warriors, 2–0	Warriors, 21–7	
1977–78	Tie	2–2	Cavaliers, 2–0	Warriors, 2–0	Warriors, 23–9	Warriors win 10 home games in a row against Cavaliers.
1978–79	Cavaliers	2–1	Tie, 1–1	Cavaliers, 1–0	Warriors, 24–11	Last season where more than three games are played in the regular season. Cavaliers win the season series for the first time.
1979–80	Cavaliers	2–0	Cavaliers; 120–93	Cavaliers; 128–125 (OT)	Warriors, 24–13	Beginning this season, the Cavaliers and Warriors face off twice per season, once at Cleveland and once at Oakland/San Francisco. Cavaliers sweep the season series for the first time.

1980s (Warriors, 11–9)

Season	Season series		at Cleveland Cavaliers	at Golden State Warriors	Overall series	Notes
1980–81	Tie	1–1	Cavaliers; 108–90	Warriors; 106–98	Warriors, 25–14	
1981–82	Tie	1–1	Cavaliers; 110–106	Warriors; 117–108	Warriors, 26–15	
1982–83	Cavaliers	2–0	Cavaliers; 99–98	Cavaliers; 132–120 (OT)	Warriors, 26–17	
1983–84	Tie	1–1	Cavaliers; 119–108	Warriors; 109–102	Warriors, 27–18	
1984–85	Tie	1–1	Warriors; 107–106	Cavaliers; 108–104	Warriors, 28–19	
1985–86	Warriors	2–0	Warriors; 110–104	Warriors; 138–128	Warriors, 30–19	
1986–87	Tie	1–1	Warriors; 112–104	Cavaliers; 115–114	Warriors, 31–20	
1987–88	Warriors	2–0	Warriors; 96–90 (OT)	Warriors; 113–112	Warriors, 33–20	
1988–89	Tie	1–1	Cavaliers; 142–109	Warriors; 120–114	Warriors, 34–21	On January 23, 1989, Cavaliers beat the Warriors 142–109, their most points scored in a game against the Warriors and their largest victory against the Warriors with a 33-point differential.
1989–90	Tie	1–1	Cavaliers; 129–104	Warriors; 145–105	Warriors, 35–22	On March 8, 1990, Warriors beat the Cavaliers 145–105, their most points scored in a game against the Cavaliers and their largest victory against the Cavaliers with a 40-point differential.

1990s (Cavaliers, 14–5)

Season	Season series		at Cleveland Cavaliers	at Golden State Warriors	Overall series	Notes
1990–91	Warriors	2–0	Warriors; 110–108	Warriors; 122–92	Warriors, 37–22	
1991–92	Tie	1–1	Cavaliers; 122–107	Warriors; 122–92	Warriors, 38–23	
1992–93	Cavaliers	2–0	Cavaliers; 100–90	Cavaliers; 126–122(2OT)	Warriors, 38–25	
1993–94	Cavaliers	2–0	Cavaliers; 107–97	Cavaliers; 102–93	Warriors, 38–27	Final season the Cavaliers played at Richfield Coliseum.
1994–95	Cavaliers	2–0	Cavaliers; 101–87	Cavaliers; 103–97 (OT)	Warriors, 38–29	Cavaliers open up Gund Arena (now known as Rocket Mortgage FieldHouse)
1995–96	Cavaliers	2–0	Cavaliers; 92–80	Cavaliers; 90–64	Warriors, 38–31	
1996–97	Tie	1–1	Cavaliers; 101–87	Warriors; 101–95 (OT)	Warriors, 39–32	Cavaliers win 10 games in a row against the Warriors.
1997–98	Cavaliers	2–0	Cavaliers; 102–82	Cavaliers; 95–67	Warriors, 39–34	
1998–99	Cavaliers	1–0	Cavaliers; 97–80	N/A	Warriors, 39–35	Due to a lockout, only one game was played this season.
1999–2000	Tie	1–1	Cavaliers; 90–75	Warriors; 115–103	Warriors, 40–36	

2000s (Cavaliers, 13–7)

Season	Season series		at Cleveland Cavaliers	at Golden State Warriors	Overall series	Notes
2000–01	Cavaliers	2–0	Cavaliers; 96–86	Cavaliers; 107–101	Warriors, 40–38	
2001–02	Tie	1–1	Cavaliers; 113–98	Warriors; 117–88	Warriors, 41–39	
2002–03	Tie	1–1	Cavaliers; 124–103	Warriors; 108–80	Warriors, 42–40	Cavaliers win 12 home games in a row against the Warriors.
2003–04	Warriors	2–0	Warriors; 103–100	Warriors; 119–102	Warriors, 44–40	LeBron James makes his debut for the Cavaliers. Warriors sweep the season series and win in Cleveland for the first time since the 1990 season.
2004–05	Cavaliers	2–0	Cavaliers; 99–88	Cavaliers; 105–87	Warriors, 44–42	
2005–06	Warriors	2–0	Warriors; 99–91	Warriors; 99–79	Warriors, 46–42	
2006–07	Cavaliers	2–0	Cavaliers; 124–97	Cavaliers; 106–104 (OT)	Warriors, 46–44	Cavaliers lose 2007 NBA Finals.
2007–08	Tie	1–1	Warriors; 105–96	Cavaliers; 108–104	Warriors, 47–45	
2008–09	Cavaliers	2–0	Cavaliers; 112–97	Cavaliers; 106–105	Tie, 47–47	Cavaliers finish with the best record in the league (66–16).
2009–10	Cavaliers	2–0	Cavaliers; 114–108	Cavaliers; 117–114	Cavaliers, 49–47	Cavaliers take the overall record for the first and only time this season. Cavaliers finish with the best record in the league (61–21). Steph Curry makes his debut for the Warriors.

2010s (Warriors, 30–10)

Season	Season series		at Cleveland Cavaliers	at Golden State Warriors	Overall series	Notes
2010–11	Warriors	2–0	Warriors; 95–85	Warriors; 116–98	Tie, 49–49	LeBron James leaves the Cavaliers to join the Miami Heat.
2011–12	Warriors	1–0	Warriors; 105–95	N/A	Warriors, 50–49	Due to a lockout, only one game was played this season.
2012–13	Warriors	2–0	Warriors; 108–95	Warriors; 106–96	Warriors, 52–49	
2013–14	Tie	1–1	Warriors; 108–104 (OT)	Cavaliers; 103–94	Warriors, 53–50	
2014–15	Tie	1–1	Cavaliers; 110–99	Warriors; 112–94	Warriors, 54–51	LeBron James rejoins the Cavaliers. Warriors finish with the best record in the league (67–15).
2015 NBA Finals	Warriors	4–2	Warriors, 2–1	Warriors, 2–1	Warriors, 58–53	1st NBA Finals series. Warriors win their first NBA Championship since the 1975 season.
2015–16	Warriors	2–0	Warriors; 132–98	Warriors; 89–83	Warriors, 60–53	The game at Golden State was played on Christmas. Warriors finish with the best record in the league and set an NBA record for most wins in the regular season (73–9).
2016 NBA Finals	Cavaliers	4–3	Cavaliers, 2–1	Tie, 2–2	Warriors, 63–57	2nd NBA Finals series. Cavaliers win their first NBA Championship in franchise history and ended a 52-year championship drought for Cleveland teams. The Cavaliers became the first team in NBA history to overcome a 3–1 deficit in the Finals, the fourth team to win the series after dropping the first two games, and the first team since the 1977 Washington Bullets to clinch a game 7 victory on the road in the finals.
2016–17	Tie	1–1	Cavaliers; 109–108	Warriors; 126–91	Warriors, 64–58	The game at Cleveland was played on Christmas. Warriors finish with the best record in the league (67–15).
2017 NBA Finals	Warriors	4–1	Tie, 1–1	Warriors, 3–0	Warriors, 68–59	3rd NBA Finals series. First time in NBA history the same two teams had met for a third consecutive year in the NBA Finals. Cavaliers handed the Warriors their only loss in the 2017 NBA playoffs. The Warriors' 15–0 start in the playoffs is the most consecutive postseason wins in NBA history and their 16–1 record is the best winning percentage (.941) in NBA playoff history.
2017–18	Warriors	2–0	Warriors; 118–108	Warriors; 99–92	Warriors, 70–59	The game at Golden State was played on Christmas.
2018 NBA Finals	Warriors	4–0	Warriors, 2–0	Warriors, 2–0	Warriors, 74–59	4th NBA Finals series. First time in any of North America's four major professional sports leagues that the same two teams have faced each other in the championship for four consecutive years. The Warriors became the 7th NBA franchise to win back-to-back championships. This was the first NBA Finals sweep since the 2007 Finals, which also involved the Cavaliers. Last series LeBron James played for the Cavaliers.
2018–19	Warriors	2–0	Warriors; 129–105	Warriors; 120–114	Warriors, 76–59	In the offseason, LeBron James leaves the Cavaliers again and signs with the Los Angeles Lakers. Last season where the Warriors played in Oakland. Warriors lose 2019 NBA Finals.
2019–20	Warriors	1–0	Warriors; 131–112	N/A	Warriors, 77–59	Warriors return to San Francisco and open up Chase Center. Due to the COVID-19 pandemic suspending the season, the game scheduled in San Francisco was canceled. Cavaliers and Warriors finish last in Eastern and Western Conferences respectively.

2020s (Warriors, 8–6)

Season	Season series		at Cleveland Cavaliers	at Golden State Warriors	Overall series	Notes
2020–21	Warriors	2–0	Warriors; 119–101	Warriors; 129–98	Warriors, 79–59	
2021–22	Warriors	2–0	Warriors; 104–89	Warriors; 96–82	Warriors, 81–59	Warriors win 2022 NBA Finals.
2022–23	Warriors	2–0	Warriors; 120–114	Warriors; 106–101	Warriors, 83–59	Warriors win 16 games in a row against the Cavaliers.
2023–24	Cavaliers	2–0	Cavaliers; 115–104	Cavaliers; 118–110	Warriors, 83–61	Cavaliers sweep the season series for the first time since the 2009 season.
2024–25	Cavaliers	2–0	Cavaliers; 136–117	Cavaliers; 113–95	Warriors, 83–63	
2025–26	Tie	1–1	Warriors; 99–94	Cavaliers; 118–111	Warriors, 84–64	
2026–27	Tie	0-0	December 12th, 2026	March 16th, 2027	Warriors, 84–64	LeBron James joins the Philadelphia 76ers.

Summary of Results

Season	Season series		at Cleveland Cavaliers	at San Francisco/Golden State Warriors	Notes
Regular season games	Warriors	69–57	Cavaliers, 36–29	Warriors, 40–21	
Postseason games	Warriors	15–7	Warriors, 6–4	Warriors, 9–3	
Postseason series	Warriors	3–1	Warriors, 2–0	Tie, 1–1	NBA Finals: 2015, 2016, 2017, 2018
Regular and postseason	Warriors	84–64	Cavaliers, 40–35	Warriors, 49–24	

== Individual Statistics (NBA Finals) ==
Bold denotes statistical leader

Rank	Player	Team	GP	MPG	FG%	3P%	FT%	RPG	APG	SPG	BPG	PPG
1	LeBron James	CLE	**22**	**43.5**	48.1	34.9	71.9	**11.5**	**9.3**	1.7	1.3	**33.0**
2	Kevin Durant	GS	9	40.5	**54.3**	**45.0**	**94.1**	9.3	6.3	0.9	**1.9**	32.7
3	Kyrie Irving	CLE	13	39.8	46.8	39.5	92.6	4.2	4.2	**1.8**	0.6	27.7
4	Stephen Curry	GS	**22**	38.7	42.2	39.7	91.6	5.1	6.3	1.5	0.4	25.4
5	Klay Thompson	GS	**22**	36.6	43.1	36.9	80.8	3.9	1.7	0.6	0.5	17.2
6	Kevin Love	CLE	15	30.1	38.8	33.3	81.1	9.5	1.3	1.3	0.5	13.8
7	Draymond Green	GS	21	38.3	42.4	31.1	74.0	8.9	6.0	1.9	1.0	12.8
8	Andre Iguodala	GS	20	32.4	50.9	36.7	37.8	5.0	3.6	1.2	0.7	11.2
9	J. R. Smith	CLE	**22**	33.6	37.7	38.2	59.3	3.0	1.1	1.2	0.4	10.9
10	Harrison Barnes	GS	13	32.3	36.1	35.4	68.4	5.1	1.2	0.8	0.5	9.1

Note: Shaun Livingston and Tristan Thompson also played in all 22 Finals games. Livingston owns the highest field goal percentage.

== See also ==
- List of National Basketball Association rivalries
- Death Lineup
- Celtics–Lakers rivalry – the most popular rivalry in NBA history, with both teams having played each other in the NBA Finals twelve times in five different decades
