= Death Lineup =

Group of Golden State Warriors basketball players from 2015 to 2019

Death Lineup

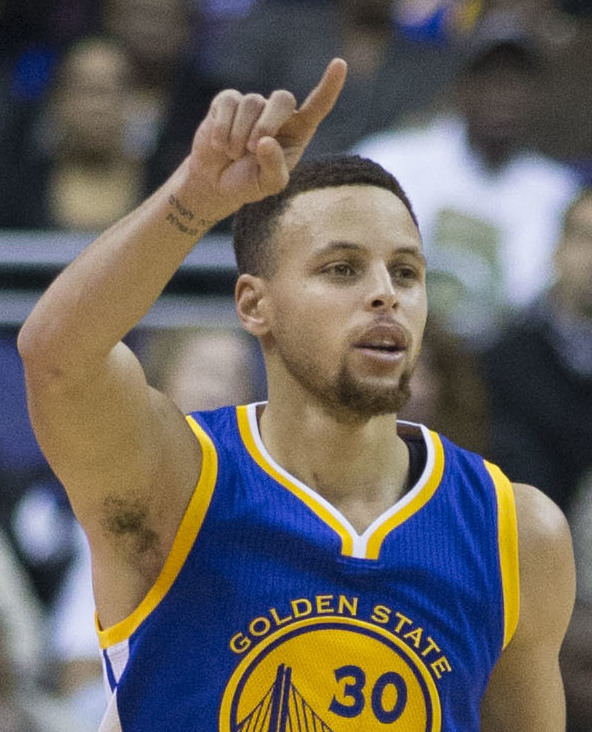
Stephen Curry

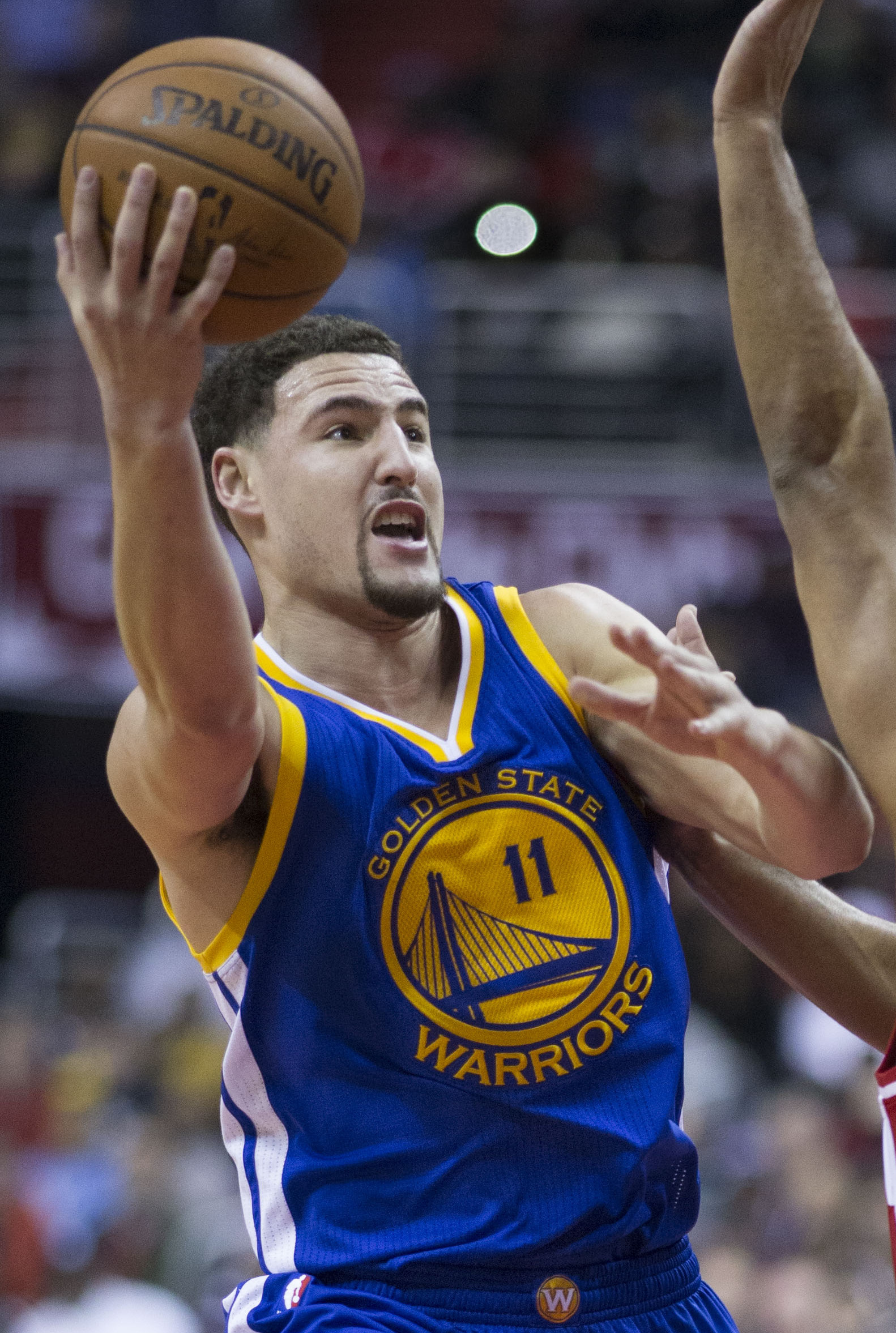
Klay Thompson

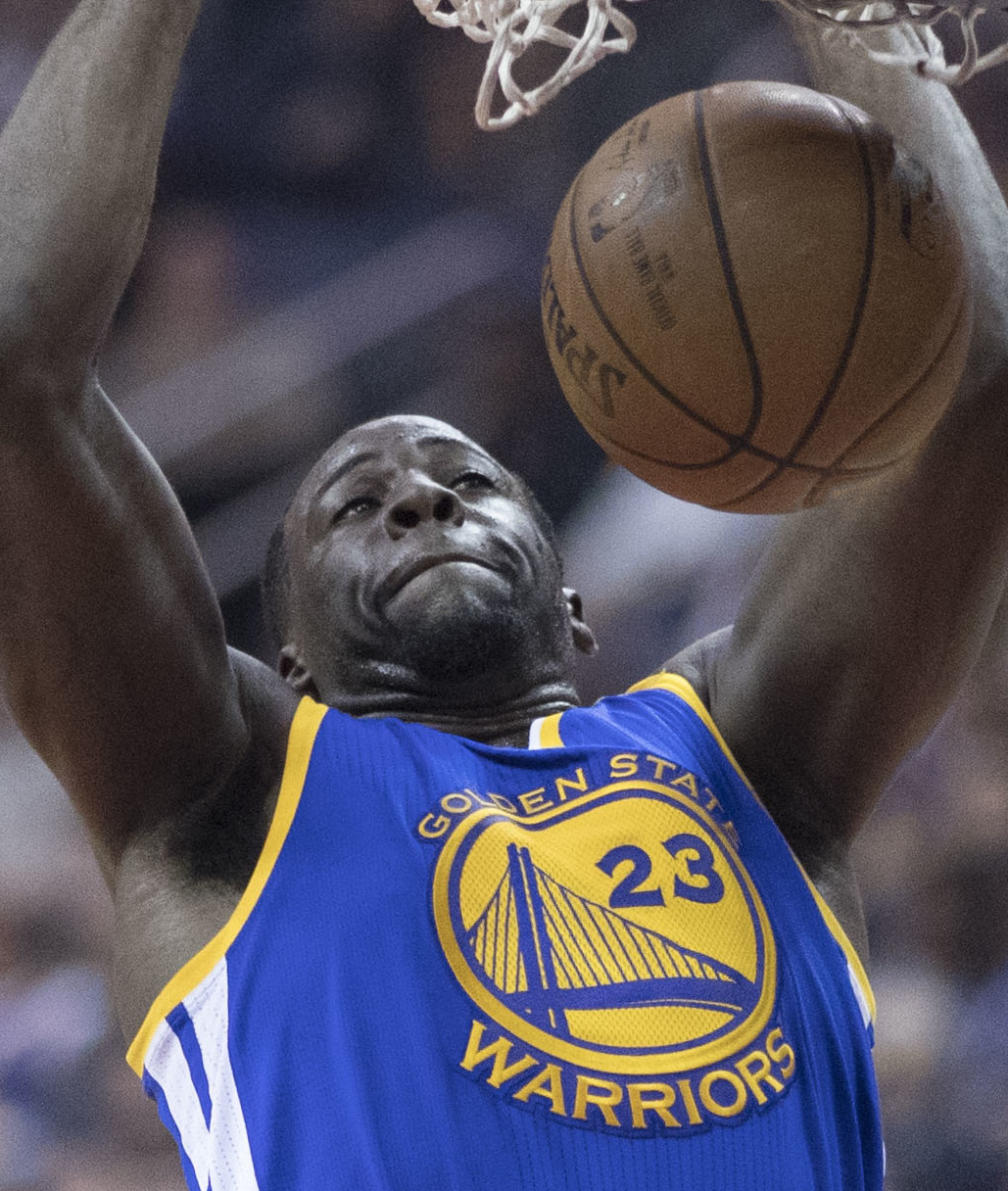
Draymond Green

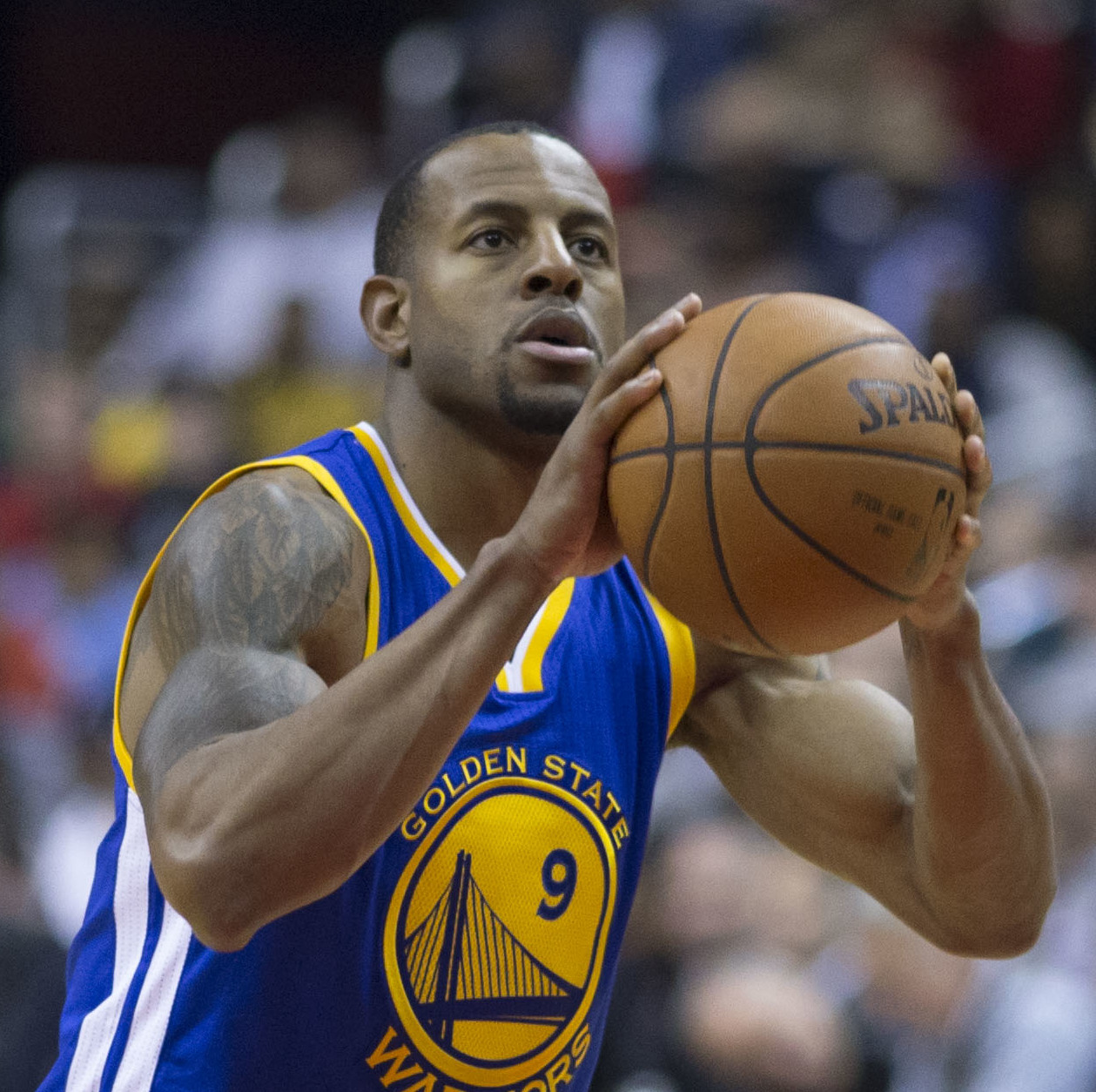
Andre Iguodala

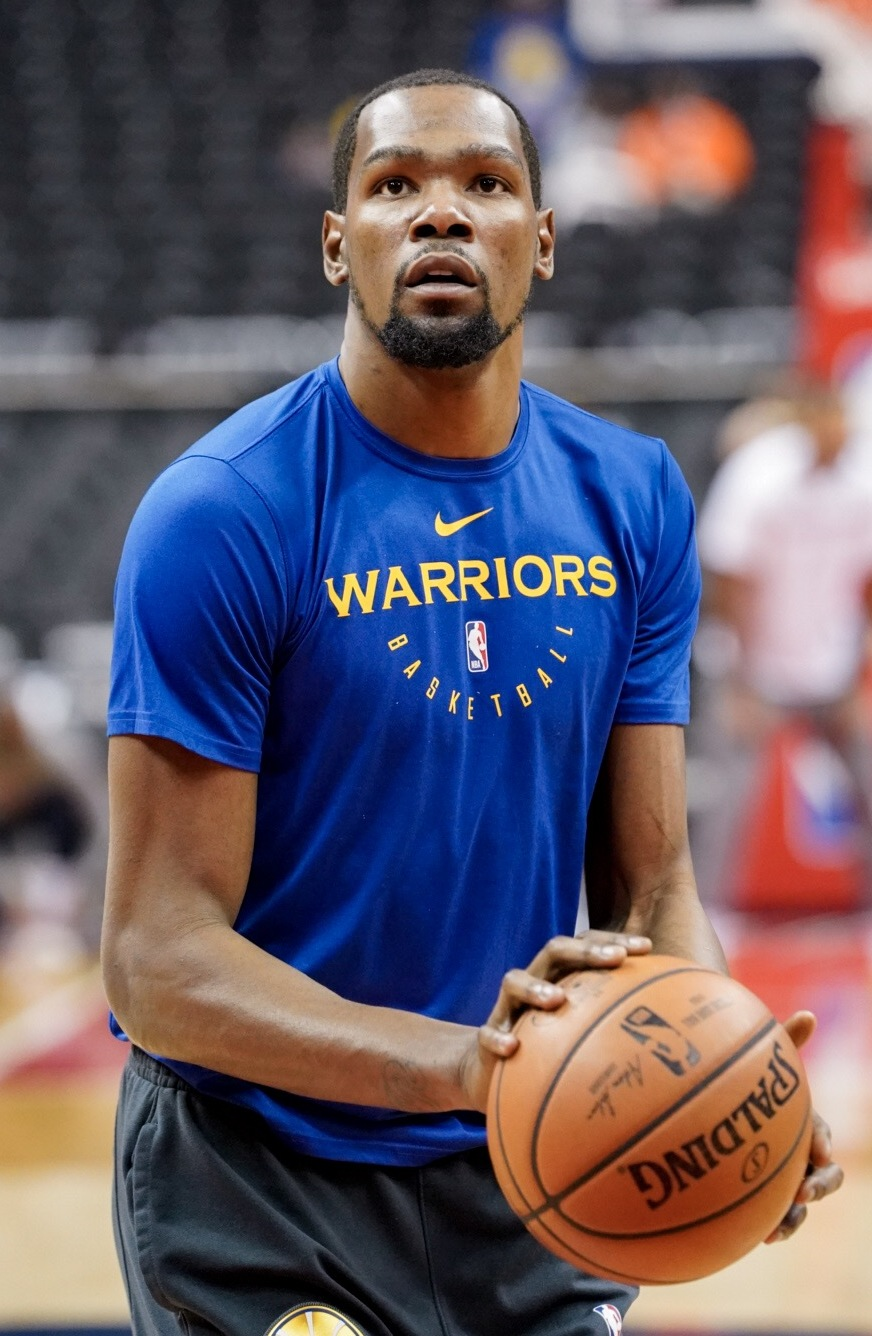
Kevin Durant

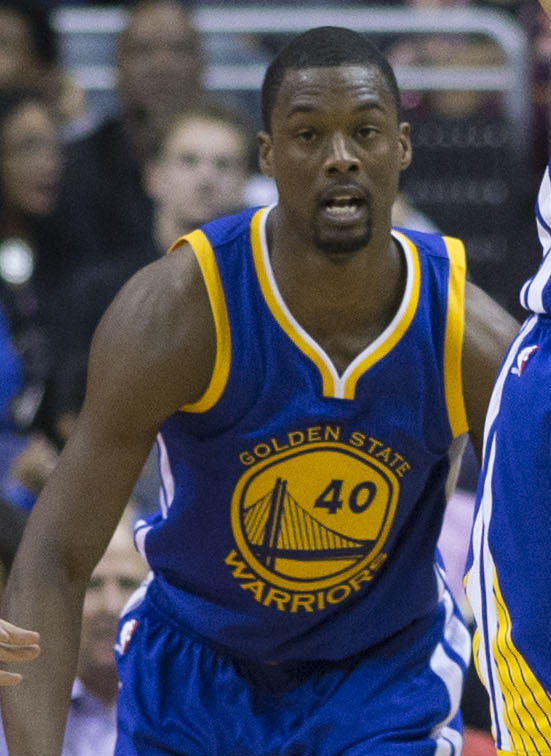
Harrison Barnes

The Death Lineup was a lineup of basketball players on the Golden State Warriors of the National Basketball Association (NBA) from 2014 to 2019. Developed under head coach Steve Kerr, it began during their 2014–15 run that led to the Warriors’ first NBA championship since 1975. Unlike typical small-ball units, this group of Warriors was versatile enough to defend larger opponents, while also aiming to create mismatches on offense with their shooting and playmaking skills.

The lineup featured the Splash Brothers, a three-point shooting backcourt consisting of two-time NBA MVP Stephen Curry, and perennial two-way All-Star Klay Thompson. It also featured versatile defender and 2015 NBA Finals MVP Andre Iguodala on the wing, alongside 2014 NBA MVP scorer Kevin Durant, and 2016–17 Defensive Player of the Year Draymond Green at center. Green's defensive versatility was described as the "key" that allowed the lineup to be so effective; although his natural position was power forward, he was able to play as an undersized center in lieu of a traditional center who might have been slower or lacked the playmaking and shooting abilities of Green. The lineup originally included Harrison Barnes, who was replaced in 2016–17 by former league MVP and four-time scoring champion Durant; the new group began to be known as the "Hamptons Five".

The Death Lineup was considered to be indicative of a larger overall trend in the NBA towards "positionless" basketball, where traditional position assignments and roles have less importance. Their time together ended after the 2018–19 season, when Durant became a free agent and decided not to rejoin the Warriors and Iguodala was traded.

== Origins and first championship ==
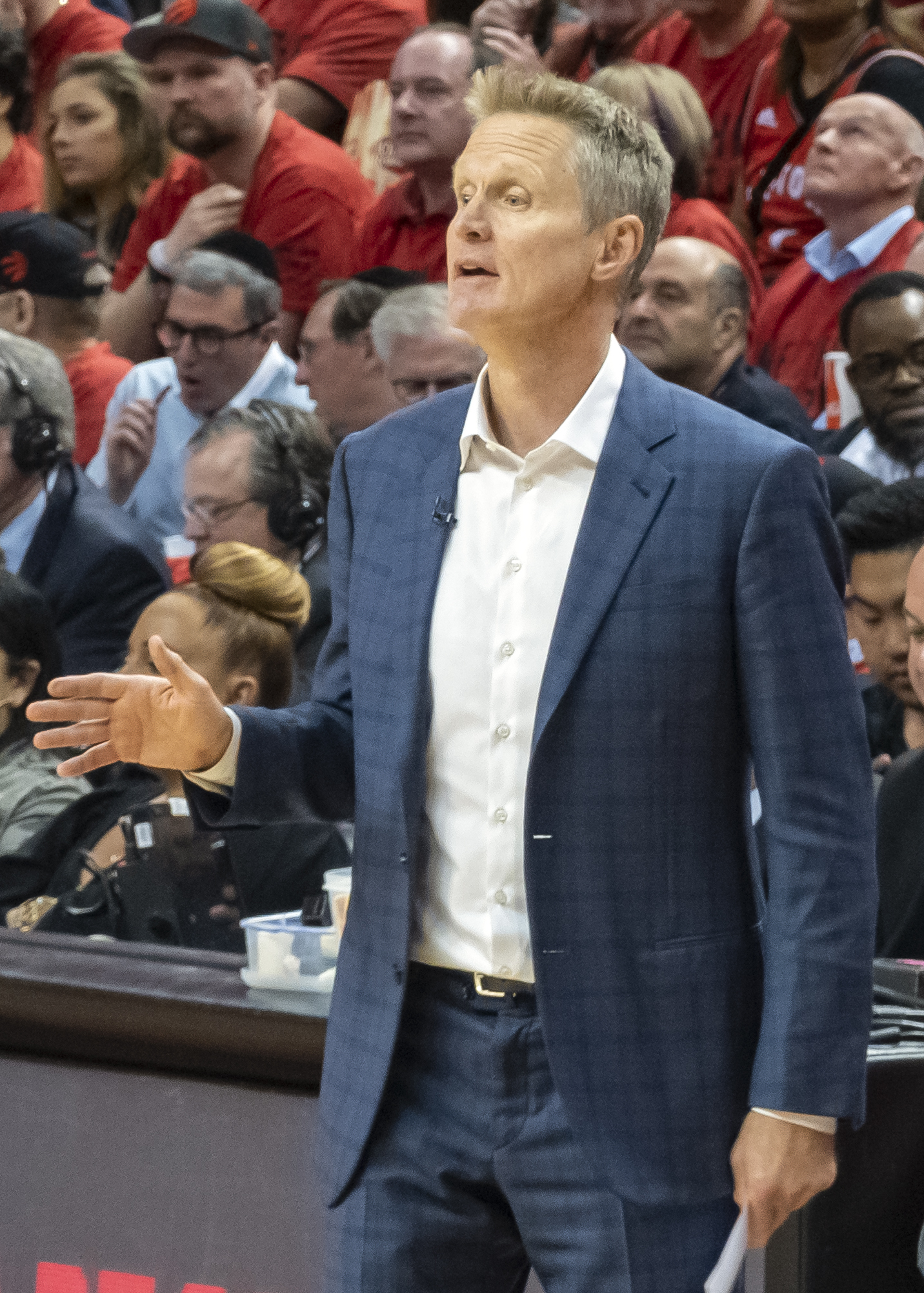
Golden State Warriors head coach Steve Kerr in 2019

In 2014–15, Golden State won 67 games in the regular season, led by NBA MVP Stephen Curry. The Warriors' starting lineup with the 7-foot (2.1 m) Andrew Bogut at center played 813 minutes together and outscored opponents by 19.6 points per 100 possessions. After falling behind 2–1 in the 2015 NBA Finals, Warriors coach Steve Kerr inserted Andre Iguodala into the starting lineup in place of Bogut, who had been named to NBA All-Defensive Team in 2015. Draymond Green moved from power forward to center, while Iguodala and Harrison Barnes, both traditional small forwards, were the forwards. The adjustment surrendered size and strength for speed and playmaking. The change was first suggested by Kerr's special assistant, Nick U'Ren, who was a fan of the lineup because it always seemed to pick up the pace of the game to a faster speed, which the Warriors preferred. He had also been watching video of the 2014 NBA Finals, when the series turned after San Antonio Spurs coach Gregg Popovich increased the tempo by switching to a small-ball lineup with the 6-foot-8-inch (2.03 m) Boris Diaw at center. The Spurs defeated the Miami Heat and LeBron James, who was now back with Cleveland facing Golden State. U'Ren anticipated that Iguodala would have the same impact for the Warriors.

The five-man lineup of Iguodala, Curry, Thompson, Green, and Barnes had played together for 102 minutes during the regular season and 62 minutes through the first 18 games of the playoffs. Although the tallest player was only 6 feet 8 inches (2.03 m), the unit was also strong defensively. They were all able to switch on defense, spearheaded by Green's ability to guard players taller and heavier than him. The Warriors won 103–82 in Game 4, and captured the series 4–2 to win their first championship since 1975. In the last three games, they defeated the Cavaliers by a combined 42 points, and the new starting unit outscored Cleveland 107–87 in their 49 minutes together. Iguodala was named the Finals MVP, becoming the first player to garner the award without starting every game in the series, as well as the first winner to have not started a game during the regular season.

== 73-win record ==
It was not until months after it was deployed in the Finals that the Warriors small lineup was referred to as the Death Lineup, a phrase originated by Vincent Goodwill, then of The Detroit News. Despite the unit's success, the 2015–16 Warriors continued to start a traditional lineup with Bogut as their center. Golden State won an NBA-record 73 games behind Curry's league-leading 30.1 points per game and an NBA-record 402 three-pointers made in a season. He was named the MVP for the second straight season, becoming the first unanimous winner in league history. During the season, the Death Lineup was generally reserved to finish the first half and the end of games. It was deployed in 37 games, outscoring opponents by 166 points in 172 minutes for an average advantage of 4.5 points per game and 47.0 points per 100 possessions. Despite their regular season success, the Warriors lost the 2016 NBA Finals, becoming the first team to lose a Finals series after being ahead 3–1.

== Hamptons Five ==
During the off-season, Golden State signed former league MVP and four-time scoring champion Kevin Durant to replace Harrison Barnes, who had averaged just five points and made only 5 of 32 shots during the last three losses in the 2016 Finals. With Durant leaving the Oklahoma City Thunder, the Warriors' opponents in the 2016 Western Conference Finals, the move was seen as a disruption in the competitive balance of the NBA, and the Warriors instantly became strong title favorites. The move gave the Death Lineup four players who have averaged at least five assists in a season. While Barnes was a good defender, Durant also added a shot-blocking element to their switching defense. San Francisco Bay Area journalist Tim Kawakami coined the nickname "Hamptons Five" for the new group, which included the four players who traveled with team officials to The Hamptons to recruit Durant. Durant was impressed that all four players showed up and respected his play. They convinced Durant that he was wanted even though they had already won a championship and came within a game of winning a second. Curry, asked by Durant why he wanted him to join, assured him that he was focused on winning and not concerned with being the face of the franchise, despite being the two-time defending league MVP. The Warriors won the 2017 NBA Finals 4–1, and Durant was unanimously voted the Finals MVP. Kerr had used the Death Lineup for just 16 minutes in the series until deploying it for 17 in the Game 5 clincher. Iguodala scored 20 points in 38 minutes after averaging less than 30 minutes in the first four games of the series. Kerr used him in the small-ball lineup in lieu of big men Zaza Pachulia (10 minutes) and JaVale McGee (0).

Injuries limited Golden State's use of the Death Lineup in 2017–18. Opponents had also adapted by rarely leaving their centers in the game against the Warriors' small lineup. Through 49 games, the unit had a -1.2 plus-minus rating. However, it was still considered the team's most potent lineup. In the final 17 games of the regular season, the Warriors were 7–10 with Curry missing all but one game after an ankle and later a knee injury. Durant, Thompson, Green, and Iguodala each missed four to eight games as well. In total, the group finished the regular season with 127 minutes played together over 28 games, outscoring their opponents by a mundane 22 points. In Game 4 of the conference semifinals in the 2018 playoffs, Kerr started the Hamptons Five with Durant for the first time ever, and they posted a plus-minus of +26 in 18 minutes to lead a 118–92 win over the New Orleans Pelicans, giving Golden State a 3–1 lead in the series. After eliminating the Pelicans in five games, the Warriors continued with the starting lineup in the conference finals to build a 2–1 series lead against the Houston Rockets. Golden State won the series 4–3, but Iguodala missed the last four games with a bruised leg. The Warriors entered the NBA Finals for the fourth straight time versus Cleveland. They swept the Cavaliers in the series in four games, leading to their third championship in four years.

== Fifth consecutive Finals ==
In 2018–19, the Warriors acquired DeMarcus Cousins, who was recovering from a ruptured left Achilles. He gave Golden State a top-flight, true center for the first time under Kerr, and they became the first team in 42 years with a starting lineup of five All-Stars from the previous season. While the Hamptons Five played more (178 minutes in 38 games) than in the previous regular season, Kerr played the lineup of Cousins, Durant, Curry, Thompson and Green more (268 minutes in 21 games) to integrate Cousins into his new team. In Game 1 of the opening round of the 2019 playoffs, Kerr went to the Hamptons Five early, using them to quell a rally by the Los Angeles Clippers. The coach called the lineup "the best five-man unit in the league". Cousins finished the game with a -17 plus-minus. The Warriors eliminated the Clippers in six games, but Cousins tore his left quadriceps in Game 2, and he was initially thought to be out for the remainder of the postseason. In a sign of respect and with an increased urgency, Kerr opened the following round against Houston by starting the Hamptons Five for the first time in the season. The Rockets featured two of the top one-on-one, pick-and-roll players in James Harden and Chris Paul, and the coach wanted Iguodala's defense in the starting lineup to counter. In Game 2, each member of the lineup scored at least 15 points, the first time for a Warriors starting unit under Kerr, and Golden State jumped to a 2–0 series lead. Houston countered the Warriors' small unit by playing forward P. J. Tucker at center along with four guards, forming a lineup of five shooters all 6 feet 6 inches (1.98 m) or shorter, and tied the series 2–2. In Game 5, Durant suffered a strained right calf and left with 2:05 remaining in the third quarter; he was later ruled out indefinitely. With Curry and Thompson struggling with their shooting, Durant had been their best player in the playoffs, averaging a team-leading 35.4 points entering the game. However, Curry led Golden State to a Game 5 win after scoring 16 of his 25 points after Durant exited. The Warriors captured the series on the road in Game 6, when Thompson scored 21 of his 27 in the first half, and Curry collected all of his 33 points in the second half.

In the Western Conference finals, Golden State swept the Portland Trail Blazers 4–0, with three of the wins including comebacks of 15 points or more. After starting nine consecutive games, Iguodala missed the deciding Game 4 with a sore left calf injury from Game 3. Curry averaged a series career-high 36.5 points, the highest average by a player in a four-game sweep in NBA history. He and Green both had triple-doubles in Game 4, becoming the first teammates in NBA playoff history to achieve the feat in the same game. The Warriors became only the second team to reach five straight NBA Finals, joining the Boston Celtics (1957–1966). (Note: The Celtics advanced 10 straight times, winning nine, including eight consecutive.) Golden State was down 3–1 in the 2019 finals to the Toronto Raptors when Durant returned in Game 5. The Hamptons Five started the game, but Durant ruptured his right Achilles tendon in the second quarter. The Warriors lost the series in Game 6, when Thompson tore the anterior cruciate ligament (ACL) in his left knee. Both Durant and Thompson were expected to miss most, if not all, of the following season.

== Aftermath ==
After the 2018–19 season, the free agent Durant announced that he would sign with the Brooklyn Nets, while Thompson agreed to re-sign with Golden State. Eyeing a replacement for Thompson while he recovered from his injury, the Warriors traded Iguodala to the Memphis Grizzlies in order to free salary cap space to acquire All-Star guard D'Angelo Russell in a sign-and-trade package with Brooklyn for Durant. After Durant's and Iguodala's departures, Warriors CEO Joe Lacob announced his intention to eventually retire their numbers.

In 2019–20, the Warriors moved into their new arena, Chase Center, which includes a hallway featuring drawings of each member of the Hamptons Five. Golden State finished with a league-worst 15–50 record. Thompson missed the entire season rehabbing his injury, and Curry was limited to five games all season after breaking his left hand in October. The Warriors' season ended prematurely due to the COVID-19 pandemic.

== See also ==
- Cavaliers–Warriors rivalry
