= Andre Iguodala =

American basketball player (born 1984)

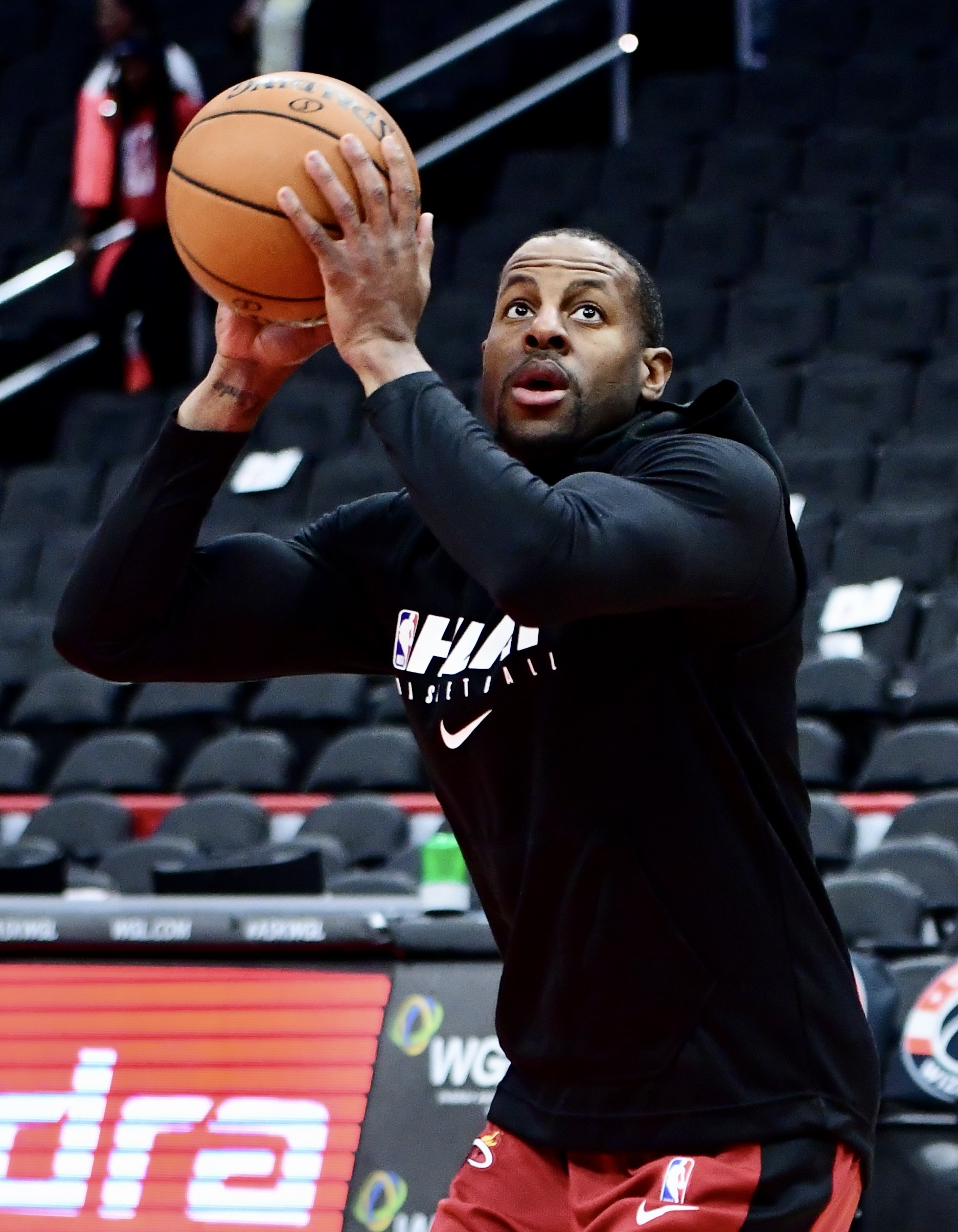
- Iguodala with the Miami Heat in 2020

Personal information
- Born: January 28, 1984 (age 42) Springfield, Illinois, U.S.
- Listed height: 6 ft 6 in (1.98 m)
- Listed weight: 215 lb (98 kg)

Career information
- High school: Lanphier (Springfield, Illinois)
- College: Arizona (2002–2004)
- NBA draft: 2004: 1st round, 9th overall pick
- Drafted by: Philadelphia 76ers
- Playing career: 2004–2023
- Position: Small forward / shooting guard
- Number: 4, 9, 28

Career history
- 2004–2012: Philadelphia 76ers
- 2012–2013: Denver Nuggets
- 2013–2019: Golden State Warriors
- 2020–2021: Miami Heat
- 2021–2023: Golden State Warriors

Career highlights
- 4× NBA champion (2015, 2017, 2018, 2022); NBA Finals MVP (2015); NBA All-Star (2012); NBA All-Defensive First Team (2014); NBA All-Defensive Second Team (2011); NBA All-Rookie First Team (2005); No. 9 retired by Golden State Warriors; First-team All-Pac-10 (2004); Pac-10 All-Freshman Team (2003); Second-team Parade All-American (2002)

Career statistics
- Points: 13,968 (11.3 ppg)
- Rebounds: 6,047 (4.9 rpg)
- Assists: 5,147 (4.2 apg)
- Stats at NBA.com
- Stats at Basketball Reference
Medals
Men's basketball
Representing the United States
Olympic Games
Gold medal – first place	2012 London	Team
FIBA World Championship
Gold medal – first place	2010 Turkey	Team

Andre Tyler Iguodala (/ɪɡwəˈdɑːlə/ ig-wə-DAH-lə; born January 28, 1984) is an American former professional basketball player who played for 19 seasons in the National Basketball Association (NBA). A swingman, he was an NBA All-Star in 2012 and was named to the NBA All-Defensive Team twice. Iguodala won four NBA championships with the Golden State Warriors and was named the NBA Finals Most Valuable Player (FMVP) in 2015. He was also a member of the U.S. national team at the 2010 FIBA World Championship and 2012 Summer Olympics, winning the gold medal both times.

Iguodala played college basketball with the Arizona Wildcats. After earning first-team all-conference honors in the Pac-10 (known now as the Pac-12) as a sophomore in 2004, he was selected in the 2004 NBA draft with the ninth overall pick by the Philadelphia 76ers. Iguodala played for Philadelphia until the summer of 2012 when he joined the Denver Nuggets in a four-team trade. He was acquired by Golden State in 2013. In 2014–15, Iguodala became a reserve for the first time in his career, but played a major role. He captured the Finals MVP after returning to the starting lineup in the middle of the championship series. After three championships and five trips to the Finals with the Warriors, Iguodala had a two-year stint with the Miami Heat, with whom he reached his sixth straight Finals in 2020. Iguodala returned to Golden State in 2021 and won his fourth NBA championship that season. He spent another season with the Warriors before retiring from playing in 2023.

From 2019 to 2023, Iguodala served as vice-president of the National Basketball Players Association (NBPA). From 2023 to 2026, he was the NBPA's executive director.

== Early life ==
Iguodala was born in Springfield, Illinois, the son of Linda Shanklin. His older brother, Frank, played for Lake Land College in Mattoon, Illinois, and Dayton. His mother is African American and his father is Nigerian. Growing up, Iguodala was a Chicago Bulls fan, and cites Michael Jordan as the player he looked up to the most.

Iguodala attended Lanphier High School in Springfield, Illinois, which had produced such notable athletes as baseball Hall of Famer Robin Roberts and NBA guard Kevin Gamble. Iguodala did well there both academically and athletically, winning All-Conference academic honors, making the National Honor Roll, being named State Journal-Register Student-Athlete of the Week several times, and earning three letters in track for the high jump. As a senior in 2002, Iguodala led Lanphier's basketball team to a runner-up finish at the Illinois High School Association Class AA state tournament. That season, he averaged 23.5 points, 7.8 rebounds and 4.1 assists per game. Iguodala was named Chicago Sun-Times Player of the Year as well as a second-team Parade All-American and Nike All-American. He was also a finalist for the Illinois Mr. Basketball award, which was won by Dee Brown. Iguodala's Lanphier jersey is now retired.

During the summer of 2000, Iguodala captured the attention of coaches around the nation by hitting a game-winning buzzer-beater to give his team the 17-and-under AAU national title and being named the tournament MVP. In 2002, Iguodala played in the Jordan Brand Classic in Washington, D.C. In 22 minutes of play, he put up six points on 3–6 shooting, five rebounds, two assists, three steals, and a block. Iguodala played AAU basketball under Larry Butler and the Illinois Warriors, the team that has featured other professional players such as Dwyane Wade and Quentin Richardson, and Duke head coach Jon Scheyer.

Considered a four-star recruit by Scout.com, Iguodala was listed as the No. 6 small forward and the No. 26 player in the nation in 2002.

== College career ==
Iguodala initially signed a National Letter of Intent to play at Arkansas. He had narrowed down his list of desired schools to two: Kansas or Arkansas. Iguodala was enticed by Arkansas's 1–3 system, which would have allowed Iguodala to run the point occasionally. Iguodala visited the Arkansas campus and was impressed by their large gymnasium and the number of fans at a practice while there with his mother and father. After their coach, Nolan Richardson, was fired that year (2002), Iguodala decided to attend Arizona instead. At Arizona, he joined future NBA players Channing Frye, Luke Walton, Mustafa Shakur, Salim Stoudamire and Hassan Adams. One of the determining factors for Iguodala was the commitment of Hassan Adams, whom Iguodala had played with in the Jordan Brand Classic in high school. Many colleges regarded Iguodala as a track star turned basketball player, but teammate Luke Walton said, "He is going to be one of the best players to ever come out of Arizona by the time he is done here." Iguodala was named to the Pac-10 All-Freshmen team for 2002–03. In his freshman year, Iguodala quickly established himself as one of the best all-around players on the team, ranking in the top 5 for his team in just about every major category.

As a sophomore in 2003–04, Iguodala was named team MVP after leading his team in rebounds, assists and steals. He also made the All-Pac-10 First Team and was named Honorable Mention All-America by The Associated Press. Iguodala collected three triple-doubles that season, joining Jason Kidd as the only two players in Pac-10 history to post two or more triple-doubles in a season. During his career at Arizona, the Wildcats made it to the NCAA Tournament both seasons. In his freshman year, the Wildcats were defeated in the Elite Eight by Kansas. In his sophomore year, Arizona was defeated in the first round by Seton Hall. After posting career totals of 594 points (9.6 ppg), 409 rebounds (6.6 rpg) and 95 steals (1.53 spg) in 62 games (34 starts), Iguodala left to enter the NBA draft. At Arizona, Iguodala planned to major in education. After the season, he signed with agent Rob Pelinka, co-founder of the Landmark Sports Agency, who had represented NBA All-Stars such as Kobe Bryant, Carlos Boozer, and Gerald Wallace.

== Professional career ==
=== Philadelphia 76ers (2004–2012) ===
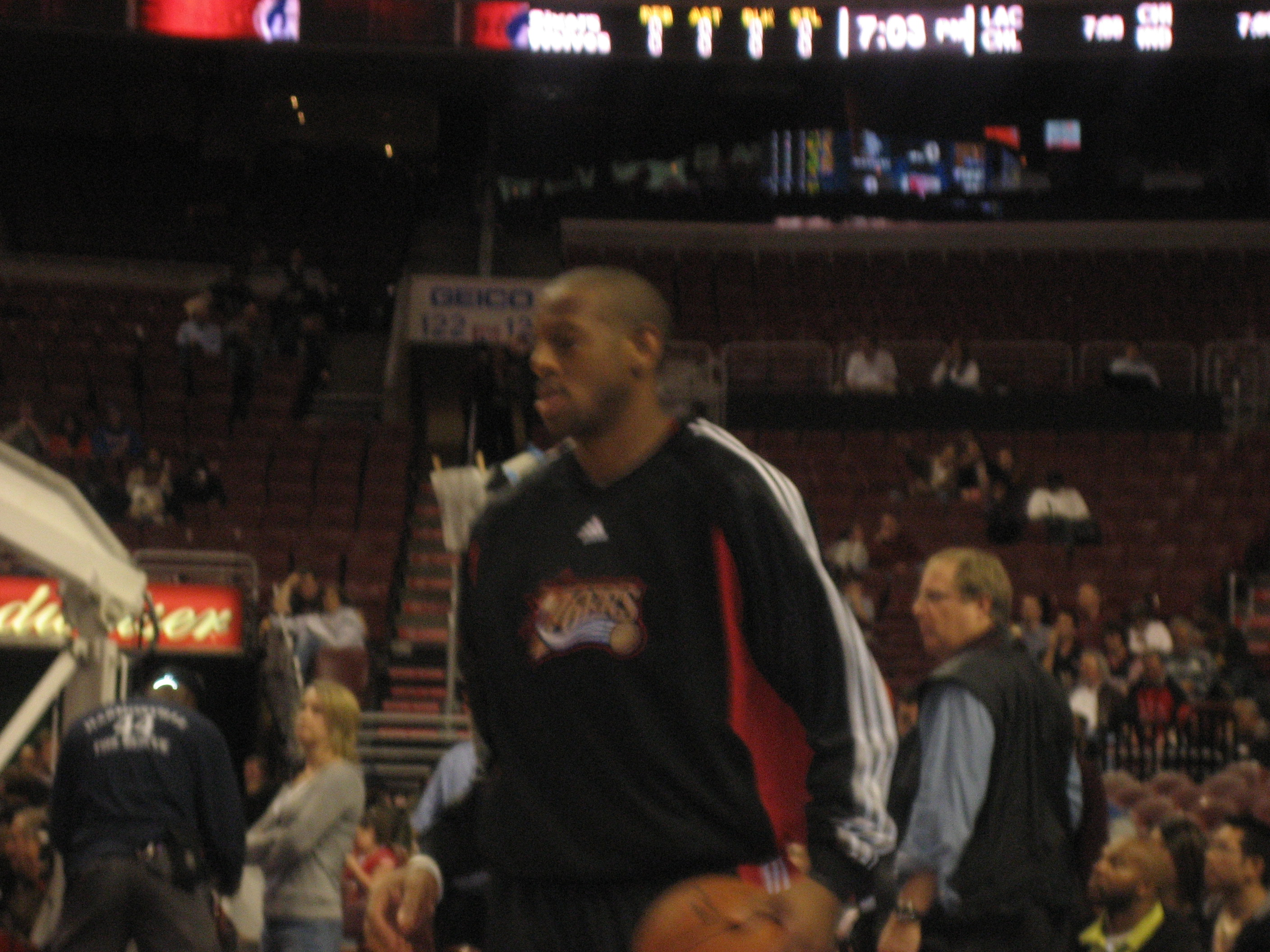
Iguodala warming up prior to a game for the 76ers

==== 2004–05 season: Rookie season ====
Iguodala was selected 9th overall in the 2004 NBA draft by the Philadelphia 76ers. When Iguodala was selected, ESPN personality Dick Vitale commented that it was a mistake for the Sixers to take him, saying: "Iguodala was a [27 percent] shooter from the college three-point line. He's not going to be able to play." Iguodala used this as motivation in what proved to be a very productive rookie season. He was thrust into the starting lineup immediately and was the only 76er to play and start all 82 regular-season games plus five playoff games, becoming a favorite target of Allen Iverson in the process, often connecting on highlight-reel dunks on passes or alley-oops from Iverson. Iguodala proved his versatility, as Iguodala was the only rookie and 76er to record a triple-double that season, doing it against the defending champion Detroit Pistons. In that game, he scored 10 points, caught 10 rebounds and dished out 10 assists. During the season, Iguodala averaged 9.0 points, 5.7 rebounds, 3 assists, 1.7 steals, and 32.8 minutes per game. His efforts were rewarded when he was named to the All-Rookie First Team and started on the rookie team during the Rookie Challenge portion of All-Star Weekend. Iguodala finished fourth in voting for NBA Rookie of the Year.

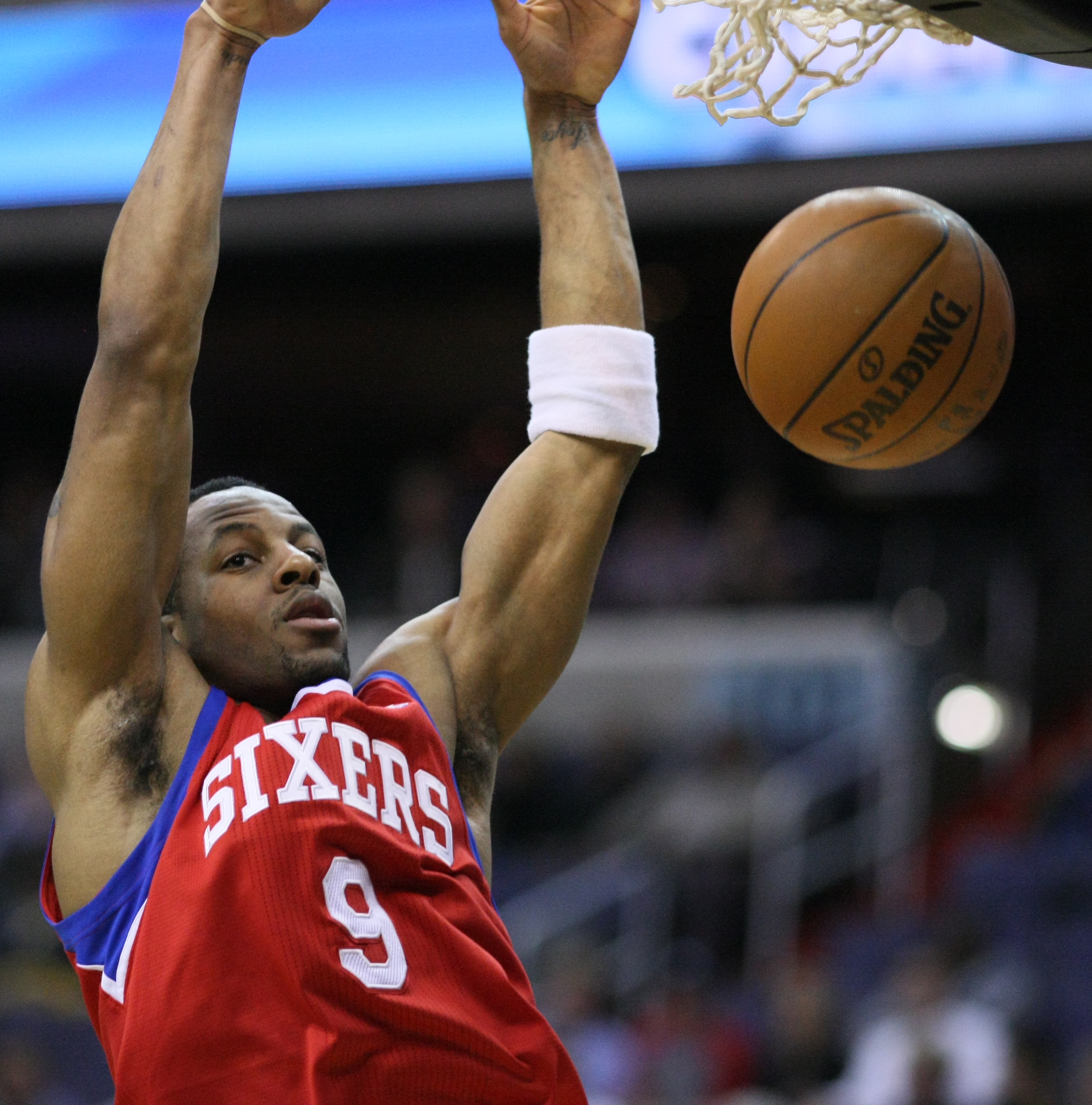
Iguodala competed in the 2006 Slam Dunk Contest.

==== 2005–06 season: Sophomore season ====
Already a fixture in the 76ers' starting rotation, Iguodala was the only Sixer to play in and start all 82 games in his second season. On February 17, 2006, at the Rookie Challenge, Iguodala won MVP honors for his 30-point performance in the Sophomores win. The next day, he participated in the Slam Dunk Contest. Iguodala's first dunk was a simple windmill. Next, he received a pass from Allen Iverson off the back side of the backboard, leapt beneath the board, and reverse dunked on the other side, earning a perfect score of 50 points. In the final round, Iguodala did a behind-the-back dunk and followed with a reverse. However, in a controversial decision, the award was given to Nate Robinson (who had missed 14 straight dunk attempts before succeeding on his last). Iguodala averaged 12.3 points and 5.9 rebounds on the season.

==== 2006–07 season: Leadership role ====
After Allen Iverson was traded to the Denver Nuggets and Chris Webber was released, Iguodala emerged as a team leader on the 76ers. At the time of Webber's release, the 76ers were 9–26 (Iverson only played 15 games before he was traded). Averaging 40.3 minutes per game during a late-season run, he paced the team to a 26–21 finish, just shy of the #8-seed in the Eastern Conference playoffs, albeit a record padded by other teams "tanking" to secure a higher draft pick. Iguodala went on to finish the season with averages of 18.2 points, 5.7 rebounds, and 5.7 assists, combined tallies matched or bettered only by LeBron James, Kobe Bryant, and Tracy McGrady.

==== 2007–08 season: Career high in scoring ====
Iguodala got off to a slow start to the season, even to a point where he was leading the league in turnovers. Iguodala began to step up his game as the season went on, leading Philadelphia to a playoff berth. The 76ers finished the season at 40–42, winning 22 of their last 29 games and earning a playoff spot with a victory over the Atlanta Hawks on April 4. Iguodala averaged a career-high 19.9 points, 5.4 rebounds, and 4.8 assists per game through the 82 games. Philadelphia was set to face the No. 2 seed Detroit. In the playoffs, the 76ers lost in the first round to the Pistons in six games despite a 2–1 lead. Iguodala had a poor postseason series, averaging 13 points per game.

==== 2008–09 season: Leading the NBA in minutes ====
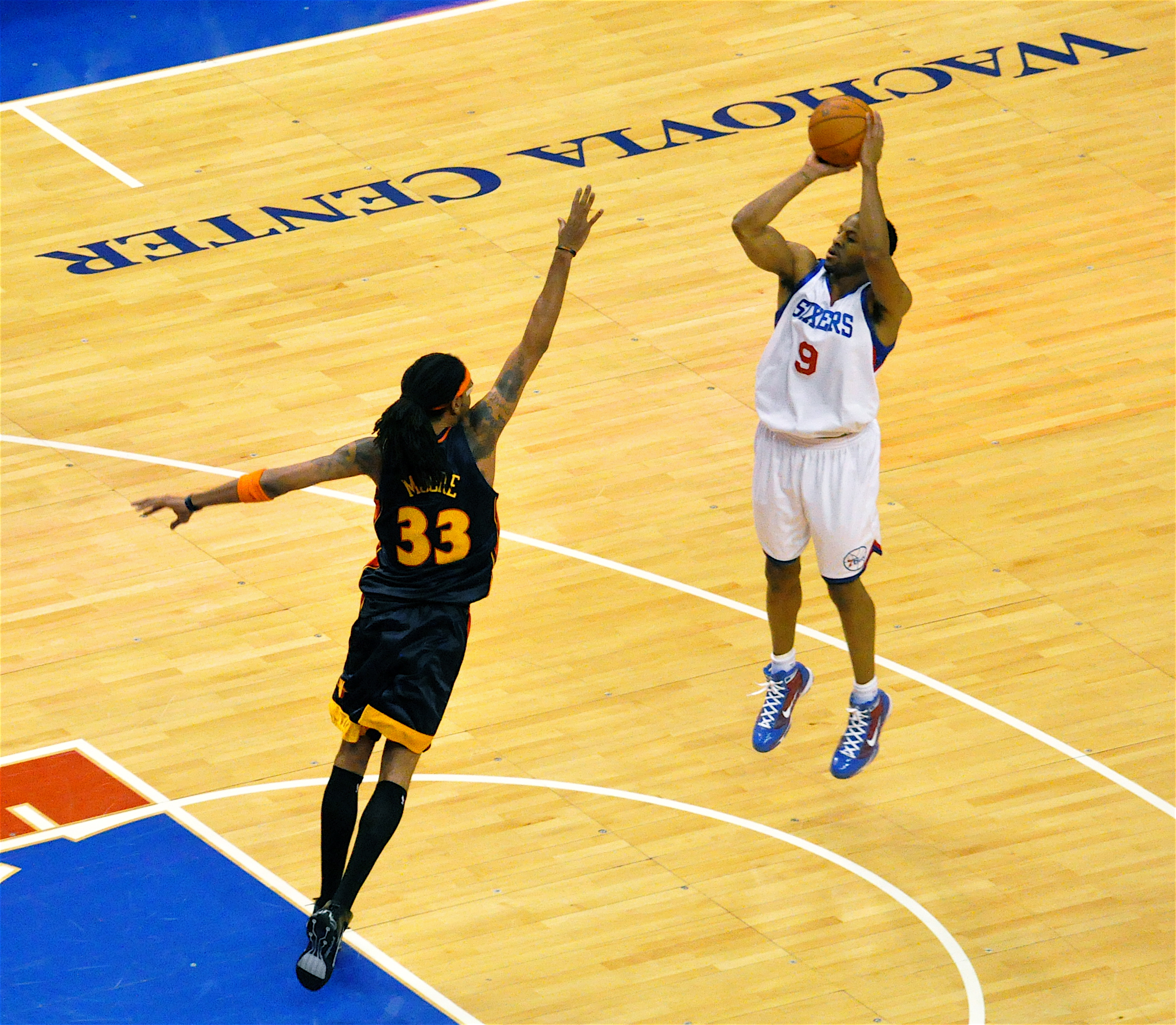
Iguodala pulls up for a jumper while being defended by Mikki Moore.

On August 17, 2008, Iguodala signed a six-year, $80 million contract extension with the 76ers. The contract had $5 million in bonuses and a player option for the sixth year.

Early on in the year, Iguodala was on a Sixers team with high expectations after signing All-Star forward Elton Brand and seeing the success of forward Thaddeus Young, whom they drafted with their lottery pick the prior year. Iguodala developed into more of a primary player in the 2008–09 season, becoming more active as a facilitator on the offensive end of the floor. Early into the season, Philadelphia was struggling, which led to the departure of head coach Maurice Cheeks. The 76ers played much better basketball under interim head coach Tony DiLeo. In his last year with co-captain and veteran point guard Andre Miller, Iguodala helped lead the 76ers to another playoff berth, finishing the season with a 41–41 season record and as the #6-seed in the Eastern Conference. In the playoffs the 76ers were set to face the third seed Orlando Magic. In Game 1, Orlando had an 18-point lead in the fourth quarter, but Philadelphia made an amazing comeback led by Iguodala, eventually scoring a step-back, fadeaway jumper in the face of Hedo Türkoğlu with 2.2 seconds remaining to give the 76ers the win. The 76ers eventually lost to the Magic in six games, failing to reach the second round. Iguodala had averaged 18.8 points, 5.7 rebounds, and 5.3 assists per game through 82 regular-season games.

==== 2009–10 season: Reunion with Allen Iverson ====
In the preseason, Philadelphia drafted point guard Jrue Holiday out of UCLA to take over the void left at point guard after the departure of veteran point guard Andre Miller, who had joined the Portland Trail Blazers. The Sixers hired coach Eddie Jordan to take over for Tony DiLeo. Iguodala averaged career-highs in rebounds, assists, and blocks, and a career-low in personal fouls. He finished the season averaging 17.1 points, 6.5 rebounds, 5.8 assists, and 1.7 steals. However, the 76ers were a big disappointment, going only 27–55 during the regular season and missing the playoffs after two straight playoff berths. During the season, the 76ers brought Iguodala's old friend Allen Iverson back in what would be his final season in the NBA before going to play overseas for Beşiktaş.

==== 2010–11 season: All-Defensive Second Team ====
Coming into the 2010–11 NBA season, the 76ers were expected to rebound from their poor season. They fired head coach Eddie Jordan and brought in Doug Collins. Philadelphia also traded veteran big man Samuel Dalembert to the Sacramento Kings for a younger center Spencer Hawes; the 76ers also acquired Andrés Nocioni in the deal. With the second overall pick in the draft, the Sixers made a big splash by drafting Evan Turner. Philadelphia started the season poorly but were one of the best teams down the stretch. During the season, Iguodala was hampered by an Achilles injury, leading to career lows in games played and started, field-goal percentage, free-throw percentage, and steals per game as the 76ers finished with a 41–41 record. However, Iguodala also had his career-best season in assists with 6.3 assists per game and helped the 76ers make the playoffs with the #7-seed in the Eastern Conference. During the year, Iguodala was the subject of multiple trade rumors that had him being traded to either the Golden State Warriors, Los Angeles Clippers or Los Angeles Lakers. In the playoffs, Iguodala had the assignment of guarding James and Dwyane Wade in the first round. The 76ers were eventually defeated by the Miami Heat in five games. For his defensive efforts throughout the season, Iguodala was named to the NBA All-Defensive Team Second Team, though his coaches and teammates lobbied for him to make the First Team. Iguodala showed his versatility during the season posting up a career-high in triple-doubles and was second behind James for most triple-doubles during the 2010–11 season.

==== 2011–12 season: All-Star selection ====
During the 2011 NBA lockout, Iguodala had a week-long internship with Merrill Lynch.

On his 28th birthday, Iguodala recorded a 10-point, 10-rebound, 10-assist triple-double effort in a 95–74 victory over the Pistons. Later that season, he was selected to his first All-Star Game as a reserve. Iguodala's scoring average was the lowest of all the 24 All-Stars, but he was rewarded for being the best player on the 76ers, who were leading the Atlantic Division. Collins called Iguodala a "stat-sheet stuffer." At the end of the 2011–12 NBA season, Iguodala averaged 12.4 points, 6.1 rebounds, 5.5 assists, and 1.7 steals. He helped the 76ers clinch the final seed in the playoffs. In Game 6 of the first-round playoff series against the Chicago Bulls, he made two free throws with 2.2 seconds left to win the game and help the 76ers upset the Bulls en route to the franchise's first playoff series win since 2003. This was also the fifth time in NBA history that a #8-seed defeated a #1-seed in the opening round of the playoffs. The 76ers were eventually eliminated by the Boston Celtics in a thrilling seven games in the Conference Semifinals.

=== Denver Nuggets (2012–2013) ===
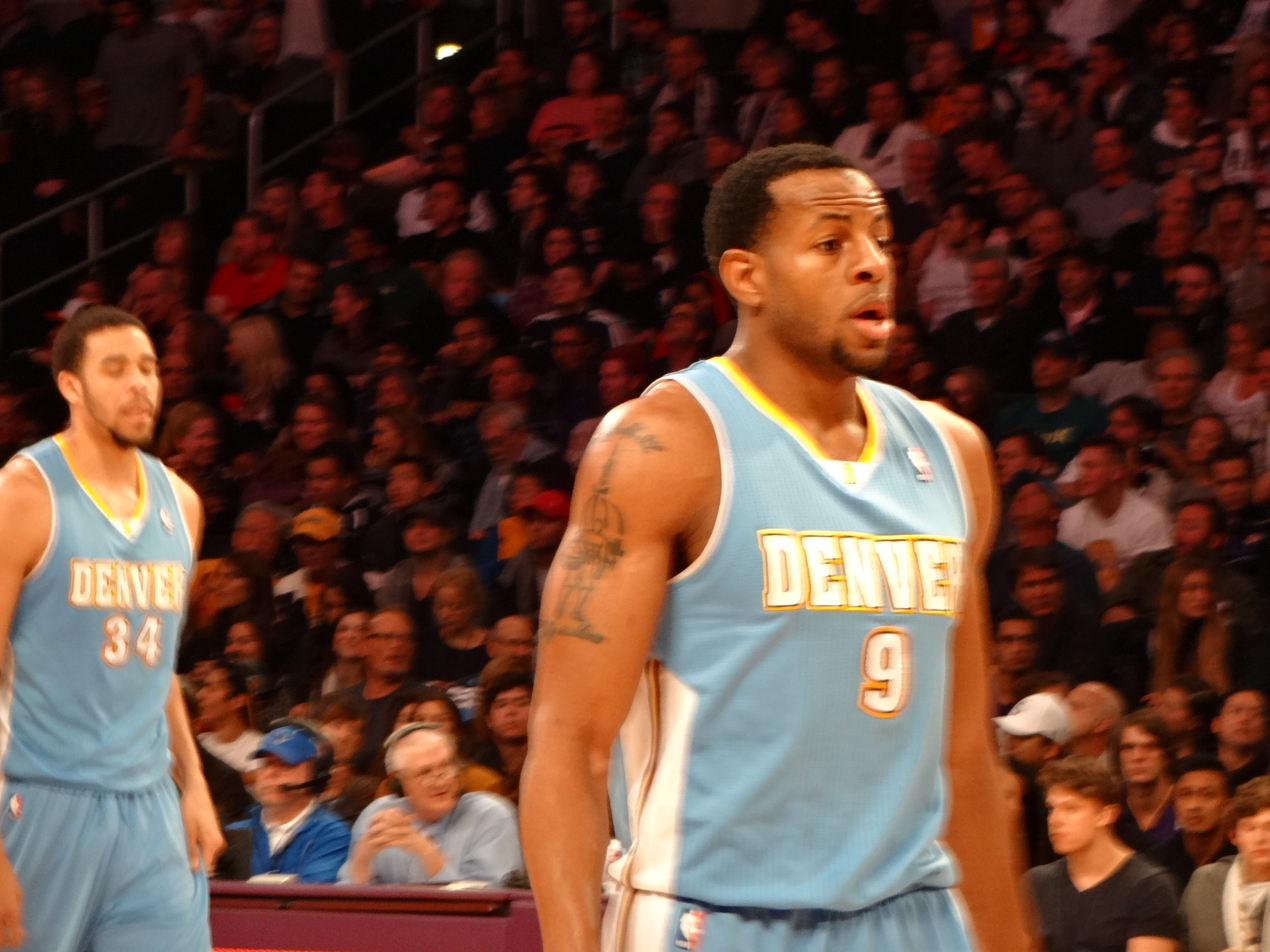
Iguodala as a member of the Denver Nuggets

On August 10, 2012, Iguodala was traded to the Denver Nuggets in a four-team trade involving the Sixers, Los Angeles Lakers, and Orlando Magic. Other players involved in the deal included Andrew Bynum and Jason Richardson, who were acquired by the Sixers, and Dwight Howard who was acquired by the Lakers. The trade was completed just before Iguodala was to participate in the Semifinal game of the 2012 Summer Olympics, during Team USA’s dominant victory over Argentina. His arrival in Denver led to some league experts labeling Denver a contender. Iguodala returned on opening night of 2012–13 to play his former team. Iguodala put up 11 points in an 84–75 loss, and received a mixed response from the crowd. The Nuggets went on to make the playoffs with a franchise-record 57–25, and a team record 15 consecutive wins; however, they were upset in the first round by the Golden State Warriors, despite Iguodala having a good series, averaging 18 points, 8.0 rebounds, 5.3 assists, and 2.0 steals per game in the series. This led to the firing of Nuggets coach George Karl, who had just won the NBA Coach of the Year Award.

=== Golden State Warriors (2013–2019) ===
==== 2013–14 season: All-Defensive First Team ====
In July 2013, Iguodala declined a five-year deal with Denver and agreed to a four-year for a reported $48 million with the Golden State Warriors. He officially joined the Warriors in a three-team sign-and-trade deal with the Nuggets and the Utah Jazz. On November 14, Iguodala made the game-winning, buzzer-beating shot in the Warriors' 116–115 victory over the Oklahoma City Thunder. Getting the inbound pass from Klay Thompson, Iguodala turned and made the fade-away jump shot over the Thunder's Thabo Sefolosha. Iguodala finished with 14 points and nine assists. When playing against the Los Angeles Lakers on November 23, 2013, Iguodala strained his left hamstring late in the third quarter and went on to miss 12 consecutive games. However, on December 17, 2013, Iguodala returned to action in a game against the New Orleans Pelicans. On January 3, 2014, he hit a game-winning, three-point buzzer-beater during the Warriors' 101–100 victory over the Atlanta Hawks. The win extended the Warriors' season-high winning streak to eight games. For his defensive contributions to the Warriors, Iguodala was named to the 2014 All-NBA Defensive first team.

==== 2014–15 season: First NBA championship and Finals MVP ====
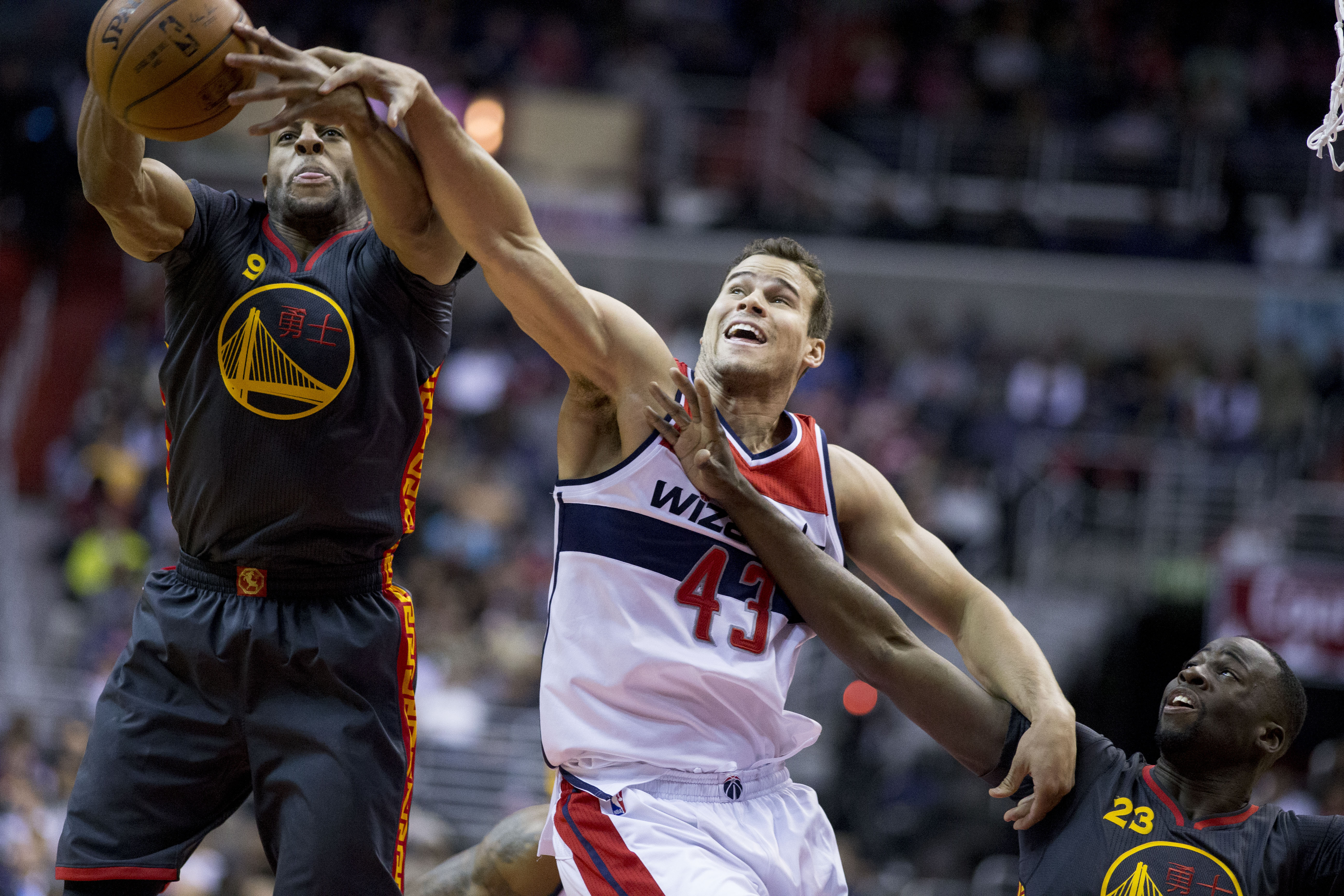
Iguodala fighting for the ball

Entering the 2014–15 season, first-year Warriors coach Steve Kerr elected to move Iguodala from the starting rotation to the sixth man reserve position, in favor of forward Harrison Barnes. Since entering the NBA, Iguodala had played in 806 games as a starter without entering a game as a reserve, a league high over that span. On March 18, 2015, he scored a then season-high 21 points on 9-of-12 shooting in a 114–95 win over the Atlanta Hawks. The Warriors advanced to the 2015 NBA Finals to face the Cleveland Cavaliers, where he was the team's best defender against Cavaliers star LeBron James. With Golden State down 2–1 in the series, Iguodala made his first start of the season, replacing center Andrew Bogut in Game 4. Iguodala scored a season-high 22 points on 8-of-15 shooting, which included four three-pointers. The Warriors' small lineup, which came to be known as the Death Lineup, helped turn the series around. The Warriors defeated the Cavaliers in six games, and Iguodala was named the Finals MVP, becoming the first player to win the award without starting a game during the regular season. He was also the first Finals MVP to not have started every game in the Finals. Iguodala finished the series averaging 16.3 points, 4.0 assists, and 5.8 rebounds. When Iguodala was in the game, James made only 38.1% of his shots, compared to 44% without Iguodala.

==== 2015–16 season: Sixth Man of the Year runner-up ====
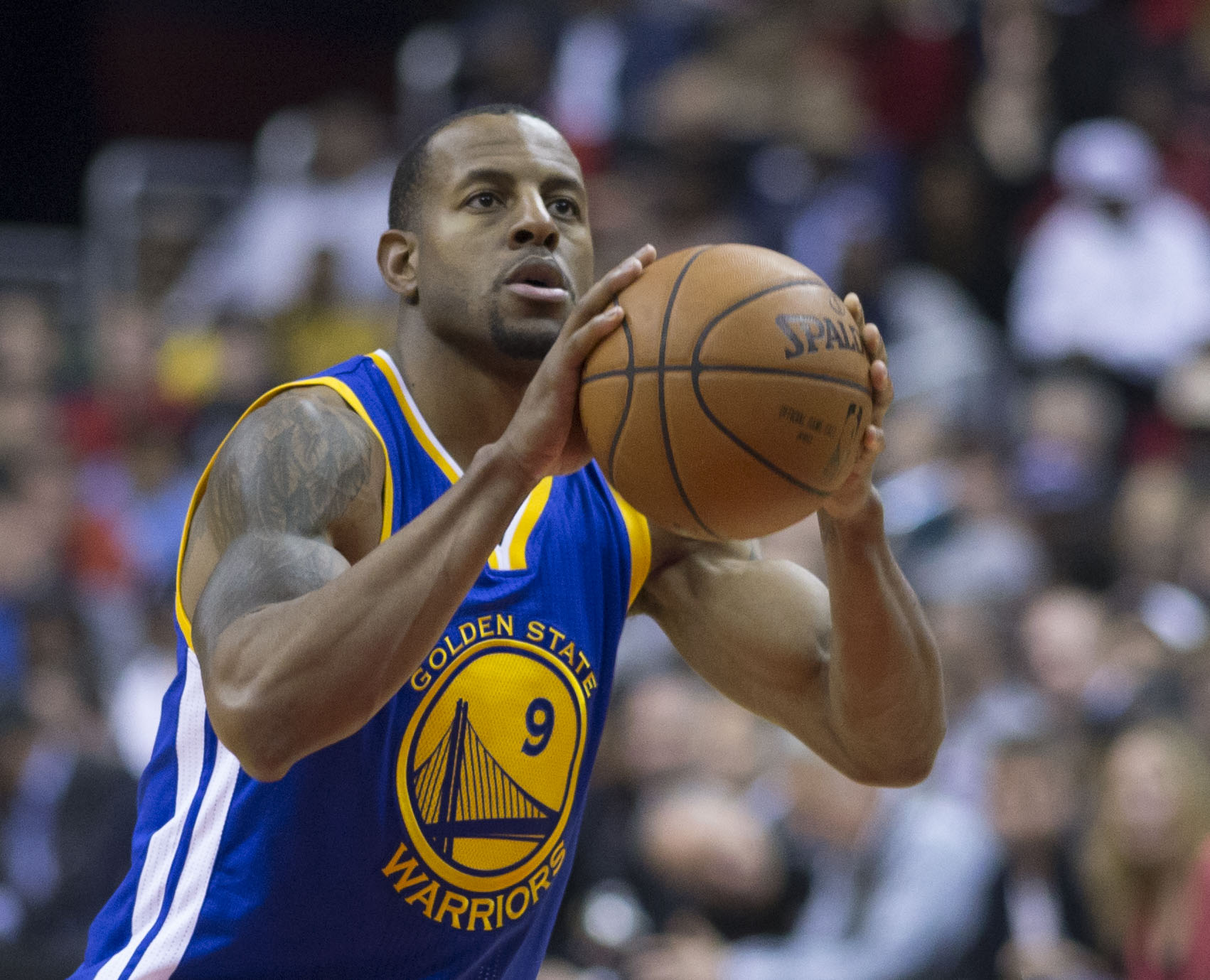
Iguodala in 2016

On November 11, 2015, Iguodala scored a season-high 20 points against the Memphis Grizzlies to help the Warriors begin the season 9–0. The Warriors' NBA-record start ended after 24 wins when they lost to the Milwaukee Bucks by a score 108–95 on December 12. An ankle injury suffered in early March forced Iguodala to miss 13 straight games. The Warriors finished the regular season as the first seed in the Western Conference with a 73–9 record, the best overall record in NBA history, surpassing the 1995–96 Chicago Bulls' mark of 72–10, while Iguodala finished as runner-up for the 2015–16 NBA Sixth Man of the Year Award.

In the first round of the playoffs, the Warriors faced the #8-seed Houston Rockets, and in a Game 4 win on April 24, Iguodala scored a season-high 22 points. The Warriors went on to defeat the Rockets in five games. In the second round, Iguodala helped the Warriors defeat the Portland Trail Blazers in five games to qualify for the Western Conference Finals. In their conference finals match-up with the Oklahoma City Thunder, Iguodala helped the Warriors fight back from a 3–1 deficit in the series to win clinch a 4–3 victory. In Game 6 of the series, Iguodala's defense on Kevin Durant and Russell Westbrook was key to the Warriors forcing Game 7. In Game 7, Iguodala started in place of Harrison Barnes and again marked Kevin Durant. With a Game 7 victory, the Warriors moved on to the NBA Finals for the second straight year. The Warriors would again play the Cleveland Cavaliers for the championship. Despite the Warriors going up 3–1 in the series following a Game 4 victory, they went on to lose the series in seven games to become the first team in NBA history to lose the championship series after being up 3–1. In the deciding Game 7 with the score tied at 89 late in the game, Iguodala was going for a potential layup when Cleveland's James recovered for a chase-down block with 1:50 remaining, a play which came to be known as "The Block."

==== 2016–17 season: Second NBA championship ====
On November 28, 2016, Iguodala had a season-best game with 12 points, five rebounds, and five assists in a 105–100 win over the Atlanta Hawks, helping the Warriors start the season 16–2 while recording their 12th straight victory—equal to their third-longest streak in franchise history. On January 16, 2017, he came off the bench to make all five of his field goal attempts for a season-high 14 points in a 126–91 win over the Cleveland Cavaliers. In February 2017, long-time agent Rob Pelinka was appointed as the new general manager for the Los Angeles Lakers; Iguodala chose to remain with the Landmark Sports Agency, and co-founder Brandon Rosenthal took over as Iguodala's agent. On March 6, 2017, Iguodala set a new season high with 24 points in a 119–111 win over the Atlanta Hawks. On March 13, 2017, he was fined $10,000 by the NBA for using racially intemperate language in an interview following the Warriors' loss to the Minnesota Timberwolves on March 10.

The Warriors finished the season as the first seed in the West with a 67–15 record. Following a 129–115 victory in Game 4 of the Western Conference Finals over the Spurs, the Warriors reached their third straight NBA Finals series while becoming the first team in league history to start the playoffs 12–0. The Warriors would again matchup with the Cleveland Cavaliers in the NBA Finals where Iguodala was a key bench player during the 2017 NBA Finals, often guarding James and scored 20 points in Game 5, helping the Warriors win the championship by defeating the Cavaliers in five games. The Warriors finished the playoffs with a 16–1 record, the best postseason winning percentage in NBA history.

==== 2017–18 season: Third NBA championship ====
Iguodala entered the 2017 off-season as a free agent and held meetings with numerous competing teams, including the Los Angeles Lakers, San Antonio Spurs, Sacramento Kings, and Houston Rockets. However, on July 25, 2017, Iguodala re-signed with the Warriors on a three-year, $48 million contract.

On December 11, 2017, against the Portland Trail Blazers, Iguodala played his 1,000th regular-season game, becoming one of 126 players in NBA history to accomplish the feat. Iguodala played in Game 3 of the 2018 NBA Finals after missing the final four games of the Western Conference Finals and the first two games of the NBA Finals with a left lateral leg contusion. The Warriors went on to win their third championship in four years with a sweep of the Cavaliers.

==== 2018–19 season: Fifth NBA Finals appearance ====
Iguodala averaged 5.7 points, 3.7 rebounds and 3.2 assists in the regular season. During the playoffs, he boosted his averages to 9.8 points, 4.3 rebounds and 4.0 assists, while also starting a majority of the games. In a sign of respect towards their opponent and with an increased urgency, Kerr opened the conference semifinals against Houston by moving Iguodala from the bench and starting their Death Lineup for the first time in the season. After starting nine consecutive games, he missed the deciding Game 4 in the Western Conference Finals against Portland with a sore left calf injury from Game 3. The Warriors returned to the NBA Finals for the fifth straight season, but lost in six games to the Toronto Raptors. In a 114–110 series-ending loss in Game 6, Iguodala had 22 points for his best scoring output of the postseason. However, Thompson left the game in the third quarter after tearing the anterior cruciate ligament (ACL) in his left knee, and Durant was already sidelined after tearing his right Achilles tendon in Game 5.

=== Miami Heat (2020–2021) ===
==== 2019–20 season: Sixth NBA Finals appearance ====
On July 7, 2019, Golden State traded Iguodala along with a protected first-round draft pick to the Memphis Grizzlies for Julian Washburn. The Warriors received a traded player exception in the deal. Golden State was eyeing a replacement for Thompson while he recovered from his injury, and the trade freed salary cap space for them to acquire All-Star guard D'Angelo Russell in a sign-and-trade package with the Brooklyn Nets for Durant, who had announced earlier that he planned to sign with the Nets. Afterwards, the Warriors stated that they planned to eventually retire Iguodala's No. 9 jersey.

The Grizzlies, who were rebuilding, reached an agreement before training camp to allow Iguodala to stay away from the team and train on his own. They kept Iguodala on their 15-man opening day roster instead of buying out the 35-year-old veteran, who was earning $17 million in the last year of his contract. Memphis was hoping for a quality trade with a playoff contender in exchange for Iguodala and his championship experience. Iguodala's decision to remain away from the team drew backlash from teammates, notably Dillon Brooks and Ja Morant, who said his refusal to play was disrespectful.

On February 6, 2020, Iguodala was traded to the Miami Heat in a three-team trade along with Jae Crowder and Solomon Hill with Memphis and Minnesota. As part of the trade, he agreed to a two-year, $30 million extension with Miami, with the last year being a team option. The Heat reached the 2020 NBA Finals, where they lost 4–2 to the Los Angeles Lakers. Iguodala became the tenth player in NBA history to make it to six straight Finals.

==== 2020–21 season: First-round exit ====
Iguodala continued with the Heat in a bench-role in 2020–21. After the season, Miami did not exercise their $15 million option on his contract for the 2021–22 season, making Iguodala a free agent.

=== Return to Golden State (2021–2023) ===
==== 2021–22 season: Fourth NBA championship ====
On August 10, 2021, Iguodala returned to the Golden State Warriors. He missed 31 games from January to April with back soreness. Iguodala went on to win his fourth championship after the Warriors defeated the Boston Celtics in six games of the 2022 NBA Finals, in limited playing time.

==== 2022–23 season: Final season ====
On September 23, 2022, Iguodala re-signed with the Warriors on a one-year, fully guaranteed, $2.9 million contract (the veteran's minimum) and announced his decision to retire after the season.

After missing the first 39 games due to a hip injury, Iguodala made his season debut on January 8, 2023, in a 115–101 loss to the Orlando Magic. In just his eighth appearance, Iguodala fractured his left wrist against the Phoenix Suns, requiring surgery.

=== Retirement ===
On October 20, 2023, Iguodala announced his retirement after 19 seasons in the NBA. On February 23, 2025, the Golden State Warriors retired his No. 9 jersey in a ceremony at Chase Center, honoring Iguodala's significant contributions during his time with the team.

== National team career ==
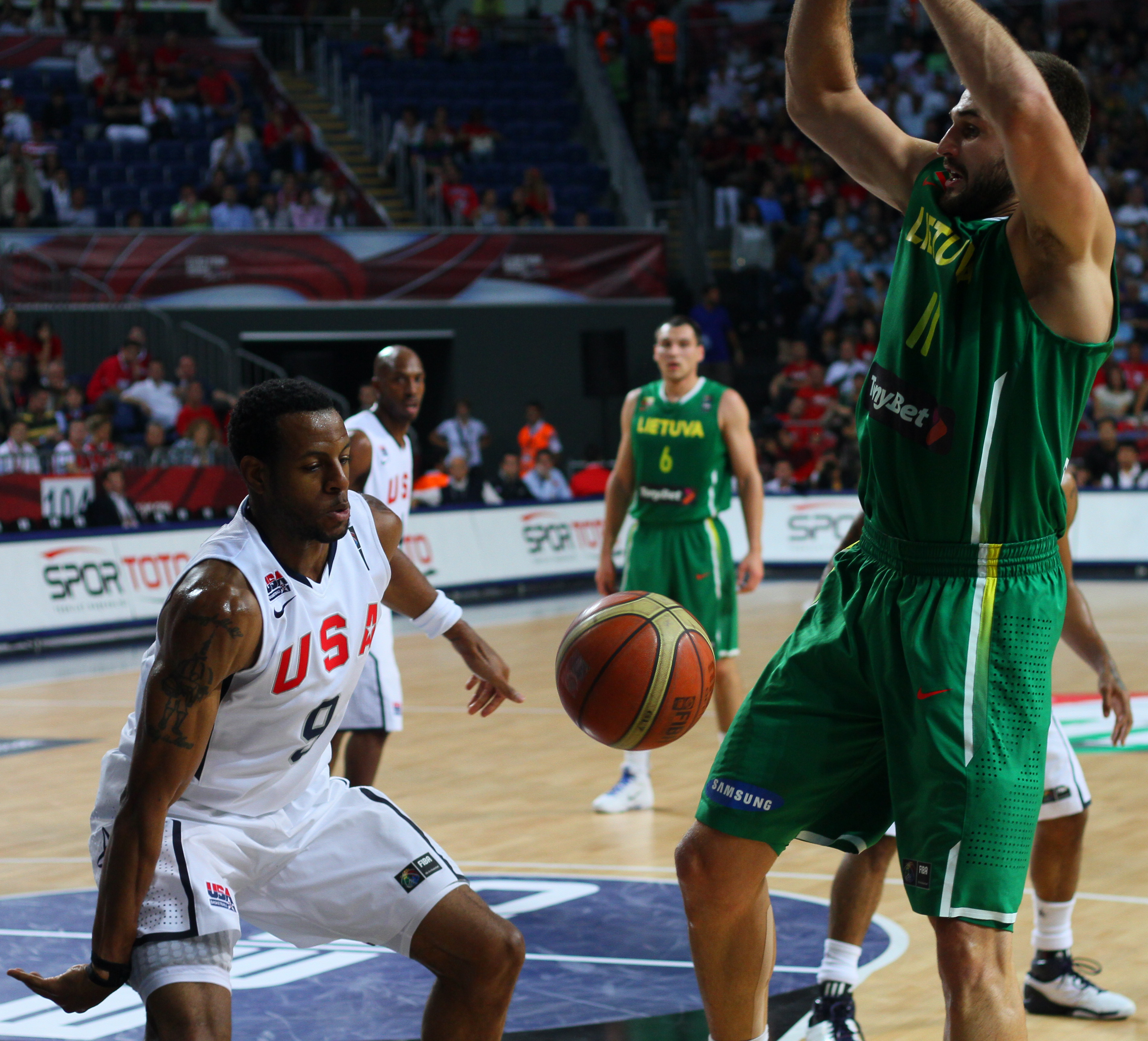
Iguodala (left) strips the ball from Linas Kleiza as a member of Team USA.

Iguodala was a member of the U.S. national team in the 2010 FIBA World Championship, winning the gold medal. There, he displayed his athleticism with an array of fastbreak dunks.

Iguodala was also selected for the 2012 London Olympics team, largely due to his exceptional defensive ability. He helped Team USA win the gold medal against Spain in a 107–100 victory. Coach Mike Krzyzewski called Iguodala one of the team's best players, and compared his game to that of Scottie Pippen.

Iguodala also won a bronze medal with the United States at the FIBA Americas Under-18 Championship in 2002.

== Personal life ==
In August 2015, Iguodala married his childhood sweetheart, Christina Gutierrez. They have two children. On June 25, 2019, Iguodala released The Sixth Man: A Memoir.

Iguodala is a Christian. He has said, "Faith is something I heavily lean on to give me that balance. I make sure I stay in chapel and have a good relationship with our chaplain. It keeps me focused … When people see us on the court, we want them to see God's work. We want to be a good representation of what we believe in …When you go out there, you’re not just representing your country or the NBA, you’re representing your beliefs. You want to play hard for someone who died for you."

The Sporting News named Iguodala one of "the good guys of 2006" for establishing the Andre Iguodala Disaster Relief Fund that raised money for tornado victims in his hometown of Springfield, Illinois. He later established the Andre Iguodala Youth Foundation, whose stated mission is to use sports as a means to help youths. The organization has hosted basketball camps and the annual "Thanksgiving with Dre", which has distributed food baskets to families in need.

Alongside teammate Stephen Curry, Iguodala is known to be an avid golfer. He enjoys playing video games, particularly the NBA 2K series. Iguodala played in a tournament put together at the NBA 2K10 launch party in New York City against other NBA players Nate Robinson, Brook Lopez, and Rajon Rondo along with rapper Wale.

In March 2015, Twice, an online secondhand apparel outlet, named Iguodala its Menswear Style Director.

Iguodala appeared as a fictionalized version of himself in the second season of Abbott Elementary in 2022.

== Media figure and business interests ==
Iguodala is a tech investor and a leading advocate for athletes in the NBA to invest in the technology industry. His partnership with entrepreneurs in San Francisco's Silicon Valley has led to an annual event tagged Players Technology Summit. The inaugural edition of the event began in 2017 where Iguodala and teammate Stephen Curry played hosts. The second edition saw other athletes from the NBA like Kevin Durant and Jaylen Brown make debuts. The Players Technology Summit, sponsored by Bloomberg, was established as a platform to set a discourse and help shape conversations for athletes' financial future through opportunities in the technology industry. At a launch event on June 3, 2023, Bay Area-based professional women's soccer club Bay FC announced that Iguodala was a minority owner of the team. Iguodala is also a minority shareholder in the Premier League soccer club Leeds United.

Together with partner Rudy Cline-Thomas, Iguodala has been able to invest in companies like Facebook, Twitter, and Tesla. The two have also invested in at least 25 different startups in the technology industry.

Iguodala is a Venture Partner in the Catalyst Fund, which invests in underrepresented founders and entrepreneurs of tech companies.

In May 2024, Iguodala was inducted into the Boys & Girls Clubs of America 2024 Alumni Hall of Fame class.

== National Basketball Players Association ==
In February 2019, Iguodala was elected first vice-president of the National Basketball Players Association (NBPA), succeeding LeBron James. Iguodala had previously served as vice-president of the NBPA executive committee starting in 2013.

On November 9, 2023, the National Basketball Players Association (NBPA) executive committee appointed Iguodala as acting executive director. He assumed the role full-time three months later. Under Iguodala's leadership, the NBAPA underwent a significant restructuring, which included laying off numerous employees. His term expired in July 2026 and he was succeeded by the union's managing director and general counsel, David Kelly.

== Career statistics ==
Legend
GP	Games played	GS	Games started	MPG	Minutes per game
FG%	Field goal percentage	3P%	3-point field goal percentage	FT%	Free throw percentage
RPG	Rebounds per game	APG	Assists per game	SPG	Steals per game
BPG	Blocks per game	PPG	Points per game	**Bold**	Career high
†	Won an NBA championship	*	Led the league

=== NBA ===
==== Regular season ====
Year	Team	GP	GS	MPG	FG%	3P%	FT%	RPG	APG	SPG	BPG	PPG
2004–05	Philadelphia	**82**	**82***	32.8	.493	.331	.743	5.7	3.0	1.7	.6	9.0
2005–06	Philadelphia	**82***	**82***	37.6	.500	.354	.754	5.9	3.1	1.6	.3	12.3
2006–07	Philadelphia	76	76	**40.3**	.447	.310	**.820**	5.7	5.7	2.0	.4	18.2
2007–08	Philadelphia	**82***	**82***	39.5	.456	.329	.721	5.4	4.8	**2.1**	.6	**19.9**
2008–09	Philadelphia	**82***	**82***	39.9*	.473	.307	.724	5.7	5.3	1.6	.4	18.8
2009–10	Philadelphia	**82***	**82***	38.9	.443	.310	.733	**6.5**	5.8	1.7	.7	17.1
2010–11	Philadelphia	67	67	36.9	.445	.337	.693	5.8	**6.3**	1.5	.6	14.1
2011–12	Philadelphia	62	62	35.6	.454	**.394**	.617	6.1	5.5	1.7	.5	12.4
2012–13	Denver	80	80	34.7	.451	.317	.574	5.3	5.4	1.7	.7	13.0
2013–14	Golden State	63	63	32.4	.480	.354	.652	4.7	4.2	1.5	.3	9.3
2014–15†	Golden State	77	0	26.9	.466	.349	.596	3.3	3.0	1.2	.3	7.8
2015–16	Golden State	65	1	26.6	.478	.351	.614	4.0	3.4	1.1	.3	7.0
2016–17†	Golden State	76	0	26.3	**.528**	.362	.706	4.0	3.4	1.0	.5	7.6
2017–18†	Golden State	64	7	25.3	.463	.282	.632	3.8	3.3	.8	.6	6.0
2018–19	Golden State	68	13	23.2	.500	.333	.582	3.7	3.2	.9	.8	5.7
2019–20	Miami	21	0	19.9	.432	.298	.400	3.7	2.4	.7	**1.0**	4.6
2020–21	Miami	63	5	21.3	.383	.330	.658	3.5	2.3	.9	.6	4.4
2021–22†	Golden State	31	0	19.5	.380	.230	.750	3.2	3.7	.9	.7	4.0
2022–23	Golden State	8	0	14.1	.467	.111	.667	2.1	2.4	.5	.4	2.1
Career		1,231	784	32.1	.463	.330	.709	4.9	4.2	1.4	.5	11.3
All-Star		1	0	14.0	.857	.000	–	4.0	2.0	1.0	1.0	12.0

==== Playoffs ====
Year	Team	GP	GS	MPG	FG%	3P%	FT%	RPG	APG	SPG	BPG	PPG
2005	Philadelphia	5	5	38.4	.465	.333	.500	4.6	3.0	**2.8**	1.0	9.8
2008	Philadelphia	6	6	39.0	.333	.143	**.721**	4.8	5.0	2.2	.2	13.2
2009	Philadelphia	6	6	**44.8**	.449	.393	.652	6.3	6.7	1.8	.0	**21.5**
2011	Philadelphia	5	5	36.4	.423	.214	.714	7.0	**6.8**	1.0	.4	11.4
2012	Philadelphia	13	13	38.8	.384	.388	.589	5.7	3.7	1.5	.4	12.9
2013	Denver	6	6	40.5	.500	.483	.720	**8.0**	5.3	2.0	.3	18.0
2014	Golden State	7	7	35.4	.516	**.533**	.606	4.7	4.4	1.3	.3	13.1
2015†	Golden State	21	3	30.2	.474	.354	.415	4.5	3.6	1.2	.3	10.4
2016	Golden State	**24**	3	32.0	.476	.385	.561	4.4	3.8	1.2	.4	8.9
2017†	Golden State	16	0	26.2	.455	.190	.577	4.1	3.2	.9	.4	7.2
2018†	Golden State	15	12	26.7	.494	.378	.706	4.5	2.7	1.4	.5	8.1
2019	Golden State	21	**15**	30.0	.494	.350	.378	4.3	4.0	1.1	**1.1**	9.8
2020	Miami	21	0	19.5	.462	.359	.714	2.6	1.5	.8	.6	3.8
2021	Miami	4	0	17.8	**.545**	.429	.000	3.0	1.3	1.0	.5	3.8
2022†	Golden State	7	0	8.7	.444	.333	.667	1.0	1.7	.0	.3	1.6
Career		177	81	29.8	.458	.355	.583	4.4	3.5	1.2	.5	9.4

=== College ===
Year	Team	GP	GS	MPG	FG%	3P%	FT%	RPG	APG	SPG	BPG	PPG
2002–03	Arizona	**32**	4	19.2	.381	.205	.670	4.9	2.1	1.5	**.6**	6.4
2003–04	Arizona	30	**30**	**32.1**	**.450**	**.315**	**.788**	**8.4**	**4.9**	**1.6**	.4	**12.9**
Career		62	34	25.4	.424	.274	.738	6.6	3.4	1.5	.5	9.6

== Publications ==
- Iguodala, Andre; Wallace, Carvell (2019). The Sixth Man: A Memoir. Blue Rider Press. ISBN 978-0525533986.

== See also ==
- List of NBA career steals leaders
- List of NBA seasons played leaders
- List of NBA career games played leaders
- List of NBA career playoff games played leaders
- List of NBA annual minutes leaders
