= 2010–11 Philadelphia 76ers season =

NBA professional basketball team season

- Head coach: Doug Collins
- General manager: Ed Stefanski
- Owners: Comcast Spectacor
- Arena: Wells Fargo Center

Results
- Record: 41–41 (.500)
- Place: Division: 3rd (Atlantic); Conference: 7th (Eastern)
- Playoff finish: First Round (lost to Heat 1–4)
- Stats at Basketball Reference

Local media
- Television: CSN Philadelphia (73 games); Comcast Network Philadelphia (8 games)
- Radio: WIP; WPHT

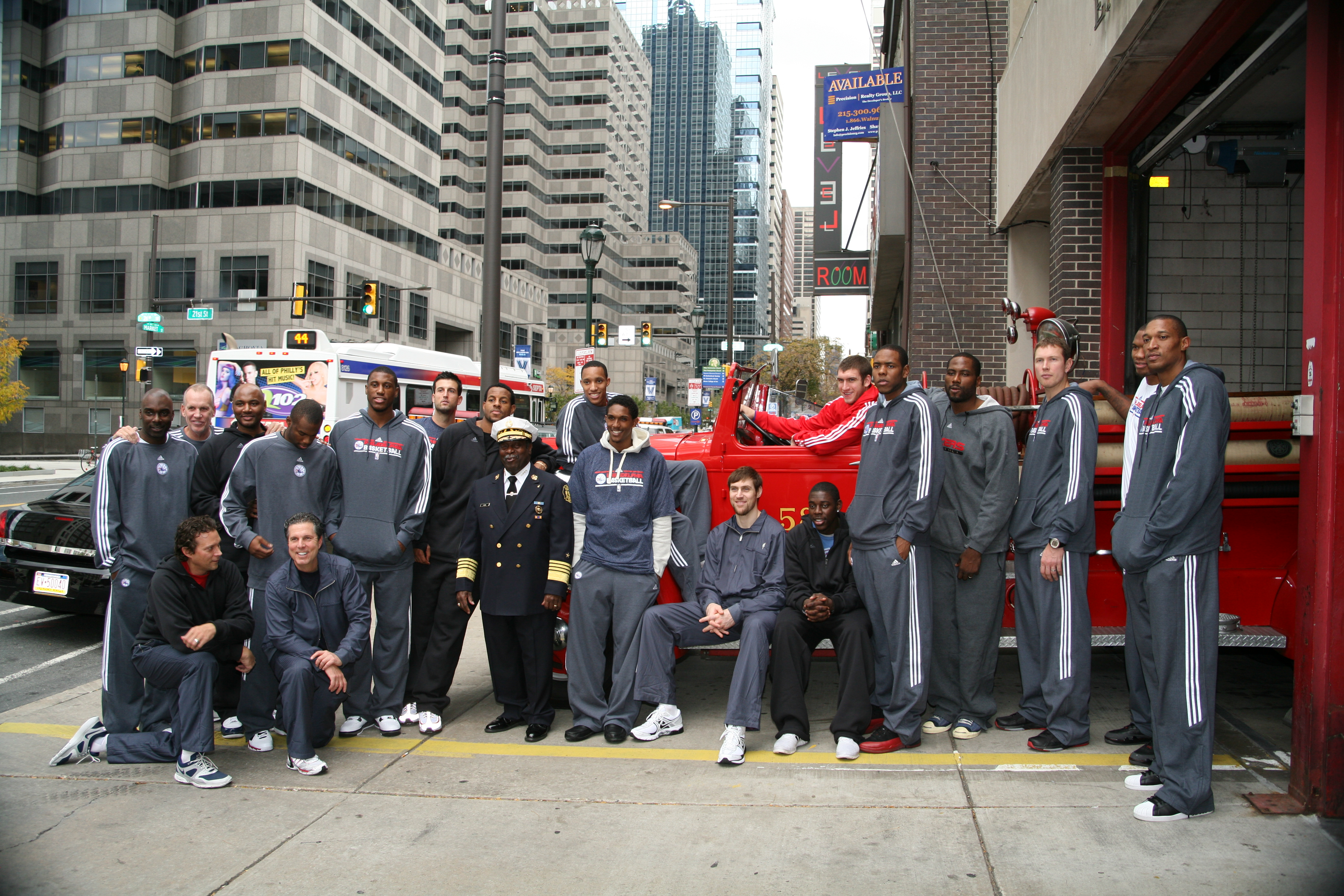
The team at the end of the 2010 preseason

The 2010–11 Philadelphia 76ers season is the 72nd season of the franchise, 62nd in the National Basketball Association (NBA), and the 48th in Philadelphia.

The Sixers 41–41 record earned them 7th in the Eastern Conference. In the playoffs, they lost to the eventual Eastern Conference champion Miami Heat, who added LeBron James and Chris Bosh to join Dwyane Wade, in the first round in five games.

== Key Dates ==
- May 21 – NBA on TNT broadcaster Doug Collins was named as head coach of the Philadelphia 76ers.
- June 17 – The Sixers traded center Samuel Dalembert to the Sacramento Kings in exchange for forward Andrés Nocioni and center Spencer Hawes.
- June 24 – The NBA draft was held in New York City.
- July 1 – The free agency period started.

== Draft picks ==
Round	Pick	Player	Position	Nationality	College
1	2	Evan Turner	SG/SF	United States	Ohio State University

== Roster ==
2010–11 Philadelphia 76ers roster
Players

Pos.	No.	Player	Height	Weight	DOB	From
C	4	Tony Battie	6 ft 11 in (2.11 m)	240 lb (109 kg)	1976-02-11	Texas Tech
PF	33	Craig Brackins	6 ft 10 in (2.08 m)	230 lb (104 kg)	1987-10-09	Iowa State
PF	42	Elton Brand	6 ft 9 in (2.06 m)	254 lb (115 kg)	1979-03-11	Duke
PG	22	Antonio Daniels	6 ft 4 in (1.93 m)	195 lb (88 kg)	1975-03-19	Bowling Green
C	00	Spencer Hawes	7 ft 1 in (2.16 m)	245 lb (111 kg)	1988-04-28	Washington
PG	11	Jrue Holiday	6 ft 3 in (1.91 m)	180 lb (82 kg)	1990-06-12	UCLA
SF	9	Andre Iguodala	6 ft 6 in (1.98 m)	207 lb (94 kg)	1984-01-28	Arizona
SF	72	Jason Kapono	6 ft 8 in (2.03 m)	213 lb (97 kg)	1981-02-04	UCLA
SG	20	Jodie Meeks	6 ft 4 in (1.93 m)	208 lb (94 kg)	1987-08-21	Kentucky
SF	5	Andres Nocioni	6 ft 7 in (2.01 m)	225 lb (102 kg)	1979-11-30	Argentina
C	25	Darius Songaila	6 ft 9 in (2.06 m)	248 lb (112 kg)	1978-02-14	Wake Forest
C	16	Marreese Speights	6 ft 10 in (2.08 m)	245 lb (111 kg)	1987-08-04	Florida
SG	12	Evan Turner	6 ft 7 in (2.01 m)	205 lb (93 kg)	1988-10-27	Ohio State
SG	23	Louis Williams	6 ft 1 in (1.85 m)	175 lb (79 kg)	1986-10-27	South Gwinnett HS (GA)
PF	21	Thaddeus Young	6 ft 8 in (2.03 m)	220 lb (100 kg)	1988-06-21	Georgia Tech

Coaches
Head coach
- Doug Collins
Assistant(s)
- Michael Curry
- Brian James
- Aaron McKie
- Quin Snyder

Legend
- (DP) Unsigned draft pick
- (FA) Free agent
- (S) Suspended
- Injured

Roster
Updated: April 5, 2011

== Pre-season ==
=== Game log ===
2010 pre-season game log
Pre-season: 2–5 (home: 2–1; road: 0–4)

Game	Date	Team	Score	High points	High rebounds	High assists	Location Attendance	Record
1	October 5	New Jersey	L 96–103	Marreese Speights (19)	Marreese Speights (9)	Jrue Holiday (4)	Roanoke Civic Center; 4,114	0–1
2	October 6	@ Boston	L 65–93	Thaddeus Young (17)	Jrue Holiday (6)	Thaddeus Young, Marreese Speights, Lou Williams (2)	Verizon Wireless Arena; 10,038	0–2
3	October 9	@ New Jersey	L 89–90	Andre Iguodala (20)	Elton Brand (11)	Evan Turner (7)	Prudential Center; 6,252	0–3
4	October 12	Boston	W 103–92	Marreese Speights (19)	Jrue Holiday (7)	Jrue Holiday (7)	Wells Fargo Center; 7,835	1–3
5	October 13	@ Toronto	L 116–119 (2OT)	Jrue Holiday (18)	Evan Turner (12)	Jrue Holiday (12)	Air Canada Centre; 12,078	1–4
6	October 19	@ Cleveland	L 95–111	Andre Iguodala (19)	Andre Iguodala (10)	Andre Iguodala, Evan Turner (6)	U.S. Bank Arena; 6,217	1–5
7	October 20	New York	W 118–91	Andre Iguodala, Jason Kapono (20)	Elton Brand (11)	Jrue Holiday (11)	Wells Fargo Center; 6,473	2–5

2010–11 season schedule

== Regular season ==
=== Standings ===
Atlantic Division	W	L	PCT	GB	Home	Road	Div
y-Boston Celtics	56	26	.683	–	33–8	23–18	13–3
x-New York Knicks	42	40	.512	14	23–18	19–22	10–6
x-Philadelphia 76ers	41	41	.500	15	26–15	15–26	9–7
New Jersey Nets	24	58	.293	32	19–22	5–36	3–13
Toronto Raptors	22	60	.268	34	16–25	6–35	5–11

#	Eastern Conference				
#	Team	W	L	PCT	GB
1	z-Chicago Bulls	62	20	.756	–
2	y-Miami Heat	58	24	.707	4
3	y-Boston Celtics	56	26	.683	6
4	x-Orlando Magic	52	30	.634	10
5	x-Atlanta Hawks	44	38	.537	18
6	x-New York Knicks	42	40	.512	20
7	x-Philadelphia 76ers	41	41	.500	21
8	x-Indiana Pacers	37	45	.451	25
9	Milwaukee Bucks	35	47	.427	27
10	Charlotte Bobcats	34	48	.415	28
11	Detroit Pistons	30	52	.366	32
12	New Jersey Nets	24	58	.293	38
13	Washington Wizards	23	59	.280	39
14	Toronto Raptors	22	60	.268	40
15	Cleveland Cavaliers	19	63	.232	43

=== Game log ===
2010–11 game log
Total: 41–41 (home: 26–15; road: 15–26)
October: 0–3 (home: 0–2; road: 0–1)

Game	Date	Team	Score	High points	High rebounds	High assists	Location Attendance	Record
1	October 27	Miami	L 87–97	Evan Turner (16)	Elton Brand (9)	Louis Williams (7)	Wells Fargo Center; 20,389	0–1
2	October 29	Atlanta	L 101–104	Andre Iguodala (27)	Elton Brand (8)	Andre Iguodala (10)	Wells Fargo Center; 10,960	0–2
3	October 30	@ Indiana	L 86–99	Louis Williams (18)	Elton Brand (10)	Andre Iguodala, Evan Turner (3)	Conseco Fieldhouse; 18,165	0–3

November: 5–10 (home: 4–2; road: 1–8)

Game	Date	Team	Score	High points	High rebounds	High assists	Location Attendance	Record
4	November 2	@ Washington	L 115–116 (OT)	Louis Williams (30)	Elton Brand (9)	Jrue Holiday (13)	Verizon Center; 17,803	0–4
5	November 3	Indiana	W 101–75	Elton Brand (25)	Elton Brand (12)	Jrue Holiday (5)	Wells Fargo Center; 12,277	1–4
6	November 5	Cleveland	L 116–123	Jrue Holiday (29)	Tony Battie (7)	Jrue Holiday (8)	Wells Fargo Center; 10,589	1–5
7	November 7	@ New York	W 106–96	Elton Brand (20)	Evan Turner (10)	Jrue Holiday (8)	Madison Square Garden; 18,735	2–5
8	November 10	@ Oklahoma City	L 103–109	Elton Brand, Jrue Holiday, Jodie Meeks (17)	Elton Brand (9)	Jrue Holiday (11)	Oklahoma City Arena; 18,203	2–6
9	November 12	@ Dallas	L 90–99	Thaddeus Young (17)	Elton Brand (9)	Jrue Holiday (13)	American Airlines Center; 19,989	2–7
10	November 13	@ San Antonio	L 93–116	Jrue Holiday (16)	Andre Iguodala (8)	Jrue Holiday (5)	AT&T Center; 17,627	2–8
11	November 16	@ Cleveland	L 93–101	Thaddeus Young (17)	Elton Brand (11)	Jrue Holiday (10)	Quicken Loans Arena; 20,562	2–9
12	November 17	Toronto	L 86–94	Elton Brand (27)	Evan Turner (12)	Jrue Holiday (7)	Wells Fargo Center; 12,164	2–10
13	November 19	Milwaukee	W 90–79	Thaddeus Young (23)	Marreese Speights (10)	Evan Turner (6)	Wells Fargo Center; 14,557	3–10
14	November 23	@ Washington	L 114–116 (OT)	Andre Iguodala (23)	Andre Iguodala (11)	Andre Iguodala (8)	Verizon Center; 16,197	3–11
15	November 24	@ Toronto	L 90–106	Andre Iguodala (17)	Andre Iguodala (8)	Andre Iguodala, Jrue Holiday (6)	Air Canada Centre; 15,012	3–12
16	November 26	@ Miami	L 90–99	Jodie Meeks (21)	Andre Iguodala (9)	Jrue Holiday (6)	American Airlines Arena; 19,800	3–13
17	November 27	New Jersey	W 102–86	Jrue Holiday (20)	Elton Brand (10)	Jrue Holiday (13)	Wells Fargo Center; 14,150	4–13
18	November 30	Portland	W 88–79	Elton Brand (18)	Andre Iguodala, Thaddeus Young (7)	Louis Williams (5)	Wells Fargo Center; 13,556	5–13

December: 8–7 (home: 4–2; road: 4–5)

Game	Date	Team	Score	High points	High rebounds	High assists	Location Attendance	Record
19	December 3	@ Atlanta	L 88–93	Elton Brand (16)	Elton Brand (14)	Andre Iguodala (8)	Philips Arena; 12,140	5–14
20	December 4	Charlotte	W 109–91	Jodie Meeks (26)	Elton Brand (10)	Jrue Holiday, Andre Iguodala (7)	Wells Fargo Center; 14,611	6–14
21	December 7	Cleveland	W 117–97	Thaddeus Young (26)	Spencer Hawes (12)	Jrue Holiday, Andre Iguodala (7)	Wells Fargo Center; 10,662	7–14
22	December 9	Boston	L 101–102	Jodie Meeks (19)	Elton Brand (14)	Andre Iguodala (11)	Wells Fargo Center; 17,948	7–15
23	December 12	New Orleans	W 88–70	Louis Williams (17)	Elton Brand (13)	Andre Iguodala, Louis Williams (5)	Wells Fargo Center; 13,884	8–15
24	December 14	@ New Jersey	W 82–77	Jrue Holiday (19)	Evan Turner (6)	Jrue Holiday (5)	Prudential Center; 10,151	9–15
25	December 15	L.A. Clippers	W 105–91	Jrue Holiday (24)	Spencer Hawes (12)	Jrue Holiday, Andre Iguodala (5)	Wells Fargo Center; 11,775	10–15
26	December 17	L.A. Lakers	L 81–93	Spencer Hawes, Andre Iguodala (18)	Spencer Hawes (13)	Jrue Holiday, Andre Iguodala (6)	Wells Fargo Center; 20,366	10–16
27	December 18	@ Orlando	W 97–89	Louis Williams (24)	Elton Brand (13)	Andre Iguodala (7)	Amway Center; 18,846	11–16
28	December 21	@ Chicago	L 76–121	Andre Iguodala (17)	Elton Brand (9)	Louis Williams (4)	United Center; 21,521	11–17
29	December 22	@ Boston	L 80–84	Elton Brand (16)	Elton Brand (12)	Jrue Holiday (5)	TD Garden; 18,624	11–18
30	December 26	@ Denver	W 95–89	Jrue Holiday (22)	Elton Brand (17)	Andre Iguodala (5)	Pepsi Center; 19,155	12–18
31	December 27	@ Golden State	L 95–110	Jrue Holiday (23)	Elton Brand (16)	Jrue Holiday (11)	Oracle Arena; 19,208	12–19
32	December 29	@ Phoenix	W 123–110	Jrue Holiday (25)	Andrés Nocioni (12)	Jrue Holiday (7)	US Airways Center; 18,422	13–19
33	December 31	@ L.A. Lakers	L 98–102	Jrue Holiday (19)	Andrés Nocioni (8)	Jrue Holiday (11)	Staples Center; 18,997	13–20

January: 8–6 (home: 7–2; road: 1–4)

Game	Date	Team	Score	High points	High rebounds	High assists	Location Attendance	Record
34	January 3	@ New Orleans	L 77–84	Elton Brand (14)	Elton Brand (10)	Jrue Holiday (6)	New Orleans Arena; 13,433	13–21
35	January 5	Washington	W 109–97	Jrue Holiday, Louis Williams (26)	Andrés Nocioni (10)	Jrue Holiday (9)	Wells Fargo Center; 12,434	14–21
36	January 7	Chicago	W 105–99	Jodie Meeks (24)	Elton Brand, Spencer Hawes (8)	Jrue Holiday (6)	Wells Fargo Center; 15,303	15–21
37	January 8	@ Detroit	L 109–112 (OT)	Evan Turner (19)	Elton Brand (14)	Jrue Holiday (12)	The Palace of Auburn Hills; 20,038	15–22
38	January 11	Indiana	L 103–111	Jrue Holiday (19)	Marreese Speights (9)	Jrue Holiday (8)	Wells Fargo Center; 10,890	15–23
39	January 14	Milwaukee	W 95–94	Louis Williams (25)	Andre Iguodala (6)	Andre Iguodala (7)	Wells Fargo Center; 12,650	16–23
40	January 17	Charlotte	W 96–92 (OT)	Louis Williams (23)	Elton Brand (13)	Jrue Holiday, Andre Iguodala (6)	Wells Fargo Center; 13,508	17–23
41	January 19	@ Orlando	L 98–99 (OT)	Louis Williams (19)	Jrue Holiday, Evan Turner (8)	Jrue Holiday, Andre Iguodala (6)	Amway Center; 18,846	17–24
42	January 20	@ Charlotte	L 97–100	Thaddeus Young (21)	Elton Brand (10)	Jrue Holiday (7)	Time Warner Cable Arena; 14,326	17–25
43	January 22	Utah	W 96–85	Andre Iguodala (22)	Spencer Hawes (11)	Andre Iguodala (5)	Wells Fargo Center; 14,036	18–25
44	January 24	Phoenix	W 105–95	Thaddeus Young (24)	Elton Brand (9)	Jrue Holiday (8)	Wells Fargo Center; 14,881	19–25
45	January 26	@ Toronto	W 107–94	Marreese Speights (23)	Marreese Speights (9)	Jrue Holiday (11)	Air Canada Centre; 14,552	20–25
46	January 28	Memphis	L 94–99	Jrue Holiday, Jodie Meeks (16)	Elton Brand (9)	Andre Iguodala (9)	Wells Fargo Center; 14,289	20–26
47	January 30	Denver	W 110–99	Andre Iguodala (24)	Evan Turner (8)	Jrue Holiday, Andre Iguodala (7)	Wells Fargo Center; 15,612	21–26

February: 9–3 (home: 4–1; road: 5–2)

Game	Date	Team	Score	High points	High rebounds	High assists	Location Attendance	Record
48	February 2	@ New Jersey	W 106–92	Louis Williams (26)	Spencer Hawes (12)	Jrue Holiday (11)	Prudential Center; 10,057	22–26
49	February 4	New York	W 100–98	Elton Brand (33)	Elton Brand (16)	Andre Iguodala (16)	Wells Fargo Center; 18,823	23–26
50	February 6	@ New York	L 103–117	Elton Brand (28)	Elton Brand, Spencer Hawes, Andre Iguodala, Thaddeus Young (5)	Andre Iguodala (8)	Madison Square Garden; 19,763	23–27
51	February 8	@ Atlanta	W 117–83	Louis Williams (20)	Jodie Meeks, Evan Turner, Thaddeus Young (8)	Andre Iguodala (8)	Philips Arena; 12,903	24–27
52	February 9	Orlando	L 95–99	Louis Williams (23)	Spencer Hawes (10)	Andre Iguodala (8)	Wells Fargo Center; 12,091	24–28
53	February 11	San Antonio	W 77–71	Jrue Holiday (27)	Elton Brand (17)	Andre Iguodala (6)	Wells Fargo Center; 15,501	25–28
54	February 12	@ Minnesota	W 107–87	Thaddeus Young (18)	Elton Brand (9)	Andre Iguodala (7)	Target Center; 17,011	26–28
55	February 15	@ Memphis	L 91–102	Thaddeus Young (23)	Elton Brand, Spencer Hawes (8)	Jrue Holiday (5)	FedExForum; 11,197	26–29
56	February 16	@ Houston	W 114–105	Jrue Holiday (20)	Andre Iguodala (12)	Andre Iguodala (10)	Toyota Center; 14,476	27–29
All-Star Break
57	February 23	Washington	W 117–94	Jrue Holiday (20)	Thaddeus Young (10)	Louis Williams (7)	Wells Fargo Center; 12,704	28–29
58	February 25	Detroit	W 110–94	Thaddeus Young (24)	Elton Brand (17)	Andre Iguodala (11)	Wells Fargo Center; 15,105	29–29
59	February 27	@ Cleveland	W 95–91	Elton Brand, Louis Williams (16)	Elton Brand (8)	Jrue Holiday (9)	Quicken Loans Arena; 19,882	30–29

March: 9–7 (home: 5–3; road: 4–4)

Game	Date	Team	Score	High points	High rebounds	High assists	Location Attendance	Record
60	March 1	Dallas	L 93–101	Jodie Meeks (16)	Jrue Holiday, Andre Iguodala, Thaddeus Young (7)	Jrue Holiday (6)	Wells Fargo Center; 13,509	30–30
61	March 4	Minnesota	W 111–100	Andre Iguodala (22)	Andre Iguodala (10)	Andre Iguodala (13)	Wells Fargo Center; 12,008	31–30
62	March 6	Golden State	W 125–117 (OT)	Evan Turner, Thaddeus Young (20)	Andre Iguodala (11)	Andre Iguodala (10)	Wells Fargo Center; 11,294	32–30
63	March 8	@ Indiana	W 110–100	Thaddeus Young (18)	Thaddeus Young (9)	Andre Iguodala (10)	Conseco Fieldhouse; 9,466	33–30
64	March 9	Oklahoma City	L 105–110 (OT)	Jrue Holiday, Louis Williams (22)	Elton Brand (15)	Jrue Holiday, Andre Iguodala (8)	Wells Fargo Center; 19,283	33–31
65	March 11	Boston	W 89–86	Elton Brand, Spencer Hawes (14)	Spencer Hawes (10)	Andre Iguodala (8)	Wells Fargo Center; 20,614	34–31
66	March 12	@ Milwaukee	L 74–102	Louis Williams (16)	Spencer Hawes (7)	Andre Iguodala (5)	Bradley Center; 15,832	34–32
67	March 14	@ Utah	L 107–112 (OT)	Andre Iguodala (23)	Spencer Hawes (10)	Andre Iguodala (6)	EnergySolutions Arena; 19,632	34–33
68	March 16	@ L.A. Clippers	W 104–94	Jodie Meeks (22)	Elton Brand (12)	Jrue Holiday (9)	Staples Center; 19,060	35–33
69	March 18	@ Sacramento	W 102–80	Jrue Holiday (15)	Thaddeus Young (10)	Andre Iguodala (9)	Power Balance Pavilion; 15,373	36–33
70	March 19	@ Portland	L 101–110	Louis Williams (24)	Elton Brand (9)	Jrue Holiday (10)	Rose Garden; 20,637	36–34
71	March 23	Atlanta	W 105–100	Louis Williams (17)	Elton Brand (11)	Jrue Holiday (5)	Wells Fargo Center; 15,199	37–34
72	March 25	@ Miami	L 99–111	Louis Williams (24)	Elton Brand, Thaddeus Young (8)	Jrue Holiday (6)	American Airlines Arena; 19,840	37–35
73	March 27	Sacramento	L 111–114 (OT)	Jrue Holiday (28)	Elton Brand (15)	Jrue Holiday (7)	Wells Fargo Center; 16,235	37–36
74	March 28	@ Chicago	W 97–85	Thaddeus Young (21)	Elton Brand (9)	Andre Iguodala, Louis Williams (7)	United Center; 22,210	38–36
75	March 30	Houston	W 108–97	Jrue Holiday (24)	Thaddeus Young (9)	Jrue Holiday (12)	Wells Fargo Center; 16,635	39–36

April: 2–5 (home: 2–3; road: 0–2)

Game	Date	Team	Score	High points	High rebounds	High assists	Location Attendance	Record
76	April 1	New Jersey	W 115–90	Thaddeus Young (22)	Spencer Hawes (9)	Jrue Holiday, Andre Iguodala (7)	Wells Fargo Center; 16,695	40–36
77	April 2	@ Milwaukee	L 87–93	Elton Brand (20)	Elton Brand (12)	Jrue Holiday (10)	Bradley Center; 17,079	40–37
78	April 5	@ Boston	L 82–99	Evan Turner (21)	Spencer Hawes (8)	Evan Turner (5)	TD Garden; 18,624	40–38
79	April 6	New York	L 92–97	Thaddeus Young (25)	Elton Brand (9)	Jrue Holiday (8)	Wells Fargo Center; 18,375	40–39
80	April 8	Toronto	W 98–93	Elton Brand (22)	Elton Brand (8)	Jrue Holiday (11)	Wells Fargo Center; 16,362	41–39
81	April 11	Orlando	L 85–95	Elton Brand (22)	Andrés Nocioni (6)	Jrue Holiday (11)	Wells Fargo Center; 19,139	41–40
82	April 13	Detroit	L 100–104	Jrue Holiday (21)	Elton Brand (8)	Jrue Holiday, Evan Turner (7)	Wells Fargo Center; 13,760	41–41

2010–11 season schedule

== Playoffs ==
=== Game log ===
2011 playoff game log
First Round: 1–4 (home: 1–1; road: 0–3)

Game	Date	Team	Score	High points	High rebounds	High assists	Location Attendance	Series
1	April 16	@ Miami	L 89–97	Thaddeus Young (20)	Thaddeus Young (11)	Andre Iguodala (9)	American Airlines Arena; 19,600	0–1
2	April 18	@ Miami	L 73–94	Thaddeus Young (18)	Elton Brand, Andre Iguodala (7)	Andre Iguodala (7)	American Airlines Arena; 20,204	0–2
3	April 21	Miami	L 94–100	Elton Brand (21)	Elton Brand (10)	Andre Iguodala (10)	Wells Fargo Center; 20,404	0–3
4	April 24	Miami	W 86–82	Evan Turner, Louis Williams (17)	Elton Brand (11)	Jrue Holiday (5)	Wells Fargo Center; 19,048	1–3
5	April 27	@ Miami	L 91–97	Elton Brand, Andre Iguodala (22)	Andre Iguodala, Evan Turner (10)	Jrue Holiday (8)	American Airlines Arena; 19,896	1–4

2011 playoff schedule

== Player statistics ==
Legend
GP	Games played	GS	Games started	MPG	Minutes per game
FG%	Field-goal percentage	3P%	3-point field-goal percentage	FT%	Free-throw percentage
RPG	Rebounds per game	APG	Assists per game	SPG	Steals per game
BPG	Blocks per game	PPG	Points per game

=== Season ===
Player	GP	GS	MPG	FG%	3P%	FT%	RPG	APG	SPG	BPG	PPG
Tony Battie	30	0	10.1	.474	.667	.500	2.4	0.3	.17	.43	2.7
Craig Brackins	2	0	10.5	.364	.000	.0	1.5	0.0	.50	.0	4.0
Elton Brand	61	61	34.5	.521	.000	.784	8.6	1.4	1.13	1.11	15.3
Spencer Hawes	61	61	19.7	.487	.280	.469	5.6	1.4	.26	.85	6.7
Jrue Holiday	62	62	35.1	.444	.365	.792	4.0	6.5	1.50	.39	13.8
Andre Iguodala	50	50	37.1	.446	.321	.712	6.1	6.3	1.58	.56	14.3
Jason Kapono	18	2	4.9	.273	.250	.500	0.4	0.1	.11	.06	0.8
Jodie Meeks	54	44	25.3	.406	.404	.903	1.8	1.0	.69	.06	9.7
Andrés Nocioni	40	16	18.6	.425	.337	.804	3.5	0.9	.33	.33	6.5
Darius Songaila	10	0	7.1	.467	.0	.500	1.0	0.2	.0	.0	1.6
Marreese Speights	51	1	12.0	.513	.250	.754	3.5	0.5	.12	.27	5.6
Evan Turner	60	12	24.3	.428	.256	.804	4.3	2.1	.63	.18	7.5
Louis Williams	60	0	23.5	.401	.342	.833	1.9	3.3	.55	.28	13.6
Thaddeus Young	62	1	26.2	.554	.222	.717	5.2	1.1	1.08	.32	12.6

=== Playoffs ===
Player	GP	GS	MPG	FG%	3P%	FT%	RPG	APG	SPG	BPG	PPG
Tony Battie	5	0	7.6	.429		.500	2.0	.0	.0	.6	1.4
Elton Brand	5	5	37.0	.548		.769	8.4	.6	.4	1.2	15.6
Spencer Hawes	5	5	19.6	.364	.000	.500	3.8	1.8	.0	.4	5.2
Jrue Holiday	5	5	37.6	.414	.524	.800	3.8	5.6	2.0	.4	14.2
Andre Iguodala	5	5	36.4	.423	.214	.714	7.0	6.8	1.0	.4	11.4
Jodie Meeks	5	5	25.0	.419	.444	.833	2.0	.8	.6	.0	7.8
Andrés Nocioni	1	0	10.0	.000	.000		2.0	.0	.0	.0	.0
Marreese Speights	2	0	10.5	.167			3.0	.5	.0	.5	2.0
Evan Turner	5	0	19.4	.447	.800	1.000	4.6	.8	.6	.2	8.0
Lou Williams	5	0	26.0	.327	.300	.737	1.6	3.0	1.0	.0	10.8
Thaddeus Young	5	0	25.4	.417	.000	.583	5.8	.8	.8	.2	11.4

== Awards and records ==
=== Awards ===
- Andre Iguodala, NBA All-Defensive Second Team

== Transactions ==
=== Trades ===
June 17, 2010
To Philadelphia 76ers

- (Argentina) Andrés Nocioni,
  (United States) Spencer Hawes
To Sacramento Kings

- (Canada) Samuel Dalembert

=== Free agents ===
==== Additions ====
Player	Signed	Former Team
Tony Battie		New Jersey Nets

==== Subtractions ====
Player	Reason Left	New Team
Allen Iverson	Free agent	Beşiktaş Cola Turka
