= Thaddeus Young =

American basketball player (born 1988)

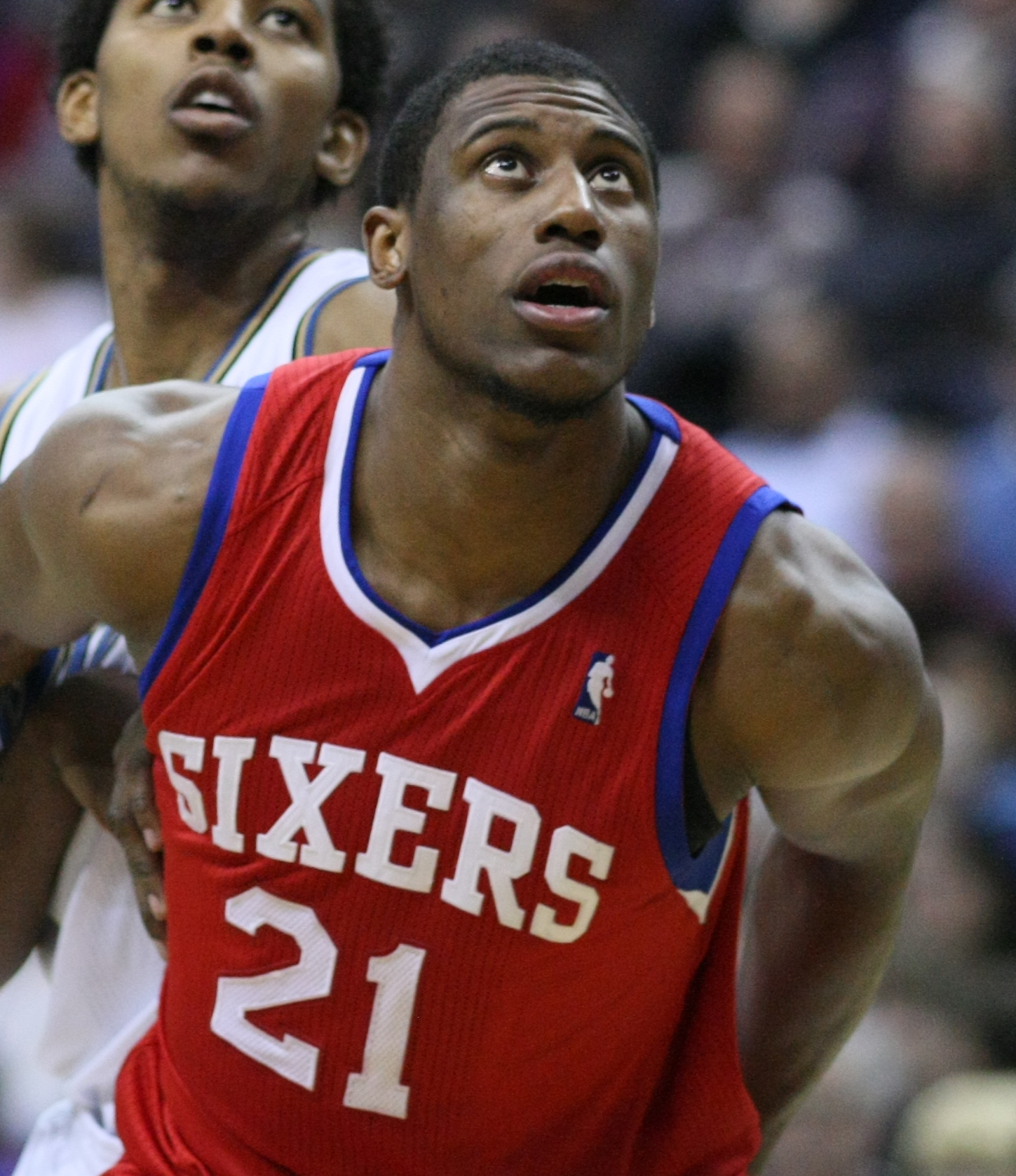
- Young with the Philadelphia 76ers in 2010

Personal information
- Born: June 21, 1988 (age 38) New Orleans, Louisiana, U.S.
- Listed height: 6 ft 8 in (2.03 m)
- Listed weight: 225 lb (102 kg)

Career information
- High school: Mitchell (Memphis, Tennessee)
- College: Georgia Tech (2006–2007)
- NBA draft: 2007: 1st round, 12th overall pick
- Drafted by: Philadelphia 76ers
- Playing career: 2007–2024
- Position: Power forward
- Number: 21, 33, 30

Career history
- 2007–2014: Philadelphia 76ers
- 2014–2015: Minnesota Timberwolves
- 2015–2016: Brooklyn Nets
- 2016–2019: Indiana Pacers
- 2019–2021: Chicago Bulls
- 2021–2022: San Antonio Spurs
- 2022–2024: Toronto Raptors
- 2024: Phoenix Suns

Career highlights
- NBA All-Rookie Second Team (2008); Second-team Parade All-American (2006); McDonald's All-American (2006); Class AA Tennessee Mr. Basketball (2005)
- Stats at NBA.com
- Stats at Basketball Reference

Thaddeus Charles Young Sr. (born June 21, 1988) is an American former professional basketball player, who played for 17 seasons in the National Basketball Association (NBA). He played college basketball for the Georgia Tech Yellow Jackets, before being selected 12th overall in the 2007 NBA draft by the Philadelphia 76ers. In 2018, Young became the 5th player in NBA history with at least 800 games to average 13.5 points, 5.9 Rebounds, 1.4 steals, 49% FGS, and 30% 3PT FGS, after Larry Bird, Magic Johnson, Michael Jordan, and LeBron James.

== Early life ==
Young was born to Lula Hall and Felton Young in New Orleans, Louisiana. His family moved to Memphis, Tennessee when Young was in fourth grade. His father played basketball for Jacksonville University from 1976 to 1978, and was selected by the Buffalo Braves in the 8th round of the 1978 NBA draft.

=== High school career ===
Young began playing varsity basketball in the eighth grade, and while attending Mitchell High School, he rose to the top of the high school player ranks. His athletic honors included being named to the all-state team three times, being named the TSSAA Class AA "Mr. Basketball" in 2005, being named the 2006 Tennessee Gatorade Player of the Year and being named to the McDonald's All-American Game. In 2006, he led Mitchell's basketball team to the TSSAA Class AA finals against Liberty Technology Magnet High School. As a senior, he averaged 26.9 points, 13.8 rebounds, 4.1 assists, 4.3 steals and 3.6 blocks per game. He was an excellent overall athlete at Mitchell who also excelled in cross country in his junior year. Young was an exceptional student at Mitchell who graduated with a 4.3 GPA. Coming out of high school Young was one of the most prized recruits of the 2006 freshman class.

== College career ==
Young was the youngest member of Georgia Tech's 2006 freshman class. Young finished his freshman season with averages of 14.4 points, 4.9 rebounds, and 2.2 assists. He shot a solid 47.8% from the field and an above average 41.9% from the three-point line.

== Professional career ==
=== Philadelphia 76ers (2007–2014) ===
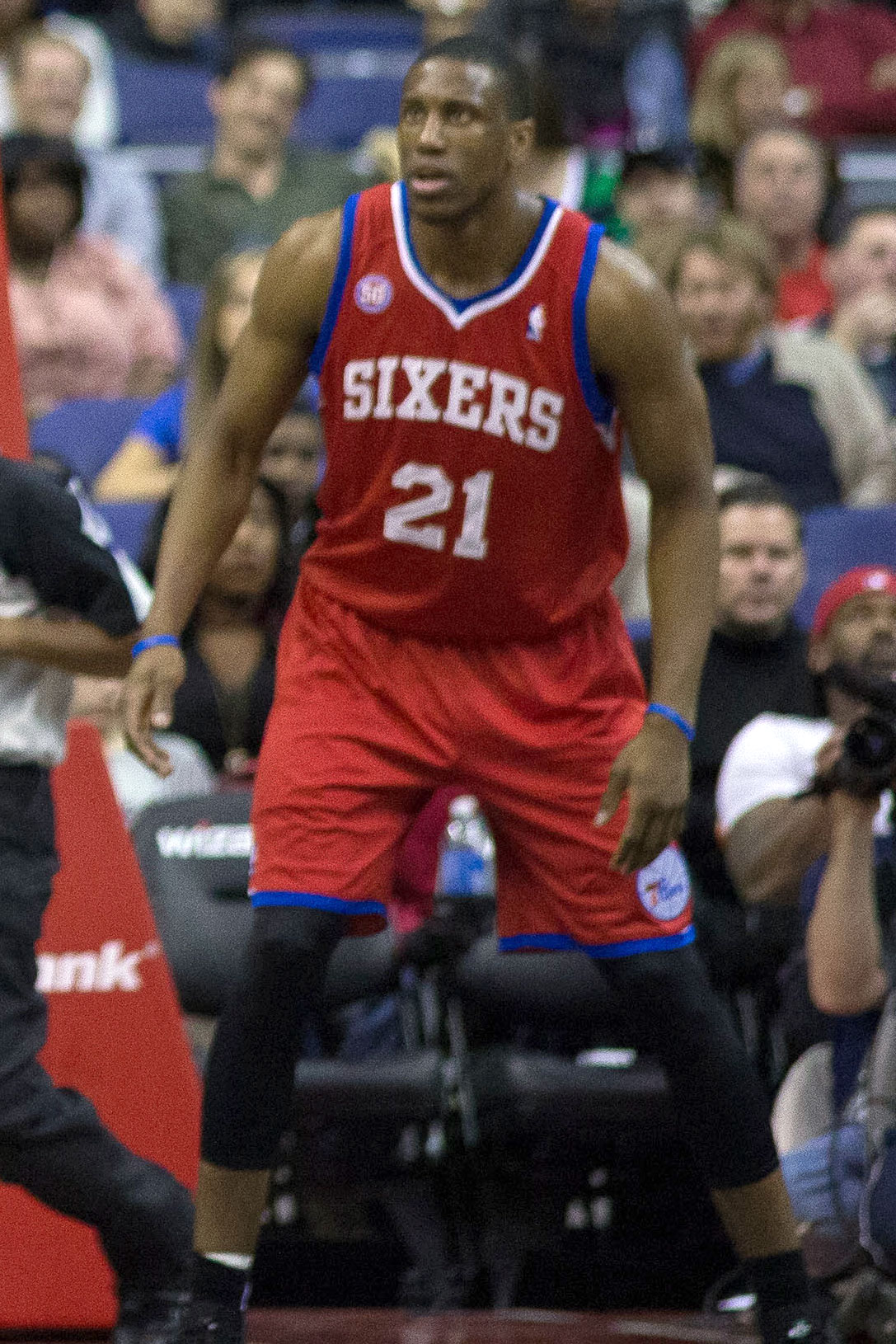
Young with the 76ers in March 2013

On June 28, 2007, Young was drafted by the Philadelphia 76ers with the 12th overall pick in the 2007 NBA draft.

In his NBA debut on November 7, 2007, Young made his first NBA field goal at the Wachovia Center in Philadelphia in a 94–63 76ers' win over the Charlotte Bobcats. Young finished the night with 6 points and 3 rebounds.

Until general manager Ed Stefanski was hired, Young did not play very often. After the trade of Kyle Korver, Young played more minutes and alternated with Reggie Evans in the starting lineup. Young averaged 8.2 points, 4.2 rebounds, and 21 minutes per game during 2007–08. His season high in points was 22 against the Milwaukee Bucks on March 9, 2008. He played a total of 74 games, starting 22.

On February 5, 2009, Young was selected to play in the 2009 Rookie Challenge as a member of the Sophomore team.

In game 3 of the 76ers' 2009 opening round playoff series against the Orlando Magic, Young made a game-winning shot with 2 seconds remaining to give Philadelphia a 2 games to 1 lead.

On March 7, 2010, Young recorded a career high 32 points in a 114–101 win over the Toronto Raptors.

On February 21, 2014, Young set a career high with 29 field goal attempts, going on to record 30 points, 13 rebounds, 6 assists and 7 steals in a 112–124 loss to the Dallas Mavericks.

Young finished the 2013–14 NBA season with career highs in points, steals, assists, three-pointers made, and games started. He also finished the season third in the league in steals.

=== Minnesota Timberwolves (2014–2015) ===
On August 23, 2014, a three-team trade was completed involving the 76ers, the Minnesota Timberwolves, and the Cleveland Cavaliers. As part of the deal, Young was traded to the Wolves, along with Andrew Wiggins and Anthony Bennett, both then of the Cavaliers. The Cavaliers received Kevin Love from Minnesota, whereas the 76ers received Luc Mbah a Moute and Alexey Shved from Minnesota and a 2015 first round draft pick from Cleveland.

=== Brooklyn Nets (2015–2016) ===
On February 19, 2015, Young was traded to the Brooklyn Nets in exchange for Kevin Garnett. On June 22, 2015, Young opted out of his contract with the Nets to become a free agent. On July 9, 2015, he re-signed with the Nets. On February 3, 2016, he recorded 16 points and 14 rebounds against the Indiana Pacers, setting a new single-season career high with his 22nd double-double.

=== Indiana Pacers (2016–2019) ===
On July 7, 2016, Young was traded to the Indiana Pacers in exchange for the draft rights to Caris LeVert. On November 23, 2016, he scored a season-high 24 points against the Atlanta Hawks. On December 10, 2016, he scored 24 points and hit a career-high six 3-pointers in a 118–111 win over the Portland Trail Blazers.

On November 1, 2017, Young scored a season-high 26 points against the Cleveland Cavaliers.

On March 1, 2018, Fox Sports used a TV graphic to compare Young to NBA all-time greats Magic Johnson, Larry Bird, Michael Jordan, and LeBron James. The graphic later became a prominent example of statistical cherry-picking and was ridiculed by fans and media.

On December 17, 2018, Young was named Eastern Conference Player of the Week for Week 9 of the 2018–19 season, marking his second career Eastern Conference Player of the Week award and his first honor since January 2014 when he was a member of the Philadelphia 76ers.

On January 17, 2019, Young scored a season-high 27 points in a 120–96 loss to the Philadelphia 76ers.

=== Chicago Bulls (2019–2021) ===
On July 6, 2019, Young signed with the Chicago Bulls as a free agent. Following his first season with the Bulls, Young improved during his second season, with 12.1 points, 6.2 rebounds, 4.3 rebounds, and 55.9% shooting. Eventually, the power forward inserted himself as a starter for the Bulls. He was the winner of the NBA Hustle Award that season.

=== San Antonio Spurs (2021–2022) ===
On August 11, 2021, Young, Al-Farouq Aminu, and several draft picks were traded to the San Antonio Spurs in exchange for DeMar DeRozan.

=== Toronto Raptors (2022–2024) ===
On February 10, 2022, Young, Drew Eubanks, and a 2022 second round selection were traded to the Toronto Raptors in exchange for Goran Dragić and a 2022 first-round draft selection. On June 30, Young signed a two-year, $16 million contract extension with the Raptors.

On February 8, 2024, Young was traded alongside Dennis Schröder to the Brooklyn Nets in exchange for Spencer Dinwiddie, but was waived that day.

=== Phoenix Suns (2024) ===
On February 20, 2024, Young signed with the Phoenix Suns.

== Career statistics ==
Legend
GP	Games played	GS	Games started	MPG	Minutes per game
FG%	Field goal percentage	3P%	3-point field goal percentage	FT%	Free throw percentage
RPG	Rebounds per game	APG	Assists per game	SPG	Steals per game
BPG	Blocks per game	PPG	Points per game	**Bold**	Career high

=== NBA ===
==== Regular season ====
Year	Team	GP	GS	MPG	FG%	3P%	FT%	RPG	APG	SPG	BPG	PPG
2007–08	Philadelphia	74	22	21.0	.539	.316	.738	4.2	.8	1.0	.1	8.2
2008–09	Philadelphia	75	71	34.4	.495	.341	.735	5.0	1.1	1.3	.3	15.3
2009–10	Philadelphia	67	45	32.0	.470	.348	.691	5.2	1.4	1.2	.2	13.8
2010–11	Philadelphia	**82**	1	26.0	.541	.273	.707	5.3	1.0	1.1	.3	12.7
2011–12	Philadelphia	63	1	27.9	.507	.250	**.771**	5.2	1.2	1.0	**.7**	12.8
2012–13	Philadelphia	76	76	**34.6**	.531	.125	.574	7.5	1.6	1.8	**.7**	14.8
2013–14	Philadelphia	79	78	34.4	.454	.308	.712	6.0	2.3	**2.1**	.5	**17.9**
2014–15	Minnesota	48	48	33.4	.451	.292	.682	5.1	2.8	1.8	.4	14.3
2014–15	Brooklyn	28	20	29.6	.495	.380	.606	5.9	1.4	1.4	.3	13.8
2015–16	Brooklyn	73	73	33.0	.514	.233	.644	**9.0**	1.8	1.5	.5	15.1
2016–17	Indiana	74	74	30.2	.527	.381	.523	6.1	1.6	1.5	.4	11.0
2017–18	Indiana	81	**81**	32.2	.487	.320	.598	6.3	1.9	1.7	.4	11.8
2018–19	Indiana	81	**81**	30.7	.527	.349	.644	6.5	2.5	1.5	.4	12.6
2019–20	Chicago	64	16	24.9	.448	.356	.583	4.9	1.8	1.4	.4	10.3
2020–21	Chicago	68	23	24.3	.559	.267	.628	6.2	**4.3**	1.1	.6	12.1
2021–22	San Antonio	26	1	14.2	.578	.000	.455	3.6	2.3	.9	.3	6.1
2021–22	Toronto	26	0	18.3	.465	**.395**	.481	4.4	1.7	1.2	.4	6.3
2022–23	Toronto	54	9	14.7	.545	.176	.692	3.1	1.4	1.0	.1	4.4
2023–24	Toronto	23	6	15.2	**.621**	.167	.417	3.3	2.2	.8	.1	5.0
2023–24	Phoenix	10	0	8.9	.524	.000	.333	2.8	.7	.5	.2	2.3
Career		1,172	726	28.2	.503	.328	.661	5.6	1.8	1.4	.4	12.1

==== Playoffs ====
Year	Team	GP	GS	MPG	FG%	3P%	FT%	RPG	APG	SPG	BPG	PPG
2008	Philadelphia	6	6	26.7	.480	.200	**.857**	4.5	.7	1.2	.0	10.2
2009	Philadelphia	6	6	**38.2**	.449	**.417**	.833	4.5	1.3	1.0	.2	**12.0**
2011	Philadelphia	5	0	25.4	.417	.000	.583	5.8	.8	.8	.2	11.4
2012	Philadelphia	**13**	0	21.3	.429	—	.710	5.2	1.2	.5	.5	7.7
2015	Brooklyn	6	6	31.7	.439	.000	.417	7.2	2.7	.8	.2	10.5
2017	Indiana	4	4	35.0	.538	.250	.500	**9.0**	2.5	2.0	.3	**12.0**
2018	Indiana	7	**7**	33.8	**.600**	.286	.385	7.7	1.4	1.7	**.9**	11.3
2019	Indiana	4	4	32.6	.429	.250	.571	7.0	**3.8**	**2.8**	.8	10.5
2022	Toronto	6	0	14.5	.500	.143	.250	3.0	1.7	.8	.2	3.3
2024	Phoenix	1	0	3.6	—	—	—	.0	.0	.0	.0	.0
Career		58	33	27.3	.468	.250	.606	5.7	1.6	1.1	.4	9.3

=== College ===
Year	Team	GP	GS	MPG	FG%	3P%	FT%	RPG	APG	SPG	BPG	PPG
2006–07	Georgia Tech	31	31	29.6	.478	.419	.749	4.9	2.0	1.3	.4	14.4

== Personal life ==
Young and his wife, Shekinah Beckett, have two sons named Thaddeus Jr. and Taylor.

In May 2011, Young started a foundation called Young for Youth to help at-risk youth and young families.

Young's mother, Lula Hall, died on November 13, 2014, after an 18-month battle with breast cancer; she was 57 years old.

== See also ==
- List of National Basketball Association career steals leaders
- 2006 high school boys basketball All-Americans
- 2006–07 Georgia Tech Yellow Jackets men's basketball team
