= 1999 NCAA Men's Basketball All-Americans =

- Awarded for: 1998–99 NCAA Division I men's basketball season

The Consensus 1999 College Basketball All-American team, as determined by aggregating the results of four major All-American teams. To earn "consensus" status, a player must win honors from a majority of the following teams: the Associated Press, the USBWA, The Sporting News and the National Association of Basketball Coaches.

== 1999 Consensus All-America team ==
Consensus First Team
Player	Position	Class	Team
Elton Brand	C	Sophomore	Duke
Mateen Cleaves	G	Junior	Michigan State
Richard Hamilton	F-G	Junior	Connecticut
Andre Miller	G	Senior	Utah
Jason Terry	G	Senior	Arizona

Consensus Second Team
Player	Position	Class	Team
Evan Eschmeyer	C	Senior	Northwestern
Steve Francis	G	Junior	Maryland
Trajan Langdon	G	Senior	Duke
Chris Porter	F	Junior	Auburn
Wally Szczerbiak	F	Senior	Miami (OH)

== Individual All-America teams ==
All-America Team
All-America Team	First team		Second team		Third team	
All-America Team	Player	School	Player	School	Player	School
Associated Press	Elton Brand	Duke	Evan Eschmeyer	Northwestern	Ron Artest	St. John's
Associated Press	Mateen Cleaves	Michigan State	Steve Francis	Maryland	Baron Davis	UCLA
Associated Press	Richard Hamilton	Connecticut	Trajan Langdon	Duke	Tim James	Miami (FL)
Associated Press	Andre Miller	Utah	Chris Porter	Auburn	Quincy Lewis	Minnesota
Associated Press	Jason Terry	Arizona	Wally Szczerbiak	Miami (OH)	Scoonie Penn	Ohio State
USBWA	Elton Brand	Duke	Evan Eschmeyer	Northwestern	No third team	
USBWA	Mateen Cleaves	Michigan State	Steve Francis	Maryland	No third team	
USBWA	Richard Hamilton	Connecticut	Trajan Langdon	Duke	No third team	
USBWA	Andre Miller	Utah	Scoonie Penn	Ohio State	No third team	
USBWA	Jason Terry	Arizona	Chris Porter	Auburn	No third team	
USBWA			Wally Szczerbiak	Miami (OH)	No third team	
NABC	Elton Brand	Duke	Evan Eschmeyer	Northwestern	Ron Artest	St. John's
NABC	Mateen Cleaves	Michigan State	Steve Francis	Maryland	Tim James	Miami (FL)
NABC	Richard Hamilton	Connecticut	Chris Porter	Auburn	Quincy Lewis	Minnesota
NABC	Trajan Langdon	Duke	Wally Szczerbiak	Miami (OH)	Mark Madsen	Stanford
NABC	Andre Miller	Utah	Jason Terry	Arizona	Scoonie Penn	Ohio State
Sporting News	Elton Brand	Duke	Mateen Cleaves	Michigan State	No third team	
Sporting News	Richard Hamilton	Connecticut	Evan Eschmeyer	Northwestern	No third team	
Sporting News	Andre Miller	Utah	Steve Francis	Maryland	No third team	
Sporting News	Wally Szczerbiak	Miami (OH)	Trajan Langdon	Duke	No third team	
Sporting News	Jason Terry	Arizona	Chris Porter	Auburn	No third team	

AP Honorable Mention:

- William Avery, Duke
- Pat Bradley, Arkansas
- Rodney Buford, Creighton
- Keith Carter, Mississippi
- Eric Chenowith, Kansas
- Ed Cota, North Carolina
- Khalid El-Amin, Connecticut
- Chico Fletcher, Arkansas State
- A. J. Guyton, Indiana
- Venson Hamilton, Nebraska
- Jumaine Jones, Georgia
- Arthur Lee, Stanford
- Melvin Levett, Cincinnati
- Todd MacCulloch, Washington
- Mark Madsen, Stanford
- Kenyon Martin, Cincinnati
- Sean Mason, Wisconsin
- BJ McKie, South Carolina
- Chris Mihm, Texas
- Terence Morris, Maryland
- Lee Nailon, TCU
- Lamar Odom, Rhode Island
- Ademola Okulaja, North Carolina
- Scott Padgett, Kentucky
- Morris Peterson, Michigan State
- James Posey, Xavier
- Laron Profit, Maryland
- Quentin Richardson, DePaul
- Doc Robinson, Auburn
- Shawnta Rogers, George Washington
- Matt Santangelo, Gonzaga
- Kenny Thomas, New Mexico
- Wayne Turner, Kentucky
