= 2008–09 Philadelphia 76ers season =

NBA professional basketball team season

- Head coach: Maurice Cheeks (until December 13, 2008); Tony DiLeo
- Arena: Wachovia Center

Results
- Record: 41–41 (.500)
- Place: Division: 2nd (Atlantic); Conference: 6th (Eastern)
- Playoff finish: First Round (lost to Magic 2–4)
- Stats at Basketball Reference

Local media
- Television: CSN Philadelphia (69 games); WPSG (5 games); CN8 (5 games)
- Radio: WIP, WPHT

The 2008–09 Philadelphia 76ers season was the 70th season of the franchise, 60th in the National Basketball Association (NBA). The team finished with a .500 record. Following a 9–14 start, the team fired Maurice Cheeks and replaced him with Director of Player Personnel Tony DiLeo on an interim basis. The team went 32–27 after the change and made the postseason.

Two things memorable about the season is that the team returned to the classic uniform style the team wore in the 1980s, and the Sixers defeated the Chicago Bulls in a game played at The Spectrum, the team's home from 1967 to 1996.

The team signed Elton Brand to a five-year $79 million contract.

== Key dates ==
- June 26: The 2008 NBA draft took place in New York City.
- July 1: The free agency period started.
- July 9: Signed 2-time All-Star PF Elton Brand.
- October 8: The Sixers' preseason started with a game against the Boston Celtics.
- October 29: The Sixers' regular season started with a game against the Toronto Raptors.
- December 13: The Sixers fired head coach Maurice Cheeks after a 9–14 start and appoint Assistant general manager Tony DiLeo as interim head coach.
- March 13: The Sixers played their last game at the Wachovia Spectrum against the Chicago Bulls.
- April 4: The Sixers clinched a playoff berth to the 2009 NBA Playoffs.
- April 30: The Sixers were eliminated from the 2009 NBA Playoffs with their game 6 loss to Orlando Magic finishing the series 4–2.

== Summary ==
=== 2008 NBA draft ===
On June 26, the Sixers selected power forward/center Marreese Speights from Florida with the 16th overall pick. Their second round pick was previously traded to the Utah Jazz on June 7, 2009, for a second round pick in the 2009 NBA draft.

=== Free agency ===
The Sixers headed into the off-season with free agents Louis Amundson, Calvin Booth, Herbert Hill, Andre Iguodala, Kevin Ollie, Shavlik Randolph and Louis Williams.

On June 24, the Sixers extended qualifying offers to key restricted free agents Andre Iguodala and Louis Williams. The Sixers brought in Atlanta Hawks restricted free agent Josh Smith on July 3 for a tour of Philadelphia but left the city without signing an offer sheet.

On July 9 after denouncing their rights to their unrestricted free agents, and trading Rodney Carney and Calvin Booth, along with Utah's 2010 1st-round pick to the Minnesota Timberwolves for a top-55 protected 2010 2nd round pick, the Sixers signed 2-time NBA All-Star Power Forward Elton Brand of the Los Angeles Clippers to a 5-year contract reportedly worth 78–82 Million dollars.

After the Brand signing, the first weeks of July were quiet in terms of free agency. Rumors spread that key restricted free agents Andre Iguodala and Louis Williams were being pursued by the Los Angeles Clippers and Golden State Warriors respectively.

On July 24 it was announced by Philly.com that the Sixers had come to terms with Point Guard Royal Ivey of the Milwaukee Bucks for a 2-year league minimum contract. The deal was finalized and signed on Monday July 28.

Also on July 28, Philly.com released that the Sixers had come to terms with Shooting Guard Kareem Rush of the Indiana Pacers. The deal was finalized and signed on Tuesday July 29.

After news reports stated that Louis Williams rejected a $3.9M deal from the Sixers and he was talking to the Cleveland Cavaliers, he signed a 5-year deal on July 31.

On August 12, ESPN announced that the 76ers had come to terms with restricted free agent Andre Iguodala on a reported 6-year 80 million dollar deal. After several days, it was officially announced on August 18 that Iguodala had signed the deal.

On August 19 Philly.com announced that veteran backup big man Theo Ratliff had agreed to terms on veterans league minimum 1 year 1.4 million dollar deal with the 76ers. Ratliff had previously played with Philadelphia from 1997 to 2001. Ratliff was named an All-Star in 2001, but was unable to play because of an injury.

On September 1, 2008, following his placement on waivers Donyell Marshall agreed to terms with the Philadelphia 76ers for a one-year contract for the league minimum $1,262,275 (for veterans with at least 10 years of experience). The story was first reported by The Philadelphia Daily News

== Draft picks ==
Round	Pick	Player	Position	Nationality	College
1	16	Marreese Speights	Power forward	United States	Florida (So.)

== Roster ==
2008–09 Philadelphia 76ers roster
Players

Pos.	No.	Player	Height	Weight	DOB	From
F/C	42	Elton Brand	6 ft 8 in (2.03 m)	254 lb (115 kg)		Duke
C	1	Samuel Dalembert	6 ft 11 in (2.11 m)	250 lb (113 kg)		Seton Hall
F/C	30	Reggie Evans	6 ft 8 in (2.03 m)	245 lb (111 kg)		Iowa
SG	33	Willie Green	6 ft 3 in (1.91 m)	201 lb (91 kg)		Detroit Mercy
G/F	9	Andre Iguodala	6 ft 6 in (1.98 m)	207 lb (94 kg)		Arizona
G/F	12	Royal Ivey	6 ft 4 in (1.93 m)	215 lb (98 kg)		Texas
F	8	Donyell Marshall	6 ft 9 in (2.06 m)	245 lb (111 kg)		Connecticut
G	7	Andre Miller	6 ft 2 in (1.88 m)	205 lb (93 kg)		Utah
C	50	Theo Ratliff	6 ft 10 in (2.08 m)	235 lb (107 kg)		Wyoming
G	4	Kareem Rush	6 ft 6 in (1.98 m)	215 lb (98 kg)		Missouri
F/C	14	Jason Smith	7 ft 0 in (2.13 m)	240 lb (109 kg)		Colorado State
F/C	16	Marreese Speights	6 ft 10 in (2.08 m)	245 lb (111 kg)		Florida
G	23	Louis Williams	6 ft 1 in (1.85 m)	175 lb (79 kg)		South Gwinnett HS (GA)
F	21	Thaddeus Young	6 ft 8 in (2.03 m)	220 lb (100 kg)		Georgia Tech

Coaches
Head coach
- Tony DiLeo
Assistant(s)
- John Loyer
- Jim Lynam
- Moses Malone
- Aaron McKie
- Bernard Smith
- Kevin N. Johnson (trainer)

Legend
- (DP) Unsigned draft pick
- (FA) Free agent
- (S) Suspended
- Injured

== Regular season ==
=== Standings ===
Atlantic Division	W	L	PCT	GB	Home	Road	Div
y-Boston Celtics	62	20	.756	—	35–6	27–14	15–1
x-Philadelphia 76ers	41	41	.500	21	24–17	17–24	6–10
New Jersey Nets	34	48	.415	28	19–22	15–26	8–8
Toronto Raptors	33	49	.402	29	18–23	15–26	6–10
New York Knicks	32	50	.390	30	20–21	12–29	5–11

#	Eastern Conference				
#	Team	W	L	PCT	GB
1	z-Cleveland Cavaliers	66	16	.805	—
2	y-Boston Celtics	62	20	.756	4
3	y-Orlando Magic	59	23	.720	7
4	x-Atlanta Hawks	47	35	.573	19
5	x-Miami Heat	43	39	.524	23
6	x-Philadelphia 76ers	41	41	.500	25
7	x-Chicago Bulls	41	41	.500	25
8	x-Detroit Pistons	39	43	.476	27
9	Indiana Pacers	36	46	.439	30
10	Charlotte Bobcats	35	47	.427	31
11	New Jersey Nets	34	48	.415	32
12	Milwaukee Bucks	34	48	.415	32
13	Toronto Raptors	33	49	.402	33
14	New York Knicks	32	50	.390	34
15	Washington Wizards	19	63	.232	47

=== Game log ===
2008–09 game log
October: 1–1 (home: 1–1; road: 0–0)

Game	Date	Team	Score	High points	High rebounds	High assists	Location Attendance	Record
1	October 29	Toronto	L 84–95	Louis Williams (16)	Samuel Dalembert (17)	Andre Iguodala (6)	Wachovia Center; 15,750	0–1
2	October 31	New York	W 116–87	Elton Brand (24)	Elton Brand (14)	Andre Miller (8)	Wachovia Center; 11,717	1–1

November : 6–9 (home: 4–3; road: 2–6)

Game	Date	Team	Score	High points	High rebounds	High assists	Location Attendance	Record
3	November 1	@ Atlanta	L 88–95	Thaddeus Young (22)	Elton Brand (16)	Andre Miller (8)	Philips Arena; 19,651	1–2
4	November 3	Sacramento	W 125–91	Thaddeus Young (18)	Samuel Dalembert (6)	Andre Miller (5)	Wachovia Center; 10,100	2–2
5	November 5	@ Miami	L 83–106	Thaddeus Young (19)	Elton Brand (12)	Andre Miller (6)	American Airlines Arena; 15,103	2–3
6	November 6	@ Orlando	L 88–98	Thaddeus Young (19)	Samuel Dalembert (14)	Andre Iguodala (8)	Amway Arena; 16,407	2–4
7	November 11	Utah	L 80–93	Andre Miller (25)	Thaddeus Young, Samuel Dalembert (11)	Andre Miller (6)	Wachovia Center; 12,839	2–5
8	November 12	@ Toronto	W 106–96	Elton Brand (25)	Andre Iguodala (9)	Andre Iguodala (10)	Air Canada Centre; 18,093	3–5
9	November 14	@ Indiana	W 94–92	Thaddeus Young (25)	Elton Brand (15)	Andre Miller, Elton Brand, Willie Green, Andre Iguodala (2)	Conseco Fieldhouse; 12,742	4–5
10	November 15	Oklahoma City	W 110–85	Thaddeus Young (23)	Samuel Dalembert (16)	Andre Miller (9)	Wachovia Center; 13,385	5–5
11	November 19	@ Minnesota	L 96–102	Andre Miller (20)	Elton Brand (13)	Andre Miller, Andre Iguodala (6)	Target Center; 10,111	5–6
12	November 21	L.A. Clippers	W 89–88	Elton Brand, Thaddeus Young (17)	Elton Brand, Samuel Dalembert (8)	Andre Iguodala (12)	Wachovia Center; 13,474	6–6
13	November 23	Golden State	W 89–81	Elton Brand (23)	Samuel Dalembert (16)	Andre Miller (8)	Wachovia Center; 13,556	7–6
14	November 24	@ Charlotte	L 84–93	Elton Brand (18)	Elton Brand (9)	Andre Miller (6)	Time Warner Cable Arena; 10,848	7–7
15	November 26	Orlando	L 94–96	Elton Brand (21)	Samuel Dalembert (7)	Andre Iguodala (7)	Wachovia Center; 14,985	7–8
16	November 28	@ Boston	L 78–102	Elton Brand (18)	Elton Brand (8)	Louis Williams (6)	TD Banknorth Garden; 18,624	7–9
17	November 30	Chicago	L 92–103	Elton Brand (21)	Elton Brand (12)	Andre Miller (10)	Wachovia Center; 13,561	7–10

December : 6–8 (home: 2–4; road: 4–4)

Game	Date	Team	Score	High points	High rebounds	High assists	Location Attendance	Record
18	December 2	@ Chicago	W 103–95 (OT)	Andre Miller (28)	Elton Brand (14)	Andre Iguodala (5)	United Center; 20,485	8–10
19	December 3	L.A. Lakers	L 102–114	Andre Miller (26)	Andre Miller, Thaddeus Young, Samuel Dalembert (8)	Andre Miller, Andre Iguodala (5)	Wachovia Center; 19,119	8–11
20	December 5	@ Detroit	W 96–91	Andre Miller (19)	Andre Iguodala (8)	Andre Iguodala (5)	The Palace of Auburn Hills; 22,076	9–11
21	December 6	New Jersey	L 84–95	Andre Iguodala (20)	Andre Iguodala (11)	Andre Miller (5)	Wachovia Center; 13,096	9–12
22	December 10	Cleveland	L 93–101	Andre Iguodala (27)	Elton Brand (10)	Andre Miller (8)	Wachovia Center; 15,550	9–13
23	December 12	@ Cleveland	L 72–88	Willie Green (19)	Elton Brand (11)	Andre Miller (7)	Quicken Loans Arena; 20,562	9–14
24	December 13	Washington	W 104–89	Elton Brand (27)	Samuel Dalembert (17)	Andre Miller (12)	Wachovia Center; 15,865	10–14
25	December 17	Milwaukee	W 93–88	Louis Williams (25)	Reggie Evans (9)	Andre Iguodala (7)	Wachovia Center; 11,538	11–14
26	December 19	@ Washington	W 109–103	Louis Williams (26)	Andre Iguodala (9)	Andre Miller (6)	Verizon Center; 18,323	12–14
27	December 20	Indiana	L 94–95	Andre Iguodala (26)	Samuel Dalembert (14)	Andre Miller (12)	Wachovia Center; 14,599	12–15
28	December 23	@ Boston	L 91–110	Louis Williams, Marreese Speights (16)	Samuel Dalembert (13)	Louis Williams, Andre Miller (8)	TD Banknorth Garden; 18,624	12–16
29	December 26	@ Denver	L 101–105	Andre Iguodala (24)	Samuel Dalembert (13)	Andre Miller (8)	Pepsi Center; 19,155	12–17
30	December 29	@ Utah	L 95–112	Andre Iguodala, Thaddeus Young (17)	Reggie Evans (12)	Andre Miller (8)	EnergySolutions Arena; 19,911	12–18
31	December 31	@ L.A. Clippers	W 100–92	Andre Iguodala (28)	Theo Ratliff (8)	Andre Miller (9)	Staples Center; 14,021	13–18

January : 10–5 (home: 6–2; road: 4–3)

Game	Date	Team	Score	High points	High rebounds	High assists	Location Attendance	Record
32	January 2	@ Dallas	L 86–96	Andre Iguodala (22)	Andre Miller (11)	Andre Iguodala (5)	American Airlines Center; 20,327	13–19
33	January 3	@ San Antonio	L 106–108	Andre Miller (28)	Andre Iguodala (8)	Andre Iguodala (8)	AT&T Center; 18,797	13–20
34	January 6	Houston	W 104–96	Andre Iguodala (28)	Marreese Speights (8)	Andre Miller, Louis Williams (8)	Wachovia Center; 14,858	14–20
35	January 7	@ Milwaukee	W 110–105	Andre Miller (28)	Andre Miller (9)	Andre Iguodala (7)	Bradley Center; 13,381	15–20
36	January 9	Charlotte	W 93–87	Andre Miller (22)	Samuel Dalembert (9)	Andre Iguodala (7)	Wachovia Center; 14,235	16–20
37	January 11	@ Atlanta	W 109–94	Andre Iguodala (27)	Thaddeus Young (9)	Andre Iguodala (9)	Philips Arena; 15,079	17–20
38	January 14	Portland	W 100–79	Andre Iguodala (29)	Samuel Dalembert (9)	Louis Williams, Andre Iguodala, Andre Miller (6)	Wachovia Center; 14,561	18–20
39	January 16	San Antonio	W 109–87	Thaddeus Young (27)	Samuel Dalembert (12)	Andre Iguodala (8)	Wachovia Center; 18,739	19–20
40	January 17	@ New York	W 107–97	Andre Iguodala (28)	Andre Iguodala, Thaddeus Young (10)	Andre Miller (8)	Madison Square Garden; 19,408	20–20
41	January 19	Dallas	L 93–95	Louis Williams (25)	Andre Iguodala (12)	Andre Miller (7)	Wachovia Center; 14,503	20–21
42	January 24	New York	W 116–110	Andre Iguodala (24)	Samuel Dalembert (17)	Andre Iguodala (6)	Wachovia Center; 19,239	21–21
43	January 26	@ New Orleans	L 86–101	Thaddeus Young (22)	Samuel Dalembert (12)	Andre Iguodala (7)	New Orleans Arena; 16,131	21–22
44	January 28	@ Houston	W 95–93	Andre Iguodala (20)	Samuel Dalembert (13)	Andre Miller (7)	Toyota Center; 15,544	22–22
45	January 30	Washington	W 104–94	Andre Iguodala, Willie Green (20)	Thaddeus Young (9)	Andre Miller (9)	Wachovia Center; 15,528	23–22
46	January 31	New Jersey	L 83–85	Andre Miller (19)	Elton Brand (9)	Andre Miller (7)	Wachovia Center; 17,783	23–23

February : 6–6 (home: 4–3; road: 2–3)

Game	Date	Team	Score	High points	High rebounds	High assists	Location Attendance	Record
47	February 3	Boston	L 99–100	Andre Iguodala (22)	Reggie Evans (10)	Andre Miller (7)	Wachovia Center; 16,831	23–24
48	February 5	Indiana	W 99–94	Willie Green (23)	Samuel Dalembert (20)	Andre Miller (12)	Wachovia Center; 10,699	24–24
49	February 7	Miami	W 94–84	Andre Miller, Marreese Speights (15)	Samuel Dalembert (10)	Andre Miller, Andre Iguodala (5)	Wachovia Center; 17,216	25–24
50	February 9	Phoenix	W 108–91	Thaddeus Young (25)	Samuel Dalembert (11)	Andre Iguodala (7)	Wachovia Center; 16,797	26–24
51	February 11	Memphis	W 91–87	Andre Miller (24)	Samuel Dalembert (7)	Andre Miller (9)	Wachovia Center; 12,812	27–24
52	February 17	@ Indiana	L 91–100	Andre Iguodala (20)	Reggie Evans (11)	Andre Iguodala (9)	Conseco Fieldhouse; 13,259	27–25
53	February 18	Denver	L 89–101	Andre Miller (17)	Samuel Dalembert, Marreese Speights (10)	Andre Iguodala (4)	Wachovia Center; 15,979	27–26
54	February 21	@ Miami	L 91–97	Andre Miller (30)	Andre Miller (9)	Andre Iguodala (8)	American Airlines Arena; 19,600	27–27
55	February 23	@ New Jersey	L 96–98	Andre Iguodala (21)	Samuel Dalembert (10)	Andre Miller (10)	Izod Center; 13,236	27–28
56	February 25	@ Washington	W 106–98	Andre Iguodala (22)	Samuel Dalembert (13)	Andre Iguodala (11)	Verizon Center; 16,505	28–28
57	February 27	@ New York	W 108–103	Andre Miller (25)	Samuel Dalembert (14)	Andre Miller (6)	Madison Square Garden; 19,763	29–28
58	February 28	Orlando	L 100–106	Andre Miller (23)	Andre Miller (8)	Andre Miller (7)	Wachovia Center; 19,703	29–29

March : 9–6 (home: 5–2; road: 4–4)

Game	Date	Team	Score	High points	High rebounds	High assists	Location Attendance	Record
59	March 2	New Orleans	L 91–98	Andre Iguodala (30)	Reggie Evans (8)	Andre Miller (7)	Wachovia Center; 14,299	29–30
60	March 7	@ Memphis	W 110–105	Andre Iguodala (24)	Andre Miller (10)	Andre Miller (8)	FedExForum; 14,458	30–30
61	March 8	@ Oklahoma City	L 74–89	Thaddeus Young, Andre Miller (20)	Andre Iguodala (8)	Andre Iguodala, Andre Miller (3)	Ford Center; 18,738	30–31
62	March 11	Toronto	W 115–106	Thaddeus Young (29)	Samuel Dalembert (13)	Andre Iguodala, Andre Miller (7)	Wachovia Center; 17,292	31–31
63	March 13	Chicago	W 104–101	Thaddeus Young (31)	Samuel Dalembert (19)	Andre Miller (13)	Wachovia Spectrum; 17,563	32–31
64	March 15	Miami	W 85–77	Andre Iguodala (21)	Samuel Dalembert (12)	Andre Miller (11)	Wachovia Center; 20,100	33–31
65	March 17	@ L.A. Lakers	W 94–93	Andre Iguodala (25)	Samuel Dalembert (14)	Louis Williams, Andre Miller (6)	Staples Center; 18,997	34–31
66	March 18	@ Phoenix	L 116–126	Andre Miller, Thaddeus Young (23)	Samuel Dalembert (6)	Andre Miller (8)	US Airways Center; 18,422	34–32
67	March 20	@ Golden State	L 111–119	Thaddeus Young (23)	Samuel Dalembert (23)	Andre Iguodala (7)	Oracle Arena; 19,596	34–33
68	March 22	@ Sacramento	W 112–100	Andre Iguodala (27)	Andre Iguodala (7)	Andre Miller (8)	ARCO Arena; 12,943	35–33
69	March 23	@ Portland	W 114–108 (OT)	Andre Miller (27)	Andre Miller (10)	Andre Iguodala (5)	Rose Garden; 20,620	36–33
70	March 25	Minnesota	W 96–88	Thaddeus Young (29)	Andre Iguodala, Andre Miller, Samuel Dalembert (7)	Andre Iguodala (6)	Wachovia Center; 16,965	37–33
71	March 27	Charlotte	L 95–100	Andre Iguodala (25)	Thaddeus Young (7)	Thaddeus Young (4)	Wachovia Center; 19,098	37–34
72	March 29	@ Detroit	L 97–101	Andre Iguodala (27)	Thaddeus Young (8)	Andre Miller (6)	The Palace of Auburn Hills; 22,076	37–35
73	March 31	Atlanta	W 98–85	Andre Iguodala (19)	Samuel Dalembert (7)	Andre Miller (10)	Wachovia Center; 18,256	38–35

April : 3–6 (home: 2–2; road: 1–4)

Game	Date	Team	Score	High points	High rebounds	High assists	Location Attendance	Record
74	April 2	Milwaukee	W 105–95	Louis Williams (21)	Samuel Dalembert (10)	Andre Miller (11)	Wachovia Center; 17,640	39–35
75	April 4	Detroit	W 95–90	Andre Iguodala (31)	Andre Miller (10)	Andre Miller (12)	Wachovia Center; 19,832	40–35
76	April 5	@ New Jersey	L 67–96	Louis Williams (14)	Reggie Evans, Samuel Dalembert (11)	Andre Iguodala (5)	Izod Center; 13,345	40–36
77	April 7	@ Charlotte	L 98–101	Andre Miller (23)	Theo Ratliff (5)	Andre Miller (7)	Time Warner Cable Arena; 16,499	40–37
78	April 9	@ Chicago	L 99–113	Andre Miller (20)	Andre Iguodala (7)	Andre Iguodala (10)	United Center; 20,791	40–38
79	April 10	Cleveland	L 92–102	Andre Iguodala (26)	Samuel Dalembert (7)	Willie Green (4)	Wachovia Center; 20,484	40–39
80	April 12	@ Toronto	L 104–111	Louis Williams (23)	Samuel Dalembert (12)	Andre Iguodala (8)	Air Canada Centre; 18,018	40–40
81	April 14	Boston	L 98–100	Andre Iguodala (25)	Samuel Dalembert (9)	Andre Miller (9)	Wachovia Center; 17,752	40–41
82	April 15	@ Cleveland	W 111–110 (OT)	Andre Miller (28)	Thaddeus Young (9)	Andre Miller (8)	Quicken Loans Arena; 20,562	41–41

2015–16 season schedule

== Playoffs ==
=== First round ===
In the first round of the 2009 NBA Playoffs, the sixth seeded Philadelphia 76ers were paired with the third seed Southeast Division champions and eventual Eastern Conference champion Orlando Magic in a best-of-seven series. The Sixers managed to split the series with the Magic at two games a piece after four games, but the Magic went on to win what would be the final two games of the series to eliminate the Sixers.

=== Game log ===
2009 playoff game log
First Round: 2–4 (home: 1–2; road: 1–2)

Game	Date	Team	Score	High points	High rebounds	High assists	Location Attendance	Record
1	April 19	@ Orlando	W 100–98	Andre Iguodala (20)	Andre Iguodala (8)	Andre Iguodala (8)	Amway Arena; 17,461	1–0
2	April 22	@ Orlando	L 87–96	Andre Miller (30)	Andre Iguodala, Theo Ratliff (8)	Andre Iguodala (7)	Amway Arena; 17,461	1–1
3	April 24	Orlando	W 96–94	Andre Iguodala (29)	Andre Miller, Samuel Dalembert (9)	Andre Miller (7)	Wachovia Center; 16,492	2–1
4	April 26	Orlando	L 81–84	Andre Miller (17)	Samuel Dalembert (9)	Andre Iguodala (11)	Wachovia Center; 16,464	2–2
5	April 28	@ Orlando	L 78–91	Andre Iguodala (26)	Andre Miller (6)	Samuel Dalembert (9)	Amway Arena; 17,461	2–3
6	April 30	Orlando	L 89–114	Andre Miller (24)	Andre Iguodala (6)	Samuel Dalembert (13)	Wachovia Center; 16,691	2–4

2016 playoff schedule

== Player statistics ==
Legend
GP	Games played	GS	Games started	MPG	Minutes per game
FG%	Field-goal percentage	3P%	3-point field-goal percentage	FT%	Free-throw percentage
RPG	Rebounds per game	APG	Assists per game	SPG	Steals per game
BPG	Blocks per game	PPG	Points per game

=== Season ===
Player	GP	GS	MPG	FG%	3P%	FT%	RPG	APG	SPG	BPG	PPG
Elton Brand	29	23	31.7	.447	.000	.676	8.8	1.3	0.59	1.55	13.8
Samuel Dalembert	82	82	24.8	.498	.000	.734	8.5	0.2	0.40	1.78	6.4
Reggie Evans	79	7	14.4	.444	.000	.594	4.6	0.3	0.52	0.10	3.3
Willie Green	81	60	22.6	.435	.317	.729	1.6	2.0	0.65	0.16	8.5
Andre Iguodala	82	82	39.9	.473	.307	.724	5.7	5.3	1.60	0.44	18.8
Royal Ivey	71	0	12.1	.332	.342	.791	1.1	0.6	0.51	0.10	3.0
Donyell Marshall	25	0	7.6	.452	.455	.500	1.6	0.6	0.16	0.20	3.8
Andre Miller	82	82	36.3	.473	.283	.826	4.5	6.5	1.33	0.17	16.3
Theo Ratliff	46	0	12.6	.531	.000	.600	2.8	0.2	0.37	1.02	1.9
Kareem Rush	25	1	8.0	.345	.303	1.000	0.6	0.6	0.20	0.04	2.2
Marreese Speights	79	2	16.0	.502	.250	.773	3.7	0.4	0.34	0.71	7.7
Louis Williams	81	0	23.7	.398	.286	.790	2.0	3.0	1.05	0.17	12.8
Thaddeus Young	75	71	34.4	.495	.341	.735	5.0	1.1	1.33	0.31	15.3

=== Playoffs ===
Player	GP	GS	MPG	FG%	3P%	FT%	RPG	APG	SPG	BPG	PPG
Samuel Dalembert	6	6	22.2	.615	.000	.750	7.8	0.5	0.33	1.50	5.8
Reggie Evans	5	0	7.2	.222	.000	.750	2.0	0.0	0.60	0.00	1.4
Willie Green	6	6	24.5	.412	.364	.333	1.0	1.2	0.00	0.17	7.8
Andre Iguodala	6	6	44.8	.449	.393	.652	6.3	6.7	1.83	0.00	21.5
Royal Ivey	6	0	7.5	.273	.286	.750	0.7	0.0	0.50	0.00	1.8
Donyell Marshall	6	0	8.3	.375	.364	.000	1.2	0.0	0.17	0.17	2.7
Andre Miller	6	6	43.0	.475	.300	.824	6.3	5.3	1.17	0.17	21.2
Theo Ratliff	6	0	15.7	.818	.000	.500	3.8	0.0	0.17	0.67	3.3
Marreese Speights	3	0	9.7	.429	.000	.750	2.0	0.0	0.00	0.00	3.0
Louis Williams	6	0	24.8	.412	.375	.667	2.5	2.8	0.50	0.17	9.7
Thaddeus Young	6	6	38.2	.449	.417	.833	4.5	1.3	1.00	0.17	12.0

== Awards and records ==
=== Awards ===
- Thaddeus Young was selected as a member of the sophomore team in the T-Mobile Rookie Challenge on All-Star Weekend.

== Injuries and surgeries ==
- August 7: Jason Smith tore his ACL at an offseason Las Vegas NBA Camp.
- February 5: Elton Brand tore the labrum of his right shoulder and it was announced that he would undergo season ending surgery on February 9.

== Transactions ==
=== Trades ===
July 9, 2008	To Philadelphia 76ers conditional 2nd round pick (top-55 protected; not converted)	To Minnesota Timberwolves Rodney Carney, Calvin Booth, 2010 1st round pick & cash considerations

=== Free agents ===
==== Additions ====
Player	Signed	Former team
Elton Brand	July 9	Los Angeles Clippers
Royal Ivey	July 28	Milwaukee Bucks
Kareem Rush	July 29	Indiana Pacers
Theo Ratliff	August 19	Detroit Pistons
Donyell Marshall	September 1	Seattle SuperSonics via Oklahoma City Thunder

==== Subtractions ====
Player	Left	New team
Herbert Hill	July 1	Free agent
Louis Amundson	July 11	Phoenix Suns
Shavlik Randolph	September 25	Portland Trail Blazers
Kevin Ollie	September 30	Minnesota Timberwolves
