= Elton Brand =

American basketball player (born 1979)

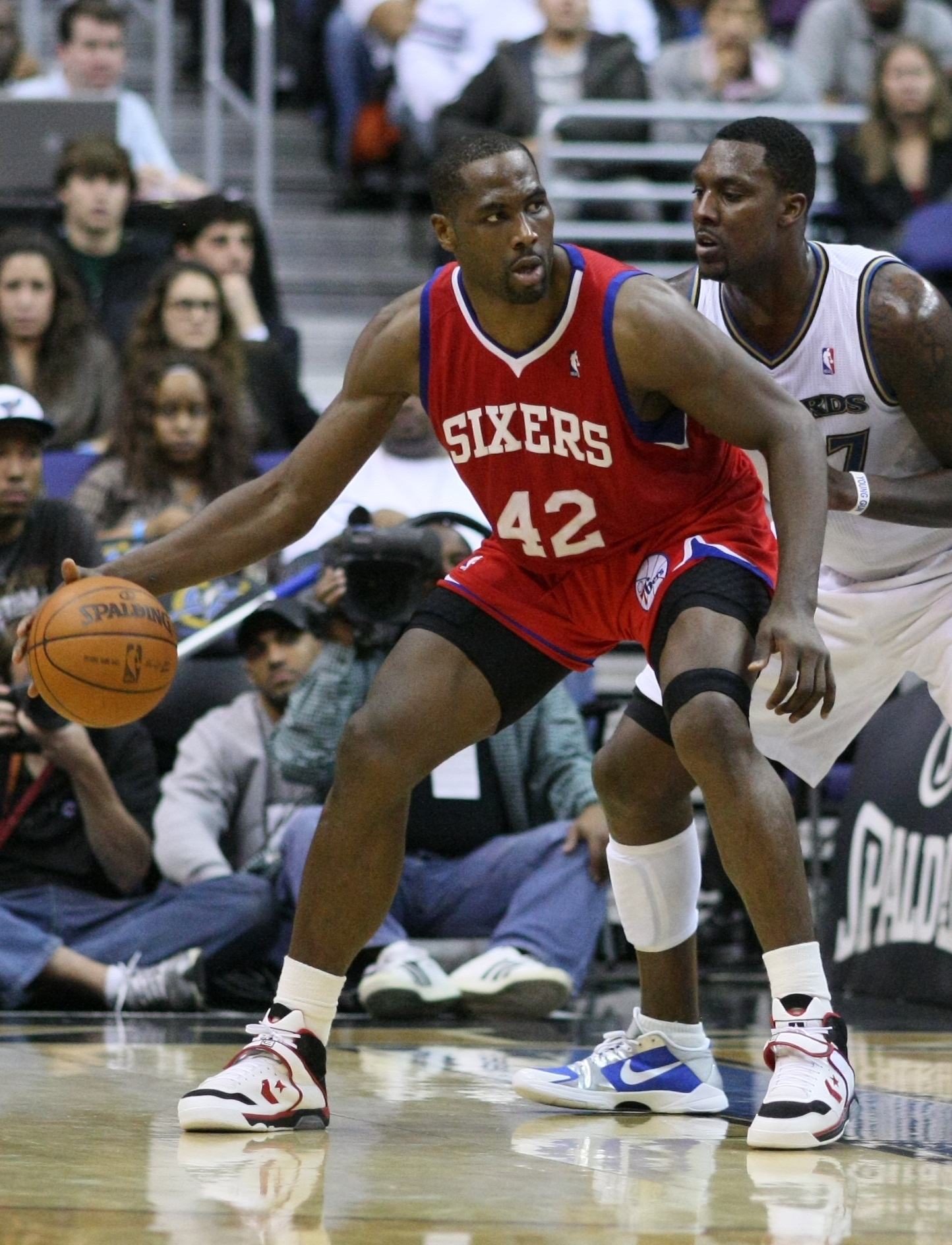
- Brand with the Philadelphia 76ers in 2010

Personal information
- Born: March 11, 1979 (age 47) Cortlandt Manor, New York, U.S.
- Listed height: 6 ft 9 in (2.06 m)
- Listed weight: 254 lb (115 kg)

Career information
- High school: Peekskill (Peekskill, New York)
- College: Duke (1997–1999)
- NBA draft: 1999: 1st round, 1st overall pick
- Drafted by: Chicago Bulls
- Playing career: 1999–2016
- Position: Power forward / center
- Number: 42, 7

Career history
- 1999–2001: Chicago Bulls
- 2001–2008: Los Angeles Clippers
- 2008–2012: Philadelphia 76ers
- 2012–2013: Dallas Mavericks
- 2013–2015: Atlanta Hawks
- 2016: Philadelphia 76ers

Career highlights
- 2× NBA All-Star (2002, 2006); All-NBA Second Team (2006); NBA Rookie of the Year (2000); NBA All-Rookie First Team (2000); National college player of the year (1999); Consensus first-team All-American (1999); ACC Athlete of the Year (1999); ACC Player of the Year (1999); First-team All-ACC (1999); USA Basketball Male Athlete of the Year (1998); McDonald's All-American (1997); First-team Parade All-American (1997); Mr. New York Basketball (1997)

Career statistics
- Points: 16,827 (15.9 ppg)
- Rebounds: 9,040 (8.5 rpg)
- Blocks: 1,828 (1.7 bpg)
- Stats at NBA.com
- Stats at Basketball Reference
Medals
Men's basketball
Representing United States
FIBA World Championship
| Bronze medal – third place | 2006 Japan | USA |
FIBA Americas Championship
| Gold medal – first place | 1999 San Juan | USA |
| Gold medal – first place | 2003 San Juan | USA |
Goodwill Games
| Gold medal – first place | 1998 New York | USA |

Elton Tyron Brand (born March 11, 1979) is an American former professional basketball player who most recently served as general manager of the Philadelphia 76ers of the National Basketball Association (NBA). After playing college basketball for Duke, he was selected with the first overall pick in the 1999 NBA draft by the Chicago Bulls, and later played for the Philadelphia 76ers, the Los Angeles Clippers, Dallas Mavericks and Atlanta Hawks. He was a two-time NBA All Star and an All-NBA Second Team selection in 2006.

== High school career ==
Brand attended Peekskill High School, where he was immediately added to the varsity basketball roster. He averaged 40 points and 20 rebounds per game, played AAU basketball with future NBA players Lamar Odom and Ron Artest, and by his senior year he was consistently ranked among the top high school basketball players in the country and was selected as New York State Mr. Basketball. At the same time, he became something of a cult hero in Peekskill, helping his team win two state championships. Recruited heavily after his successful high school career, Brand decided to enroll at Duke University alongside a cluster of other high school stars, including Shane Battier.

== College career ==
As a sophomore, Brand was the dominant inside presence for a Duke team that is widely regarded as one of the most talented teams in recent NCAA history. After leading the Blue Devils to the championship game of the Final Four—where they were upset by the Connecticut Huskies—Brand was named the consensus National Player of the Year. He subsequently decided to leave Duke after his sophomore season and declared for the 1999 NBA draft. Brand, sophomore William Avery, and freshman Corey Maggette, were the first three players under Mike Krzyzewski to leave early for the draft and not play the full four years at Duke.

== Professional career ==
=== Chicago Bulls (1999–2001) ===
On June 30, 1999, Brand was selected by the Chicago Bulls with the first overall pick in the 1999 NBA draft. On November 19, Brand scored 29 points, grabbed 17 rebounds, and blocked 4 shots in the ninth game of his career, a 103–95 loss to the Los Angeles Lakers. He was later named the most valuable player of the Rookie Challenge over All-Star Weekend. He ended the season with averages of 20.1 points and 10 rebounds per game, and he shared NBA Rookie of the Year honors with Houston Rockets guard Steve Francis. Despite his personal success, Brand and the Bulls finished with the second worst record in the league at 17–65.

Through much of the 2000–01 season, Brand was hailed as the linchpin of a possible new Chicago dynasty. On December 31, Brand scored a season high 31 points and grabbed 16 rebounds in a 86–75 win over the New Jersey Nets. Brand averaged 20.1 points and 10.1 rebounds per game; his 3.9 offensive rebounds per game were the second-best in the NBA. As a team however, again the Bulls struggled, finishing with an even worse record at 15–67.

=== Los Angeles Clippers (2001–2008) ===
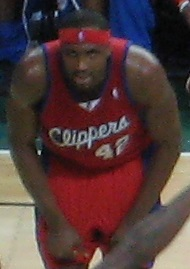
Brand played with the Los Angeles Clippers for seven seasons.

After two successful seasons with the Bulls, Brand was traded to the Los Angeles Clippers in June 2001 for Brian Skinner and the draft rights to Tyson Chandler. In 2002, Brand became the first Clipper since Danny Manning (in 1994) to be selected to the All-Star team.

When Brand became a restricted free agent in 2003, the Miami Heat made an offer worth $82 million over six years. In what was an unprecedented move by team owner Donald Sterling, the Clippers matched Miami's offer and managed to keep Brand a Clipper. Prior to this, the biggest contract Sterling had approved to that point was a five-year, $15 million deal for Eric Piatkowski in 1998. Sterling had also refused to offer Brand a contract extension one year prior, when he was willing to accept less than the maximum.

In the 2006 NBA season, Brand experienced a professional renaissance. He posted career-highs in points per game (24.7) and field-goal percentage (52.7), while leading the Clippers to a 47–35 record, their then-best record in team history, and good enough for the sixth seed in the Western Conference. Brand was selected to the 2006 NBA All-Star Game and considered as a strong candidate for the 2006 NBA MVP. Brand led the franchise to its first playoff series win since 1976, when the team was known as the Buffalo Braves. Although the Clippers eventually lost in Game 7 of the second round (Western Conference Semifinals) against the Phoenix Suns, the Clippers had the best season that their franchise had ever seen at that time. Brand received the Joe Dumars Trophy after being named the 2005–06 NBA Sportsmanship Award winner.

Following his stellar 2005–06 season, Brand regressed somewhat in the following season. His scoring average in 2006–07 dropped and the Clippers missed the playoffs.

He missed most of the 2007–08 season due to a ruptured left Achilles tendon. However, Brand made his return to the Clippers' lineup April 2, 2008 after being out since the end of the previous season. He contributed 19 points in his return. Brand played in only eight games that season. Brand later opted out of the final year of his contract and became a free agent. Sources indicated that Brand chose to opt out from his contract in order to provide Clippers with more payroll flexibility in hopes of strengthening their roster. This came to fruition when Clippers landed Golden State Warriors star Baron Davis. Briefly, this gave Clippers' management and the media the reassurance that Brand would indeed re-sign with the team.

=== Philadelphia 76ers (2008–2012) ===
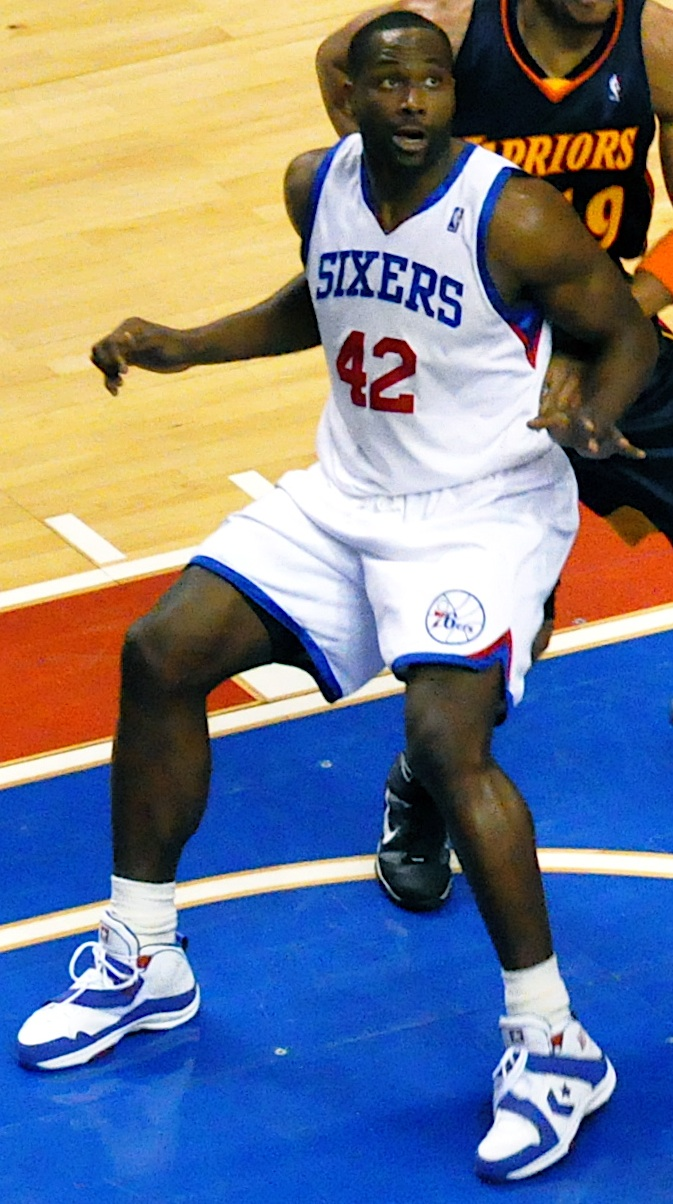
Brand boxing out as a member of the Philadelphia 76ers

On July 9, 2008, Brand signed with the Philadelphia 76ers to a reported five-year, $82 million contract. Brand longed to return to the East Coast, and chose Philadelphia as it was the closest suitor to his hometown of Peekskill, New York.

It was announced on February 5, 2009, that Brand would have season-ending shoulder surgery for the injury he sustained on December 17, 2008. During the game that night against the Milwaukee Bucks, Brand dislocated his shoulder when he was knocked to the floor while going for a rebound. Brand had been coming off of the bench so that he could be slowly worked back into the lineup, but after over a month on the bench and only six games back during which his production was severely limited, the decision was made to go forward with the surgery. The procedure was successfully performed on February 9.

On February 4, 2012, Brand scored a Sixers career high 33 points in a 100–98 win over the New York Knicks. He finished his first tenure with the Philadelphia 76ers averaging 11 points per game and just over 8 rebounds per game during the 2011–12 season. He averaged 8.6 points and 4.8 rebounds in the 2012 NBA Playoffs in a total of 13 games when the Sixers lost in Game 7 of the Eastern Conference Semifinals to the Boston Celtics 85–75.

On July 11, 2012, Brand was released from the 76ers via the amnesty clause.

=== Dallas Mavericks (2012–2013) ===
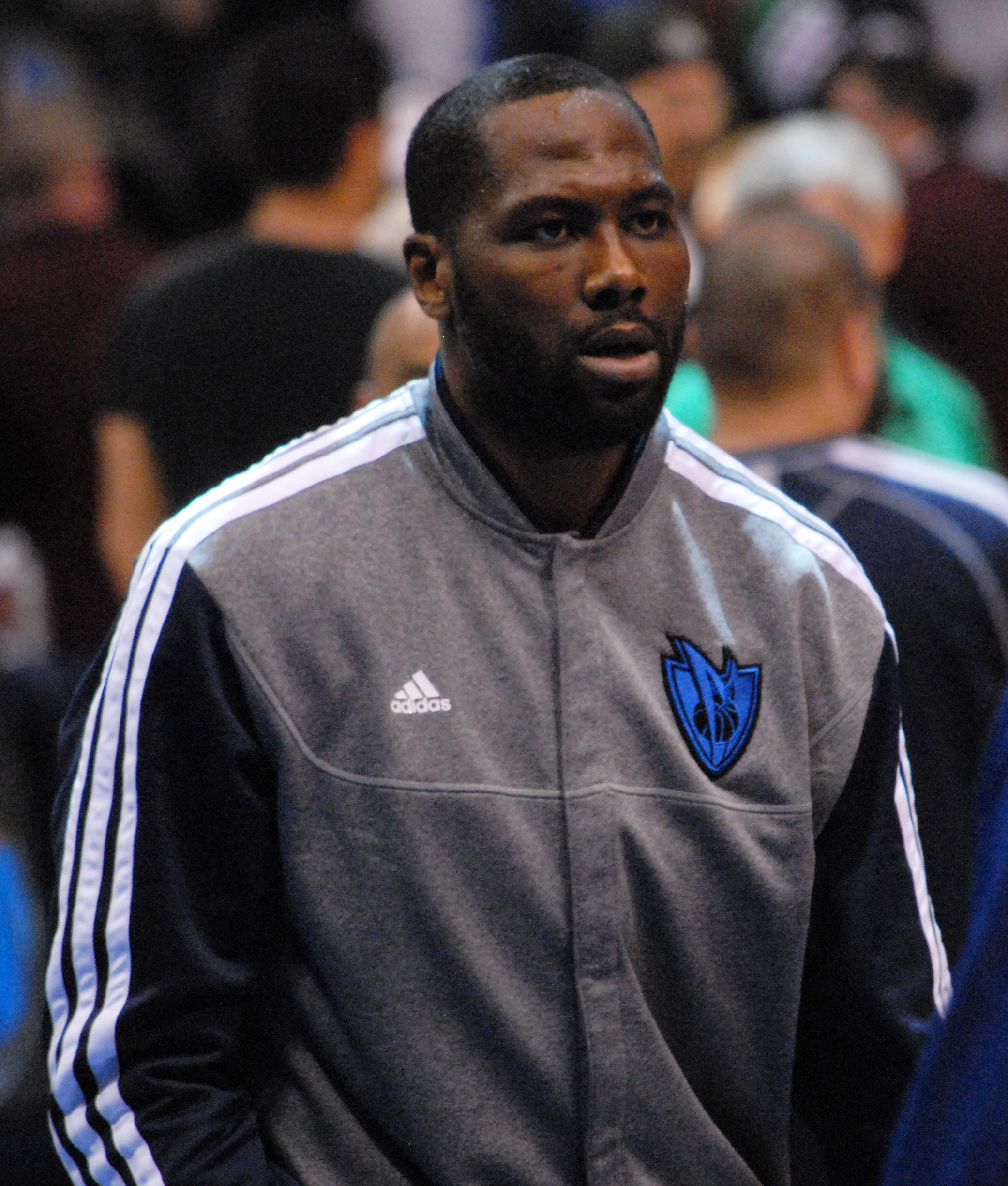
Brand with the Dallas Mavericks

On July 13, 2012, Brand was claimed off waivers by the Dallas Mavericks with a winning bid of $2.1 million. The 76ers still had to pay out the remaining balance of the $18.2 million owed to Brand this season in the final year of his contract.

In 2012–13, he averaged 7.2 points, 6.0 rebounds, 1.3 blocks and 1.0 assists in 21.2 minutes per game. He played 72 games and started 18 of them. The Mavericks finished 41–41 and missed the playoffs for the first time since the 1999–2000 season.

=== Atlanta Hawks and first retirement (2013–2015) ===
On July 15, 2013, Brand signed with the Atlanta Hawks. On September 23, 2014, he re-signed with the Hawks and changed his long-time jersey number of 42, to 7. On August 11, 2015, Brand announced his retirement from professional basketball.

=== Return to the 76ers and second retirement (2016) ===
On January 4, 2016, Brand came out of retirement to re-enter the NBA, citing that Duke coach Mike Krzyzewski helped convince him to return to play. Later that day, he signed with the Philadelphia 76ers, returning to the franchise for a second stint. On January 26, he was activated for the first time, but did not play for the 76ers against the Phoenix Suns. On March 4, he made his season debut for the 76ers, playing in an NBA game for the first time since May 20, 2015. In 13 minutes off the bench, he recorded eight points and four rebounds in a 112–102 loss to the Miami Heat. On March 12, he recorded a 10-point game against the Detroit Pistons, scoring in double digits for the first time since April 14, 2014. On March 27, he recorded a second 10-point game in a loss to the Golden State Warriors. Two days later, he scored seven points and grabbed a season-high nine rebounds in a loss to the Charlotte Hornets, as he became the 51st player in NBA history to reach 9,000 career rebounds.

On September 7, 2016, Brand re-signed with the 76ers. However, on October 20, 2016, he announced his second retirement.

== Post-playing career ==
On December 6, 2016, Brand was named as the player development consultant of the Philadelphia 76ers. On August 28, 2017, he was named general manager of the Delaware 87ers (now Delaware Blue Coats).

On September 20, 2018, Brand was promoted to general manager position of the Philadelphia 76ers. During the 2018-19 season, Brand traded for Jimmy Butler and Tobias Harris.

After the Sixers lost in the conference semifinals, Brand made a series of offseason moves that many, including star center Joel Embiid, believe have come back to haunt the team. Brand re-signed Harris to a 5-year, $180 million contract, re-signed Simmons to a 5-year, $170 million, and signed Al Horford to a four-year, $97 million (with $12 million in bonuses) contract; meanwhile, he allowed Butler and JJ Redick to walk. Harris is now the highest paid player in NBA history to never be an All Star; Simmons missed the 2020 playoffs, crumbled in the 2021 playoffs, and refused to play for the team thereafter; and the Sixers traded Horford after only one season, in which he posted a career low in field goal percentage and his fewest points-per-game in more than a decade. In contrast, Butler led the Miami Heat to the NBA Finals the season after leaving the Sixers, as well as in 2023.

In late 2020, the 76ers hired Daryl Morey as President of Basketball Operations. Although the team simultaneously extended Brand's contract, Brand has ever since "remained mostly behind the scenes."

== Player profile ==
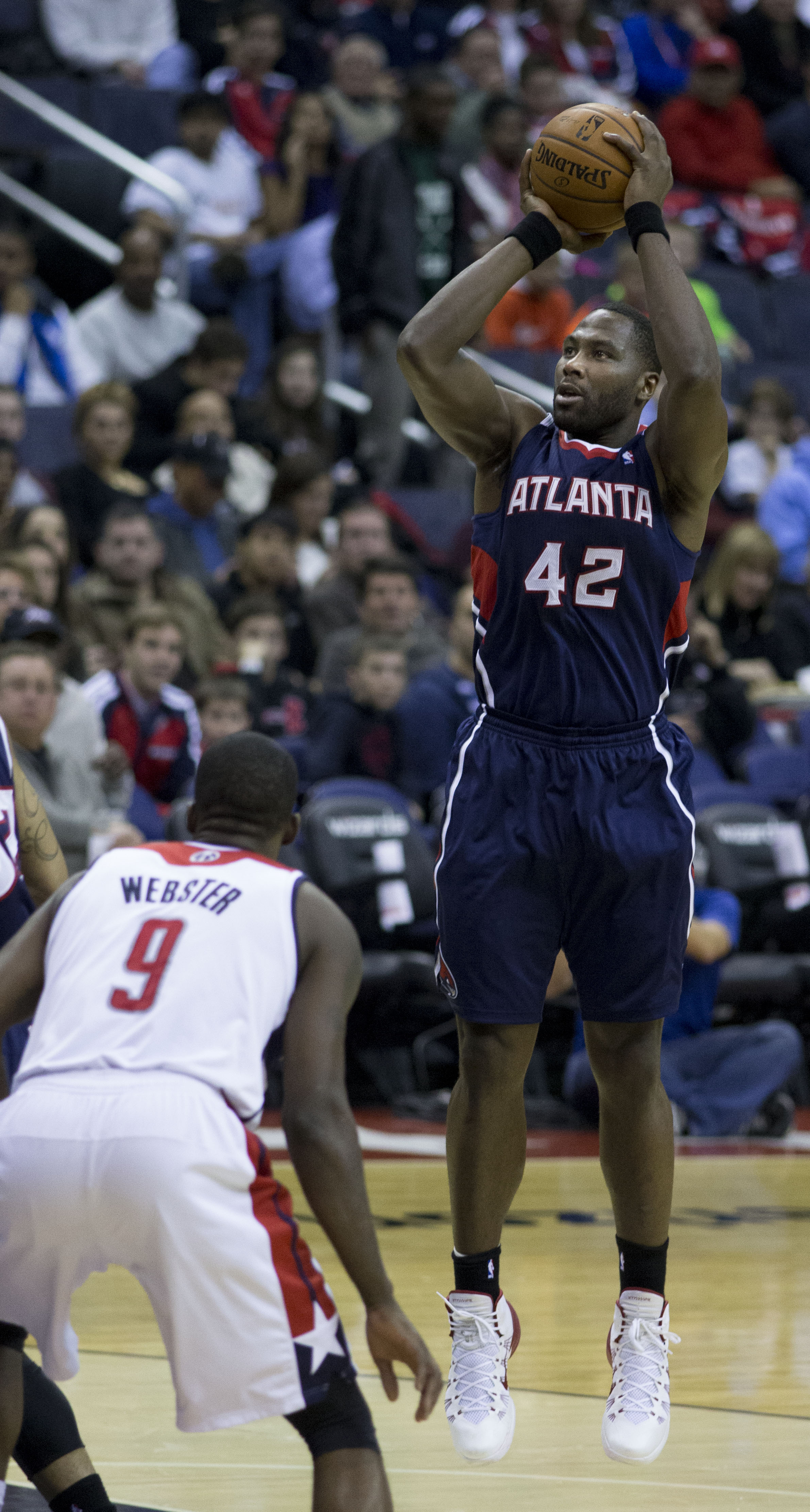
Brand with the Atlanta Hawks in 2013

Early in his career, Brand established himself as one of the top power forwards of the NBA. He holds career averages of 15.9 points, 8.5 rebounds (3.1 being offensive rebounds) and 1.7 blocks per game in 1,058 career games.

Brand uses his wide body and spry athleticism for a man his weight in order to out-muscle his opponents. A large wingspan also allows him to be a proficient shot-blocker.

In his first years in the league, he had a few, but effective and powerful moves underneath the basket which already made him an effective post player. During the off-season prior to the 2005–06 season, he trimmed his weight to increase his quickness and added more finesse moves underneath the basket so that he could score without having to utilize power all the time. But most importantly, he worked on his shooting range and developed a dependable 18 ft. jumper. As a result, he raised his scoring by 4.7 points in that season.

== Accomplishments ==
- 2× NBA All-Star: 2002, 2006
- All-NBA:
  - Second Team: 2006
- NBA All-Rookie First Team: 2000
- NBA co-Rookie of the Year: 2000 (with Steve Francis)
- 2× NBA regular-season leader, offensive rebounds: 2000 (348), 2002 (396)
- Rising Stars Challenge MVP 2000
- Magic Johnson Award: 2002
- NBA Sportsmanship Award: (2006)

== Career statistics ==
Legend
| GP | Games played | GS | Games started | MPG | Minutes per game |
| FG% | Field goal percentage | 3P% | 3-point field goal percentage | FT% | Free throw percentage |
| RPG | Rebounds per game | APG | Assists per game | SPG | Steals per game |
| BPG | Blocks per game | PPG | Points per game | **Bold** | Career high |

=== Regular season ===
| Year | Team | GP | GS | MPG | FG% | 3P% | FT% | RPG | APG | SPG | BPG | PPG |
|---|---|---|---|---|---|---|---|---|---|---|---|---|
| 1999–00 | Chicago | **81** | 80 | 37.0 | .482 | .000 | .685 | 10.0 | 1.9 | .8 | 1.6 | 20.1 |
| 2000–01 | Chicago | 74 | 74 | 39.3 | .476 | .000 | .708 | 10.1 | 3.2 | 1.0 | 1.6 | 20.1 |
| 2001–02 | L.A. Clippers | 80 | 80 | 37.8 | .527 | .000 | .742 | **11.6** | 2.4 | 1.0 | 2.0 | 18.2 |
| 2002–03 | L.A. Clippers | 62 | 61 | **39.6** | .502 | .000 | .685 | 11.3 | 2.5 | **1.1** | **2.5** | 18.5 |
| 2003–04 | L.A. Clippers | 69 | 68 | 38.7 | .493 | .000 | .773 | 10.3 | **3.3** | .9 | 2.2 | 20.0 |
| 2004–05 | L.A. Clippers | **81** | **81** | 37.0 | .503 | .000 | .752 | 9.5 | 2.6 | .8 | 2.1 | 20.0 |
| 2005–06 | L.A. Clippers | 79 | 79 | 39.2 | .527 | .333 | .775 | 10.0 | 2.6 | 1.0 | 2.5 | **24.7** |
| 2006–07 | L.A. Clippers | 80 | 80 | 38.5 | .533 | **1.000** | .761 | 9.3 | 2.9 | 1.0 | 2.2 | 20.5 |
| 2007–08 | L.A. Clippers | 8 | 6 | 34.3 | .456 | .000 | .787 | 8.0 | 2.0 | .4 | 1.9 | 17.6 |
| 2008–09 | Philadelphia | 29 | 23 | 31.7 | .447 | .000 | .676 | 8.8 | 1.3 | .6 | 1.6 | 13.8 |
| 2009–10 | Philadelphia | 76 | 57 | 30.2 | .480 | .000 | .738 | 6.1 | 1.4 | 1.1 | 1.1 | 13.1 |
| 2010–11 | Philadelphia | **81** | **81** | 34.7 | .512 | .000 | .780 | 8.3 | 1.5 | 1.1 | 1.3 | 15.0 |
| 2011–12 | Philadelphia | 60 | 60 | 28.9 | .494 | .000 | .733 | 7.2 | 1.6 | 1.0 | 1.6 | 11.0 |
| 2012–13 | Dallas | 72 | 18 | 21.2 | .473 | .000 | .710 | 6.0 | 1.0 | .7 | 1.3 | 7.2 |
| 2013–14 | Atlanta | 73 | 15 | 19.4 | **.539** | .000 | .649 | 4.9 | 1.0 | .5 | 1.2 | 5.7 |
| 2014–15 | Atlanta | 36 | 4 | 13.5 | .442 | .000 | .522 | 2.8 | .6 | .5 | .7 | 2.7 |
| 2015–16 | Philadelphia | 17 | 1 | 13.2 | .431 | .000 | **.889** | 3.7 | 1.1 | .5 | .5 | 4.1 |
| Career | | 1058 | 868 | 33.0 | .500 | .095 | .736 | 8.5 | 2.1 | .9 | 1.7 | 15.9 |
| All-Star | | 2 | 0 | 18.0 | .563 | .000 | .000 | 8.5 | .5 | .5 | .5 | 9.0 |

=== Playoffs ===
| Year | Team | GP | GS | MPG | FG% | 3P% | FT% | RPG | APG | SPG | BPG | PPG |
|---|---|---|---|---|---|---|---|---|---|---|---|---|
| 2006 | L.A. Clippers | 12 | 12 | **43.1** | **.551** | .000 | .750 | **10.3** | **4.0** | **.9** | **2.6** | **25.4** |
| 2011 | Philadelphia | 5 | 5 | 37.0 | .548 | .000 | .769 | 8.4 | .6 | .4 | 1.2 | 15.6 |
| 2012 | Philadelphia | **13** | **13** | 27.4 | .465 | .000 | .625 | 4.8 | .5 | .8 | 1.5 | 8.6 |
| 2014 | Atlanta | 7 | 0 | 11.6 | .167 | .000 | **.800** | 3.3 | .9 | .1 | .9 | 1.1 |
| 2015 | Atlanta | 3 | 0 | 1.3 | .000 | .000 | .500 | .3 | .0 | .0 | .0 | .3 |
| Career | | 40 | 30 | 28.6 | .516 | .000 | .719 | 6.3 | 1.6 | .6 | 1.6 | 12.6 |

=== College ===
| Year | Team | GP | GS | MPG | FG% | 3P% | FT% | RPG | APG | SPG | BPG | PPG |
|---|---|---|---|---|---|---|---|---|---|---|---|---|
| 1997–98 | Duke | 21 | 18 | 23.5 | .592 | .000 | .604 | 7.3 | 0.5 | **1.5** | 1.3 | 13.4 |
| 1998–99 | Duke | **39** | **37** | **29.3** | **.620** | .000 | **.707** | **9.8** | **1.1** | 1.3 | **2.2** | **17.7** |
| Career | | 60 | 55 | 27.3 | .612 | .000 | .672 | 8.9 | 0.9 | 1.4 | 1.9 | 16.2 |

== Personal life ==
Brand started the Elton Brand Foundation in the spring of 2000. His foundation is an organization that provides support to worthy causes in Chicago, Illinois; Peekskill, New York; and Durham, North Carolina.

In the summer of 2006, Brand married his longtime girlfriend (and fellow Duke student) Shahara Simmons in North Carolina. Brand also played for Team USA in the 2006 FIBA World Basketball Championships, averaging 8.9 points and 3.3 rebounds per game.

Brand made a cameo appearance in the film Just Wright. Brand is a founding member and president of Gibraltar Films, a company engaged in film investment, acquisition, production, and distribution of motion pictures. The first project of Gibraltar Films was the production of a Vietnam-era prisoner-of-war film Rescue Dawn, directed by Werner Herzog. Brand attended the film's premiere at the Toronto International Film Festival.

== See also ==
- List of National Basketball Association career blocks leaders
