= Samuel Dalembert =

Haitian-Canadian basketball player (born 1981)

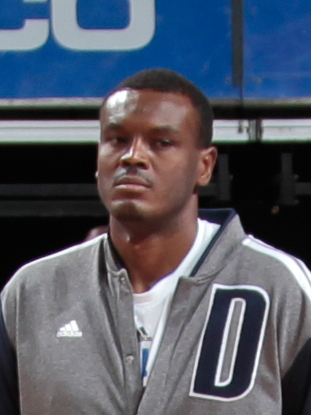
- Dalembert with the Dallas Mavericks in 2014

Personal information
- Born: May 10, 1981 (age 45) Port-au-Prince, Haiti
- Listed height: 6 ft 11 in (2.11 m)
- Listed weight: 255 lb (116 kg)

Career information
- High school: Lucien-Pagé (Montreal, Quebec)
- College: Seton Hall (1999–2001)
- NBA draft: 2001: 1st round, 26th overall pick
- Drafted by: Philadelphia 76ers
- Playing career: 2001–2017
- Position: Center
- Number: 1, 10, 21, 11

Career history
- 2001–2010: Philadelphia 76ers
- 2010–2011: Sacramento Kings
- 2011–2012: Houston Rockets
- 2012–2013: Milwaukee Bucks
- 2013–2014: Dallas Mavericks
- 2014–2015: New York Knicks
- 2015–2017: Shanxi Zhongyu

Career highlights
- Third-team Parade All-American (1999)

Career statistics
- Points: 6,814 (7.7 ppg)
- Rebounds: 6,942 (7.8 rpg)
- Blocks: 1,546 (1.7 bpg)
- Stats at NBA.com
- Stats at Basketball Reference

Samuel Davis Dalembert (born May 10, 1981) is a Haitian-Canadian former professional basketball player who played 13 seasons in the National Basketball Association (NBA). He played college basketball for Seton Hall University. During his active NBA career, Dalembert was known for his rebounding as well as his shot blocking ability.

== High school and college career ==
Dalembert was born in Port-au-Prince, Haiti and lived there for fourteen years before moving to Montreal, where he attended Lucien-Pagé (High School). He also attended St. Patrick High School in Elizabeth, New Jersey. He then went on to play college basketball at Seton Hall from 1999 to 2001.

== Professional career ==
Dalembert was selected with the 26th overall pick by the Philadelphia 76ers in the 2001 NBA draft. After playing 8 seasons with the 76ers, he was traded to the Sacramento Kings for Andrés Nocioni and Spencer Hawes on June 17, 2010.

On December 26, 2011, he signed a multi-year deal with the Houston Rockets.

On June 27, 2012, Dalembert was traded to the Milwaukee Bucks, along with John Henson, the 14th pick in the 2012 NBA draft, for Jon Brockman, Jon Leuer, Shaun Livingston, and Jeremy Lamb, the 12th pick in the 2012 NBA draft.

On July 19, 2013, Dalembert signed with the Dallas Mavericks.

On June 25, 2014, Dalembert, along with Shane Larkin, Wayne Ellington, José Calderón and two 2014 second-round picks, was traded to the New York Knicks in exchange for Tyson Chandler and Raymond Felton. On January 5, 2015, he was waived by the Knicks.

Dalembert's final NBA game was played on December 27, 2014, in a 129–135 loss to the Sacramento Kings. In his final game, Dalembert recorded 11 points, 4 rebounds and 4 blocks.

On August 6, 2015, Dalembert signed with the Dallas Mavericks, returning to the franchise for a second stint. However, he was later waived by the Mavericks on October 24 prior to the start of the regular season. He appeared in four preseason games for the team, but a left leg injury forced him to miss the final three games of the preseason schedule. On December 17, 2015, he signed with Shanxi Zhongyu of the Chinese Basketball Association. He returned to Shanxi for the 2016–17 season.

== National team career ==
After much anticipation, Dalembert became a Canadian citizen on August 7, 2007, and joined the Canadian national team in hopes of qualifying for the Olympics. He made his national team debut during the 2007 FIBA Americas Championship, leading the tournament with 2.4 blocks per game. He also participated in Canada's pre-Olympic qualifying training camp, taking part in games in both Toronto and Hamilton during the 2008 Jack Donohue International Classic, with wins over both Lebanon and New Zealand. However, Dalembert was later dismissed from the team during the World Olympic Qualifying Tournament due to a rift between him and coach Leo Rautins.

== Haiti earthquake ==
Dalembert decided to travel to Haiti to help with relief efforts following the 2010 Haiti earthquake. He also pledged $100,000 to UNICEF.

He won the 2009–10 J. Walter Kennedy Citizenship Award for his contributions to Haitian people after the earthquake. Since the disaster, Dalembert has continued to be involved in the Haitian recovery.

== Career statistics ==
Legend
GP	Games played	GS	Games started	MPG	Minutes per game
FG%	Field goal percentage	3P%	3-point field goal percentage	FT%	Free throw percentage
RPG	Rebounds per game	APG	Assists per game	SPG	Steals per game
BPG	Blocks per game	PPG	Points per game	**Bold**	Career high
*	Led the league

=== Regular season ===
Year	Team	GP	GS	MPG	FG%	3P%	FT%	RPG	APG	SPG	BPG	PPG
2001–02	Philadelphia	34	0	5.2	.440	–	.389	2.0	.1	.2	.4	1.5
2003–04	Philadelphia	**82**	53	26.8	.541	.000	.644	7.6	.3	.5	2.3	8.0
2004–05	Philadelphia	72	60	24.8	.524	–	.601	7.5	.5	**.6**	1.7	8.2
2005–06	Philadelphia	66	52	26.7	.531	.000	.705	8.2	.4	.5	**2.4**	7.3
2006–07	Philadelphia	**82***	**82***	30.9	.541	.000	.746	8.9	**.8**	**.6**	1.9	**10.7**
2007–08	Philadelphia	**82***	**82***	**33.2**	.513	.000	.707	**10.4**	.5	.5	2.3	10.5
2008–09	Philadelphia	**82***	**82***	24.8	.498	.000	.734	8.5	.2	.4	1.8	6.4
2009–10	Philadelphia	**82***	80	25.9	.545	–	.729	9.6	**.8**	.5	1.8	8.1
2010–11	Sacramento	80	46	24.2	.473	.000	.730	8.2	**.8**	.5	1.5	8.1
2011–12	Houston	65	45	22.2	.506	.000	**.796**	7.0	.5	**.6**	1.7	7.5
2012–13	Milwaukee	47	23	16.3	.542	**1.000**	.691	5.9	.4	.4	1.1	6.7
2013–14	Dallas	80	68	20.2	**.568**	.000	.737	6.8	.5	.5	1.2	6.6
2014–15	New York	32	21	17.0	.438	–	.700	5.3	.9	.4	1.3	4.0
Career		886	694	24.4	.521	.083	.706	7.8	.5	.5	1.7	7.7

=== Playoffs ===
Year	Team	GP	GS	MPG	FG%	3P%	FT%	RPG	APG	SPG	BPG	PPG
2005	Philadelphia	5	5	**38.4**	.553	–	.400	**12.8**	.4	.4	1.4	**11.6**
2008	Philadelphia	6	6	32.2	.422	–	**.842**	9.5	**.5**	.3	**1.7**	9.0
2009	Philadelphia	6	6	22.2	**.615**	–	.750	7.8	**.5**	.3	1.5	5.8
2013	Milwaukee	1	0	9.0	.000	–	.250	3.0	.0	**1.0**	.0	1.0
2014	Dallas	**7**	**7**	19.3	.458	–	.667	8.4	.0	.3	1.4	4.6
Career		25	24	26.5	.503	–	.632	9.2	.3	.4	1.4	7.2

=== College ===
Year	Team	GP	GS	MPG	FG%	3P%	FT%	RPG	APG	SPG	BPG	PPG
1999–2000	Seton Hall	30	21	21.4	.503	–	.518	6.0	0.3	0.3	3.6	6.0
2000–01	Seton Hall	29	27	21.4	.565	–	.556	5.7	0.3	0.5	2.1	8.3
Career		59	48	21.4	.537	–	.539	5.8	0.3	0.4	2.8	7.1

== See also ==
- List of National Basketball Association career blocks leaders
- List of Canadians in the National Basketball Association
