= Ed Stefanski =

American basketball player and sports executive

Phoenix Suns
- Title: Front office adviser

Personal information
- Born: Drexel Hill, Pennsylvania, U.S.
- Listed height: 6 ft 1 in (1.85 m)

Career information
- High school: Monsignor Bonner (Drexel Hill, Pennsylvania)
- College: Penn (1973–1976)
- NBA draft: 1976: 10th round, 168th overall pick
- Drafted by: Philadelphia 76ers
- Position: Guard
- Stats at Basketball Reference

Edward Stefanski is an American sports executive. He currently serves as an adviser for the Phoenix Suns of the National Basketball Association (NBA).

== Career ==
=== Playing career ===
Stefanski grew up in Delaware County, Pennsylvania, attending St. Bernadette's Grade school in Drexel Hill, Pennsylvania as the star player on both the football and basketball teams. He attended Monsignor Bonner High School in Upper Darby Township, Pennsylvania where he was a "Wall-of Fame" basketball standout at Bonner and then went on to play college basketball, as 'the shot', at the University of Pennsylvania. Stefanski was a 10th round selection of the Philadelphia 76ers in the 1976 NBA draft.

=== Executive career ===
In 2014, Stefanski was hired as vice president of player personnel for the Memphis Grizzlies of the National Basketball Association (NBA). Prior to joining the Grizzlies, Stefanski served as executive vice president of basketball operations for the Toronto Raptors from 2011 to 2013, and general manager of the Philadelphia 76ers from 2007 to 2011. He was dismissed by new 76ers ownership led by Josh Harris. Stefanski previously worked for the New Jersey Nets from 1999 to 2007 as director of scouting, senior vice president of basketball operations, and general manager.

On May 24, 2018, Stefanski was named senior adviser to the owner of the Detroit Pistons. In 2020, Stefanski received one 3rd place vote for NBA Executive of the Year.

On October 4, 2025, Stefanski was hired to serve as a front office adviser for the Phoenix Suns.

== Personal life ==
Stefanski is a resident of Avalon, New Jersey. He is the father of NFL head coach Kevin Stefanski.

== See also ==
- List of National Basketball Association team presidents
