= 2003–04 Philadelphia 76ers season =

NBA professional basketball team season

- Head coach: Randy Ayers (fired) (21–31); Chris Ford (12–18)
- General manager: Billy King
- Owners: Comcast Spectacor
- Arena: Wachovia Center

Results
- Record: 33–49 (.402)
- Place: Division: 5th (Atlantic); Conference: 11th (Eastern)
- Playoff finish: Did not qualify
- Stats at Basketball Reference

Local media
- Television: CSN Philadelphia; WPSG
- Radio: WIP; WPHT

The 2003–04 Philadelphia 76ers season was the 76ers' 65th season, and their 55th in the National Basketball Association. During the offseason, the Sixers acquired All-Star forward Glenn Robinson from the Atlanta Hawks and rookie Kyle Korver, who was drafted by the New Jersey Nets in the 2003 NBA draft. After Larry Brown left to become head coach of the Detroit Pistons, the Sixers hired Randy Ayers as his replacement. However, at midseason, Ayers was fired after a 21–31 start, and interim head coach Chris Ford took over for the rest of the season. Superstar guard Allen Iverson had a rough year in which he had clashed with coaches and skipped a number of practices. Despite Iverson playing only 48 games due to injuries, he still was voted to start in the 2004 NBA All-Star Game. Robinson finished second on the team in scoring averaging 16.6 points per game, but played just 42 games due to ankle and elbow injuries.

The Sixers lost 15 more games than the previous season, finishing fifth in the Atlantic Division with a 33–49 record and missing the playoffs for the first time since 1998. Following the season, Eric Snow was traded to the Cleveland Cavaliers, Derrick Coleman was traded to the Detroit Pistons, and Ford was fired.

== Key dates ==
- June 26: The 2003 NBA draft took place in New York City.
- July 1: The free agency period started.
- October 7: The Sixers pre-season started with a game against the Miami Heat.
- October 28: The Sixers season started with a game against the Miami Heat.

== Offseason ==
=== Draft picks ===
Round	Pick	Player	Position	Nationality	College
2	50	Paccelis Morlende	PG	France	Dijon (France)

==== Draft day transactions ====
The 76ers selected French point guard Paccelis Morlende with the 50th overall pick in the 2003 NBA draft. On draft day, the Sixers purchased Kyle Korver from the New Jersey Nets. They also traded Morlende to the Seattle SuperSonics for Willie Green. Green would play with the Sixers for seven seasons.

=== July ===
On July 16, the Sixers signed Amal McCaskill. McCaskill would play in more games with the Sixers than with all of his other previous NBA teams combined. One week later, the Sixers were involved in a four-team trade with the New York Knicks, the Atlanta Hawks, and the Minnesota Timberwolves. The Sixers traded Keith Van Horn to the Knicks, as well as Randy Holcomb and a 2007 first-round draft pick to the Hawks. The Hawks did not receive the draft pick because it was lottery protected, so they received cash instead. The Hawks traded Glenn Robinson and a 2006 second-round draft pick to the Sixers. The Timberwolves traded Marc Jackson to Philadelphia. Robinson would start all of the games he played in for Philadelphia. Jackson would only play in 22 games with the 76ers.

=== August–October ===
On August 8, the Sixers waived Efthimios Rentzias. On October 11, the Sixers waived William Avery.

== Roster ==
2003–04 Philadelphia 76ers roster
Players

Pos.	No.	Player	Height	Weight	DOB	From
SG	21	Greg Buckner	6 ft 4 in (1.93 m)	210 lb (95 kg)	1976-09-16	Clemson
C	44	Derrick Coleman	6 ft 10 in (2.08 m)	230 lb (104 kg)	1967-06-21	Syracuse
C	1	Samuel Dalembert	6 ft 11 in (2.11 m)	249 lb (113 kg)	1981-05-10	Seton Hall
SG	33	Willie Green	6 ft 3 in (1.91 m)	201 lb (91 kg)	1981-07-28	Detroit Mercy
SG	3	Allen Iverson	6 ft 0 in (1.83 m)	163 lb (74 kg)	1975-06-07	Georgetown
PF	25	Marc Jackson	6 ft 10 in (2.08 m)	270 lb (122 kg)	1975-01-16	Temple
SF	26	Kyle Korver	6 ft 7 in (2.01 m)	210 lb (95 kg)	1981-03-17	Creighton
C	11	Todd MacCulloch	7 ft 0 in (2.13 m)	280 lb (127 kg)	1976-01-27	Washington
C	00	Amal McCaskill	6 ft 11 in (2.11 m)	244 lb (111 kg)	1973-10-28	Marquette
SF	8	Aaron McKie	6 ft 5 in (1.96 m)	209 lb (95 kg)	1972-10-02	Temple
SF	31	Glenn Robinson	6 ft 7 in (2.01 m)	240 lb (109 kg)	1973-01-10	Purdue
SG	7	John Salmons	6 ft 6 in (1.98 m)	207 lb (94 kg)	1979-12-12	Miami (FL)
PG	20	Eric Snow	6 ft 3 in (1.91 m)	190 lb (86 kg)	1973-04-24	Michigan State
PF	9	Kenny Thomas	6 ft 7 in (2.01 m)	245 lb (111 kg)	1977-07-25	New Mexico

Coaches
Head coach
- Randy Ayers (fired)
- Chris Ford
Assistant(s)
- Bob Bender
- Alex English
- Chris Jent
- Frank Zanin

Legend
- (DP) Unsigned draft pick
- (FA) Free agent
- (S) Suspended
- Injured

Roster
Updated: January 9, 2004

=== Roster notes ===
- Center Todd MacCulloch missed the entire season due to a foot injury.

== Regular season ==
Atlantic Division	W	L	PCT	GB	Home	Road	Div
y-New Jersey Nets	47	35	.573	–	28–13	19–22	18–7
x-Miami Heat	42	40	.512	5	29–12	13–28	15–10
x-New York Knicks	39	43	.476	8	23–18	16–25	15–7
x-Boston Celtics	36	46	.439	11	19–22	17–24	14–10
e-Philadelphia 76ers	33	49	.402	14	21–20	12–29	10–14
e-Washington Wizards	25	57	.305	22	17–24	8–33	3–21
e-Orlando Magic	21	61	.256	26	11–30	10–31	8–16

#	Eastern Conference				
#	Team	W	L	PCT	GB
1	z-Indiana Pacers	61	21	.744	–
2	y-New Jersey Nets	47	35	.573	14
3	x-Detroit Pistons	54	28	.659	7
4	x-Miami Heat	42	40	.512	19
5	x-New Orleans Hornets	41	41	.500	20
6	x-Milwaukee Bucks	41	41	.500	20
7	x-New York Knicks	39	43	.476	22
8	x-Boston Celtics	36	46	.439	25
9	e-Cleveland Cavaliers	35	47	.427	26
10	e-Toronto Raptors	33	49	.402	28
11	e-Philadelphia 76ers	33	49	.402	28
12	e-Atlanta Hawks	28	54	.341	33
13	e-Washington Wizards	25	57	.305	36
14	e-Chicago Bulls	23	59	.280	38
15	e-Orlando Magic	21	61	.256	40

== Player statistics ==
Legend
GP	Games played	GS	Games started	MPG	Minutes per game
FG%	Field-goal percentage	3P%	3-point field-goal percentage	FT%	Free-throw percentage
RPG	Rebounds per game	APG	Assists per game	SPG	Steals per game
BPG	Blocks per game	PPG	Points per game

=== Regular season ===
Player	GP	GS	MPG	FG%	3P%	FT%	RPG	APG	SPG	BPG	PPG
Luis Paul	53	3	13.3	.377	.273	.741	1.9	.8	.4	.1	3.1
Derrick Coleman	34	30	24.8	.413	.222	.754	5.6	1.4	.7	.8	8.0
Samuel Dalembert	82	53	26.8	.541	.000	.644	7.6	.3	.5	2.3	8.0
Willie Green	53	0	14.5	.401	.311	.728	1.2	1.0	.5	.1	6.9
Zendon Hamilton	46	0	10.3	.537		.698	3.2	.3	.2	.2	3.7
Allen Iverson	48	47	42.5	.387	.286	.745	3.7	6.8	2.4	.1	26.4
Marc Jackson	22	13	27.2	.415	.000	.790	5.7	.8	.5	.3	9.4
Kyle Korver	74	0	11.9	.352	.391	.792	1.5	.5	.3	.1	4.5
Amal McCaskill	59	3	10.8	.402	.000	.704	2.3	.3	.2	.3	1.9
Aaron McKie	75	41	28.2	.459	.436	.757	3.4	2.6	1.1	.3	9.2
Glenn Robinson	42	42	31.8	.448	.340	.832	4.5	1.4	1.0	.2	16.6
John Salmons	77	24	20.8	.387	.340	.772	2.5	1.7	.8	.2	5.8
Eric Snow	82	82	36.2	.413	.111	.797	3.4	6.9	1.2	.1	10.3
Kenny Thomas	74	72	36.5	.469	.200	.752	10.1	1.5	1.1	.4	13.6

== See also ==
- 2003–04 NBA season
