= Hong Kong Flying Dragons =

Chinese Basketball Association team

The Hong Kong Flying Dragons (香港飛龍) were a short-lived team in the Chinese Basketball Association, based in Shenzhen, China.

They entered the league for the 2002–2003 season, but finished last and were destined to be relegated to the "B" division. In the "B" division, they would have had the opportunity to compete for promotion back to the CBA, but in the event, the team did not participate in "B" division play but simply folded.

The team was also known for acquiring the services of eventual second round pick from the 2003 NBA draft Xue Yuyang. Xue was drafted by the Dallas Mavericks and traded to the Denver Nuggets as the penultimate pick in that draft, but he'd never play in the NBA. He was considered the first Chinese player drafted to not play in the NBA at all.
