= Willie Green =

American basketball player and coach (born 1981)

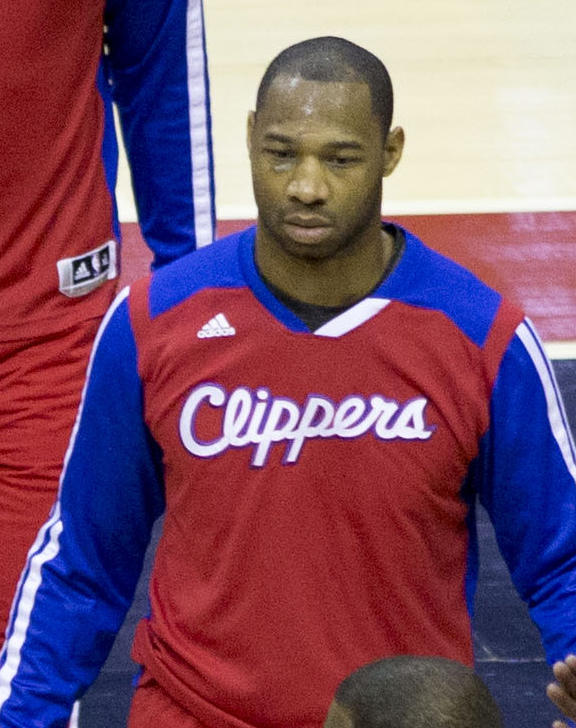
- Green with the Los Angeles Clippers in 2013

Dallas Mavericks
- Title: Lead assistant
- League: NBA

Personal information
- Born: July 28, 1981 (age 45) Detroit, Michigan, U.S.
- Listed height: 6 ft 3 in (1.91 m)
- Listed weight: 205 lb (93 kg)

Career information
- High school: Cooley (Detroit, Michigan)
- College: Detroit Mercy (1999–2003)
- NBA draft: 2003: 2nd round, 41st overall pick
- Drafted by: Seattle SuperSonics
- Playing career: 2003–2015
- Position: Shooting guard
- Number: 33, 34
- Coaching career: 2016–present

Career history

Playing
- 2003–2010: Philadelphia 76ers
- 2010–2011: New Orleans Hornets
- 2011–2012: Atlanta Hawks
- 2012–2014: Los Angeles Clippers
- 2014–2015: Orlando Magic

Coaching
- 2016–2019: Golden State Warriors (assistant)
- 2019–2021: Phoenix Suns (assistant)
- 2021–2026: New Orleans Pelicans
- 2026–present: Dallas Mavericks (lead assistant)

Career highlights
- As player: Horizon League Player of the Year (2003); First-team All-Horizon League (2003); Second-team All-Horizon League (2001); No. 34 retired by Detroit Mercy Titans; As assistant coach: 2× NBA champion (2017, 2018)
- Stats at NBA.com
- Stats at Basketball Reference

William Julius Green (born July 28, 1981) is an American professional basketball coach and former player who currently is an assistant coach for the Dallas Mavericks of the National Basketball Association (NBA). He played professionally in the NBA with the Philadelphia 76ers, New Orleans Hornets, Atlanta Hawks, Los Angeles Clippers, and Orlando Magic. He was selected in the second round (41st pick overall) of the 2003 NBA draft by the Seattle SuperSonics and later acquired by the Philadelphia 76ers from Seattle in a draft-night trade for the draft rights to Paccelis Morlende (50th pick overall) and cash considerations.

== Professional career ==
=== Philadelphia 76ers (2003–2010) ===
Green was a 1999 graduate of Cooley High School; after a college career at the University of Detroit Mercy, he was selected by the Seattle SuperSonics in the second round (41st overall) of the 2003 NBA draft. He was traded the same day to the Philadelphia 76ers for the draft rights to Paccelis Morlende and cash considerations.

Green was due to re-sign with the Sixers during the 2005 offseason, but suffered an injury the day of the contract signing, which put the contract in a state of limbo. On March 23, 2006, he officially re-signed with the Sixers, and on April 4, 2006, he was activated and played 11 minutes, scoring 9 points on 4-for-6 shooting in a loss to the Cleveland Cavaliers.

Green, in the final Sixers game of the 2006–07 season, had a career-high 37 points against the Toronto Raptors on April 4, 2007.

Green beat out Rodney Carney for the Sixers starting shooting guard position. During the 2007–08 NBA season, Green had career highs in games played (74, all of them as a starter), minutes played (26.6), field goal percentage (.436), rebounds (2.5), assists (2.0), and points (12.4).

=== New Orleans Hornets (2010–2011) ===
Green was traded to New Orleans with forward Jason Smith in exchange for forward Darius Songaila and rookie forward Craig Brackins on September 23, 2010.

=== Atlanta Hawks (2011–2012) ===
On December 22, 2011, Green signed with the Atlanta Hawks.

=== Los Angeles Clippers (2012–2014) ===
On July 30, 2012, Green was signed-and-traded to the Los Angeles Clippers for the rights to Sofoklis Schortsanitis.

On June 29, 2014, he was waived by the Clippers.

=== Orlando Magic (2014–2015) ===
On June 30, 2014, Green was claimed off waivers by the Orlando Magic.

== Coaching career ==
=== Assistant coach (2016–2021) ===
On August 9, 2016, Green was hired by the Golden State Warriors coaching staff as an assistant coach. He won his first championship when the Warriors defeated the Cleveland Cavaliers in five games of the 2017 NBA Finals. Green won his second straight championship when the Warriors defeated the Cavaliers in four games of the 2018 NBA Finals.

On June 26, 2019, he was hired as an assistant coach for the Phoenix Suns.

=== New Orleans Pelicans (2021–2025) ===
On July 22, 2021, Green was named head coach of the New Orleans Pelicans. After starting the season 1–12, Green led the Pelicans to a 36–46 record, finishing ninth in the Western Conference and securing a spot in the NBA play-in tournament. The Pelicans would go on to beat the San Antonio Spurs and the Los Angeles Clippers en route to their first playoff berth since the 2017–18 season. Green and the Pelicans would ultimately fall to the Phoenix Suns, Green's former team, in six games in the First Round.

Green and the Pelicans started the 2022–23 season off strong, tied with the Denver Nuggets for first place in the Western Conference at the start of 2023 with a 23–12 record. However, injuries to multiple players, including Zion Williamson and Brandon Ingram, saw the team regress significantly during the second half of the season. The Pelicans finished ninth in the Western Conference, qualifying for the play-in tournament for the second consecutive season. Their season ended with a 123–118 loss to the Oklahoma City Thunder on April 12, 2023. Despite their struggles, Green and the Pelicans finished the regular season with a 42–40 record, marking Green's first winning season as a head coach.

After a 2–10 start to the 2025–26 season, placing New Orleans at the bottom of the Western Conference, Green was fired on November 15, 2025.

=== Dallas Mavericks (2026–present) ===
On July 2, 2026, Green was hired by the Dallas Mavericks as the lead assistant coach under head coach Dusty May.

== Awards ==
- Midwestern Collegiate Conference All-Newcomer Team: 2000
- Second Team All-Midwestern Collegiate Conference: 2001
- Horizon League Scoring Leader: 2003
- Horizon League All-Tournament Team: 2003
- All-Horizon First Team: 2003
- Horizon League Player of the Year: 2003
- Honorable Mention All-America by AP: 2003
- Portsmouth Invitational All-Tournament Team: 2003

== Career statistics ==
Legend
GP	Games played	GS	Games started	MPG	Minutes per game
FG%	Field goal percentage	3P%	3-point field goal percentage	FT%	Free throw percentage
RPG	Rebounds per game	APG	Assists per game	SPG	Steals per game
BPG	Blocks per game	PPG	Points per game	**Bold**	Career high

=== Regular season ===
Year	Team	GP	GS	MPG	FG%	3P%	FT%	RPG	APG	SPG	BPG	PPG
2003–04	Philadelphia	53	0	14.5	.401	.311	.728	1.2	1.0	.5	.1	6.9
2004–05	Philadelphia	57	21	18.7	.366	.286	.776	2.3	1.8	.6	.1	7.7
2005–06	Philadelphia	10	2	15.3	.424	**.526**	.800	1.5	.5	.2	.0	7.0
2006–07	Philadelphia	74	36	24.9	.411	.325	.667	2.1	1.5	**.8**	.1	11.3
2007–08	Philadelphia	74	**74**	**26.6**	.436	.285	.757	**2.5**	2.0	.7	**.3**	**12.4**
2008–09	Philadelphia	**81**	60	22.6	.435	.317	.729	1.6	2.0	.7	.2	8.5
2009–10	Philadelphia	73	18	21.3	.457	.346	.833	1.8	**2.1**	.4	.2	8.7
2010–11	New Orleans	77	13	21.7	.443	.348	.780	2.1	1.0	.5	.2	8.7
2011–12	Atlanta	53	2	17.4	**.471**	.442	**.857**	1.5	.8	.4	.1	7.6
2012–13	L.A. Clippers	72	60	16.5	.461	.428	.719	1.3	.8	.4	.2	6.3
2013–14	L.A. Clippers	55	9	15.8	.376	.339	.824	1.4	.9	.4	.2	5.0
2014–15	Orlando	52	2	18.3	.386	.347	.824	1.5	1.3	.5	.1	5.9
Career		731	297	20.2	.425	.346	.765	1.8	1.4	.5	.1	8.3

=== Playoffs ===
Year	Team	GP	GS	MPG	FG%	3P%	FT%	RPG	APG	SPG	BPG	PPG
2005	Philadelphia	5	0	12.6	.444	.222	.900	**1.8**	.6	.2	.0	5.4
2008	Philadelphia	**6**	**6**	23.7	.431	.200	.643	1.3	**2.0**	**.8**	**.7**	**9.0**
2009	Philadelphia	**6**	**6**	**24.7**	.412	**.364**	.333	1.0	1.2	.0	.2	7.8
2011	New Orleans	**6**	0	14.0	.389	.222	.571	.8	.7	.3	.0	5.7
2012	Atlanta	5	0	12.6	.462	.250	.000	1.6	.6	.0	.0	2.6
2013	L.A. Clippers	3	0	6.7	**.667**	.000	**1.000**	1.0	.7	.3	.0	2.0
2014	L.A. Clippers	5	0	3.8	.200	.250	**1.000**	1.4	.2	.6	.0	1.0
Career		36	12	15.0	.418	.256	.711	1.3	.9	.3	.1	5.2

== Head coaching record ==
Legend
Regular season	G	Games coached	W	Games won	L	Games lost	W–L %	Win–loss %
Playoffs	PG	Playoff games	PW	Playoff wins	PL	Playoff losses	PW–L %	Playoff win–loss %

Team	Year	G	W	L	W–L%	Finish	PG	PW	PL	PW–L%	Result
New Orleans	2021–22	82	36	46	.439	3rd in Southwest	6	2	4	.333	Lost in first round
New Orleans	2022–23	82	42	40	.512	2nd in Southwest	—	—	—	—	Missed playoffs
New Orleans	2023–24	82	49	33	.598	2nd in Southwest	4	0	4	.000	Lost in first round
New Orleans	2024–25	82	21	61	.256	5th in Southwest	—	—	—	—	Missed playoffs
New Orleans	2025–26	12	2	10	.167	(fired)	—	—	—	—	—
Career		340	150	190	.441		10	2	8	.200	

== See also ==
- Disappearance of Toni Sharpless, 2009 missing persons case of a woman not seen since shortly after she left Green's house at the time; he was cleared of any involvement
