= Xue Yuyang =

Chinese basketball player (born 1982)

Personal information
- Born: 4 October 1982 (age 44) Jiaozuo, Henan, China
- Listed height: 7 ft 0 in (2.13 m)
- Listed weight: 265 lb (120 kg)

Career information
- NBA draft: 2003: 2nd round, 57th overall pick
- Drafted by: Dallas Mavericks
- Playing career: 2001–2017
- Position: Power forward / center

Career history
- 2001–2003: Jilin Northeast Tigers
- 2003: Hong Kong Flying Dragons
- 2003–2011: Xinjiang Flying Tigers
- 2011–2014: Qingdao DoubleStar
- 2014–2017: Henan Shedianlaojiu
- Stats at Basketball Reference

Xue Yuyang (Chinese: 薛玉洋; pinyin: Xuē Yùyáng; born October 4, 1982) is a Chinese retired professional basketball player. Xue was selected 57th overall in the 2003 NBA draft by the Dallas Mavericks, who traded the pick to the Denver Nuggets. Xue is the only NBA player drafted whose surname begins with the letter X.

== Professional career ==
=== NBA draft ===
In 2003, Xue entered the National Basketball Association Draft, without official permission, and the Chinese authorities refused to let him play in the United States. He was selected 57th overall by the Dallas Mavericks, who traded the pick to the Denver Nuggets. However, as he had not received the necessary clearance from the Chinese Basketball Association, Denver did not sign him to an NBA contract.

=== CBA career ===
Xue began his career with Jilin Northeast Tigers where he played until the end of the 2002–2003 season, entering and being selected on the NBA draft. Afterwards he was signed by the Hong Kong Flying Dragons of the CBA, however, after being relegated the team folded, turning him into a free agent, so he signed with the Xinjiang Flying Tigers where he stayed until 2011 where he signed with Qingdao DoubleStar where he played until the end of the 2013–2014 season.

=== Move to the NBL ===
On August 24, 2014, he signed with Henan Shedianlaojiu for the rest of the season.

=== Moving on to Europe ===
In 2016, Xue would decide to branch out into Europe with the BC Pasvalio Pieno Zvaigzde in Lithuania. He would become the second Chinese player to play in European nations, with the first being Shang Ping playing for the Panathinaikos B.C. in the Greek Basket League from 2013 to 2014.
