= 2003 NBA draft =

Basketball player selection

General information
- Sport: Basketball
- Date: June 26, 2003
- Location: The Theater at Madison Square Garden (New York City, New York)
- Network: ESPN

Overview
- 58 total selections in 2 rounds
- League: NBA
- First selection: LeBron James (Cleveland Cavaliers)
- Hall of Famers: 3: SF Carmelo Anthony; PF Chris Bosh; SG Dwyane Wade

The 2003 NBA draft was held on June 26, 2003, at The Theater at Madison Square Garden in New York City, New York. The NBA announced that 41 college and high school players and a record 31 international players had filed as early-entry candidates for the 2003 NBA draft. The Cleveland Cavaliers, who had a 22.50 percent probability of obtaining the first selection, won the NBA draft lottery on May 22. Cleveland chairman Gordon Gund said afterward his team intended to select LeBron James, and they did. The Detroit Pistons and the Denver Nuggets were second and third, respectively. This draft was the first draft to be aired on ESPN after they picked up the license from TNT.

The 2003 draftees represented one of the deepest talent pools in NBA history. The draft contained 15 players who combined for 26 championships. Four of the top five picks were NBA All-Stars and "Redeem Team" Olympic Gold Medalists: Carmelo Anthony, Chris Bosh, Dwyane Wade, and James, and three of those top five—James, Wade, and Bosh—were members of the Miami Heat Big Three, while the only remaining top five pick—Darko Miličić—never played at the level expected of him in the NBA and is widely considered a draft bust. Nine of the players drafted were named All-Stars at least once. As of 2026, James is the last remaining active player from this draft class, having held this distinction since Anthony's retirement in 2023.

== Overview ==
Four of the top five picks of the 2003 draft became NBA All-Stars and "Redeem Team" Olympic Gold Medalists: Carmelo Anthony, Chris Bosh, Dwyane Wade, and LeBron James, while three of those top 5—James, Wade, and Bosh—were each selected as the 1st, 4th, and 5th picks in the draft respectively, and became scoring leaders for their respective franchises over their first seven seasons before they all formed a superteam together for the Miami Heat named the Big Three, also known as the Heatles, from the 2010–11 season to the 2013–14 season. During the trio's four seasons together, the Heat advanced to the NBA Finals each year and won two NBA championships. James won NBA Most Valuable Player awards in 2012 and 2013 and was named to the All-NBA First Team in all four seasons, while Wade was All-NBA Second Team in 2011 and All-NBA Third Team in 2012 and 2013. All three of Bosh, Wade, and James were NBA All-Stars during all four seasons together. Meanwhile, Darko Miličić was selected 2nd overall by the Detroit Pistons; however, he never played at the level expected of him in the NBA and is widely considered a draft bust. Nine players have participated in an All-Star Game. Dwyane Wade was named NBA Finals MVP in 2006 and won NBA championships with the Miami Heat in 2006, 2012 and 2013, as well as the NBA All Star Game MVP in 2010. Boris Diaw won the Most Improved Player Award in 2006, Jason Kapono won the three point contest in back-to-back years in 2007 and 2008, James Jones won the three point contest in 2011, Leandro Barbosa won the Sixth Man Award in 2007, Kyle Korver set the NBA record for three point shooting percentage in 2010 (53.6%), and in the 2009, 2010, 2012, and 2013 seasons, LeBron James won the NBA Most Valuable Player Award, and the NBA Finals MVP in 2012, 2013, 2016, and 2020. Carmelo Anthony won the 2013 NBA scoring title and was the only player in NBA history to win at least three Olympic gold medals until Kevin Durant won his third one in 2020. Zaza Pachulia and David West won NBA championships with the Golden State Warriors in 2017 and 2018. Matt Bonner won NBA championships with the San Antonio Spurs in 2007 and 2014. Dahntay Jones and Mo Williams won the NBA championship in 2016 with the Cleveland Cavaliers. Luke Walton won three NBA championships, two as a player with the Los Angeles Lakers in 2009 and 2010 and one as an assistant coach with the Warriors in 2015. Chris Bosh left the Toronto Raptors in 2010 as its all-time leader in points, rebounds, blocks, double doubles, free throws made and attempted, and minutes played; he went on to win championships with the Miami Heat in 2012 and 2013.

The 2003 draft class has drawn comparisons to the 1984 and 1996 NBA draft classes but is also known for the Detroit Pistons' selection of Darko Miličić with the second overall pick over other prospects who went on to have much more success in the league. As of 2026, LeBron James is the only remaining active player from the 2003 draft class, having held this distinction since Anthony's retirement in 2023.

Eleven of the players selected in this draft never played in an NBA game throughout their professional basketball careers. Two of those players were the sole selection of the draft by their respective teams: Malick Badiane (Houston's only pick) and Paccelis Morlende (Philadelphia's only pick).

== Draft selections ==
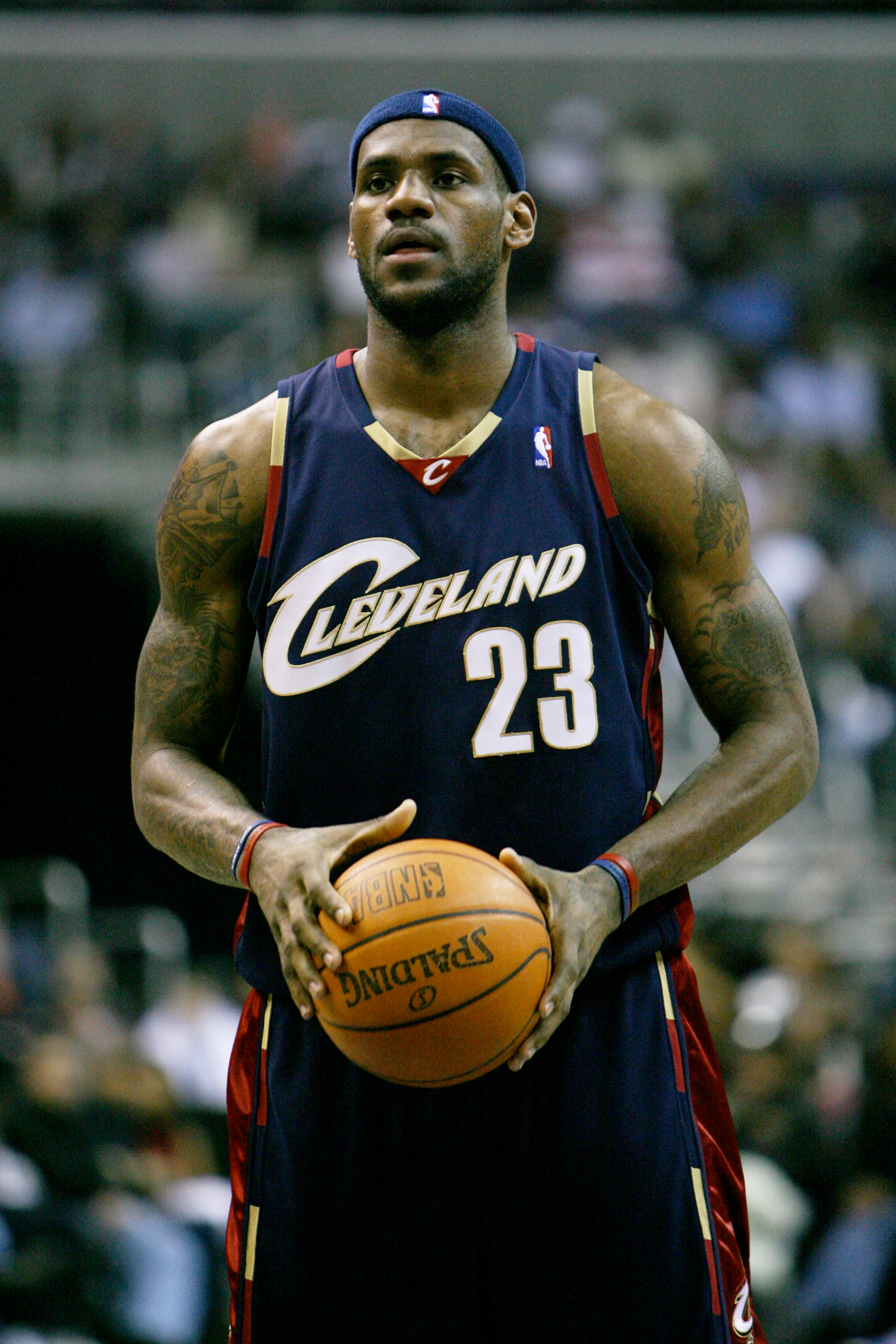
LeBron James was one of the most anticipated first overall draft picks in the history of any sport. He is the second high school draftee to be a first overall pick, the first being Kwame Brown in 2001, and was followed by Dwight Howard in 2004.

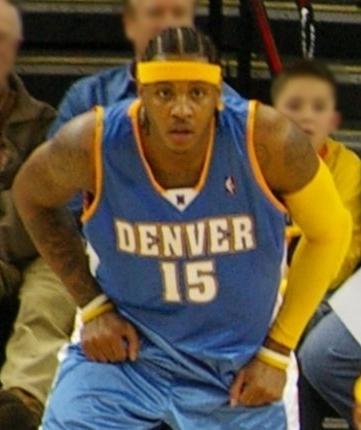
Carmelo Anthony was selected 3rd overall by the Denver Nuggets.

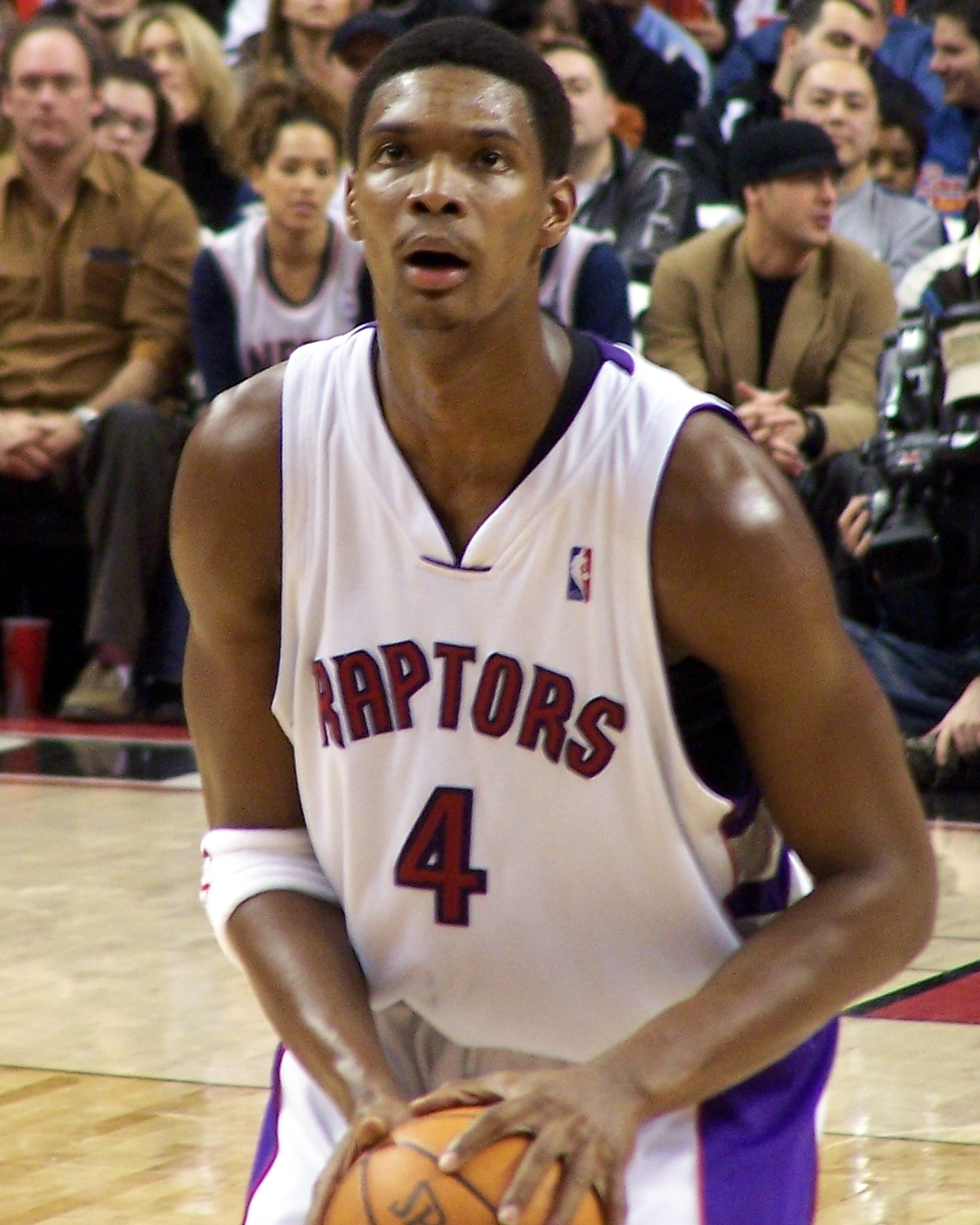
Chris Bosh, selected 4th overall by the Toronto Raptors, was the first member of the draft class to be elected to the Naismith Memorial Basketball Hall of Fame.

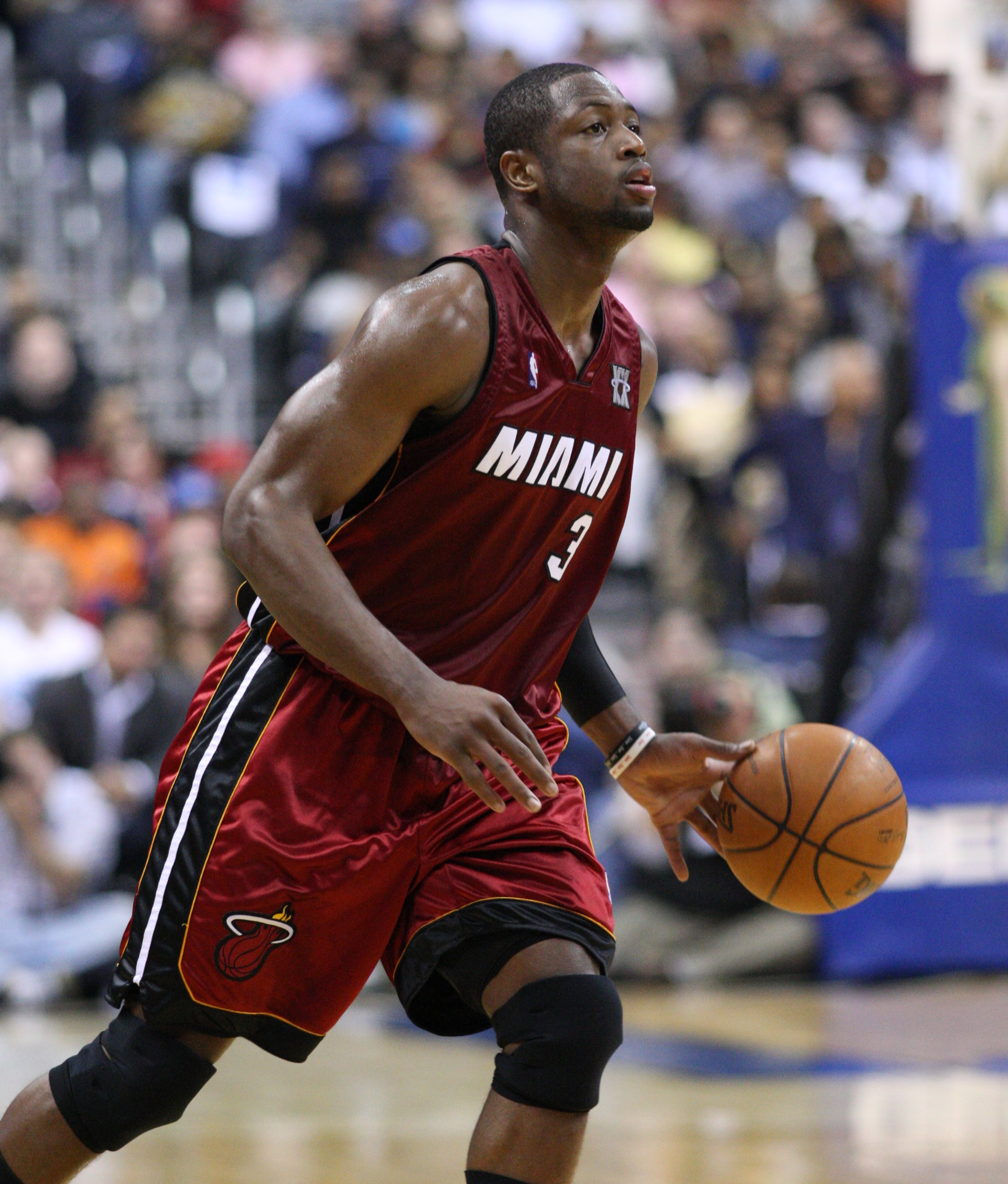
Dwyane Wade was selected 5th overall by the Miami Heat.

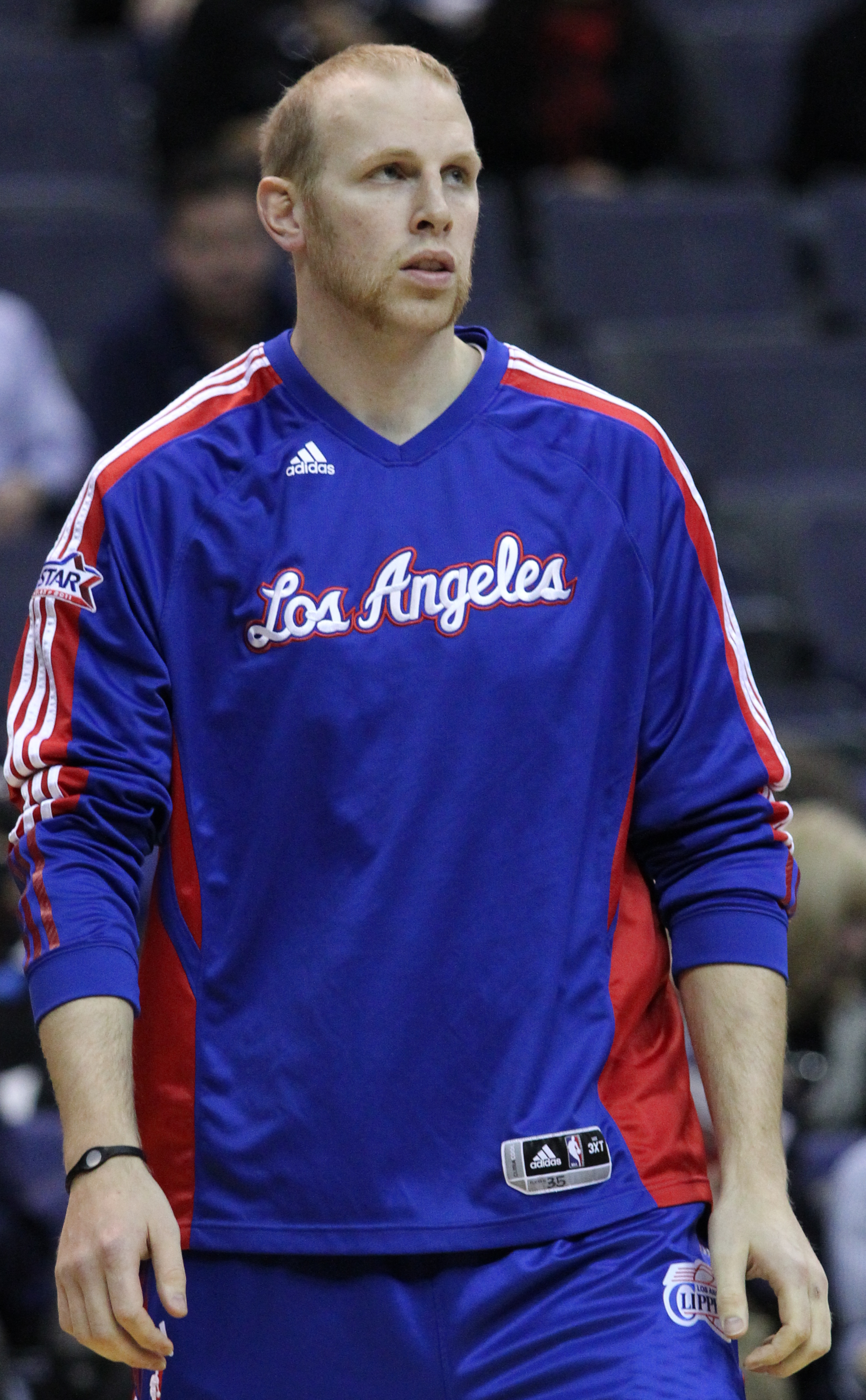
Chris Kaman was selected 6th overall by the Los Angeles Clippers.

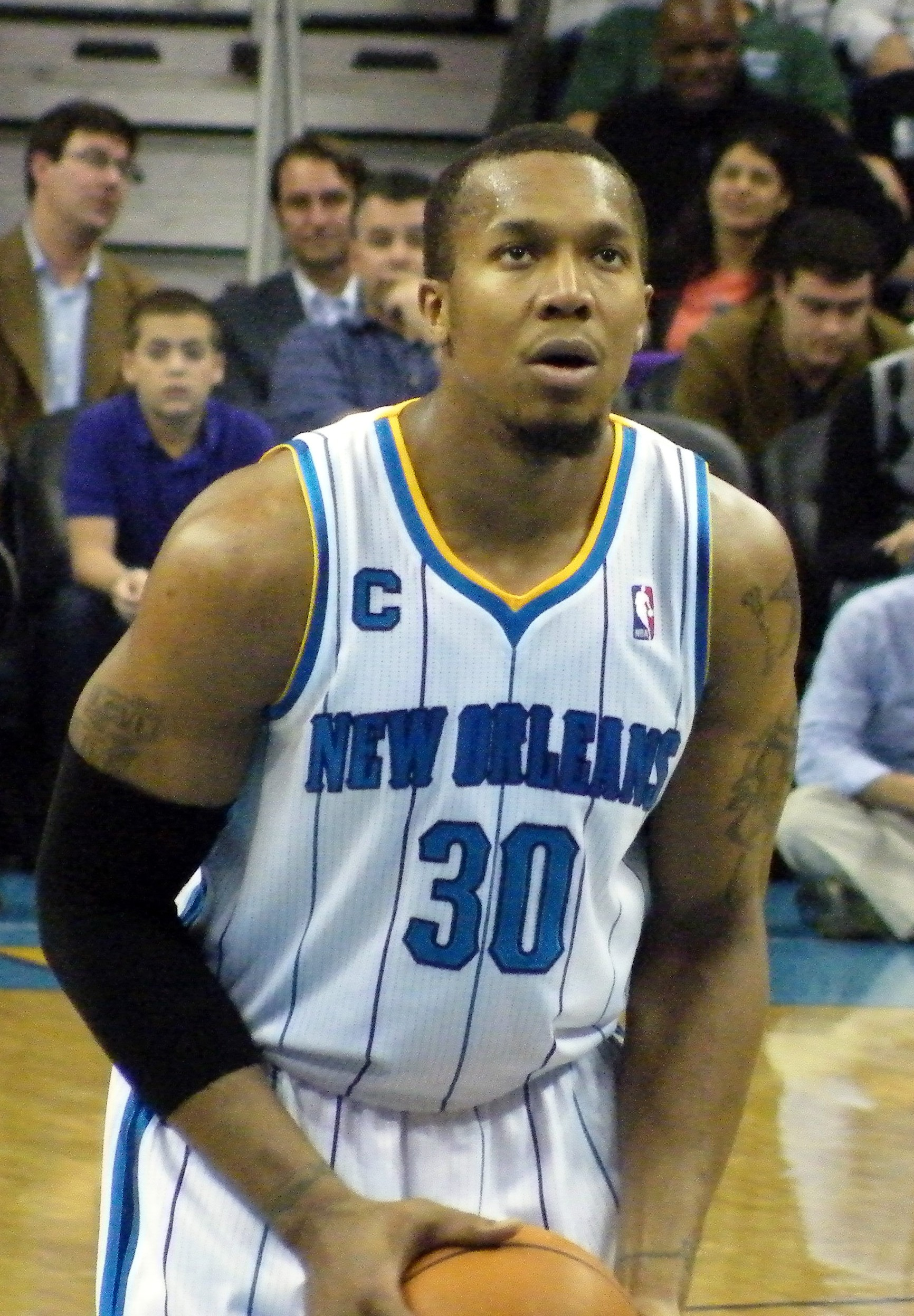
David West was selected 18th overall by the New Orleans Hornets.

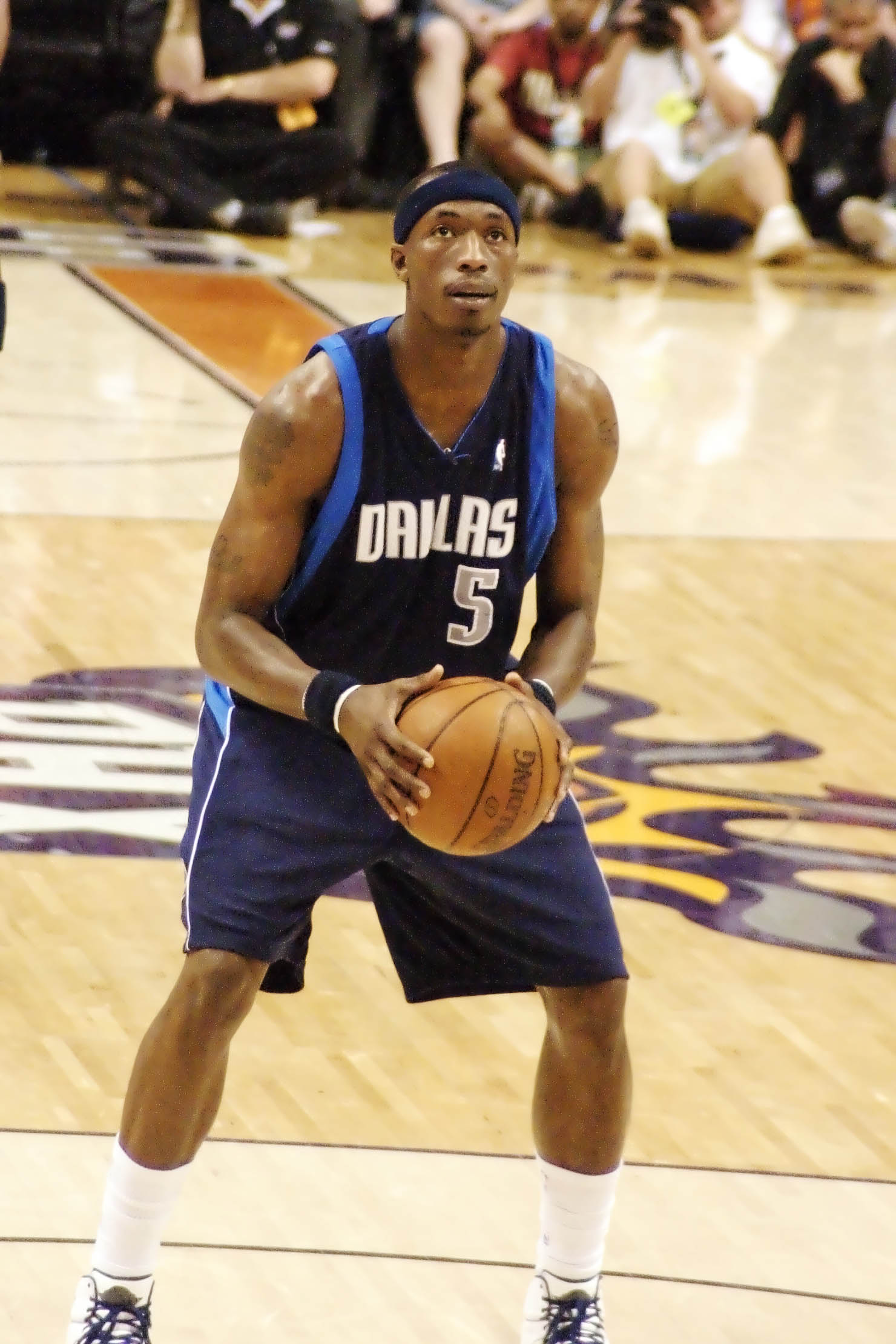
Josh Howard was selected 29th overall by the Dallas Mavericks.

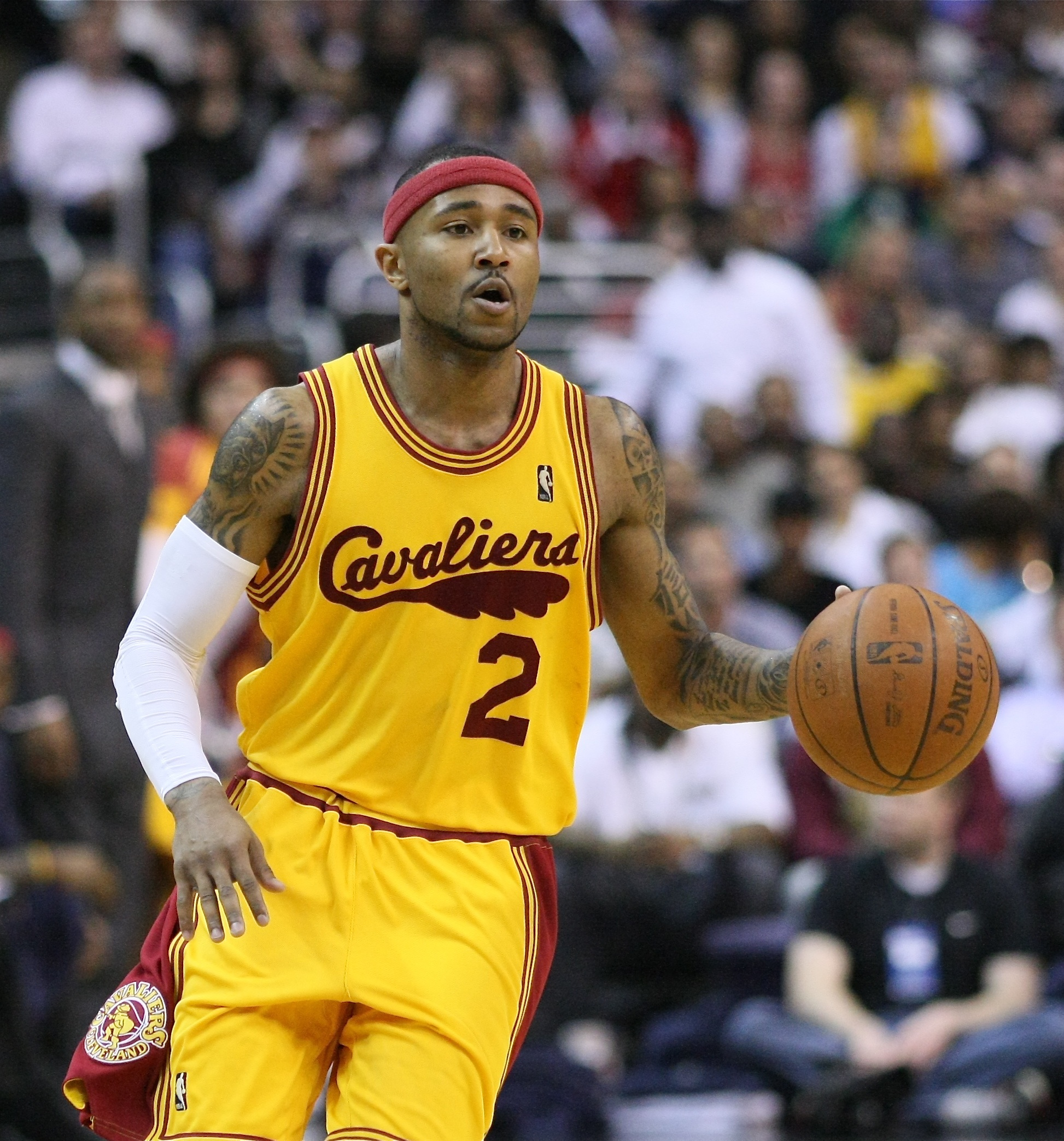
Mo Williams was selected 47th overall by the Utah Jazz.

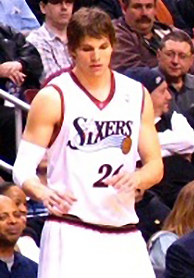
Kyle Korver was selected 51st overall by the New Jersey Nets (traded to the Philadelphia 76ers).

PG	Point guard	SG	Shooting guard	SF	Small forward	PF	Power forward	C	Center

^	Denotes player who has been inducted to the Naismith Memorial Basketball Hall of Fame
*	Denotes player who has been selected for at least one All-Star Game and All-NBA Team
^{+}	Denotes player who has been selected for at least one All-Star Game
^{#}	Denotes player who has never appeared in an NBA regular-season or playoff game
^{~}	Denotes player who has been selected as Rookie of the Year

Round	Pick	Player	Position	Nationality (Note: Nationality indicates the player's national team or representative nationality. If a player has not competed at the international level, then the nationality indicates the national team which the player is eligible to represent according to FIBA rules.)	Team	School/club team
1	1	LeBron James*^{~}	SF/PF	United States	Cleveland Cavaliers	St. Vincent–St. Mary HS (Akron, Ohio)
1	2	Darko Miličić	C	Serbia and Montenegro	Detroit Pistons (from Memphis)	Hemofarm Vršac (Serbia and Montenegro)
1	3	Carmelo Anthony^	SF/PF	United States	Denver Nuggets	Syracuse (Fr.)
1	4	Chris Bosh^	PF/C	United States	Toronto Raptors	Georgia Tech (Fr.)
1	5	Dwyane Wade^	SG	United States	Miami Heat	Marquette (Jr.)
1	6	Chris Kaman^{+}	C	United States	Los Angeles Clippers	Central Michigan (Jr.)
1	7	Kirk Hinrich	PG	United States	Chicago Bulls	Kansas (Sr.)
1	8	T. J. Ford	PG	United States	Milwaukee Bucks (from Atlanta)	Texas (So.)
1	9	Michael Sweetney	PF	United States	New York Knicks	Georgetown (Jr.)
1	10	Jarvis Hayes	F/G	United States	Washington Wizards	Georgia (Jr.)
1	11	Mickaël Piétrus	G/F	France	Golden State Warriors	Pau-Orthez (France)
1	12	Nick Collison	PF	United States	Seattle SuperSonics	Kansas (Sr.)
1	13	Marcus Banks	PG	United States	Memphis Grizzlies (from Houston, traded to Boston)	UNLV (Sr)
1	14	Luke Ridnour	PG	United States	Seattle SuperSonics (from Milwaukee)	Oregon (Jr)
1	15	Reece Gaines	F/G	United States	Orlando Magic	Louisville (Sr)
1	16	Troy Bell	PG	United States	Boston Celtics (traded to Memphis)	Boston College (Sr)
1	17	Žarko Čabarkapa	SF	Serbia and Montenegro	Phoenix Suns	Budućnost Podgorica (Serbia and Montenegro and Adriatic League)
1	18	David West^{+}	PF	United States	New Orleans Hornets	Xavier (Sr)
1	19	Sasha Pavlović	F/G	Serbia and Montenegro	Utah Jazz	Budućnost Podgorica (Serbia and Montenegro and Adriatic League)
1	20	Dahntay Jones	SG	United States	Boston Celtics (from Philadelphia, traded to Memphis)	Duke (Sr)
1	21	Boris Diaw	PF	France	Atlanta Hawks (from Indiana)	Pau-Orthez (France)
1	22	Zoran Planinić	G/F	Croatia	New Jersey Nets	Cibona Zagreb (Croatia and Adriatic League)
1	23	Travis Outlaw	SF	United States	Portland Trail Blazers	Starkville HS (Starkville, Mississippi)
1	24	Brian Cook	PF	United States	Los Angeles Lakers	Illinois (Sr)
1	25	Carlos Delfino	SG	Argentina	Detroit Pistons	Skipper Bologna (Italy)
1	26	Ndudi Ebi	SF	United Kingdom; Nigeria	Minnesota Timberwolves	Westbury Christian HS (Houston, Texas)
1	27	Kendrick Perkins	C	United States	Memphis Grizzlies (from Sacramento via Orlando, traded to Boston)	Ozen HS (Beaumont, Texas)
1	28	Leandro Barbosa	SG	Brazil	San Antonio Spurs (traded to Phoenix)	Bauru Tilibra (Brazil)
1	29	Josh Howard^{+}	F/G	United States	Dallas Mavericks	Wake Forest (Sr)
2	30	Maciej Lampe	PF	Poland	New York Knicks (from Denver)	Complutense University of Madrid (Spain)
2	31	Jason Kapono	F/G	United States	Cleveland Cavaliers	UCLA (Sr)
2	32	Luke Walton	SF	United States	Los Angeles Lakers (from Toronto)	Arizona (Sr)
2	33	Jerome Beasley	PF	United States	Miami Heat	North Dakota (Sr)
2	34	Sofoklis Schortsanitis^{#}	C	Greece	Los Angeles Clippers	Iraklis BC (Greece)
2	35	Szymon Szewczyk^{#}	PF	Poland	Milwaukee Bucks (from Memphis)	Braunschweig (Germany)
2	36	Mario Austin^{#}	PF	United States	Chicago Bulls	Mississippi State (Jr)
2	37	Travis Hansen	SG	United States	Atlanta Hawks	BYU (Sr)
2	38	Steve Blake	PG	United States	Washington Wizards	Maryland (Sr)
2	39	Slavko Vraneš	C	Serbia and Montenegro	New York Knicks	Budućnost Podgorica (Serbia and Montenegro and Adriatic League)
2	40	Derrick Zimmerman	PG	United States	Golden State Warriors	Mississippi State (Sr)
2	41	Willie Green	SG	United States	Seattle SuperSonics (traded to Philadelphia)	Detroit (Sr)
2	42	Zaza Pachulia	PF	Georgia	Orlando Magic	Ülkerspor (Turkey)
2	43	Keith Bogans	SG	United States	Milwaukee Bucks (traded to Orlando)	Kentucky (Sr)
2	44	Malick Badiane^{#}	PF	Senegal	Houston Rockets	Langen (Germany)
2	45	Matt Bonner	F	United States	Chicago Bulls (from Phoenix, traded to Toronto)	Florida (Sr)
2	46	Sani Bečirović^{#}	SG	Slovenia	Denver Nuggets (from Boston)	Virtus Bologna (Italy)
2	47	Mo Williams^{+}	PG	United States	Utah Jazz	Alabama (So)
2	48	James Lang	C	United States	New Orleans Hornets	Central Park Christian HS (Birmingham, Alabama)
2	49	James Jones	SF	United States	Indiana Pacers	Miami (Florida) (Sr)
2	50	Paccelis Morlende^{#}	PG	France	Philadelphia 76ers (traded to Seattle)	Dijon (France)
2	51	Kyle Korver^{+}	SG	United States	New Jersey Nets (traded to Philadelphia)	Creighton (Sr)
2	52	Remon van de Hare	C	Netherlands	Toronto Raptors (from Los Angeles Lakers)	FC Barcelona (Spain)
2	53	Tommy Smith^{#}	PF	United States	Chicago Bulls (from Detroit via Miami)	Arizona State (Sr)
2	54	Nedžad Sinanović^{#}	C	Bosnia and Herzegovina	Portland Trail Blazers	Brotnjo (Bosnia and Herzegovina)
2	55	Rick Rickert^{#}	PF	United States	Minnesota Timberwolves	Minnesota (So)
2	56	Brandon Hunter	PF	United States	Boston Celtics (from Sacramento)	Ohio (Sr)
2	57	Xue Yuyang^{#}	C	China	Dallas Mavericks (traded to Denver)	Hong Kong Flying Dragons (China)
2	58	Andreas Glyniadakis	C	Greece	Detroit Pistons (from San Antonio)	AEK (Greece)

a: Chris Kaman was born in the United States, but also has German citizenship through his great-grandparents and competes internationally for Germany.

== Notable undrafted players ==
These players were not selected in the 2003 NBA draft, but have played at least one game in the NBA.

Player	Position	Nationality	School/club team
Earl Barron	C	United States	Memphis (Sr.)
Kevin Burleson	PG	United States	Minnesota (Sr.)
José Calderón	PG	Spain	Tau Cerámica (Spain)
Matt Carroll	SG	United States	Notre Dame (Sr.)
Marquis Daniels	SG	United States	Auburn (Sr.)
Ronald Dupree	SF	United States	LSU (Sr.)
Noel Felix	PF	United States; Belize	Fresno State (Sr.)
Hiram Fuller	PF	United States; Libya	Fresno State (Sr.)
Britton Johnsen	SF/PF	United States	Utah (Sr.)
Desmond Penigar	PF	United States	Utah State (Sr.)
Kirk Penney	SG/SF	New Zealand	Wisconsin (Sr.)
Josh Powell	PF	United States	NC State (So.)
Kasib Powell	SF	United States	Texas Tech (Sr.)
Quinton Ross	SG	United States	SMU (Sr.)
Melvin Sanders	SG/SF	United States	Oklahoma State (Sr.)
James Singleton	SF/PF	United States	Murray State (Sr.)
Theron Smith	SF/PF	United States	Ball State (Sr.)

== Draft lottery ==
^	Denotes the actual lottery result

Team	2002–03 record	Lottery	Lottery probabilities												
Team	2002–03 record	Lottery	1st	2nd	3rd	4th	5th	6th	7th	8th	9th	10th	11th	12th	13th
Cleveland Cavaliers	17–65	225	.225^	.215	.178	.357	—	—	—	—	—	—	—	—	—
Denver Nuggets	17–65	225	.225	.188	.171^	.319	.123	—	—	—	—	—	—	—	—
Toronto Raptors	24–58	157	.157	.157	.156	.226^	.265	.040	—	—	—	—	—	—	—
Miami Heat	25–57	120	.120	.126	.133	.099	.350^	.161	.013	—	—	—	—	—	—
Los Angeles Clippers	28–54	89	.089	.097	.107	—	.261	.360^	.084	.004	—	—	—	—	—
Memphis Grizzlies	28–54	64	.064	.071^	.081	—	—	.440	.304	.040	.001	—	—	—	—
Chicago Bulls	30–52	44	.044	.049	.058	—	—	—	.599^	.232	.018	.000	—	—	—
Atlanta Hawks	35–47	29	.029	.022	.027	—	—	—	—	.724^	.197	.011	.000	—	—
New York Knicks	37–45	15	.015	.022	.027	—	—	—	—	—	.784^	.143	.005	.000	—
Washington Wizards	37–45	14	.014	.021	.025	—	—	—	—	—	—	.846^	.087	.002	.000
Golden State Warriors	38–44	7	.007	.009	.012	—	—	—	—	—	—	—	.907^	.063	.001
Seattle SuperSonics	40–42	6	.006	.008	.010	—	—	—	—	—	—	—	—	.935^	.039
Houston Rockets	43–39	5	.005	.007	.009	—	—	—	—	—	—	—	—	—	.960^

== Early entrants ==
=== College underclassmen ===
In terms of underclassmen declaring for this year's draft, the number of players available for entry this year would increase up to 73 after previously being down a bit the previous year. However, it would also see the most withdrawn entries from underclassmen either in college, overseas, or even high school in the case of Charlie Villanueva with 27 total people doing exactly that. As such, there would actually be 46 underclassmen that qualified as such for this year's draft, which would be an overall step down when compared to last year's official number of underclassmen entering the NBA draft. The following college basketball players successfully applied for early draft entrance.

- (United States) Chris Alexander – C, Iowa State (junior)
- (United States) Carmelo Anthony – F, Syracuse (freshman)
- (United States) Mario Austin – F, Mississippi State (junior)
- (United States) Ronald Blackshear – G, Marshall (junior)
- (United States) Chris Bosh – F, Georgia Tech (freshman)
- (United States) Lamar Castile – G, CC of Beaver County (sophomore)
- (United States) Rod Edwards – G, Ouachita Baptist (junior)
- (Canada) Carl English – G, Hawaii (junior)
- (United States) T. J. Ford – G, Texas (sophomore)
- (United States) Zack Fray – F, Santa Ana (sophomore)
- (United States) Jonathan Hargett – G, West Virginia (freshman)
- (United States) David Hamilton – F, Salem International (junior)
- (United States) Jarvis Hayes – F/G, Georgia (junior)
- (United States) Maurice Jackson – F, Texas–Permian (junior)
- (United States) Richard Jeter – G, Atlanta Metro (sophomore)
- (Germany) Chris Kaman – C, Central Michigan (junior)
- (United States) Josh Powell – F, NC State (sophomore)
- (United States) Rick Rickert – F, Minnesota (sophomore)
- (United States) Luke Ridnour – G, Oregon (junior)
- (United States) Rob Smith – F, North Carolina Wesleyan (junior)
- (United States) Michael Sweetney – F, Georgetown (junior)
- (United States) Dwyane Wade – G, Marquette (junior)
- (United States) Mo Williams – G, Alabama (sophomore)
- (United States) Doug Wrenn – F/G, Washington (junior)

=== High school players ===
This would be the ninth straight year in a row where at least one high school player would declare their entry into the NBA draft directly out of high school after previously only allowing it one time back in 1975. However, it would be one of the most famous ones due to the entry of high school phenom LeBron James entering the NBA draft this year, being the second high schooler to be drafted at #1 behind only Kwame Brown back in 2001, as well as being the second high schooler to win the NBA Rookie of the Year Award behind Amar'e Stoudemire only a year prior. This draft also saw a high schooler named Charlie Villanueva initially enter for the NBA draft, but withdraw his name and go to college before the draft began. The following high school players successfully applied for early draft entrance.

- (Nigeria) Ndudi Ebi – F, Westbury Christian School (Houston, Texas)
- (United States) LeBron James – G, St. Vincent–St. Mary High School (Akron, Ohio)
- (United States) James Lang – F, Central Park Christian High School (Birmingham, Alabama)
- (United States) Travis Outlaw – F, Starkville High School (Starkville, Mississippi)
- (United States) Kendrick Perkins – F, Clifton J. Ozen High School (Beaumont, Texas)

=== International players ===
The following international players successfully applied for early draft entrance.

- (Senegal) Malick Badiane – F, Langen (Germany)
- Leandro Barbosa – G, Bauru Tilibra (Brazil)
- (Argentina) Carlos Delfino – G, Skipper Bologna (Italy)
- Boris Diaw – F, Pau-Orthez (France)
- (Poland) Maciej Lampe – F, Universidad Complutense (Spain)
- Darko Miličić – F, Hemofarm Vršac (Serbia and Montenegro)
- (Georgia (country)) Zaza Pachulia – F/C, Ülker (Turkey)
- Aleksandar Pavlović – G/F, Budućnost (Serbia and Montenegro)
- Mickaël Piétrus – G, Pau-Orthez (France)
- Zoran Planinić – G, Cibona (Croatia)
- Sofoklis Schortsanitis – F, Iraklis (Greece)
- Nedžad Sinanović – C, Brotnjo (Bosnia and Herzegovina)
- (Iceland) Jón Arnór Stefánsson – G, Trier (Germany)
- (Poland) Szymon Szewczyk – F, Braunschweig (Germany)
- (Netherlands) Remon van de Hare – C/F, FC Barcelona (Spain)
- Slavko Vraneš – C, Budućnost (Serbia and Montenegro)
- Xue Yuyang – F, Hong Kong Flying Dragons (China)

== Invited attendees ==
The 2003 NBA draft is considered to be the 25th NBA draft to have utilized what is properly considered the "green room" experience for NBA prospects. The NBA's green room is a staging area where anticipated draftees often sit with their families and representatives, waiting for their names to be called on draft night. Often being positioned either in front of or to the side of the podium (in this case, being positioned somewhere within The Theater at Madison Square Garden), once a player heard his name, he would walk to the podium to shake hands and take promotional photos with the NBA commissioner. From there, the players often conducted interviews with various media outlets while backstage. However, once the NBA draft started to air nationally on TV starting with the 1980 NBA draft, the green room evolved from players waiting to hear their name called and then shaking hands with these select players who were often called to the hotel to take promotional pictures with the NBA commissioner a day or two after the draft concluded to having players in real-time waiting to hear their names called up and then shaking hands with David Stern, the NBA's commissioner at the time.

The NBA compiled its list of green room invites through collective voting by the NBA's team presidents and general managers alike, which in this year's case belonged to only what they believed were the top 14 prospects at the time. Despite the lower amount of invites for this year's draft when compared to the previous year's draft, there would still be a notable amount of discrepancies involved with the invitations at hand, such as the missing invitations to future All-Stars David West, Josh Howard, and arguably second round pick Mo Williams and Kyle Korver as well, alongside the missing invitation for French shooting guard Mickaël Piétrus and the invitation for Maciej Lampe, who was taken at the start of the second round despite draft projections for the time considering Lampe to be a Top 5-10 draft choice at the time. With all of that in mind, the following players were invited to attend this year's draft festivities live and in person.

- (United States) Carmelo Anthony – SF/PF, Syracuse
- (United States) Chris Bosh – PF/C, Georgia Tech
- / Žarko Čabarkapa – SF/PF, Budućnost Podgorica (Serbia and Montenegro)
- (United States) Nick Collison – PF/C, Kansas
- (United States) T. J. Ford – PG, Texas
- (United States) Reece Gaines – SG/SF, Louisville
- (United States) / (Qatar) Jarvis Hayes – PG/SG, Georgia
- (United States) Kirk Hinrich – PG, Kansas
- (United States) LeBron James – SG/SF, St. Vincent–St. Mary High School (Akron, Ohio)
- (United States) / (Germany) Chris Kaman – C, Central Michigan
- (Poland) / (Sweden) Maciej Lampe – PF/C, Universidad Complutense de Madrid (Spain)
- / Darko Miličić – PF/C, Hemofarm Vršac (Serbia and Montenegro)
- (United States) Michael Sweetney – PF, Georgetown
- (United States) Dwyane Wade – SG, Marquette

== See also ==
- List of first overall NBA draft picks
