= Paccelis Morlende =

French basketball player & coach (born 1981)

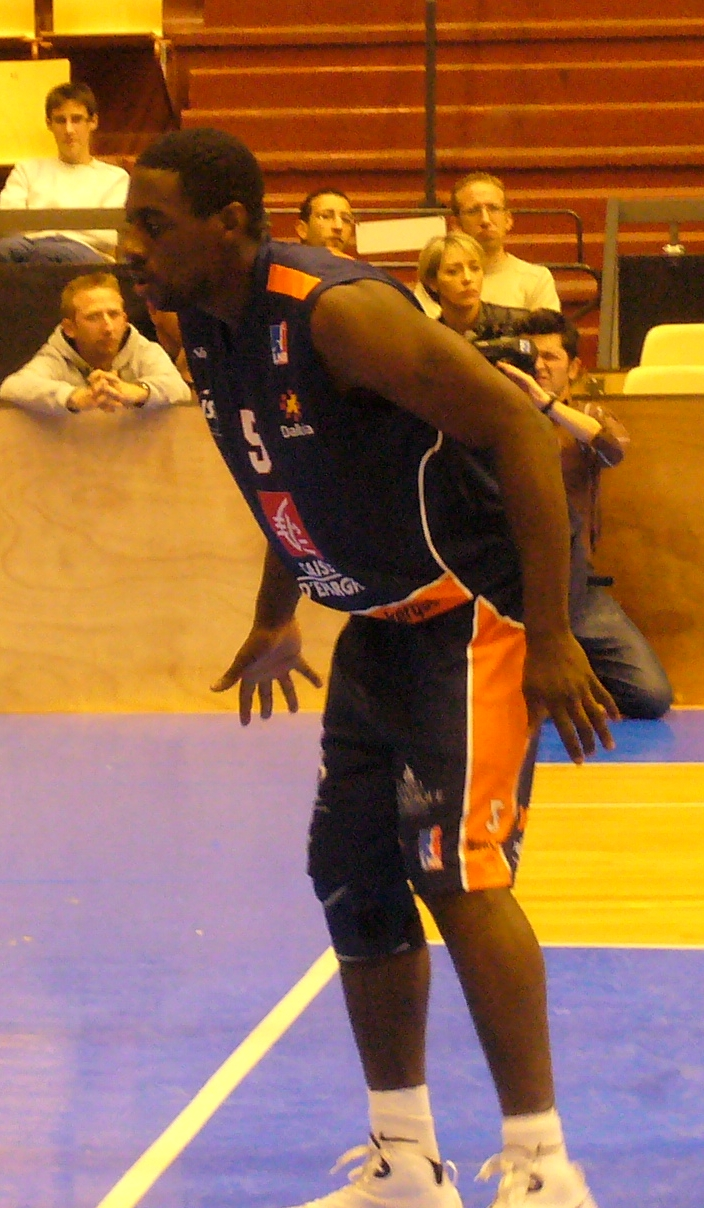

Hermine de Nantes Atlantique
- Title: Coach (U-17)
- League: LNB Pro B

Personal information
- Born: 19 April 1981 (age 45) Creil, France
- Listed height: 6 ft 2 in (1.88 m)
- Listed weight: 185 lb (84 kg)

Career information
- NBA draft: 2003: 2nd round, 50th overall pick
- Drafted by: Philadelphia 76ers
- Playing career: 1998–2017
- Position: Point guard
- Coaching career: 2017–present

Career history

Playing
- 1998–2004: JDA Dijon Basket
- 2004–2005: Benetton Treviso
- 2005: Roseto Sharks
- 2006: Valladolid
- 2006–2008: BCM Gravelines
- 2008–2009: Ural Great Perm
- 2010–2012: Hyères-Toulon Var Basket
- 2012–2014: ASVEL Basket
- 2014–2015: Bourg-en-Bresse
- 2015–2016: Hermine de Nantes Atlantique
- 2016–2017: Pornic Basket Saint Michel

Coaching
- 2017–present: Hermine de Nantes Atlantique (U-17)

Career highlights
- Italian Cup (2005); Italian Super Cup (2004)
- Stats at Basketball Reference

Paccelis Morlende (born 19 April 1981) is a French basketball coach for U-17 team of the Hermine de Nantes Atlantique of the LNB Pro B and a former professional basketball player.

== Professional career ==
Morlende's career started with JDA Dijon, where he spent his career prior to being drafted by the Philadelphia 76ers with the 50th overall pick in the 2003 NBA draft. He was traded on draft day to the Seattle SuperSonics for Willie Green and cash considerations. Morlende played his entire professional basketball career overseas, averaging 7.9 points per game with JDA Dijon.

With his retirement in 2017, Morlende became 1 of 11 players from the 2003 NBA Draft to never play a game in the league during his professional basketball career.

== Coaching career ==
Morlende coached Hermine de Nantes Atlantique U-17 team and brought the team to final of Coupe de France U17 in 2018, but lost in final to JL Bourg Basket U-17 team.
