= List of Jewish American sportspeople =

This is a list of notable Jewish American sportspeople. For other Jewish Americans, see Lists of Jewish Americans; for Jewish sportspeople from other countries, see List of Jews in sport.

== Baseball ==
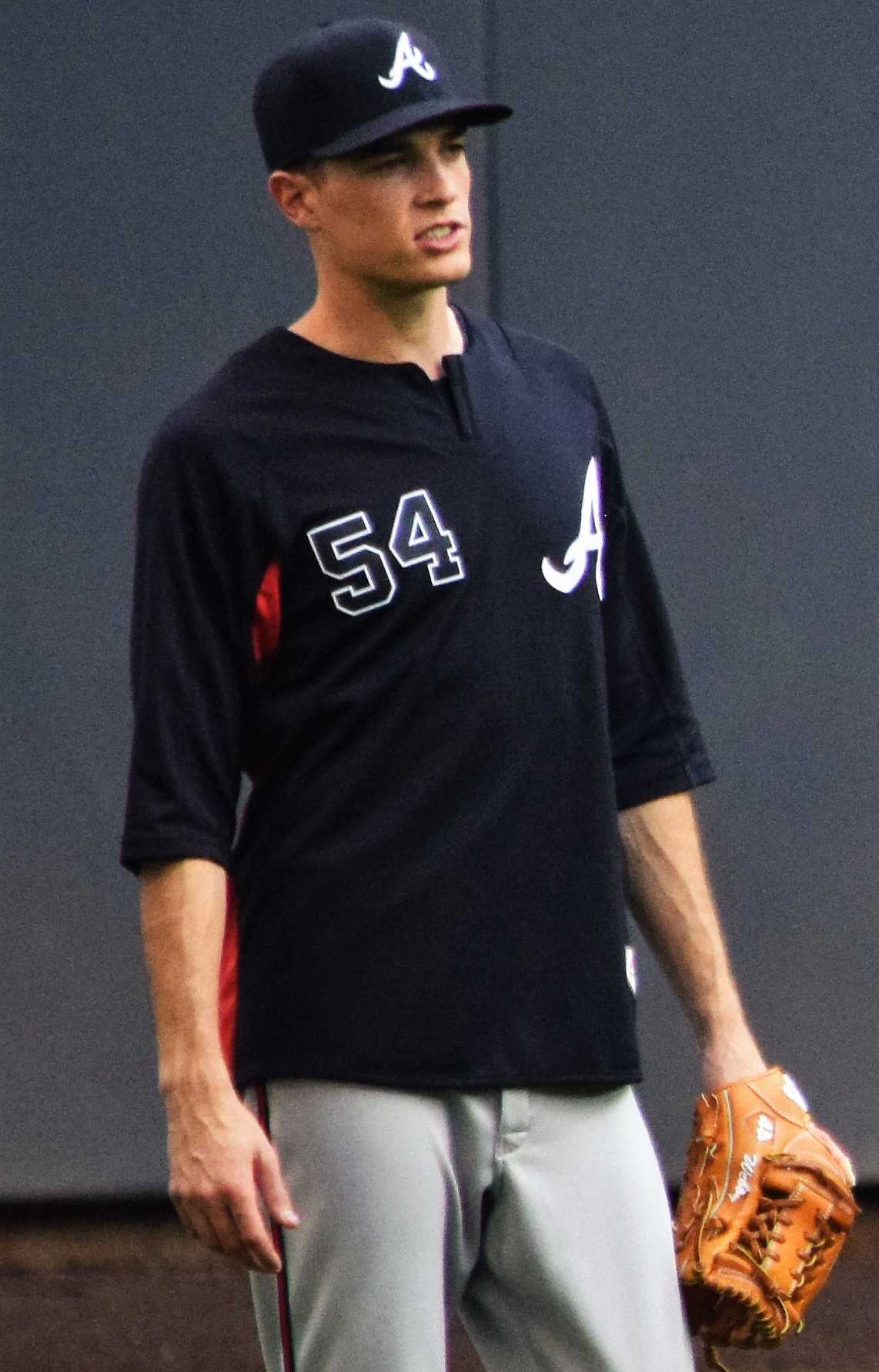
Max Fried, pitcher (Atlanta Braves)

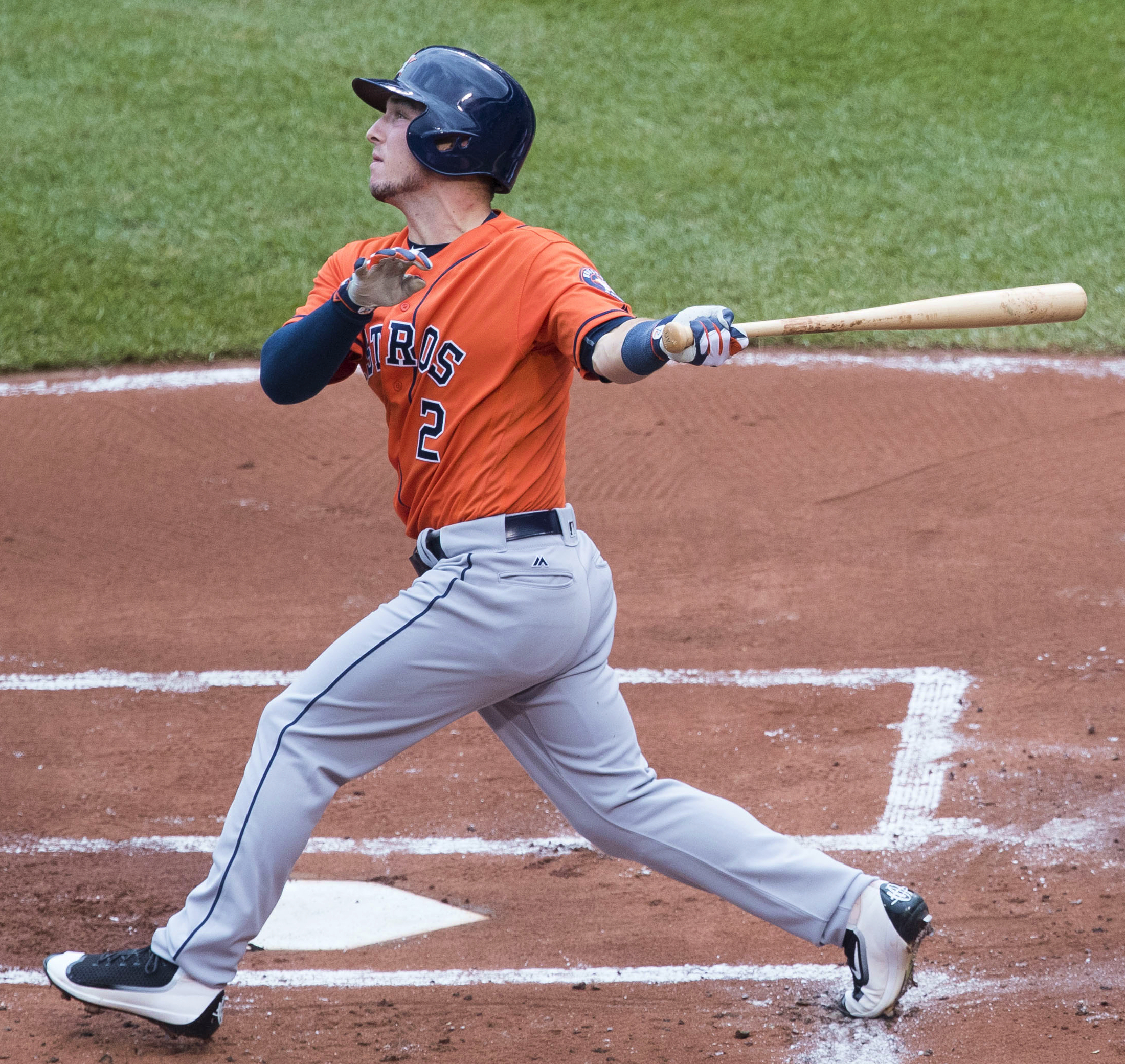
Alex Bregman, third baseman

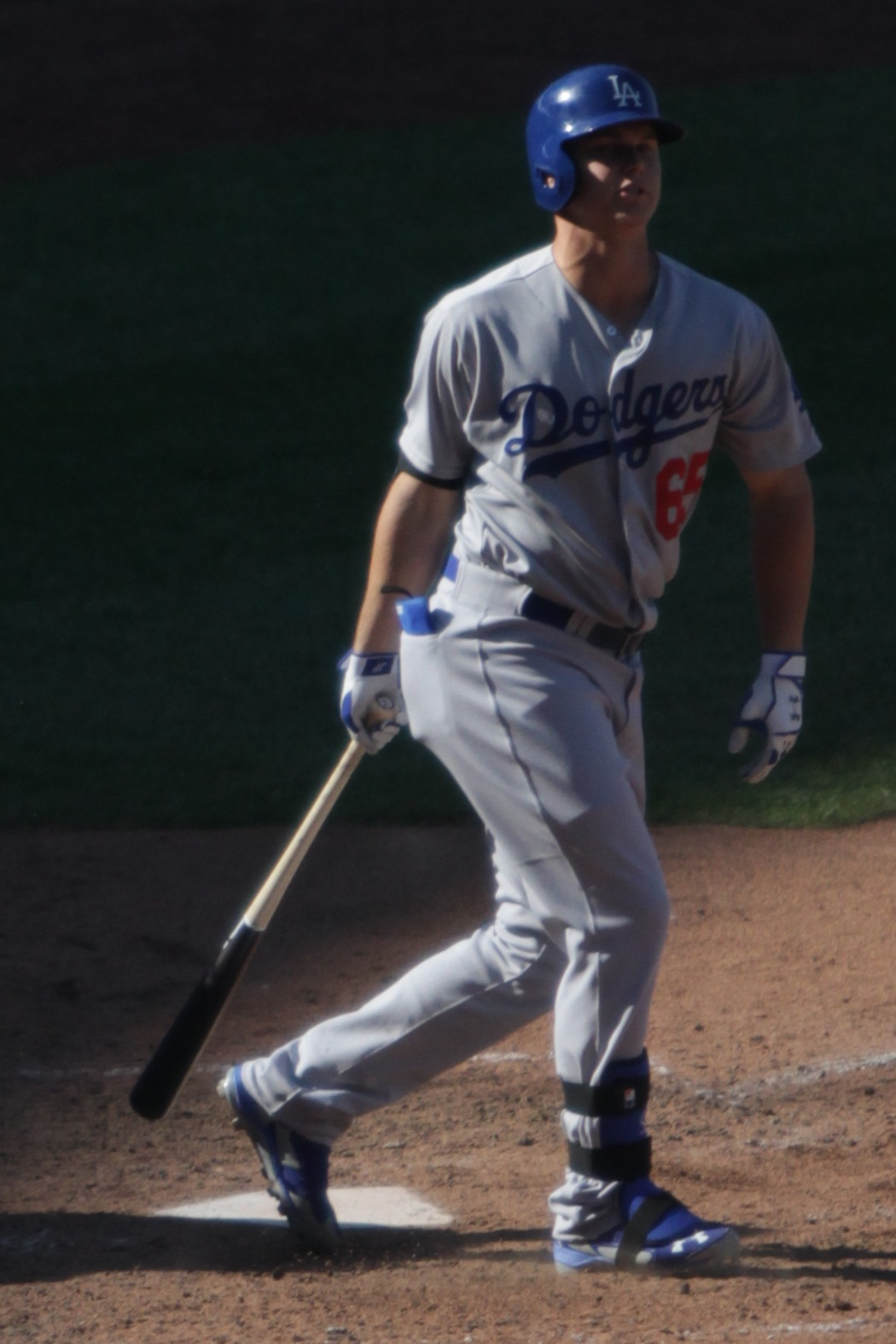
Joc Pederson, outfielder

=== Players ===
- Cal Abrams
- Lloyd Allen (converted to Judaism)
- Rubén Amaro, Jr. (Jewish mother)
- Morrie Arnovich, All Star
- Brad Ausmus, catcher, All-Star, 3x Gold Glove
- Dylan Axelrod
- Harrison Bader
- Corey Baker
- Jesse Baker
- Brian Bark
- Ross Baumgarten
- Jose Bautista (Jewish mother)
- Bo Belinsky (Jewish mother)
- Joe Bennett
- Moe Berg
- Richard Bleier, pitcher (Baltimore Orioles)
- Bob Berman
- Jeremy Bleich
- Cy Block
- Ron Blomberg (1948–), Major League's first designated hitter
- Sam Bohne
- Zach Borenstein
- Lou Boudreau (Jewish mother), 8x All-Star, batting title, MVP, Baseball Hall of Fame, manager
- Ralph Branca, pitcher, 3x All-Star (Jewish mother)
- Ryan Braun, outfielder, 2007 Rookie of the Year, home run champion, 5x All-Star, 5x Silver Slugger, 2011 National League MVP
- Alex Bregman, infielder (Chicago Cubs)
- Craig Breslow, pitcher
- Louis Brower
- Danny Burawa
- Scott Burcham
- Conrad Cardinal
- Cole Carrigg
- Harry Chozen
- Tony Cogan
- Alta Cohen
- Andy Cohen (1904–1988), 2nd baseman for the New York Giants (1926, 1928, 1929); managed one game for the 1960 Philadelphia Phillies
- Harrison Cohen
- Hy Cohen
- Syd Cohen
- Phil Cooney
- Ed Corey
- Gabe Cramer
- Bill Cristall
- Harry Danning, catcher, 4x All-Star
- Ike Davis, first baseman
- Cody Decker
- Harry Eisenstat
- Mike Epstein
- Reuben Ewing
- Al Federoff
- Harry Feldman
- Scott Feldman, pitcher
- Leo Fishel
- Jake Fishman
- Matt Ford
- Nate Freiman
- Max Fried, pitcher (Atlanta Braves)
- Sam Fuld, outfielder and general manager
- Blake Gailen
- Jake Gelof
- Brad Goldberg, pitcher (Chicago White Sox)
- Colton Gordon
- Sid Gordon, outfielder & third baseman, 2x All-Star
- John Grabow
- Shawn Green, right fielder, 2x All-Star, Gold Glove, Silver Slugger
- Adam Greenberg (1981–), outfielder with the Chicago Cubs
- Hank Greenberg, first baseman & outfielder, 5x All-Star, 4x home run champion, 4x RBI leader, 2x MVP, Baseball Hall of Fame
- Mickey Haslin (whose father, George Haslinsky, was a son of Anna née Jaszová)
- Tyler Herron
- Jason Hirsh, starting pitcher
- Ken Holtzman, starting pitcher, 2x All-Star. pitched two major league no-hitters
- Joe Horlen, pitcher, All-Star, ERA leader
- Brian Horwitz, outfielder
- Spencer Horwitz
- Troy Johnston
- Jake Kalish
- Rob Kaminsky
- Gabe Kapler, outfielder, manager, 2021 NL Manager of the Year
- Alex Katz
- Ty Kelly, utility player
- Ian Kinsler, second baseman, 4x All-Star
- Jerry Klein, pitcher
- Kenny Koplove
- Sandy Koufax, starting pitcher, 6x All-Star, 5x ERA leader, 4x strikeouts leader, 3x Wins leader, 2x W-L% leader, 1 perfect game, MVP, 3x Cy Young Award, Baseball Hall of Fame
- Evan Kravetz
- Dean Kremer
- Tyler Krieger
- Jared Lakind
- Barry Latman, pitcher
- Ryan Lavarnway, catcher
- Max Lazar
- Zach Levenson
- Mike Lieberthal, catcher, 2x All-Star, Gold Glove
- Jason Marquis, starting pitcher, Silver Slugger, All Star
- Bob Melvin, catcher & manager of the San Diego Padres
- Matt Mervis
- Mike Meyers
- Marvin Miller, first director of the MLBPA
- Kyle Molnar
- Eli Morgan
- Jon Moscot, pitcher (Cincinnati Reds)
- Troy Neiman
- David Newhan (whose father is Ross Newhan)
- Jeff Newman, catcher & first baseman, All-Star, manager
- R.C. Orlan
- Joc Pederson, outfielder (Arizona Diamondbacks)
- Barney Pelty
- Lefty Phillips, managed the California Angels in the late 1960s and early 1970s
- Lipman Pike, major league baseball's first player. outfielder, second baseman, & manager, 4x home run champion, RBI leader
- Kevin Pillar, center fielder
- Jake Pitler
- Aaron Poreda, pitcher
- Ryan Prager
- Scott Radinsky, pitcher
- Jimmie Reese
- Jerry Reinsdorf, owner, Chicago White Sox
- Nick Rickles
- Dave Roberts, pitcher
- Saul Rogovin, pitcher
- Al Rosen, third baseman & first baseman, 4x All-Star, 2x home run champion, 2x RBI leader, MVP
- Wayne Rosenthal
- Bubby Rossman
- Josh Satin, second baseman for the Mets
- Richie Scheinblum, outfielder, All-Star
- Scott Schoeneweis
- RJ Schreck
- Art Shamsky, outfielder and first baseman in the '60s and '70s with the Reds and Mets.
- Ryan Sherriff
- Larry Sherry, relief pitcher for the Dodgers
- Norm Sherry, catcher, managed the California Angels
- Mose Solomon, "The Rabbi of Swat"
- Jacob Steinmetz
- Robert Stock
- George Stone, outfielder, 1x batting title
- Steve Stone, All Star, Cy Young Award
- C.J. Stubbs
- Garrett Stubbs
- Zack Thornton
- Danny Valencia, third baseman
- Joey Wagman
- Steve Wapnick, relief pitcher
- Justin Wayne
- Phil Weintraub, nicknamed "Mickey"
- Zack Weiss
- Josh Whitesell, first baseman
- Josh Wolf
- Steve Yeager, catcher for the Los Angeles Dodgers (converted to Judaism)
- Larry Yellen, pitcher for the Houston Colt .45s
- Kevin Youkilis, first baseman, third baseman, & left fielder, 3x All-Star, Gold Glove, Hank Aaron Award
- Josh Zeid, pitcher

=== Umpires ===
- Al Clark
- Al Forman
- Dolly Stark, first Jewish umpire in modern baseball.

== Basketball ==
=== Basketball players ===
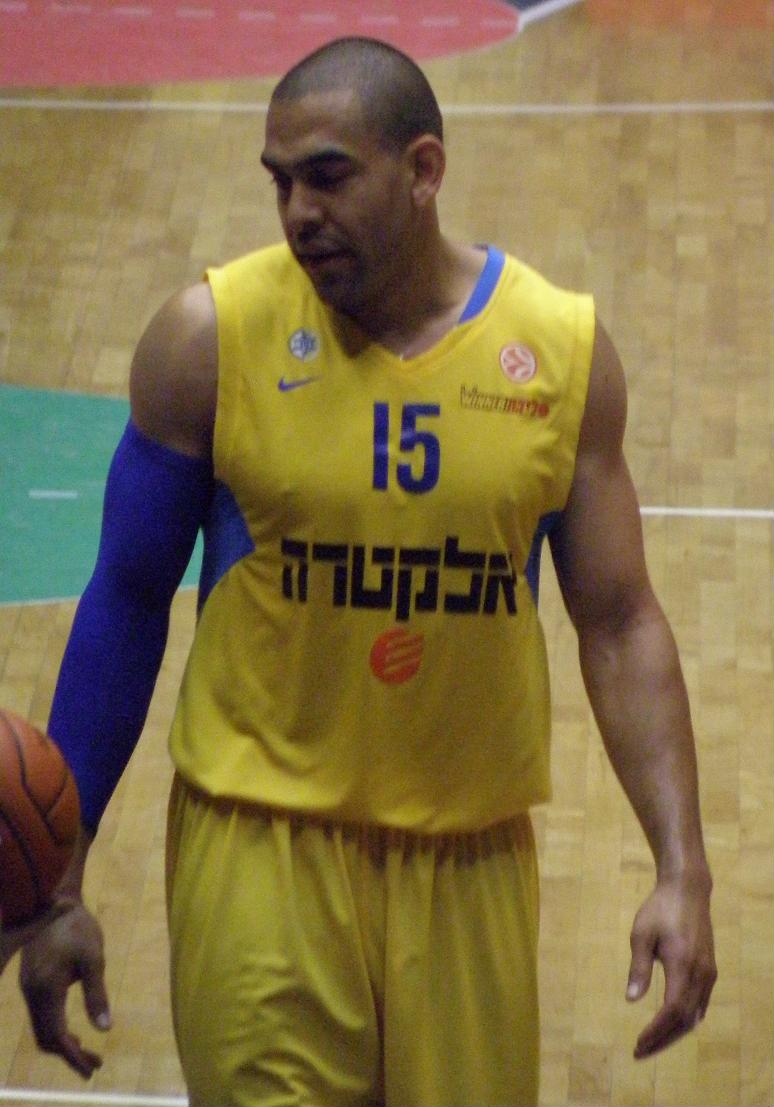
David Blu

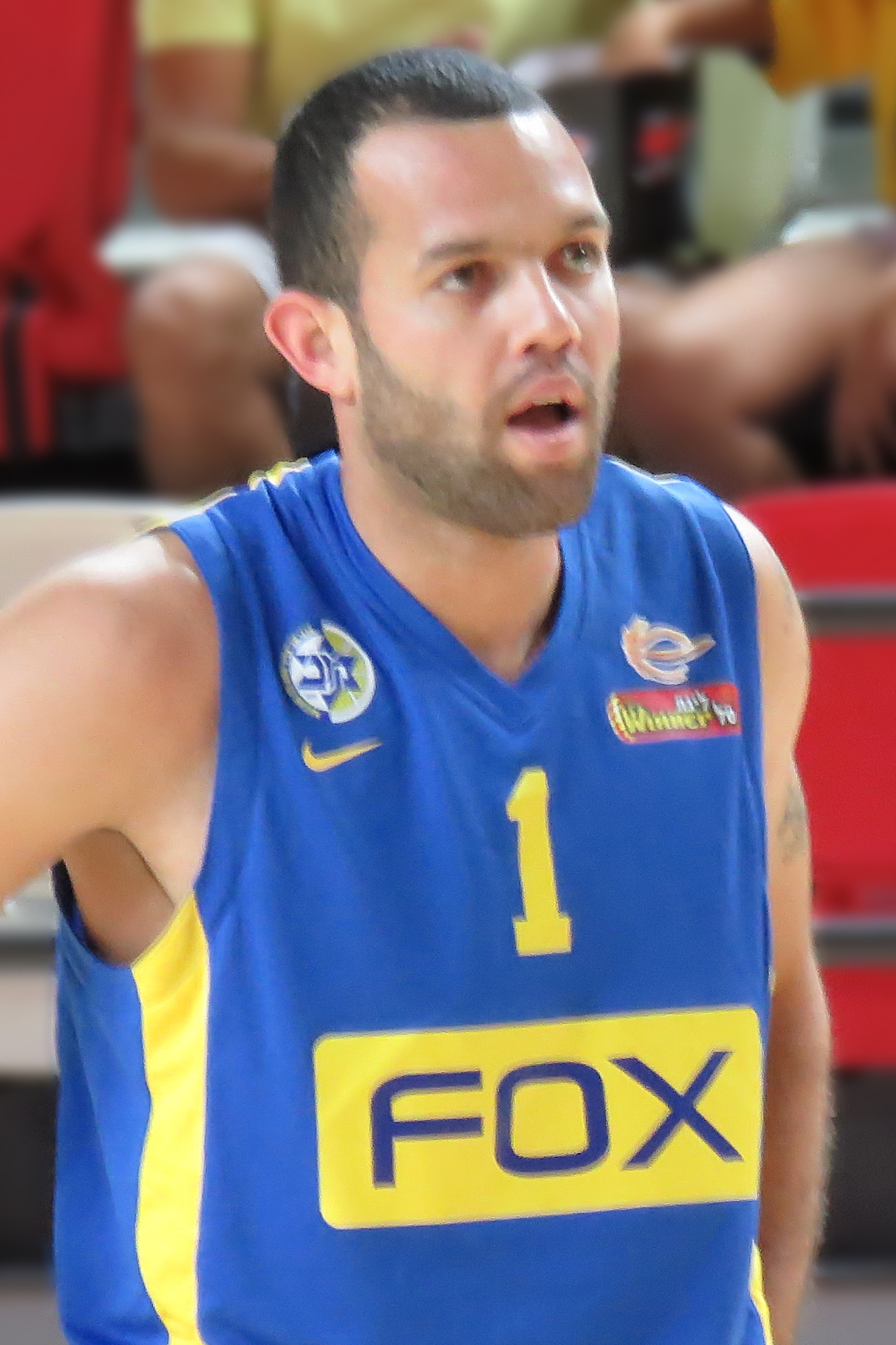
Jordan Farmar

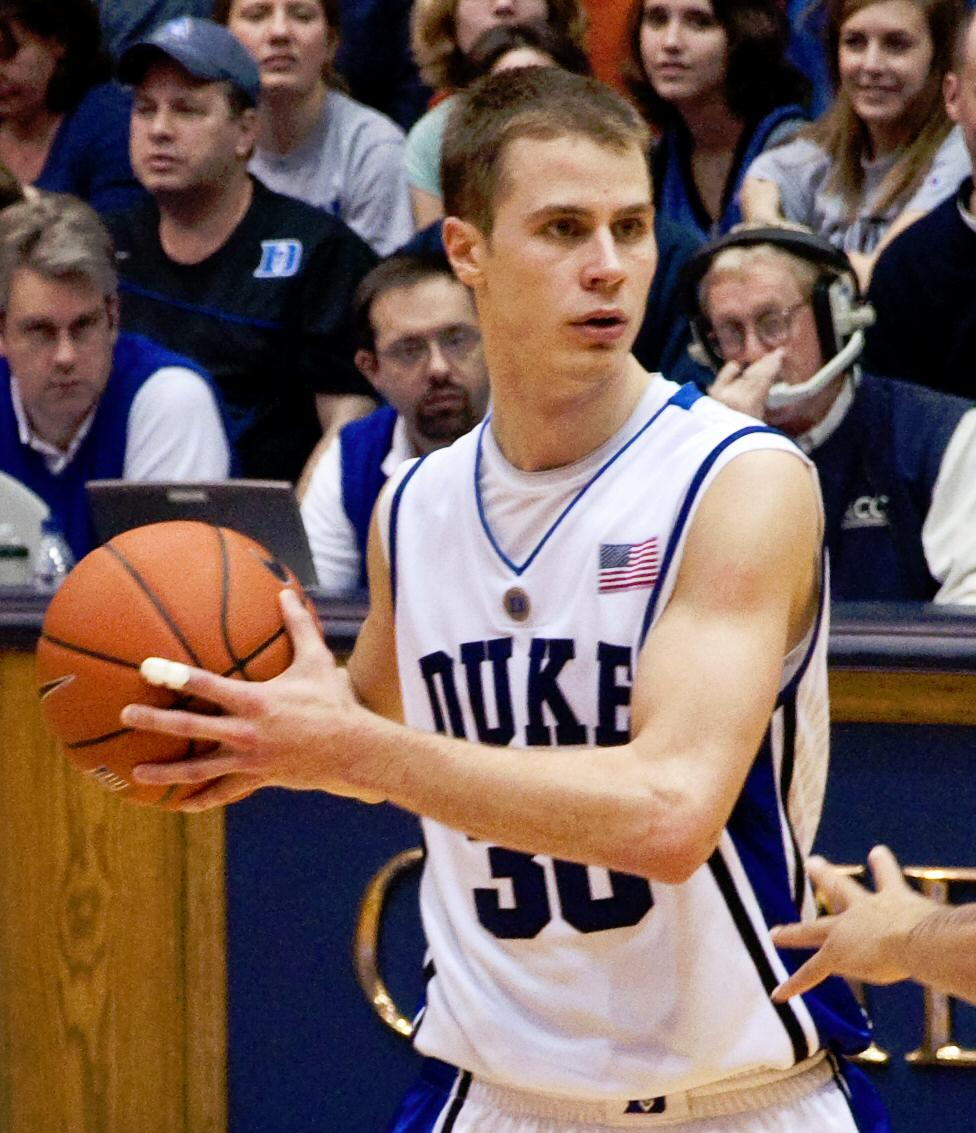
Jon Scheyer

- Sam Balter, All American, UCLA; Olympic gold medal at the 1936 Berlin Olympics; longtime radio and TV broadcaster
- Irv Bemoras, All American, University of Illinois. Guard/forward, Milwaukee Hawks and St. Louis Hawks
- Sue Bird, NCAA player of the year, University of Connecticut; 11 time All Star with the WNBA's Seattle Storm; 4 Olympic gold medals; 4 World Cup gold medals
- David Blu, forward, University of Southern California. Played in Euroleague, including 5 seasons with Maccabi Tel Aviv
- Omri Casspi, 1st Israeli-born NBA draft pick; forward for 8 NBA teams as well as Maccabi Tel Aviv
- Jake Cohen, American-Israeli power forward for Maccabi Tel Aviv and the Israeli national basketball team
- Shay Doron, All Conference, University of Maryland. Shooting guard, WNBA's New York Liberty and the Israeli League
- Jordan Farmar, All Conference, UCLA. Guard, Los Angeles Lakers, New Jersey Nets, and Maccabi Tel Aviv
- Marty Friedman, pre-NBA player for such teams as the New York Whirlwinds and Cleveland Rosenblums. Naismith Hall of Fame.
- Doug Gottlieb, led NCAA in assists, Oklahoma State. Played Euroleague. Basketball analyst, ESPN, CBS Sports, Fox Sports.
- Art Heyman, NCAA player of the year, Duke; forward for the New York Knicks and the ABA's Pittsburgh Pipers.
- Red Holzman, player and coach, Naismith HOF 1986, 2x NBA Championship coach
- Nate Huffman, center, Central Michigan University, NBA's Toronto Raptors. Suproleague player of the year, Maccabi Tel Aviv
- Ralph Kaplowitz, All American, NYU; guard, Philadelphia Sphas, New York Knicks, Philadelphia Warriors. Started in the first NBA/BAA game (Knicks vs. Huskies)
- Barry Kramer, All-American NYU; forward, NBA's San Francisco Warriors, New York Knicks
- Joel Kramer, all conference, San Diego State; forward for Phoenix Suns and Maccabi Tel Aviv.
- Sylven Landesberg, All ACC, UVA; guard, Maccabi Tel Aviv and EuroLeague
- Rudy LaRusso, All Ivy, Dartmouth College, five-time NBA All Star, Los Angeles Lakers
- Nancy Lieberman, NCAA player of the year, Old Dominion University; professional point guard, pre-WNBA, as well as for Phoenix Mercury. Coach and GM, WNBA's Detroit Shock. Assistant coach, NBA's Sacramento Kings. Television analyst, NBA basketball. Naismith Hall of Fame.
- Lennie Rosenbluth, All American, University of North Carolina, Chapel Hill. Forward, Philadelphia Warriors
- Danny Schayes, center, Syracuse University; 18 seasons in NBA, 8 with Denver Nuggets
- Dolph Schayes, All American, NYU. 12-time All-NBA team, Syracuse Nationals. Naismith Hall of Fame.
- Ossie Schectman, guard, Long Island University. Guard, Philadelphia Sphas and New York Knicks. Scored first basket of BAA/NBA.
- Jon Scheyer, All-American Duke University, head coach, Duke, effective 2022
- Barney Sedran, guard CCNY; pre-NBA star for many teams, including the Cleveland Rosenblums. Shortest player in the Naismith Hall of Fame.
- Amar'e Stoudemire, power forward, New York Knicks; claims to have Jewish roots, but this is unconfirmed
- Sidney Tanenbaum, All-American, NYU; guard for BAA/NBA's New York Knicks and Baltimore Bullets.
- Ryan Turell (born 1999), basketball player for the G-League Motor City Cruise, Yeshiva University.
- Alex Tyus, center, Israeli national team
- Neal Walk, All American, University of Florida. NBA center, mostly with the Phoenix Suns
- Max Zaslofsky, guard/forward, St. John's University, Chicago Stags, New York Knicks; named to 1st 4 All-NBA teams

=== Basketball administrators, coaches, and owners ===
- Senda Berenson Abbott, basketball educator, Naismith Hall of Fame
- Leslie Alexander, owner, Houston Rockets; former owner, Houston Comets
- Micky Arison, owner, Miami Heat
- Red Auerbach, coach, general manager and team president, Boston Celtics; 16 NBA championships. Naismith Hall of Fame.
- Steve Ballmer, owner, Los Angeles Clippers
- Steve Belkin, former owner, Atlanta Hawks
- David Blatt, coach, Cleveland Cavaliers
- David Blitzer, owner, Philadelphia 76ers
- Larry Brown, coach, 8 NBA teams, University of Kansas, SMU. Point guard, University of North Carolina and 4 teams in the American Basketball Association. Olympic gold medal. Naismith Hall of Fame.
- Mark Cuban, owner, Dallas Mavericks
- William Davidson, former owner, Detroit Pistons. Naismith Hall of Fame.
- Lawrence Frank, coach, New Jersey Nets
- Larry Fleisher, president and general counsel to the National Basketball Association Players' Association. Naismith Hall of Fame.
- Dan Gilbert, owner, Cleveland Cavaliers

Harry Glickman, founder & president, Portland Trail Blazers (deceased)

- Todd Golden, player, and coach of the Florida Gators
- Edward Gottlieb, NBA co-founder, coach and owner of Philadelphia/San Francisco Warriors, Naismith Hall of Fame.
- Ernie Grunfeld, general manager, New York Knicks and Milwaukee Bucks; president, Washington Wizards. All-time leading scorer, University of Tennessee. Olympic gold medal. Guard, New York Knicks, Milwaukee Bucks, and Kansas City Kings
- Peter Guber, owner, Golden State Warriors
- Josh Harris, owner, Philadelphia 76ers
- Nat Holman, coach, City College of New York, NCAA and NIT championships in same year. Guard, NYU Violets, Original Celtics. Naismith Hall of Fame.
- Red Holzman, coach, New York Knicks, 2 NBA championships. All American, City College of New York. Guard, Rochester Royals, Kansas City Royals, Milwaukee Hawks. Naismith Hall of Fame.
- George Kaiser, owner, Oklahoma City Thunder
- Louis Klotz, player/coach/manager for the Washington Generals and New York Nationals as they lost 14,000 exhibition games to the Harlem Globetrotters; guard, Philadelphia Sphas and Baltimore Bullets
- Herb Kohl, former owner, Milwaukee Bucks
- Joe Lacob, owner, Golden State Warriors, with Peter Guber
- Guy Lewis, coach, University of Houston. Naismith Hall of Fame.
- Harry Litwack, coach, Temple University. Player, Philadelphia Sphas. Naismith Hall of Fame.
- Stan Kasten, general manager/president, Atlanta Hawks
- Bruce Pearl, coach, University of Tennessee, Auburn University (current)
- Maurice Podoloff, former NBA commissioner
- Jerry Reinsdorf, owner, Chicago Bulls, Naismith Hall of Fame
- Antony Ressler, owner, Atlanta Hawks
- Abe Saperstein, founder, owner, and earliest coach, Harlem Globetrotters. Shortest man in the Naismith Hall of Fame
- Robert Sarver, owner, Phoenix Suns
- Howard Schultz, former owner Seattle SuperSonics and Seattle Storm
- Jon Scheyer, coach and former All American player, Duke University
- Adam Silver, current NBA commissioner
- Herb Simon, owner, Indiana Pacers
- Mel Simon, former co-owner, Indiana Pacers
- Donald Sterling, former owner, Los Angeles Clippers
- David Stern, former NBA commissioner. Naismith Hall of Fame.
- Zollie Volchok, former general manager, Seattle SuperSonics
- Larry Weinberg, former owner, Portland Trail Blazers

== Boxing ==
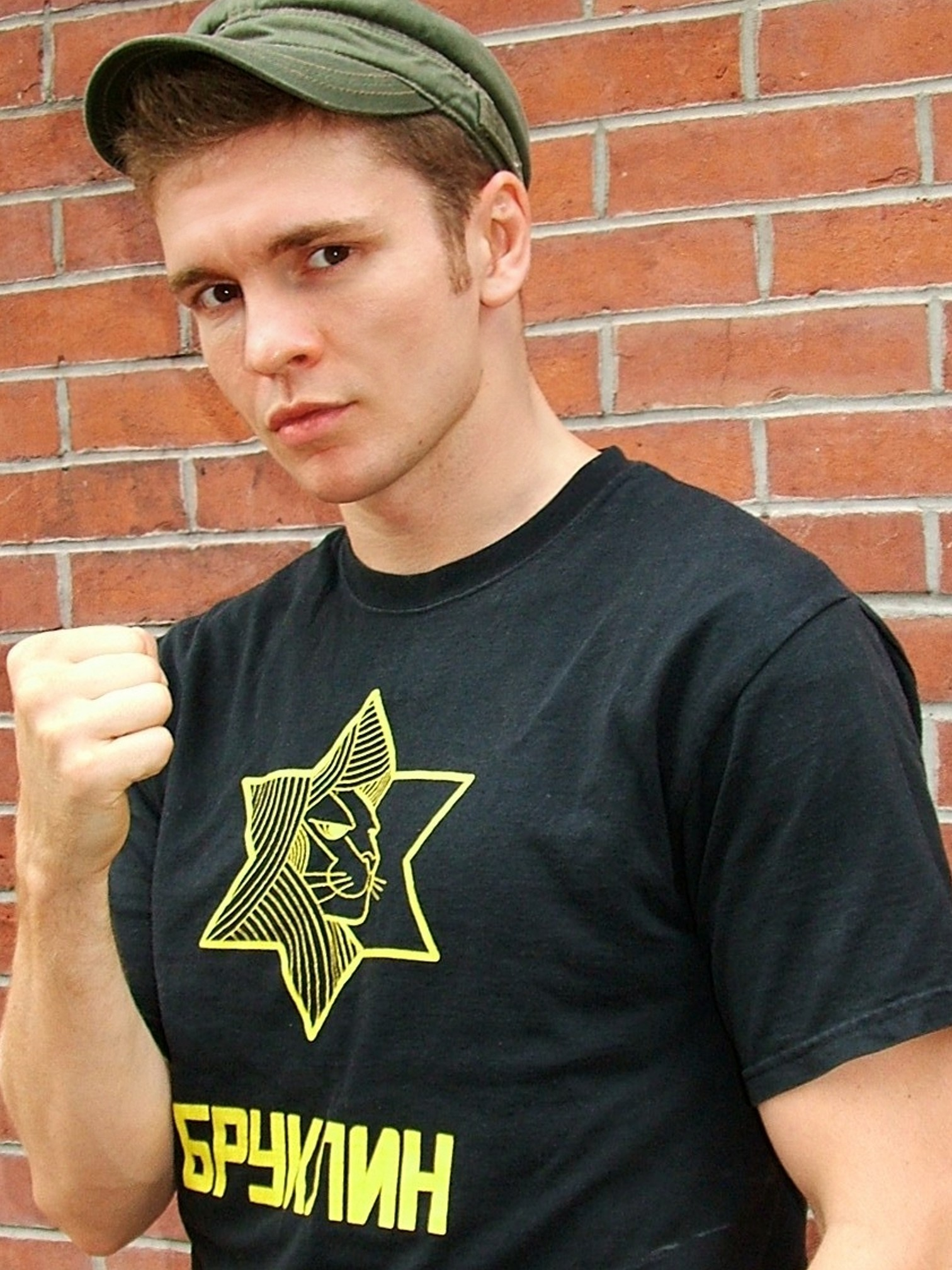
Yuri Foreman

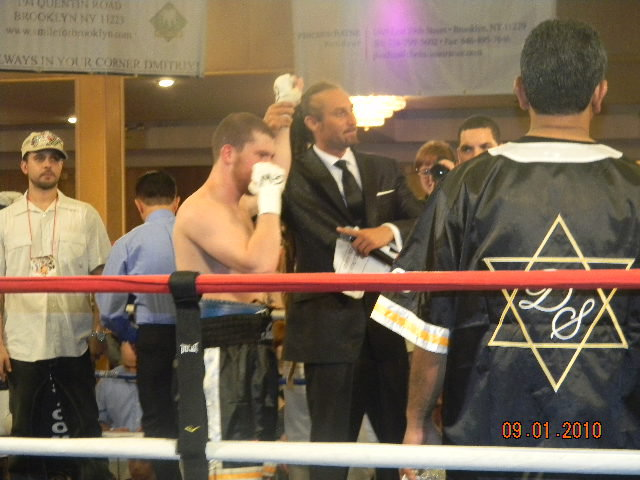
Dmitry Salita

- Ray Arcel, trainer, HoF
- Bob Arum, promoter, HoF
- Abe Attell, world featherweight champion, HoF
- Max Baer, world heavyweight champion, HoF
- Benny Bass, world featherweight champion, HoF
- Samuel Berger, first Olympic heavyweight champion
- Jack Bernstein, world junior lightweight champion
- Mushy Callahan, world junior-welterweight champion, HoF
- Joe Choynski, heavyweight fighter, HoF
- Al "Bummy" Davis, "The Brownsville Bum"; controversial lightweight and welterweight boxer of the 1930s and 1940s
- Yuri Foreman, super welterweight champion
- Benny Goldberg, bantamweight amateur turned pro
- Charley Goldman, trainer, HoF
- Abe Goldstein, world bantamweight champion
- Ronnie Harris, three-time U.S. National Lightweight Champion; gold medalist in Boxing at the 1968 Summer Olympics
- Mike Jacobs, promoter, HoF
- Ben Jeby, world middleweight champion
- Jackie Kallen, promoter
- Kid Kaplan, world featherweight champion, HoF
- Solly Krieger, world middleweight champion
- Herbie Kronowitz, middleweight champion, ranked tenth in the world in the 1940s, native of Brooklyn, New York, later a boxing referee
- Benny Leonard, world lightweight champion, HoF
- Battling Levinsky, world light-heavyweight champion, HoF
- Greg Lobel, heavyweight
- Saoul Mamby, world junior-welterweight champion
- Al McCoy, world welterweight champion
- Boyd Melson, 2008 Olympic alternate and current professional junior middleweight boxer; donates 100% of his fight purses to spinal cord injury research
- Samuel Mosberg, Olympic light-heavyweight gold medalist at the 1920 Olympics where he scored the quickest knock-out in history
- Bob Olin, world light-heavyweight champion
- Charlie Phil Rosenberg, world bantamweight champion
- Dana Rosenblatt, world middleweight champion
- Maxie Rosenbloom, world light-heavyweight champion, HoF
- Barney Ross, world lightweight and welterweight champion, HoF
- Mike Rossman, world light-heavyweight champion
- Dmitriy Salita, Brooklyn boxer, born April 4, 1982
- Corporal Izzy Schwartz, world flyweight champion
- Abe Simon, last Jewish contender for world heavyweight title
- Al Singer, world lightweight champion, HoF
- Lew Tendler, "greatest southpaw in ring history", HoF
- Benny Valger, nicknamed "The French Flash"

== Equestrian ==
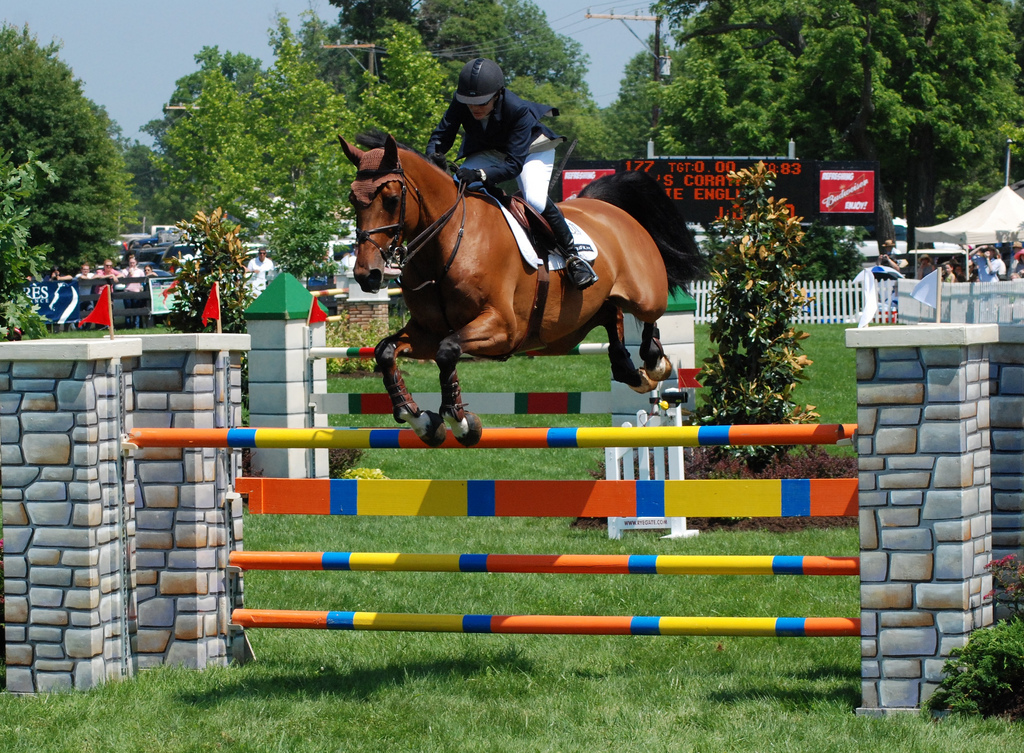
Margie Goldstein-Engle

- Robert Dover, 4x Olympic bronze, 1x world championship bronze (dressage)
- Margie Goldstein-Engle, world championship silver, Pan American Games gold, silver, and bronze (jumping)
- Edith Master, Olympic bronze (dressage)

== Fencing ==
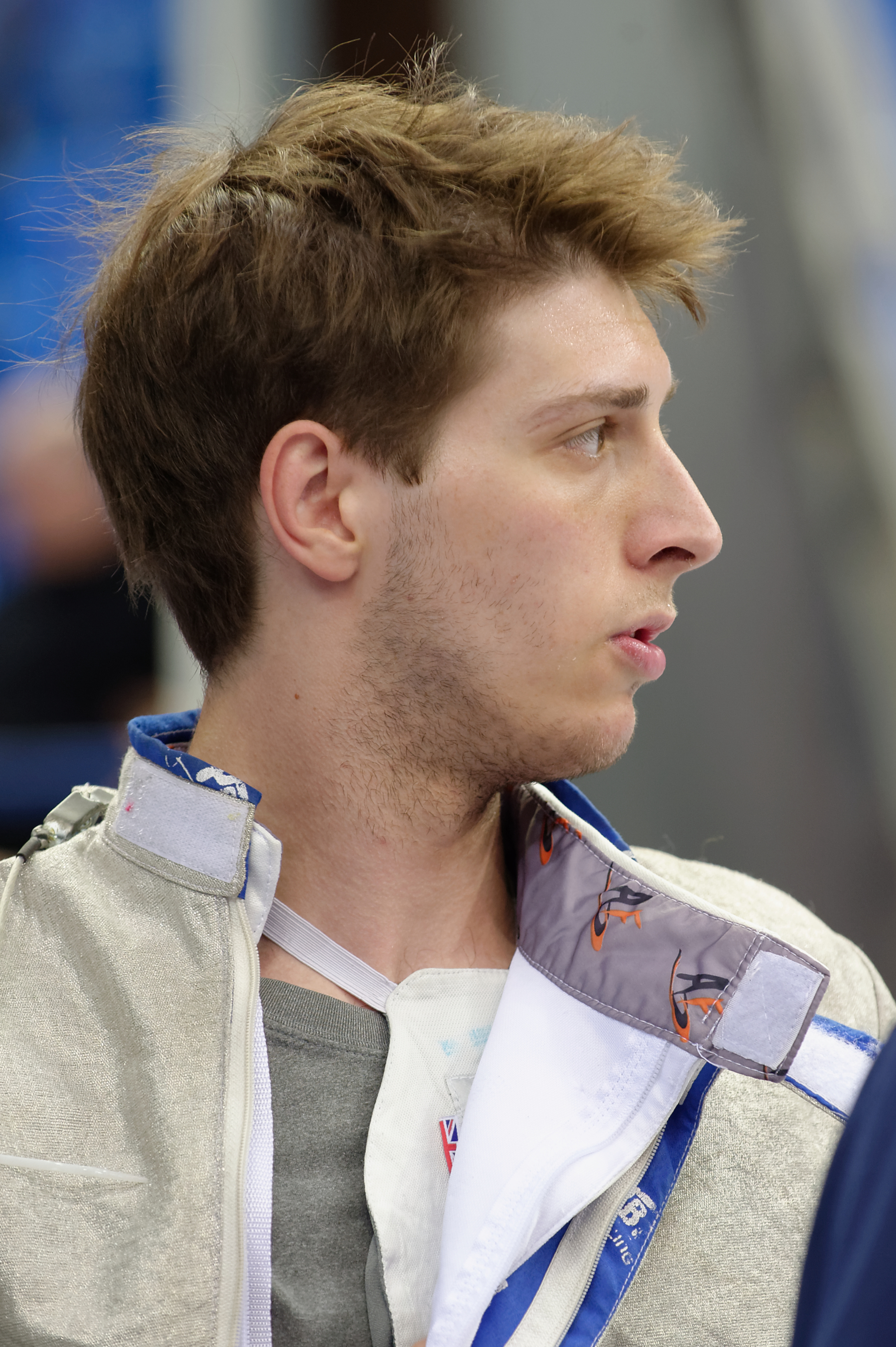
Eli Dershwitz

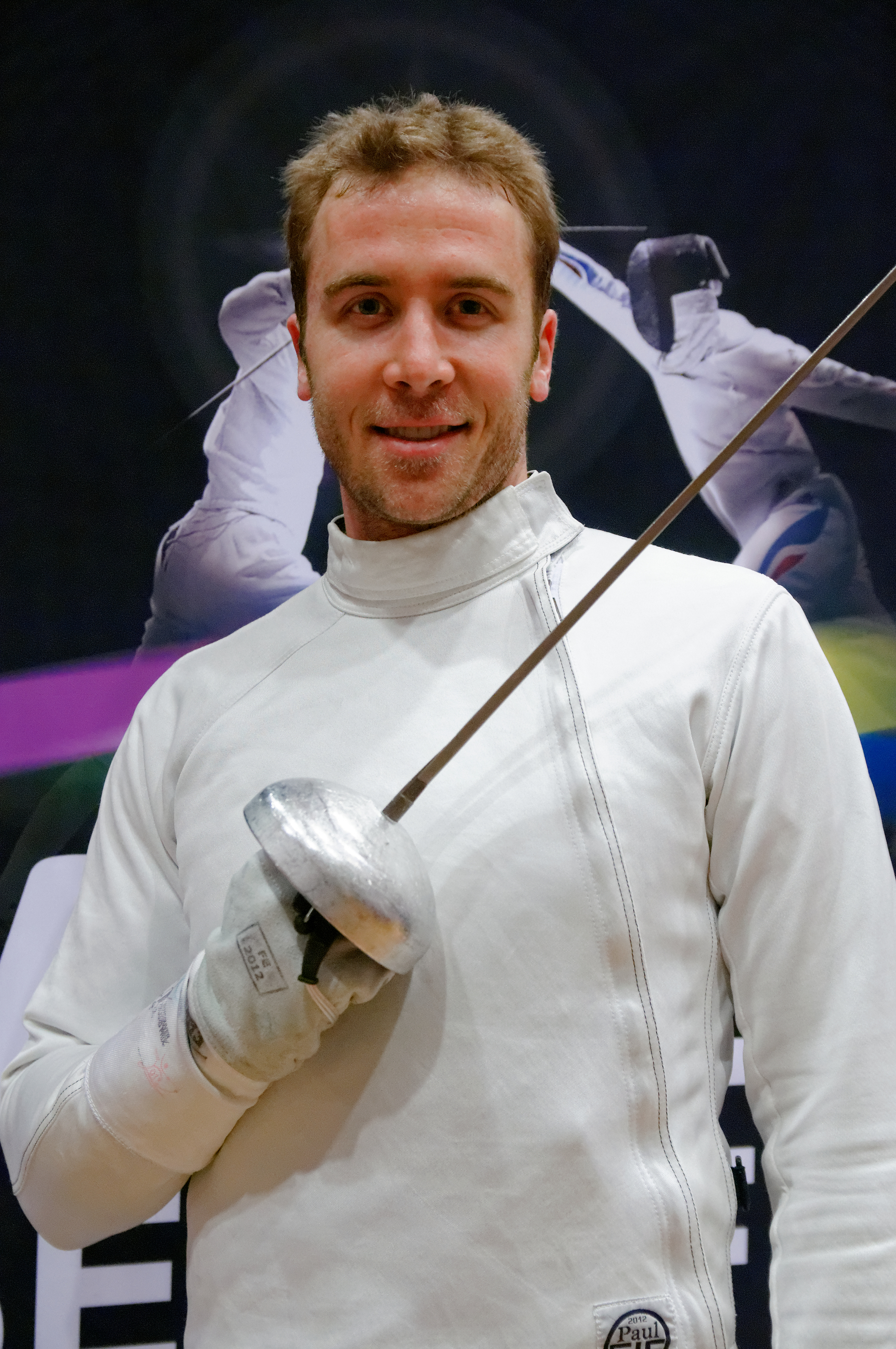
Soren Thompson

- Norman Armitage, fencer; ten-time US sabre champion
- Albert Axelrod, fencer; four-time US foil champion, and Olympic bronze medalist
- Cliff Bayer, fencer; four-time US foil champion
- Tamir Bloom, fencer; two-time US epee champion
- Daniel Bukantz, fencer; four-time US foil champion; gold medalist in 1950 Maccabiah Games
- Eli Dershwitz, fencer; 2023 World Sabre Champion
- Emily Jacobson, fencer; 2004 Women's World Sabre Junior Champion
- Sada Jacobson, fencer; Olympic bronze medalist; ranked #1 in the world in 2004
- Dan Kellner, fencer; one-time US foil champion
- Byron Krieger, (foil, saber, épée), 2x Olympian, Pan American Games team gold/silver
- Allan Kwartler, fencer; gold medalist in the Pan American Games (sabre) and Maccabiah Games (sabre and foil)
- Soren Thompson (épée), NCAA champion, world team champion
- Jonathan Tiomkin, fencer; two-time US foil champion
- George Worth, fencer; one-time US sabre champion; Olympic bronze and silver medalist

== American football ==
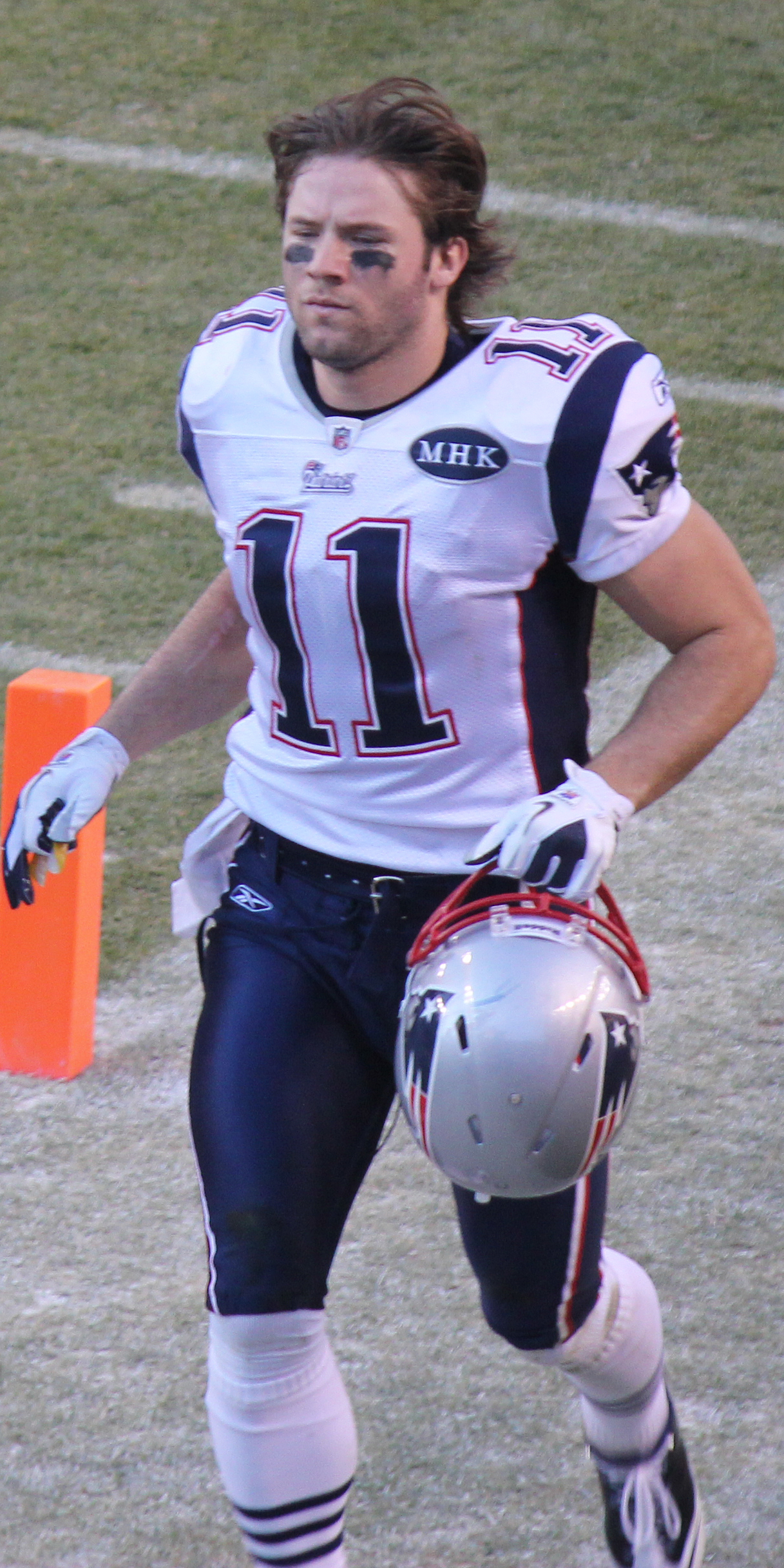
Julian Edelman

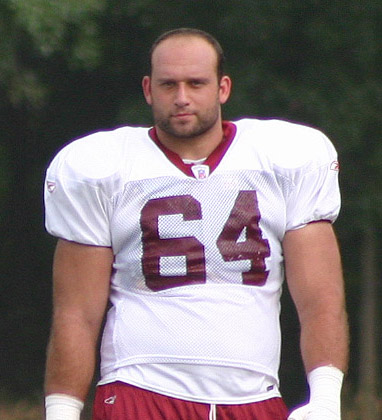
Lennie Friedman

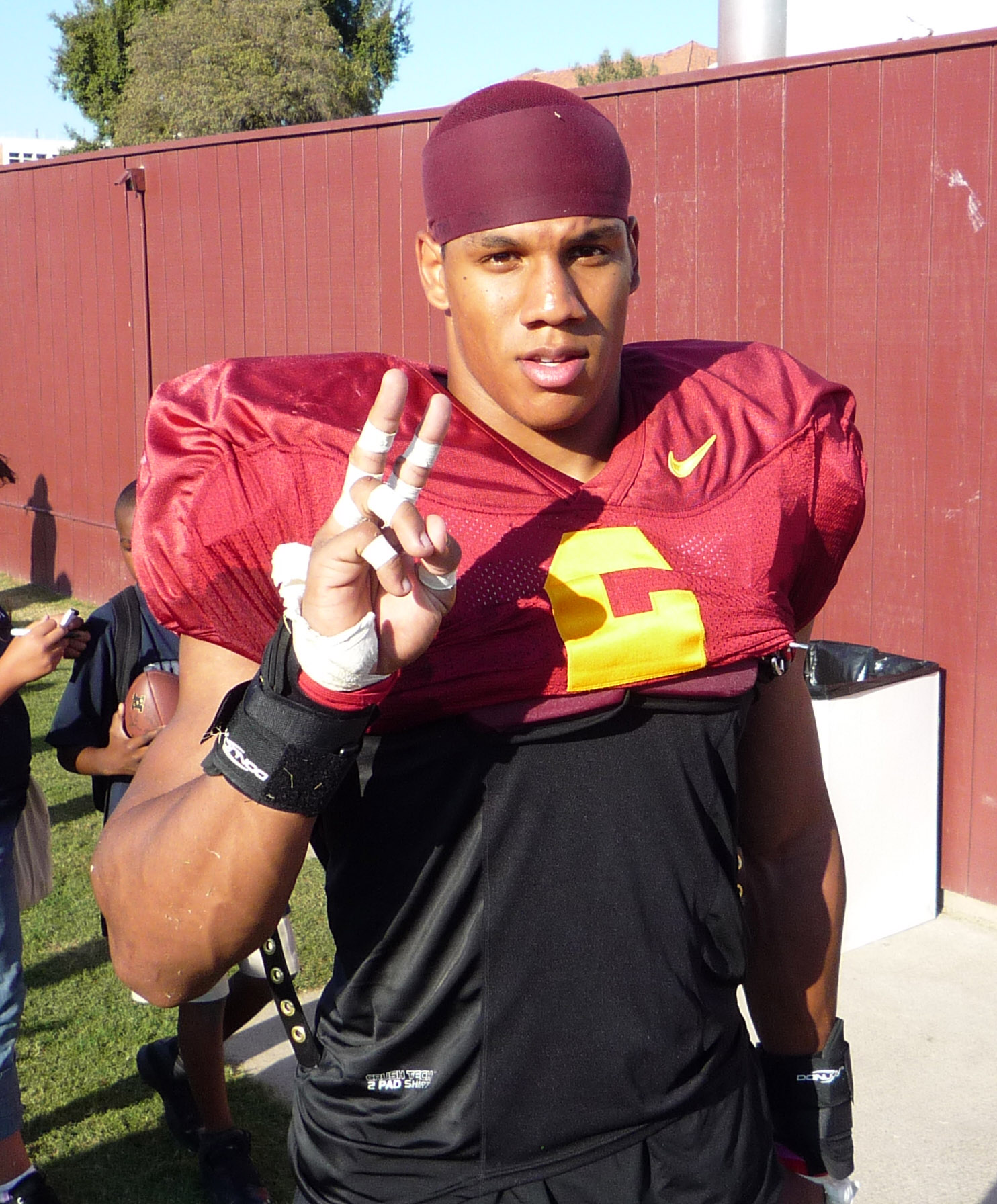
Taylor Mays

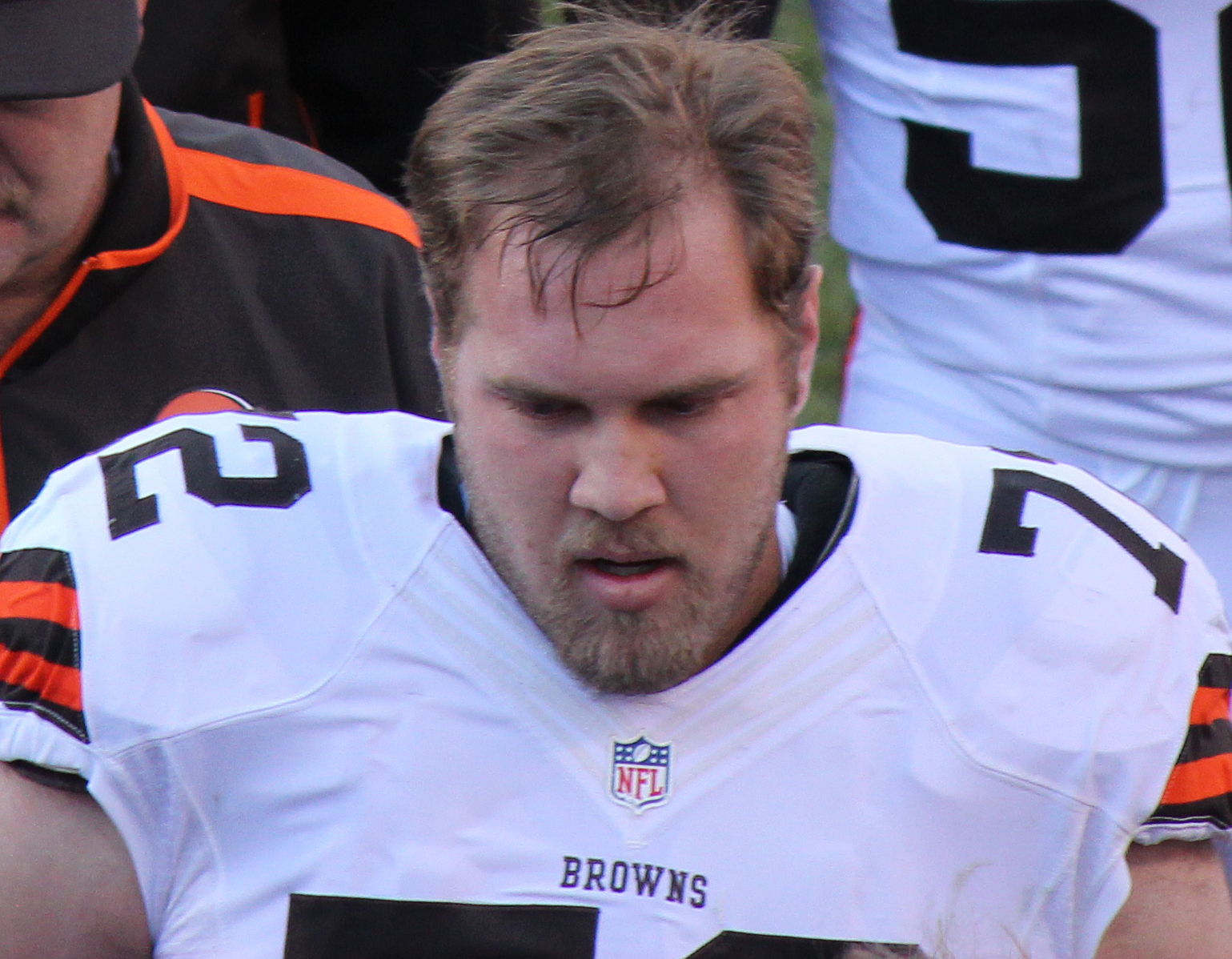
Mitchell Schwartz

=== Players ===
- Doc Alexander, G, All-Pro, College Football Hall of Fame (CFHoF)
- Lyle Alzado, DE, two-time All-Pro
- Harris Barton, OL, two-time All-Pro
- Alex Bernstein, OL
- David Binn, long snapper, San Diego Chargers
- Jeremy Bloom, WR, PR
- Matt Bloom, G, T
- Arthur Bluethenthal, C
- Greg Camarillo, WR, Minnesota Vikings
- Gabe Carimi, OT, Chicago Bears
- Irv Constantine, B, Staten Island Stapletons
- Al Cornsweet, Cleveland Browns
- Julian Edelman, WR, New England Patriots
- Jay Fiedler, QB
- Colin Ritter, P
- John Frank, TE
- Benny Friedman, QB, four-time All-Pro, Hall of Fame, CFHoF
- Lennie Friedman, OL, Cleveland Browns
- Antonio Garay, DT, San Diego Chargers
- Adam Goldberg, OG, St. Louis Rams
- Bill Goldberg, DT
- Marshall Goldberg, RB, All-Pro, CFHoF
- Charles "Buckets" Goldenberg, G and RB, All-Pro
- Randy Grossman, TE, Pittsburgh Steelers
- Phil Handler, G, three-time All-Pro
- Sigmund Harris, QB
- Mark Herzlich, LB, New York Giants
- Greg Joseph, K
- Andrew Kline, OG
- Kyle Kosier, G, Dallas Cowboys
- Len Levy, G
- Benny Lom
- Erik Lorig, FB/TE, Tampa Bay Buccaneers
- Sid Luckman, QB, 8-time All-Pro, Hall of Fame, CFHoF
- Taylor Mays, S, Cincinnati Bengals
- Sam McCullum, WR
- Josh Miller, punter
- Ron Mix, OT, nine-time All-Pro, Hall of Fame
- Ed Newman, G, All-Pro
- Harry Newman, QB, All-Pro
- Igor Olshansky, DE
- Adam Podlesh, punter
- Merv Pregulman, T and C
- Herb Rich, safety, All-Pro
- Josh Rosen, QB, Miami Dolphins
- Sage Rosenfels, QB, New York Giants
- Mike Rosenthal, OT
- Jack Sack, All-Pro
- Geoff Schwartz, OT, New York Giants
- Mitchell Schwartz. OT
- Mike Seidman, TE, Indianapolis Colts
- Allie Sherman, running back and coach
- Saul "Solly" Sherman, Chicago Bears, QB, 1939 and 1940
- Scott Slutzker, TE
- Josh Taves, DE
- Andre Tippett, LB, five-time All Pro, Hall of Fame (converted to Judaism)
- Alan Veingrad, OL
- Gary Wood, New York Giants QB

=== Coaches ===
- Al Cornsweet, coach Cleveland Browns 1931
- Jedd Fisch, head coach of the University of Washington Huskies
- Sid Gillman, coach, PFHoF, CFHoF
- Phil Handler, head coach of the Chicago Cardinals
- Tony Levine, head coach of the Houston Cougars
- Marv Levy, coach, PFHoF
- Allie Sherman, former head coach of the New York Giants
- Marc Trestman, former head coach of the Chicago Bears

=== Owners and executives ===
- David Tepper, Carolina Panthers owner (2018–present)
- Arthur Blank, Atlanta Falcons owner (2002–present)
- Al Davis, Oakland Raiders owner (1966–2011)
- Mark Davis, Oakland / Las Vegas Raiders owner (2011–present)
- Malcolm Glazer, Tampa Bay Buccaneers owner (1995–present)
- Josh Harris, Washington Commanders owner (2023–present)
- Eugene V. Klein, San Diego Chargers owner (1966–1984)
- Robert Kraft, New England Patriots owner (1994–present)
- Randy Lerner, Cleveland Browns owner (2002–2012)
- Jeffrey Lurie, Philadelphia Eagles owner (1995–present)
- Art Modell, Cleveland Browns owner (1961–1995), Baltimore Ravens owner (1995–2004)
- Carroll Rosenbloom, Baltimore Colts owner (1953–1972), Los Angeles Rams owner (1972–1979)
- Stephen M. Ross, Miami Dolphins owner (2008–present)
- Daniel Snyder, Washington Redskins / Commanders owner (1999–2023)
- Steve Tisch, New York Giants owner (2005–present)
- Sonny Werblin, New York Jets owner (1965–1968)
- Zygi Wilf, Minnesota Vikings owner
- Steve Cohen, New York Mets owner (2020-present)

=== Officials ===
- Jerry Markbreit, line judge (1976) and referee (1977–98); only official to serve as referee in four Super Bowls (XVII, XXI, XXVI, XXIX)

== Golf ==
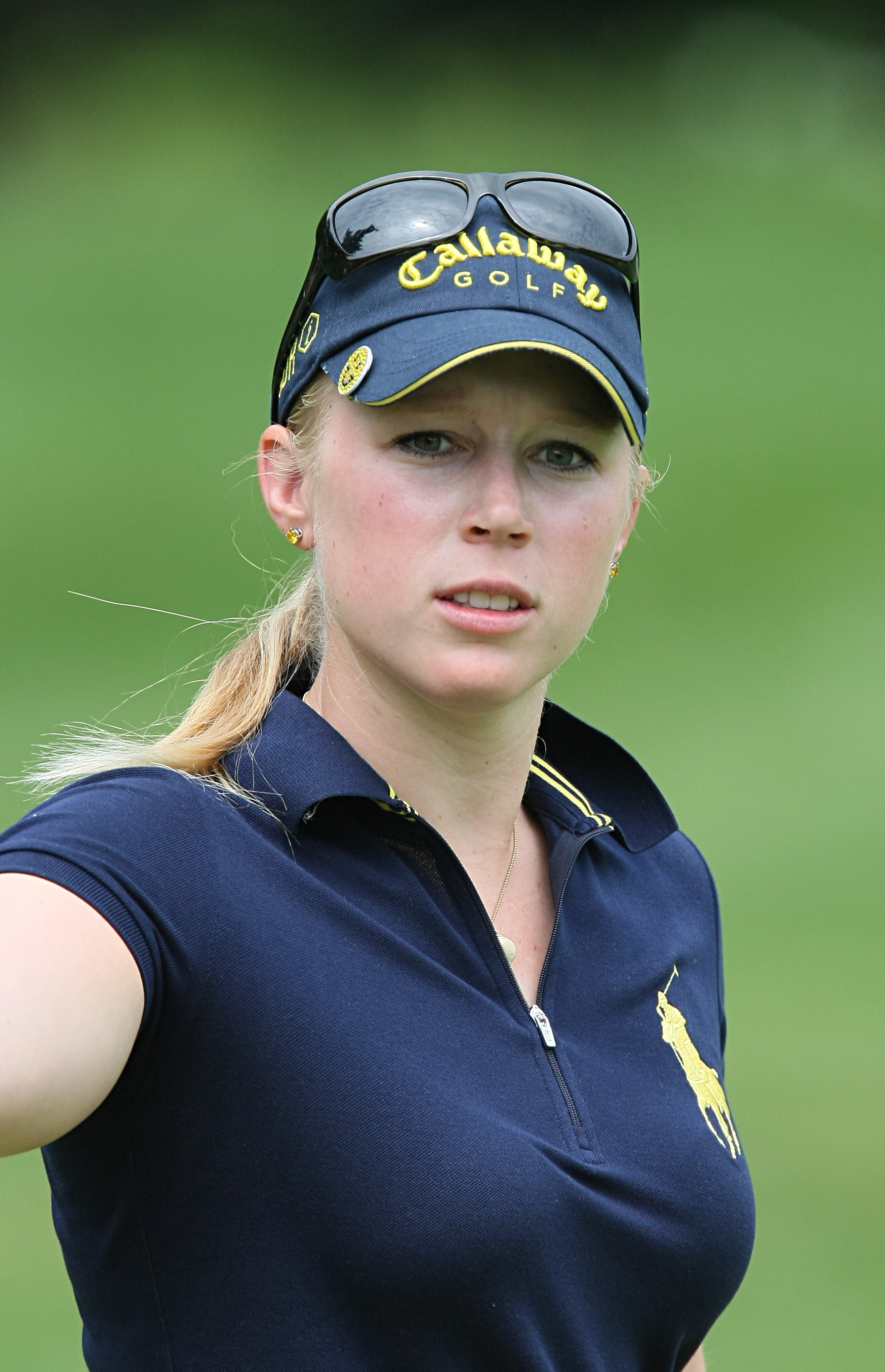
Morgan Pressel

- Amy Alcott, LPGA Tour, World Golf Hall of Fame
- Herman Barron, PGA Tour
- Daniel Berger, PGA Tour
- Bruce Fleisher, PGA Tour
- Jonathan Kaye, PGA Tour
- David Lipsky, Asian Tour
- Corey Pavin, PGA & Champions Tour (converted to Christianity)
- Morgan Pressel, LPGA Tour
- Monte Scheinblum, 1992 US and World Long Drive Champion
- Ron Silver, Nationwide Tour
- Patrick Rodgers, PGA Tour

== Gymnastics ==
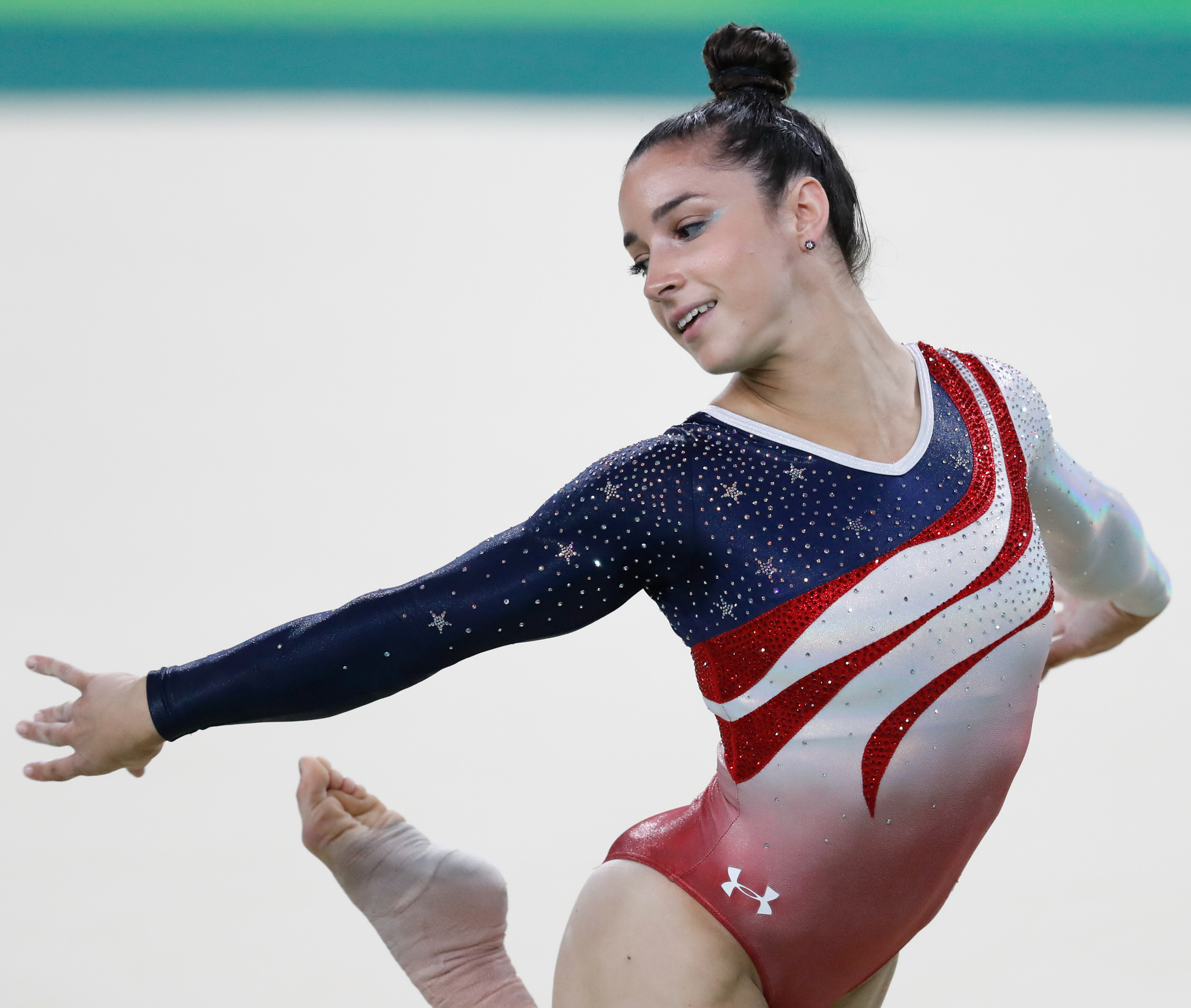
Aly Raisman

- Alyssa Beckerman, national champion (balance beam), 2 silver & bronze (uneven bars)
- Philip Erenberg, Olympic silver (Indian clubs)
- Mitch Gaylord, Olympic champion (team), silver (vaulting), 2x bronze (rings, parallel bars)
- Abie Grossfeld, 8 time Pan American champion, 7x Maccabiah champion, coach
- George Gulack, Olympic champion (flying rings)
- Phoebe Mills, Olympic bronze (balance beam)
- Aly Raisman, Olympic champion (floor, team combined exercises in 2012 and 2016), silver (all-around), bronze (balance beam); world gold (team: 2011, 2015), silver (team: 2010), and bronze (floor exercise: 2011)
- Kerri Strug, Olympic champion (team combined exercises), bronze (team combined exercises)
- Julie Zetlin, 2010 US champion (rhythmic gymnastics)
- Valerie Zimring, 1984 US National Champion, 5 time Maccabiah Champion (rhythmic gymnastics)

== Ice hockey ==
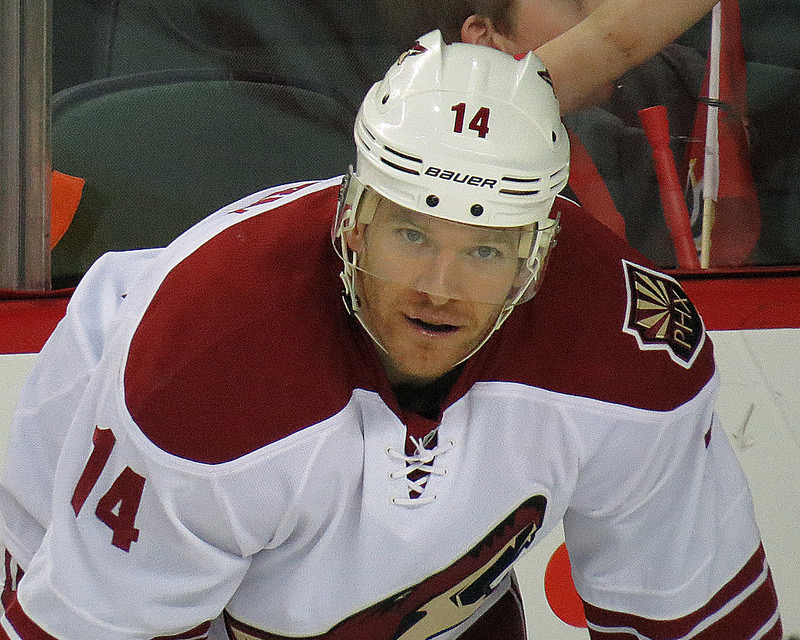
Jeff Halpern

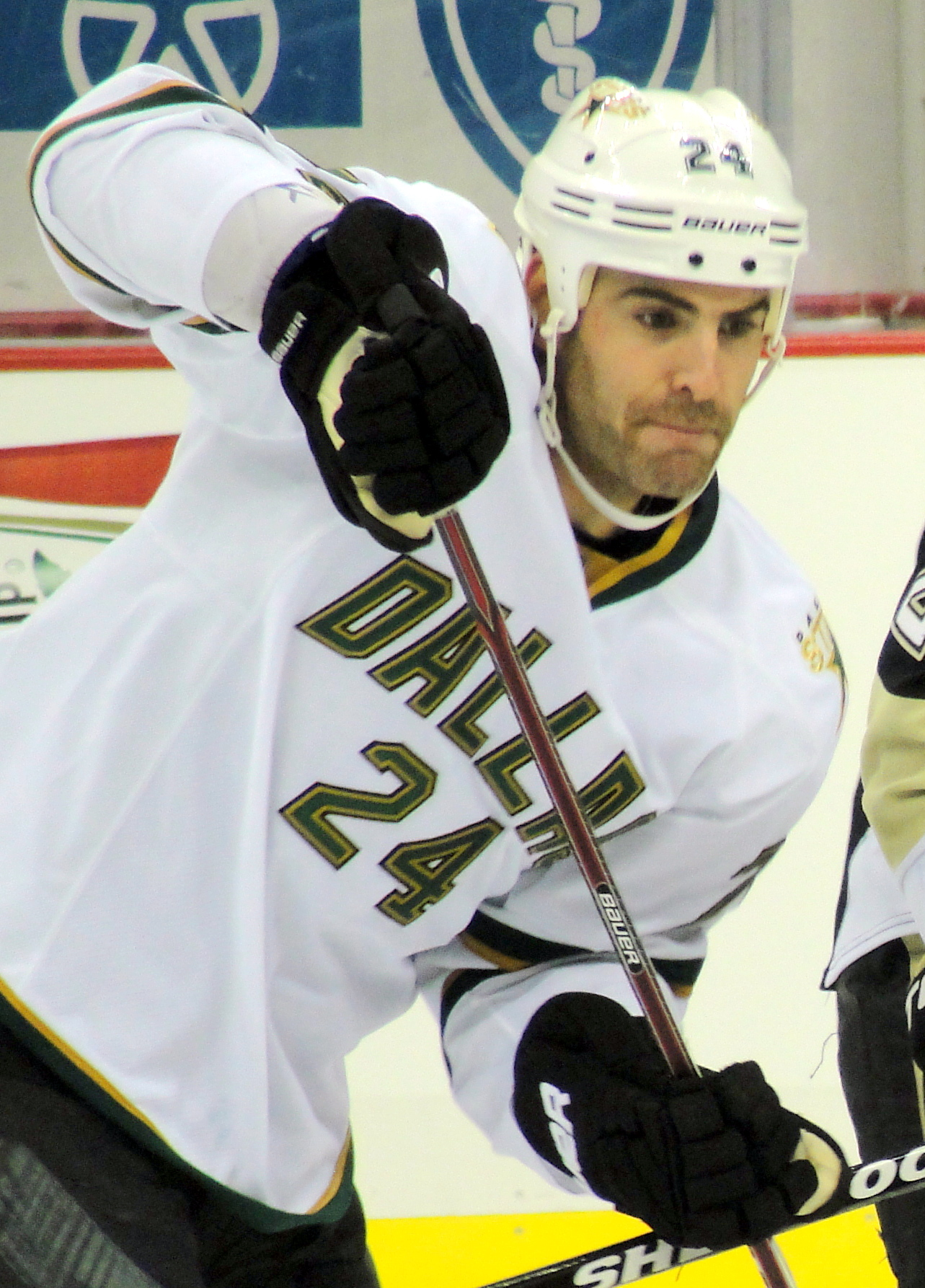
Eric Nystrom

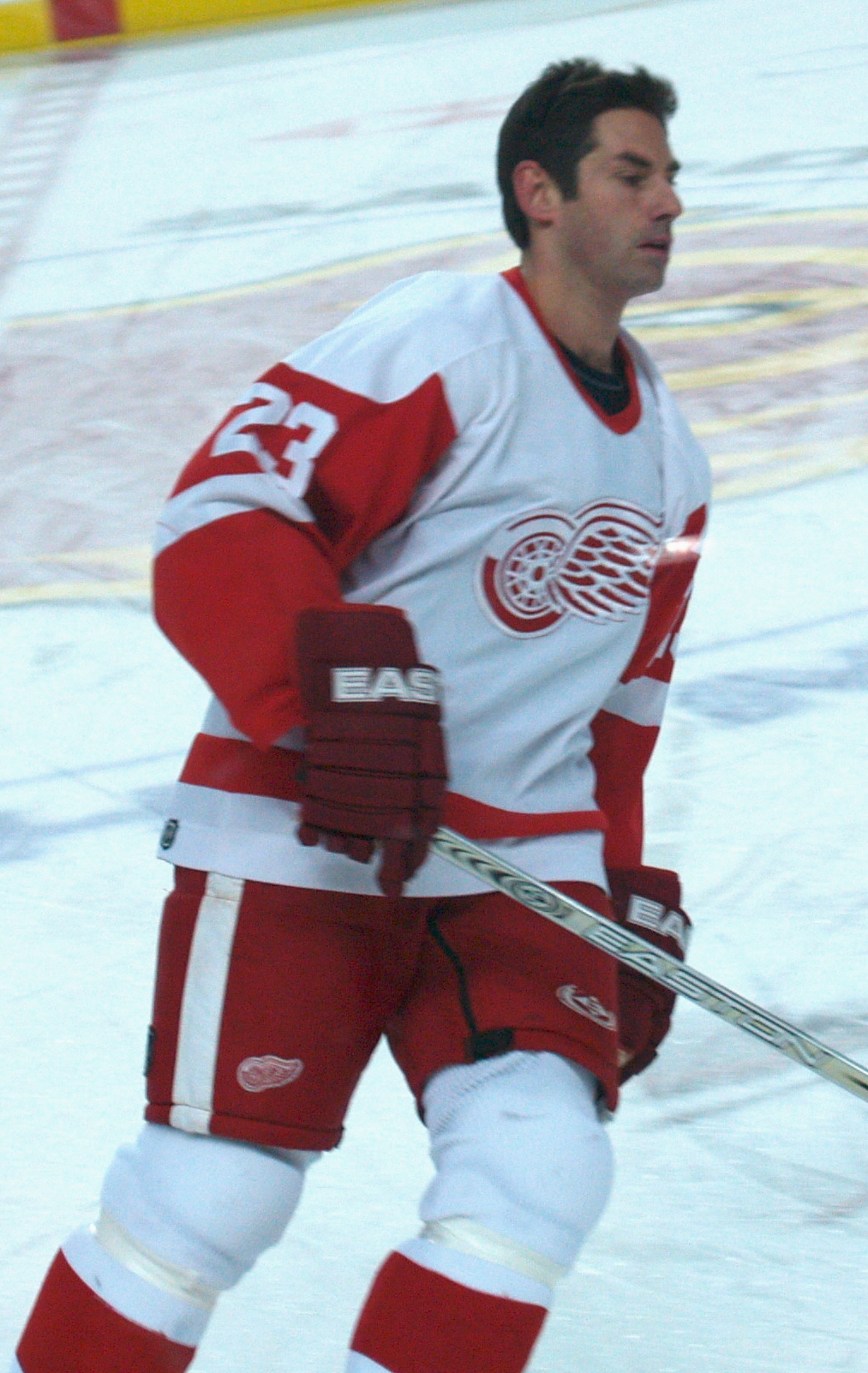
Mathieu Schneider

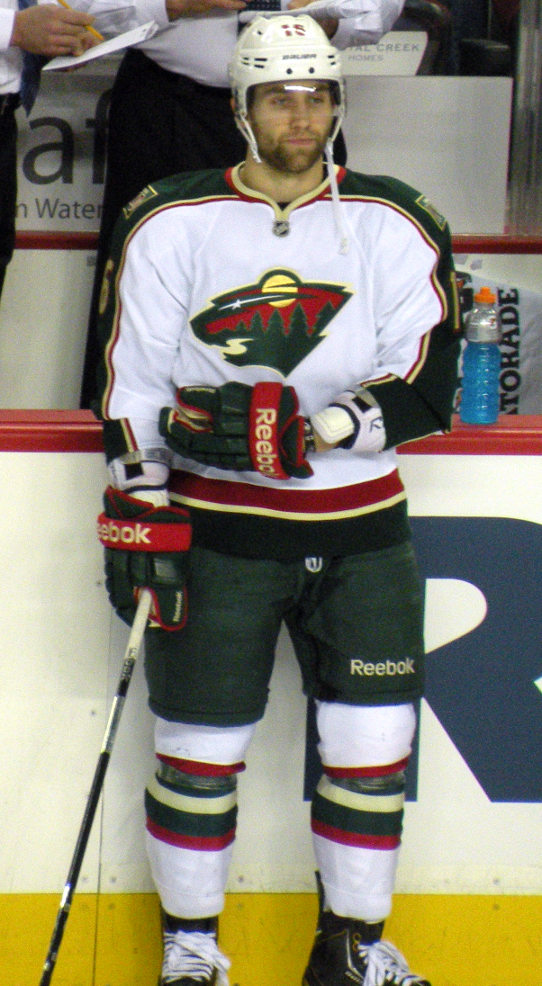
Jason Zucker

- Mike Brown, right wing
- Hy Buller, Canadian-born US, All-Star defenceman (NHL)
- Carter Camper, forward
- Colby Cohen, defenseman
- Corey Crawford, goaltender (Chicago Blackhawks)
- Sara DeCosta, goaltender (US national team)
- Adam Fox, defenseman (New York Rangers)
- Aerin Frankel, goaltender (Boston Fleet)
- Dov Grumet-Morris, goaltender (Hartford Wolf Pack)
- Jeff Halpern, center (Phoenix Coyotes)
- Mike Hartman, left wing (NHL)
- Jack Hughes, center (New Jersey Devils)
- Luke Hughes, defenseman (New Jersey Devils)
- Quinn Hughes, defenseman (Vancouver Canucks)
- Evan Kaufmann, forward (Nürnberg Ice Tigers)
- Luke Kunin, centre (San Jose Sharks)
- Eric Nystrom, left wing (Nashville Predators) & son of former NHL player Bob Nystrom
- Dylan Reese, defenseman (Amur Khabarovsk)
- Mathieu Schneider, defenseman (NHL)
- Brett Sterling, left wing
- Jason Zucker, left wing (Pittsburgh Penguins)

== Motor sports ==
- Kenny Bernstein, drag racer
- Paul Newman, auto racer and team owner
- Peter Revson, F1 racer
- Mauri Rose, Indy 500 racer

== Power sports ==
- Isaac Berger, Olympic weightlifter (1g2s)
- Matt Bloom, professional wrestler
- Colt Cabana, professional wrestler
- Abe Coleman, professional wrestler
- Maxwell Jacob Friedman, professional wrestler
- Bill Goldberg, professional wrestler
- Royce Isaacs, professional wrestler
- Kelly Kelly (Barbie Blank), professional wrestler
- Butch Levy, professional wrestler
- Scott Levy, professional wrestler
- Dean Malenko, professional wrestler
- Lanny Poffo, professional wrestler
- Randy Savage, professional wrestler
- Izzy Slapawitz, professional wrestler and manager
- Henry Wittenberg, Olympic wrestler (1g1s)

== Rugby union ==
- Samuel Goodman, manager of the gold winning US Olympic rugby, 1920, 1924.
- Shawn Lipman
- Zack Test

== Skating ==
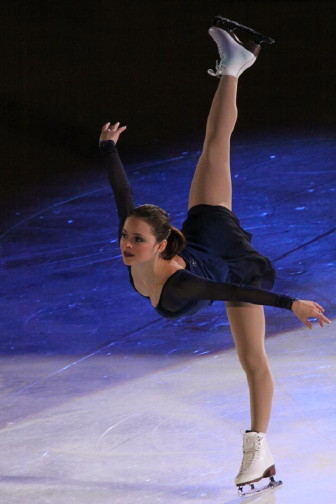
Sasha Cohen

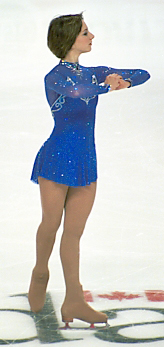
Sarah Hughes

- Benjamin Agosto, ice dancer
- Judy Blumberg, US ice dancer, World Championship three-time bronze
- Cindy Bortz, figure skater, World Junior Champion
- Sasha Cohen, figure skater, reigning US Figure Skating Champion and Olympic silver
- Amber Corwin, figure skater
- Loren Galler-Rabinowitz, ice dancer, competes with partner David Mitchell; US Championships bronze
- Melissa Gregory, figure skater, ice dancer with Denis Petukhov, US Championships three silvers, two bronze
- Emily Hughes, figure skater, World Junior Figure Skating Championships bronze, US Championships bronze, silver
- Sarah Hughes, figure skater, Olympic gold, World Championship bronze (Jewish mother)
- Ronald Joseph, figure skater, US Junior Champion, US Championships gold, two-time silver, and bronze, World Championship silver, bronze
- Vivian Joseph, figure skater, US Junior Champion, US Championships gold, two-time silver, and bronze, World Championship silver, bronze
- Michael Seibert, ice dancer, US Figure Skating Championships five-time gold, World Figure Skating Championships three-time bronze
- Jamie Silverstein, figure skater, ice dancer with Ryan O'Meara, US Championships bronze

== Soccer (association football) ==
- Ryan Adeleye, US/Israel, defender (Hapoel Be'er Sheva)
- Jeff Agoos, defender (national team)
- Al Albert, college soccer coach
- Kyle Altman, defender
- Yael Averbuch, midfielder (Sky Blue FC and women's national team)
- Rhett Bernstein, defender
- Jonathan Bornstein, left back/midfielder (Chicago Fire FC and national team)
- Dan Calichman, defender
- Benny Feilhaber, Brazil/US center/attacking midfielder (AGF Aarhus and US national team)
- Don Garber, commissioner
- Avram Glazer, co-chairman, Manchester United
- Joel Glazer, co-chairman, Manchester United
- Malcolm Glazer, owner, Manchester United
- Eddy Hamel, right winger (AFC Ajax; was killed by the Nazis in Auschwitz)
- Shep Messing, goalkeeper (national team), manager, and sportscaster
- Charlie Reiter, forward (Richmond Kickers)
- Dave Sarachan, forward
- Sara Whalen, defender/forward, Olympic silver
- Ethan Zohn
- DeAndre Yedlin (soccer player, Miami FC)

== Swimming ==
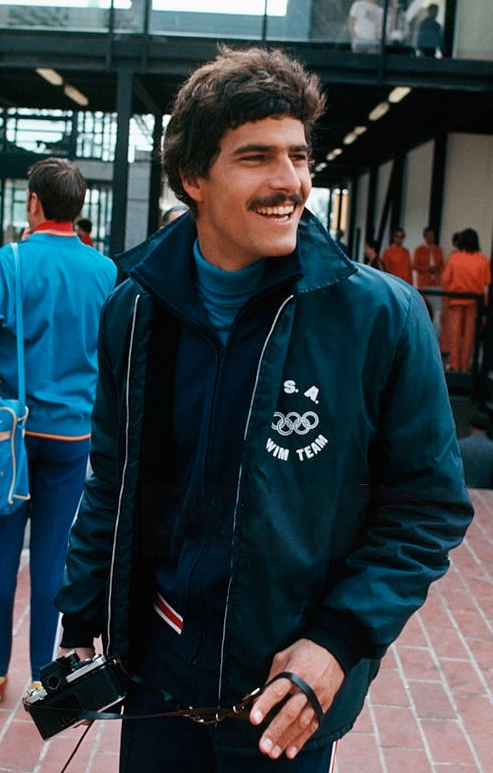
Mark Spitz

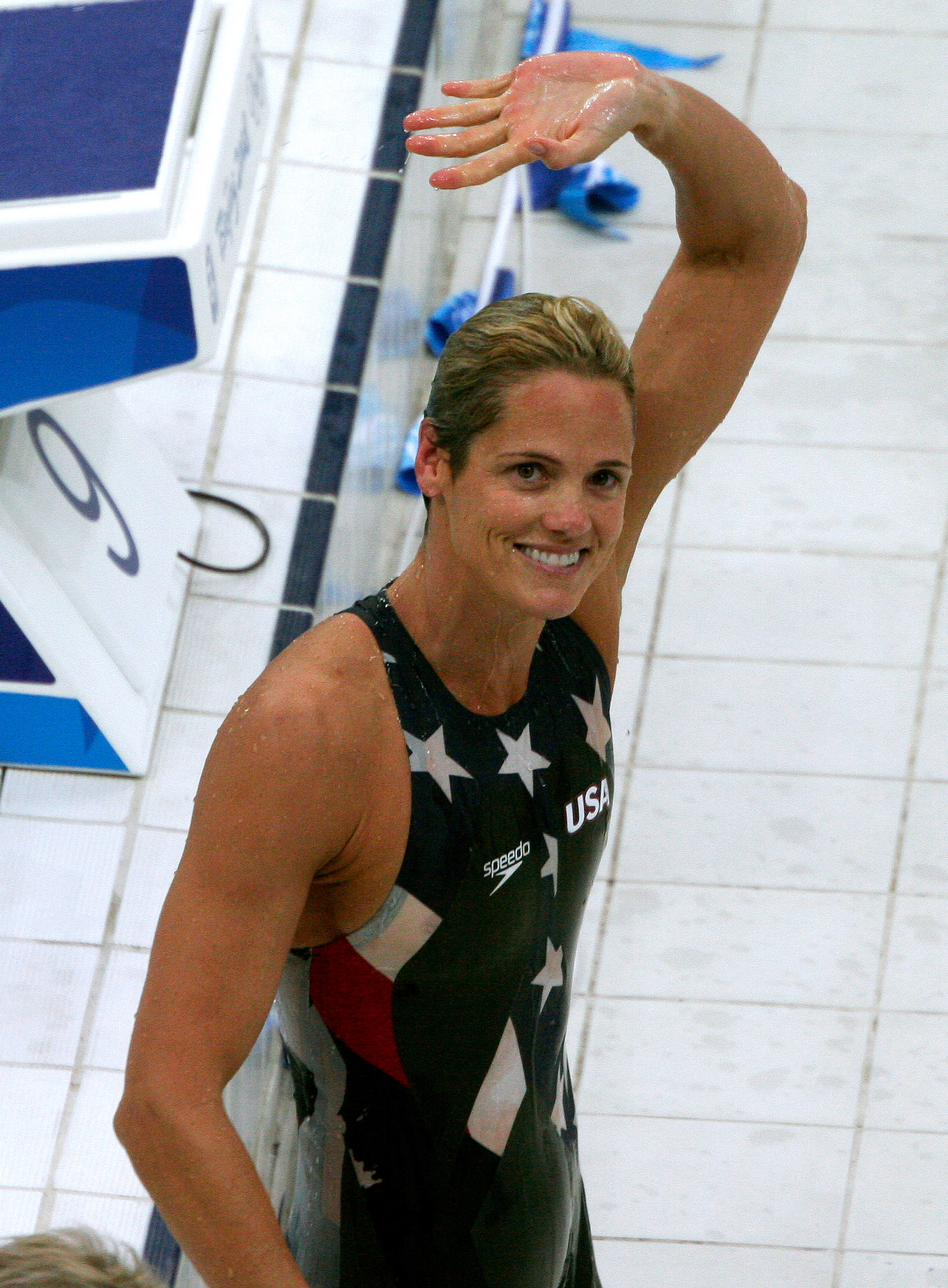
Dara Torres

- Tiffany Cohen, Olympic swimmer (2g; 400-meter and 800-meter freestyle)
- Anthony Ervin, Olympic swimmer (3g1s)
- Scott Goldblatt, US Olympic champion (4X200 freestyle relay), silver (800 m. freestyle relay)
- Lenny Krayzelburg, Four time Olympic champion
- Dan Kutler, US-born Israeli
- Jason Lezak, Olympic swimmer (4g1s2b)
- Marilyn Ramenofsky, US Olympic silver (400-meter freestyle)
- Keena Rothhammer, Olympic swimmer (1g1b)
- Albert Schwartz, US Olympic bronze (100-meter freestyle)
- Mark Spitz (1950–), Olympic swimmer (9g1s1b),
- Dara Torres, Olympic swimmer (4g4s4b)
- Garrett Weber-Gale, Olympic swimmer (2g)
- Wendy Weinberg, US Olympic bronze (800-meter freestyle)
- Ben Wildman-Tobriner, Olympic swimmer (1g)

== Tennis ==
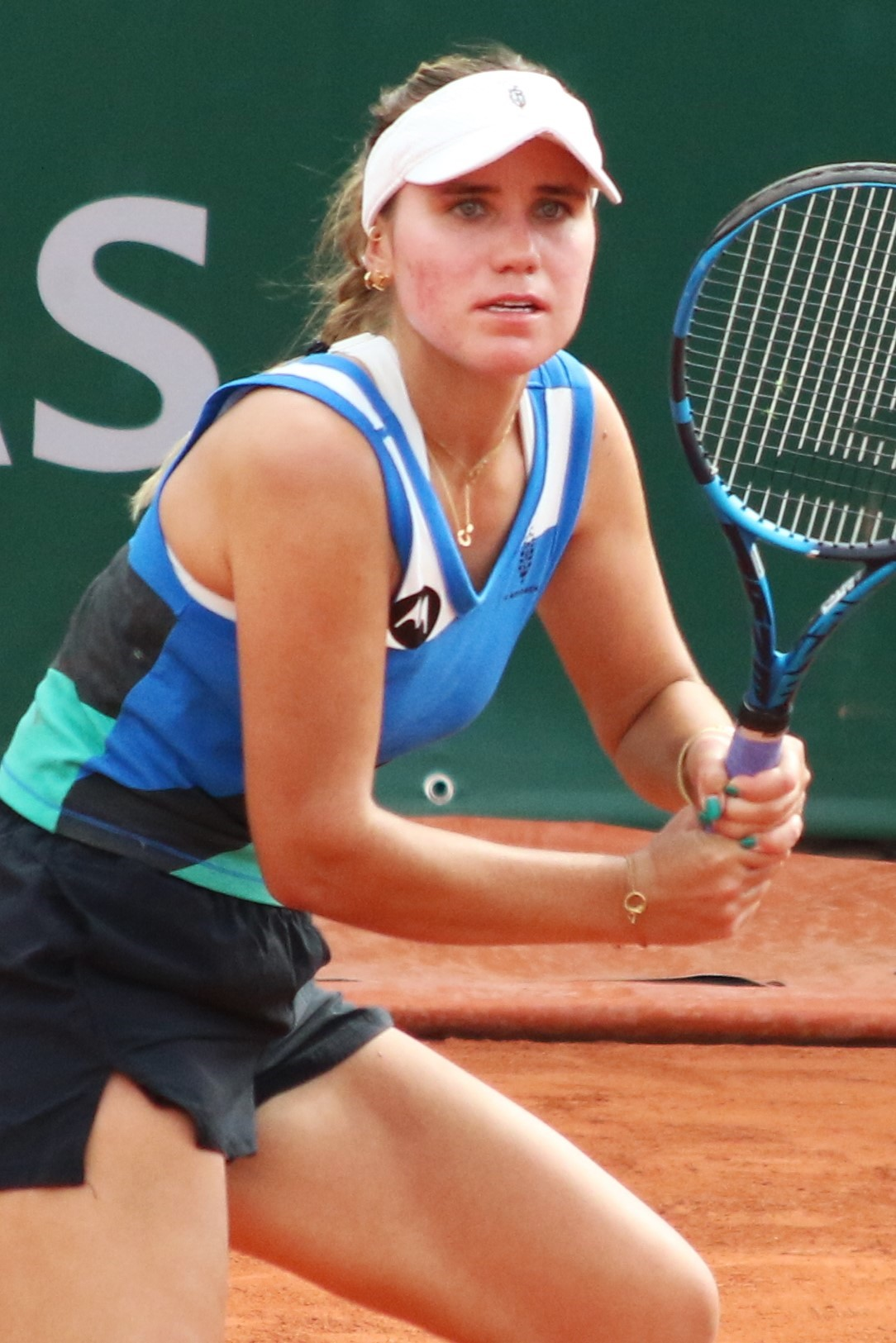
Sofia Kenin

- Jay Berger, tennis player; USTA boys' 18s singles champion, highest world ranking #7; coach
- Madison Brengle
- Audra Cohen, 2007 NCAA Women's Singles Champion
- Julia Cohen, USTA girls' 12s and 18s singles champion
- Mark Ein, doubles tennis player and businessman
- Herbert Flam, two-time USTA boys' 18s singles champion, highest world ranking #5
- Zack Fleishman, tennis player
- Brad Gilbert, tennis player; highest world ranking #4, Olympic bronze (singles); coach<
- Justin Gimelstob, tennis player; USTA boys' 16s and 18s singles champion, won 1998 Australian Open Mixed Doubles (with Venus Williams) and 1998 French Open Mixed Doubles (with Venus Williams)
- Paul Goldstein, tennis player; USTA boys' 16s and two-time 18s singles champion
- Brian Gottfried, tennis player; USTA boys' 12s and two-time 18s singles champion, won 1975 and 1977 French Open Men's Doubles (with Raúl Ramírez), and 1976 Wimbledon Men's Doubles (with Ramirez), highest world ranking #3
- Jim Grabb, doubles tennis player; won 1989 French Open Men's Doubles (with Richey Reneberg) and 1992 US Open Men's Doubles (with Patrick McEnroe), highest world doubles ranking #1
- Julie Heldman, US girls' 15s and 18s singles champion, highest world ranking #5
- Anita Kanter, US girls' 18s singles champion
- Sofia Kenin, 2020 Australia Open women's singles champion.
- Aaron Krickstein, tennis player; USTA boys' 16s and 18s singles champion, highest world ranking #6
- Steve Krulevitz, tennis player; Maccabbi Champion
- Jesse Levine, tennis player
- Wayne Odesnik
- Richard Savitt, tennis player
- Julius Seligson, two-time boys' 18s singles champion
- Harold Solomon, tennis player; US boys' 18s singles champion, highest world ranking #5
- Brian Teacher, US boys' 18s singles champion, won 1980 Australian Open Singles, highest world ranking #7
- Eliot Teltscher, won 1983 French Open Mixed Doubles (with Barbara Jordan), highest world ranking #6

== Track and field ==
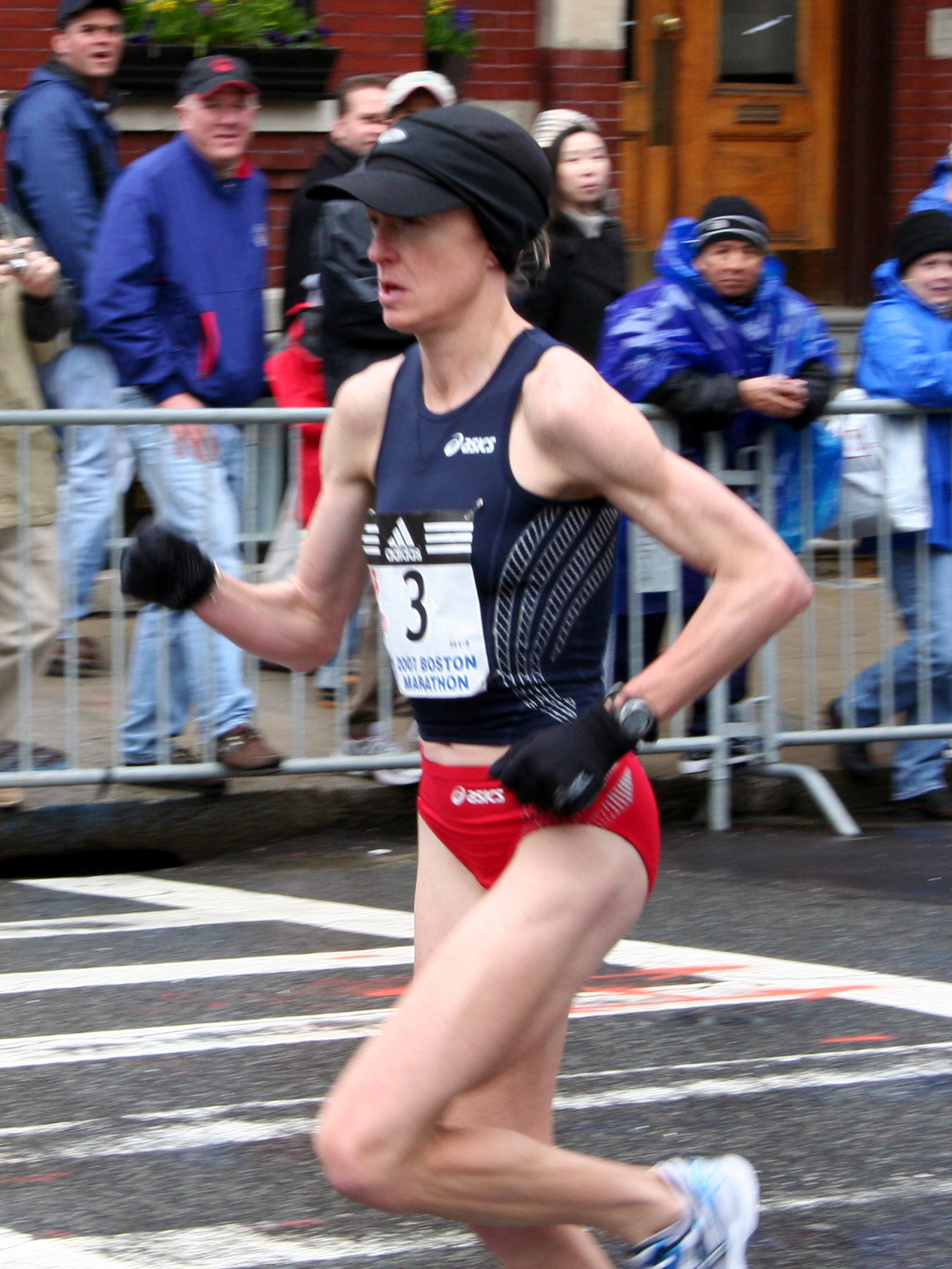
Deena (Drossin) Kastor

- Gerry Ashworth, world record holder in 100 yards, 100 meters; 1964 Olympic track athlete-gold medal
- Louis Clarke, Olympic gold medal, 4X100-meter relay
- Lillian Copeland, world records (javelin, discus throw, and shot put); Olympic champion & silver {discus}
- Daniel Frank, long jump, Olympic silver medal
- Hugo Friend, long jump, Olympic bronze medal
- James Fuchs, shot put & discus, 2x Olympic bronze (shot put); 4x shot put world record holder, 2x Pan American champions (shot put & discus)
- Marty Glickman, sprinter, US Olympic team; All American (football) and sportscaster.
- Milton Green, world record holder in the 45-yard & 60-m high hurdles in the 1930s; was considered sure to make the Olympic team in 1936, but chose not to participate in protest of the event being held in Nazi Germany
- Gary Gubner, world shot put records, weightlifter
- Clare Jacobs, bronze medal, Olympic pole vault, world indoor record
- Deena Kastor, Olympic bronze medalist in marathon 2004 Summer Olympics in Athens; long-distance runner, US records (marathon & half-marathon)
- Abel Kiviat, middle-distance runner
- Margaret Bergmann Lambert, US Champion in high jump, 1937–38, and shot put, 1938; subject of HBO documentary Hitler's Pawn
- Henry Laskau, German-born US racewalker, won 42 national titles; Pan American champion; 4x Maccabiah champion
- Alvah Meyer, silver medal, 100 meter dash, 1912 Olympics, 2 world records (60 y & 300 y).
- Lon Myers, US, sprinter, world records (quarter-mile, 100-yard, 440-yard (400 m), and 880-yard)
- Myer Prinstein, Olympic jumper, world record (long jump); 3x Olympic champion (2x triple jump & long jump) and silver (long jump) (4g1s)
- Steve Seymour, javelin throw, Olympic silver medal
- Sam Stoller, US, world indoor record (60-yard dash)
- Dwight Stones, world record (high jump); 2x Olympic bronze

== Horse racing ==
- Walter Blum, Hall of Fame jockey
- Robert J. Frankel, Hall of Fame trainer
- Willie Harmatz, jockey
- John Hertz, owner and breeder
- Max Hirsch, Hall of Fame trainer
- William J. Hirsch, Hall of Fame trainer
- David Hofmans, trainer
- Hirsch Jacobs, Hall of Fame trainer
- Bruce N. Levine, trainer
- Walter Miller, Hall of Fame jockey
- Howard M. Tesher, trainer
- Martin D. Wolfson, trainer

== Miscellaneous sports ==
- Marv Albert, NBA announcer, New York Knicks, NBA on NBC, NBA on TNT, New Jersey Nets
- Jeremy Bloom, Olympic freestyle skier; model; NFL player
- Walter Blum, jockey
- Lindsey Durlacher, wrestler
- Sidney Franklin, bullfighter
- Alan Gelfand, skateboarder, inventor of the ollie
- Vic Hershkowitz, handball champion
- Marty Hogan, racquetball player
- Marshall Holman, bowling champion
- Jordan Levine, lacrosse player
- Johnny Most, NBA announcer, Boston Celtics
- Sam Munchnick, wrestling promoter and executive
- Victor Niederhoffer, squash player; won 1951 Wimbledon Men's Singles, highest world ranking #2
- Marty Nothstein, cyclist
- Adam Duvendeck, Olympic cyclist
- Bruce Pasternack, former president and CEO of Special Olympics International.
- Mark Roth, bowling champion
- Louis O. Schwartz, President, American Sportscasters Association (ASA); founder, ASA Hall of Fame; Editor, ASA Insiders Sportsletter; former president, Finger Lakes Broadcasting Corp.
- Tamara Statman, softball player and Israeli National Softball Team Member.
- Shaun Tomson, surfer
- Jewish Roller Derby is a diaspora team that competes in international tournaments.

== See also ==
- List of Jews in sports
- List of Jews in sports (non-players)
- List of Jewish Olympic medalists
- International Jewish Sports Hall of Fame
- Jewish Coaches Association

== Jewish sports halls of fame in the United States ==
- National Jewish Sports Hall of Fame and Museum (US)
- Northern California Jewish Sports Hall of Fame
- Southern California Jewish Sports Hall of Fame
- Michigan Jewish Sports Hall of Fame
- Rochester Jewish Sports Hall of Fame (NY)
- St. Louis Jewish Sports Hall of Fame
- Philadelphia Jewish Sports Hall of Fame (Pennsylvania)
