= Wally Szczerbiak =

American basketball player (born 1977)

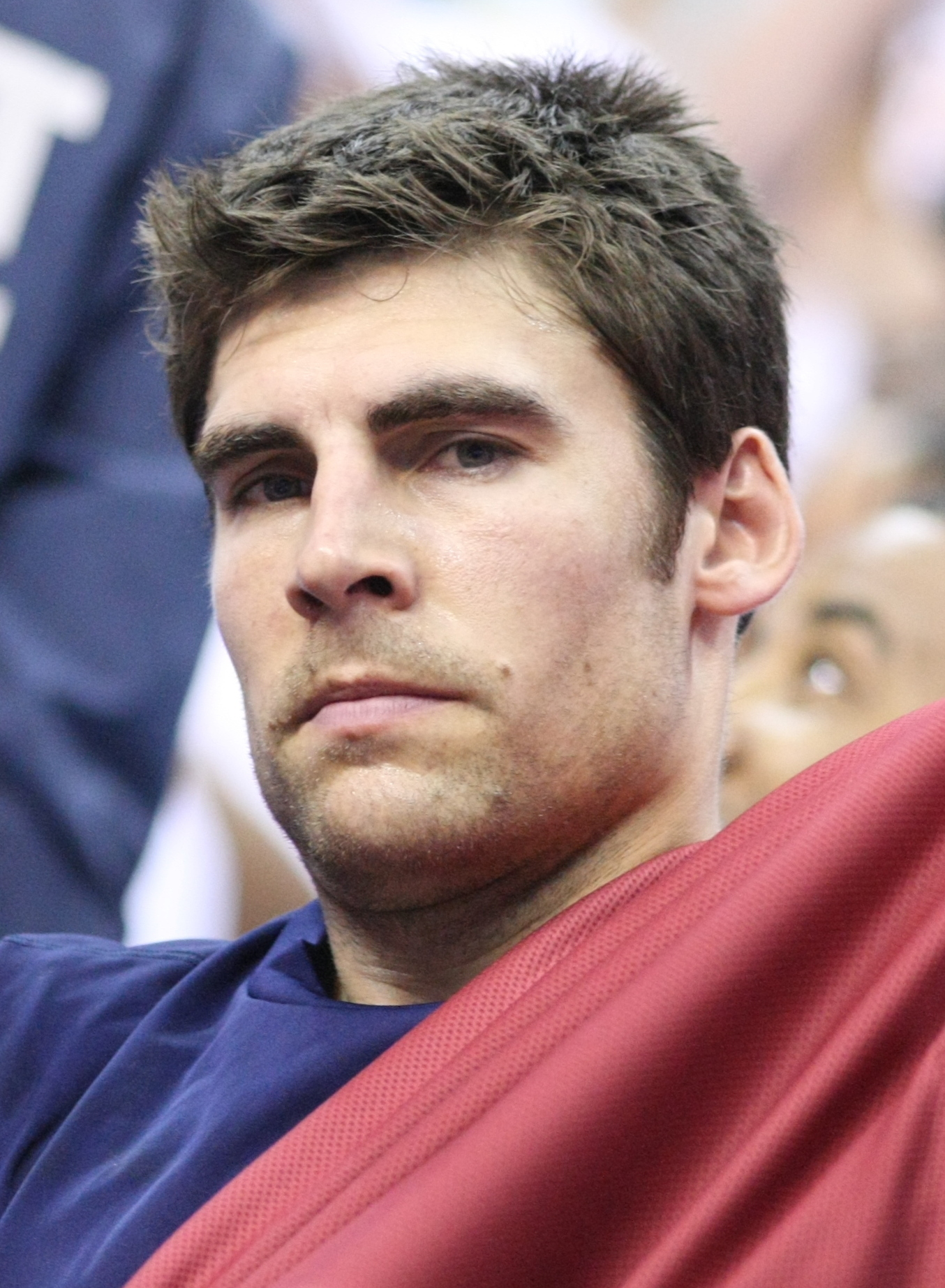
- Szczerbiak with the Cleveland Cavaliers in 2008

Personal information
- Born: March 5, 1977 (age 49) Madrid, Spain
- Listed height: 6 ft 7 in (2.01 m)
- Listed weight: 240 lb (109 kg)

Career information
- High school: Cold Spring Harbor (Cold Spring Harbor, New York)
- College: Miami (Ohio) (1995–1999)
- NBA draft: 1999: 1st round, 6th overall pick
- Drafted by: Minnesota Timberwolves
- Playing career: 1999–2009
- Position: Small forward
- Number: 10, 55, 3

Career history
- 1999–2006: Minnesota Timberwolves
- 2006–2007: Boston Celtics
- 2007–2008: Seattle SuperSonics
- 2008–2009: Cleveland Cavaliers

Career highlights
- NBA All-Star (2002); NBA All-Rookie First Team (2000); Consensus second-team All-American (1999); MAC Player of the Year (1999); 2× First-team All-MAC (1998, 1999); No. 32 retired by Miami RedHawks

Career NBA statistics
- Points: 9,195 (14.1 ppg)
- Rebounds: 2,602 (4.0 rpg)
- Assists: 1,532 (2.4 apg)
- Stats at NBA.com
- Stats at Basketball Reference
Medals
Men's basketball
Representing the United States
FIBA Americas Championship
Gold medal – first place	1999 San Juan	Team
Goodwill Games
Gold medal – first place	1998 New York	Team
Gold medal – first place	2001 Brisbane	Team

Walter Robert Szczerbiak Jr. (/ˈsɜːrbi.æk/ SUR-bee-ak; born March 5, 1977) is an American former professional basketball player and current color analyst for the New York Knicks on MSG Network. He played 10 seasons for four teams in the National Basketball Association. Szczerbiak played college basketball for the Miami RedHawks, and is one of five basketball players whose jerseys have been retired by the university.

== Early life ==
Wally Szczerbiak was born in Madrid, Spain, to Marilyn and Walt Szczerbiak, a former ABA player who helped lead Real Madrid to three FIBA European Champions Cup (now called EuroLeague) championships. During his time with Real Madrid, the elder Szczerbiak set a Spanish League single-game scoring record with 65 points. Wally Szczerbiak spent much of his childhood in Europe during his father's playing career, and he was taught to speak fluent Spanish and Italian.

When Walt Szczerbiak retired, he moved his family back to his native Long Island, New York. Wally Szczerbiak played basketball at Cold Spring Harbor High School in Cold Spring Harbor, New York. As a senior in the 1994–95 season, he averaged 36.6 points per game and 15.9 rebounds per game. He was named the winner of the Richard Sangler Award as Nassau County's outstanding boys' basketball player. Szczerbiak competed for the Long Island team in the 1994 Empire State Games. Despite his outstanding high school statistics, the small size of Szczerbiak's school did not win him the attention of East Coast college coaches, and he went unrecruited.

== College career ==
During the fall of his high school senior year, Szczerbiak and his parents visited the Miami University campus in Oxford, Ohio. The following Monday, despite Walt's wishes for his son to wait before making a decision, Szczerbiak called coach Herb Sendek and committed to play for Miami.

In his first two seasons at Miami, Szczerbiak averaged 8.0 and 12.8 points per game, respectively. As a junior in 1997–98, he burst onto the scene as one of college basketball's leading scorers, averaging 24.4 points per game and earning first-team All-MAC honors despite missing several games with a broken right wrist.

In his senior season, Szczerbiak averaged 24.2 points per game and led the Redhawks to the Sweet 16 in the 1999 NCAA tournament as a #10 seed. Szczerbiak scored a career-high 43 points in a first-round 59–58 win over #7 seed Washington. He followed that performance with 24 points in a second-round toppling of #2 seed Utah, leading the Redhawks to the Sweet 16. Despite Szczerbiak's 23-point performance, the team lost to Kentucky, 58–43. Miami finished the season with a record of 24–8.

Szczerbiak was named MAC Player of the Year, was honored as a first-team All-American by Basketball News and Sports Illustrated, and was selected as a second-team All-American by the Associated Press (AP).

Szczerbiak finished his college career as Miami's second all-time leading scorer with 1,847 points. He earned a degree in marketing. In 2001, Szczerbiak became the fifth Miami player to have his jersey retired (#32). In 2009, he was inducted into the Miami University Athletic Hall of Fame. In 2013, Szczerbiak was inducted into the Ohio Basketball Hall of Fame.

== NBA career ==
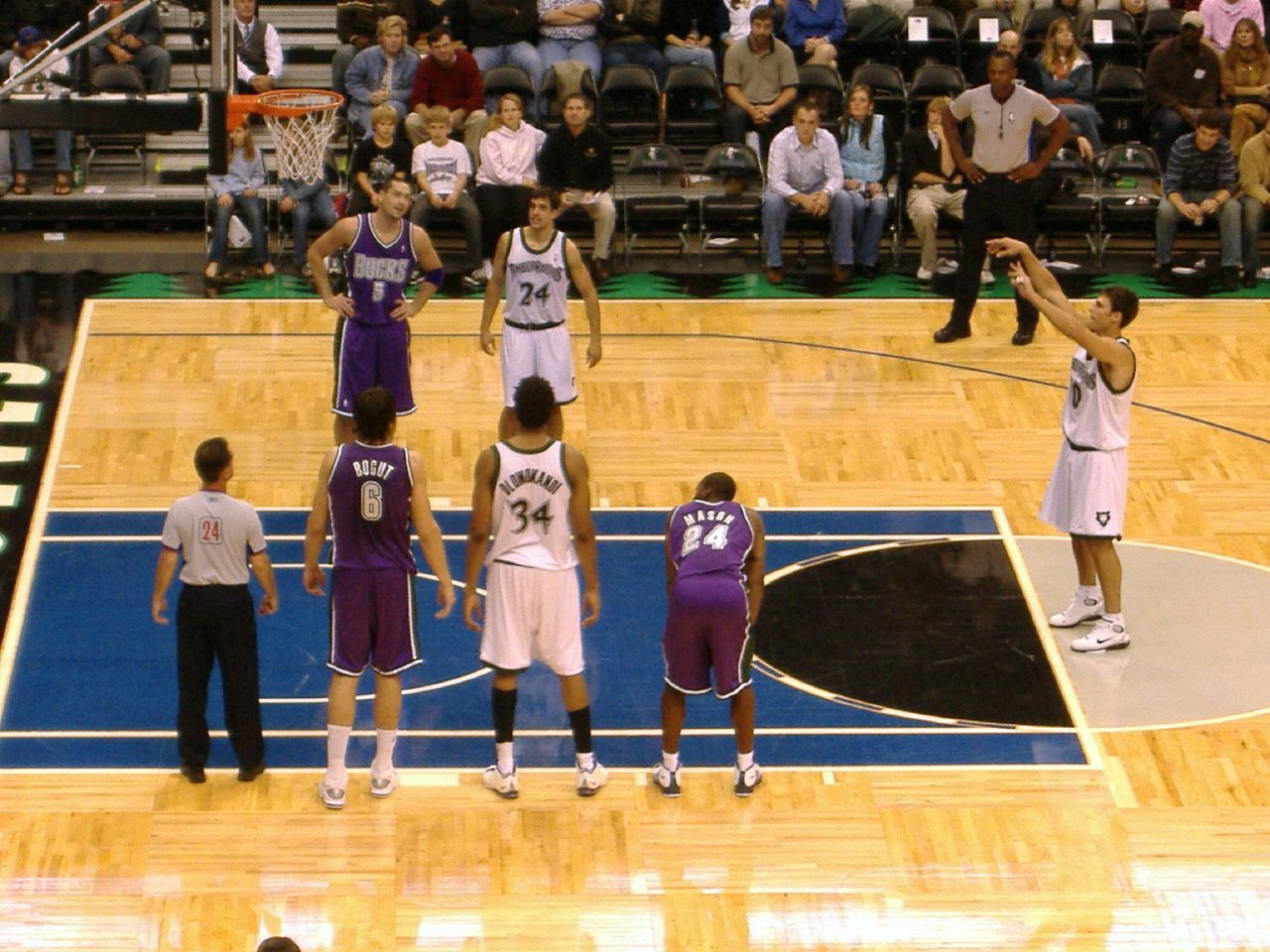
Szczerbiak shoots a free throw.

=== Minnesota Timberwolves (1999–2006) ===
The Minnesota Timberwolves selected Szczerbiak with the sixth overall pick in the 1999 NBA draft. His best year as a professional was in 2002, when he was a coaches' selection to the Western Conference All-Star team. He tied a Timberwolves franchise record of 44 points on April 13, 2003; the record has since been broken. Szczerbiak came off the bench during the 2004–05 NBA season, but returned to a starting role in the 2005–06 season.

=== Boston Celtics (2006–2007) ===
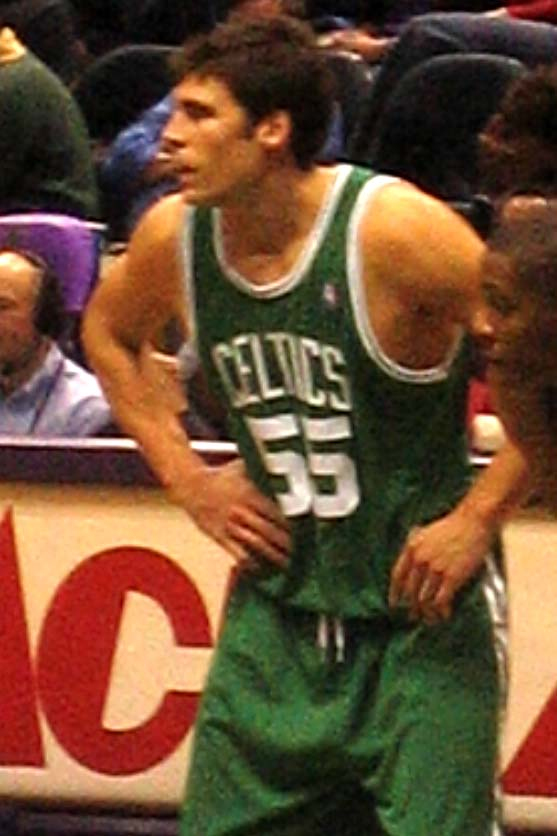
Szczerbiak with the Boston Celtics in January 2006

On January 26, 2006, Szczerbiak, along with Michael Olowokandi, Dwayne Jones and a conditional first-round draft pick, was traded to the Boston Celtics for Ricky Davis, Mark Blount, Marcus Banks, Justin Reed, and two second-round draft picks.

Szczerbiak underwent surgery during the 2006 offseason to repair a knee injury. In the 2006–07 season, Szczerbiak played well early on, including a 35-point performance against the Charlotte Bobcats early in the season. However, he was soon plagued by several injuries to both ankles. The injuries greatly affected his shooting and jumping ability, and he elected to have season-ending surgery.

=== Seattle SuperSonics (2007–2008) ===
On June 28, 2007 ( night of the 2007 NBA draft), the Celtics traded Szczerbiak to the Seattle SuperSonics along with Delonte West and Jeff Green (the 5th overall pick) for Ray Allen and Glen Davis (35th overall).

=== Cleveland Cavaliers (2008–2009) ===
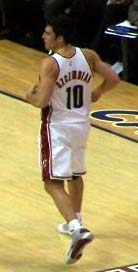
Szczerbiak with the Cleveland Cavaliers in 2009

On February 21, 2008, Szczerbiak and Delonte West were traded by the SuperSonics to the Cleveland Cavaliers in a three-way deal that sent Ira Newble and Donyell Marshall from Cleveland to Seattle, Adrian Griffin from the Chicago Bulls to Seattle, Cedric Simmons, Drew Gooden, Larry Hughes, and Shannon Brown, from Cleveland to Chicago, and Ben Wallace and Joe Smith from Chicago to Cleveland.

Szczerbiak played in 25 regular season games (one start) with the Cavaliers, averaging 8.2 points and 3.2 rebounds per game. He scored 18 points against Detroit on April 16, 2008. Between the SuperSonics and the Cavaliers, Szczerbiak played in 75 games in the 2007-2008 season and averaged 11.5 points and 2.9 rebounds per game.

During the 2008 NBA playoffs, Szczerbiak started at shooting guard for the Cavaliers, helping the Cavs defeat the Washington Wizards in the first round by scoring 26 points and shooting 6–13 from the three-point line in Game Six. For the playoffs, Szczerbiak averaged 10.8 points per game.

During the 2008–2009 NBA season, Szczerbiak played in 74 games, starting in five of them. Given 20 minutes a game, Szczerbiak averaged seven points, 3.2 rebounds, and 1.1 assists per game while shooting .450 from the field and .411 from the three-point line.

=== Retirement ===
Szczerbiak was in discussions with the Denver Nuggets in August 2009 about joining the team on a one-year contract. He reportedly rejected a veteran's minimum contract offer from Denver, opting instead to continue to rehabilitate his knee and possibly test the free agent market later.

Szczerbiak harbored hopes of signing a one-year contract with the New York Knicks. However, on November 5, 2009, Szczerbiak revealed that he had a third surgery performed on his left knee. According to Szczerbiak's doctors, so little cartilage was left in his knee that a fourth surgery would make it difficult for him to have a normal life. Szczerbiak retired from the NBA that year.

During his 10-year NBA career, Szczerbiak averaged 14.1 points per game over 651 games on .485 shooting from the field and .406 shooting from three-point range.

== Broadcasting career ==
Szczerbiak became a basketball analyst for CBS College Sports in 2009.

In 2012, Szczerbiak was hired as an analyst at MSG Network to cover the New York Knicks. As of 2026, he remains in that role.

== Personal life ==
Szczerbiak is of Ukrainian origin: his grandparents were Ukrainians and met in a refugee camp in West Germany after World War II. After the war, they emigrated to Pittsburgh.

Szczerbiak has a younger brother named Will and a younger sister named Wendy. Wendy Szczerbiak played college basketball for Lehigh University.

Szczerbiak married Shannon Ward in 2000. The couple have five children. The couple filed for divorce in 2020.

== NBA career statistics ==
Legend
GP	Games played	GS	Games started	MPG	Minutes per game
FG%	Field goal percentage	3P%	3-point field goal percentage	FT%	Free throw percentage
RPG	Rebounds per game	APG	Assists per game	SPG	Steals per game
BPG	Blocks per game	PPG	Points per game	**Bold**	Career high
*	Led the league

=== Regular season ===
Year	Team	GP	GS	MPG	FG%	3P%	FT%	RPG	APG	SPG	BPG	PPG
1999–00	Minnesota	73	53	29.7	**.511**	.359	.826	3.7	2.8	**.8**	.3	11.6
2000–01	Minnesota	**82**	**82***	34.8	.510	.338	.870	**5.5**	**3.2**	.7	**.4**	14.0
2001–02	Minnesota	**82**	**82**	38.0	.508	**.455**	.831	4.8	3.1	**.8**	.3	18.7
2002–03	Minnesota	52	42	35.3	.481	.421	.867	4.6	2.6	**.8**	**.4**	17.6
2003–04	Minnesota	28	0	22.2	.449	.435	.828	3.1	1.2	.4	.0	10.2
2004–05	Minnesota	81	37	31.6	.506	.373	.855	3.7	2.4	.5	.2	15.5
2005–06	Minnesota	40	40	**38.9**	.495	.406	.896	4.8	2.8	.5	**.4**	**20.1**
2005–06	Boston	32	31	36.7	.476	.393	**.898**	3.8	**3.2**	.6	.1	17.5
2006–07	Boston	32	19	28.1	.415	.415	.897	3.1	1.7	.6	.1	15.0
2007–08	Seattle	50	1	23.6	.460	.428	.843	2.7	1.4	.3	.1	13.1
2007–08	Cleveland	25	1	22.2	.359	.365	.878	3.2	1.4	.4	.3	8.2
2008–09	Cleveland	74	5	20.6	.450	.411	.849	3.1	1.1	.4	.1	7.0
Career		651	393	30.8	.485	.406	.860	4.0	2.4	.6	.2	14.1
All-Star		1	0	12.0	.667	.667	.000	3.0	3.0	1.0	.0	10.0

=== Playoffs ===
Year	Team	GP	GS	MPG	FG%	3P%	FT%	RPG	APG	SPG	BPG	PPG
2000	Minnesota	4	4	23.5	.400	.000	.000	2.0	.5	.8	.3	6.0
2001	Minnesota	4	4	35.8	**.486**	.000	.800	4.5	**2.5**	**1.3**	**.8**	14.0
2002	Minnesota	3	3	**43.7**	.477	.222	.889	**7.0**	2.0	.7	.0	**20.0**
2003	Minnesota	6	6	42.0	.475	.214	.867	5.0	2.2	1.0	.2	14.5
2004	Minnesota	12	0	24.8	.420	**.345**	.927	3.3	1.7	.5	.2	11.8
2008	Cleveland	**13**	**13**	28.8	.376	.323	**.929**	1.8	1.5	.2	.1	10.8
2009	Cleveland	12	0	12.8	.444	.167	.818	2.3	.6	.2	.1	3.6
Career		54	30	26.8	.427	.285	.882	3.1	1.4	.5	.2	10.2

== See also ==
- List of NBA career 3-point field goal percentage leaders
