= Cold Spring Harbor Jr./Sr. High School =

Coordinates: 40°52′02″N 73°27′23″W

Location
- 82 Turkey Lane; Cold Spring Harbor, New York; United States

Information
- Type: Public
- Established: 1962
- School district: Cold Spring Harbor
- Principal: Daniel Danbusky
- Teaching staff: 76.20 (FTE)
- Grades: 7-12
- Enrollment: 735 (2023–2024)
- Student to teacher ratio: 9.65
- Colors: Red, blue and white
- Athletics: Cross country, crew, football, soccer, golf, field hockey, swimming, volleyball, ice hockey, basketball, fencing, gymnastics, track and field, wrestling, baseball, lacrosse, tennis, softball, sailing, cheerleading
- Mascot: Seahawks
- Nickname: Seahawks
- Accreditation: State of New York
- Yearbook: The Harbor Tide
- Website: schools website
- Cold Spring Harbor's mascot

Cold Spring Harbor High School is a public school for grades 7–12 in Cold Spring Harbor, New York, United States. In 2007, it was placed 52nd on Newsweek's Top 1300 High Schools list.

Cold Spring Harbor High School is ranked 33rd among public schools in New York and is the only high school in the Cold Spring Harbor Central School District. There are 989 students attending grades 7–12, and there are 85 teachers working full-time at the school with 65 percent having a master's degree or higher. The student body is 49 percent male and 51 percent female. The minority enrollment is 4 percent, with 2 percent Asian, 1 percent black, and 1 percent Hispanic. White enrollment is 96 percent. AP participation rate among students is 82 percent, and about 68 percent of the students were found to be proficient in math and or reading. The graduation rate at Cold Spring Harbor High School is 95 percent. Average SAT scores are around 1300 and the average ACT score is 29.

== Notable alumni ==
- Harrison Cohen, baseball player
- James Dolan, Cablevision CEO
- Amanda Forsythe, award-winning light lyric soprano
- Alex Foxen, professional poker player
- Jay Jalbert, professional lacrosse player
- Meredith O'Connor, recording artist, entertainer
- Lindsay Lohan, actress, singer, model (did not graduate)
- Kathleen Sullivan, professor and former dean, Stanford Law School
- Wally Szczerbiak, former NBA player
- P.T. Walkley, musician
- Meg Whitman, President and CEO of Hewlett-Packard; former president and CEO of eBay; former candidate for the governorship of California
- Adrienne La Russa, actress
