= Samuel Goodman (rugby union) =

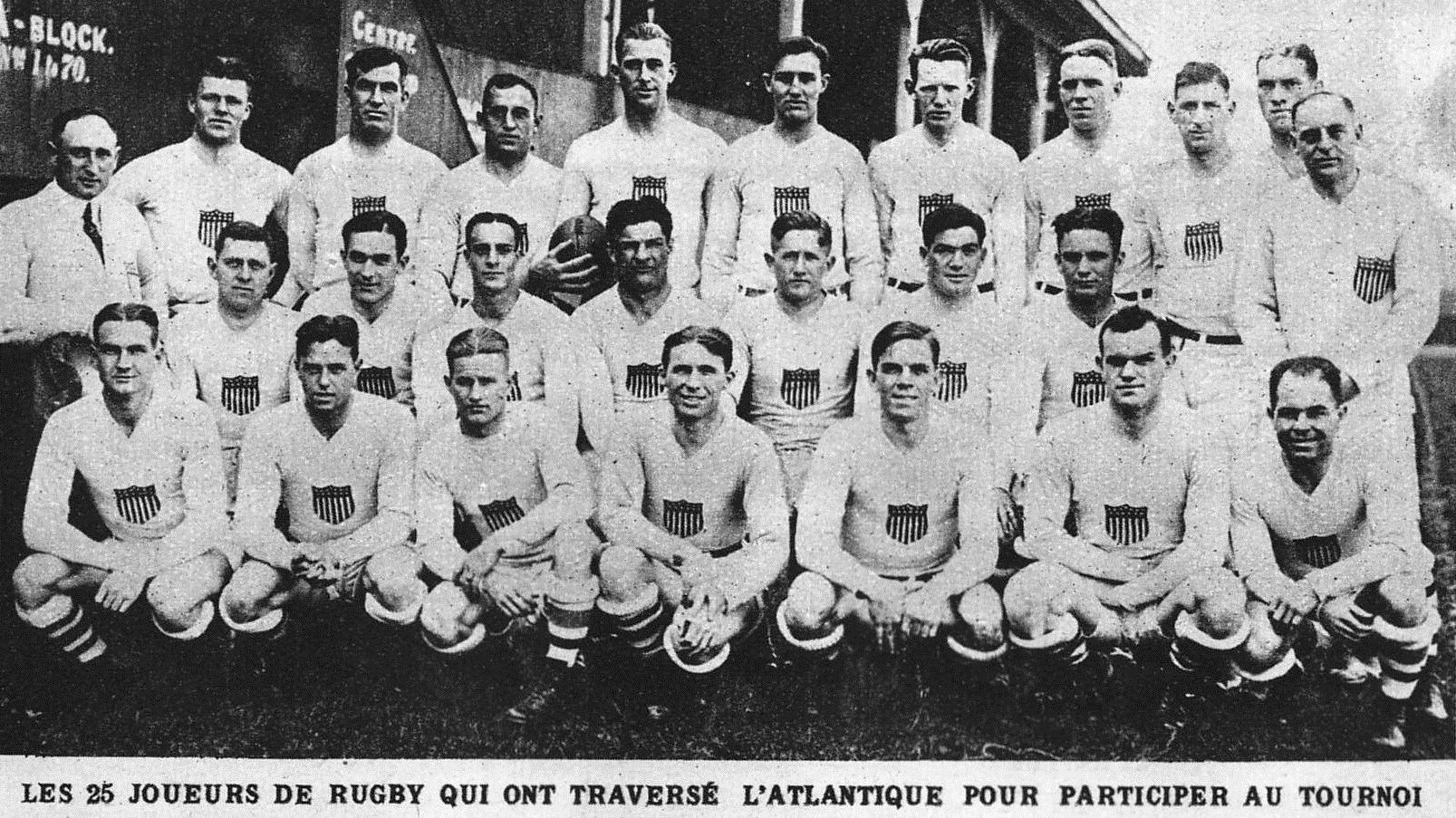
The USA team that won gold in the 1924 Summer Olympics in Paris.

Samuel Goodman was an American rugby union player and manager. In the 1920, and 1924 Summer Olympics, he managed the American Olympic rugby team, which won gold at both events.

== See also ==
- Rugby union at the Olympics
- List of select Jewish rugby union players
