= Harrison Cohen =

American baseball player (born 1999)

New York Yankees – No. 77
- Pitcher
- Born: May 28, 1999 (age 27); New Hyde Park, New York, U.S.
- Bats: Right Throws: Right

Harrison Jared Cohen (born May 28, 1999) is an American professional baseball pitcher for the New York Yankees organization.

== Career ==
Cohen attended Cold Spring Harbor High School in Cold Spring Harbor, New York. He enrolled at George Washington University, where he played college baseball for the George Washington Colonials. Cohen also played collegiate summer baseball for the Cotuit Kettleers of the Cape Cod League.

Undrafted in 2022, Cohen signed as a free agent with the Yankees. The Yankees transitioned Cohen from a starting pitcher to a relief pitcher. In 2023, pitching for the Somerset Patriots, Hudson Valley Renegades, and Tampa Tarpons, he was 3-3 with 2 saves and a 3.61 ERA as in 52.1 innings he struck out 67 batters.

In 2024, ptching for Hudson Valley, Tampa, and the FCL Yankees, he was 5-0 with a 1.35 ERA, as in 26.2 innings he gave up 15 hits while striking out 29 batters, and had an 0,90 WHIP.

In 2025, he was promoted to the Scranton/Wilkes-Barre RailRiders of the Triple-A International League. Between Scranton and the Somerset Patriots he was 3-2 with 5 saves and a 1.76 ERA, as in 49 games (1 start) he pitched 51.0 innings in which he gave up 26 hits while striking out 59 batters.

The Yankees invited Cohen to spring training as a non-roster player in 2026. Cohen played for the Israel national baseball team in the 2026 World Baseball Classic, pitching two perfect innings with five strikeouts.
