= List of Jews in sports (non-players) =

The topic of Jewish participation in sports is discussed extensively in academic and popular literature. Scholars believe that sports have been a historical avenue for Jewish people to overcome obstacles toward their participation in secular society, especially before the mid-20th century in Europe and the United States.

== Commissioners ==
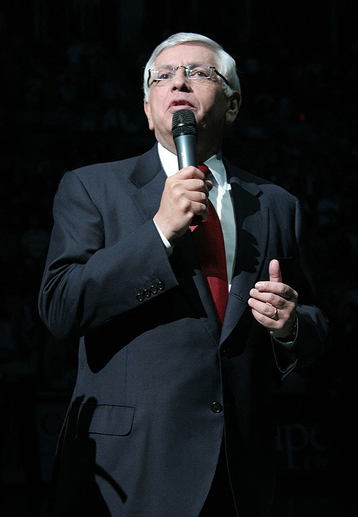
David Stern

- Gary Bettman, US, National Hockey League Commissioner
- Mark Cohon, Canada, Canadian Football League Commissioner
- Al Davis, US, American Football League Commissioner
- Jim Drucker, US, Continental Basketball Association Commissioner; and Arena Football League Commissioner
- Don Garber, US, Major League Soccer Commissioner
- Ludwig Guttmann, Germany, founder of the Paralympics
- Sydney Halter, Canada, first Commissioner of the Canadian Football League
- Cary Kaplan, Canada, President & General Manager, Brampton Beast hockey club; former Commissioner & Chairman of Canadian Soccer League
- Frank Lowy, Czechoslovak-born Australian-Israeli, chair of Football Federation Australia
- Maurice Podoloff, Ukraine-born US, first President of the National Basketball Association
- Jaap van Praag, Dutch, President of Ajax Amsterdam 1964–78, President of the Royal Dutch Football Association
- Alan Rothenberg, US, former President of the United States Soccer Federation; former executive and investor of the North American Soccer League. Currently Vice President of the North American governing body of association football (CONCACAF)
- Bud Selig, US, former Major League Baseball Commissioner, owner of Milwaukee Brewers
- Adam Silver, US, Commissioner of the National Basketball Association
- David Stern, US, former National Basketball Association Commissioner
- Grigory Surkis, Ukraine, Chairman of Football Federation of Ukraine
- Gerardo Werthein, Argentina, is former President of Argentine Olympic Committee and current Honorary President as well as member of International Olympic Committee.
- Brett Yormark, US, Big 12 Conference Commissioner

== Executives ==
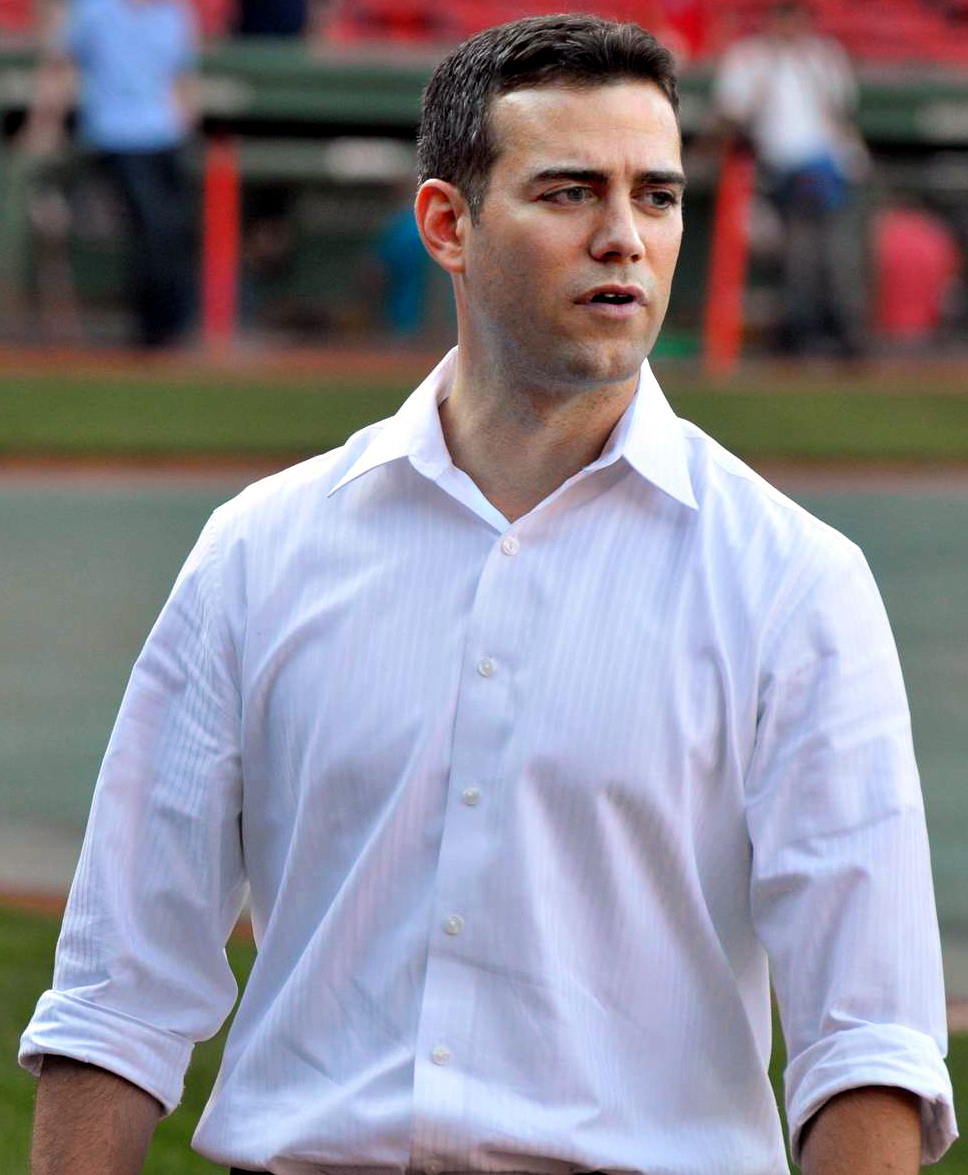
Theo Epstein

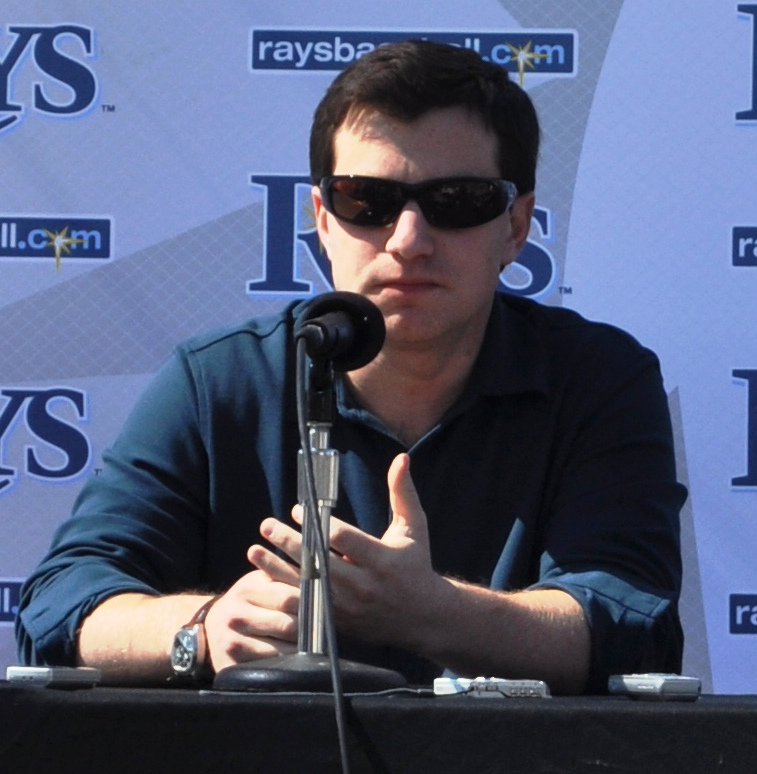
Andrew Friedman

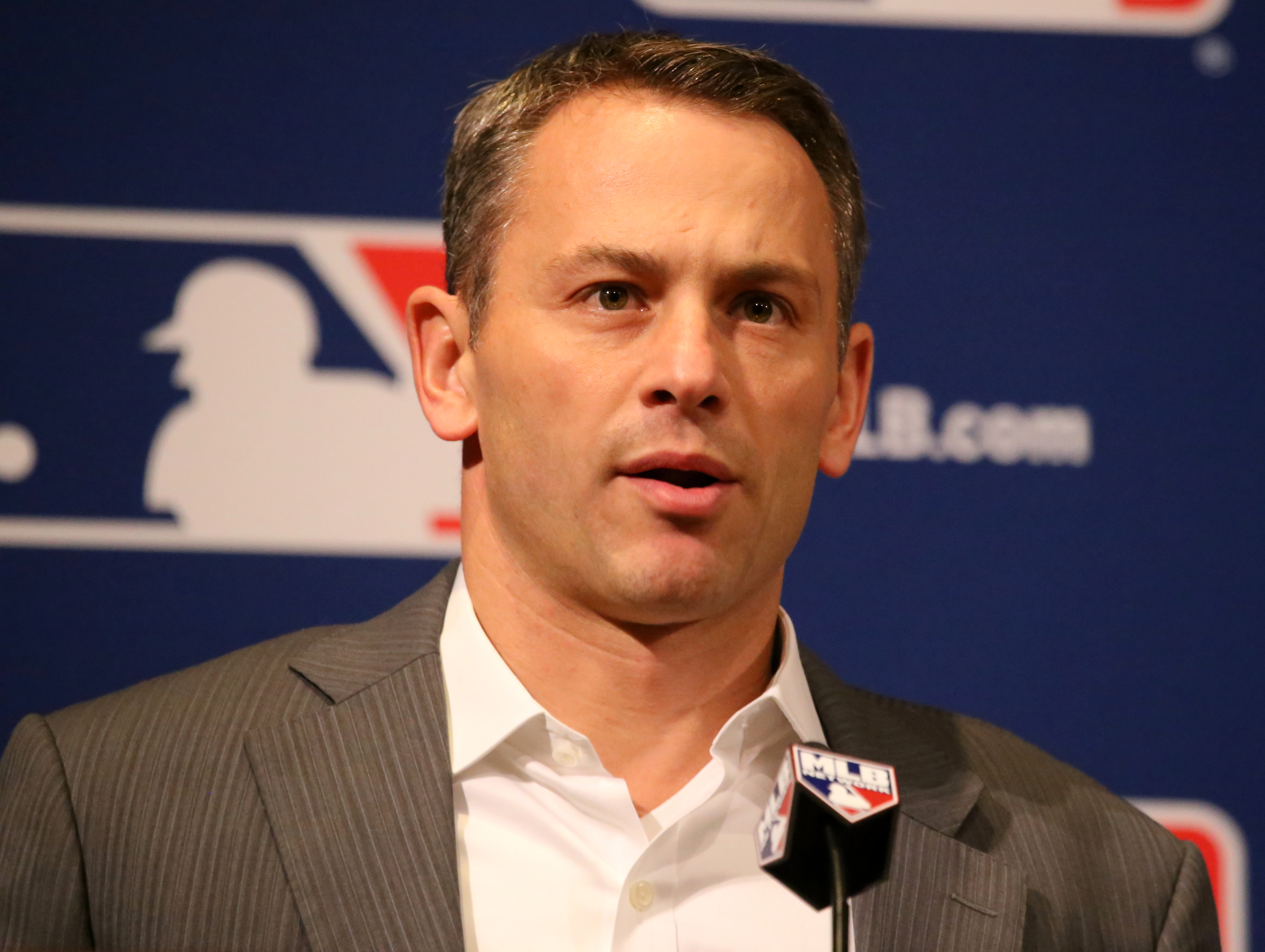
Jed Hoyer

- Chaim Bloom (born 1983), US, Chief Baseball Officer for the St. Louis Cardinals
- Leopoldo Bard, Argentina, co-founder and first president of the Club Atlético River Plate
- Mike Chernoff, General Manager of the Cleveland Indians of Major League Baseball
- Jon Daniels, US, President of Baseball Operations and General Manager of the Major League Baseball team the Texas Rangers
- Theo Epstein, US, former President of Baseball Operations (Chicago Cubs); former General Manager, Boston Red Sox
- Donald Fehr, US, former executive director of the MLB Players Association and of the National Hockey League Players' Association
- Andrew Friedman, US, President of Baseball Operations of the Los Angeles Dodgers (and previously general manager of the Tampa Bay Rays) of Major League Baseball
- Sam Fuld, US, General Manager of the Philadelphia Phillies of Major League Baseball
- Hank Greenberg, US, baseball HOF first baseman of the Detroit Tigers; general manager for the Cleveland Indians and Chicago White Sox, also part-time owner of the Indians.
- Stephen Greenberg, US, deputy commissioner of baseball under Bart Giamatti and chief baseball officer later on.
- Jay Horwitz (born 1945), US, New York Mets executive
- Jed Hoyer, US, baseball Executive VP and General Manager (Chicago Cubs); former General Manager, San Diego Padres
- Cary Kaplan, Canada, President & General Manager, Brampton Beast hockey club; former Commissioner & Chairman of Canadian Soccer League, president Cosmos Sports & Entertainment and former president Hamilton Bulldogs (AHL)
- Jerry Krause, US, former General Manager (Chicago Bulls)
- Marvin Miller, US, executive director of the Major League Baseball Players Association, member of Baseball Hall of Fame
- Matthew Silverman, US, President for Baseball Operations for Major League Baseball's Tampa Bay Rays

== Field managers and coaches ==
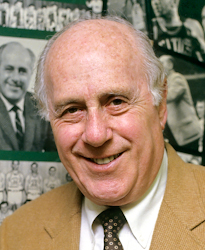
Red Auerbach

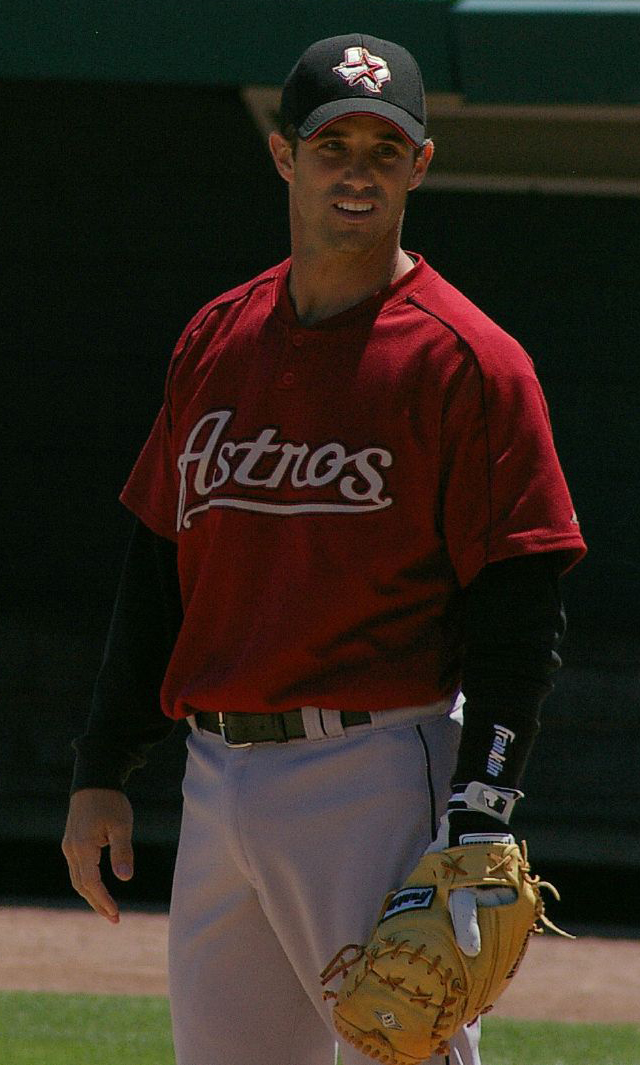
Brad Ausmus

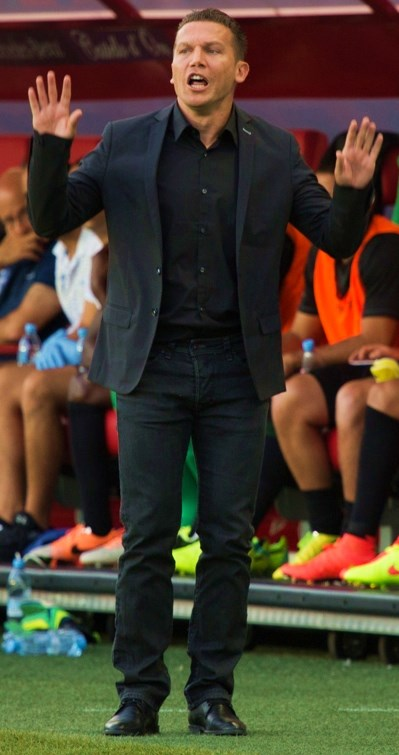
Barak Bakhar

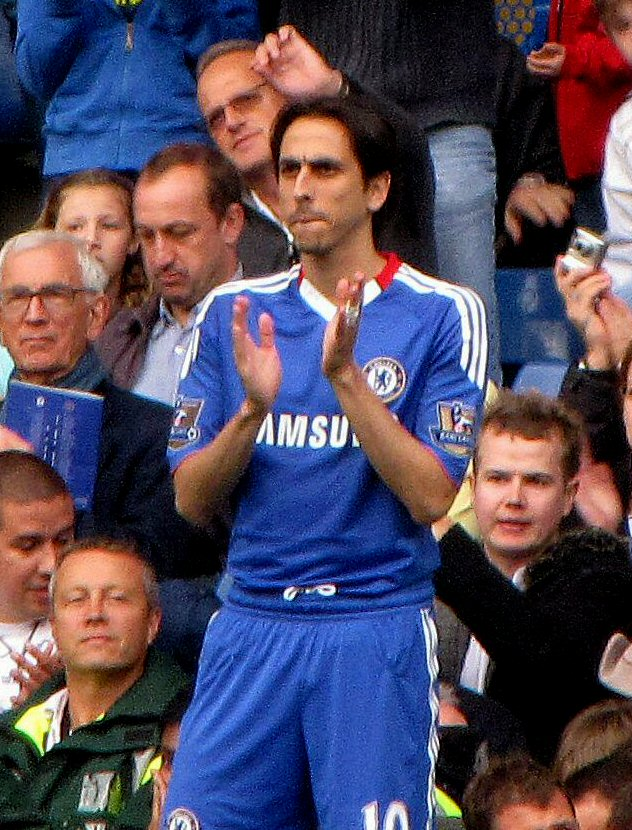
Yossi Benayoun

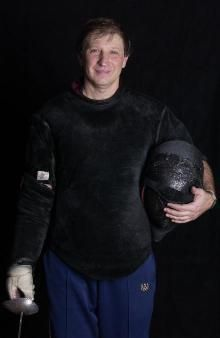
Yury Gelman

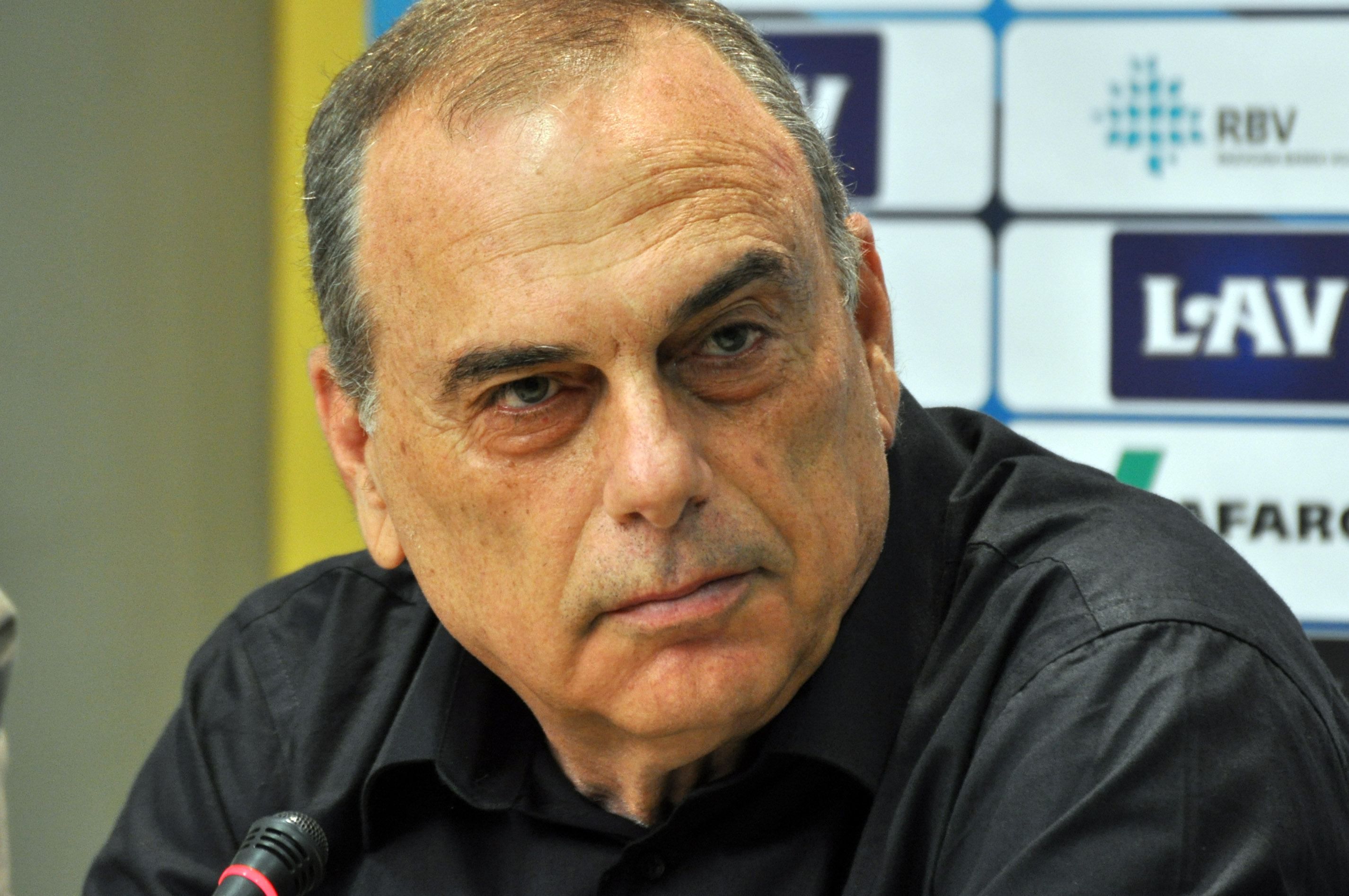
Avram Grant

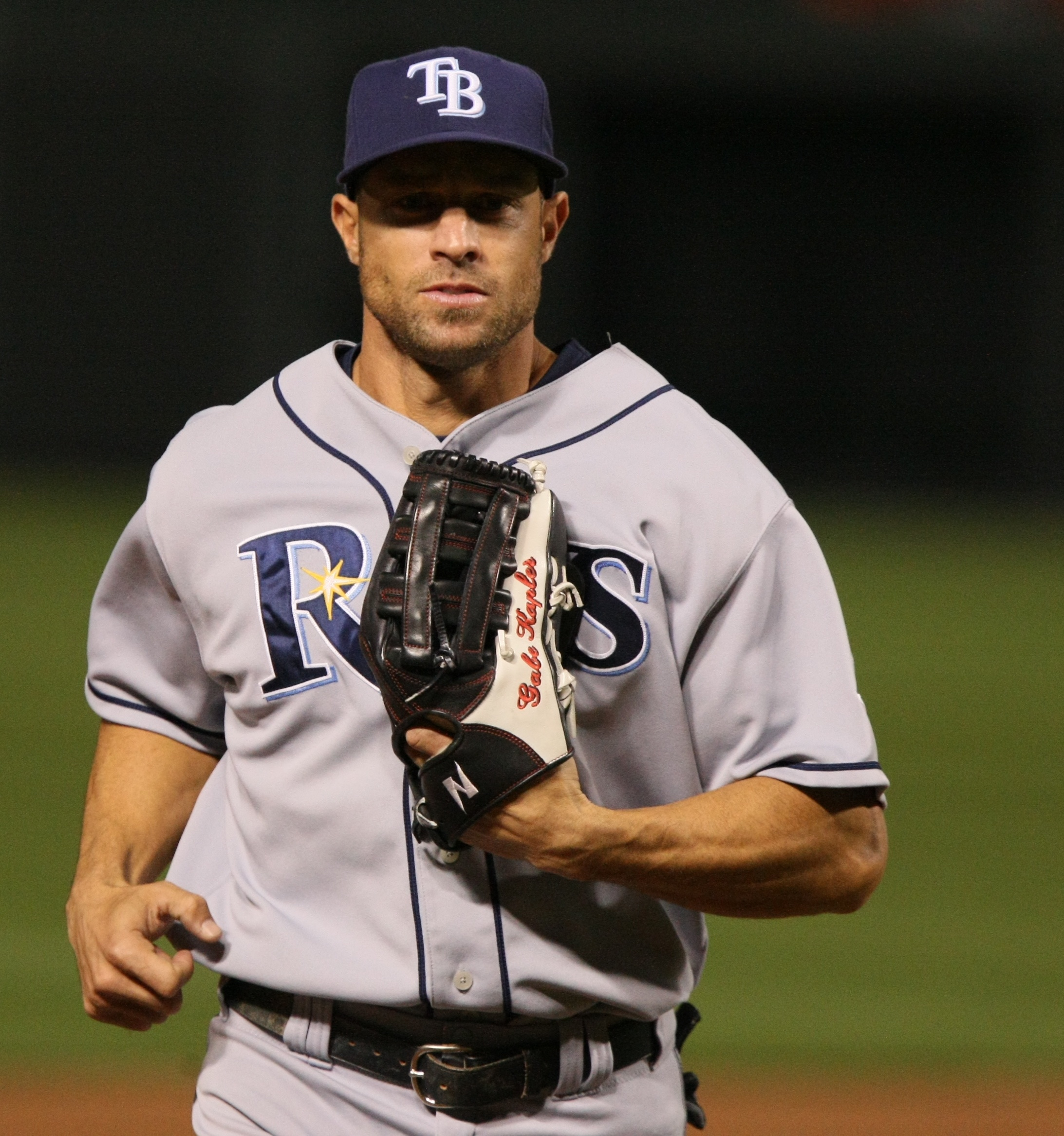
Gabe Kapler

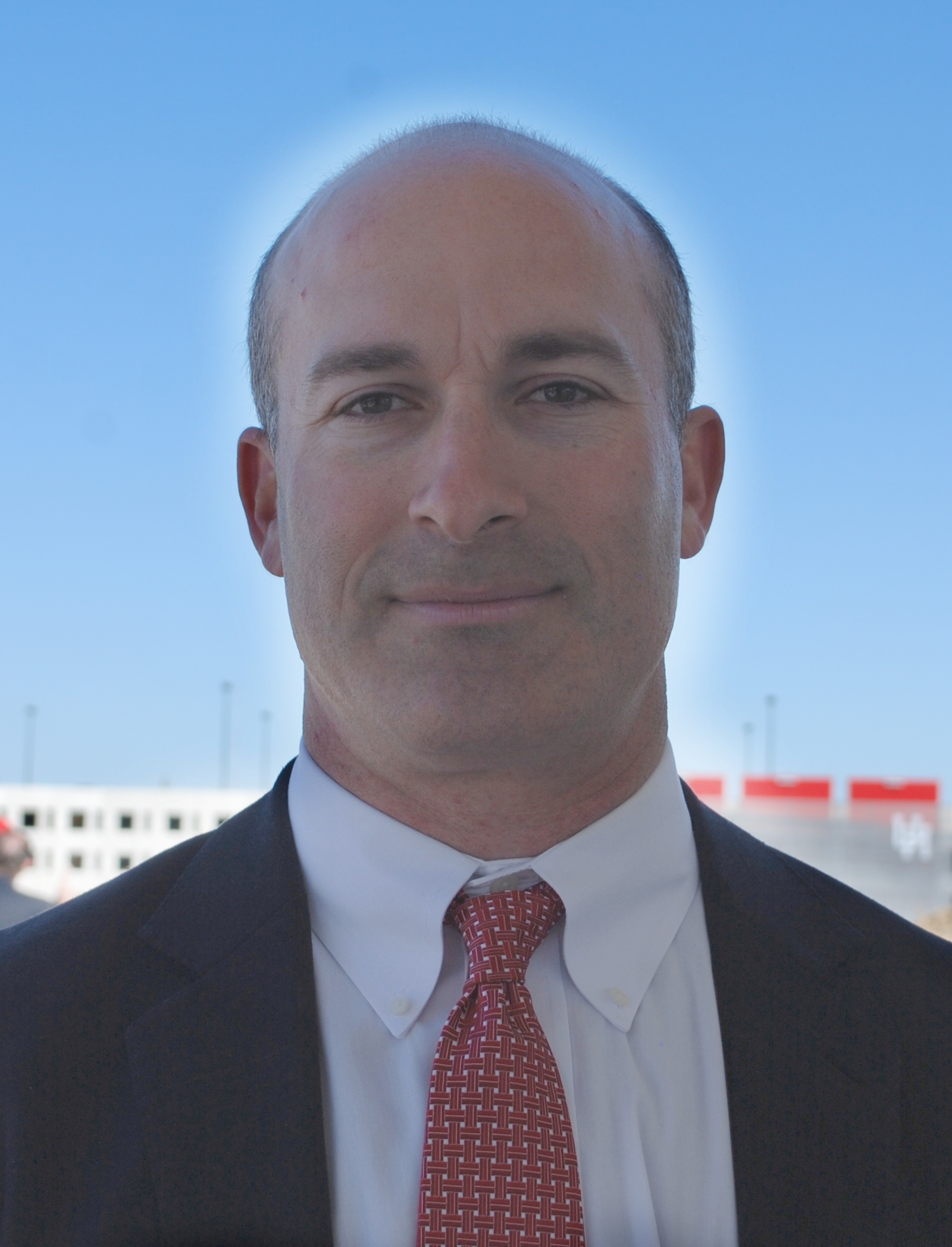
Tony Levine

- Ray Arcel, US, boxing trainer; trained 18 world champions
- Red Auerbach, US, basketball guard, NBA coach (9 championships) & GM, Hall of Fame
- Brad Ausmus, US, baseball catcher, All-Star, 3x Gold Glove, former manager of the Detroit Tigers and Los Angeles Angels, coach for the New York Yankees
- Big Bill Bachrach, US, swimming coach, International Swimming Hall of Fame
- Barak Bakhar, Israel, former player & current manager of the Israeli Premier League association football club Maccabi Haifa since 2020 (during their current 2022–23 UEFA Champions League and its prestigious Group stage)
- Yossi Benayoun, Israel, former player & current professional / technical manager of the Israel national football team since 2022
- Morris "Whitey" Bimstein, US, boxing trainer
- David Blatt, US, college & Israeli professional basketball guard, former NBA coach, Cleveland Cavaliers
- Larry Brown, US, basketball player & pro and college coach, currently at Southern Methodist University
- Andy Cohen, US, Major League second baseman and coach; managed one game for the Philadelphia Phillies in 1960.
- Keith Dambrot, US, men's basketball coach (Duquesne University)
- Al Davis, US, football owner/coach of Oakland Raiders
- Nikolay Epshtein, Soviet ice hockey coach
- Charlotte "Eppie" Epstein, US, coach, International Swimming Hall of Fame
- Jedd Fisch, US, football coach of the University of Washington Huskies
- Lawrence Frank, US, head coach (New Jersey Nets, 2004–10; Detroit Pistons, 2011–13)
- Marty Friedman, US, basketball player & coach
- Eran Ganot, US, men's basketball head coach (University of Hawaii)
- Yury Gelman (born 1955), Ukrainian-born US Olympic fencing coach
- Sid Gillman, US, football player & coach
- Ronen "Nano" Ginzburg, Israel, coach for the Czech Republic national basketball team
- Alexander Gomelsky, Russia, head coach of USSR national team for 30 years, including victory in 1988 Summer Olympics, Naismith Basketball Hall of Fame, FIBA Hall of Fame
- Samuel Goodman, US, manager of gold-winning US Olympic rugby
- Eddie Gottlieb, Ukraine-born US, first basketball coach, manager, and owner of Philadelphia Warriors in the BAA/NBA, NBA founder
- Avram Grant, Israel, football manager, former head coach of English Premier League clubs Chelsea F.C. and Portsmouth F.C. and of the Israel national football team
- Ofir Haim, Israel, soccer manager, head coach of the Israel national under-19 football team during their successful 2022 UEFA Euro Under-19 campaign (2nd place in the finals)
- Brad Greenberg, US, former men's basketball coach (Radford University)
- Seth Greenberg, US, former men's basketball coach (Virginia Tech, South Florida, Long Beach State)
- Béla Guttmann, Hungary, football manager, AC Milan, São Paulo F.C., F.C. Porto, Benfica, C.A. Penarol
- Cecil Hart, Canada, hockey coach/manager (Montreal Canadiens); original Hart Trophy named after father David, & current one after him
- Alon Hazan, Israel, former player & current head coach of the senior Israel national football team since 8 May 2022 (during their successful 2022–23 UEFA Nations League B campaign, where they were placed 1st, and thus has qualified to the upcoming 2024–25 UEFA Nations League A)
- Paul Heyman, US, professional wrestling manager
- Melissa Hiatt, US, professional wrestling manager
- Nat Holman, US, basketball player & coach, Hall of Fame
- Roy Hodgson, England, soccer manager, former England national football team manager, currently manager of Crystal Palace
- Red Holzman, US, basketball player & coach, Hall of Fame
- Yoel Judah, US, boxer & trainer
- Gabe Kapler, US, baseball outfielder, manager (Philadelphia Phillies and San Francisco Giants), 2021 NL Manager of the Year
- Béla Komjádi, Hungary, coach, International Swimming Hall of Fame
- Randy Levine, US, President of New York Yankees baseball team
- Tony Levine, US, football coach of the University of Houston Cougars
- Lenny Levy, US, baseball coach (Pittsburgh Pirates)
- Marv Levy, US, football coach & General Manager (Montreal Alouettes, Buffalo Bills)
- Bob Melvin, US, baseball player and manager (Oakland A's), 3x Manager of the Year
- Cecil Moss, South Africa, coach of Springboks rugby team.
- León Najnudel, Argentina, coach of Argentina national basketball team, and the main driving force in the creation of the Liga Nacional de Básquet (National Basketball League).
- Joe Pasternack, US, men's basketball head coach (UC Santa Barbara)
- Josh Pastner, US, men's basketball head coach (UNLV Runnin' Rebels, Georgia Tech Yellow Jackets)
- Gabe Paul, US, baseball President & General Manager of Cleveland Indians and New York Yankees
- Bruce Pearl, US, men's basketball coach, Auburn University
- José Pekerman, Argentina, Argentine football manager He was a coach in the Argentina national football team, Colombia national football team, and Venezuela national football team. In his stage as coach of the Argentina national under-20 football team, won three FIFA U-20 World Cup.
- Lefty Phillips, US; briefly a minor league pitcher in the 1930s, later became a pitching coach and manager.
- Jake Pitler, US, second baseman and coach
- David Pleat, England, football manager, Tottenham Hotspur, Luton Town
- Bela Rajki-Reich, Hungary, swimming and water polo coach
- Jimmie Reese, US, baseball second baseman, coach
- Ernie Roth, US, professional wrestling manager
- Larry Rothschild, US, baseball pitcher, coach, and manager (currently New York Yankees pitching coach)
- Yehoshua Rozin, Israeli basketball coach
- Dolph Schayes, US, basketball player & coach
- Mark Shapiro, US, General Manager of Cleveland Indians
- Allie Sherman, US, football player & coach, New York Giants
- Norm Sherry, US, baseball catcher, manager, and coach
- Leonid Slutsky, Russia, National football team manager (2015–16) brought the Russian team to Euro-2016 in France, currently manages Hull City in English Championship League
- Marc Trestman, US, NFL head coach (Chicago Bears, 2013–14), current head coach of the Toronto Argonauts of the Canadian Football League
- Irina Viner-Usmanova, Russia, coach of multiple world and Olympic champions in rhythmic gymnastics, President of Russian Rhythmic Gymnastics Federation
- Ryan Warsofsky, US, NHL ice hockey head coach
- Dan Warthen, US, baseball pitcher and pitching coach (currently, for the Texas Rangers)

== Officials ==
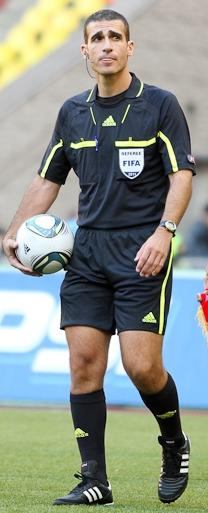
Alon Yefet

- Menachem Ashkenazi, Bulgaria/Israel, association football, Olympic and World Cup referee
- Al Clark, US, former MLB umpire
- Norm Drucker, US, former NBA referee and Supervisor of Officials
- Al Forman, US, MLB umpire
- Leo Goldstein, US, association football, World Cup assistant referee
- Jonathan Kaplan, South Africa, rugby union, world record for refereeing highest number of international rugby union test matches, most experienced Test referee of all time
- Wolf Karni, Finland, association football, Olympic referee
- Abraham Klein, Romania/Israel, association football, World Cup referee
- Jerry Markbreit, US, former NFL referee
- Davey Pearl US Former Boxing Referee
- Mendy Rudolph, NBA and ABA referee, Naismith Basketball Hall of Fame
- Dolly Stark, first Jewish MLB umpire in modern (post-1900) baseball.
- Alon Yefet, Israel, association football, FIFA international referee

== Owners ==
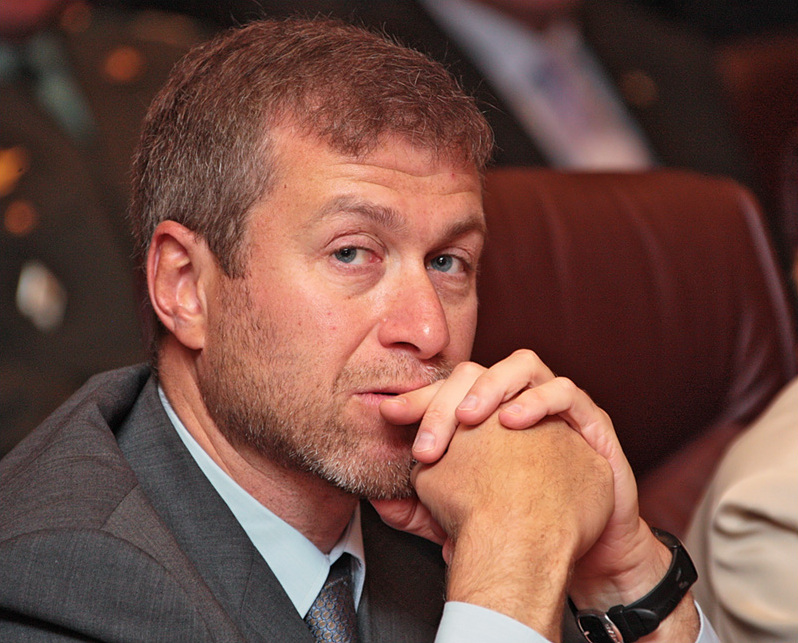
Roman Abramovich

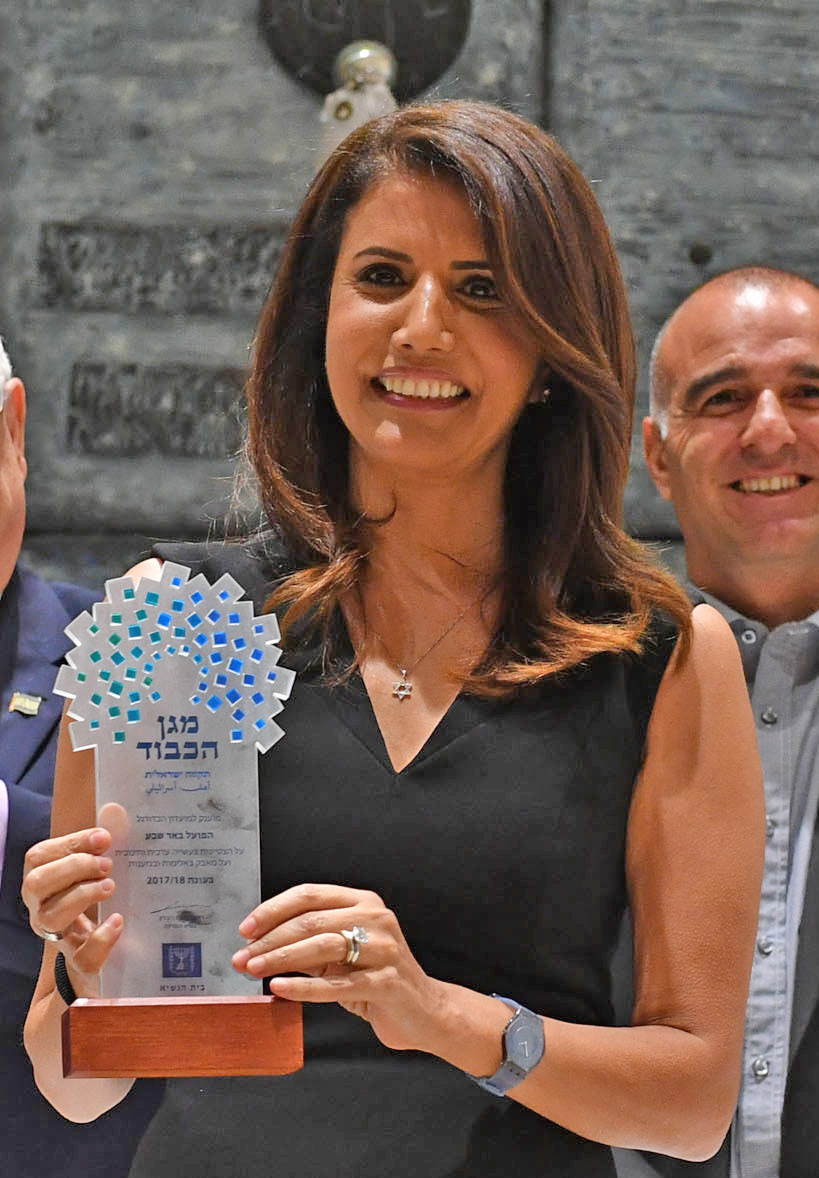
Alona Barkat

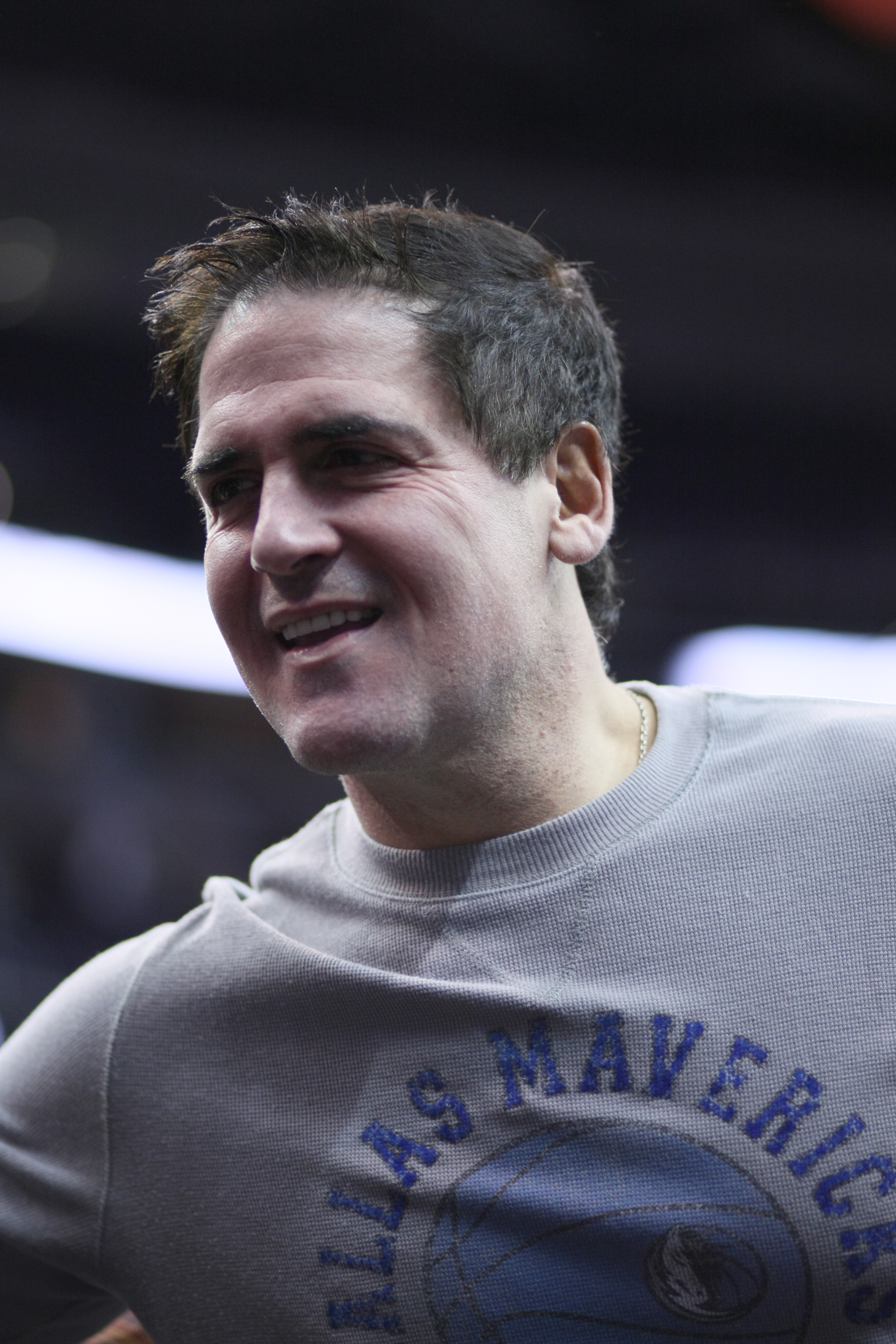
Mark Cuban

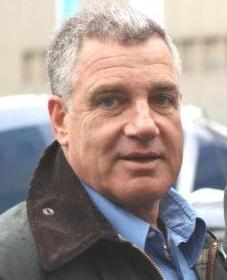
Idan Ofer

- Roman Abramovich, Russia/Israel, former owner of English Premier League association football club Chelsea Football Club
- Miriam Adelson, owner, Dallas Mavericks
- Leslie Alexander, US, former owner of Houston Rockets; former owner of Houston Comets
- Micky Arison, Israel/US, owner of Miami Heat
- Larry Baer, US, CEO of the San Francisco Giants
- Steve Ballmer, US, owner of the Los Angeles Clippers
- Alona Barkat, Israel, owner of Israeli Premier League association football club Hapoel Be'er Sheva
- Steve Belkin, US, former co-owner of the Atlanta Thrashers and Atlanta Hawks
- Arthur Blank, US, owner, Atlanta Falcons, Atlanta United FC, and Georgia Force
- David Blitzer, owner, Philadelphia 76ers, New Jersey Devils, G.D. Estoril Praia, AD Alcorcón, S.K. Beveren, ADO Den Haag, Real Salt Lake, Brøndby IF
- Tony Bloom, England, owner of Brighton & Hove Albion F.C.
- Francis Borelli, France, former President of Paris Saint-Germain Football Club, AS Cannes
- Norman Braman, US, former owner of Philadelphia Eagles
- Alan Cohen, US, owner of Florida Panthers hockey team
- Alan N. Cohen, US, former owner of New York Knicks and New York Rangers, co-owner of Boston Celtics and New Jersey Nets, and Chairman & CEO of Madison Square Garden Corporation
- Steve Cohen, US, owner of the New York Mets
- Uri Coronel, Dutch, former Chairman of Ajax Amsterdam
- Mark Cuban, US, owner of Dallas Mavericks
- William Davidson, US, Chairman of Palace Sports and Entertainment, principal owner of Detroit Pistons, Detroit Shock of the WNBA, and Tampa Bay Lightning of the NHL
- Al Davis, US, former owner, Oakland Raiders
- Mark Davis, owner, Las Vegas Raiders, Las Vegas Aces
- Barney Dreyfuss, US, owner of Pittsburgh Pirates, Baseball Hall of Fame
- Mark Ein, owner, DC Open, Washington Kastles, Washington Justice
- John J. Fisher, US, owner of the Oakland Athletics baseball team
- Andrew Freedman, US, former owner of New York Giants baseball team
- Emil Fuchs, German-born US, owner of Boston Braves baseball team
- Arcadi Gaydamak, Russia, owner of Beitar Jerusalem F.C.
- Alexandre Gaydamak, France & Russia, co-owner & Chairman of Portsmouth F.C.
- Dan Gilbert, US, owner of Cleveland Cavaliers
- Gary Gilbert, US, part owner of Cleveland Cavaliers, brother of Dan Gilbert
- Avram Glazer, US, joint chairman of Manchester United board, owner of the Tampa Bay Buccaneers of the (NFL)
- Joel Glazer, US, joint chairman of Manchester United
- Malcolm Glazer, US, owner of Tampa Bay Buccaneers, majority owner of Manchester United
- Paul Godfrey, Canada, owner of the Toronto Blue Jays
- Chuck Greenberg, US, co-owner of Texas Rangers
- Ernie Grunfeld, US, basketball player & GM of Washington Wizards
- Peter Guber, US, co-owner of Golden State Warriors of the National Basketball Association (NBA), Los Angeles Dodgers of Major League Baseball, and Los Angeles FC of Major League Soccer
- Walter A. Haas Jr., US, owner of Oakland Athletics
- Josh Harris, US, owner of the Philadelphia 76ers, New Jersey Devils, Washington Commanders
- Ben Hatskin, Canada, founder and owner of the Winnipeg Jets
- Leon Hess, US, owner of New York Jets
- Jerold Hoffberger, US, owner of Baltimore Orioles baseball team
- Mat Ishbia, US, majority owner of Phoenix Suns
- Stan Kasten, US, former President of the Atlanta Braves and Washington Nationals and current president, and part-owner, of the Los Angeles Dodgers in baseball.
- Daryl Katz, Canada, owner of Edmonton Oilers
- Eugene Klein, US, owner of San Diego Chargers and part owner of Seattle SuperSonics
- Alexander Knaster, USSR/UK, owner of Italian football club A.C. Pisa 1909
- Louis "Red" Klotz, US, NBA 5' 7" point guard, formed teams that play against and tour with the Harlem Globetrotters
- Herb Kohl, US, owner of Milwaukee Bucks (1985–2014)
- Robert Kraft, US, owner of New England Patriots & New England Revolution
- Joe Lacob, US, owner of Golden State Warriors
- Kurt Landauer, Germany, President of Bayern Munich
- Marc Lasry, Morocco, co-owner of the basketball's Milwaukee Bucks
- Al Lerner, US, owner of Cleveland Browns
- Randy Lerner, US, owner of Cleveland Browns & Aston Villa
- Ted Lerner and family, US, owners of Washington Nationals
- Daniel Levy, England, Chairman of Tottenham Hotspur
- Joe Lewis, England, owner Tottenham Hotspur F.C.
- Jeffrey Loria, US, former owner of Miami Marlins
- Bob Lurie, US, owner of San Francisco Giants
- Jeffrey Lurie, US, owner of Philadelphia Eagles
- Scott D. Malkin, US, co-owner of New York Islanders hockey team and
- Jamie McCourt, US, President of Los Angeles Dodgers
- Art Modell, US, former owner of Baltimore Ravens
- Idan Ofer, Israel, co-owner of Spain's La Liga association football club Atlético Madrid, as well co-owner of Portugal's Primeira Liga association football club FC Famalicão.
- Abe Pollin, US, owner of Washington Wizards, former owner of NHL's Washington Capitals & WNBA's Washington Mystics
- Jaap van Praag, Dutch, President of Ajax Amsterdam 1964–78, President of Royal Dutch Football Association
- Michael van Praag, Dutch, President of Ajax Amsterdam, 1989–2002
- Mikhail Prokhorov, former owner, Brooklyn Nets
- Bruce Ratner, US, minority owner of Brooklyn Nets
- Jerry Reinsdorf, US, owner of Chicago Bulls & Chicago White Sox
- Carroll Rosenbloom, US, former owner of Baltimore Colts & Los Angeles Rams
- Chip Rosenbloom, US, owner of Los Angeles Rams
- Stephen M. Ross, US, owner of Miami Dolphins
- Henry Samueli, US, owner of Anaheim Ducks, founder of Broadcom Corporation
- Abe Saperstein, UK-born US, founder & owner of Harlem Globetrotters
- Irving Scholar, England, chairman Tottenham Hotspur F. C.
- Howard Schultz, US, owner of Seattle SuperSonics and Seattle Storm; founder of Starbucks
- Bud Selig, US, former Major League Baseball Commissioner, owner of Milwaukee Brewers
- Herbert Simon, US, owner of the Indiana Pacers basketball team
- Ed Snider, US, owner of Philadelphia Flyers and part-owner of Philadelphia Eagles
- Daniel Snyder, US, former owner of Washington Redskins
- Donald Sterling, US, former owner of the Los Angeles Clippers
- Stuart Sternberg, US, owner of Tampa Bay Rays
- Alan Sugar, England, Chairman of Tottenham Hotspur
- Larry Tanenbaum, Canada, owner of Toronto Maple Leafs & Toronto Raptors
- Preston Robert Tisch, US, from 1991 until his death in 2005 Tisch owned 50% of New York Giants American football team
- Steve Tisch, US, part-owner of the New York Giants, son of Preston Tisch
- Leonard Tose, US, owner of Philadelphia Eagles
- Cliff Viner, US, co-owner of Florida Panthers
- Jeffrey Vinik, US, owner of Tampa Bay Lightning (NHL) and minority owner of Boston Red Sox (MLB)
- Larry Weinberg, former owner, Portland Trail Blazers
- Sonny Werblin, former owner, New York Jets
- Zygi Wilf, German-born US, principal owner of Minnesota Vikings
- Fred Wilpon, US, minority owner of New York Mets
- Jeff Wilpon, US, minority owner and COO of New York Mets
- Max Winter, US, owner of Minneapolis Lakers and former owner of Minnesota Vikings
- Lewis Wolff, US, owner of Oakland Athletics

== Promoters ==
- Bob Arum, US, boxing promoter
- Senda Berenson, Russian-born US, basketball pioneer
- Mickey Duff, British boxing promoter
- Joel Gertner, US, professional wrestling promoter
- Paul Heyman, US, professional wrestling manager & promoter
- Mike Jacobs, US, boxing promoter
- Sam Muchnick, US, wrestling promoter
- J Russell Peltz, US, boxing promoter

== Sportscasters ==
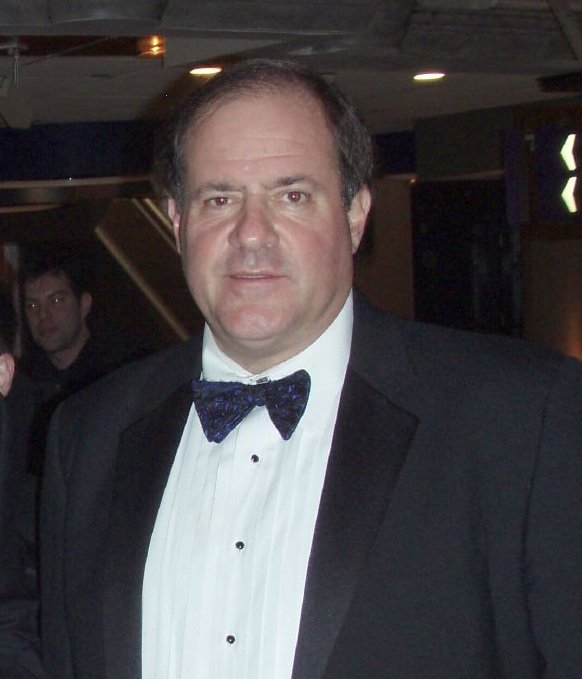
Chris Berman

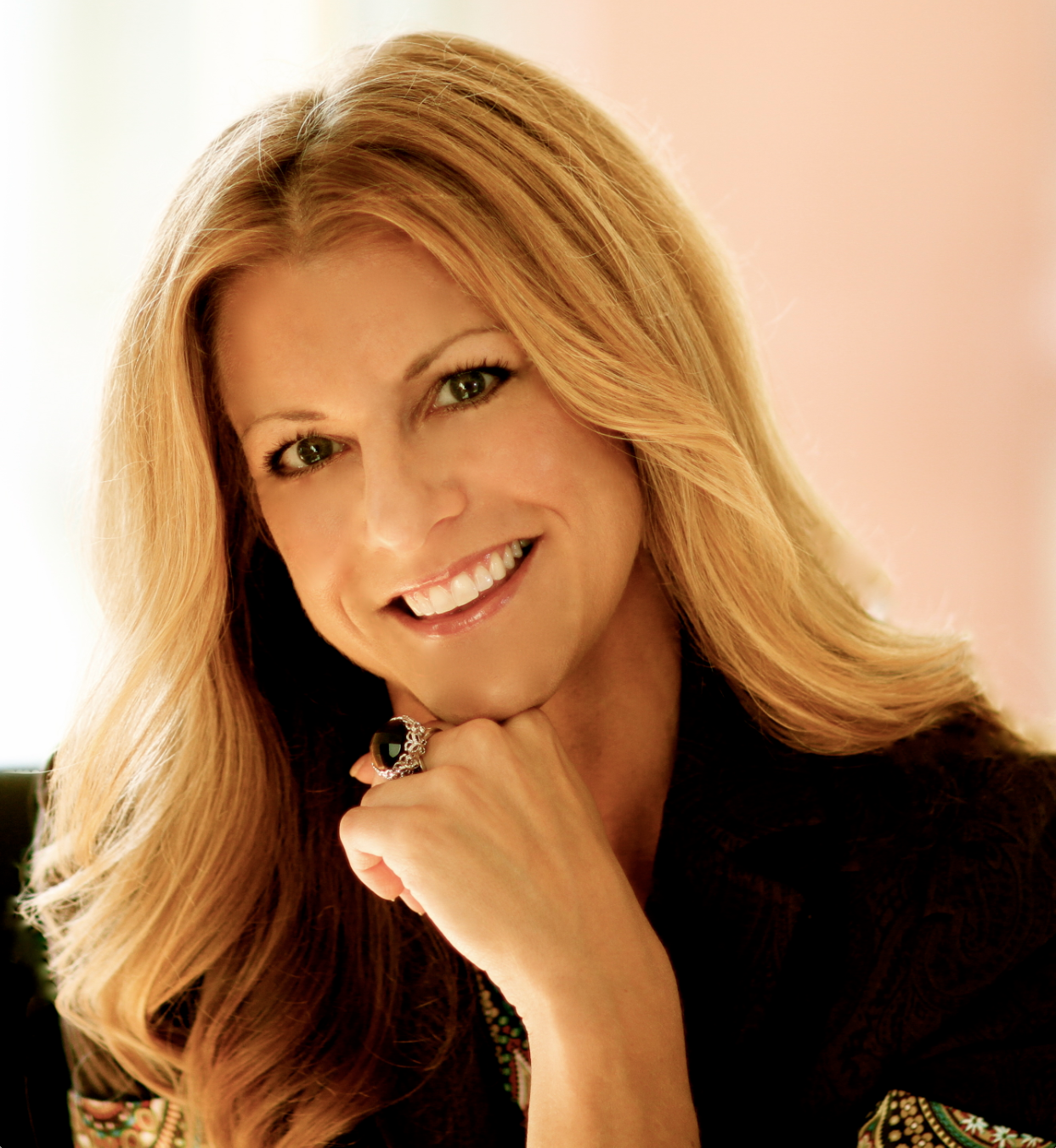
Bonnie Bernstein

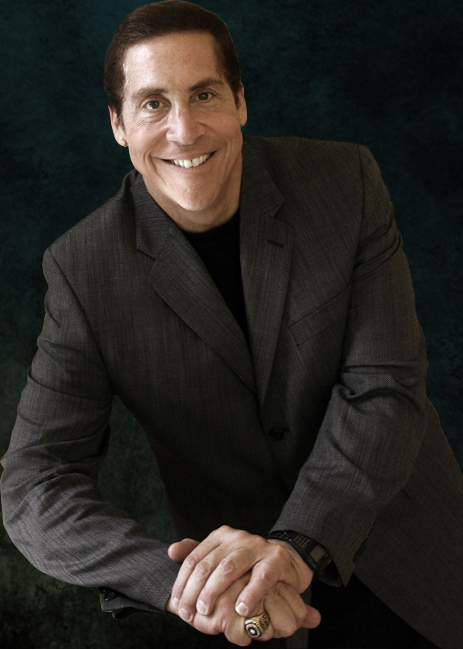
Roy Firestone

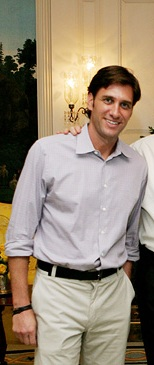
Mike Greenberg

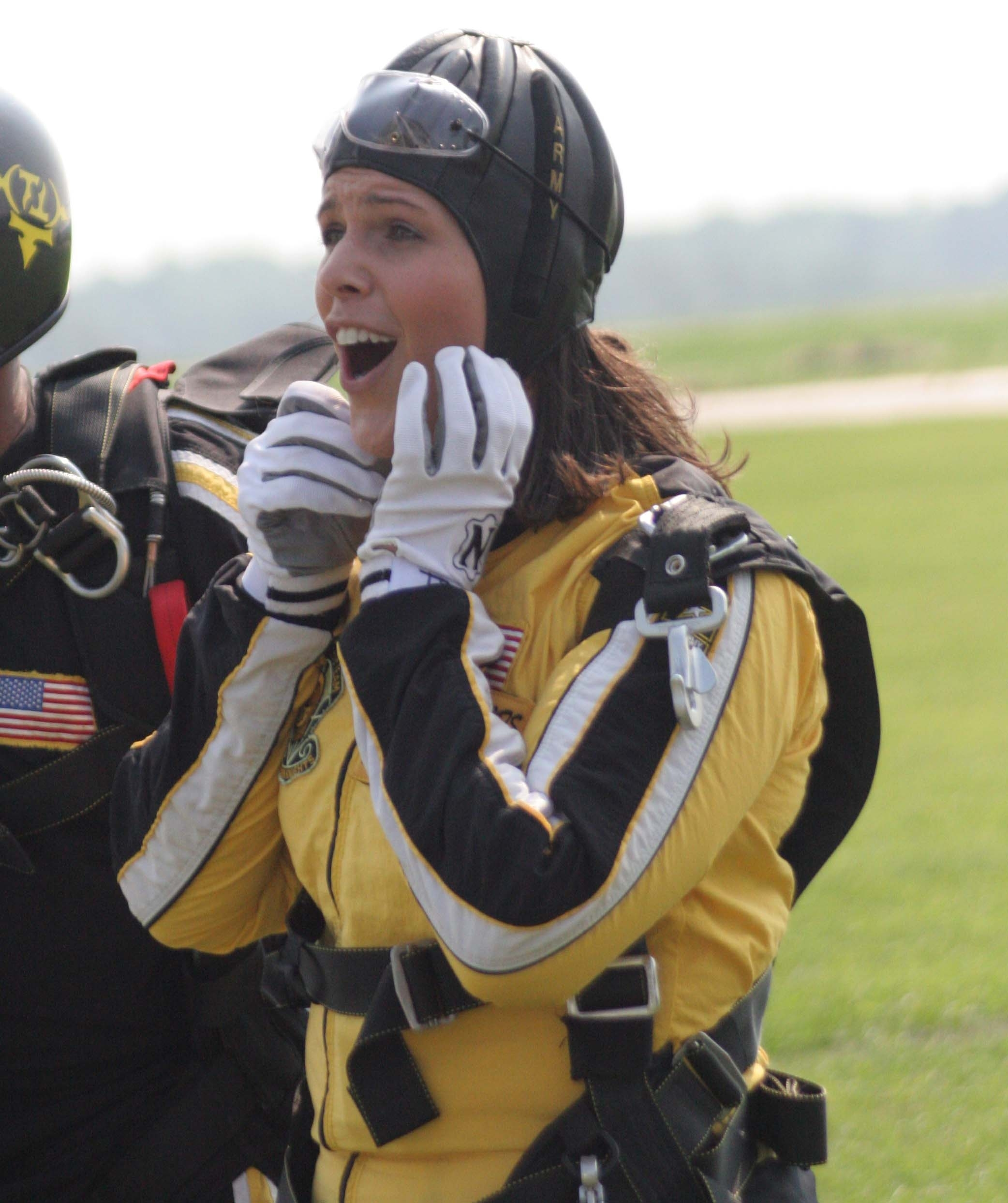
Dana Jacobson

- Kenny Albert, US, sportscaster
- Marv Albert, US, sportscaster
- Mel Allen, US, sportscaster, New York Yankees play-by-play announcer
- Chris Berman, US, ESPN talk show host
- Len Berman, US, sportscaster
- Bonnie Bernstein, US, CBS & ESPN sportscaster
- Steve Bornstein, US, President & CEO of NFL Network
- Steve Buckhantz, US, Washington Wizards play-by-play announcer
- Steve Bunin, US, ESPN sportscaster
- Craig Carton, US, WFAN morning show
- Gary Cohen, US, New York Mets telecaster
- Linda Cohn, US, ESPN anchor
- Myron Cope, US, Pittsburgh Steelers radio announcer
- Howard Cosell, US, sportscaster
- Seth Davis, US, ESPN sportscaster
- Ian Eagle, US, sportscaster
- Rich Eisen, US, ESPN, NFL network anchor
- Josh Elliott, US, television journalist
- Howard Finkel, US, WWE Hall of Fame announcer.
- Roy Firestone, US, sportscaster
- Elliotte Friedman, Canada, CBC Sports broadcaster
- Jack van Gelder, Dutch sports commentator
- Hank Goldberg, US, football analyst
- Mauricio Goldfarb, better known as Mauro Viale, Argentina, sportscaster.
- Marty Glickman, US, sprinter & broadcaster; US Olympic team, All American (football)
- Doug Gottlieb, US, ESPN NCAA basketball analyst
- Mike Greenberg, US, ESPN anchor
- Billy Jaffe, US, New York Islanders sportscaster
- Max Kellerman, boxing broadcaster
- Suzy Kolber, US, ESPN sportswriter
- Tony Kornheiser, US, radio show host, tv show host, author
- Andrea Kremer, US, sportscaster/ NBC sideline reporter
- Justin Kutcher, US, sportscaster
- Michael Landsberg, Canada, TSN anchor
- Ken Levine, Major League Baseball announcer
- Steve Levy, US, ESPN anchor
- Mitch Melnick, Canada, Montreal Expos English radio colour analyst
- Al Michaels, US, sportscaster
- Johnny Most, US, Boston Celtics sportscaster
- Elliott Price, Canada, Montreal Expos radio play-by-play
- Karl Ravech, US, ESPN journalist
- Jim Rome, US, radio, TV host
- Howie Rose, US, New York Islanders, New York Mets sportscaster
- Sam Rosen, US, New York Rangers on TV, NHL on OLN, NFL on Fox sportscaster
- Dick Schaap, US, sportswriter & broadcaster
- Jeremy Schaap, US, sports commentator & broadcaster (son of Dick Schaap)
- Adam Schefter, US, sportswriter and tv analyst
- Dan Shulman, Canada, sportscaster ESPN: Sunday Baseball, College Basketball coverage
- Ted Sobel, US, Los Angeles based sportscaster/reporter. KFWB, KNX, KMPC radio, Sports USA. Member of Southern California Jewish Sports Hall of Fame.
- Charley Steiner, US, Los Angeles Dodgers radio-TV play-by-play announcer
- Dick Stockton, US, retired sportscaster (NFL on Fox, NBA on CBS)
- Steve Stone, US, WGN-TV broadcaster
- Bert Sugar, US, boxing writer
- Suzyn Waldman, US, New York Yankees TV play-by-play announcer & current commentator/analyst for NY Yankees radio; first woman to hold either position on regular basis for Major League Baseball team
- Warner Wolf, US, sportscaster, w/CBS 9 in Washington, D.C. & CBS 2 in New York City, now w/WABC NewsTalkRadio 77 in NYC
- Lázaro Zilberman, better known as Marcelo Araujo, Argentina, sportscaster.

== See also ==
- List of Jews in sports

== Books ==
- Jews and Baseball: The Post-Greenberg Years, 1949–2008, Burton Alan Boxerman, Benita W. Boxerman, McFarland, 2010, ISBN 978-0-7864-2828-1
- The Baseball Talmud: The Definitive Position-by-Position Ranking of Baseball's Chosen Players, Howard Megdal, Collins, 2009, ISBN 978-0-06-155843-6
- Jews and the Sporting Life, Vol. 23 of Studies in Contemporary Jewry, Ezra Mendelsohn, Oxford University Press US, 2009, ISBN 978-0-19-538291-4
- Day by Day in Jewish Sports History, Bob Wechsler, KTAV Publishing House, 2008, ISBN 978-1-60280-013-7
- The Big Book of Jewish Athletes: Two Centuries of Jews in Sports – a Visual History, Peter S. Horvitz, Joachim Horvitz, S P I Books, 2007, ISBN 978-1-56171-927-3
- The Big Book of Jewish Sports Heroes: An Illustrated Compendium of Sports History and The 150 Greatest Jewish Sports Stars, Peter S. Horvitz, SP Books, 2007, ISBN 978-1-56171-907-5
- Jews, Sports, and the Rites of Citizenship, Jack Kugelmass, University of Illinois Press, 2007, ISBN 978-0-252-07324-3
- The New Big Book of Jewish Baseball: An Illustrated Encyclopedia & Anecdotal History, Peter S. Horvitz, Joachim Horvitz, Perseus Distribution Services, 2007, ISBN 978-1-56171-821-4
- Emancipation through Muscles: Jews and Sports in Europe, Michael Brenner, Gideon Reuveni, translated by Brenner, Reuveni, U of Nebraska Press, 2006, ISBN 978-0-8032-1355-5
- Judaism's Encounter with American Sports, Jeffrey S. Gurock, Indiana University Press, 2005, ISBN 978-0-253-34700-8
- Great Jews in Sports, Robert Slater, Jonathan David Publishers, 2004, ISBN 978-0-8246-0453-0
- Jews and the Olympic Games: The Clash between Sport and Politics: with a complete review of Jewish Olympic medallists, Paul Taylor, Sussex Academic Press, 2004, ISBN 978-1-903900-88-8
- The Big Book of Jewish Baseball: An Illustrated Encyclopedia & Anecdotal History, Peter S. Horvitz, Joachim Horvitz, SP Books, 2001, ISBN 978-1-56171-973-0
- Jewish Sports Legends: the International Jewish Hall of Fame, 3rd Ed, Joseph Siegman, Brassey's, 2000, ISBN 978-1-57488-284-1
- Sports and the American Jew, Steven A. Riess, Syracuse University Press, 1998, ISBN 978-0-8156-2754-8
- When Boxing was a Jewish Sport, Allen Bodner, Praeger, 1997, ISBN 978-0-275-95353-9
- Ellis Island to Ebbets Field: Sport and the American Jewish Experience, Peter Levine, Oxford University Press US, 1993, ISBN 978-0-19-508555-6
- The Jewish Child's Book of Sports Heroes, Robert Slater, Jonathan David Publishers, 1993, ISBN 978-0-8246-0360-1
- The International Jewish Sports Hall of Fame, Joseph M. Siegman, SP Books, 1992, ISBN 978-1-56171-028-7
- The Jewish Athletes Hall of Fame, B. P. Robert Stephen Silverman, Shapolsky Publishers, 1989, ISBN 978-0-944007-04-4
- The Jewish Boxers Hall of Fame, Ken Blady, SP Books, 1988, ISBN 978-0-933503-87-8
- The Jewish Baseball Hall of Fame: a Who's Who of Baseball Stars, Erwin Lynn, Shapolsky Publishers, 1986, ISBN 978-0-933503-17-5
- From the Ghetto to the Games: Jewish Athletes in Hungary, Andrew Handler, East European Monographs, 1985, ISBN 978-0-88033-085-5
- The Jew in American Sports, Harold Uriel Ribalow, Meir Z. Ribalow, Edition 4, Hippocrene Books, 1985, ISBN 978-0-88254-995-8
- Jewish Baseball Stars, Harold Uriel Ribalow, Meir Z. Ribalow, Hippocrene Books, 1984, ISBN 978-0-88254-898-2
- The Jewish Athlete: A Nostalgic View, Leible Hershfield, s.n., 1980
- Encyclopedia of Jews in Sports, Bernard Postal, Jesse Silver, Roy Silver, Bloch Pub. Co., 1965
