= Sprengers =

Sprengers is a surname. Notable people with the surname include:

- Jeu Sprengers (1938–2008), Dutch football official
- Thomas Sprengers (born 1990), Belgian cyclist
