= Michael van Praag =

Dutch football administrator and referee

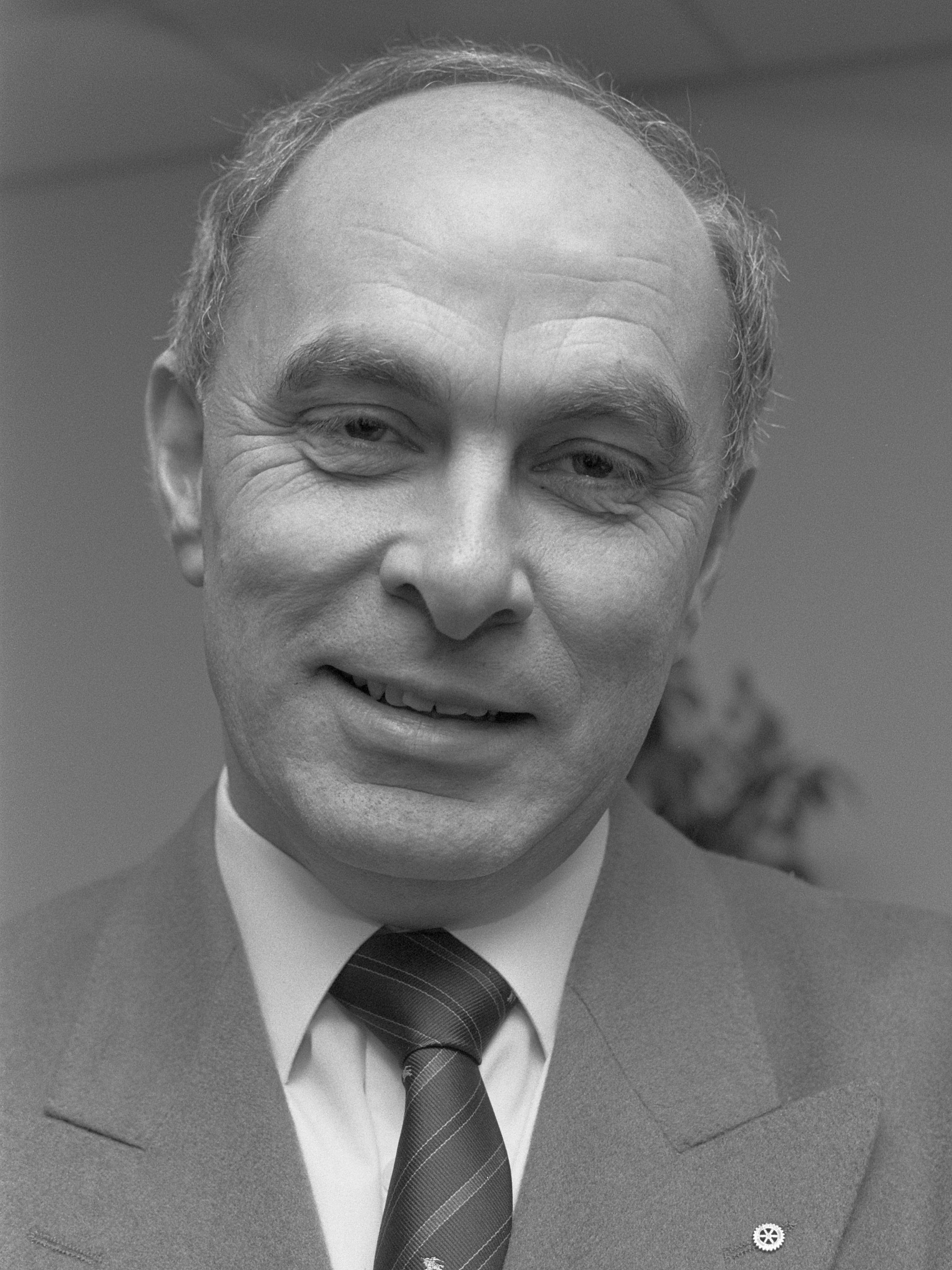
- Van Praag in 1989

Vice President of UEFA
- In office 30 June 2015 – 10 December 2019
- President: Michel Platini (2015); Ángel María Villar (Acting, 2015–2016); Aleksander Čeferin (2016–2021)
- Preceded by: David Gill
- Succeeded by: Karl-Erik Nilsson

Chairman of the UEFA Stadium and Security Committee
- Incumbent
- Assumed office 30 June 2015

President of the Royal Dutch Football Association
- In office 27 August 2008 – December 2019
- Preceded by: Jeu Sprengers
- Succeeded by: Just Spee

Chairman of Ajax
- In office 17 January 1989 – 1 July 2003
- Preceded by: Ton Harmsen
- Succeeded by: John Jaakke

Personal details
- Born: Michael van Praag; 28 September 1947 (age 79) Amsterdam, Netherlands
- Party: People's Party for Freedom and Democracy
- Spouse: Yvonne Mackaay (m. 2000)
- Children: 1 daughter
- Occupation: Football administrator Businessman; Corporate director

Michael van Praag (born 28 September 1947) is a Dutch football administrator and former referee. He was the President of the Royal Dutch Football Association from 27 August 2008 to December 2019 and a Vice President of the UEFA since 30 June 2015. Van Praag previously served as Chairman of Ajax from 1989 until 2003.

== Career ==
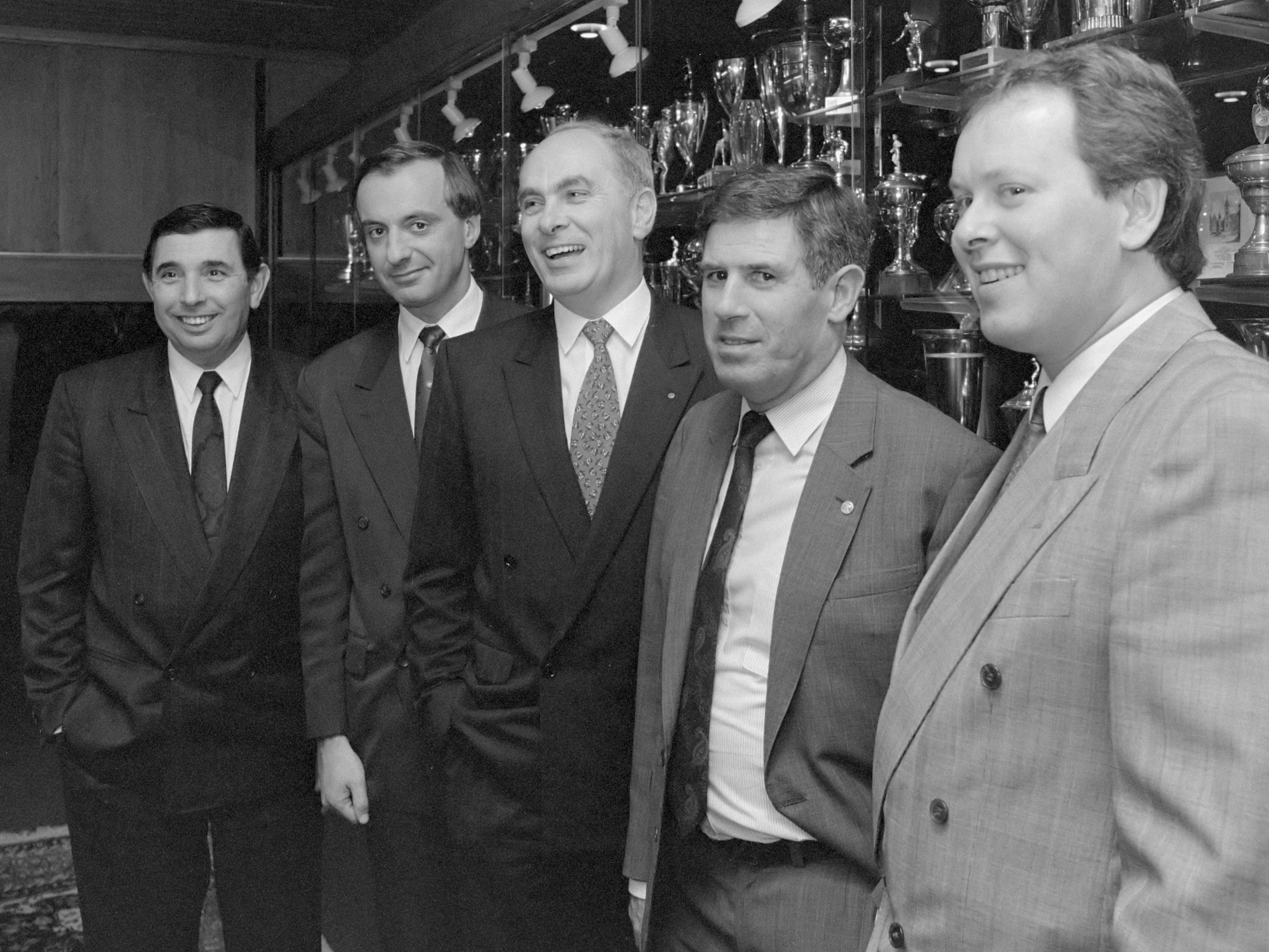
Van Praag (centre) with Arie van Os and Uri Coronel (left)

Van Praag was born in Amsterdam. He was Chairman of Ajax from 1989 until mid-2003. His father, Jaap van Praag, was also Chairman of the Amsterdam club from 1964 until 1978. Originally, Van Praag was a referee in the Amateur football leagues of the Netherlands and he later made his fortune with his franchise electronic stores that were situated in various airports before he became the chairman of the club.

The period in which Van Praag was Chairman of the club was one of the most successful in the club's history, second only to the tenure served by his father. Ajax won the UEFA Cup in 1992, and the UEFA Champions League and the Intercontinental Cup titles in 1995 under Van Praag's administration. On 27 August 2008, he was chosen as the new chairman of the Royal Dutch Football Association (KNVB) succeeding the previous chairman Jeu Sprengers who had died in April. His predecessor during his tenure at Ajax was Ton Harmsen and he was succeeded by John Jaakke.

Van Praag is a member of the Executive Committee of UEFA, the Chairman of the association's Club Competitions Committee and is a Deputy Chairman of the HatTrick Committee. He and his father are the only father and son chairmen combination to have both led their club to continental success with Ajax winning a combined four European championships under their guidance.

=== FIFA and UEFA presidential bids ===
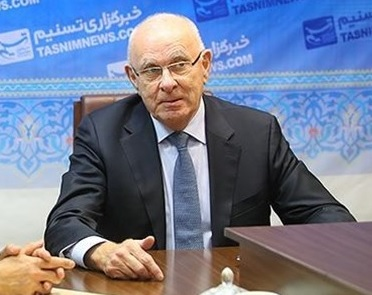
Van Praag during his visit in Iran in 2016

On 26 January 2015, Van Praag announced his intention to run against incumbent Sepp Blatter in the 2015 FIFA presidential election. Van Praag stated: "I am very worried about the deteriorating situation at FIFA. The public opinion, the trustworthiness, is very bad, and with me a lot of people in the world believe so." He was seen as a consensus and reliable candidate, supporting a limitation of the powers attributed to the FIFA President. He campaigned on the publication of the Garcia Report and a new Executive Committee vote if the 2022 World Cup attribution corruption allegations were to be proved. He also advocated for less bureaucracy in Zurich and a regulation of workers' conditions in football stadiums. He stated he would not seek reelection if elected.

On 21 May 2015, just a few days before the elections, he announced his withdrawal from FIFA presidential race to support Ali bin Hussein, stating he believed he had the best shot at the presidency. Candidate Luís Figo did the same. Blatter was however reelected, although he had to resign four days after the election because of corruption allegations.

Later that year, he became Vice President of the UEFA, named by President Michel Platini. On 14 September 2016, Van Praag received 13 votes in the election of the vacant office of UEFA President, losing to Aleksander Čeferin who got 42 votes.

== Family ==
Michael van Praag comes from a prominent family in the Netherlands of entertainers and business people. Unlike his father, he is not officially Jewish since his mother was not. He has three sisters; Peggy, Pamela and TV Host and Actor Beryl van Praag. The famous singer Max van Praag is his uncle whose children, former newsreader Marga van Praag and her brother Chiel van Praag are his cousins.

== See also ==
- List of Jews in sports (non-players)

Sporting positions
Preceded by Ton Harmsen	Chairman of Ajax; 1989–2003	Succeeded by John Jaakke
Preceded by Jeu Sprengers	President of the Royal Dutch Football Association; 2008–2018	Succeeded by Just Spee
Preceded by David Gill	Vice President of UEFA; 2015–present	Succeeded by Incumbent
