= Alejandro Romay =

Argentine businessman (1927–2015)

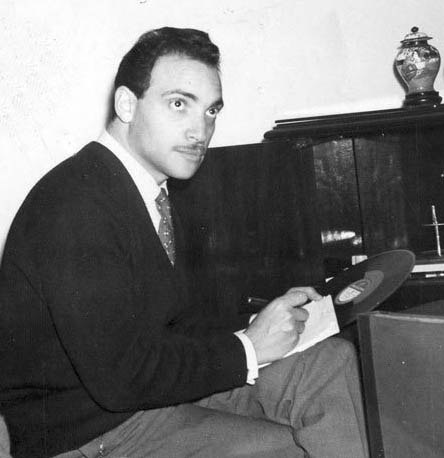
- Romay in the 1960s
- Born: January 20, 1927; San Miguel de Tucumán, Argentina
- Died: June 25, 2015 (aged 88); Buenos Aires, Argentina
- Other name: Zar de la televisión
- Years active: 1940–1997
- Board member of: Channel 9

Alejandro Romay (born Alejandro Argentino Saúl, January 20, 1927 – June 25, 2015) was an Argentine businessman and media mogul. He worked for many years at Canal 9 (known under his management as Canal 9 Libertad), and became known as the "Czar of television".

== Biography ==
Romay started his career in 1940 as radio host at LV 7 Radio Tucumán, at the Tucumán province. He acquired LV 12 Radio Aconquija in 1945, and two years later he moved to Buenos Aires. He kept working as radio host, but started working as well as a radio, TV and theater producer. He became the largest shareholder of Channel 9 in 1963, and director of it.

By the 1970s Romay was a top rival to fellow media mogul Goar Mestre. Romay lost Channel 9 when it was nationalized in 1974 and moved to Puerto Rico, where he acquired two radio stations.

Romay returned to Buenos Aires in 1983, when Raúl Alfonsín took power, and acquired back Channel 9. He created Telearte S.A. to manage its programming, and the channel became Argentina's ratings leader for the rest of the 1980s. The 1990s initially saw his media empire expand: he acquired Radio Belgrano (es:Radio Belgrano), which had been state-owned, as well as a Buenos Aires cable system (BAC). In addition, he bought a Miami television station, WJAN, which later was run by his son Omar Romay. He also owned a theater in Buenos Aires and another one in Madrid.

In 1997, Romay retired and began to sell off his media assets. The radio stations went to Grupo CIE of Mexico, while Canal 9 Libertad was sold to Prime Television of Australia and Grupo Clarín's Multicanal cable systems absorbed BAC. He was awarded an honorary Martín Fierro Award in 2003.

At the time of his death in June 2015, he was writing an autobiography. His remains are buried at the La Tablada Israelite Cemetery.
