= Natacha Jaitt =

Argentine model and actress (1977–2019)

- Born: 13 August 1977; Buenos Aires, Argentina
- Died: 23 February 2019 (aged 41); Benavídez, Buenos Aires Province, Argentina
- Occupations: Model, actress, screenwriter, radio and television host
- Children: 2

Natacha Jaitt (13 August 1977 – 23 February 2019) was an Argentine model, actress, screenwriter and radio and television host.

== Career ==
After briefly working as a model for porn magazines, Natacha Jaitt emigrated to Spain. She chose the country randomly, and arrived with just ten dollars. She sought to be in the Gran Hermano competition, the Spanish incarnation of the Big Brother franchise. She was accepted as a reserved housemate for the sixth season, as she had not finished the immigration procedures yet. Mercedes left the program on the first day, which allowed Jaitt to enter the house. She stayed in the program until the final voting, and ended in the third position, with 15% of the vote. She was both the first foreign contestant and the first reserve to get that far into the program.

After the end of the program, she worked as a panelist at Crónicas marcianas, with journalist Javier Sardà. She also became the host of Sexual office, a program on the Playboy TV network. She hosted the radio program Esclava de tu agujero ("Slave of Your Hole") on 99.1 Loca FM. She posed for the magazines Interviú, Playboy, Hombre and Paparazzi.

She returned to Argentina in 2007. She sponsored the International Festival of Erotic Cinema of Buenos Aires, alongside Dunia Montenegro, Sonia Baby and Nacho Vidal. She also hosted the TV program Sexo seguro ("Safe Sex"), again on Playboy TV. She was interviewed by journalist Chiche Gelblung, and had an orgasm on live television.

She made her first theater play in 2008, Caliente ("Hot"), at the Lorange. It was produced by Gerardo Sofovich. She joined the Bailando por un Sueño tournament, hosted by Marcelo Tinelli, and lost in the first round. In 2009, she hosted Natacha enciende tus sentidos ("Natacha Ignites Your Senses") on América TV.

She had a relationship with the actor Adrián Yospe and had a son, Valentino, with him. She also had a daughter, Antonella.

== Legal issues ==
=== Diego Latorre extortion case ===
Jaitt was accused in 2017 with extortion charges, as she allegedly blackmailed sports journalist and former football player Diego Latorre for $350,000. The alleged blackmail was about material of Latorre having sex with other people. During the ensuing controversy, it was revealed that Latorre, who was married, had an extramarital affair with Jaitt herself.

=== Complaints about sexual abuse of minors ===
There was an investigation about sexual abuse of minors at the Club Atlético Independiente in 2018. One of the players denounced four phone numbers that were allegedly used to pay children to have sex with adults. Jaitt said while as guest on the program La noche de Mirtha that those numbers belonged to journalists and politicians. Journalist Mercedes Ninci and sports author Gustavo Grabia, also on the program, criticized her for making unsubstantiated allegations on television. The program's host Mirtha Legrand apologized later for having invited Jaitt to the program, saying that she initially refused to accept her but accepted by network request, and that she did not ask her to leave the program in mid-air because she supports free expression.

Jaitt testified to the prosecutor of the Office of Avellaneda, which led to seven people being detained. Leonardo Cohen Arazi and Martín Bustos were acquitted on the grounds that there was no abuse, but promotion of prostitution.

=== Rape report ===
Natacha Jaitt said in 2019 that film director Pablo Yotich and his friend Maximiliano Giusto drugged and raped her. She attended a judicial hearing in the related case, which would be her last public appearance.

== Death ==
On 5 April 2018, Jaitt had made a post on her personal Twitter account, warning her followers that she was not intending to commit suicide, writing "NOTICE: I am not going to kill myself, I am not going to overdose on coke and drown in a bath tub, I am not going to shoot myself in the head, so if that happens, NO I DIDN'T DO IT. Save this tweet."

Natacha Jaitt was found dead on 23 February 2019, naked in a bed at a party hall in Benavídez, Tigre, on the outskirts of Buenos Aires. The initial police reports stated that there seemed to be no signs of violence against her, but her lawyer detected inconsistencies in the report and said that Jaitt was murdered. Jaitt's remains were buried in the La Tablada Israelite Cemetery.

On 27 February 2019, Argentinian businessman and producer Raúl Velaztiqui was arrested for false testimony regarding Natacha Jaitt's death, having lied about the circumstances of her death.

== Filmography ==
Television

- Gran Hermano (2004)
- Crónicas marcianas (2005)
- Sexo seguro (2006-2007)
- Consultorio sexual (2007)
- Bailando por un Sueño (2008)
- Natacha y Nino hacen una porno (2009)
- Natacha enciende tus sentidos (2009)
- Natacha de Noche (2010)

Theater

- Caliente (2008)
- Es lo que hay (2009)

Radio

- Esclava de tu agujero (2005-2008) 99.1 Loca FM (Madrid, Spain)
- Natacha Jaitt (2012-2015) Radiopalermo FM 93.9
- El ascensor (2015-2019) Radio Belgrano AM 950 (2015-2016) / Mega 98.3 (2017) / Radio Ga-Ga (2018-2019)
