= La Tablada Israelite Cemetery =

Jewish cemetery in La Tablada, Argentina

- Cementerio Israelita de La Tablada
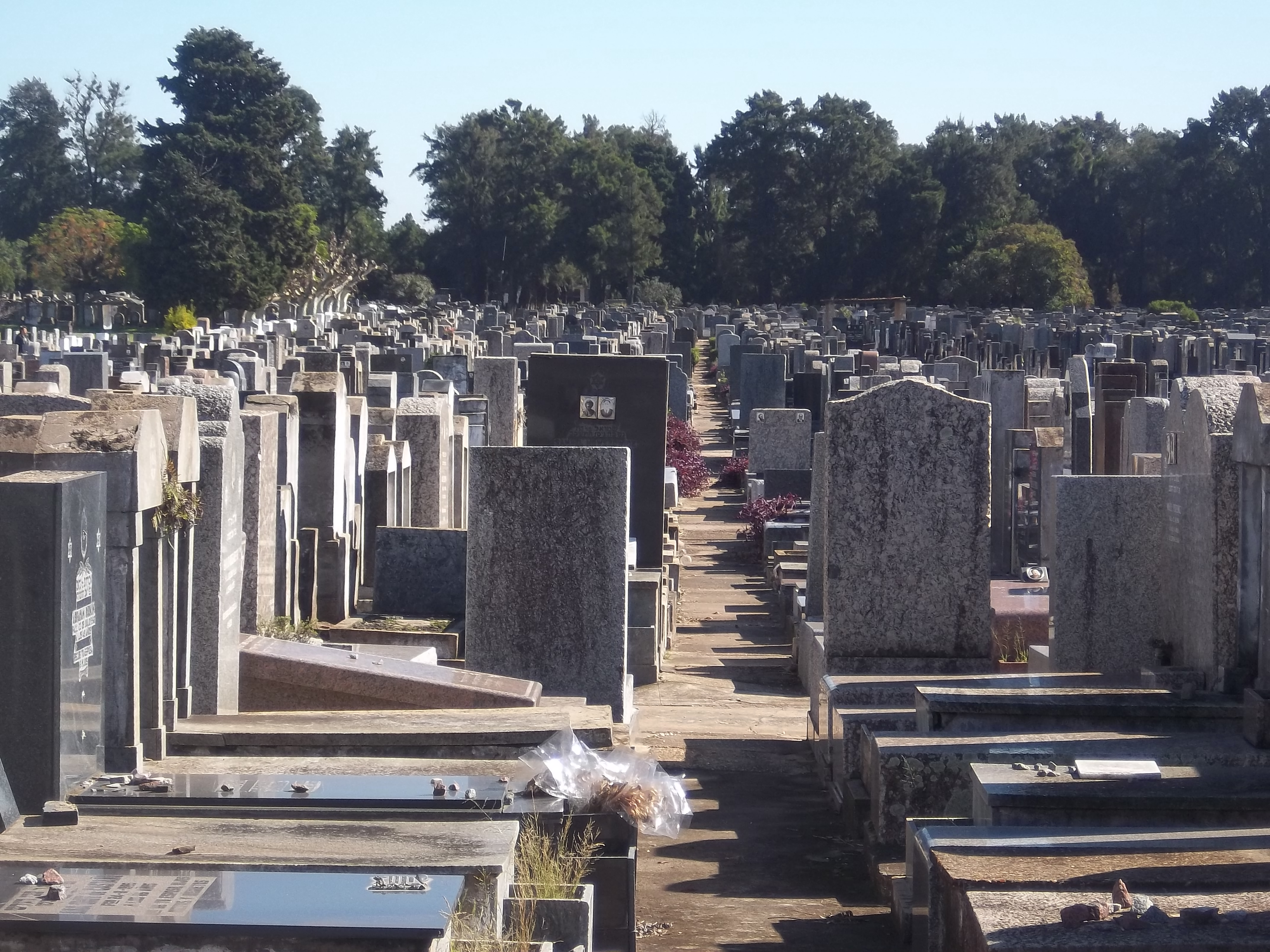
- "Old Part" of the cemetery
- Interactive map of La Tablada Israelite Cemetery

Details
- Established: 1936
- Location: La Tablada, Buenos Aires
- Country: Argentina
- Coordinates: 34°41′14″S 58°31′33″W
- Type: Jewish
- Owned by: Asociación Mutual Israelita Argentina
- No. of graves: +150,000
- Find a Grave: La Tablada Israelite Cemetery

The La Tablada Israelite Cemetery (Spanish: Cementerio Israelita de La Tablada), also known simply as La Tablada Cemetery, is a Jewish cemetery located in the city of La Tablada, in the Greater Buenos Aires conurbation of Argentina. It was established in 1936 and is operated by the Asociación Mutual Israelita Argentina (AMIA).

Housing over 150,000 graves, it is the largest Jewish cemetery in Latin America.

== Vandalism ==
La Tablada Cemetery has been subject to frequent vandalism, often of anti-semitic nature. In 1999, 62 headstones were damaged on the eve of Yom Kippur. In 2021, over 100 headstones were smashed, echoing a similar vandalic event in 2009. In 2022, over 300 plaques were stolen and a monument in remembrance of the 1994 AMIA bombing was damaged.

== Notable burials ==
- Pepe Eliaschev (1945–2014), journalist and writer
- Jorge Guinzburg (1949–2008), journalist and TV host
- Natacha Jaitt (1978–2019), model and TV host
- Miguel Najdorf (1910–1997), chess champion
- Alberto Nisman (1963–2015), lawyer and prosecutor
- Alejandro Romay (1927–2015), businessman and media mogul
- Alejandra Pizarnik (1936–1972), poet and translator
- Efim Schachmeister (1894-1944), jazz violinist and conductor
- Mauro Viale (1947–2021), journalist
