= Pepe Eliaschev =

Journalist and writer

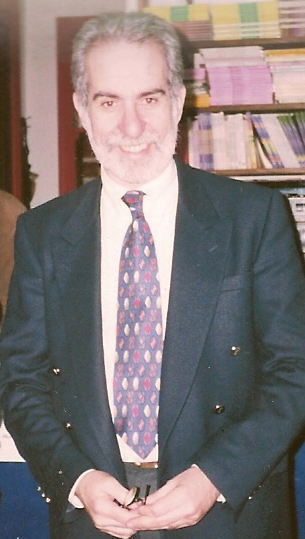
- Born: José Ricardo Eliaschev; 31 May 1945; Buenos Aires, Argentina
- Died: 18 November 2014 (aged 69); Buenos Aires, Argentina
- Occupations: Journalist, writer

José Ricardo Eliaschev (31 May 1945 – 18 November 2014), better known as Pepe Eliaschev, was an Argentine journalist and writer.

The author of ten books, he worked as a journalist and was well known for interviewing world figures such as Muhammad Ali, Ted Kennedy, Jorge Rafael Videla, Raúl Alfonsín, José Mujica, Eduardo Frei Ruiz-Tagle, Carlos Fuentes, Mario Vargas Llosa, Ernesto Sabato and Augusto Roa Bastos. In addition, he was director of the Municipal Radio of Buenos Aires from 1989 to 1991. His last radio show was Esto que pasa.

== Personal life ==
Eliaschev was born on 31 May 1945 in Buenos Aires, the grandson of Jewish immigrants from Podolia (present-day Ukraine) and Kishinev (present-day Moldova) who arrived to Argentina in the early 20th century fleeing Czarist pogroms.

He died on 18 November 2014, aged 69, of pancreatic cancer. He is buried at the La Tablada Israelite Cemetery.
