= Adrián Yospe =

Argentine actor (1970–2011)

- Born: Adrián Ezequiel Yospe; 12 February 1970; Buenos Aires, Argentina
- Died: 10 November 2011 (aged 41); San Isidro, Buenos Aires, Argentina
- Occupation: Actor
- Years active: 1991–2011
- Partner: Natacha Jaitt (2005–2007)
- Children: 1

Adrián Ezequiel Yospe (12 February 1970 – 10 November 2011) was an Argentine actor. He appeared in 13 films between 1991 and 2011.

== Filmography ==
- La peste (1991)
- Caballos salvajes (1995)
- Más allá del límite (1995)
- La maestra normal (1996)
- Pizza, birra, faso (1997)
- Es todo (1999)
- La venganza (1999)
- La casa de Tourner (2001)
- ¿Y dónde está el bebé? (2002)
- Apasionados (2002)
- Dibu 3, la gran aventura (2002)
- 555 (2011)
- Juan y Eva (2011)
