= Alejandra Pizarnik =

Argentine poet (1936–1972)

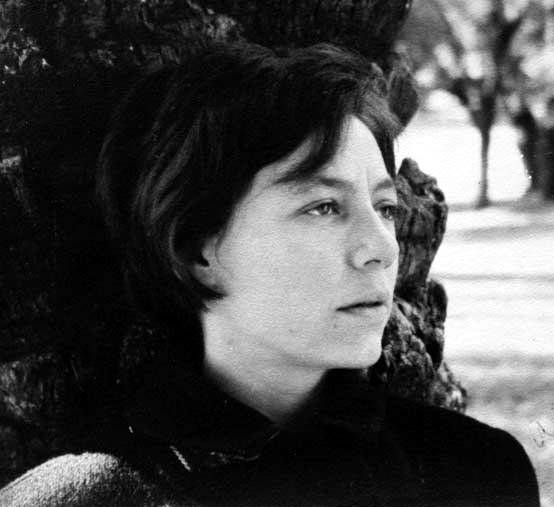
- Photograph of Pizarnik by Sara Facio
- Born: Flora Pizarnik; 29 April 1936 Avellaneda, Argentina
- Died: 25 September 1972 (aged 36) Buenos Aires, Argentina
- Resting place: La Tablada Israelite Cemetery
- Occupation: Poet

Flora Alejandra Pizarnik (29 April 1936 – 25 September 1972) was an Argentine poet. Her idiosyncratic and thematically introspective poetry has been considered "one of the most unusual bodies of work in Latin American literature", and has been recognized and celebrated for its fixation on "the limitation of language, silence, the body, night, the nature of intimacy, madness, [and] death".

Pizarnik studied philosophy at the University of Buenos Aires and worked as a writer and a literary critic for several publishers and magazines. She lived in Paris between 1960 and 1964, where she translated authors such as Antonin Artaud, Henri Michaux, Aimé Césaire and Yves Bonnefoy. She also studied history of religion and French literature at the Sorbonne. Back in Buenos Aires, Pizarnik published three of her major works: Works and Nights, Extracting the Stone of Madness, and The Musical Hell as well as a prose work titled The Bloody Countess. In 1969 she received a Guggenheim Fellowship and later, in 1971, a Fulbright Fellowship.

On 25 September 1972, she died by suicide after ingesting an overdose of secobarbital. Her work has influenced generations of authors in Latin America.

== Biography ==
=== Early life ===
Flora Pizarnik was born on 29 April 1936, in Avellaneda in the Greater Buenos Aires metropolitan area of Argentina, to Jewish immigrant parents from Rovno in the Russian Empire (now Rivne, Ukraine), Elías Pizarnik (Pozharnik) and Rejzla Bromiker. Her parents left the Soviet Union and arrived in Argentina in 1934, the same year in which her older sister, Myriam, was born. She had a difficult childhood, struggling with acne and self-esteem issues, as well as having a stutter. She adopted the name Alejandra as a teenager. As an adult, she had a clinical diagnosis of schizophrenia.

=== Career ===
A year after entering the University of Buenos Aires, Pizarnik published her first book of poetry, The Most Foreign Country (1955). She took courses in literature, journalism, and philosophy, but dropped out in order to pursue painting with Juan Batlle Planas. Pizarnik followed her debut work with two more volumes of poems, The Last Innocence (1956) and The Lost Adventures (1958). She was an avid reader of fiction and poetry. Beginning with novels, she delved into more literature with similar topics to learn from different points of view. This sparked an early interest in literature and also for the unconscious, which in turn gave rise to her interest in psychoanalysis. Pizarnik’s involvement in Surrealist methods of expression was represented by her automatic writing techniques.

Her lyricism was influenced by Antonio Porchia, French symbolists—especially Arthur Rimbaud and Stéphane Mallarmé—, the spirit of romanticism and by the surrealists. She wrote prose poems, in the spirit of Octavio Paz, but from a woman's perspective on issues ranging from loneliness, childhood, and death. Pizarnik was bisexual/lesbian but in much of her work references to relationships with women were self-censored due to the oppressive nature of the Argentine dictatorship she lived under.

Between 1960 and 1964 Pizarnik lived in Paris, where she worked for the magazine Cuadernos and other French editorials. She published poems and criticism in many newspapers, translated Antonin Artaud, Henri Michaux, Aimé Césaire, Yves Bonnefoy and Marguerite Duras. She also studied French religious history and literature at the Sorbonne. There she became friends with Julio Cortázar, Rosa Chacel, Silvina Ocampo and Octavio Paz. Paz even wrote the prologue for her fourth poetry book, Diana's Tree (1962). A famous sequence on Diana reads: "I jumped from myself to dawn/I left my body next to the light/and sang the sadness of being born." She returned to Buenos Aires in 1964, and published her best-known books of poetry: Works and Nights (1965), Extracting the Stone of Madness (1968) and The Musical Hell (1971). She was awarded a Guggenheim Fellowship in 1968, and in 1971 a Fulbright Scholarship.

== Death ==
Pizarnik died by suicide on 25 September 1972 after overdosing on secobarbital, at the age of 36, on the same weekend she left the hospital where she had been institutionalized. She is buried at the Cementerio Israelita in La Tablada, Buenos Aires Province.

== Books ==
- Alejandra Pizarnik: Selected Poems
  - translated by Cecilia Rossi, Waterloo Press, 2010. ISBN 978-1-906742-24-9
- The Most Foreign Country (1955)
  - translated by Yvette Siegert (Ugly Duckling Presse, October 2015)
- The Last Innocence/The Lost Adventures (1956/1958)
  - translated by Cecilia Rossi (Ugly Duckling Presse, 2019)
- Diana's Tree (1962)
  - translated by Yvette Siegert (Ugly Duckling Presse, October 2014); translated by Anna Deeny Morales (Shearsman Books, 2020)
- Works and Nights (1965)
  - translated by Yvette Siegert (in Extracting the Stone of Madness: Poems 1962-1972, New Directions, September 2015)
- Extracting the Stone of Madness (1968)
  - translated by Yvette Siegert (in Extracting the Stone of Madness: Poems 1962-1972, New Directions, September 2015)
- A Musical Hell (1971)
  - translated by Yvette Siegert (New Directions, July 2013; reprinted in Extracting the Stone of Madness: Poems 1962-1972 by New Directions, September 2015)
- The Bloody Countess (1971)
  - Exchanging Lives: Poems and Translations, Translator Susan Bassnett, Peepal Tree, 2002. ISBN 978-1-900715-66-9

== See also ==
- Argentine literature
- Latin American literature
- Prose poetry
- Latin American poetry
