= Just Spee =

Dutch football administrator

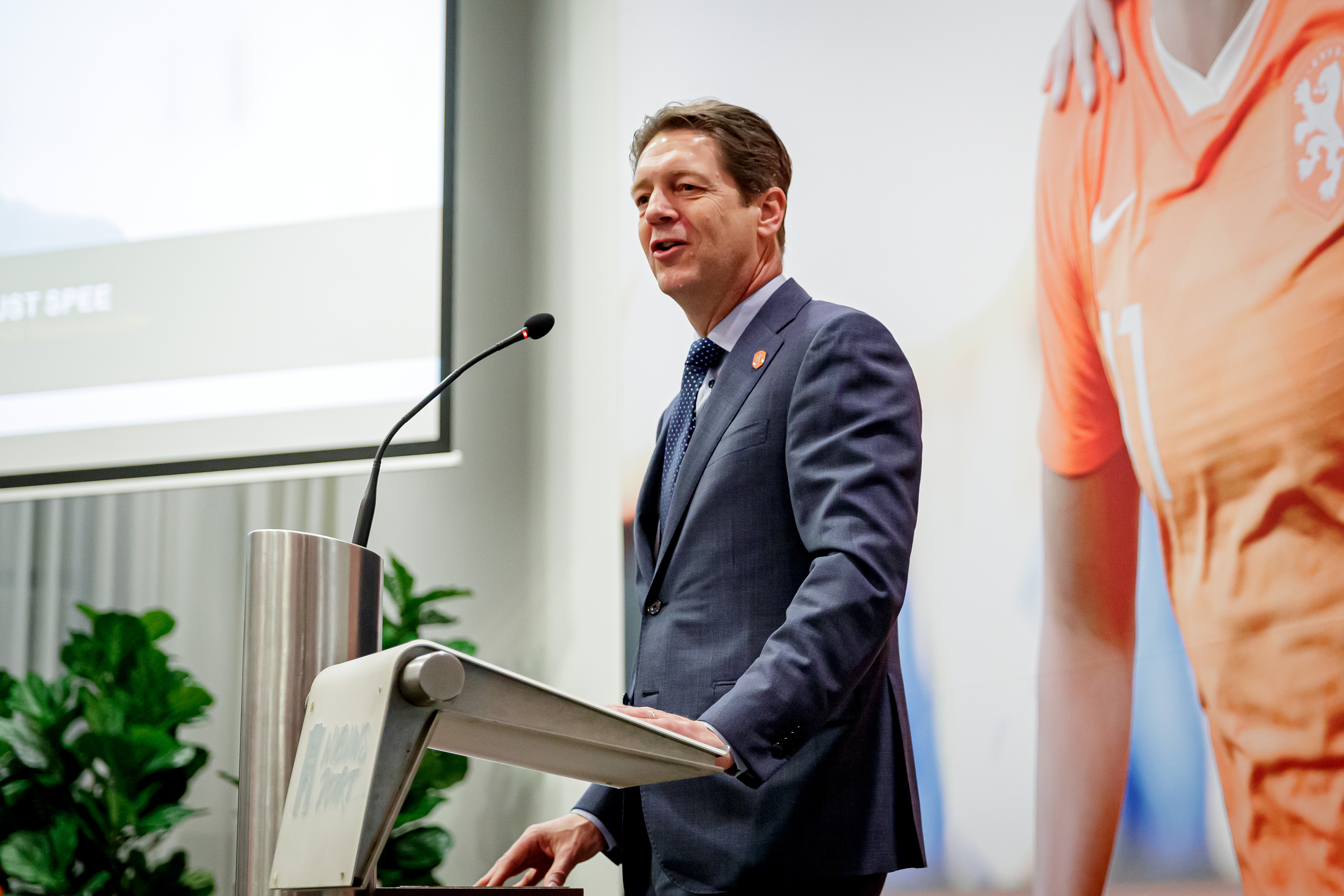
- KNVB World Coaches 10 years Anniversary

President of the Royal Dutch Football Association
- In office 17 December 2019 – 1 December 2023
- Preceded by: Michael van Praag
- Succeeded by: Frank Paauw

Personal details
- Born: Just Spee; 12 January 1965 (age 61) Haarlem, Netherlands
- Education: Vrije Universiteit
- Occupation: Football administrator Businessman

Just Spee (born 12 January 1965) is a Dutch football administrator. From 17 December 2019 to 1 December 2023 he had as President of the Royal Netherlands Football Association (KNVB).

== Background and career ==
Just Spee was born in Haarlem on 12 January 1965. After his Master Business/Managerial Econometrics at the Vrije Universiteit (Free University of Amsterdam), he started working in business. Spee has worked as a manager at companies such as Procter & Gamble, Philips, Rothmans and Alvarez & Marsal. In 2012 Spee became CEO of Endemol, the biggest independent TV producer in the world. Hereafter, Spee became CEO at Stage Entertainment. Just Spee is a member of the Supervisory Boards of various companies and civil society organizations such as the OLVG hospital (Amsterdam) and UNICEF Netherlands. Furthermore, he was a mentor for Future Female Leaders.

=== Career in football ===
Just Spee played football at the Royal Haarlem Football Club (Koninklijke HFC). Later he became a member of the board of this football club. Spee had already come into contact with football during his career in business as a member of the Supervisory Board of the Eredivisie Media & Marketing CV. At the end of May 2019, Spee was elected as President of the KNVB. In December 2019 he officially took office as the successor of Michael van Praag.

Spee was elected as a member of the Executive Committee, the highest executive organ of UEFA, in April 2021.
