= Jorge Guinzburg =

Argentine journalist and broadcaster

Jorge Ariel Guinzburg
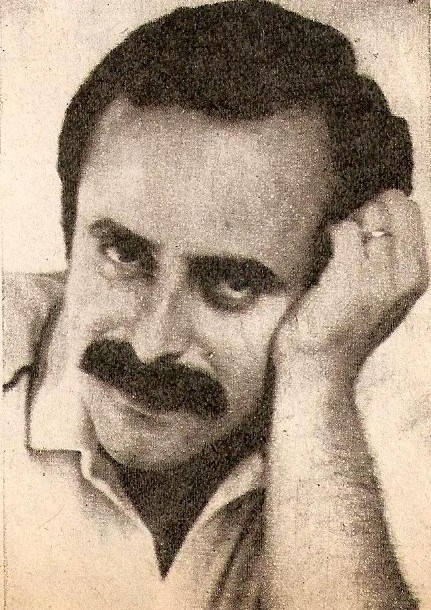
- Born: 3 February 1949; Buenos Aires, Argentina
- Died: 12 March 2008 (aged 59); Buenos Aires, Argentina
- Spouse(s): Dora Ryng; Andrea Stivel
- Children: Soledad, Malena, Ian, Sacha
- Parent(s): Benjamín Guinzburg; Eugenia Bartfeld
- Awards: Martín Fierro Award 1998 Radio Entertainer/Broadcaster (El Ventilador); Platinum Konex Award 2001 Host of the Decade; Argentores Award 2002, 2003 Best Television Sketch (Guinzburg & Kids) INTE Award 2003 Best Children's Show (El Legado Kids); Martín Fierro Award 2005 Outstanding TV Host (Mañanas Informales); Clarín Entertainment Award 2005, 2006, 2007, 2008 Outstanding TV Host (Mañanas Informales)

Jorge Ariel Guinzburg (3 February 1949 – 12 March 2008) was an Argentine journalist, theatrical producer, humorist, and TV and radio host.

== Background ==
Guinzburg was born on 3 February 1949 to a Jewish family in Buenos Aires. He graduated from high school in 1966, along with Carlos Abrevaya. In 1967, Guinzburg and Abrevaya entered the law school but they abandoned their college education soon afterwards. Later on, Guinzburg joined the drama school while he worked as a taxi driver. In 1971, he became scriptwriter for Juan Carlos Mareco and some time later for the Fontana Show.

== Career ==
Abrevaya and Guinzburg became members of Satiricón by 1972 and, according to writer Carlos Ulanovsky, both boys were funny, amiable and good natured.

In 1977, Guinzburg and Abrevaya started publishing a comic called Diógenes y el Linyera in Clarín, one of the most popular newspapers in Buenos Aires.

Guinzburg created more than twenty radio shows such as: El ventilador and Vitamina G. He worked for several advertising agencies and won several awards for his labor. He starred, directed and produced many theater plays. In TV, he wrote and hosted numerous comedy, news and game shows like Peor es nada, El Legado, La Biblia y el Calefón and Mañanas Informales.

== Death ==
Guinzburg died in the Mater Dei clinic on 2008-3-12. He was in the clinic six days before his death because he suffered the fracture of a vertebra. He was affected by a pulmonary disease (a pleural effusion and a pneumonia generated from a lung cancer). He was 59 at the time of his death. Guinzburg was buried at the La Tablada Israelite Cemetery. His grave lays close to the grave of Jaime Barylko, who died in 2002.

== Family ==
Guinzburg married twice. With his first wife, Dora Ryng, he had two daughters, Soledad and Malena Guinzburg (currently a stand-up comedian). With his second wife, TV producer Andrea Stivel, he had two sons, Ian and Sacha.
