= Mauro Viale =

Argentine journalist (1947–2021)

- Born: Mauricio Goldfarb; 28 August 1947; Buenos Aires, Argentina
- Died: 11 April 2021 (aged 73); Buenos Aires, Argentina

Mauricio Goldfarb (28 August 1947 – 11 April 2021), better known as Mauro Viale, was an Argentine journalist and television presenter. He started out in sports and later turned to general and entertainment journalism.

== Biography ==
Viale started his career in the 1970s as a sports journalist and transmitting matches of the Argentine Primera División and later of the 1978 FIFA World Cup as well as of the 1986 FIFA World Cup.

By age, Viale belonged to the so-called risk groups, which is why he was vaccinated with the Sinopharm BIBP COVID-19 vaccine on April 8, 2021. Two days later, however, he was admitted to the Sanatorio Los Arcos in the Buenos Aires neighborhood of Palermo, due to bilateral pneumonia and symptoms of COVID-19, a disease for which he tested positive after taking the test. He died on April 11 from cardiac arrest at the age of 73. His remains are buried at the La Tablada Israelite Cemetery.
