= Jaap van Praag (football administrator) =

Dutch football administrator

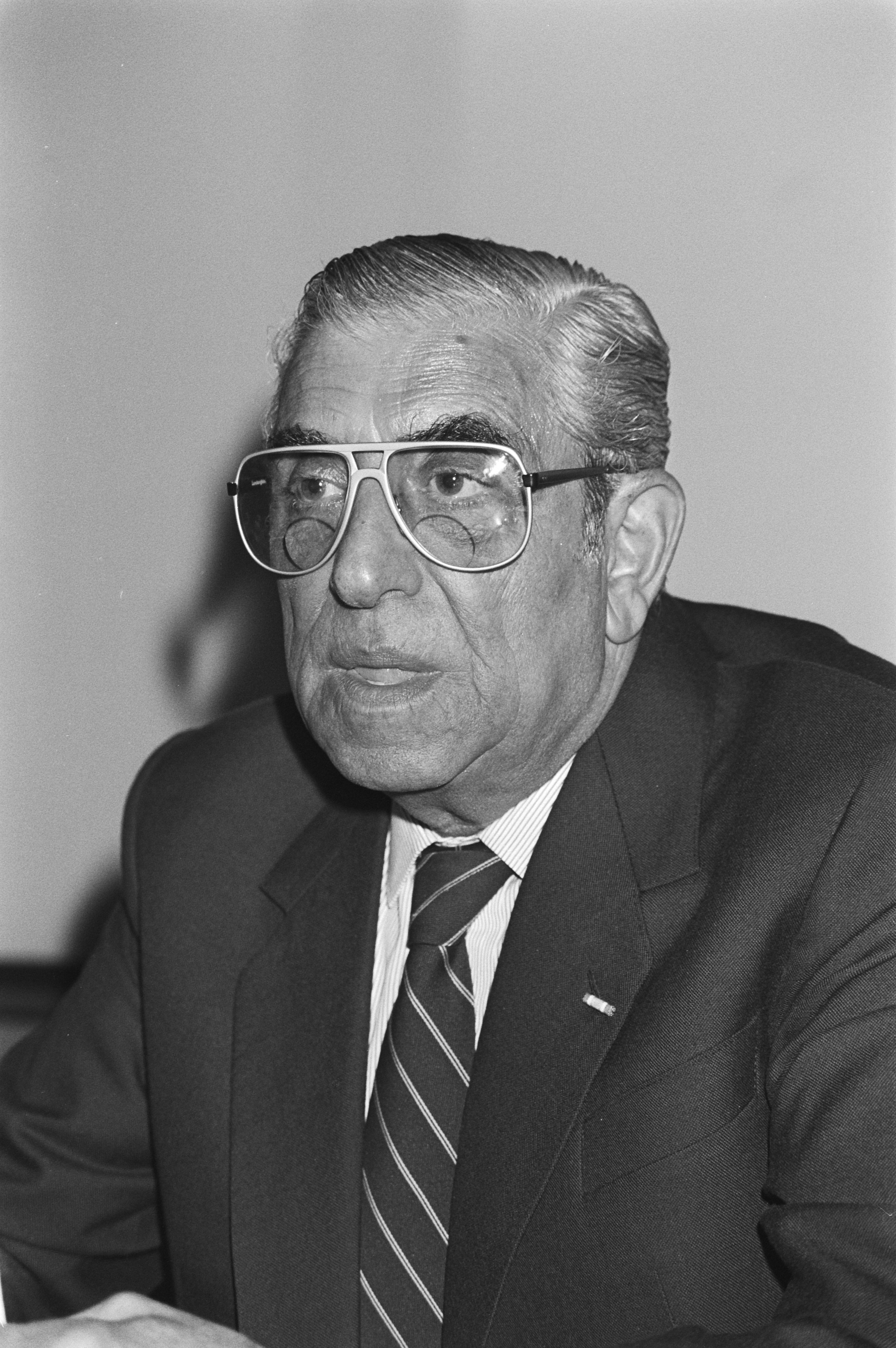
Jaap van Praag in 1981

Jacob "Jaap" van Praag (Dutch pronunciation: [ˈjaːkɔp ˈjaːp fɑm ˈpraːx]; 10 July 1910 – 7 August 1987) was a Dutch football administrator and chairman for local football club Ajax.

== Early life ==
Jaap van Praag began his professional career working in the musical business of his father in Amsterdam, where he was born. Unlike his father, he saw great potential in the gramophone record and started his own business on the Spui downtown, called His Master's Voice. He was forced into hiding due to the persecution of Jews during World War II where he first found refuge staying with the uncle of former Ajax player Wim Schoevaart. Two and a half years later he was hiding over a photo store on the Overtoom (Amsterdam). He was forced to sit still in a chair, motionless, and not move, because the owner of the store did not even know he was there. His first wife during this time was not Jewish and did not go into hiding with him, and left him for another man during this period.

The parents of Jaap van Praag and his sister were murdered in Auschwitz.

After the war, he remained an active businessman in the music world. He was also active in television, and in 1962 he hosted the game show Onbekend Talent (Unknown Talent) for the VARA, which was one of the first programs that gave young talent a chance on television.

== Career ==
In 1964, Jaap van Praag became chairman of the Dutch Association football club Ajax, and the club's golden age began. The club had just narrowly escaped relegation the previous season, so van Praag decided to hire former Ajax attacker Rinus Michels as the new head coach. Together, they took the club to new professional heights, with the financial help of Maup Caransa and the Van der Meijden brothers amongst others. The Van der Meijden brothers were known to have collaborated with the Nazis during World War II, and are widely known as the bunkerbouwers (bunker builders). Van Praag was legendary and admitted that he never had a difficulty lying if it was ever in the interest of his club. Famous in this respect is the statement by Johan Cruyff on van Praag, stating that he was never able to catch him in a truth. Under the guidance of van Praag, Ajax won the European Cup three times in a row from 1971 to 1973. He was succeeded at Ajax by Ton Harmsen. In 1987, van Praag died at age 77 in a traffic accident in his hometown of Amsterdam. Cees van Cuilenborg, the then C.E.O. of Voetbal International, described the life of van Praag in his obituary as a life with a smile .

== Family ==
Van Praag had four children from two marriages. From his second marriage, he had a daughter named Peggy and a son named Michael. His son Michael van Praag would later follow in his fathers footsteps and was also chairman of Ajax during another very successful period at the club. His son served this function from 1989 to 2003. From his third marriage, he had two daughters, Pamela and the TV host and Actor Beryl van Praag.

His younger brother is Max van Praag, who became a known singer. The newsreader Marga van Praag and Television presenter Chiel van Praag are his children, and van Praag is their uncle.

== Name confusion ==
There is another Jaap van Praag, his namesake, a politician with whom he is often confused. Both were around the same age (born 1910 and 1911), both born in Amsterdam and both survived the war hiding in the city. In addition, both played a role in broadcasting for the VARA.

== See also ==
- AFC Ajax
- History of AFC Ajax
- Marga van Praag
- Michael van Praag

== Bibliography ==
- (in English) nl: Simon Kuper, Ajax, the Dutch, the War: The Strange Tale of Soccer During Europe's Darkest Hour, Nation Books, New York, 2012, ISBN 978-1-56858-723-3
- (in Dutch) nl: Marga van Praag and nl: Ad van Liempt, Jaap en Max: het verhaal van de broers Van Praag, Nijgh & Van Ditmar, Rotterdam, 2011, ISBN 903-8-8947-08
