= Jeu Sprengers =

Dutch football chairman

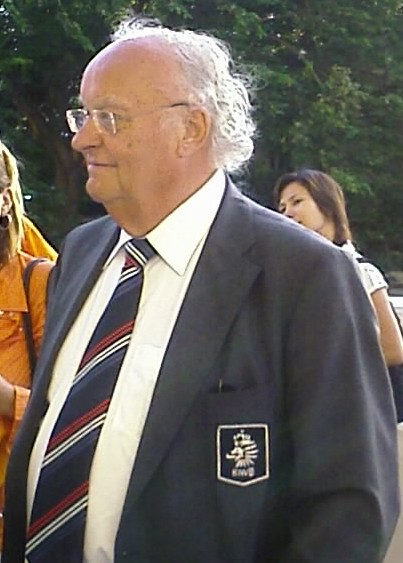
Jeu Sprengers

Mathieu Gerardus Marie "Jeu" Sprengers (24 May 1938, Tegelen – 6 April 2008) was the Dutch chairman of the Royal Dutch Football Association (KNVB) from 2002 until 2008. Sprengers served as chairman until his death on 6 April 2008, at the age of 69.
