= Chris Quinn =

American basketball player and coach

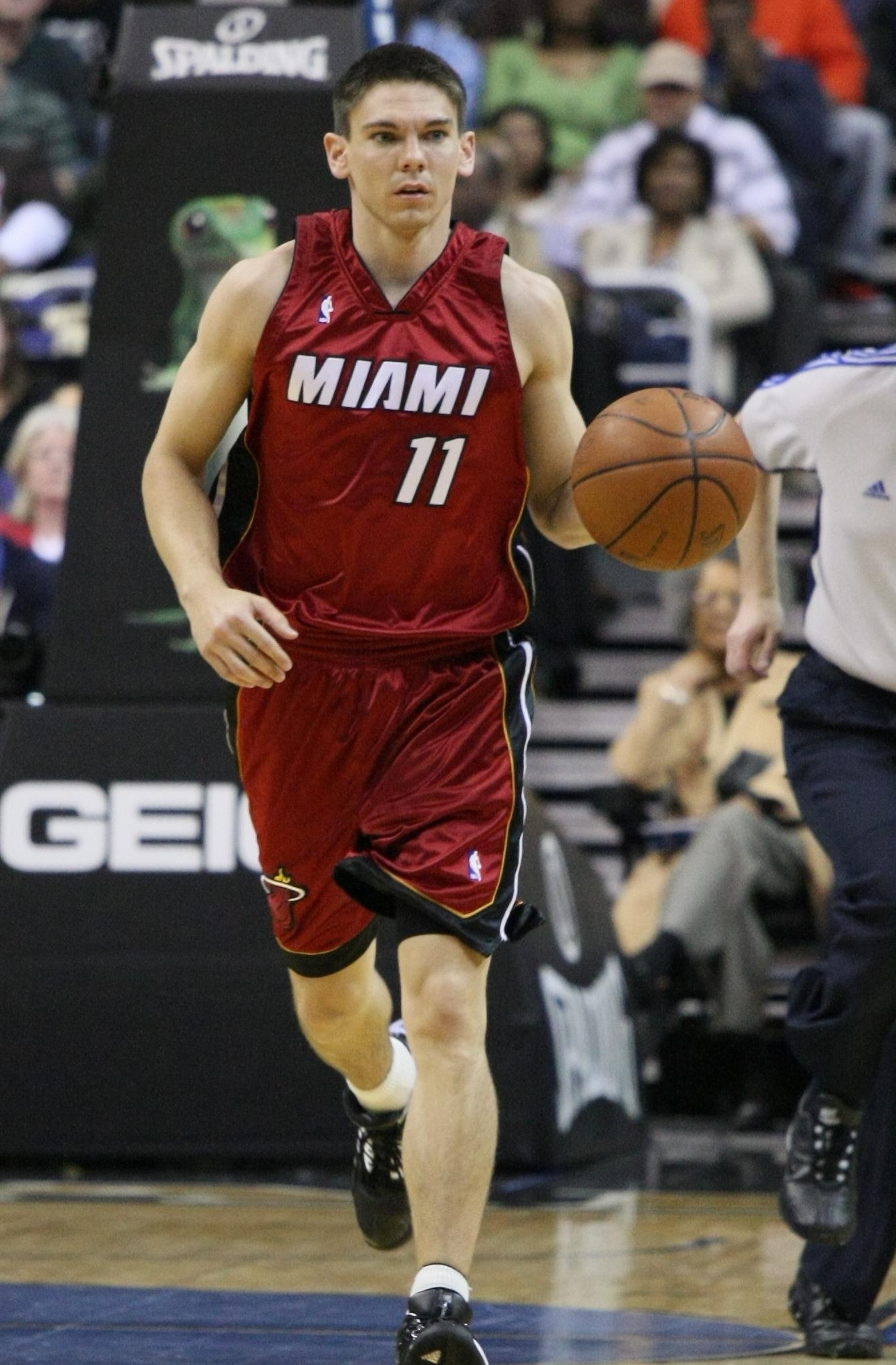
- Quinn with the Miami Heat in 2009

Miami Heat
- Title: Associate head coach
- League: NBA

Personal information
- Born: September 27, 1983 (age 43) New Orleans, Louisiana, U.S.
- Listed height: 6 ft 2 in (1.88 m)
- Listed weight: 175 lb (79 kg)

Career information
- High school: Dublin Coffman (Dublin, Ohio)
- College: Notre Dame (2002–2006)
- NBA draft: 2006: undrafted
- Playing career: 2006–2013
- Position: Point guard
- Number: 11, 1, 20
- Coaching career: 2013–present

Career history

Playing
- 2006–2010: Miami Heat
- 2010: New Jersey Nets
- 2010–2011: San Antonio Spurs
- 2011–2012: Khimki
- 2012: Valencia
- 2012–2013: Tulsa 66ers
- 2013: Cleveland Cavaliers

Coaching
- 2013–2014: Northwestern (assistant)
- 2014–2015: Sioux Falls Skyforce (assistant)
- 2014–2024: Miami Heat (assistant)
- 2024–present: Miami Heat (associate HC)

Career highlights
- First-team All-Big East (2006)
- Stats at NBA.com
- Stats at Basketball Reference

Christopher James Quinn Jr. (born September 27, 1983) is an American professional basketball coach and former player who is the top assistant coach for the Miami Heat of the National Basketball Association (NBA).

== High school ==
Quinn played his high school basketball at Dublin Coffman High School in Dublin, Ohio, where he set 14 school records and was named Columbus Dispatch Player of the Year in 2002. He was also twice named first-team all-state and was runner-up for Mr. Basketball honors in Ohio as a senior finishing behind NBA star LeBron James. Having also been named the Ohio Capital Conference Player of the Year, Quinn led his team to back-to-back conference championships, as well as two straight district championships.

== College career ==
At the University of Notre Dame, Quinn was a three-year starter and two-time co-captain. He finished his career averaging 14.6 points, 3.5 assists, 2.7 rebounds and 1.27 steals per game. As a senior, he led the team in scoring (17.7 ppg), assists (6.4 apg) and was tied for first in steals (1.55 spg), while shooting 42 percent from three-point range. Quinn was a First Team All-Big East selection as a senior and also was a Big East Academic All-Star selection as a freshman.

== Professional career ==
Having not been selected in the 2006 NBA draft, Quinn signed a partially guaranteed contract with the Miami Heat, and played for the team in the Orlando Summer League. Quinn made the team, and during his first season, he played in 42 games. In a February 5 bout against the Charlotte Bobcats, Quinn started his first ever game for the Heat, filling in for a suspended Gary Payton, and scored 14 points. He also dished 9 assists in an April 16 match against the Boston Celtics. During that first season, Quinn showed competent ballhandling skills and shooting touch, although he was left out off the Heat's playoff roster.

In 2007–08, with Payton's retirement and constant injuries to Dwyane Wade and Smush Parker, Quinn garnered more playing time, especially before the February trade that brought Marcus Banks from the Phoenix Suns. He scored a season-high 22 points against the Washington Wizards on December 13, connecting six three-point field goals.

Quinn scored a career high 26 points against the Detroit Pistons on April 15, 2009, on 9-of-13 shooting. He scored 19 of the Heat's last 30 points in the game.

On January 5, 2010, Quinn was traded along with a 2012 second round draft pick and cash to the New Jersey Nets for a conditional second-round pick in 2010 NBA draft.

In October 2010, Quinn joined the Philadelphia 76ers for training camp, but he was waived. He was signed by the San Antonio Spurs in November 2010.

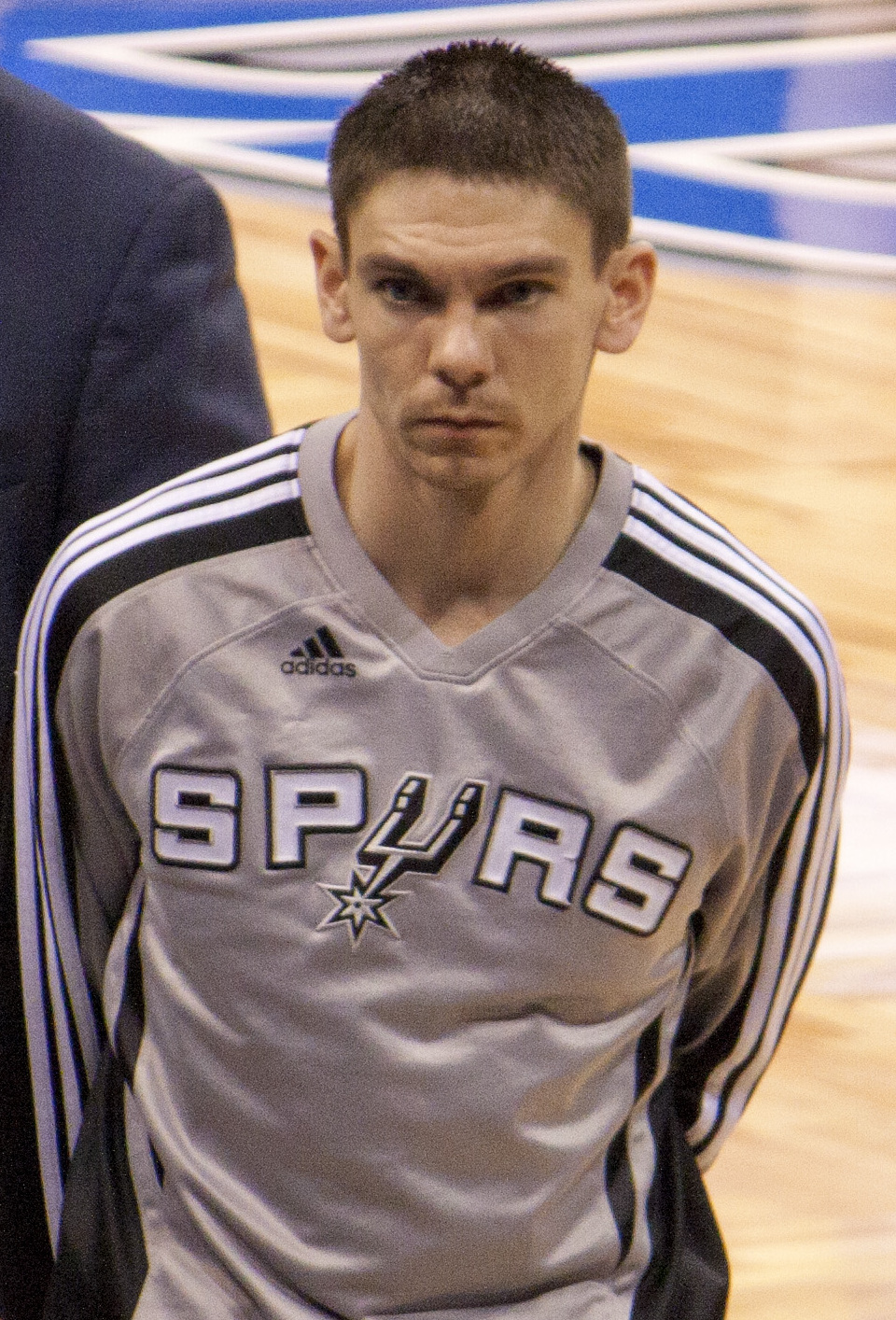
Quinn with the San Antonio Spurs in 2010

On July 21, 2011, he joined the VTB United League club Khimki Moscow Region. In November 2012, he joined the Spanish League club Valencia. He then signed with the NBA D-League's Tulsa 66ers on December 28, 2012.

On March 20, 2013, Quinn was signed by the Cleveland Cavaliers for the rest of the 2012–13 NBA season.

On July 19, 2013, he was waived by the Cavaliers.

== Coaching career ==
On October 28, 2013, Quinn was hired by Northwestern coach Chris Collins to serve as the team's new director of player development.

On September 17, 2014, Quinn was hired as an assistant coach by the NBA team that originally signed him as a player, the Miami Heat.

On March 26, 2022, Heat head coach Erik Spoelstra missed a regular season game against the Brooklyn Nets, which was announced only hours before the game. Quinn filled in on short notice. He said he would follow Spoelstra's coaching style: "I’m not rewriting the book by any means. We have a system and culture in place." It was the first time Quinn ever exercised the duties of the head coach. Team captain Udonis Haslem said of Quinn, "When you listen to Quinny, you’re hearing Spo. It’s the same message." Haslem added, "He has the knowledge, the experience, the relationship with the players. He has every base covered when you talk about checking the boxes to have the ability to be a successful head coach.”

On April 3, 2022, Spoelstra entered team health and safety protocols. Quinn once again served as substitute head coach for the Heat, which was Kyle Lowry's first game against his previous team, the Toronto Raptors. It was Quinn's first win as a head coach, and the first time an acting head coach won a game when Spoelstra was absent. Quinn posted a 2–1 overall record as acting head coach in 2021–22.

During Quinn's time in Miami, the team has finished .500 or above in 8 out of 10 seasons. The Heat have made two trips to the NBA Finals (2020 and 2023) and made another appearance in the Eastern Conference Finals in the 2022 Playoffs.

Over the past few offseasons, Quinn has garnered interest around the league and interviewed for multiple head coach openings. In ESPN's annual article that identifies the next potential NBA head coaches, Quinn was described and profiled as, "a point guard's point guard who has excelled at every task en route to the lead assistant's chair in Miami. Ask Heat insiders who most embodies the team's culture, and Quinn is commonly the answer (one league source affectionately referred to Quinn as Spoelstra's "mini-me" for his temperament and organizational skills). He's an emotionally stable leader who inspires confidence in players, as revealed when he filled in for Spoelstra as head coach for a stint in March and April. Quinn received his first interview for a head-coach job with Indiana in 2020, while Washington gave him a look in 2021."

== NBA career statistics ==
Legend
| GP | Games played | GS | Games started | MPG | Minutes per game |
| FG% | Field goal percentage | 3P% | 3-point field goal percentage | FT% | Free throw percentage |
| RPG | Rebounds per game | APG | Assists per game | SPG | Steals per game |
| BPG | Blocks per game | PPG | Points per game | **Bold** | Career high |

=== Regular season ===
| Year | Team | GP | GS | MPG | FG% | 3P% | FT% | RPG | APG | SPG | BPG | PPG |
|---|---|---|---|---|---|---|---|---|---|---|---|---|
| 2006–07 | Miami | 42 | 1 | 9.7 | .366 | .351 | .676 | .7 | 1.5 | .4 | .0 | 3.4 |
| 2007–08 | Miami | 60 | **25** | **22.3** | **.424** | .403 | .867 | **2.0** | **3.0** | **.8** | **.1** | **7.8** |
| 2008–09 | Miami | **66** | 0 | 14.6 | .408 | **.409** | .810 | 1.1 | 2.0 | .4 | .0 | 5.1 |
| 2009–10 | New Jersey | 25 | 0 | 8.9 | .357 | .313 | **1.000** | .6 | 1.2 | .4 | .0 | 2.2 |
| 2010–11 | San Antonio | 41 | 0 | 7.1 | .363 | .297 | .500 | .6 | 1.0 | .1 | .0 | 2.0 |
| 2012–13 | Cleveland | 7 | 0 | 11.1 | .250 | .000 | **1.000** | .3 | 1.3 | .4 | .0 | 1.4 |
| Career | | 241 | 26 | 13.7 | .399 | .377 | .809 | 1.1 | 1.9 | .4 | .0 | 4.5 |

=== Playoffs ===
| Year | Team | GP | GS | MPG | FG% | 3P% | FT% | RPG | APG | SPG | BPG | PPG |
|---|---|---|---|---|---|---|---|---|---|---|---|---|
| 2009 | Miami | 5 | 0 | 4.8 | .429 | .000 | 1.000 | .2 | 1.0 | .4 | .0 | 1.6 |
| Career | | 5 | 0 | 4.8 | .429 | .000 | 1.000 | .2 | 1.0 | .4 | .0 | 1.6 |
