= 2007–08 Miami Heat season =

NBA professional basketball team season

- Head coach: Pat Riley
- President: Pat Riley
- General manager: Randy Pfund
- Owner: Micky Arison
- Arena: American Airlines Arena

Results
- Record: 15–67 (.183)
- Place: Division: 5th (Southeast); Conference: 15th (Eastern)
- Playoff finish: Did not qualify
- Stats at Basketball Reference

Local media
- Television: FSN Florida, Sun Sports
- Radio: WIOD

The 2007–08 Miami Heat season was their 20th season in the National Basketball Association (NBA). To commemorate the anniversary, the Heat jerseys bear a XX on the rightmost part. However, the season turned out to be disastrous. Only two seasons removed from winning a championship, the Heat never recovered from winning only eight games in the first two months of the season and finished 15–67, the worst record in the league. Coincidentally, this was the same record the team posted in their inaugural season.

This was Pat Riley's final season as head coach of the Heat. He did, however, remain as team president and was replaced as head coach by Erik Spoelstra the following season.

It was also Alonzo Mourning's & Penny Hardaway’s final season in the NBA as Alonzo had suffered a season-ending and a possibly career-ending knee injury in a December game in Atlanta. After sitting out half of next season, Mourning retired in January. After his retirement, Mourning stayed with the Heat as an executive.

At mid-season in February, Shaquille O'Neal was traded to the Phoenix Suns for Shawn Marion and Marcus Banks. Before the trade, the Heat acquired Penny Hardaway, who was O'Neal's teammate with the Orlando Magic from 1993 until 1996. This move reunited the duo. However, Hardaway was waived after a few games with the team and he would never play in the NBA again and officially announced his retirement from basketball after 16 seasons.

Dwyane Wade, after recovering from off-season shoulder and knee surgeries, battled knee injuries and missed the final 21 games of the season after undergoing OssaTron treatment on his left knee. Wade recovered in time to play in the 2008 Summer Olympics.

== Key dates ==
Key dates prior to the start of the season:

- The 2007 NBA draft took place in New York City on June 28.
- The free agency period began in July.

== Draft picks ==
Miami's selections from the 2007 NBA draft in New York City.

Round	Pick	Player	Position	Nationality	School/Club team
1	20	Jason Smith (traded to Philadelphia)	Forward	United States	Colorado State
2	39	Stanko Barać (traded to Indiana)	Center	Croatia	Široki Brijeg (Adriatic League)

== Roster ==
2007–08 Miami Heat roster
Players

Pos.	No.	Player	Height	Weight	DOB	From
PG	6	Blake Ahearn	6 ft 2 in (1.88 m)	190 lb (86 kg)	1984-05-27	Southwestern Missouri State
C	50	Joel Anthony	6 ft 9 in (2.06 m)	260 lb (118 kg)	1982-08-09	UNLV
G	5	Marcus Banks	6 ft 2 in (1.88 m)	200 lb (91 kg)	1981-11-19	UNLV
C	30	Earl Barron	7 ft 0 in (2.13 m)	245 lb (111 kg)	1981-08-14	Memphis
C	15	Mark Blount	7 ft 0 in (2.13 m)	250 lb (113 kg)	1975-11-30	Pittsburgh
G/F	14	Daequan Cook	6 ft 5 in (1.96 m)	205 lb (93 kg)	1987-04-28	Ohio State
G/F	31	Ricky Davis	6 ft 7 in (2.01 m)	226 lb (103 kg)	1979-09-23	Iowa
PF	40	Udonis Haslem	6 ft 8 in (2.03 m)	235 lb (107 kg)	1980-06-09	Florida
F	13	Alexander Johnson	6 ft 9 in (2.06 m)	240 lb (109 kg)	1983-02-08	Florida State
F	45	Stephane Lasme	6 ft 8 in (2.03 m)	215 lb (98 kg)	1982-12-17	UMass
F	7	Shawn Marion	6 ft 7 in (2.01 m)	228 lb (103 kg)	1978-05-07	UNLV
C	33	Alonzo Mourning	6 ft 10 in (2.08 m)	261 lb (118 kg)	1970-02-08	Georgetown
F	12	Kasib Powell	6 ft 7 in (2.01 m)	215 lb (98 kg)	1981-03-18	Texas Tech
PG	11	Chris Quinn	6 ft 2 in (1.88 m)	185 lb (84 kg)	1983-09-27	Notre Dame
SG	3	Dwyane Wade	6 ft 4 in (1.93 m)	212 lb (96 kg)	1982-01-17	Marquette
PG	55	Jason Williams	6 ft 1 in (1.85 m)	180 lb (82 kg)	1975-11-18	Florida
G/F	1	Dorell Wright	6 ft 8 in (2.03 m)	205 lb (93 kg)	1985-12-02	Leuzinger HS (CA)

Coaches
Head coach
- Pat Riley
Assistant(s)
- Keith Askins
- Bill Foran
- Bob McAdoo
- Ron Rothstein
- Erik Spoelstra

Legend
- (DP) Unsigned draft pick
- (FA) Free agent
- (S) Suspended
- Injured

Roster
Updated: March 22, 2008

== Standings ==
Southeast Division	W	L	PCT	GB	Home	Road	Div
y-Orlando Magic	52	30	.634	–	25–16	27–14	12–4
x-Washington Wizards	43	39	.500	9	25–16	18–23	10–6
x-Atlanta Hawks	37	45	.451	15	25–16	12–29	9–7
Charlotte Bobcats	32	50	.390	20	21–20	11–30	7–9
Miami Heat	15	67	.183	37	9–32	6–35	2–14

=== Game log ===
==== November ====
Record: 4–11; Home: 2–6; Road: 2–5

#	Date	Visitor	Score	Home	OT	Leading scorer	Attendance	Record
1	November 1	Detroit	91–80	Miami	NO	Ricky Davis (23)	19,600	0–1
2	November 2	Miami	85–87	Indiana	NO	Daequan Cook (17)	12,887	0–2
3	November 4	Charlotte	90–88	Miami	NO	Udonis Haslem (18)	19,600	0–3
4	November 7	Miami	78–88	San Antonio	NO	Shaquille O'Neal (17)	17,503	0–4
5	November 9	Phoenix	106–101	Miami	NO	Shaquille O'Neal (25)	19,600	0–5
6	November 11	Miami	75–72	New York	NO	Udonis Haslem (16)	19,763	1–5
7	November 13	Miami	76–91	Charlotte	NO	Shaquille O'Neal (17)	12,169	1–6
8	November 14	Seattle	104–95	Miami	NO	Ricky Davis (19)	19,600	1–7
9	November 16	Miami	91–92	Boston	NO	Dwyane Wade (23)	18,624	1–8
10	November 17	Miami	91–87	New Jersey	NO	Dwyane Wade (23)	16,797	2–8
11	November 21	Atlanta	82–79	Miami	NO	Shaquille O'Neal (18)	19,600	2–9
12	November 23	Houston	91–98	Miami	NO	Dwyane Wade (31)	19,600	3–9
13	November 24	Miami	99–120	Orlando	NO	Dwyane Wade (32)	17,519	3–10
14	November 27	Charlotte	90–110	Miami	NO	Ricky Davis (23)	19,600	4–10
15	November 30	Boston	95–85	Miami	NO	Jason Williams (22)	19,600	4–11

==== December ====
Record: 4–12; Home: 2–4; Road: 2–8

#	Date	Visitor	Score	Home	OT	Leading scorer	Attendance	Record
16	December 2	Miami	89–115	Denver	NO	Dwyane Wade (13)	16,386	4–12
17	December 3	Miami	101–110	Utah	NO	Dwyane Wade (26)	19,911	4–13
18	December 6	Miami	106–112	Portland	NO	Dwyane Wade (21)	19,980	4–14
19	December 7	Miami	113–120	Golden State	NO	Dwyane Wade (33)	19,596	4–15
20	December 9	Miami	100–94	L.A. Clippers	NO	Dwyane Wade (33)	16,335	5–15
21	December 10	Miami	117–113	Phoenix	NO	Dwyane Wade (31)	18,422	6–15
22	December 13	Washington	104–91	Miami	NO	Chris Quinn (22)	19,600	6–16
23	December 15	Indiana	106–103	Miami	NO	U. Haslem, D. Wade (24)	19,600	6–17
24	December 17	Minnesota	87–91	Miami	NO	Dwyane Wade (30)	19,600	7–17
25	December 19	Miami	111–114	Atlanta	YES	Dwyane Wade (36)	17,069	7–18
26	December 20	New Jersey	107–103	Miami	YES	Dwyane Wade (41)	19,600	7–19
27	December 22	Utah	102–104	Miami	NO	Dwyane Wade (20)	19,600	8–19
28	December 25	Miami	82–96	Cleveland	NO	Dwyane Wade (22)	20,562	8–20
29	December 26	Miami	85–96	Philadelphia	NO	Dwyane Wade (27)	18,431	8–21
30	December 28	Orlando	114–121	Miami	YES	Dwyane Wade (48)	19,805	8–22
31	December 29	Miami	74–96	Washington	NO	Ricky Davis (22)	20,173	8–23

==== January ====
Record: 1–13; Home: 1–7; Road: 0–6

#	Date	Visitor	Score	Home	OT	Leading scorer	Attendance	Record
32	January 2	Milwaukee	98–103	Miami	NO	Dwyane Wade (27)	19,600	8–24
33	January 4	Miami	89–94	Dallas	NO	R. Davis, M. Blount (17)	20,357	8–25
34	January 6	Miami	94–101	Memphis	NO	Ricky Davis (24)	14,581	8–26
35	January 8	Miami	91–101	Minnesota	NO	Dwyane Wade (25)	13,111	8–27
36	January 9	Miami	92–98	Milwaukee	NO	Dwyane Wade (34)	15,834	8–28
37	January 11	Miami	88–114	New Orleans	NO	Mark Blount (27)	16,133	8–29
38	January 16	Chicago	96–126	Miami	NO	D. Wade, S. O'Neal (24)	19,600	8–30
39	January 18	Portland	91–98	Miami	NO	Dwyane Wade (37)	19,600	8–31
40	January 19	New York	84–88	Miami	NO	Dwyane Wade (22)	19,600	8–32
41	January 21	Cleveland	90–97	Miami	NO	Dwyane Wade (42)	19,600	8–33
42	January 24	San Antonio	89–90	Miami	NO	Dwyane Wade (27)	19,600	8–34
43	January 26	Indiana	98–96	Miami	NO	Dwyane Wade (35)	19,600	9–34
44	January 29	Boston	87–117	Miami	NO	Mark Blount (20)	19,600	9–35
45	January 30	Miami	91–107	Orlando	NO	Ricky Davis (21)	17,519	9–36

==== February ====
Record: 2–10; Home: 1–5; Road: 1–5

#	Date	Visitor	Score	Home	OT	Leading scorer	Attendance	Record
46	February 1	New Jersey	85–94	Miami	NO	Dwyane Wade (15)	19,600	9–37
47	February 4	Toronto	82–114	Miami	NO	Dorell Wright (17)	19,600	9–38
48	February 6	Miami	95–100	Detroit	NO	Dwyane Wade (30)	22,076	9–39
49	February 7	Miami	84–101	Philadelphia	NO	Dwyane Wade (19)	14,103	9–40
50	February 10	L.A. Lakers	94–104	Miami	NO	Mark Blount (22)	19,600	9–41
51	February 12	Denver	113–114	Miami	NO	Dwyane Wade (27)	19,600	9–42
52	February 14	Miami	92–99	Chicago	NO	Dwyane Wade (30)	21,792	9–43
53	February 21	Miami	100–112	Houston	NO	Dwyane Wade (33)	15,994	9–44
54	February 23	Philadelphia	101-96	Miami	YES	Dwyane Wade (33)	19,600	9–45
55	February 26	Sacramento	107–86	Miami	NO	Shawn Marion (24)	19,243	10–45
56	February 28	Miami	88–106	L.A. Lakers	NO	Dwyane Wade (18)	18,997	10–46
57	February 29	Miami	103–93	Seattle	NO	Dwyane Wade (31)	12,542	11–46

==== March ====
Record: 2–15; Home: 1–7; Road: 1–8

#	Date	Visitor	Score	Home	OT	Leading scorer	Attendance	Record
58	March 2	Miami	109–120	Sacramento	NO	Dwyane Wade (26)	15,028	11–47
59	March 5	Toronto	108–83	Miami	NO	Marcus Banks (21)	19,143	11–48
60	March 7	Golden State	99–134	Miami	NO	C. Quinn, M. Banks (20)	19,161	11–49
61	March 8	Miami	94–97	Atlanta	NO	Ricky Davis (27)	17,022	11–50
62	March 10	L.A Clippers	99–98	Miami	NO	Ricky Davis (27)	19,014	11–51
63	March 12	New York	91–88	Miami	NO	Ricky Davis (27)	19,103	11–52
64	March 14	Orlando	103–94	Miami	NO	Jason Williams (34)	19,312	11–53
65	March 16	Dallas	98–73	Miami	NO	Earl Barron (21)	19,304	11–54
66	March 18	Miami	112–106	Milwaukee	NO	Jason Williams (21)	13,379	12–54
67	March 19	Miami	54–96	Toronto	NO	Chris Quinn (14)	19,800	12–55
68	March 21	Washington	103–86	Miami	NO	Bobby Jones (15)	19,345	12–56
69	March 22	Miami	82–94	Charlotte	NO	Jason Williams (19)	17,522	12–57
70	March 24	Milwaukee	73–78	Miami	NO	Chris Quinn (24)	19,024	13–57
71	March 26	Miami	96–103	New York	YES	Ricky Davis (28)	19,209	13–58
72	March 27	Miami	69–85	Detroit	NO	Blake Ahearn (15)	22,076	13–59
73	March 30	Miami	62–88	Boston	NO	C. Quinn, R. Davis (14)	18,624	13–60
74	March 31	Miami	85–105	Indiana	NO	Daequan Cook (16)	11,529	13–61

==== April ====
Record: 2–6; Home: 2–3; Road: 0–3

#	Date	Visitor	Score	Home	OT	Leading scorer	Attendance	Record
75	April 2	New Orleans	106–77	Miami	NO	Chris Quinn (18)	19,122	13–62
76	April 4	Miami	99–105	Washington	NO	Ricky Davis (33)	18,875	13–63
77	April 6	Detroit	91–75	Miami	NO	Earl Barron (20)	19,141	13–64
78	April 8	Chicago	88–95	Miami	NO	Kasib Powell (18)	19,175	14–64
79	April 11	Memphis	96–91	Miami	NO	Earl Barron (22)	19,017	14–65
80	April 13	Miami	76–84	Cleveland	NO	Ricky Davis (17)	20,562	14–66
81	April 14	Miami	75–91	Toronto	NO	Daequan Cook (22)	18,855	14–67
82	April 16	Atlanta	99–113	Miami	NO	Jason Williams (17)	19,073	15–67

- Green background indicates win.
- Red background indicates loss.

== Player statistics ==
=== Ragular season ===
Player	POS	GP	GS	MP	REB	AST	STL	BLK	PTS	MPG	RPG	APG	SPG	BPG	PPG
Ricky Davis	SF	82	47	2,963	353	276	87	14	1,130	36.1	4.3	3.4	1.1	.2	13.8
Mark Blount	C	69	46	1,542	263	41	33	34	581	22.3	3.8	.6	.5	.5	8.4
Jason Williams	PG	67	53	1,886	130	307	83	5	588	28.1	1.9	4.6	1.2	.1	8.8
Chris Quinn	PG	60	25	1,340	118	178	46	4	465	22.3	2.0	3.0	.8	.1	7.8
Daequan Cook	SG	59	19	1,441	177	75	23	9	518	24.4	3.0	1.3	.4	.2	8.8
Dwyane Wade	SG	51	49	1,954	214	354	87	37	1,254	38.3	4.2	6.9	1.7	.7	24.6
Udonis Haslem	PF	49	48	1,805	443	68	39	18	589	36.8	9.0	1.4	.8	.4	12.0
Earl Barron	C	46	15	889	198	29	19	8	326	19.3	4.3	.6	.4	.2	7.1
Dorell Wright	SF	44	34	1,104	220	60	29	41	347	25.1	5.0	1.4	.7	.9	7.9
Alexander Johnson	PF	43	6	549	94	13	13	10	179	12.8	2.2	.3	.3	.2	4.2
Shaquille O'Neal^{†}	C	33	33	945	258	45	19	54	470	28.6	7.8	1.4	.6	1.6	14.2
Alonzo Mourning	C	25	0	389	93	7	4	42	149	15.6	3.7	.3	.2	1.7	6.0
Joel Anthony	PF	24	1	498	93	3	9	31	85	20.8	3.9	.1	.4	1.3	3.5
Shawn Marion^{†}	PF	16	15	602	179	40	30	15	229	37.6	11.2	2.5	1.9	.9	14.3
Penny Hardaway	SF	16	8	325	35	35	19	1	60	20.3	2.2	2.2	1.2	.1	3.8
Stéphane Lasme^{†}	PF	15	4	303	53	3	13	22	83	20.2	3.5	.2	.9	1.5	5.5
Luke Jackson	SF	14	1	228	33	17	8	0	79	16.3	2.4	1.2	.6	.0	5.6
Marcus Banks^{†}	PG	12	2	259	25	36	6	5	114	21.6	2.1	3.0	.5	.4	9.5
Blake Ahearn	PG	12	0	177	19	19	6	0	70	14.8	1.6	1.6	.5	.0	5.8
Kasib Powell	SF	11	4	304	44	18	9	2	84	27.6	4.0	1.6	.8	.2	7.6
Smush Parker^{†}	PG	9	0	183	19	15	5	3	43	20.3	2.1	1.7	.6	.3	4.8
Bobby Jones^{†}	SF	6	0	143	24	5	2	0	48	23.8	4.0	.8	.3	.0	8.0

- ^{†} Denotes player spent time with another team in the season. Stats reflect time with the Heat only.

== Transactions ==
The Heat have been involved in the following transactions during the 2007–08 season.

=== Trades ===
October 24, 2007	To Miami Heat Ricky Davis & Mark Blount	To Minnesota Timberwolves Antoine Walker, Wayne Simien, Michael Doleac & Miami's conditional 1st round pick.
February 6, 2008	To Miami Heat Shawn Marion & Marcus Banks	To Phoenix Suns Shaquille O'Neal

=== Subtractions ===
Marcus Slaughter-Power forward/center, signed a two-year contract with Miami in June 2007, but was released October 29, 2007.

=== Free agents ===
Player	Former team
Smush Parker	L.A. Lakers

Player	New team
Gary Payton	unsigned
James Posey	Boston Celtics
Jason Kapono	Toronto Raptors
Eddie Jones	Dallas Mavericks

== See also ==
- 2007–08 NBA season
