= Dwyane Wade =

American basketball player (born 1982)

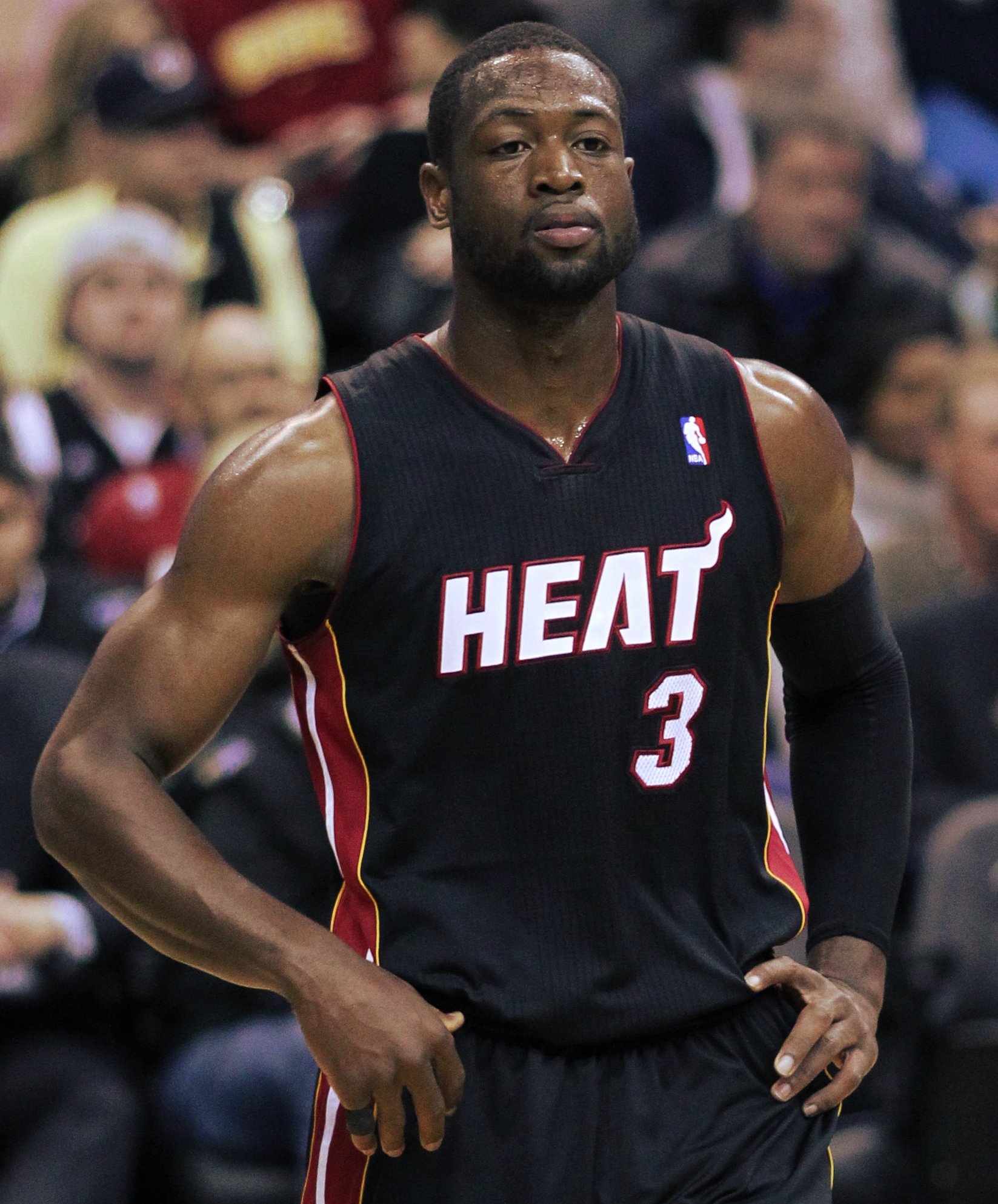
- Wade with the Miami Heat in 2011

Utah Jazz
- Title: Co-owner
- League: NBA

Personal information
- Born: January 17, 1982 (age 44) Chicago, Illinois, U.S.
- Listed height: 6 ft 4 in (1.93 m)
- Listed weight: 220 lb (100 kg)

Career information
- High school: Harold L. Richards (Oak Lawn, Illinois)
- College: Marquette (2001–2003)
- NBA draft: 2003: 1st round, 5th overall pick
- Drafted by: Miami Heat
- Playing career: 2003–2019
- Position: Shooting guard
- Number: 3, 9

Career history
- 2003–2016: Miami Heat
- 2016–2017: Chicago Bulls
- 2017–2018: Cleveland Cavaliers
- 2018–2019: Miami Heat

Career highlights
- 3× NBA champion (2006, 2012, 2013); NBA Finals MVP (2006); 13× NBA All-Star (2005–2016, 2019); NBA All-Star Game MVP (2010); 2× All-NBA First Team (2009, 2010); 3× All-NBA Second Team (2005, 2006, 2011); 3× All-NBA Third Team (2007, 2012, 2013); 3× NBA All-Defensive Second Team (2005, 2009, 2010); NBA scoring champion (2009); NBA All-Rookie First Team (2004); NBA 75th Anniversary Team; No. 3 retired by Miami Heat; Sports Illustrated Sportsman of the Year (2006); Consensus first-team All-American (2003); Third-team All-American – SN (2002); Conference USA Player of the Year (2003); 2× First-team All-Conference USA (2002, 2003); No. 3 retired by Marquette Golden Eagles

Career statistics
- Points: 23,165 (22.0 ppg)
- Rebounds: 4,933 (4.7 rpg)
- Assists: 5,701 (5.4 apg)
- Stats at NBA.com
- Stats at Basketball Reference
- Basketball Hall of Fame
Medals
Men's basketball
Representing the United States
Olympic Games
Gold medal – first place	2008 Beijing	Team competition
Bronze medal – third place	2004 Athens	Team competition
World Cup
Bronze medal – third place	2006 Japan	Team competition

Dwyane Tyrone Wade Jr. (/dweɪn/ DWAYN or /duˈwaɪeɪn/ doo-WY-ayn, born January 17, 1982) is an American basketball executive and former professional player who is a co-owner of the Utah Jazz of the National Basketball Association (NBA). He is also currently the host of the American adaptation of The Cube. Nicknamed "D-Wade" and "Flash", he is widely regarded as one of the greatest shooting guards in NBA history. Wade spent the majority of his 16-year career playing for the Miami Heat of the National Basketball Association (NBA) and won three NBA championships, was a 13-time NBA All-Star, an eight-time member of the All-NBA Team, and a three-time member of the All-Defensive Team. Wade is also Miami's all-time leader in points, games played, assists, steals, shots made, and shots taken.

After a successful college basketball career with the Marquette Golden Eagles, including leading the team to the Final Four in 2003, Wade was drafted fifth overall in the 2003 NBA draft by the Heat. In his third season, Wade led the Heat to their first NBA Championship and was named the 2006 NBA Finals MVP. At the 2008 Summer Olympics, he led the United States men's basketball team, commonly known as the "Redeem Team", in scoring and helped them capture the gold medal. In the 2008–09 season, Wade led the league in both total points (2,386) and points per game (30.2), the latter stat earning him his lone NBA scoring title. Wade was selected as the NBA All-Star Game MVP in 2010. With LeBron James and Chris Bosh, he helped guide Miami to four consecutive NBA Finals from 2011 to 2014, and won back-to-back championships in 2012 and 2013. In July 2016, Wade briefly left Miami to play for the Chicago Bulls and the Cleveland Cavaliers for a season and a half before being traded back to Miami in February 2018 where he finished his playing career and retired in 2019. The Heat retired Wade's #3 jersey in 2020. He purchased a minority ownership stake in the Utah Jazz in 2021 and became a minority stakeholder of the WNBA's Chicago Sky in 2023. In October 2021, Wade was honored as one of the league's greatest players of all time by being named to the NBA 75th Anniversary Team. He has been inducted into the Naismith Memorial Basketball Hall of Fame twice: in 2023 for his individual career, and in 2025 as a member of the Redeem Team.

== Early life ==
Wade was born the second of two children to JoLinda and Dwyane Wade Sr. in Chicago, Illinois, on January 17, 1982. Wade attributes the erroneous spelling of his and his father's first name to his grandmother. JoLinda already had two children when she married Wade's father, and with him she had Dwyane and his older sister Tragil. The pair separated when Wade was four months old. He described his early childhood in the South Side of Chicago as "trying".

When his parents got divorced, JoLinda was given custody of Wade and his sister. JoLinda struggled with drug addiction and often committed crimes that sent her to prison. At eight years old, Tragil tricked Dwyane into thinking they were going to the movie theater, only to take him to live with his father and stepmother. Wade visited his mother on occasion until his father moved the family to Robbins, Illinois, after which Wade would not see her for two years.

Wade turned to basketball and football, avoiding the temptations of drugs and gangs. Wade credited Tragil as the person most responsible for pointing him in the right direction. Wade grew up idolizing Michael Jordan and modeled his game after him. On October 14, 2001, as Wade's basketball career blossomed, JoLinda vowed to turn her life around. She says that she has not used drugs since 2003.

== High school career ==
Wade played basketball and football for Harold L. Richards High School in Oak Lawn. He immediately excelled as a wide receiver and also played as a backup quarterback, but success in basketball took longer. Wade grew four inches by the start of his junior year and emerged as the team leader, averaging 20.7 points and 7.6 rebounds.

Wade's improvement continued into his senior year, when he averaged 27 points and 11 rebounds. Wade led the Bulldogs to a 24–5 record and to a Class AA Eisenhower Sectional appearance. He set school records for points scored (676) and steals made (106). Wade credited coach Jack Fitzgerald as a seminal and positive influence. Wade was recruited to play basketball only by Marquette, Illinois State, and DePaul due to low ACT scores.

== College career ==
Wade committed to Marquette University in Milwaukee, Wisconsin to play under coach Tom Crean. In his freshman year, Wade was sidelined by NCAA Proposition 48, which set academic eligibility requirements for participation in Division I sports. Effort and tutoring sufficiently raised his academic standing so that Wade became eligible by the start of his sophomore year. Wade chose to wear the jersey number 3, due to the Holy Trinity, and as a tribute to Allen Iverson, who Wade described as a hero of culture. He would continue to wear this jersey while on the Heat.

=== 2001–02 season ===
Wade led the Marquette Golden Eagles in scoring with 17.8 points (ppg) and led Conference USA in both steals per game with 2.47 and two-point field goals made with 205; he averaged 6.6 rebounds and 3.4 assists. Marquette finished with a 26–7 record, their best since the 1993–94 season.

=== 2002–03 season ===
Wade again led the school in scoring with 21.5 points and the Golden Eagles finished with a 27–6 record. Three days after JoLinda was released from prison, she saw Wade play basketball for the first time in five years as Marquette upset the Cincinnati Bearcats, 70–61, to capture the Conference USA title on March 8, 2003. He helped bring the Golden Eagles to the Final Four for the first time since their 1977 national championship season. Wade was subsequently named to the All-America First Team by the Associated Press (AP), making him the first basketball player from Marquette to receive the distinction since 1978.

Wade's performance during the Midwest Regional final drew national attention. Against a top-seeded Kentucky team, he delivered 29 points, 11 rebounds, and 11 assists, including a memorable breakaway dunk, as Marquette upset the Wildcats, 83–69, and advanced to the Final Four for the first time since 1977. Wade's triple double was the fourth ever recorded in NCAA tournament history. The Golden Eagles finished their season as No. 6 in the AP Poll, Marquette's highest ranking since 1976–77. Wade was named the MVP of the Midwest Regional. His performance earned him a high NBA draft projection. As a result, Wade skipped his senior year to enter the 2003 NBA draft.

Marquette retired Wade's No. 3 jersey on February 3, 2007. It ordinarily requires student-athletes to have graduated for jersey retirement, but made an exception for Wade.

== Professional career ==
=== Miami Heat (2003–2016) ===
==== Rookie year (2003–04) ====
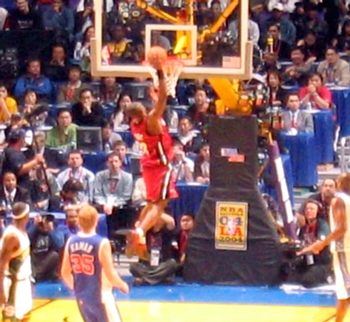
Wade dunking the ball during the 2004 Rookie Challenge game for the Rookies team

Selected fifth in the 2003 NBA draft by the Miami Heat, Wade became the highest ranked of only four Marquette first round draft picks. He quickly emerged as a productive player, averaging 16.2 points on 46.5% shooting as well as 4.0 rebounds and 4.5 assists. After a 5–15 start, the Heat gradually improved to finish 42–40 and qualify for the playoffs. Wade served up outstanding postseason performances, particularly against the Indiana Pacers during the Eastern Conference Semifinals. Wade earned a unanimous selection to the 2004 NBA All-Rookie Team and finished third in Rookie of the Year voting (after LeBron James and Carmelo Anthony). He placed among the top five rookies in several statistical categories, including second in field goal percentage, second in steals, third in scoring, fourth in assists, and fourth in minutes played.

In the first playoff game, Wade hit a running jumper with 1.3 seconds left in the final quarter to give the Heat an 81–79 victory over the New Orleans Hornets. Winning that series 4–3, the Heat faced the Pacers, who were the top-seeded team with the best record in the NBA. The Heat lost the series 4–2. Wade became only the fourth rookie in the shot clock era to lead his team in points and assists during the postseason.

==== Breakthrough year (2004–05) ====
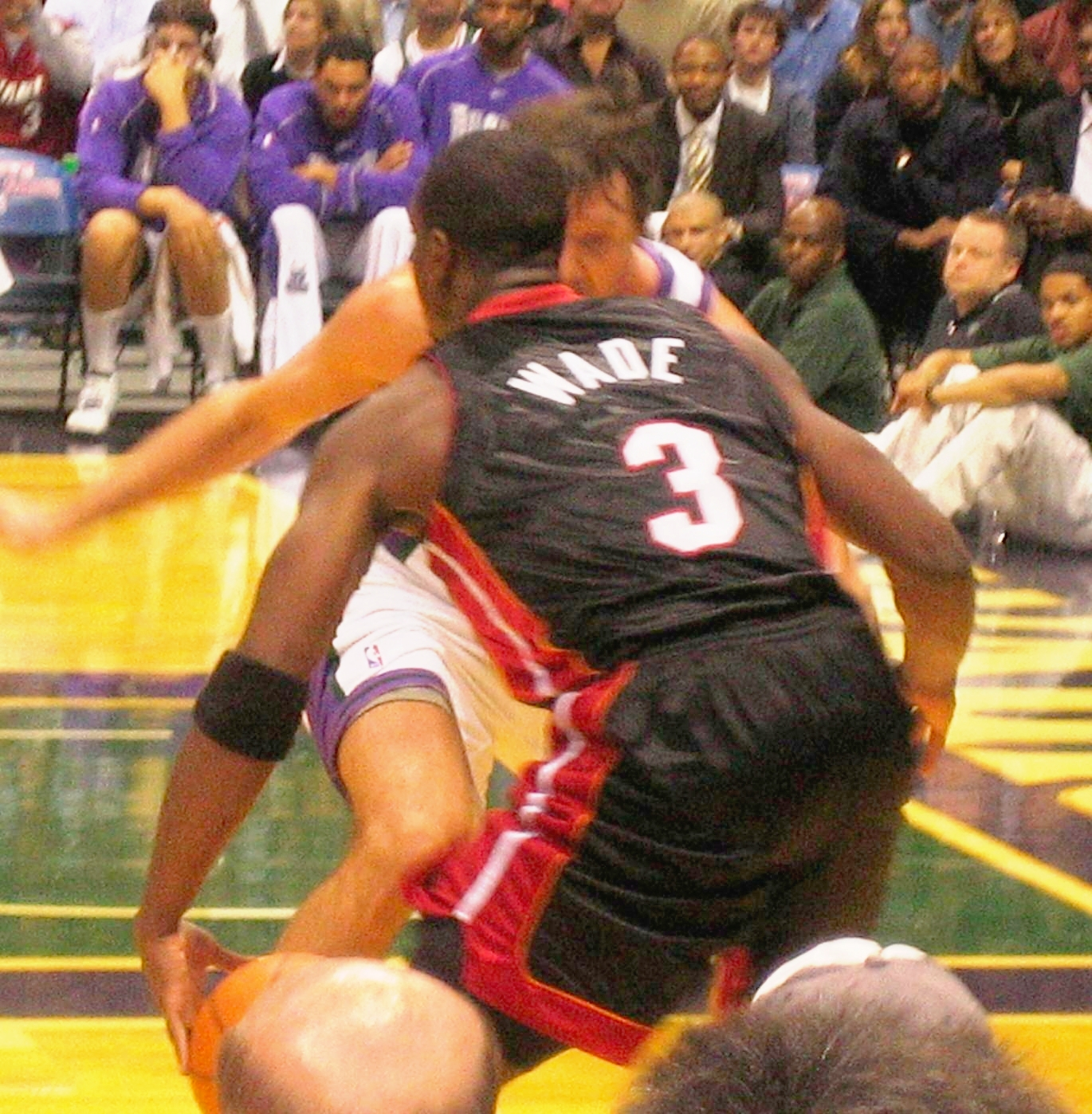
Wade with the ball against the Milwaukee Bucks in 2005

The Heat traded with the Los Angeles Lakers for center Shaquille O'Neal. Improving on their previous season's 42–40 record by 17 games, Miami went 59–23, leading the Eastern Conference. Wade earned a reserve slot in the season's All-Star Game; adding 14 points in 24 minutes of play.

In the first round of the 2005 playoffs, Wade averaged 26.3 points, 8.8 assists, and 6 rebounds a night while maintaining a 50% field-goal percentage as the Heat swept the New Jersey Nets. In the second round, he averaged 31 points, seven rebounds, and eight assists per game as the Heat swept the Washington Wizards. The Heat lost the Eastern Conference Finals 4–3 to the Detroit Pistons, the previous season's champions. Wade scored 42 points in Game 2 and 36 points in Game 3 despite playing with sinusitis, the flu, and a knee strain. He suffered a strained rib muscle in Game 5 that prevented him from playing in the sixth game and limited him in the seventh.

==== NBA champion and Finals MVP (2005–06) ====
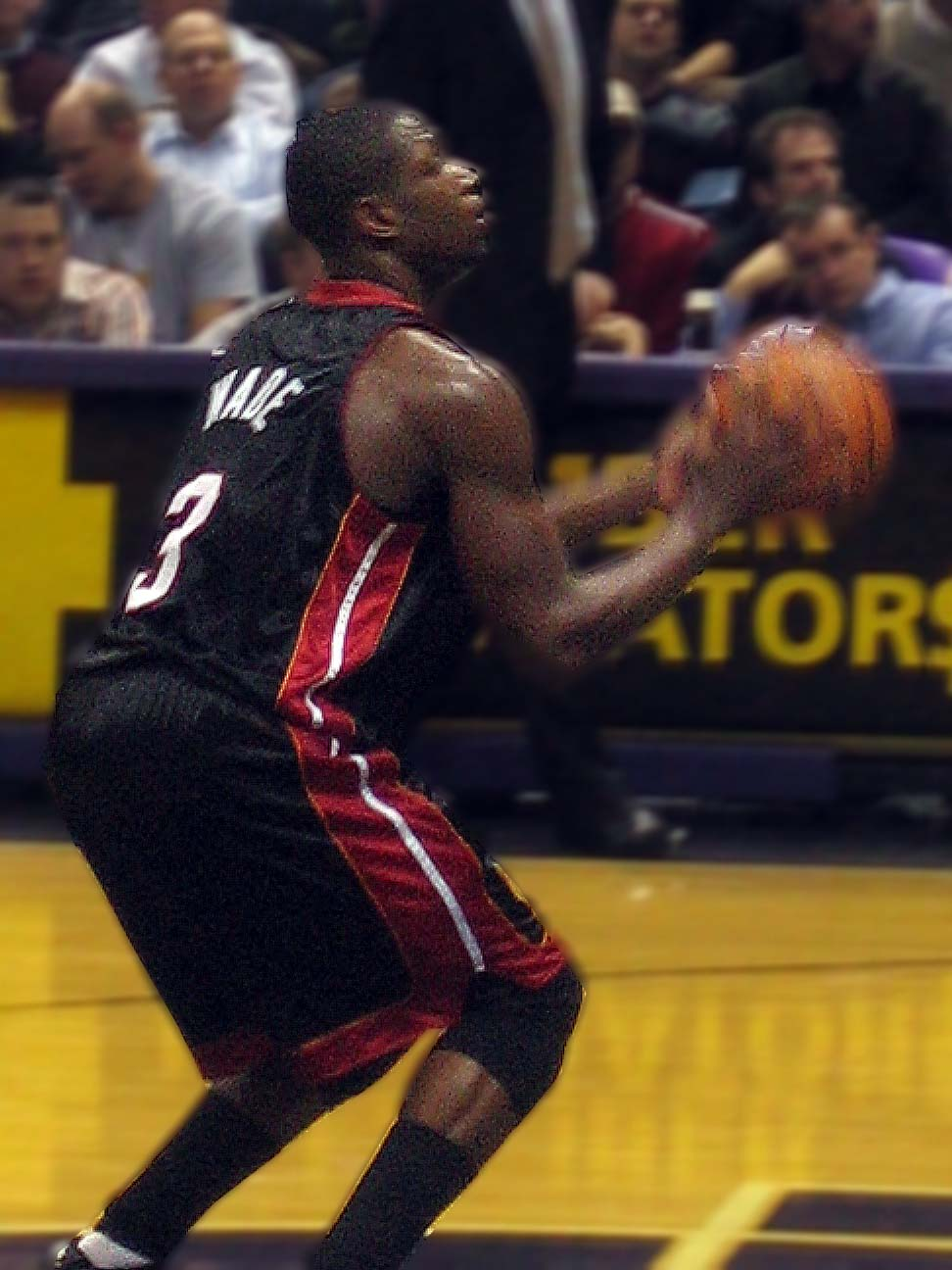
Wade at the free throw line

In the 2005–06 season, Wade was elected to the All-Star Game as a starter. During 30 minutes of play, he put up 20 points on 9-of-11 field goals. Wade finished the regular season averaging 27.2 points, 6.7 assists, 5.7 rebounds, and 1.95 steals.

In the first round of the 2006 playoffs, Miami played the Chicago Bulls. Wade incurred several injuries, including a severely bruised hip during Game 5. He scored 15 of his 28 points while suffering intense pain, to give the Heat a 3–2 series lead. Wade led the Heat past the Detroit Pistons despite experiencing flu-like symptoms in Game 6. In the series-clinching contest, he landed 14 points and 10 assists.

During the 2006 NBA Finals, Miami faced the Dallas Mavericks. Wade's 42, 36, and 43 points in Games 3, 4, and 5, respectively, helped the Heat go from a 0–2 deficit to a 3–2 series lead. In Game 3, Wade's 42 points tied his playoff-high and his 13 rebounds were a career-high. The Heat took Game 6 behind Wade's 36 points, taking the series 4–2, earning Wade the Finals MVP trophy. He became the fifth-youngest player in NBA history to capture the Finals MVP award, and his 34.7 points were the Finals' third-highest among players in their first NBA Finals. His 33.8 player efficiency rating (PER) over the NBA Finals was ranked by John Hollinger of ESPN as the best since the NBA-ABA merger.

==== Injuries and missing playoffs (2006–2008) ====
Following the title win, Wade signed a three-year, $63 million contract that carried a player option to add an additional fourth year. In the 2006–07 season, Wade missed 31 games due to injury; even so, he was elected to his third consecutive All-Star Game and received All-NBA honors. Wade became the first guard to earn All-NBA honors after missing 31 or more games since Pete Maravich. The Heat struggled with injuries in general and were 20–25 on February 1, 2007. Playing the Houston Rockets on February 21, 2007, Wade dislocated his left shoulder and left the court in a wheelchair. Wade chose to delay surgery and instead rehabilitate his shoulder in time for the postseason. After missing 23 games, Wade returned to the active roster. Sporting a black shoulder sleeve, Wade played 27 minutes and notched 12 points and 8 assists in the 111–103 overtime loss. For the season, Wade averaged 27.4 points, 7.5 assists, 4.7 rebounds, and 2.1 steals, while shooting 50% from the field; further, he finished the season as the NBA PER leader.

During the 2007 playoffs, Wade averaged 23.5 points, 6.3 assists, and 4.8 rebounds per contest, but were swept in the first round by the Chicago Bulls. Post-playoffs, Wade underwent a pair of surgeries to repair his dislocated left shoulder and left knee, both of which proved successful. However, the knee ailment, commonly called "jumper's knee", prevented Wade from joining USA Basketball in the Olympic Qualifying Tournament over that summer.

After missing the Tournament of Americas' Olympic Qualifiers as well as the preseason and the first seven games, Wade began the 2007–08 season on November 14, 2007. Despite battling pain in his injured knee throughout the season, Wade was elected to his fourth consecutive All-Star Game appearance. However, the Heat held the worst record in the NBA. Wade's knee problems led Riley to sit Wade for the final 21 games to undergo long overdue OssaTron treatment. Wade averaged 24.6 points, 6.9 assists, 4.2 rebounds, and 1.7 steals.

==== Scoring champion and playoff defeats (2008–2010) ====
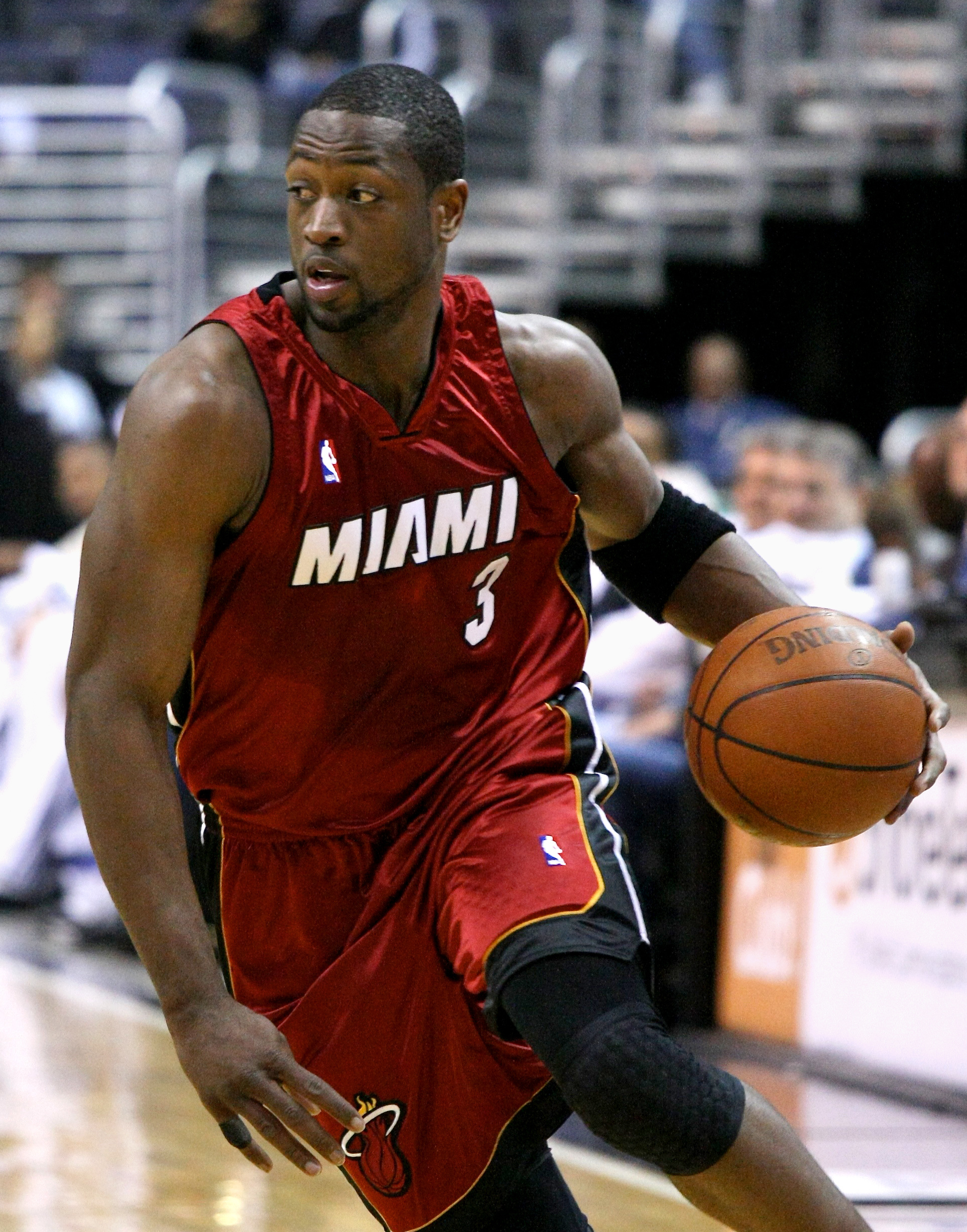
Wade dribbling the ball in 2009

After months of rehab, he helped the U.S. National Team win gold at the 2008 Olympics, leading the team in scoring. Wade returned to the starting lineup to begin the 2008–09 campaign. Early that season, Wade became the second player in NBA history to post at least 40 points, 10 assists, and five blocks in a single game since Alvan Adams in 1976–77. Wade was elected to his fifth consecutive All-Star Game.

After the All-Star break, Wade recorded 50 points on 56.6% shooting along with 5 rebounds and 5 assists during a blow-out loss to the Orlando Magic; making him the fourth in NBA history to score at least 50 points in a game that his team lost by at least 20. In the next game, Wade recorded a career-high 16 assists and added 31 points and seven rebounds. Wade became the second player to record 15 or more assists after scoring 50-plus points since Wilt Chamberlain. Two games later, Wade tied a franchise record, scoring 24 points in the final quarter to secure a 120–115 win over the New York Knicks. For the game, Wade recorded 46 points on 55% field goal shooting, plus 10 assists, eight rebounds, four steals, and three blocked shots. In the next game, he scored 40 points against the Cleveland Cavaliers. Wade put up 41 points on 53% shooting along with 9 assists, seven steals, seven rebounds, and a block in the 107–100 loss. The following game, Wade tied his career-high with 16 assists and added 35 points on 62% shooting, six rebounds, plus a steal and a block, as the Heat beat the Phoenix Suns 135–129. Wade became the only player in Heat history to have multiple games with 30-plus points and 15 or more assists. Less than a week later, Wade hit the buzzer-beater and tied his earlier franchise record with his 78th straight double-digit scoring game in double-overtime against the Chicago Bulls. Wade finished the game with 48 points on 71.4% shooting, 12 assists, six rebounds, four steals, and three blocks in 50 minutes of play. Wade joined Chamberlain as the only players in NBA history to record that many points and that many assists in a single game while having as high of a field goal percentage. Two games later, Wade surpassed Alonzo Mourning to become the Heat's all-time leading scorer in triple overtime versus the Utah Jazz. Wade finished that 140–129 victory with 50 points to go along with his 10 rebounds, nine assists, four steals, and two blocks.

Wade became the only player to reach 2,000 points, 500 assists, 150 steals, and 100 blocks as well as the only player under 6 feet 5 inches (1.96 m) to block upwards of 100 shots in a single season. He became the fifth player to accumulate 2,000 points, 500 assists, and 150 steals in a season. Wade helped the Heat clinch a playoff berth and become only the second team to make the postseason after winning 15 or fewer games the season before. In a 122–105 victory over the New York Knicks, Wade recorded a career-high 55 points on 63% field goal shooting and added nine rebounds and four assists. Wade recorded 50 points in only three quarters and was pulled out of the game, one point shy of eclipsing Glen Rice's 56-point franchise record. Wade averaged a league-leading 30.2 points for his first NBA scoring title. He added 7.5 assists, 5 rebounds, 2.2 steals, and 1.3 blocks. Wade wrapped up the season with higher point, assist, steal, and block averages than James and Kobe Bryant, both of whom finished ahead of Wade in the MVP race.

On November 1, in what was only his third game of the 2009–10 season, Wade recorded his 10,000th career point during a 95–87 victory over the Chicago Bulls. On November 12 against the Cleveland Cavaliers, Wade made a spectacular dunk over Anderson Varejão. Although the Heat lost by a score of 111–104, LeBron James regarded the dunk as "great, probably top 10 all-time." The next day against the New Jersey Nets, Wade hit another buzzer beater for a one-point win at 81–80. On January 6, Wade scored a season-high 44 points during a 112–106 overtime loss to the Boston Celtics, the most in a losing effort that season. Wade appeared in the 2010 NBA All-Star Game. Wade was named the game's MVP with 28 points, 11 assists, six rebounds, and five steals.

On February 17, Wade strained his calf. He left the game, ending his personal and the Heat's franchise-record streak of 148 consecutive games with at least 10 points. Wade was named Eastern Conference Player of the Month for the fifth time and Player of the Week twice for his play in the month of March. He averaged 26.9 and 7.5 assists, both of which ranked third in the Eastern Conference, and 2.3 steals per game, which ranked first. Wade recorded six 30-point games and had six double-doubles in the month, including a season-high 14 assists.

For the season, Wade averaged 26.6 points on 47.6% field goal shooting to go with 6.5 assists, 4.8 rebounds, 1.8 steals and 1.1 blocks; doing so, he led his team to a 47–35 record and the fifth playoff seed. In the first round, down 0–3 against the Boston Celtics, Wade recorded a career playoff and franchise record with 46 points; he outscored the entire Celtics team in the fourth quarter. It was Wade's sixth career playoff game with at least 40 points. Despite his averaging 33.2 points on 56.4% shooting, 6.8 assists, 5.6 rebounds, 1.6 steals, and 1.6 blocks per contest, the Heat fell to Boston in five games.

==== Big Three era and back-to-back championships (2010–2014) ====
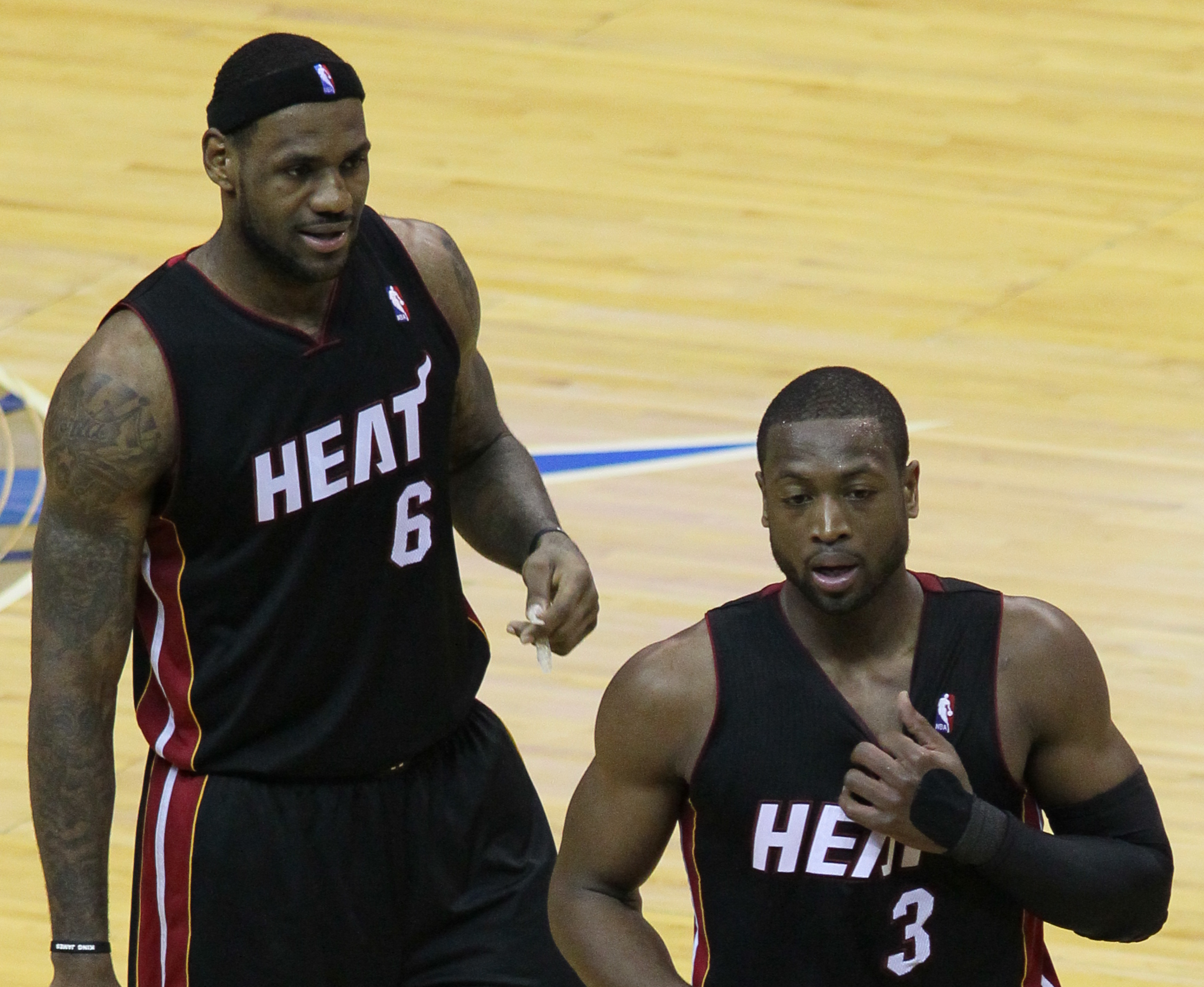
Wade (right) with LeBron James in 2010

During the off-season, the Miami-Dade County commission renamed the area "Miami-Wade County" from July 1 to 7, a week that coincided with the start of free agency, intended to help convince Wade to stay with the Heat. On July 7, it was announced that Wade would re-sign with Miami on a 6-year, $107.5 million contract, along with Toronto Raptors star Chris Bosh. The following day, LeBron James announced he would join the Heat.

In the first year of the Big Three Era, the Heat finished with a 58–24 record and earned the second seed in the Eastern Conference. Wade averaged 25.5 points, 6.4 rebounds, 4.6 assists, and 1.5 steals while shooting 50%. After defeating the Philadelphia 76ers, Boston Celtics, and Chicago Bulls, the Heat reached the NBA Finals but ultimately fell to the Dallas Mavericks in six games. Wade averaged 26.5 points, 7.0 rebounds, and 5.2 assists for the Finals and 24.5 points, 7.1 rebounds, and 4.4 assists for the playoffs.

On February 26, 2012, Wade recorded the third triple-double in the history of the All-Star Game, posting 24 points, 10 rebounds, and 10 assists, joining Jordan and James. On March 10, 2012, Wade made the game-winning shot against the Indiana Pacers, giving the Heat a 93–91 overtime victory. Wade finished the season averaging 22.1 points, 4.8 assists, 4.6 rebounds, and 1.7 steals. The Heat defeated the New York Knicks in 5 games and the Indiana Pacers in six games. In Game 6 of the second round, Wade recorded 41 points and 10 rebounds. The Heat prevailed in seven games in the Eastern Conference Finals. They beat the Oklahoma City Thunder in five games in the 2012 NBA Finals with Wade averaging 22.6 points. The Heat became the first team in NBA history to win a championship after trailing in three playoff series.

Before the start of the 2012–13 season, Wade underwent left knee surgery, missing the 2012 Summer Olympics. On December 26, 2012, playing the Charlotte Bobcats, Wade kicked guard Ramon Sessions in the groin. The following day, Wade was suspended by the NBA for one game. Wade finished the 2012–13 season with averages of 21.2 points, 5.0 rebounds and 5.1 assists.

In the playoffs, injuries limited Wade to a career-low scoring average of 15.9 points per game, but he upped his average to 19.6 points during the NBA Finals against the San Antonio Spurs. After the teams split the first two games in Miami, the Spurs took Game 3. In Game 4, Wade scored 32 points on 56 percent shooting to go along with six steals as the Heat won 109–93. The Spurs took Game 5 despite Wade's 25 points and 10 assists. Wade scored 14 points in Miami's overtime win in Game 6, followed by 23 points and 10 rebounds in Game 7 as the Heat clinched their second straight championship and Wade's third title.

In the 2013–14 season, Wade missed 28 games from injuries and the team's decision to rest him during "back-to-back" games. Wade averaged 19 points and posted a career-high 54% field goal percentage. In the playoffs, the team increased Wade's minutes, highlighted by a 28-point performance in Miami's second-round victory over the Brooklyn Nets and a 23-point outing in a road victory against Indiana in the Eastern Finals. The Heat won the series in six games, advancing to their fourth straight NBA Finals. Wade averaged 19.1 points on 52 percent shooting, his best playoff percentage since 2010. The Heat lost to the San Antonio Spurs in the 2014 NBA Finals in five games.

==== Post-Big Three era (2014–2016) ====
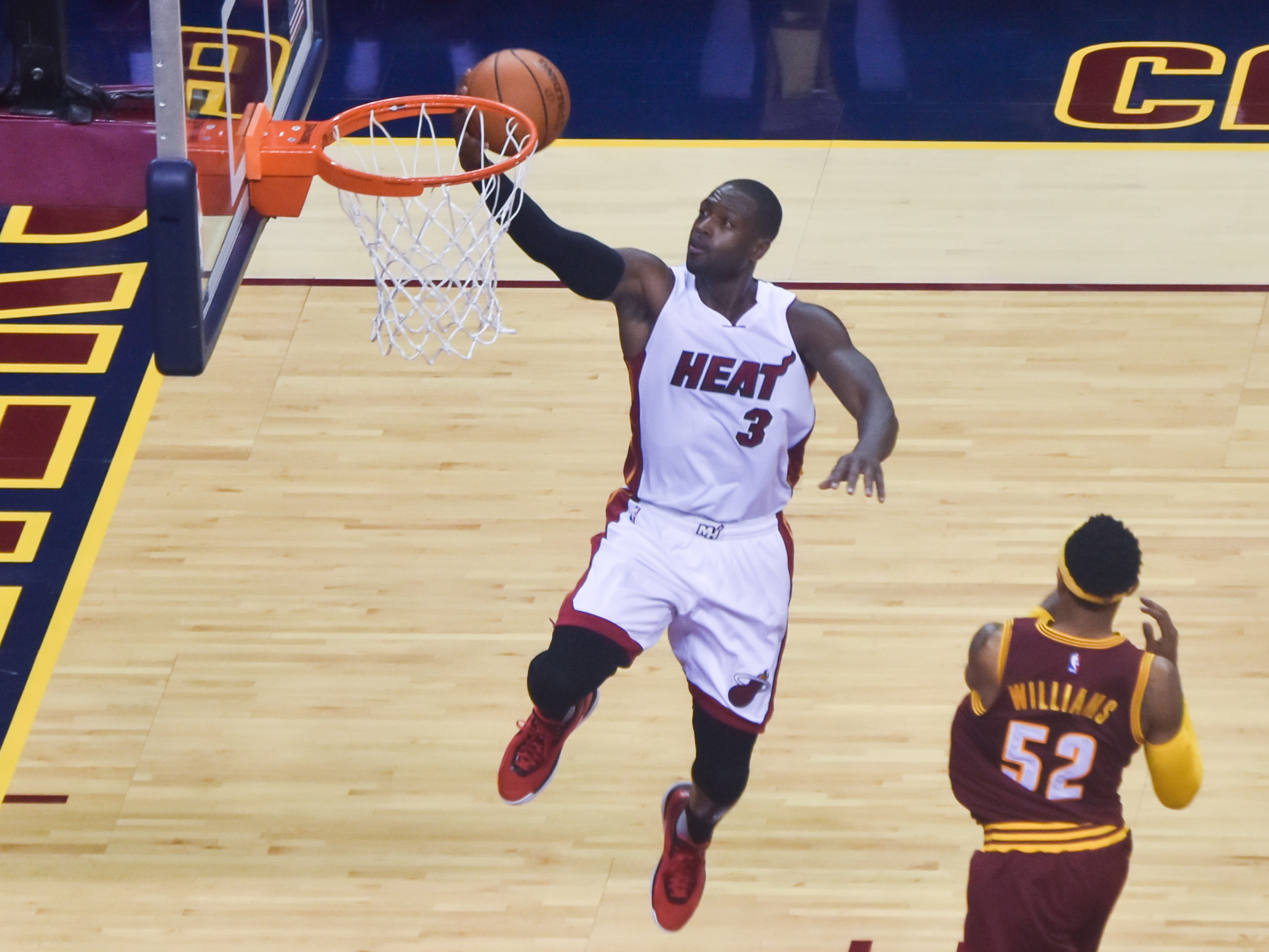
Wade making a lay-up in 2015

On June 28, 2014, Wade, James, and Bosh all opted out of their contracts in order to cut costs, but intended to re-sign. James then announced that he was returning to Cleveland. Wade and Bosh re-signed with the Heat with Wade signing a two-year, $34 million contract with the second year being a player option, which allowed the Heat to re-sign Udonis Haslem, Chris Andersen, and Mario Chalmers as well as bring in former rivals Danny Granger and Luol Deng.

In the 2014–15 season, Wade missed seven consecutive games due to a hamstring injury. On December 17 against the Utah Jazz, he scored a season-high 42 points, his highest total in almost four years, but Miami lost 105–87. Wade was again named an All-Star but pulled out due to another hamstring injury. The Heat finished the season with a 37–45 record, as Wade missed the postseason for just the second time in his career.

On June 29, 2015, Wade opted out of his contract, but then signed a one-year, $20 million contract. Wade hit just seven three-point shots during the 2015–16 regular season. However, in the 2016 postseason, Wade converted on his first seven three-point shot attempts. Wade had never made more than five three-pointers in a row.

=== Chicago Bulls (2016–2017) ===
In July 2016, Wade joined his hometown team, the Chicago Bulls, on a two-year deal worth approximately $47 million. Initially, the Heat offered him a two-year, $20 million contract, before increasing it to a two-year, $40 million offer, both of which Wade felt were unacceptable. On November 4, 2016, Wade scored a game-high 35 points and grabbed 10 rebounds during a 117–104 loss to the New York Knicks.

Wade teamed up with Jimmy Butler and Rajon Rondo in Chicago. In January 2017, the trio were all fined for criticizing their young teammates' effort. In March 2017, Wade sustained a fractured elbow but returned for the playoffs. However, the Bulls were defeated 4–2 by the Boston Celtics in the first round.

=== Cleveland Cavaliers (2017–2018) ===
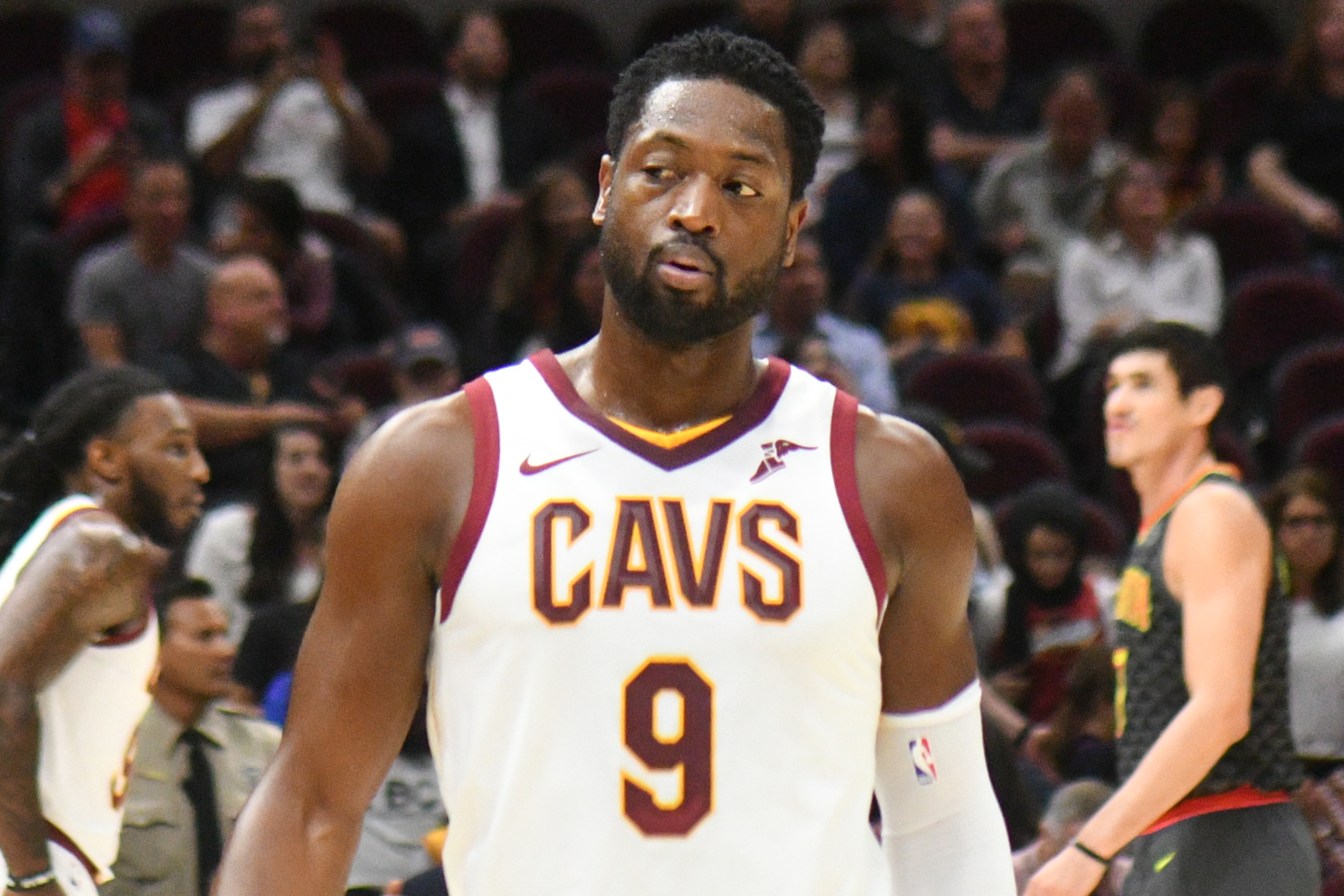
Wade in 2017

On September 24, 2017, three months after trading Butler and waiving Rondo, the Bulls reached an agreement on a buyout with Wade. Three days later, he signed with the Cleveland Cavaliers and reunited with former Miami Heat teammate LeBron James.

During the season, Wade objected to coach Tyronn Lue's plan to play him off the bench. Wade started for the Cavaliers in the first three games of the season, but shot only 7-for-25. After a 114–93 loss to the Orlando Magic during the third game, in which Wade scored only five points, he volunteered to take a bench role and became the leader of the second unit.

=== Return to Miami (2018–2019) ===
On February 8, 2018, at the NBA trade deadline, the Cavaliers overhauled their roster. Acquiring guards Jordan Clarkson, George Hill and Rodney Hood, the Cavaliers traded Wade back to the Miami Heat in exchange for a protected 2024 second-round draft pick. At the funeral of Wade's long-time agent Henry Thomas in January, Wade mended relations with Riley.

On February 9, in his first game back with the Heat, Wade was garnered a standing ovation and recorded three points, two rebounds, two assists, and two blocks off the bench in a 91–85 victory over the Milwaukee Bucks. On February 27, he scored a season-high 27 points and made the game-winning shot as the Heat rallied to beat the Philadelphia 76ers 102–101. On April 3, in a 101–98 victory over the Atlanta Hawks, Wade reached 5,000 assists in a Heat uniform, becoming the ninth player to score 20,000 points and collect 5,000 assists with one team, joining Karl Malone, Bryant, Jordan, James, Larry Bird, John Havlicek, Oscar Robertson and Jerry West. On April 16, Wade scored 28 points to end the 76ers' 17-game winning streak and lead the Heat to a 113–103 Game 2 win over Philadelphia and even the first-round playoff series. He passed Larry Bird for 10th on the NBA's career postseason scoring list.

In the offseason, Wade announced his intentions to retire after the 2018–19 season, re-signing with the Heat on September 18. Wade missed seven games in mid-November due to the birth of his daughter. On November 25, Wade scored a season-high 35 points in a 125–115 loss to the Toronto Raptors, setting a record for the most points scored by a Miami bench player. On December 9, he scored 25 points in his 1,000th career game as the Heat defeated the Los Angeles Clippers 121–98.

On January 6, 2019, Wade became the third player in NBA history to record at least 20,000 points, 5,000 assists, 4,000 rebounds, 1,500 steals, 800 blocks and 500 three-pointers. He was named by NBA Commissioner Adam Silver as a special roster addition for the 2019 All-Star game, thus marking his 13th All-Star appearance. Wade had received the second-most fan votes for guards in the Eastern Conference. On February 27, he recorded 25 points and made the game-winning three-pointer in a 126–125 victory over the Golden State Warriors. On April 9, Wade played his last home game in Miami, scoring 30 points in a 122–99 victory over the Philadelphia 76ers. In his final game against the Brooklyn Nets the following night, Wade recorded his fifth career triple-double with 25 points, 11 rebounds, and 10 assists as the Heat lost by a score of 113–94.

On January 7, 2020, the Heat announced that Wade's No. 3 jersey would be retired on February 22.

== Basketball executive career ==
During his playing career with Miami, Wade had discussed the potential for a future ownership stake in the Heat franchise. However, Wade was unable to commit at the time, according to Heat owner Micky Arison.

On April 16, 2021, it was announced that Wade had purchased an undisclosed minority ownership stake in the Utah Jazz franchise of the NBA, joining an ownership group led by his personal friend and associate, Ryan Smith, the Jazz majority owner and team governor. Wade is a member of a small ownership group that includes Smith, his wife Ashley, investor and Accel partner Ryan Sweeney, Atlassian co-founder Mike Cannon-Brookes and the Miller family, which previously owned the team.

"This goes way beyond the dream I had to just play basketball in the NBA. I've seen Shaq do it in Sacramento. I've seen Grant Hill do it in Atlanta. I've seen Jordan do it in Charlotte. If this partnership is going to be anything like my relationship is with Ryan, there are going to be a lot of things that I'll want to be involved in. [...] Unfortunately, people in my community don't get this opportunity, and I do not take it lightly to have this opportunity. To make real change, this is where you have to be – at the top – and Ryan knows that. I'm thankful for him, and I know too that I bring a lot to this partnership outside of just my basketball knowledge and skills.

— Dwyane Wade on purchasing an ownership stake in the Jazz

Wade said in the announcement of his purchase that he hoped to take a hands-on approach to his involvement, and highlighted his close brother-like relationship with Jazz star Donovan Mitchell, who he called the player most like him and "2.0".

On July 14, 2023, it was announced that Wade joined the ownership group of the WNBA franchise Chicago Sky as a minority stakeholder.

== National team career ==
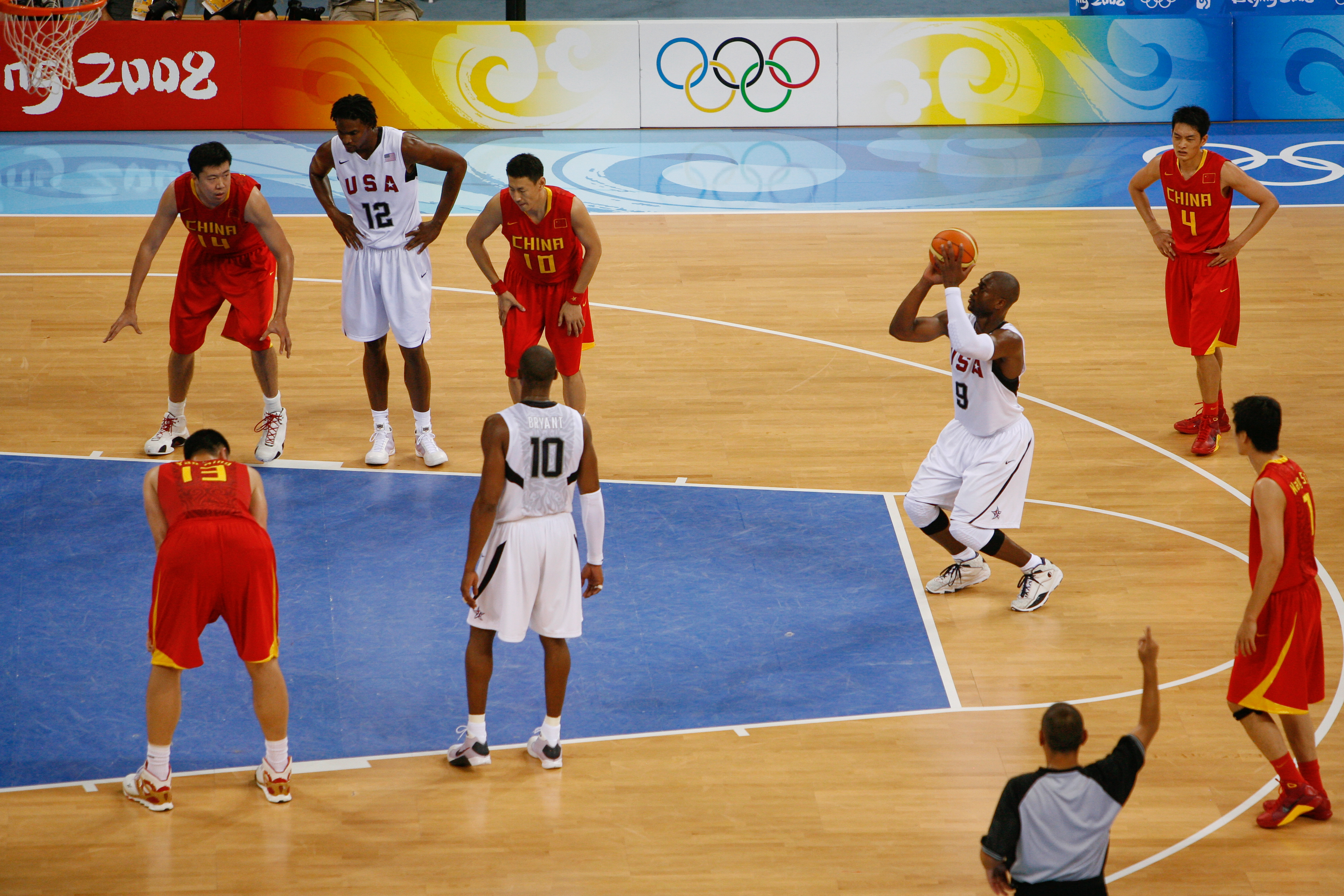
Wade shooting a free-throw against China during the 2008 Olympics

Wade was a member of the 2004 Olympic team, which won a bronze medal in Athens. The team competed in the 2006 FIBA World Championship in Japan, in which Wade averaged 19.3 points per game. The U.S. national team won a bronze medal. Wade was named to the national team roster from 2006 to 2008; and, together with James and Anthony, Wade co-captained the 2006 team.

At the 2008 Summer Olympics, the United States went undefeated and captured gold medal honors after beating Spain, the 2006 World champions. Wade, who led the team in scoring, tallied a game-high 27 points in 27 minutes on 75% field goal shooting and added four steals, two assists, and two rebounds. Wade averaged a team-high 16 points in 18 minutes on 67% field goal shooting, four rebounds, two assists, and 2.3 steals, as the U.S. lived up to their Redeem Team moniker and claimed gold medal honors for the first time since 2000.

== Player profile ==
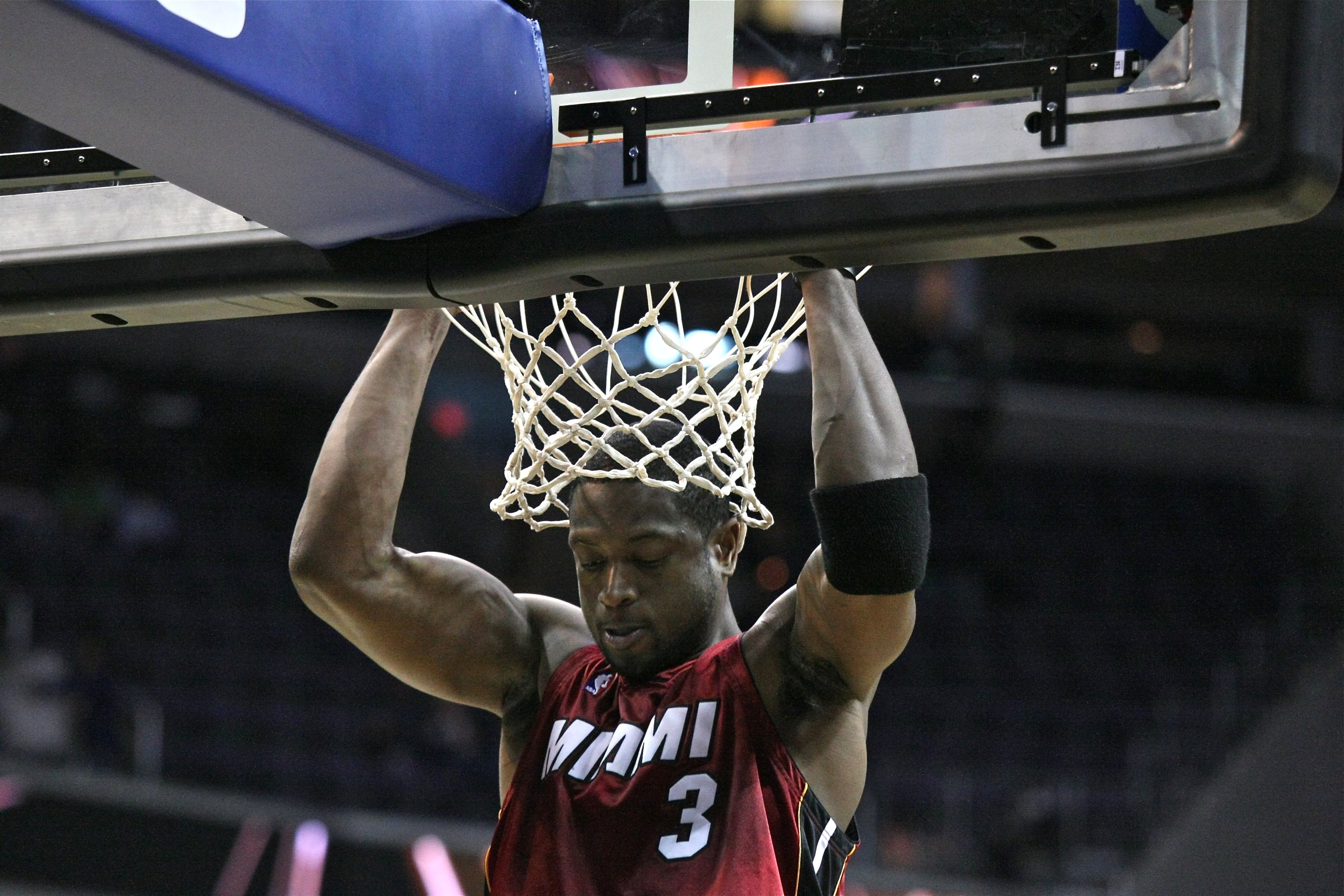
Wade's pre-game ritual consisted of doing pull-ups at the rim

Listed at 6 feet 4 inches (1.93 m) tall and weighing 220 pounds (100 kg), Wade was a shooting guard who could play point guard as he did during his rookie season and with smaller lineups. On offense, Wade was one of the quickest and most difficult players to guard, as well as one of the best slashers in NBA history. His signature one-two step allowed him to dash past bigger defenders and draw fouls. Wade ranked first in free-throw attempts per 48 minutes in 2004–05 and again in the 2006–07 season. He was an unselfish player, averaging 5.4 assists for his career. After winning the NBA Finals MVP Award in 2006, Wade developed a reputation as one of the league's premier clutch players.

David Thorpe, an athletic trainer who runs a training center for NBA players, cited Wade's post-up game as one of his strengths. Thorpe said that Wade's best moves from the post were his turnaround jump shot, double pivot, and what Thorpe termed a "freeze fake", a pump fake Wade used to get his opponent to jump, so that Wade could drive around him. Wade's main weakness was three-point shooting as he averaged only 29% for his career.

Wade was best known for being able to convert difficult lay-ups, even after hard mid-air collisions with larger defenders. His style drew concerns over the dangers of playing in this manner, as Wade had hurt his knees and wrists after mid-air collisions with larger players. Wade established himself on defense for his ability to block shots and accumulate steals. Wade holds the NBA record for blocks by players listed 6 feet 4 inches (1.93 m) and under, which he achieved in only 679 games; this is over 400 games less than the previous record-holder Dennis Johnson (1,100).

In 2022, to commemorate the NBA's 75th Anniversary The Athletic ranked their top 75 players of all time, and named Wade as the 28th greatest player in NBA history.

== Career statistics ==
Legend
GP	Games played	GS	Games started	MPG	Minutes per game
FG%	Field goal percentage	3P%	3-point field goal percentage	FT%	Free throw percentage
RPG	Rebounds per game	APG	Assists per game	SPG	Steals per game
BPG	Blocks per game	PPG	Points per game	**Bold**	Career high
†	Won an NBA championship	*	Led the league

=== NBA ===
==== Regular season ====
Year	Team	GP	GS	MPG	FG%	3P%	FT%	RPG	APG	SPG	BPG	PPG
2003–04	Miami	61	56	34.9	.465	.302	.747	4.0	4.5	1.4	.6	16.2
2004–05	Miami	77	77	**38.6**	.478	.289	.762	5.2	6.8	1.6	1.1	24.1
2005–06†	Miami	75	75	**38.6**	.495	.171	.783	5.7	6.7	1.9	.8	27.2
2006–07	Miami	51	50	37.9	.491	.266	**.807**	4.7	**7.5**	2.1	1.2	27.4
2007–08	Miami	51	49	38.3	.469	.286	.758	4.2	6.9	1.7	.7	24.6
2008–09	Miami	**79**	**79**	**38.6**	.491	.317	.765	5.0	**7.5**	**2.2**	**1.3**	**30.2***
2009–10	Miami	77	77	36.3	.476	.300	.761	4.8	6.5	1.8	1.1	26.6
2010–11	Miami	76	76	37.1	.500	.306	.758	**6.4**	4.6	1.5	1.1	25.5
2011–12†	Miami	49	49	33.2	.497	.268	.791	4.8	4.6	1.7	**1.3**	22.1
2012–13†	Miami	69	69	34.7	.521	.258	.725	5.0	5.1	1.9	.8	21.2
2013–14	Miami	54	53	32.9	**.545**	.281	.733	4.5	4.7	1.5	.5	19.0
2014–15	Miami	62	62	31.8	.470	.284	.768	3.5	4.8	1.2	.3	21.5
2015–16	Miami	74	73	30.5	.456	.159	.793	4.1	4.6	1.1	.6	19.0
2016–17	Chicago	60	59	29.9	.434	.310	.794	4.5	3.8	1.4	.7	18.3
2017–18	Cleveland	46	3	23.2	.455	.329	.701	3.9	3.5	.9	.7	11.2
2017–18	Miami	21	0	22.2	.409	.220	.745	3.4	3.1	.9	.7	12.0
2018–19	Miami	72	2	26.2	.433	**.330**	.708	4.0	4.2	.8	.5	15.0
Career		1,054	909	33.9	.480	.293	.765	4.7	5.4	1.5	.8	22.0
All-Star		12	10	23.8	.634	.250	.720	3.6	4.8	2.3	.4	15.7

==== Playoffs ====
Year	Team	GP	GS	MPG	FG%	3P%	FT%	RPG	APG	SPG	BPG	PPG
2004	Miami	13	13	39.2	.455	.375	.787	4.0	5.6	1.3	.3	18.0
2005	Miami	14	14	40.8	.484	.100	.799	5.7	6.6	1.6	1.1	27.4
2006†	Miami	**23**	**23**	41.7	.497	.378	.808	5.9	5.7	**2.2**	1.1	28.4
2007	Miami	4	4	40.5	.429	.000	.688	4.8	6.3	1.3	.5	23.5
2009	Miami	7	7	40.7	.439	.360	.862	5.0	5.3	.9	**1.6**	29.1
2010	Miami	5	5	**42.0**	**.564**	.405	.675	5.6	**6.8**	1.6	**1.6**	**33.2**
2011	Miami	21	21	39.4	.485	.269	.777	**7.1**	4.4	1.6	1.3	24.5
2012†	Miami	**23**	**23**	39.4	.462	.294	.729	5.2	4.3	1.7	1.3	22.8
2013†	Miami	22	22	35.5	.457	.250	.750	4.6	4.8	1.7	1.0	15.9
2014	Miami	20	20	34.7	.500	.375	.767	3.9	3.9	1.5	.3	17.8
2016	Miami	14	14	33.8	.469	**.522**	.781	5.6	4.3	.8	.9	21.4
2017	Chicago	6	6	31.7	.372	.353	**.952**	5.0	4.0	.8	1.3	15.0
2018	Miami	5	0	25.4	.443	.000	.808	4.2	3.6	1.4	.2	16.6
Career		177	172	37.8	.474	.338	.780	5.2	4.9	1.5	1.0	22.3

=== College ===
Year	Team	GP	GS	MPG	FG%	3P%	FT%	RPG	APG	SPG	BPG	PPG
2001–02	Marquette	32	32	29.2	.487	**.346**	.690	**6.6**	3.4	**2.5**	1.1	17.8
2002–03	Marquette	**33**	**33**	**32.1**	**.501**	.318	.779	6.3	**4.4**	2.2	**1.3**	**21.5**
Career		65	65	30.7	.494	.333	.745	6.5	3.9	2.3	1.2	19.7

== Awards and honors ==
NBA

- 3× NBA champion: 2006, 2012, 2013
- NBA Finals MVP: 2006
- 13× NBA All-Star: 2005, 2006, 2007, 2008, 2009, 2010, 2011, 2012, 2013, 2014, 2015, 2016, 2019
- NBA All-Star Game MVP: 2010
- 8× All-NBA Team selections:
  - First Team: 2009, 2010
  - Second Team: 2005, 2006, 2011
  - Third Team: 2007, 2012, 2013
- 3× NBA All-Defense Team selections:
  - 3x Second Team: 2005, 2009, 2010
- NBA scoring champion: 2009
- NBA free throw scoring leaders: 2009
- NBA All-Rookie First Team: 2004
- NBA 75th Anniversary Team
- NBA Skills Challenge champion: 2006, 2007
- Magic Johnson Award: 2019
- Season-long NBA Community Assist Award: 2012–13

USA Basketball

- Gold medal with Team USA: 2008 Summer Olympic Games
- Bronze medal with Team USA: 2004 Summer Olympic Games
- Bronze medal with Team USA: 2006 FIBA World Championship

Other

- 2005 Best Breakthrough Athlete ESPY Award
- 2006 Best NBA Player ESPY Award
- 2006 Sports Illustrated Sportsman of the Year
- 2006 Sporting News Sportsman of the Year
- NAACP Image Award – President's Award

Records

- Miami Heat all-time leading scorer
- Miami Heat all-time assists leader
- Miami Heat all-time steals leader

=== Statue ===
In January 2024, the Heat announced that they were going to unveil a statue of Wade in front of Kaseya Center later that year. The statue was unveiled on October 27, 2024, and was universally panned by fans and critics, who negatively compared its appearance to Laurence Fishburne and the discourse around the unveiling to the bust of Cristiano Ronaldo created by Emanuel Santos in 2017. The Atlantic described Wade's statue as "the worst statue in the history of sports". Charles Barkley said that although the statue was "a great honor", it was ugly and should be taken down. Two years later, the Heat announced that the original sculptors had updated the statue's face to better reflect Wade's likeness.

=== Dwyane Wade Boulevard ===
In July 2026, the Chicago suburb of Robbins, Illinois, where Wade grew up, officially renamed Claire Boulevard to Dwyane Wade Boulevard. The occasion was marked with a community block party on July 26 to mark 'Dwyane Wade Day'.

== Personal life ==
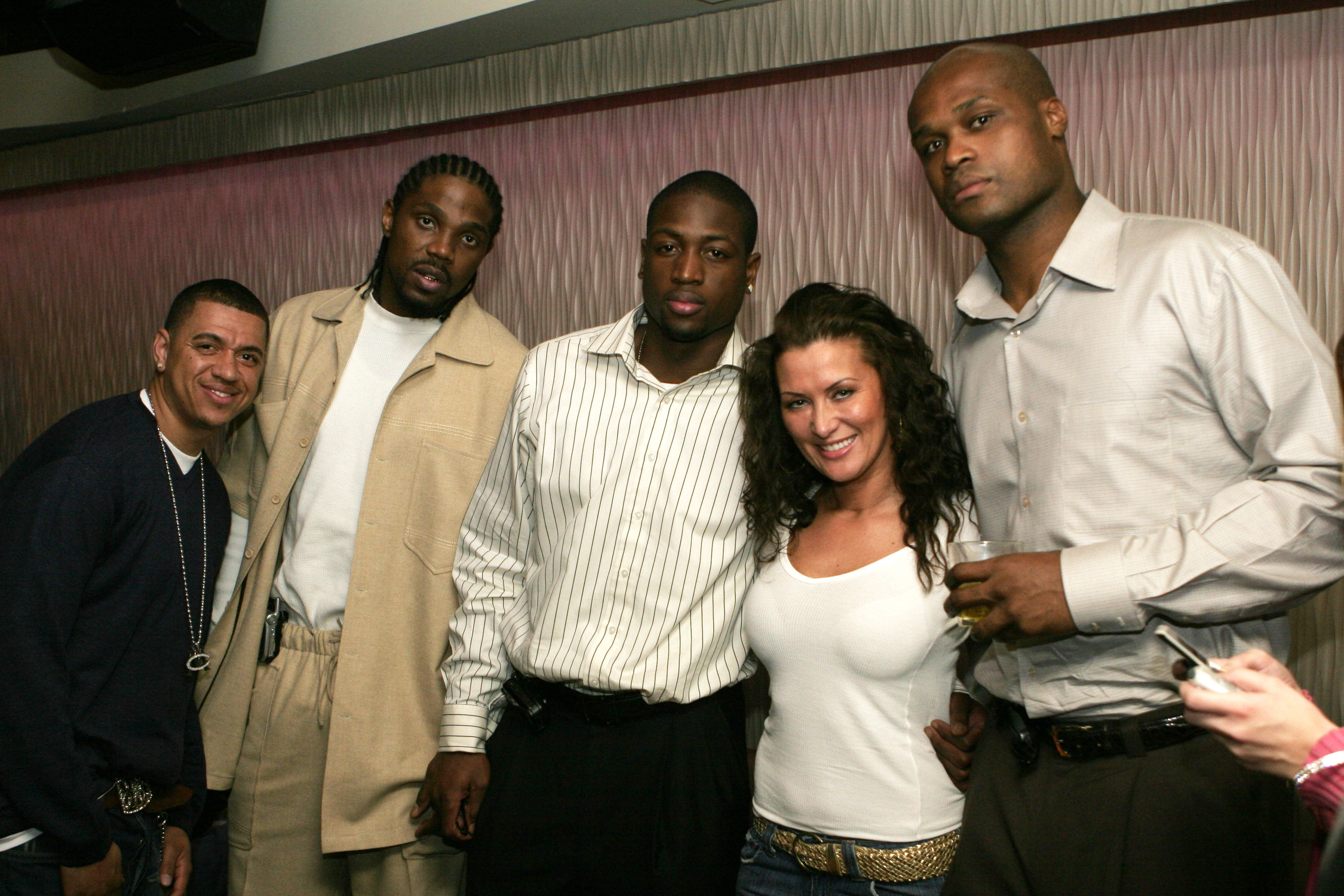
Wade at a party with then-teammates Udonis Haslem (second from left) and Antoine Walker (far right) in 2005

=== Relationships and family life ===
In 2002, Wade married his high school sweetheart Siohvaughn Funches, a counselor and author. They split in 2007, and divorced in 2010 after an acrimonious court battle. In 2011, Wade was granted sole custody of their two children. He also raises a nephew, the son of Wade's sister Deanna. Wade began dating actress Gabrielle Union in 2008. According to Wade, he and Union briefly split up at some point early in 2013 due to career demands. During that time, Wade and Aja Metoyer conceived a child. Wade and Union became engaged in December 2013 and got married in Miami on August 30, 2014. On November 7, 2018, the couple welcomed their first child together, a daughter, who was born via surrogate. In 2020, Wade's 12-year-old child came out as a transgender girl and changed her name to Zaya. During an April 2023 interview, Wade said that he moved his family out of Florida partially due to the state's anti-LGBTQ laws.

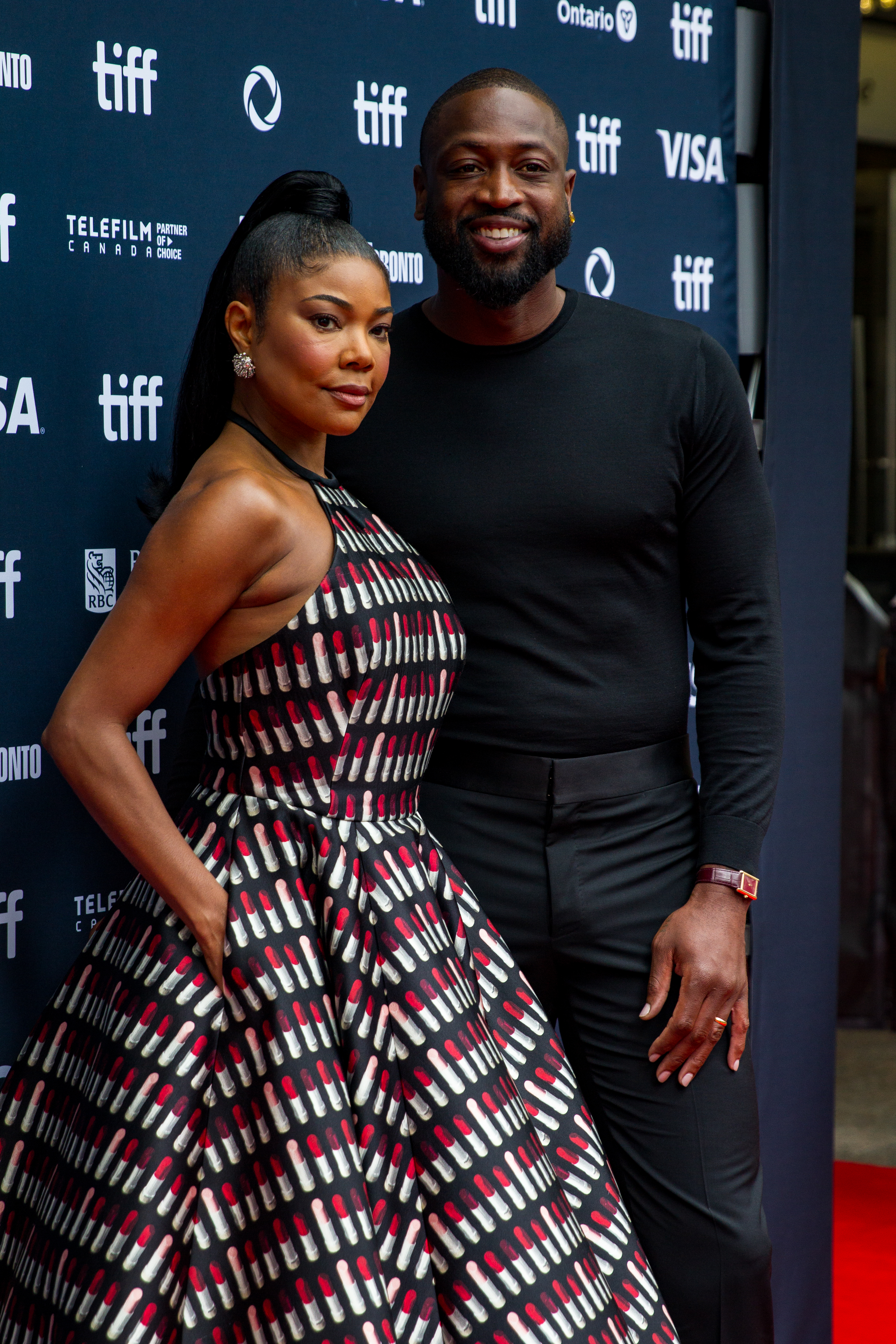
Wade with his wife Gabrielle Union in 2024

=== Branding and reception ===
Wade's nicknames include D-Wade, Father Prime, and Flash, the lattermost was given to him by former teammate Shaquille O'Neal, who would sing, "He's the greatest in the Universe", in reference to the Queen song of the same name from the 1980 film Flash Gordon. The Heat's 2005 NBA playoffs run and Wade's performances while O'Neal was hampered by injury, led to media attention and rapid increase in Wade's popularity. During those playoffs, Wade's jersey became the league's top-selling jersey and remained so for nearly two years. After the Heat's success and Wade's memorable performances during the 2006 NBA playoffs, Wade appeared on several talk shows, including Late Show with David Letterman and Live with Regis and Kelly. He also made a guest star appearance on Disney Channel's Austin & Ally as himself, who is an obsessed fan of Austin Moon.

Wade has been featured in magazine articles and publications. In 2005, he was featured on People's 50 Most Beautiful People. The following year, Wade was named the NBA's best-dressed player by GQ. In 2007, Esquire named him to their fourth annual Best Dressed Men in the World list for the second straight year. Wade's endorsement deals included Gatorade, Lincoln, Staples, Sean John, T-Mobile (his TV commercials paired him with Charles Barkley), and Topps. He had his own line of shoes with Converse named "The Wade" and a series of Sidekick phones known as the D-Wade Edition with T-Mobile. During the 2009–10 season, Wade switched from Converse to Nike's Jordan Brand. He was chosen by Jordan and debuted the Air Jordan 2010 during the 2010 NBA All-Star break. During the 2011 NBA playoffs, Wade debuted his first signature shoe for the Jordan Brand, joining Anthony and Chris Paul, who had their own signature shoes. After his Jordan Brand contract expired in 2012, Wade signed with the Chinese athletic brand Li-Ning. Wade was included in Time's list of the 100 most influential people of 2020. In April 2021, Wade became a minority owner of the Utah Jazz. In October 2021, Wade's oldest son, Zaire Wade was drafted by the Salt Lake City Stars, the NBA G League affiliate of the Jazz.

=== Philanthropy ===
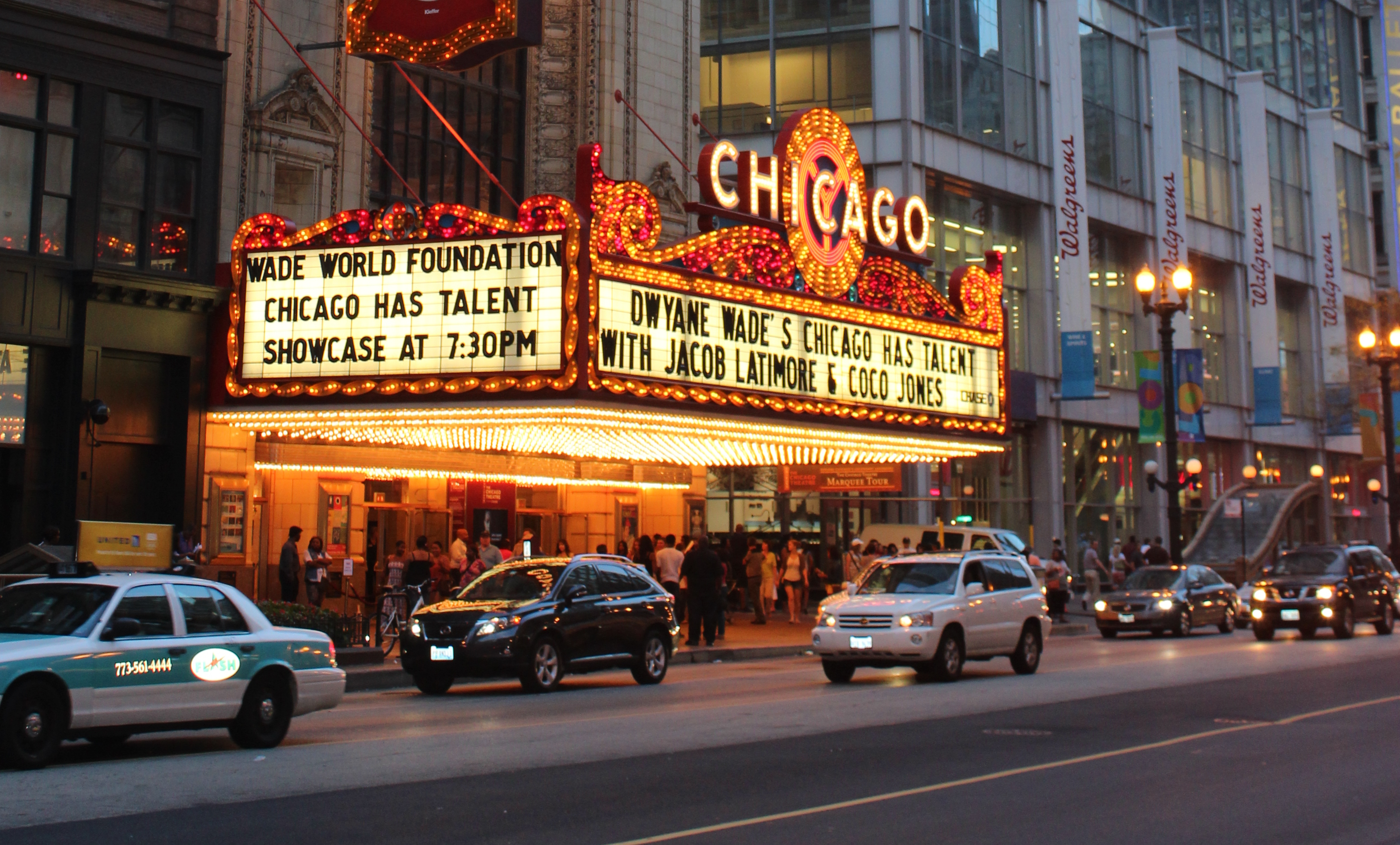
Wade is active in encouraging youth to develop their talents as seen in this talent search at the Chicago Theatre.

Wade is well known for his philanthropic involvement. In 2003, Wade founded The Wade's World Foundation, which provides support to community-based organizations that promote education, health, and social skills for children in at-risk situations. He hosts a variety of community outreach programs in Chicago and South Florida. In 2008, Wade announced his partnership with former teammate Alonzo Mourning's charitable foundation and co-hosted ZO's Summer Groove, an annual summer event. On December 24, 2008, Wade purchased a new home for a South Florida woman whose nephew accidentally burned down the family home. Wade also donated furnishings, clothing, and gifts to the family.

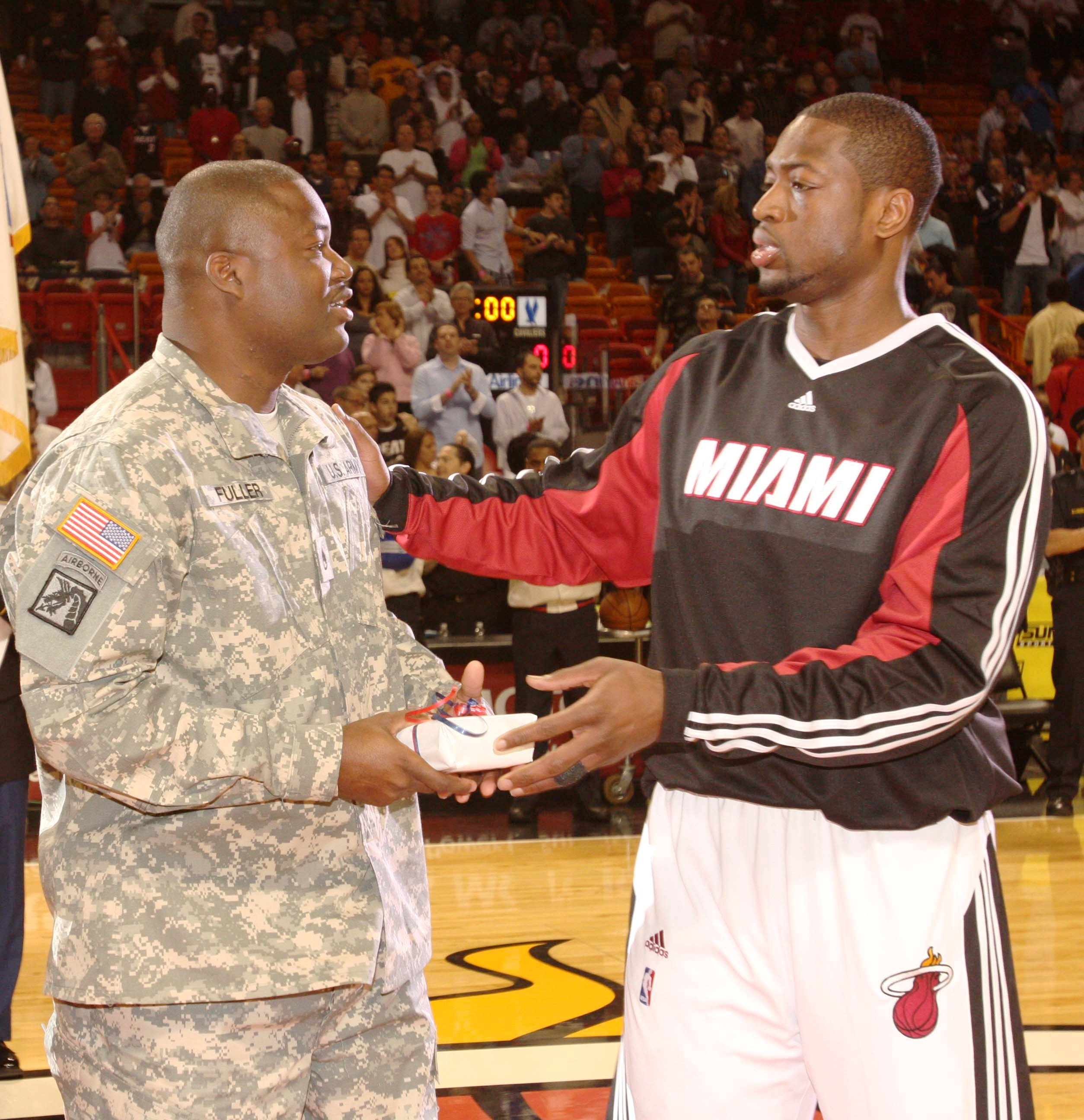
Wade giving a present to a U.S. Army reservist during a 2009 pregame ceremony

After breaking his own Miami Heat single-season scoring record, Wade gave the jersey he wore in that night's victory to eight-year-old Michael Stolzenberg, an avid Heat fan who lost his hands and feet due to a bacterial infection. Wade stated that he knew Stolzenberg previously and wished to add to his collection of Heat memorabilia. Wade is known for visiting other sick children, usually in private to avoid the media spotlight.

In September 2009, Wade donated money from his foundation to keep the Robbins, Illinois public library from having to shut down. He handed library director Priscilla Coatney a $25,000 check in order to resurrect the building. In January 2010, Wade and Mourning co-founded The Athletes Relief Fund for Haiti", which raised money to help the victims of the 2010 Haiti earthquake. In the three days after the fund began soliciting donations from athletes, Wade announced that the "Athletes Relief Fund for Haiti" had already raised over $800,000. Wade stated, "I expected nothing less from my friends and colleagues in the sports community, our commitment to this cause knows no bounds, and we will continue to accept any and all donations throughout the days ahead." Wade is also an avid supporter of St. Jude Children's Research Hospital and served as an Ambassador for their Hoops for St. Jude basketball initiative.

=== Religion ===
Wade is a Christian and chose the number 3 throughout most of his career because it represents the Holy Trinity. His mother, Jolinda, strengthened her ties to Christianity in 2001 after years of drug problems. Jolinda served as a minister during her final prison sentence in 2002 and 2003. Jolinda was ordained as a Baptist minister in January 2007 and formed the non-denominational Temple of Praise Binding and Loosing Ministry in Chicago. In May 2008, Wade purchased a church building for his mother's ministry. He tithes 10% of his salary to his mother's church.

=== Television ===
In 2007, Wade appeared as a role model on Season 3, Episode 13, of Supernanny and gave advice to the family's son. In 2019, he appeared as a guest judge on season 14 of America's Got Talent alongside his wife, Gabrielle Union. Wade pressed the Golden Buzzer for dance group V.Unbeatable. In 2021, it was said that he would be the host of The Cube, which is currently aired on TBS.

=== 2020 tweet ===
In July 2020, Wade tweeted in support of Nick Cannon, who was fired from ViacomCBS after making racist remarks and endorsing antisemitic conspiracy theories. Following some backlash, Wade later deleted his tweet and clarified that he had expressed his support of "[Cannon's ownership of] the content and [the] brand he helped create", and affirmed that he has "zero tolerance for any hate speech."

=== Health ===
In December 2023, he underwent a partial (40%) nephrectomy to remove a cyst-tumor from his right kidney.

== See also ==
- List of NBA annual scoring leaders
- List of NBA career scoring leaders
- List of NBA career assists leaders
- List of NBA career steals leaders
- List of NBA career turnovers leaders
- List of NBA career free throw scoring leaders
- List of NBA franchise career scoring leaders
- List of NBA career playoff scoring leaders
- List of NBA career playoff assists leaders
- List of NBA career playoff steals leaders
- List of NBA career playoff turnovers leaders
- List of NBA career playoff free throw scoring leaders
- List of NBA career playoff games played leaders
- List of Olympic medalists in basketball
- History of the Miami Heat
- 2002–03 Marquette Golden Eagles men's basketball team
