= Ricky Davis =

American basketball player (born 1979)

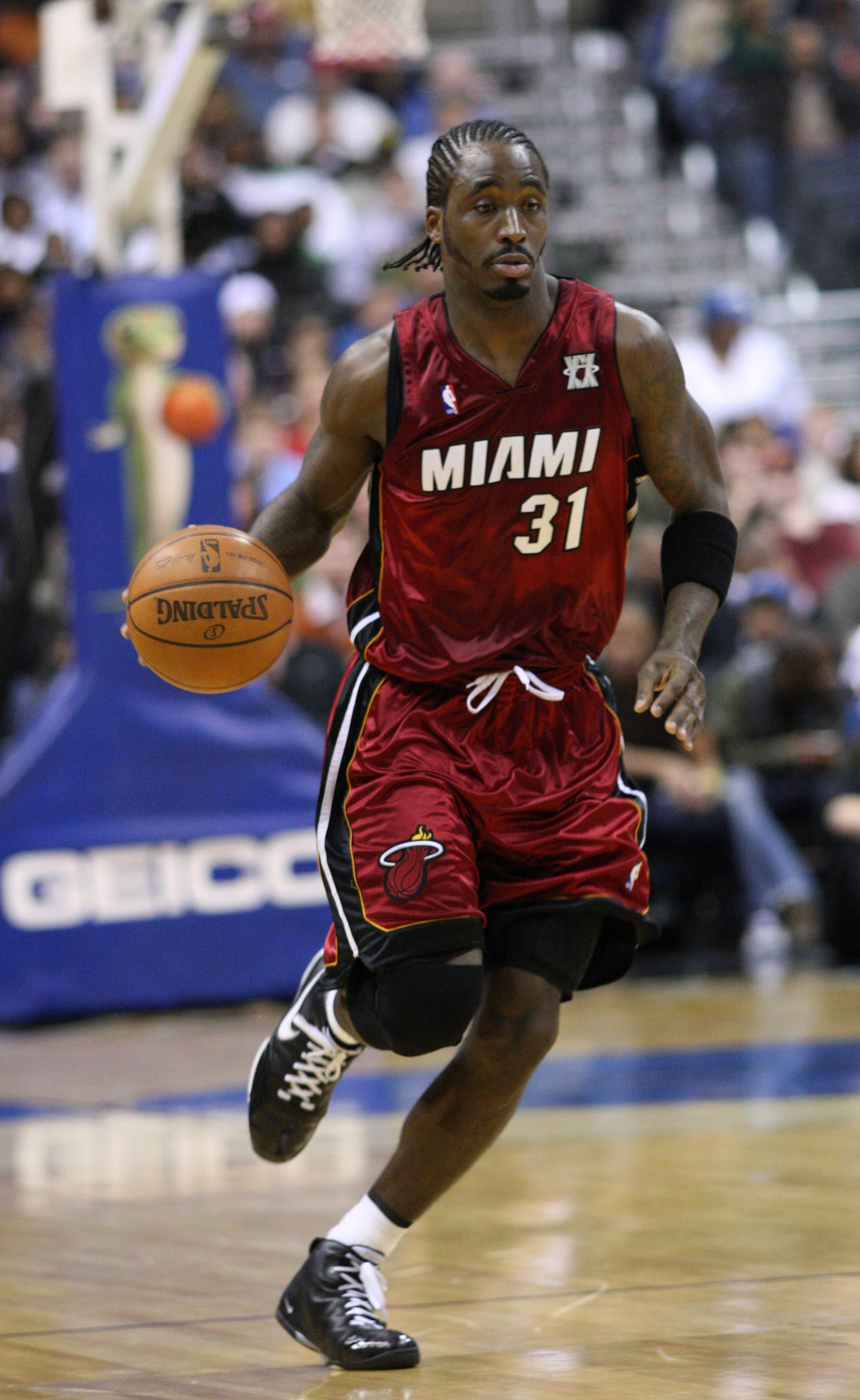
- Davis with the Miami Heat in 2007

Personal information
- Born: September 23, 1979 (age 47) Las Vegas, Nevada, U.S.
- Listed height: 6 ft 7 in (2.01 m)
- Listed weight: 195 lb (88 kg)

Career information
- High school: Davenport North (Davenport, Iowa)
- College: Iowa (1997–1998)
- NBA draft: 1998: 1st round, 21st overall pick
- Drafted by: Charlotte Hornets
- Playing career: 1998–2014
- Position: Shooting guard / small forward
- Number: 31, 21, 12

Career history
- 1998–2000: Charlotte Hornets
- 2000–2001: Miami Heat
- 2001–2003: Cleveland Cavaliers
- 2003–2006: Boston Celtics
- 2006–2007: Minnesota Timberwolves
- 2007–2008: Miami Heat
- 2008–2010: Los Angeles Clippers
- 2010: Türk Telekom
- 2010: Jiangsu Dragons
- 2011: Chorale Roanne
- 2011–2012: Maine Red Claws
- 2012: Piratas de Quebradillas
- 2013–2014: Erie BayHawks

Career highlights
- Fourth-team Parade All-American (1997)

Career NBA statistics
- Points: 9,912 (13.5 ppg)
- Rebounds: 2,550 (3.5 rpg)
- Assists: 2,426 (3.3 apg)
- Stats at NBA.com
- Stats at Basketball Reference

Tyree Ricardo Davis (born September 23, 1979) is an American former professional basketball player who played twelve seasons in the National Basketball Association (NBA). He played college basketball for the Iowa Hawkeyes.

== Early life ==
Davis attended North High School in Davenport, Iowa. He was a four-year starter and the Davenport North team made the state tournament his junior and senior years but did not reach the championship. His father is Tyree Davis and Mother is Linda Davis, he had an older brother named Alonge who died on February 14, 2020, and he has a younger brother named Edward. Davis played one season at the University of Iowa before being selected by the Charlotte Hornets in the first round of the 1998 NBA draft, as the 21st pick overall.

== Professional career ==
=== Charlotte Hornets (1998–2000) ===
Davis played two seasons with the Charlotte Hornets, and became known for his high energy play and exciting poster dunks. Although he only played limited minutes, mostly off the bench, his high-flying play got him an invitation to the 2000 Slam Dunk competition, where he scored an 88 out of a possible 100 points, losing to champion Vince Carter. He was traded to the Miami Heat in a massive nine-player trade on August 1, 2000.

=== Miami Heat (2000–2001) ===
Davis injured his ankle and knee with the Heat and only played a total of seven games for them, and was eventually sent to the Cleveland Cavaliers in a three-team deal involving the Toronto Raptors a year later on October 26, 2001.

=== Cleveland Cavaliers (2001–2003) ===
Davis was re-signed to a six-year deal by the Cavaliers on August 21, 2002, but his time in Cleveland was marked by disputes with coach Paul Silas.

==== Failed triple-double attempt ====
He additionally received attention for stat padding in a home game against the Utah Jazz on March 16, 2003.

The Cavaliers were leading 120–95 and less than 7 seconds remaining, Davis was one rebound short of his first career triple double, and he deliberately tossed an inbound pass off his own rim and caught it in attempt to receive credit for a rebound, but shots taken at one's own basket do not count as official field goal attempts.

Jazz guard DeShawn Stevenson shoved Davis in response as Davis proceeded upcourt with the ball. Jazz head coach Jerry Sloan came to Stevenson's defense citing "I would have fouled him too. I would have knocked him on his ass."

The Cavaliers initially said they would not punish Davis, saying the embarrassment was enough. However, in the face of public backlash, the Cavaliers fined him an undisclosed amount for unsportsmanlike conduct, and the play led to Davis being nicknamed "Wrong Rim Ricky" in Cleveland.

In 2025, Davis falsely claimed on the "Out the Mud" podcast that in each of the previous five games, he had been one rebound or assist short of a triple-double. In fact in his previous five games the closest he had been to a triple-double was a game with 7 rebounds and 7 assists. He further falsely claimed that Bob Sura intentionally missed a shot at the wrong basket in order to get a triple-double shortly after. In fact Sura took a shot at the correct basket intending to miss it so that he could get the rebound and his third straight triple-double. The NBA disallowed the rebound the day after the game, denying Sura the triple-double.

=== Boston Celtics (2003–2006) ===
On December 15, 2003, Davis was traded along with Chris Mihm, Michael Stewart, and a second round draft pick to the Boston Celtics in exchange for Tony Battie, Eric Williams, and Kedrick Brown. With the Celtics, the 6-foot-7-inch (2.01 m) Davis played the position of shooting guard, as well as small forward on occasion. Boston was criticized for acquiring him via trade due to Davis's reputation of selfishness, but he became a more consistent player and a fan-favorite in the city.

=== Minnesota Timberwolves (2006–2007) ===
On January 26, 2006, Davis was traded to the Minnesota Timberwolves with Mark Blount, Marcus Banks, Justin Reed, and two second round draft picks for Wally Szczerbiak, Michael Olowokandi, Dwayne Jones and a first round draft pick.

=== Return to Miami (2007–2008) ===
On October 24, 2007, Davis was again traded to the Miami Heat along with teammate Mark Blount in exchange for the Heat's Antoine Walker, Michael Doleac, Wayne Simien and a first-round draft pick. Davis was reunited with Pat Riley, and Riley admitted he made a mistake of trading Davis in the first place; "I made the mistake of trading him. He's a very talented kid. He was not a problem here. We just needed to move and get bigger players at that time. Over the last six years he has been very efficient."

=== Los Angeles Clippers (2008–2010) ===
On July 28, 2008, Davis signed a multi-year contract with the Los Angeles Clippers. He was waived by the Clippers on February 16, 2010, to make room for newly acquired guard Steve Blake and forward Travis Outlaw. He appeared in 36 games for the Clippers in the 2009/10 season.

=== Türk Telekom (2010) ===
On March 1, 2010, Davis signed a contract with the Turkish team Türk Telekom. It would be his first time playing outside the United States. He said about signing with Telekom: "It will be my first European experience. I never watched matches. I just entered myself, and Turk Telekom B.K. signed me."

=== Jiangsu Dragons (2010) ===
In October 2010, Davis signed a contract with the Jiangsu Dragons in China.

=== Chorale Roanne (2011) ===
In January 2011, Davis signed a contract with Chorale Roanne Basket in France.

=== Maine Red Claws (2011–2012) ===
On December 28, 2011, Davis was acquired by the Maine Red Claws of the NBA Development League. On January 21, 2012, he was waived by the Red Claws.

=== Piratas de Quebradillas (2012) ===
In 2012, Davis signed with the Piratas de Quebradillas of Puerto Rico.

=== Erie BayHawks (2013–2014) ===
In November 2013, Davis was acquired by the Erie BayHawks of the NBA D-League. On March 18, 2014, he was released by the BayHawks.

== NBA career statistics ==
Legend
GP	Games played	GS	Games started	MPG	Minutes per game
FG%	Field goal percentage	3P%	3-point field goal percentage	FT%	Free throw percentage
RPG	Rebounds per game	APG	Assists per game	SPG	Steals per game
BPG	Blocks per game	PPG	Points per game	**Bold**	Career high
*	Led the league

=== Regular season ===
Year	Team	GP	GS	MPG	FG%	3P%	FT%	RPG	APG	SPG	BPG	PPG
1998–99	Charlotte	46	1	12.1	.405	.167	.763	1.8	1.3	.7	.2	4.5
1999–00	Charlotte	48	4	11.9	**.503**	.000	.765	1.7	1.3	.6	.2	4.7
2000–01	Miami	7	0	10.0	.414	**1.000**	**.875**	1.0	1.6	.7	.3	4.6
2001–02	Cleveland	**82**	8	23.8	.481	.314	.790	3.0	2.2	.8	.3	11.7
2002–03	Cleveland	79	76	39.6	.410	.363	.748	4.9	**5.5**	**1.6**	**.5**	**20.6**
2003–04	Cleveland	22	22	36.2	.431	.354	.680	**5.5**	5.0	1.1	.4	15.3
2003–04	Boston	57	5	29.4	.488	.380	.732	4.2	2.6	1.2	.2	14.1
2004–05	Boston	**82**	11	32.9	.462	.339	.815	3.0	3.0	1.1	.3	16.0
2005–06	Boston	42	42	**41.6**	.464	.320	.787	4.5	5.3	1.2	.2	19.7
2005–06	Minnesota	36	36	40.6	.429	.282	.807	4.6	4.8	1.2	.2	19.1
2006–07	Minnesota	81	**81**	37.3	.465	.397	.839	3.9	4.8	1.0	.3	17.0
2007–08	Miami	**82***	47	36.1	.433	.405	.787	4.3	3.4	1.1	.2	13.8
2008–09	L.A. Clippers	36	9	21.8	.339	.315	.861	1.7	2.3	.5	.1	6.4
2009–10	L.A. Clippers	36	2	13.9	.434	.381	.581	1.6	1.1	.3	.1	4.4
Career		736	344	29.8	.446	.361	.781	3.5	3.3	1.0	.3	13.5

=== Playoffs ===
Year	Team	GP	GS	MPG	FG%	3P%	FT%	RPG	APG	SPG	BPG	PPG
2004	Boston	4	0	30.8	.400	**.400**	.688	3.0	**3.5**	.5	.0	11.8
2005	Boston	**7**	**2**	**34.3**	**.432**	.333	**.769**	**3.6**	2.0	**1.3**	**.3**	**12.4**
Career		11	2	33.0	.421	.368	.738	3.4	2.5	1.0	.2	12.2

== Community activism ==
Davis founded the charity Feed Your City Challenge, which has been a major supplier of groceries to people particularly in the Houston and Minneapolis areas and which also partnered with Suave House Records to provide PPE and other supplies to cities during the COVID-19 pandemic.

He lives in Pearland, Texas.
