= Marcus Banks =

American basketball player (born 1981)

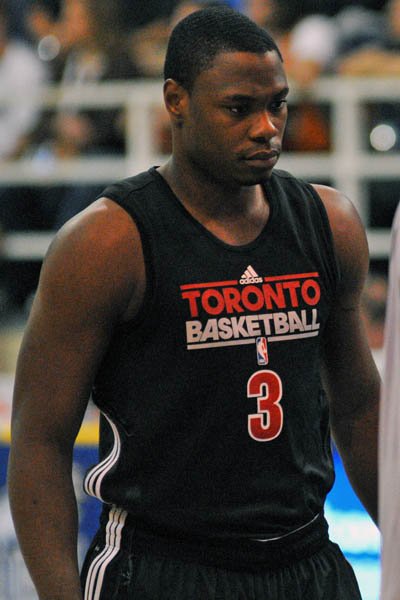
- Banks with the Toronto Raptors in 2010

Personal information
- Born: November 19, 1981 (age 44) Las Vegas, Nevada, U.S.
- Listed height: 6 ft 2 in (1.88 m)
- Listed weight: 205 lb (93 kg)

Career information
- High school: Cimarron-Memorial (Las Vegas, Nevada)
- College: Dixie State (1999–2001); UNLV (2001–2003)
- NBA draft: 2003: 1st round, 13th overall pick
- Drafted by: Memphis Grizzlies
- Playing career: 2003–2016
- Position: Point guard

Career history
- 2003–2006: Boston Celtics
- 2006: Minnesota Timberwolves
- 2006–2008: Phoenix Suns
- 2008–2009: Miami Heat
- 2009–2010: Toronto Raptors
- 2010–2011: New Orleans Hornets
- 2012: Idaho Stampede
- 2012–2013: Panathinaikos Athens
- 2014–2015: SLUC Nancy Basket
- 2016: Champville
- 2016: Al Gharafa

Career highlights
- Greek League champion (2013); Greek Cup winner (2013)
- Stats at NBA.com
- Stats at Basketball Reference

Arthur Lemarcus Banks III (born November 19, 1981) is an American former professional basketball player. He played college basketball for the UNLV Runnin' Rebels, where he was Co-Defensive Player of the Year as a senior. He was selected with the 13th pick in the first round of the 2003 NBA draft by the Memphis Grizzlies, then traded to the Boston Celtics, along with Kendrick Perkins.

== College career ==
After playing two years at Dixie College, a junior college in St. George, Utah, Banks transferred to UNLV. He played for the UNLV Runnin' Rebels, where he was Co-Defensive Player of the Year of the Mountain West Conference as a senior.

== Professional career ==
=== NBA ===
Banks was selected as the thirteenth pick in the first round of the 2003 NBA draft by the Memphis Grizzlies; however, he was then traded to the Boston Celtics along with Kendrick Perkins for Troy Bell and Dahntay Jones. The Celtics agreed to trade him to the Los Angeles Lakers in 2004 for Gary Payton, but returned to Boston after the trade was amended following Payton's refusal to take a physical. Payton would later be acquired by the Celtics in a trade involving different players.

In Boston, Banks was known for his good defense and ball handling; Allen Iverson, a division-rival point guard, named Banks as the toughest defender he faced in his career. However, coach Doc Rivers had high hopes for young guard Delonte West, and Banks' minutes were reduced. On January 26, 2006, it was announced that Banks, Mark Blount, Ricky Davis and Justin Reed were traded to the Minnesota Timberwolves for Wally Szczerbiak, Michael Olowokandi and Dwayne Jones.

Banks signed as a free agent with the Phoenix Suns on July 19, 2006.

In 2007, the Suns spent training camp working Banks into a shooting-guard role when they were not seeking a trade, a tough proposition with Banks in the second year of a five-year, $21.3 million contract.

On February 6, 2008, Banks, along with All-Star forward Shawn Marion, was traded to the Miami Heat for Shaquille O'Neal. On February 13, 2009, Banks and Marion were traded to the Toronto Raptors for Jermaine O'Neal and Jamario Moon. Banks' final game in the NBA was during his time with the Raptors on November 16, 2010, in a 94–109 loss to the Washington Wizards. In his final game, Banks recorded 2 points and 2 assists.

On November 20, 2010, Banks was traded to the New Orleans Hornets with Jarrett Jack and David Andersen for Peja Stojaković and Jerryd Bayless. In his 5 1/2-month tenure with the Hornets, Banks never played a game for the team, effectively ending his NBA career.

=== Overseas ===
On November 12, 2012, Banks was acquired by the Greek League club Panathinaikos Athens. He was released in May 2013.

== NBA career statistics ==
Legend
GP	Games played	GS	Games started	MPG	Minutes per game
FG%	Field goal percentage	3P%	3-point field goal percentage	FT%	Free throw percentage
RPG	Rebounds per game	APG	Assists per game	SPG	Steals per game
BPG	Blocks per game	PPG	Points per game	**Bold**	Career high

=== Regular season ===
Year	Team	GP	GS	MPG	FG%	3P%	FT%	RPG	APG	SPG	BPG	PPG
2003–04	Boston	**81**	2	17.1	.400	.314	.756	1.6	2.2	1.1	.2	5.9
2004–05	Boston	**81**	2	14.1	.402	.356	.742	1.6	1.9	.8	.2	4.6
2005–06	Boston	18	1	14.9	.413	.316	**.900**	1.1	1.8	.4	.0	5.5
2005–06	Minnesota	40	**28**	**30.7**	.479	.364	.778	**2.9**	**4.7**	**1.2**	.3	**12.0**
2006–07	Phoenix	45	1	11.2	.429	.172	.800	.8	1.3	.5	.1	4.9
2007–08	Phoenix	24	1	12.9	.404	.385	.750	.8	1.0	.3	.3	5.2
2007–08	Miami	12	2	21.6	.512	**.405**	.789	2.1	3.0	.5	**.4**	9.5
2008–09	Miami	16	0	10.4	.385	.143	.667	.9	1.4	.6	.1	2.6
2008–09	Toronto	6	0	6.7	.333	.200	.333	.5	1.0	.2	.0	2.3
2009–10	Toronto	22	0	11.1	**.534**	.292	.828	1.0	1.2	.5	.1	5.0
2010–11	Toronto	3	0	7.3	.000	.000	.750	.3	1.0	.3	.0	2.0
Career		348	37	16.0	.432	.327	.768	1.5	2.1	.8	.2	5.9

=== Playoffs ===
Year	Team	GP	GS	MPG	FG%	3P%	FT%	RPG	APG	SPG	BPG	PPG
2004	Boston	4	0	15.0	.438	.400	**1.000**	**1.8**	**1.8**	.5	**.3**	**5.0**
2005	Boston	**7**	0	**15.1**	**.448**	**.500**	.500	1.6	1.0	**.6**	.0	4.6
2007	Phoenix	2	0	3.5	.000	.000	**1.000**	.0	.5	.0	.0	1.0
Career		13	0	13.3	.426	.417	.750	1.4	1.2	.5	.1	4.2
