= OssaTron =

Medical treatment device

The OssaTron is a high energy shock wave system that provides a non-surgical alternative for patients diagnosed with chronic proximal plantar fasciopathy (severe heel pain), usually referred to as fasciitis. Using a unique process known as Orthotripsy, the OssaTron emits shock waves, similar to those used to treat kidney stones, in an attempt to increase blood flow and stimulate healing of the affected heel.

== Device ==
The OssaTron is the first shock wave unit developed especially for orthopaedic applications. The OssaTron covers a range of orthopaedic indications suitable for Shock Wave Technology. It is marketed as the only Extracorporeal Shock Wave Technology (ESWT) system approved by the U.S. Food and Drug Administration (FDA) for the treatment of multiple orthopaedic conditions. The OssaTron is currently FDA approved to treat chronic plantar fasciitis (heel pain) and chronic lateral epicondylitis (tennis elbow) when these conditions have failed to respond to conservative treatments.

== Procedure ==
Once anesthesia has been administered, high viscosity ultrasound gel is applied to the area experiencing pain (target tissue). The gel promotes shock wave conductance, enhancing treatment effectiveness. The Ossatron Application Technician then activates the shock wave via the shock wave release hand piece on the console.

== Post-procedure ==
It is recommended after treatment that the patient restrict "stressful activity" such as jogging, heavy housework or yard work, and participating in sports for four weeks. Pain relief begins for patients at different times. For some patients it is immediate; for others it may take four weeks. The full effect of the OssaTron procedure may not be realized until the twelfth week following treatment. If relief has not been achieved at this point, a second OssaTron procedure may be recommended by the patient's physician.

== Lawsuit ==
A class action lawsuit settlement approved by a federal judge suggests that the manufacturer of the Ossatron made material misrepresentations and/or omitted to make material disclosures concerning the efficiency, testing and market acceptance of the OssaTron. According to the lawsuit, the manufacturer failed to disclose to investors that some of its own tests failed to support its statements that the OssaTron was more effective, safer and less costly than alternative, nonsurgical treatments for heel pain and that serious questions existed among the medical community concerning the effectiveness of extracorporeal shock wave treatment (ESWT) for heel pain. See Thomas v. HealthTronics Surgical Services, et al.. US District Court for the Northern District of Georgia, Civil Case No. 03-cv-2800.
