= Andy Elisburg =

American basketball executive

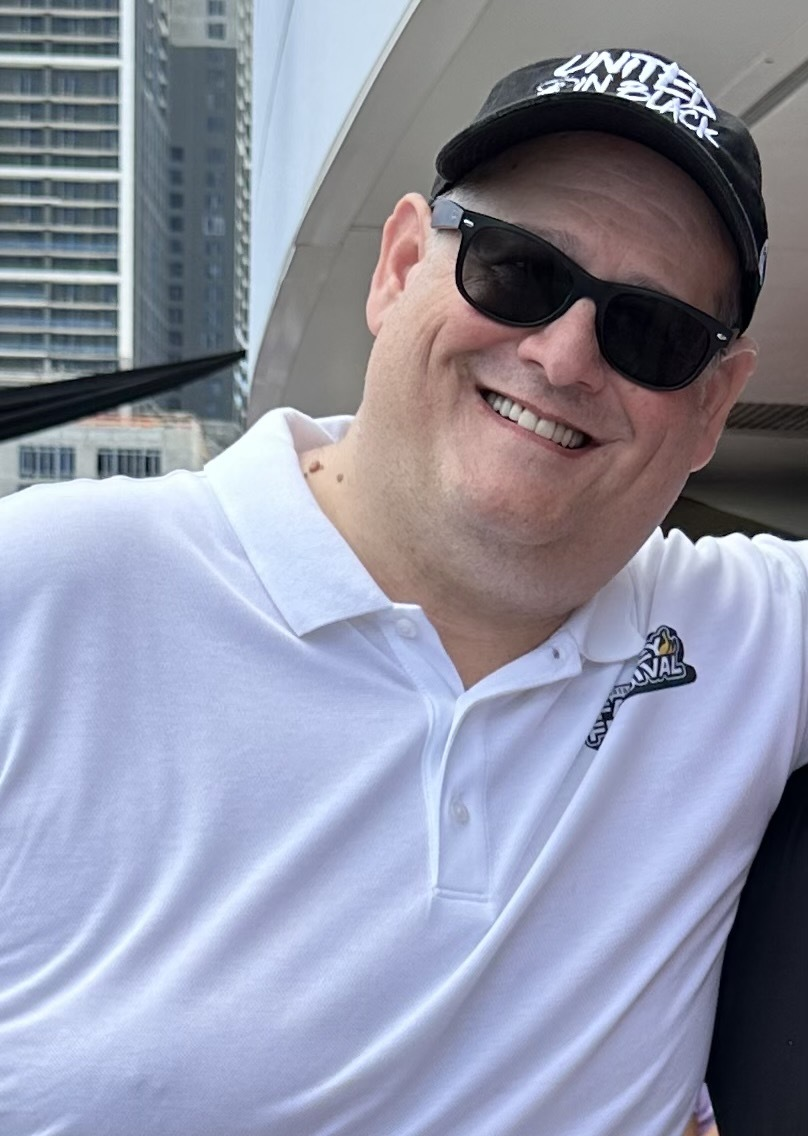
- Elisburg at 2023 Miami Heat Family Festival

Miami Heat
- Positions: Executive Vice President, Basketball Operations/General Manager
- League: NBA

Personal information
- Born: Potomac, Maryland, U.S.

Career information
- High school: Winston Churchill (Potomac, Maryland)
- College: St. Thomas University (1985–1989)

Andy Elisburg is the Executive Vice President of Basketball Operations and general manager of the Miami Heat since 2013.

St. Thomas University inducted Elisburg into the Athletic Hall of Fame (Nov. 2017) and honored him with their first Leader for Life Award (June 2004).

== Early life and career ==
Elisburg grew up in Potomac, Maryland, and graduated from Winston Churchill High School in 1985. Elisburg's grandparents gifted him a computer while in high school. Elisburg attended St. Thomas University in Miami Gardens, Florida from 1985 to 1989 where he received a degree in sports administration, was the student manager of the St. Thomas men's basketball team, and editor of St. Thomas' student newspaper. At the time, Elisburg decided on St. Thomas University because it was one of the few colleges providing classes in sports administration. During the summer of 1988 between his junior and senior year from college, Elisburg was an unpaid intern for the Washington Bullets working for Mark Pray, who would become the new Miami Heat public relations director the following year and eventually recruit Elisburg. During his senior year, Elisburg was considering a career in baseball management and decided to partake in Baseball Winter Meetings in Atlanta.

Elisburg helped launch the St. Thomas University athletic department's TOTAL program, a student-athlete success program.

== Miami Heat ==
On November 19, 1988, Elisburg began working full-time with the Heat organization as a public relations intern under director Mark Pray in the inaugural 1988 season.

When Elisburg first joined the Miami Heat, the franchise had only 20 employees excluding the players. Roles were not as clearly defined, and the small staff solved most problems via trial and error.

On September 28, 2013, Elisburg was promoted to general manager of the Miami Heat. Other franchise moves in the same month include the hiring of Juwan Howard as an assistant coach and the promoting of Adam Simon to assistant GM. Elisburg and longtime friend Erik Spoelstra have a special bond since both "started at the bottom" and worked their ways up over three decades. "Anything that goes on in this building Andy is in the know and he's basically running everything behind the scenes. Everybody in this organization knows that," Spoelstra said.

As GM of the Heat, Elisburg assists in salary cap administration, talent acquisition, league compliance, among other responsibilities. Elisburg reports to CEO Nick Arison and President Pat Riley. Elisburg also oversees the basketball operations for the Sioux Falls Skyforce working with VP of basketball operations and assistant GM Adam Simon, and director of player personnel and GM Eric Amsler. However, Riley has the final say in basketball matters, as has been the case since his arrival in Miami in 1995.

Elisburg and the Miami Heat won three NBA championships since the team’s founding. Among his accomplishments, Elisburg played key roles in the decisions to draft Dwyane Wade, acquire Shaquille O'Neal, the Big Three, and Jimmy Butler. Elisburg and Riley orchestrated a five-team, 13-player deal between Miami, Memphis, Boston, Utah and New Orleans that brought Antoine Walker, Jason Williams and James Posey to the Heat. In 2017, following the signing of James Johnson, Dion Waiters and Kelly Olynyk, Pat Riley stated "Elisburg's numbers crunching, his mind and his ability to go through...from the draft through free agency, he was the star of this whole thing...He's the best in the business and I could never do this without him."

In October 2020, Riley said "I think we'll stay the course with our picks, stay the course with our young players, We have decisions to make, obviously, with player contracts and free agents, and really do a deep dive into this season, myself and coach Erik Spoelstra and Andy Elisburg about how good we really are right now…flexibility with draft picks, free agency is coming next."

In November 2020, Goran Dragić said, "[Miami] is my home. I want to stay here in Miami. I appreciate Pat Riley, Andy Elisburg, the whole organization and what they did for me."

== Personal life ==
In May 2025, Elisburg was hospitalized and required multiple surgeries to resolve infections in his foot, back, and knee that were threatening vital organs. In addition, he needed to have part of one foot amputated.

== See also ==
- List of National Basketball Association general managers
- List of National Basketball Association team presidents
