= History of the Miami Heat =

Sports team history

The Miami Heat are an American professional basketball team based in the city of Miami, Florida. The team was launched in 1988 and played in the 1988–89 season of the National Basketball Association. The next season they moved from the Western Conference to the Atlantic Division of the Eastern Conference.

The Heat are the most successful NBA team that joined after the ABA-NBA merger. After enduring a few seasons of mediocrity, there were several team changes in 1995 and 1996 under head coach Pat Riley, including the recruitment of Isaac Austin and P.J. Brown. They reached the Eastern Conference finals for the first time in 1996–97. They did not reach the conference finals again until 2004–05, under new head coach Stan Van Gundy and with Dwyane Wade as a leading team member.

At this time, they transferred to the Southeast Division. The next year the team won the NBA Finals, defeating the Dallas Mavericks. The head coach position was next taken by Erik Spoelstra. Their next successful season was 2010–11. After acquiring LeBron James and Chris Bosh, they reached the NBA Finals again, losing to the Mavericks. They won the Finals in both 2012 and 2013, and won 27 successive games in February–March 2013. In 2013–14 they reached the Finals again but lost to San Antonio Spurs. James left the team in July 2014, and the 2014–15 season was less successful. After signing Jimmy Butler, the Heat returned again to the NBA Finals in 2020, losing to the Los Angeles Lakers. They returned to the Finals yet again in 2023 and lost to the Denver Nuggets after entering the postseason as the eighth seed, becoming the second team in league history to do so after the New York Knicks in 1999.

== 1987–1989: The NBA comes to Miami ==
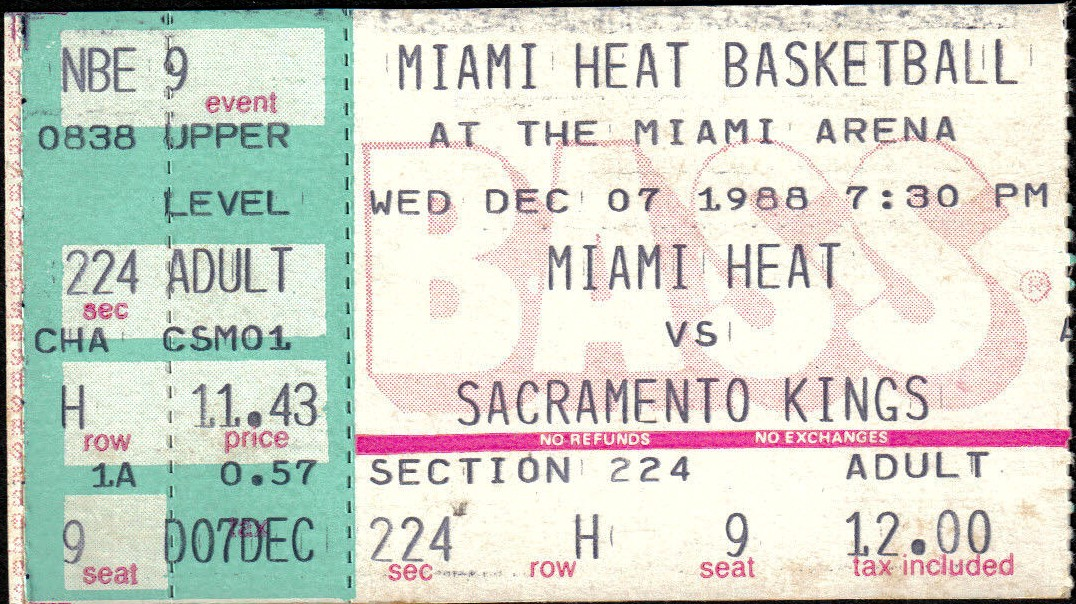
A ticket for a Dec. 1988 game between the Heat and the Sacramento Kings, the first time either team had ever faced each other in a regular season game.

In 1987, the NBA announced plans to add three teams to the league. In Florida, a state at the time without an NBA franchise, groups from Orlando, St. Petersburg and Miami applied for franchises. The Miami group was led by NBA Hall of Famer Billy Cunningham and former sports agent Lewis Schaffel, who received their financial backing from Carnival Cruise Lines founder Ted Arison, who became majority owner. Day-to-day operations would be handled by minority shareholders Cunningham and Schaffel. Julio Iglesias, Robert Sturges, Amancio Suarez and Raanan Katz were also minority shareholders. Sturges who was instrumental in bringing the NBA to Miami, represented the team on the NBA Board of Governors until 1995.

In April 1987, the NBA expansion committee endorsed the bids of the cities of Charlotte and Minneapolis. However, the committee was split between awarding the third and final franchise to Miami or Orlando. Finally, it was decided that the NBA would expand by 4 teams, with the Charlotte Hornets and Miami Heat debuting for the 1988–89 season and the Minnesota Timberwolves and Orlando Magic beginning for the 1989–90 season.

The team's name had been chosen by a survey in October 1986. After being accepted to the league, the team logo was created by Miami artist Mark Henderson, a graduate of The Art Institute of Fort Lauderdale.

As part of the expansion, the Heat would be assigned on a rotation with the three other expansion teams in a three-year process that would see Miami play in the Midwest Division of the Western Conference for their inaugural season before being moved to the Atlantic Division. (Note: In the 1988-89 season, Charlotte played in the Atlantic Division while Miami played in Midwest, with the Sacramento Kings moving permanently from the Midwest into the Pacific. In the 1989-90 season, Charlotte and Minnesota played in the Midwest Division, Orlando played in the Central Division and Miami was moved to the Atlantic. In the 1990-91 season, Minnesota and Orlando played in the Midwest Division, Charlotte played in the Central and Miami played in the Atlantic. Finally, in the 1991-92 season, Orlando settled in the Atlantic with Miami, Charlotte settled in the Central, and Minnesota settled in the Midwest.) The Heat came into the NBA for the 1988–89 season with a roster full of young players and journeymen. Among the players on the inaugural roster were first-round picks Rony Seikaly and Kevin Edwards, fellow rookies Grant Long and Sylvester Gray, as well as NBA vets Rory Sparrow, Jon Sundvold, Pat Cummings, Scott Hastings, Dwayne "Pearl" Washington and Billy Thompson. The team started out the season by losing its first 17 games, including a blowout 138–91, to Magic Johnson's Los Angeles Lakers, at the time an NBA record. Part of the first year struggles can be attributed to the Heat being placed in the Midwest Division of the Western Conference, despite being located on the East Coast. The team finished with a league-worst 15–67 win–loss record.

Original Heat logo (1988–1999) Logo created by artist, Mark Henderson of Duluth, GA

== 1989–1995: Glen Rice era ==
The Heat picked Glen Rice from the University of Michigan in the first round of the 1989 NBA draft, and Sherman Douglas of Syracuse University in the 2nd round. The team also moved to the Atlantic Division of the Eastern Conference for the 1989–90 season, where they remained for the next 15 years until the creation of the Southeast division. However, the Heat continued to struggle and ended the season with an 18–64 record.

After the 1989–90 season, Miami was awarded the 3rd pick overall. The team pursued two trades, with the Denver Nuggets and the Houston Rockets, in exchange for 9th and 12th picks. They used these picks to select Willie Burton of the University of Minnesota and Alec Kessler of the University of Georgia. Burton sat out part of the season, and Kessler struggled with injury problems. While Rice, Seikaly and Douglas all showed improvement from the previous year, Miami went 24–58 and remained in the bottom of the Atlantic Division. Rothstein resigned as head coach at the end of the season, but returned to the Heat prior to the 2004–05 season as an assistant coach, a role he held until the end of the 2014–15 season.

After Rothstein's resignation prior to the 1991–92 season, the Heat hired Kevin Loughery, who had experience in the NBA both as a coach and a player, to be their new head coach.

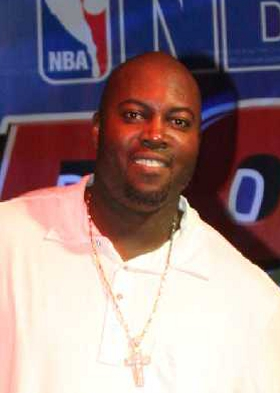
Glen Rice played six seasons with the Heat from 1989 to 1995.

For the 1991 NBA draft, the team selected Steve Smith from Michigan State, a guard. With the help of rookie Smith, Rony Seikaly, and a more experienced Glen Rice, the Heat finished in fifth place in the Atlantic Division with a 38–44 record, including a loss to the Cleveland Cavaliers 148–80, and made the playoffs for the first time in their history. Playing the 1991 champions Chicago Bulls, the Heat were swept in three games. That season, Steve Smith made the NBA All-Rookie team.

The 1992–93 NBA season included the additions of draft choice Harold Miner of the University of Southern California, as well as trading a 1st round pick for Detroit Pistons forward/center John Salley.

Salley's addition was met with hope because of the role that he played on back to back championship Pistons teams. Unfortunately, by this point in his career, Salley was better suited for a role on another contending team rather than a heavy minutes rotation player on a playoff hopeful like Miami was. Miami would eventually make Salley available in the 1995 expansion draft where he'd eventually be drafted by the Toronto Raptors. The 1992–93 season started off poorly, with Smith missing time with a knee injury and Burton being lost for most of the year with a wrist injury. Upon Smith's return, Miami posted a winning record in February and March, but it was not enough to make up for the 13–27 hole they began in. They finished 36–46 and did not return to the playoffs.

The team fared better in 1993–94, posting the franchise's first-ever winning record at 42–40 and returning to the playoffs as the No. 8 seed versus the Atlanta Hawks. After Miami had a 2–1 series lead, Atlanta rallied from the deficit to win the best-of-5 series. After the season, Steve Smith was selected as a member of the 2nd Dream Team, the collection of NBA All-Stars who were selected to compete in the 1994 FIBA World Championship in Toronto as Team USA. Dream Team II, also made up of future Heat players Shaquille O'Neal and Dan Majerle, would go on to win the tournament.

In 1994–95, the team overhauled their roster, trading away Seikaly, Smith and Grant Long in exchange for Kevin Willis and Billy Owens.

== 1995–2000: Alonzo Mourning and Tim Hardaway era ==
With a losing record for the franchise and lack of identity or brand recognition, Lewis Schaffel and Billy Cunningham decided to sell their interest in the team. Micky Arison, son of franchise patriarch Ted Arison, stepped forward to purchase a controlling interest in the Heat on February 13, 1995, ceding control of the franchise to his family. As the new managing general partner, Arison hired Dave Wohl as general manager, who fired head coach Kevin Loughery and replaced him with Alvin Gentry on an interim basis to try to shake up the 17–30 Heat. Gentry went 15–21 for the remaining 36 games of the season for a 32–50 record overall, 10 games off the previous year's mark. During that interim period with Gentry, the Heat got one of the best wins in franchise history when they beat the Los Angeles Clippers 126–83. Furthermore, Rice scored 56 points against the Orlando Magic, setting the record for the highest individual single-game point total at the time. At the NBA All-Star Game in Phoenix, Arizona, Heat player Harold Miner repeated as the winner of the NBA Slam Dunk Contest and Glen Rice won the NBA Three Point Shootout. As Arison began remodeling the Miami Heat into a championship-contending organization, the continued improvements of the Heat players garnered major media attention, although the Heat would go on to miss the playoffs for the fifth time in seven years. However, the fortunes of the Miami Heat would change dramatically in the summer of 1995; the off-season of that year became one of the most poignant in the history of the franchise.

=== 1995–1996: Arrival of Pat Riley ===
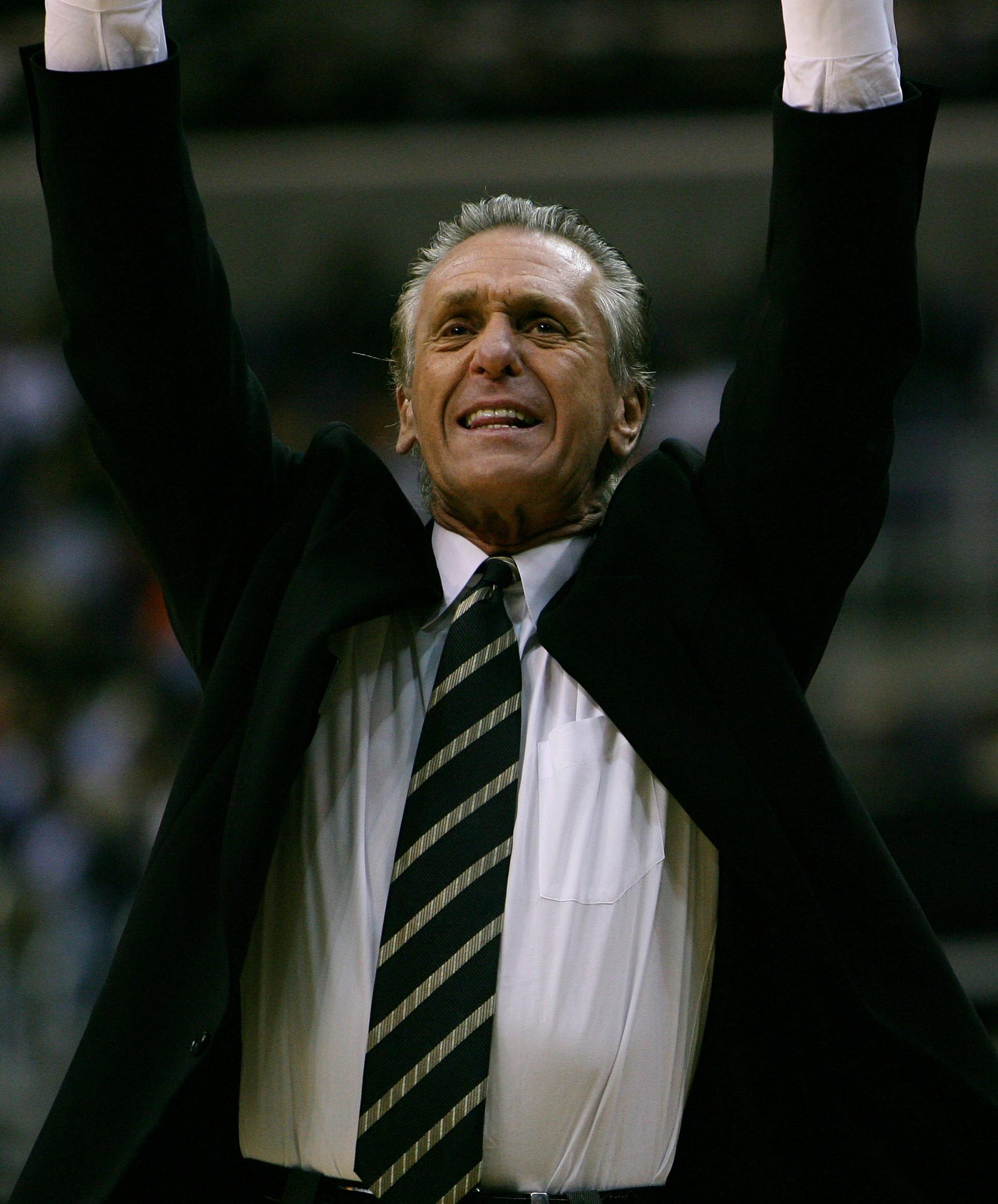
Team president Pat Riley restructured the Heat into perennial contenders as its general manager and head coach.

Setting the tone for a new era of Heat basketball, Arison hired Pat Riley to be the new head coach and team president of the Miami Heat; Riley resigned as coach of the New York Knicks immediately following the 1994–1995 season. In a welcoming ceremony, the city of Miami held a parade for Riley when he first arrived at Miami. Shortly thereafter, Randy Pfund, Riley's former assistant on the Los Angeles Lakers, was brought in to be the executive vice president of the Miami Heat. Determined to bring a championship to Miami, Riley brought a culture of conditioning and player development. He dropped a bombshell two nights before the season began, sending Glen Rice, Matt Geiger and four other players to the Hornets in exchange for All-Star center Alonzo Mourning. At the beginning of the season, the Heat won eleven of their first fourteen games. In mid-December, the Heat faced the Knicks for the first time in New York; Riley received a very negative reception from the fans, who often called him "Pat the Rat" for leaving the Knicks, something Riley embraced.

By the end of February, with the Heat languishing at 24–29, Riley continued overhauling the team. In a flurry of midseason deals, Riley completed three separate deals involving ten players that would include the acquisition of Tim Hardaway, Chris Gatling and Walt Williams. However, before those three could arrive in Miami, there was a game to be played against the 72–10 Chicago Bulls. With only eight players available on the roster, the Heat hustled to get their ninth teammate, in order to accommodate league rules; had Tony Smith not arrived in time for the team, Riley would have literally "signed someone off the street". Rex Chapman, who was traded to the Heat from the Washington Bullets, led the Heat to the biggest upset victory in Miami Heat history, defeating the Bulls 113–104.

Upon joining the team, Mourning and Hardaway quickly became the centerpiece of the Miami Heat; Mourning's defensive presence and rebounding expertise complimented Hardaway's play-making as a point guard, promptly forming one of the most dangerous tandems in the league at the time. With Hardaway and Mourning setting franchise records, a new excitement came from the Miami community. Finishing with a 42–40 record, the Heat made the playoffs for the third time in franchise history, but were swept in three games by the Chicago Bulls. However, the new-look Heat garnered optimism for a bright future, and they would continue to improve the following season.

=== 1996–1997: Making the conference finals ===
In the summer of 1996, the Miami Heat continued revamping their roster, trading Tyrone Corbin, Terrence Rencher, Tony Smith, Gatling, Williams and Chapman. They were planning on bringing in Juwan Howard and PJ Brown on July, but the league disallowed the Howard deal, preventing him from playing with the Heat. On the other hand, they would retain Brown and signed him to a contract. Although initially an enigma as a player, the surprisingly athletic Brown was a jack-of-all-trades, who would hustle, score, rebound and block shots whenever needed; he would become one of the most important role players for the team. Voshon Lenard and Dan Majerle were also added to the team, becoming a dangerous backcourt duo for their tenacity on defense and their specialization at three-point shooting. Majerle in particular added some versatility due to his prowess as a passer. Adding one final piece for the team, Riley acquired Jamal Mashburn, an athletic, high-scoring swing-man that could take whatever role that was asked of him. Throughout the 1996–1997 season, Riley drastically transformed the new-look Miami Heat into a defensive-minded juggernaut with an emphasis on unselfish work ethic, hustle and cooperation. Quickly becoming championship contenders, the Heat clinched a winning record of 32–9 on the road, earning the epithet of "Road Warriors".

The Heat were the biggest surprise and the league's most improved team in the season; they won their first-ever Atlantic Division title with a 61–21 record, the best regular season record in Heat history at the time. Entering the playoffs, the Heat faced their in state rivals, the Orlando Magic in the first round, blowing the Magic out in the first two games. As the series shifted to Orlando, Rony Seikaly, who was traded to Orlando, sprained his ankle in Game 3. Penny Hardaway and Darrell Armstrong led the Magic to win Games 3 and 4, extending the series to the decisive 5th game. In Game 5, Miami built a 17-point led, but Orlando closed to within three points in the fourth quarter. During the final seconds, Hardaway sank a three-point dagger that defeated the Magic, winning the first playoff series for Miami Heat. On May 8, Riley was named NBA Coach of the Year, becoming the first NBA coach to win that award on three separate teams.

In the highly anticipated Conference semifinals, the Heat would face the Knicks, of whom they shared many of the same defensive attributes and work ethic. The rough playing led to fierce competition throughout the series, sparking the beginning of one of the most vicious rivalries in NBA history. Patrick Ewing, with 24 points, led the Knicks to a game 1 victory. Two nights later, Tim Hardaway's 34 point performance helped the Heat even the series with a Game 2 win. After losing Games 3 and 4 at New York, the Knicks took a commanding 3–1 series lead. On May 14, the series shifted back to Miami for Game 5; it was a rather intense affair, with tempers flaring as the Heat's lead grew in the fourth quarter. Towards the end of the game, P.J. Brown and Charlie Ward got tangled up after a Heat player shot a free-throw. The usually mild-mannered Brown body-slammed Ward over his shoulder, sparking a brawl. It resulted in suspensions for Ward, Ewing and Allan Houston for Game 6, as well as Larry Johnson and John Starks for Game 7. Miami would play the rest of the series without Brown, who watched the last two games from his hotel room. After winning Game 6 on the road, the deciding Game 7 was at Miami. After Mourning committed his fifth foul, he was forced to sit out the rest of the game. In response, Hardaway took over the game, finally closing out the Knicks.

In their first Eastern Conference finals, the Heat faced the Chicago Bulls, falling behind 0–3. The Heat then defeated the Bulls by eight points after Mourning famously guaranteed a Game 4 victory. The Bulls defeated the Heat in Game 5, taking the series.

=== 1997–1999: Repeat New York upsets ===
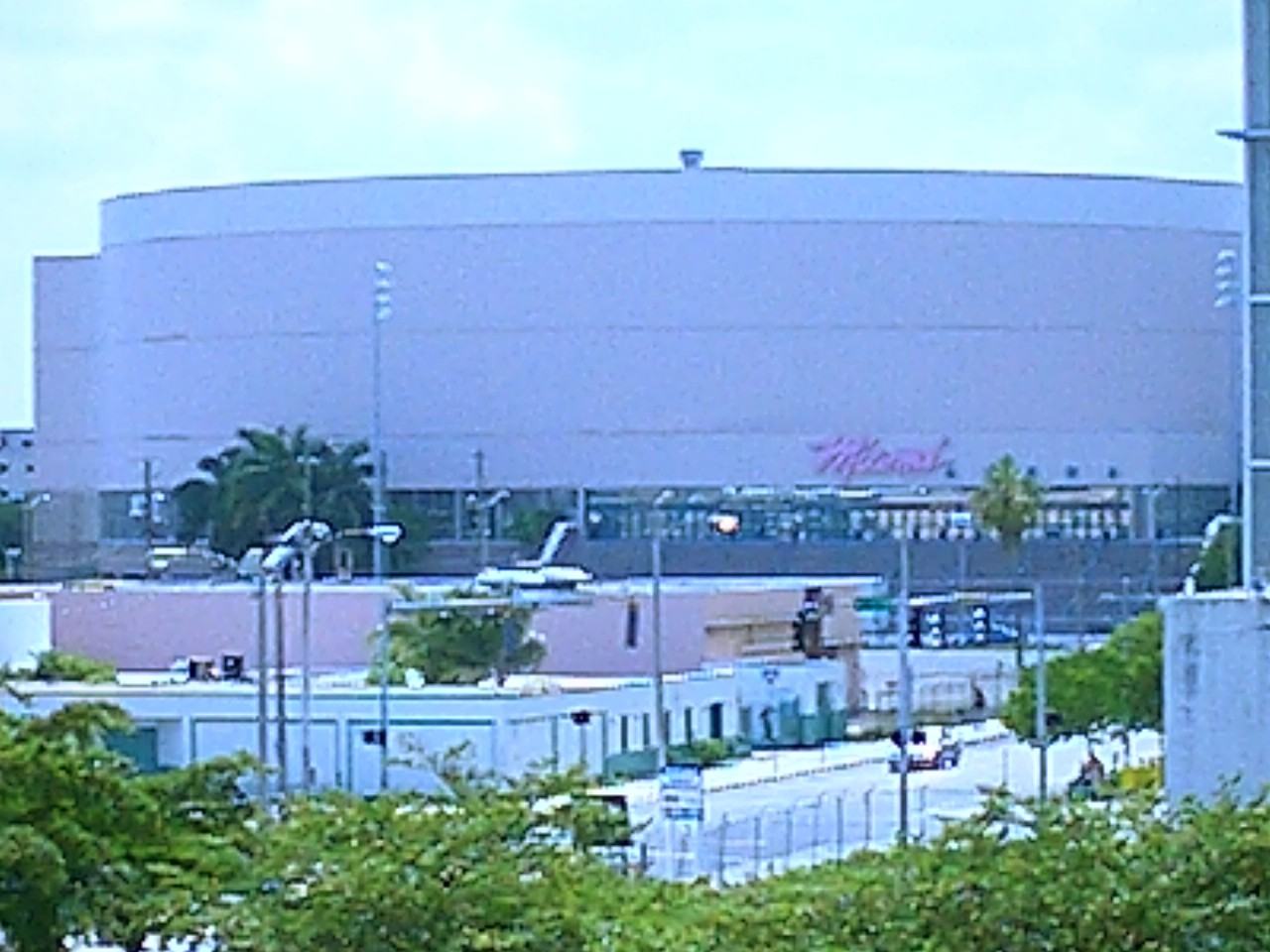
The Heat played their home games in the Miami Arena from 1988 to 1999

During the offseason, the team's focus shifted to building a new, better arena to replace the Miami Arena. After overcoming political opposition, the organization celebrated their 10-year anniversary as AmericanAirlines Arena broke ground on January 27, 1998. The Heat had another great regular season in 1997–98, ultimately finishing 55–27. Not much had changed from a year earlier heading into the 1998 Playoffs. Once again, the Heat were Atlantic Division Champions. Once again, they were the #2 seed in the East, with the Chicago Bulls, once again, holding the #1 seed. The New York Knicks were the #7 seed, which meant that the Heat would once again battle with their fiercest rival from the year before. Only this time, it would be in the first round, a best of five series. The two teams seemed evenly matched, with Miami taking Games 1 and 3 and New York taking Games 2 and 4. The most memorable moment of the series came at the conclusion of Game 4 when an altercation erupted between Alonzo Mourning and Larry Johnson. This is the fight in which Jeff Van Gundy infamously grabbed onto Mourning's leg in an attempt to intervene. More importantly, it resulted in Mourning being suspended for the deciding game of the series. Multiple Heat fans felt that Johnson, knowing the Knicks had already won Game 4, deliberately provoked Mourning with only a second left on the clock so that he would be suspended for the series-deciding game, in an attempt to not only give the Knicks extra leverage, but to avenge the suspensions from the previous year. Regardless of his intent, it worked, as the Heat were no match for the Knicks in Game 5 without their all-star captain and defensive centerpiece. New York took the series 3–2, pulling off a first round upset. After Mourning was ejected from Game 4, Riley was seen outside the visitors' room at Madison Square Garden, resting his hands on the wall and hanging his head down, contemplating the loss of Mourning for Game 5.

After a devastating upset loss to the Knicks in the 1998 Playoffs, the Heat immediately geared up for the 1998–99 season. with Michael Jordan, Scottie Pippen and Phil Jackson all leaving Chicago, the Heat were considered major contenders to claim the top spot in the east. However, just a few weeks into the offseason, a massive lockout began, and it became unclear whether there would even be a 1998–99 season. This was the first work stoppage in NBA history that resulted in missed games. Several months passed and everything remained up in the air. Finally, in January 1999, the National Basketball Association and the National Basketball Players Association reached an agreement on a new collective bargaining agreement. All teams played a shortened 50-game regular season schedule beginning on February 9 with very limited days off.

Despite the grueling schedule, the Heat emphatically lived up to expectations during the 50-game season, claiming the 1st seed in the East just as they were favored to. Alonzo Mourning in particular had a great season, leading the league in blocks and winning Defensive Player of the Year. He was also named as the Center for the All-NBA First Team (beating out Shaquille O'Neal) and was the runner-up for NBA Most Valuable Player, with Karl Malone winning the award. Had Mourning won MVP over Malone, he would have joined Michael Jordan and Hakeem Olajuwon as the only players to win MVP and Defensive Player of the Year in the same season. Miami would have a conference-best 33–17 record to claim their first-ever No. 1 seed in the NBA playoffs. In the first round, they were once again matched against their rivals, the New York Knicks, who had struggled through the 50-game season and barely slipped into the playoffs with the #8 seed.

During the first four games, the Knicks took Games 1 and 3, and the Heat took Games 2 and 4, the exact opposite of the year before. For the third year in a row, it came down to one final, deciding game at the Miami Arena. The Heat led throughout the entire 4th Quarter and appeared to be closing in on avenging the previous year's loss, but the Knicks managed to cut the deficit to 1. With only a few seconds left in the game, Terry Porter had Latrell Sprewell trapped on the baseline and Miami was on the verge of narrowly escaping. Porter took a stab at the ball, and it went out of bounds, but the officials declared it was still New York's ball. After Porter had Sprewell trapped with only a few seconds left, the Knicks now had another chance to inbound the ball and attempt a game-winning shot. Charlie Ward inbounded to Allan Houston, who immediately dribbled through a massive gap and put up a floater. The ball bounced off the rim, onto the backboard, back onto the rim, and fell in. The Knicks had pulled off one of the greatest upsets in NBA history, becoming just the second #8 seed to knock off a #1 seed in the playoffs. For the second year in a row, the Heat were stopped dead in their tracks by the Knicks who would go on to become the first 8 seed to make the NBA Finals.

=== 1999–2000: Final loss to New York ===
After three failed attempts at a championship run and two consecutive seasons of first round-heartbreak against the determined Knicks, the Heat looked forward to the 1999–2000 season. In preparation for the new season and new millennium, the franchise underwent change, taking a new set of uniforms which are still used today. The logo was updated, as well, and on New Year's Day 2000, the Heat were to play their first game in the brand new American Airlines Arena (later FTX Center, then Miami-Dade Arena, and currently Kaseya Center). Once again, the Heat showed tremendous promise in the regular season, starting off 15–4 while still playing at Miami Arena. On January 2, 2000, the Miami Heat defeated the Orlando Magic in the first game ever played at American Airlines Arena. The Heat finished 52–30, earning their fourth straight division title and the 2nd seed in the East. Mourning led the league in blocked shots and repeated as Defensive Player of the Year. Mourning and Hardaway brought the Heat to the playoffs for the fifth straight year, but Hardaway suffered an injury that kept him from competing.

In the first round, they met the #7 seeded Detroit Pistons. Even without Tim Hardaway, Miami won the series 3–0, the first sweep in franchise history. This brought the Heat to the conference semifinals against the Knicks, battling with New York for the fourth consecutive postseason. The series began in Miami, with Hardaway returning to the starting lineup, but it was Mourning's 26 points that took a Game 1 victory. The Knicks evened the series with a six-point Game 2 win in Miami. Game 3 was at Madison Square Garden, with the Heat winning in overtime. As the series continued, the Knicks would win Game 4 and the Heat took Game 5, taking a 3–2 series lead. However, the Knicks won Game 6, forcing a deciding 7th game in Miami. The Heat had control of the game with a minute to go, but Mourning went for a steal on Ewing, when he could have forced a tougher shot; it allowed Ewing to dunk, bringing the Knicks ahead by one. Following a timeout with seven seconds to play, Mourning gave the ball to Mashburn, thinking that Mashburn would make the shot. However, Mashburn was double-teamed by Ewing and Childs, so he threw it to Clarence Weatherspoon. After dribbling passed his defender, Weatherspoon pulled up for a jump shot, but the ball bounced off the backboard; New York won the game by one point.

== 2000–2003: Pre-Wade years ==
After being knocked out of the playoffs by the Knicks in the series-deciding game for the third straight season, Pat Riley decided it was time for the Heat to undergo some changes. After losing out to the Orlando Magic to get Toronto Raptors swingman Tracy McGrady, Miami decided to trade Brown and Mashburn to the Charlotte Hornets (among others) in exchange for Eddie Jones, Anthony Mason and Ricky Davis. Miami also picked up Brian Grant to go along with the core of Mourning, Hardaway, Majerle, Bruce Bowen and Anthony Carter. That summer, Alonzo Mourning and Tim Hardaway traveled to Sydney, Australia to be part of the second Olympic "dream team" that would eventually win the gold medal, making them the first two Heat players to ever win Olympic gold medals.

Unfortunately, the elation soon turned to fear. On the plane ride home from the Olympics, Mourning noticed that his legs were very badly swollen. Upon getting a physical the next day at the start of training camp, it was discovered that Mourning had a chronic kidney disease: Focal segmental glomerulosclerosis. On October 16, 2000, it was announced that Alonzo would not play in the 2000–2001 season. The Heat missed Mourning for 69 games in 2000–01, yet found success with Grant, Jones and Mason, the latter of whom was named to his first All-Star game. Led by Hardaway, the Heat embarked on yet another winning season, with a 50–32 record, earning the 3rd seed in the Eastern Conference. With 13 games remaining, Mourning surprisingly returned to the Heat's lineup on March 27, 2001, against the Toronto Raptors. He would make the game-winning dunk several weeks later against the Milwaukee Bucks. With their full lineup intact for the first time all year, the Heat were qualifying for the playoffs for the sixth straight season. The Heat met the 6th seeded Charlotte Hornets in the first round, the same team they had traded Mashburn and Brown to the previous summer. Despite having the better regular season record, the Heat were absolutely obliterated by the Hornets. Charlotte took the first two games in Miami by 26 each, before closing out the series on their home floor by 15. Mourning in particular was a shell of his former, MVP-candidate self. This loss marked the end of the Mourning-Hardaway era that had started five years earlier, leaving the franchise in a state of flux.

The following two seasons were among the worst in Heat history. Riley missed the playoffs for the first time in his coaching career, and much of the remaining core from the division-title winning Heat teams of the late 1990s departed (Tim Hardaway, Bruce Bowen and Dan Majerle). Miami rounded out its 2001–02 season roster with players well past their prime such as Rod Strickland, Chris Gatling, Jim Jackson, LaPhonso Ellis and Kendall Gill along with Mourning, Jones, Grant and Carter, whom the Heat signed to a controversial three-year deal that some said was far too much for the young guard. And to acquire Gatling, Riley and the Heat traded away Ricky Davis, a young, promising player. The trade drew a lot of criticism at the time. The Heat also signed two young, undrafted players in Malik Allen and Mike James to make up for not having a first-round pick in the draft. Miami also signed Vladimir Stepania to back up Mourning at center. The veteran team narrowly missed the playoffs, despite having a losing record at 36–46.

Miami began to rebuild in 2002–03. They drafted Caron Butler in the first round and Rasual Butler (no relation to Caron) in the second round of the 2002 NBA Draft. Mourning missed the entire season due to his condition worsening and Eddie Jones also missed a huge portion of the season with an ankle injury. Miami signed Travis Best to be the starting point guard. The Heat was led by Caron Butler and a number of the youthful players that have filled out the Heat's roster since 2000 including Eddie House, Carter, Stepania, Allen and James. The Heat finished 25–57 to end the 2002–2003 season as Riley stepped down as head coach and the team finished 7th in the Atlantic Division.

== 2003–2010: Dwyane Wade era ==
=== 2003–2004: Arrival of Dwyane Wade ===
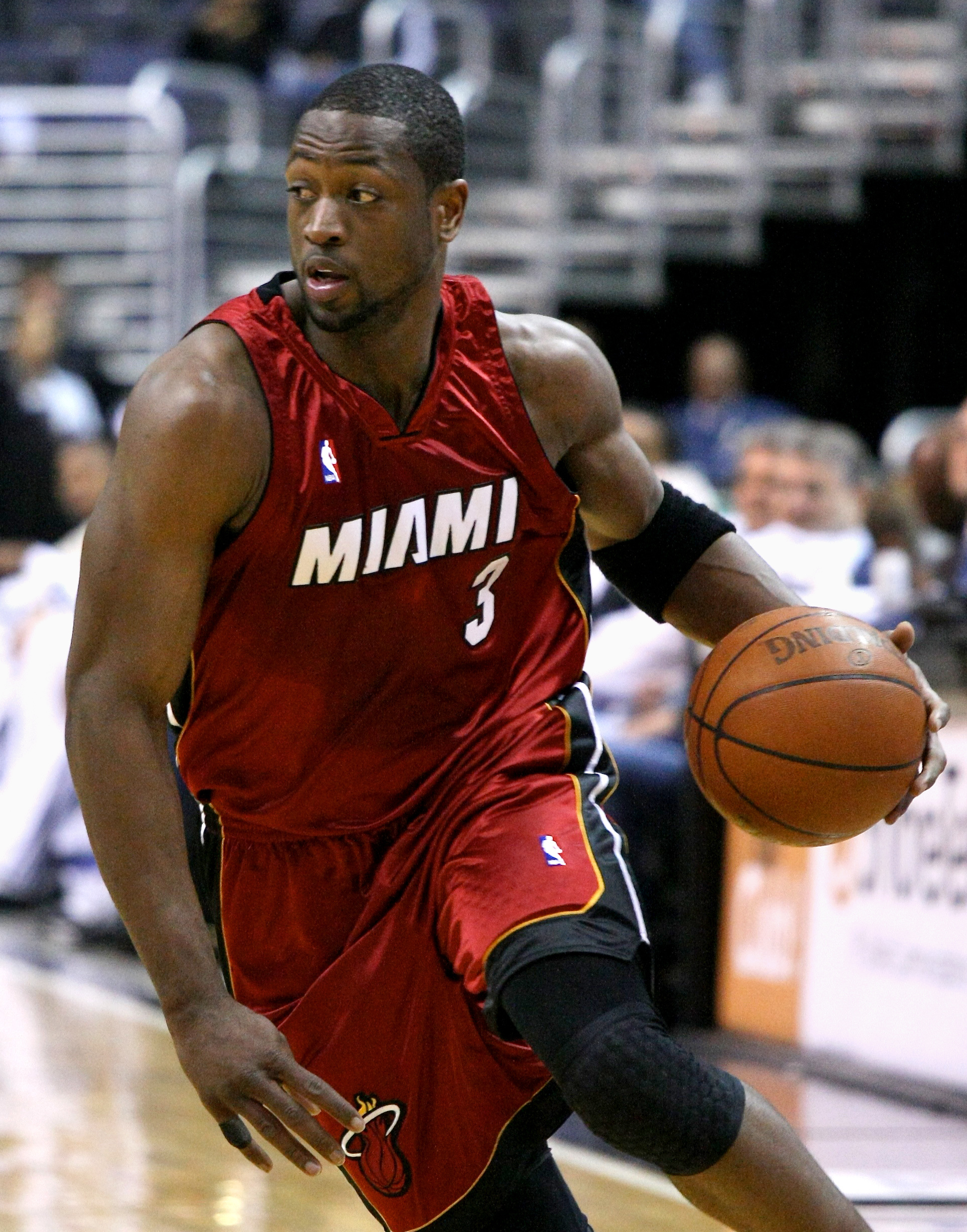
Dwyane Wade was drafted fifth overall by the Heat in 2003. He won the Finals MVP award in 2006.

Alonzo Mourning's huge contract expired the following summer, giving the Heat some much-needed cap room to rebuild. However, Miami was still a few million dollars away from signing a max contract player. On July 1, 2003, Miami was expecting to hear from Bill Duffy, agent for Anthony Carter, who was expected to make $4.1 million the upcoming season provided he exercised his option. Duffy's agency never informed the team and Miami was free from the contract. In addition, the season earlier, forward LaPhonso Ellis honorably rescinded a clause in his contract which would have forced the Heat to pay Ellis the following season, a burden the Heat could not afford to deal with in the rebuilding process.

With cap space, Miami targeted restricted free agent forward from the Los Angeles Clippers Elton Brand in free agency and presented him with an offer sheet worth $82 million over six years. However, Clippers team owner Donald Sterling matched Miami's offer. The Heat then presented a 6-year $63 million offer sheet to restricted free-agent forward Lamar Odom which the Clippers declined to match. Miami also signed free agent point guard Rafer Alston during his And 1 basketball fame. The Heat also opted to draft Dwyane Wade out of Marquette University with the 5th overall pick in the 2003 NBA draft instead of signing a large-scale free agent point guard such as Gilbert Arenas. The pick was somewhat surprising at the time, since it was expected that Miami would draft a true point guard rather than a shooting guard. Miami also signed Udonis Haslem out of the University of Florida, who went undrafted a season earlier. Odom, Alston, Haslem and Wade teamed up with Grant, Jones, Allen and both Butlers formed one of the most surprising teams of the season.

A few days before the start of the 2003–04 season, Riley stepped down as head coach to focus more on his role as team president, and promoted longtime assistant coach Stan Van Gundy to the head coaching position. The team was expected to be among the league's worst by NBA prognosticators. After dealing with early injury problems to Odom, Wade and both Butlers, the team jelled. The Heat's newcomers brought youth and energy to the team. Wade broke several rookie records while other Heat players revived their careers. Wade led the Heat over the New Orleans Hornets, the same team that had swept the Heat into rebuilding mode three seasons prior. Miami went on to lose to the Indiana Pacers 4–2 in the conference semifinals.

=== 2004–2005: Return to the conference finals ===
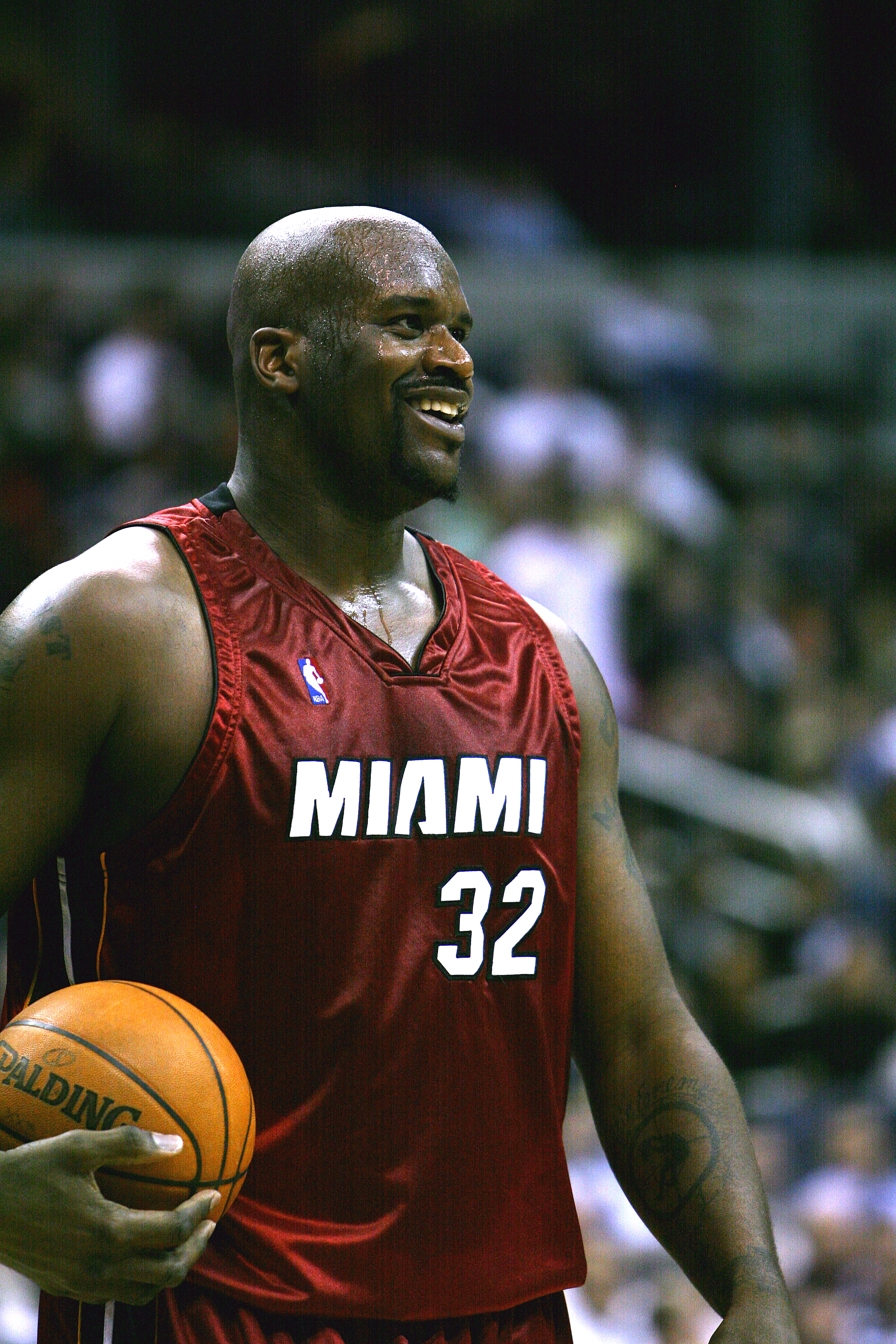
Shaquille O'Neal was acquired in a summer blockbuster involving Caron Butler, Lamar Odom and Brian Grant. He formed a power-duo with Wade.

After the promising 2003–04 season, Miami took major steps toward becoming a Championship franchise. They acquired superstar center Shaquille O'Neal on July 14, 2004, in a trade with the Los Angeles Lakers for Lamar Odom, Caron Butler and Brian Grant. Riley also tried to sign Karl Malone, but Malone decided to retire instead. Wade and O'Neal worked well as a pair. The season also reunited several former club members. Ron Rothstein, the Heat's inaugural head coach, became an assistant coach, Steve Smith rejoined the club and Alonzo Mourning was re-signed after being released from the Toronto Raptors following the Vince Carter trade in December.

The Heat achieved its third best record in franchise history: 59–23. They also had 14 consecutive victories, which remained a franchise record until the 2012–2013 season. They were seeded first in the playoffs, and swept through the first two rounds against New Jersey and Washington, advancing to the Eastern Conference finals against defending Champion Detroit. The teams split the first four games before Miami took an 88–76 victory in Game 5, but in the process lost Wade to a strained rib muscle which he suffered in an attempt to take a charge against Pistons forward Rasheed Wallace. With Wade out, the Heat lost 91–66 in Game 6 at Detroit, setting up Game 7 in Miami. Wade returned to play and the Heat held a six-point lead with three minutes remaining. A series of missed shots and turnovers ensued, that cost the Heat their first-ever finals game-7 in an 88–82 loss. Wade appeared to struggle to breathe throughout the game though he scored 20 points.

In the offseason, the Heat retooled. In what was to be the largest trade in NBA history, in a 5-team, 13-player transaction the Heat traded away Eddie Jones, Rasual Butler and Qyntel Woods and in exchange received former NBA All-Stars Antoine Walker, Jason Williams, and James Posey. Miami also signed former All-Star guard Gary Payton, former UCLA star Jason Kapono and first-round pick and NCAA All American Wayne Simien. Free agent Damon Jones opted for a bigger contract offered by the Cleveland Cavaliers. Critics were quick to debate whether a reformed Heat team would have chemistry issues, were too old (O'Neal, Mourning and Payton were all in their mid-thirties), or had too many underachievers (Walker had a reputation of miserable shot selection; Williams, one of turnover-prone playmaking). After an 11–10 start, with O'Neal already hurt, these critics seemed to have been proven right, ultimately in leading to Van Gundy stepping down from his coaching position.

=== 2005–2006: First championship win ===
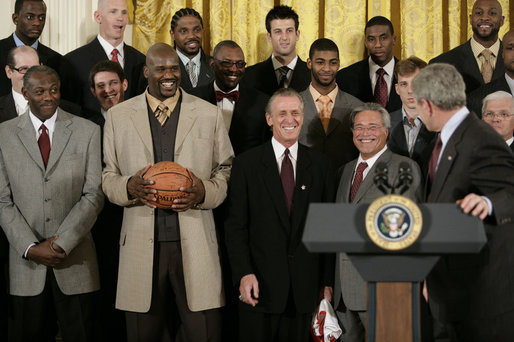
The Miami Heat visit the White House to celebrate their first championship title.

On December 12, 2005, Riley announced he would become head coach for the second time, after Van Gundy unexpectedly stepped down due to personal and family reasons. The team responded well to the coaching change, going 10–5 in the month of January. However, those five losses came to the defending champion San Antonio Spurs twice, the Phoenix Suns twice and the Dallas Mavericks once by a 36-point blowout, raising doubts over whether or not they could compete against the top teams. The months of February and March were very successful for the Heat, including a stretch of 15 wins in 16 games, which began with a comeback victory over the perennial Eastern Conference powerhouse Detroit Pistons. Wade and O'Neal helped the Heat finish with a 52–30 record, enough for the 2nd seed in the Eastern Conference. Their record was respectable but less impressive than their 2004–2005 record and 1st place playoff seeded season.

The Heat drew the seventh seed Chicago Bulls in the first-round. The Heat won the first two games at home, despite Udonis Haslem being ejected in the first game and suspended for the second for throwing his mouthpiece in the direction of the referee. The team lost games three and four in Chicago but bounced back to win game five at home. By winning game six in Chicago, the Heat won the series and went on to face the New Jersey Nets in the second round. The Heat lost Game 1 at home but won the next four to oust the Nets from the playoffs for the second year in a row. The Heat advanced to their second Eastern Conference finals in as a number of years. They opened up the 2006 Eastern Conference finals in Detroit, in a rematch of the previous year's Eastern Conference finals. The Heat stole home court advantage by winning Game 1. Although Miami lost the second game 92–88 (despite a near comeback after trailing by eighteen). Home for the next two games, they won both Game 3 (98–83) and Game 4 (89–78) to take a 3–1 series lead. The Pistons then won Game 5 in The Palace of Auburn Hills, but the Heat answered by winning Game 6 and advanced to their first NBA Finals in franchise history against Dirk Nowitzki's Dallas Mavericks, who were also in their first NBA Finals.

The Heat lost the first two games in Dallas convincingly. Wade led the Heat to a comeback win in Game 3, capped by a Gary Payton 18-footer with nine seconds left, in a game the Heat trailed by as many as 13 points. With their confidence regained the Heat blew out the Mavs in Game 4 and survived a Game 5 come-from-behind overtime thriller in which Wade put up 43 points and Payton again scoring the team's go-ahead field goal with one second left on the shot clock. With Pat Riley famously declaring "One suit, one shirt, one tie", the team went on to win Game 6 in Dallas, winning their first NBA championship. They became only the third team in NBA history to win the final series after being down 0–2, following the 1969 Boston Celtics and the 1977 Portland Trail Blazers. The Heat overcame a miserable start with a 14-point gap to wear down the Mavericks, and led by one point (49–48) at halftime. Again, Wade played a vital role, powering the Heat to a late lead. He was helped by five blocks by Alonzo Mourning (the Heat had over 10 team blocks in the game even though they were averaging a little over 2 blocks in the series) and clutch shooting by James Posey, who drained a three-pointer which put the Heat ahead by six with 3 minutes to go. The Mavericks were down three with a few seconds left after a pair of missed free-throws by Wade. However, Dallas would be put to rest after Wade captured the rebound, fittingly ending the game by tossing the ball in the air after a missed three-point shot attempt by Jason Terry. Wade would go on to win the Bill Russell NBA Finals Most Valuable Player Award.

The championship proved all the more poignant for Miami's veteran superstars Alonzo Mourning, Gary Payton, Jason Williams, and Antoine Walker who had never before won an NBA championship. Mourning and Payton both re-signed with the Heat for the 2006–07 season. The Championship marked the seventh title for Coach Riley (fifth as a head coach), and fourth for O'Neal, both of whom fulfilled promises to Miami (when Riley first came to Miami and said he "envisioned a parade on Biscayne Boulevard") and (when O'Neal first arrive he vowed to "bring the title home"). O'Neal also proclaimed during the Championship parade that they would win the NBA repeat, later clarifying this promise applied only if Wade were present and healthy for the ride through the playoffs.

=== 2006–2007: First round sweep ===
The Miami Heat started the 2006–2007 NBA season poorly. After raising their championship banner prior to the opening game against the Chicago Bulls, Chicago blew out Miami 108–66. This marked the worst home loss in the team's history, and the worst margin of defeat for a defending Champion (42 points) on opening day in NBA history. O'Neal played the first few games for the Heat, then missed over thirty with a right knee injury. Key members of the Heat's Championship run, Antoine Walker and Gary Payton, were finding themselves on the bench at the expense of Jason Kapono and Dorell Wright. The first half of the Heat's season was full of misfortune. Coach Riley took an indefinite leave, Wade briefly injured his right wrist, while James Posey and Walker were delisted after failing a body mass exam. Matters improved for the team. Rothstein, the Heat's original head coach, returned on an interim basis. Both Posey and Walker were reinstated. Former Heat star Eddie Jones re-signed with the team after being released by the Memphis Grizzlies. O'Neal returned to play in January. Riley resumed his duties as head coach at the start of the second half of the season.

On February 21, in a game against the Houston Rockets, Wade dislocated his left shoulder and left in a wheelchair. Shortly after the injury, Wade announced that he would opt for rehabilitation instead of surgery, with the hope of returning for the playoffs. The rehab was successful enough that he returned on April 9. Wade was rusty, and said that he did not have his "legs back yet." After Wade's injury, some predicted the Heat would fail even to make the playoffs. Those predictions were quickly dismissed as the Heat surged, winning 11 out of 14 games. In that time, Miami posted a nine-game winning streak (defeating such teams as the Pistons, Wizards, Bulls and Jazz), in addition to extending a home winning streak to 14. O'Neal was a primary cause for the Heat's resurgence, playing his best basketball of the season and serving as a focal point of the offense. Having a roster full of veterans and former All-Stars also had a notable benefit in dealing with the loss of Wade. Miami was able to post a 16–7 record without him and were able to win a third consecutive Southeast Division title.

Shortly after Wade returned, O'Neal's grandfather died, causing him to miss two games. Additionally, Udonis Haslem and Gary Payton were injured. The Heat finished the regular season with a 44–38 record, good for the Southeast division title, and faced the Chicago Bulls in the first round of the 2007 NBA Playoffs. However, hopes of a title defense immediately vanished as Chicago, who had home court due to a better regular season record, swept Miami 4–0 in the best of seven series. As a result, Miami became the first defending champion since 2000 to lose in the first round, including being the first defending champion since 1957 to be eliminated from the first round in a sweep. It was also the first four-game playoff series sweep suffered in Miami Heat history.

=== 2007–2008: Overhauling the roster ===
After a disappointing 2006–07 season, the Heat looked to move forward. Miami retained the 20th and 39th picks in the 2007 NBA Draft. On June 28, 2007, the Miami Heat selected Colorado State forward Jason Smith with the 20th overall selection then traded him to the Philadelphia 76ers for the draft rights to the 21st overall selection, guard Daequan Cook from Ohio State, and cash considerations. With the 39th overall selection, the Miami Heat drafted Stanko Barać, a center from Bosnia, but later traded his rights to the Indiana Pacers for a future second-round pick. The Heat lost Jason Kapono to the Toronto Raptors and James Posey to the Boston Celtics. The Heat got a much-needed point guard when they picked up Smush Parker from free agency and signed him to a three-year deal. They also signed veteran guard Penny Hardaway, reuniting the Shaq-Penny duo from the Orlando Magic teams of the mid-90s. Hardaway was later waived in December. He would never play in the NBA again. Also in the 2007 off-season, the Miami Heat made a five-player trade with the Minnesota Timberwolves, bringing back Ricky Davis and Mark Blount. Leaving the Heat were Antoine Walker, Wayne Simien, Michael Doleac, and a conditional first-round pick. Davis was on the Heat in August 2000 but fell out of favor with Riley. When the trade occurred he became a more polished scorer and was projected to have been a third option for the Heat to complement Dwyane Wade and Shaquille O'Neal, had the circumstances of the season turned out differently.

On December 19, 2007, during the first quarter of the game versus the Atlanta Hawks while getting back on a fast-break, Alonzo Mourning tore the patellar tendon in his right knee and was required to undergo season-ending knee surgery. On February 5, 2008, ESPN reported that the Heat were interested in trading center Shaquille O'Neal, contrary to reports by Pat Riley one month earlier that the Heat was not interested in trading the 13-time all-star. The next day however, the Heat agreed to trade O'Neal to the Phoenix Suns for Shawn Marion and Marcus Banks, effectively ending the Wade-O'Neal era. The Heat clinched the worst record in the NBA at 15–67 (.183). Late in the season, with the Heat well out of any type of realistic playoff contention, head coach Pat Riley missed two games because he went to scout certain NCAA basketball conference tournament games, to prepare in the likely event that the Heat received the number 1 or 2 pick in the 2008 draft.

It was announced on March 10, 2008, that Heat guard Dwyane Wade would be inactive for the rest of the season to help him rehabilitate his ailing knee and shoulder that he had re-aggravated, in hopes of playing in the 2008 Olympic Games in Beijing. It was announced on March 10 that the Heat waived guard Smush Parker, opening the opportunity to add a player signed to a 10-day contract. On March 12, 2008, they signed Bobby Jones to a 10-day contract, looking for help at the shooting guard and small forward positions. At the end of March 2008, the Heat posted the third-lowest point total in the history of the NBA during the shot clock era during a 96–54 loss to the Toronto Raptors on March 19, followed by a new record for the fewest made baskets with seventeen, in another lost game against the Boston Celtics on March 30. The Heat finished the season on a positive note on April 16 to close out the season with a 113–99 victory over the playoff-bound Atlanta Hawks. On April 28, 2008, Pat Riley stepped down as the head coach of the Heat, but remained team president. He replaced himself with longtime assistant coach Erik Spoelstra, who at 37, became the youngest head coach in the NBA. Riley finished his career with 1,210 victories, third all-time behind Lenny Wilkens and Don Nelson.

=== 2008–2010: Rebuilding ===
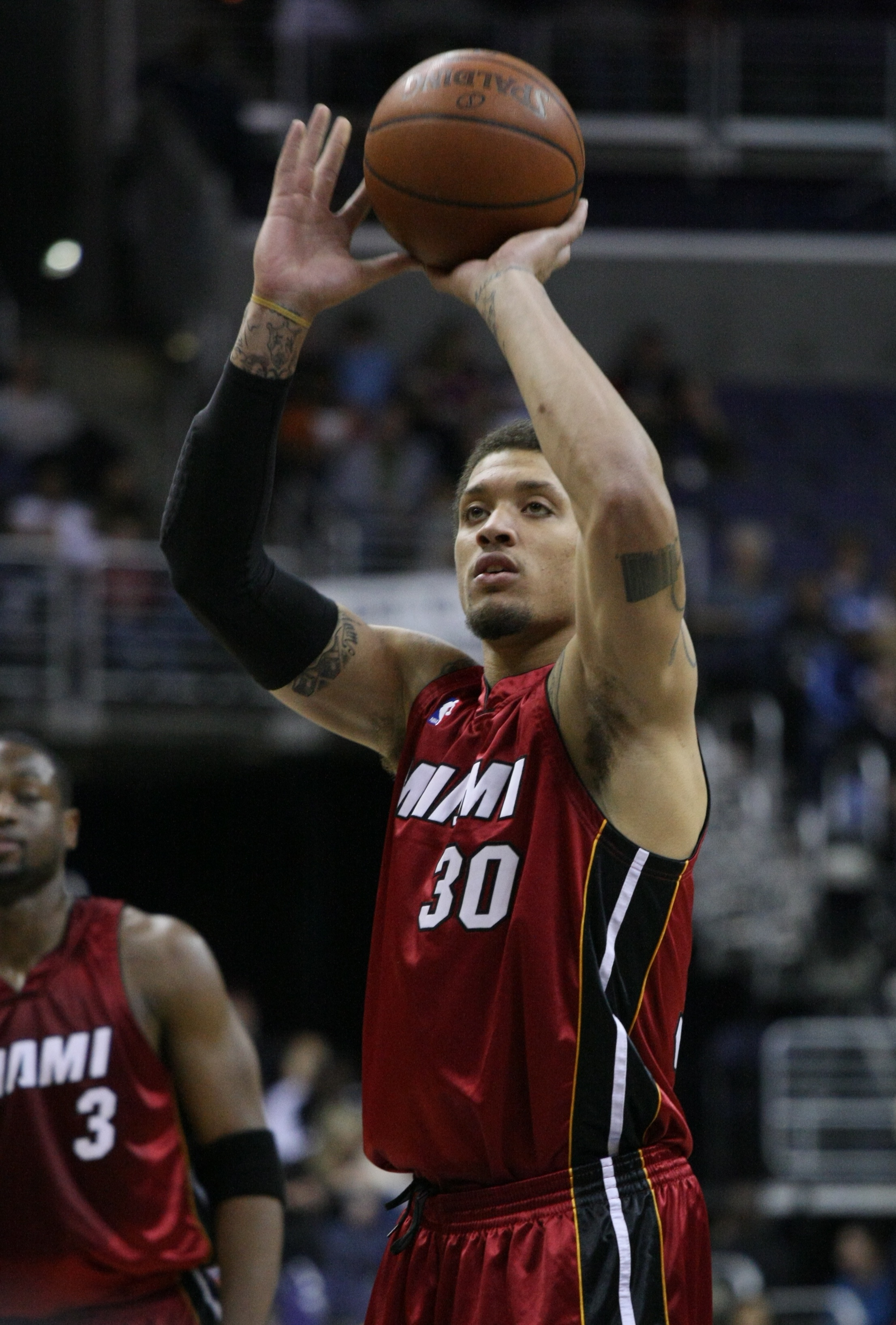
Michael Beasley was the Heat's highest ever draft pick (2nd overall) in the 2008 NBA draft.

On May 20, 2008, the Heat obtained the number 2 pick in the 2008 NBA draft as a result of the 2008 NBA draft lottery. They were expected to select power forward Michael Beasley or guard O. J. Mayo. Immediately following the draft lottery, Pat Riley suggested the team would listen to any trade offers for the second overall pick. However, he did stress the right offer would have to be made in order for the Heat to even consider such a trade (e.g., the Kevin Garnett trade to Boston from the 2007 offseason). On June 26, 2008, the Bulls selected Rose as expected, leaving the Heat to select Beasley. In the second round, with the 52nd overall pick, the Heat chose Kansas forward Darnell Jackson. Somewhat unexpectedly, it was announced that the Heat agreed to trade the lesser two of their three 2009 second-round draft picks to the Minnesota Timberwolves in exchange for the draft rights of talented Kansas guard Mario Chalmers, who helped lead Kansas to the NCAA championship, including making a three-point shot that sent the game to overtime. It was also later announced that Darnell Jackson's draft rights were traded to the Cleveland Cavaliers in exchange for the lesser of their two second-round picks in 2009. In early July, the free agent period began and with limited cap space the Heat signed local James Jones as the team's three-point specialist. Along with the acquisition of Yakhouba Diawara and Jamaal Magloire the Heat added depth and experience to their roster. In September 2008, Randy Pfund stepped down as general manager, elevating Pat Riley to that position. Four days later, the Miami Heat signed point guard Shaun Livingston, a former L.A Clipper. On November 5, 2008, 2nd-round draft pick and rookie Mario Chalmers of the Heat set a new franchise record of 9 steals in the game against the Philadelphia 76ers. That exceeded the old record set by Tim Hardaway for the most steals in the Heat's 21-year history. On February 13, 2009, the Heat traded Shawn Marion and Marcus Banks to the Toronto Raptors for center Jermaine O'Neal and forward Jamario Moon. Miami had been rumored to be pursuing O'Neal, as well as Amar'e Stoudemire and Carlos Boozer. The trade was meant to address the team's lack of a low post presence. On April 3, 2009, the Miami Heat clinched a playoff spot with a win over the Charlotte Bobcats. The Heat became the first team since the 1968–69 San Diego Rockets to go from 15 wins to the playoffs in one year (finished 43–39). They were eliminated in seven games by the fourth seed Atlanta Hawks in the first round. However, Dwyane Wade led the league in scoring with 30.2 points per game, becoming the first franchise player to do so.

The Heat started the 2009–10 season by going 7–1 through their first 8 games, but were inconsistent the rest of the way, and were at 35–34 through the first 69 games. On January 5, 2010, the Heat traded Chris Quinn to the New Jersey Nets for a 2012 second draft pick which allowed the team to sign recently released guard Rafer Alston. The team picked up the pace late, going 12–1 in the final 13 games to earn the 5th seed in the East, finishing 47–35 and making an improvement for the second consecutive season. The Heat lost in five games in the first round of the Eastern Conference playoffs against the Boston Celtics. The Heat finished the season ranking 15th in the NBA in total attendance with 726,935.

== 2010–2014: The Big Three era ==
Dwyane Wade, Chris Bosh, & LeBron James

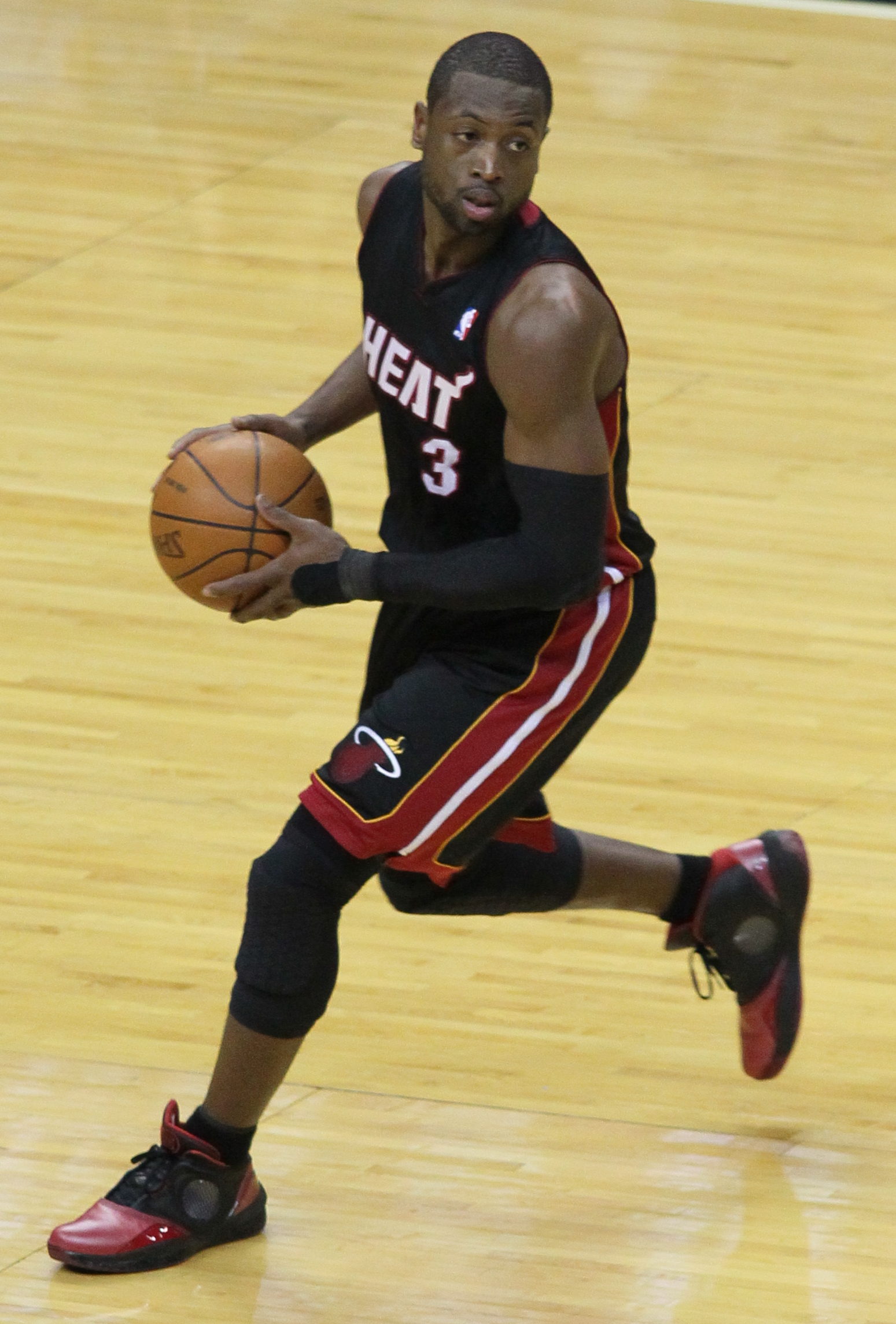
Dwyane Wade

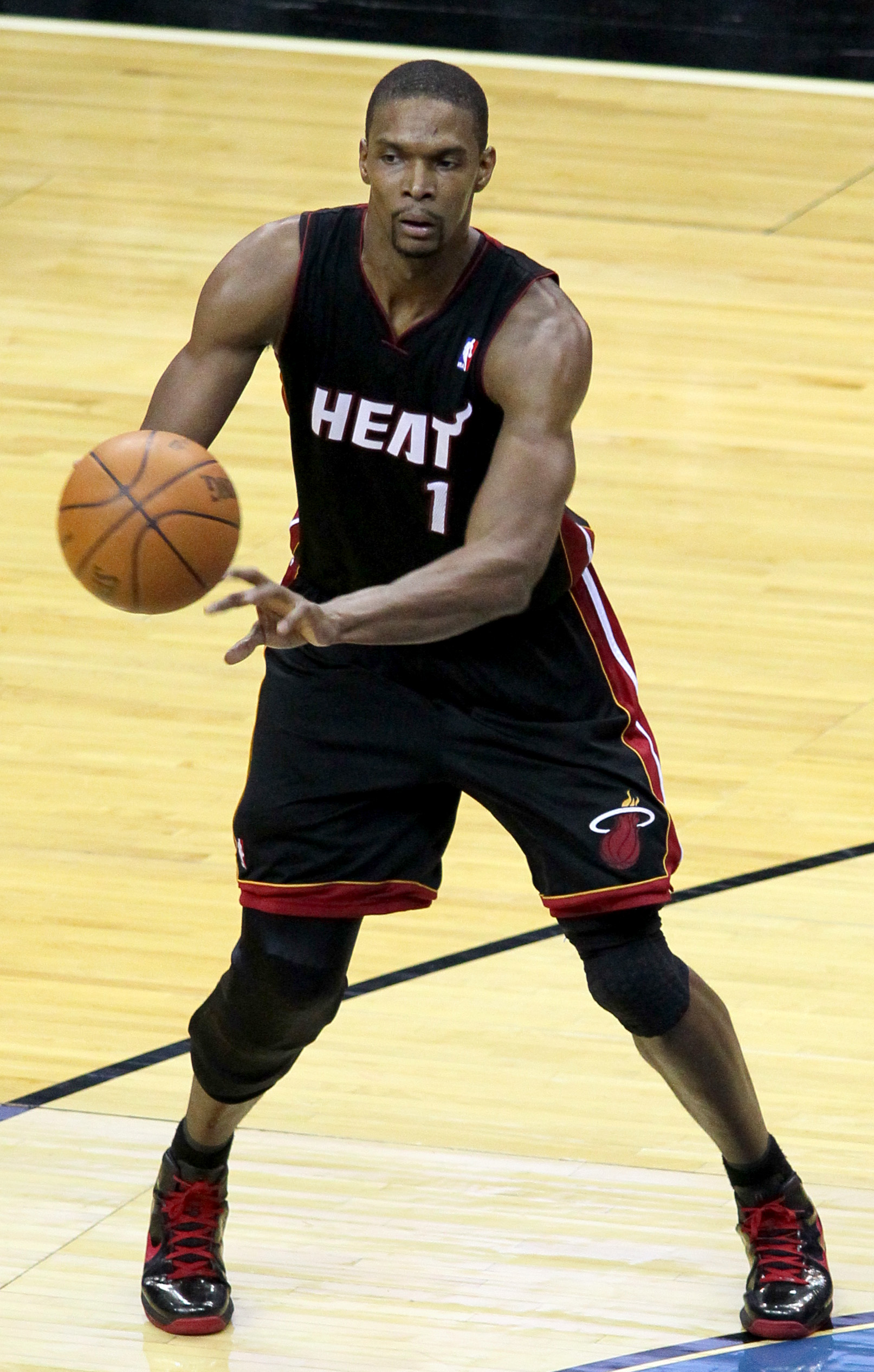
Chris Bosh

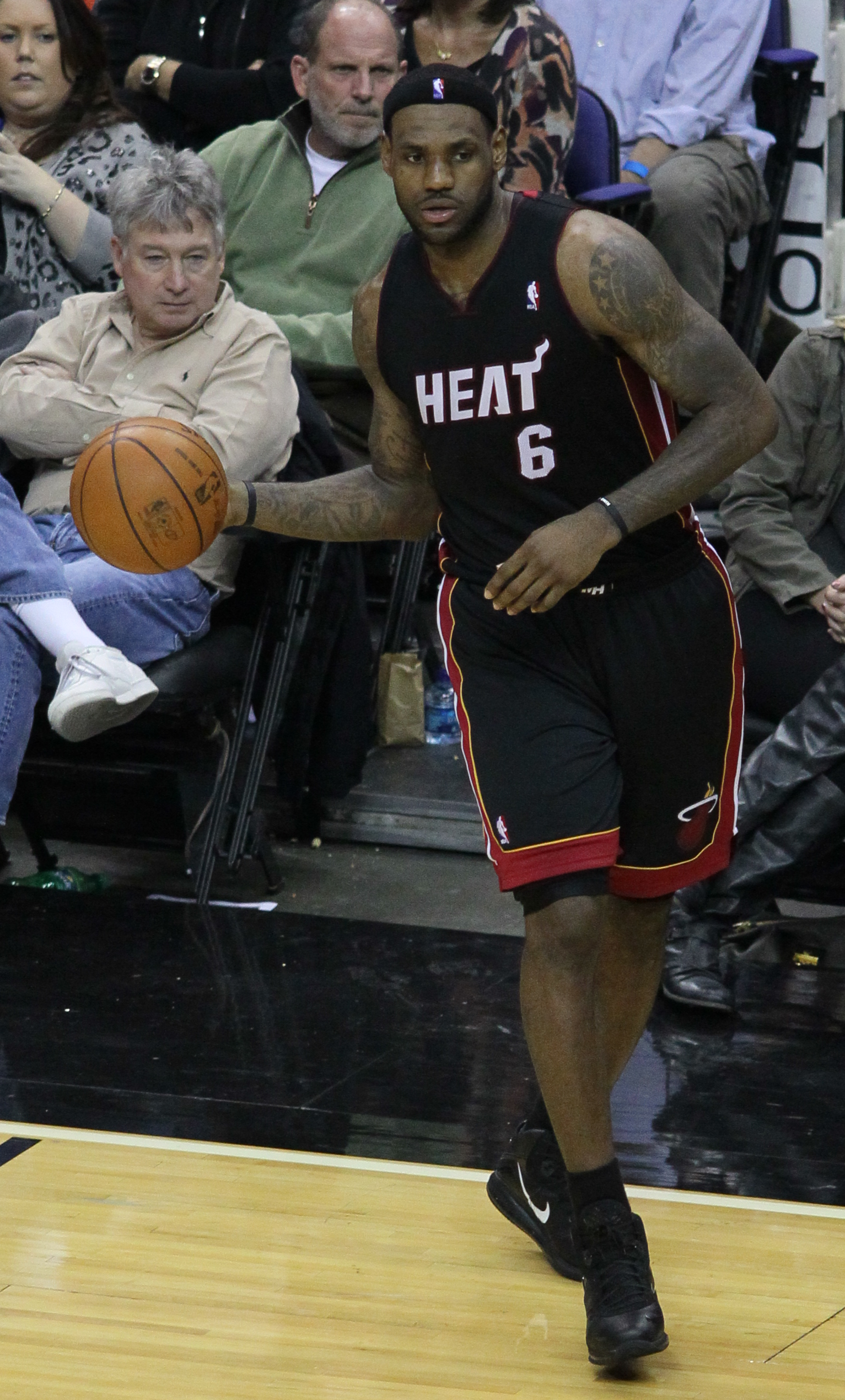
LeBron James

Entering the 2010–2011 season with nearly $48 million in salary cap space, the Heat caused a major power shift during the blockbuster 2010 NBA Free Agency, adding both Chris Bosh and LeBron James with local superstar Dwyane Wade, whom they had re-signed to a six-year, $107.59 million contract. During his infamous Decision, broadcast on ESPN, James announced he would take his "talents to South Beach and join the Miami Heat", which triggered a volatile fusillade of anger, primarily from Cleveland fans; Cavaliers' owner Dan Gilbert released an over-the-top letter that reeked of bitterness, as he claimed that Cleveland would win a championship before James would. Later that evening, the Heat announced the trade of Michael Beasley to the Minnesota Timberwolves for a pair of second round picks and cash considerations. On July 9, the Heat completed sign-and-trade deals, sending a total of four future first-round and two second-round picks to the Raptors for Bosh and to the Cavs for James (signing 6 years and $110.1 million contracts each). Heralded as a "Big 3", Wade, James and Bosh made their debut at the 2010 Summer Heat Welcome Party at the American Airlines Arena, where they were introduced as The Three Kings by Heat play-by-play announcer and event co-host Eric Reid. James predicted a dynasty for the Heat and alluded to multiple championships: "Not two, not three, not four, not five, not six, not seven". Howard Beck of The New York Times described the national fan reaction to the party: "Everyone saw something: greatness, arrogance, self-indulgence, boldness, cowardice, pride, friendship, collusion, joy, cynicism, heroes, mercenaries."

=== 2010–2011: Losing the Finals ===
At the beginning of the season, some considered the Heat as the team to break the single season record of 72 regular season victories set by the Chicago Bulls. On the opening game of the season, broadcast on the TNT Network and featuring the debut of James and Bosh in Heat uniforms, the game was the most-watched NBA contest ever on cable television.

After losing opening game 88–80, the Heat got off to a 9–8 start. Much of the speculation was that Spoelstra could lose his job and that Heat president Pat Riley would return as coach. However, after a "players only" meeting, the team pulled together a 12-game win streak (10 of them by double digits) and limited the opposition under 100 points in all those games. On January 27, 2011, via fan voting, Dwyane Wade (guard) and LeBron James (forward) were selected to be starters for the Eastern Conference at the All-Star Game. A few days later, forward Chris Bosh was selected as a reserve. During the regular season, they lost each game against the Chicago Bulls, an Eastern Conference rival. However, after dropping the first three games against the Boston Celtics, the Heat managed to defeat the Celtics in their fourth and final regular-season game in the 2010–2011 season.

Towards the end of the regular season, the Heat were the 3rd Seed, trailing only Chicago and Boston. Fueled by a late-season steamroll, the Heat finished with a 58–24 record, third best in team history putting them up to the second seed, behind the top-seeded, 62-win Bulls, led by MVP Derrick Rose. In the much anticipated 2011 NBA Playoffs, Miami defeated the Philadelphia 76ers in the first round, Boston Celtics in the conference semifinals, and Bulls in the conference finals, all in 5 games. The Heat reached the 2011 NBA Finals for the first time since 2006, in a rematch against the Dallas Mavericks. After taking a 2–1 series lead, the Heat collapsed, as they would lose the final three games to the Mavericks. The majority of the criticism fell on LeBron James, as the loss was seen as a consequence for his actions during the offseason. James struggled in the Finals, averaged only 3 points in fourth quarters in the series. James' scoring average of 17.8 points per game during the Finals signified an 8.9-point drop from his 26.7 points per game average during the regular season, the largest such drop-off in league history. He also contributed 6.8 assists and 7.1 rebounds per game, and averaged 23.6 points, 8.3 rebounds, and 5.8 assists per game for the postseason as a whole.

=== 2011–2012: Second championship win ===
During the off-season, the Bulls drafted Norris Cole 28th overall in the 2011 NBA Draft, but in a series of draft night deals, his rights were subsequently traded to the Minnesota Timberwolves, who then dealt him to the Heat. After the second NBA Lockout ended, the Heat would improve their roster by signing veteran Shane Battier. In the shortened 2011–12 season, the Heat got off to a 27–7 start, and for the second year in a row, LeBron James, Dwyane Wade and Chris Bosh were selected to the NBA All-Star Game. However, they would struggle for the second half of the season going 19–13. The Heat finished 46–20, earning the second seed in the east for the NBA Playoffs. Entering the first round, they took a 3–0 lead against the New York Knicks, but like their previous series with the Sixers, were not able to close them out in Game 4. A victory in Game 5 ultimately defeated New York, and the Heat advanced to the second round versus the Indiana Pacers. In a Game 1 home victory, Chris Bosh went down with a lower abdominal strain injury, and was proclaimed to miss out on the rest of the Indiana series. After losing Game 2 at home and Game 3 at Indiana, some criticized Dwyane Wade's lackluster performance in Game 3, bringing attention to the fact that he got into a verbal argument with Spoelstra. However, with Wade visiting his former college coach, the team overcame adversity and defeated the Pacers in the next three games, with James and Wade often combining for an average of 70 points to close out the Pacers. They met the Boston Celtics in the Eastern Conference finals, taking the first two games, before losing the next three, including one home loss where Bosh returned from the injury. However, on June 7, they took a big road win at Boston beating the Celtics 98–79 to tie the series 3–3; James had a remarkable 45 points and 15 rebounds. The deciding Game 7 was at Miami; although the Celtics largely dominated during the first half, the second half saw several lead changes as both teams went back and forth. The Heat eventually won 101–88, reaching the NBA Finals for the second straight year. In the much anticipated match-up with the Oklahoma City Thunder, the Heat split the first two games, winning Game 2 on the road, before sweeping the next three at home. James was named the Finals MVP as he won his first NBA championship. The Heat became the first NBA team to win the Finals despite trailing in three different series beforehand (1–2 with Indiana, 2–3 with Boston and 0–1 with OKC). In addition, the Heat once again swept Games 3, 4 and 5 at home (becoming only the third team to do so) on their way to their second championship.

=== 2012–2013: Third Championship, Ray Allen's shot, and the win streak ===
On July 11, 2012, the Heat officially signed veterans Ray Allen to a three-year deal and Rashard Lewis to a two-year deal. After releasing Terrel Harris and Josh Harrellson, Miami signed Jarvis Varnado and Chris Andersen for the remainder of the season to bolster the defense. Miami became the third team to field three All-Stars (Wade, James and Bosh) in at least three consecutive seasons; the fourth such occurrence in league history after the 1980s Lakers and Celtics, and the 2008–2011 Celtics.

Along the way, the Heat achieved individual milestones. On November 21, 2012, against Milwaukee, Udonis Haslem became the first un-drafted player to lead a franchise in rebounding, after passing the previous record held by Alonzo Mourning. On January 12, 2013, against Sacramento, Mario Chalmers had a career-high 10-triples, tying Brian Shaw's record for most three-pointers in a single game. Four days later against Golden State, LeBron James became the youngest player in NBA history to score 20,000 career-points and made his 5,000th career assist.

On February 3, 2013 (Day of Super Bowl XLVII), the Heat embarked on a winning streak, after winning over the Toronto Raptors. Eight days later against Portland, LeBron James broke Moses Malone and Adrian Dantley's record of six straight 30 point games on 60% shooting. The 117–104 win was also the Heat's 1000th regular season win in franchise history. On February 21, 2013, Miami forced 27 turnovers from the Chicago Bulls, the most suffered by Chicago since the 28 turnovers against the Washington Wizards in December 2004. With a win against the Sacramento Kings on February 26, 2013, Miami extended their winning streak to 12 straight, tying for their highest point total ever at 141. LeBron James became the first player to shoot 64% FG on at least 200 attempts in a month since Kareem Abdul-Jabbar in March 1983. Following consecutive wins against the Memphis Grizzlies and New York Knicks, the Heat tied their franchise record for longest win streak at 14, first set in the 2004–05 season. A win against the Indiana Pacers extended the streak to 18, marking the first time the Heat has ever defeated all 29 teams in a single season. Dwyane Wade became the first guard since Michael Jordan in 1995–96 to score 20-plus with 50 percent-plus shooting in 11 straight games. Chris Bosh, though averaging a career low in minutes played, was having his most efficient shooting percentage to date, at over 51%. The winning streak continued on March 18, where they defeated the Boston Celtics five years to the day that the Celtics snapped the Houston Rockets' 22-game win streak, coming back from a 17-point deficit in the game. Two nights later, the Heat overcame a 27-point deficit late in the third quarter to defeat the Cleveland Cavaliers and push the streak to 24. Two nights later, the Heat beat the Detroit Pistons and hit the 25 mark, which caused the Pistons to hit their tenth loss in row. On March 24, the Heat took on the Charlotte Bobcats at home and easily got win number 26. The following night, the Heat went to Amway Center to play the Magic as it marked the second consecutive game without shooting guard Dwyane Wade due to a sore right knee; they chalked up their 27th in a row.

The streak would end on March 27, when the Chicago Bulls would beat the Heat 101–97 in Chicago. Nevertheless, in that game against the Bulls, Wade blocked his 50th shot of the season. It's his eighth straight season with 50 or more blocks. The only other guard with that milestone is Michael Jordan. On March 31, with a game-winning 3-point shot by Chris Bosh against the San Antonio Spurs, the Heat became the first team in the NBA to win 17 games in a single month. That win was also the second time the Heat had swept the season series against the Spurs. The first time was during the 1996–1997 "Road Warriors" stint. A win against the Washington Wizards on April 10 set a new franchise record of 62 wins. They achieved this without the Big 3 playing in the game. On April 14, they exacted revenge against the Bulls with a 105–93 victory, marking a new franchise record of home wins at 36–4. With a game-saving block by Norris Cole, the Heat's win against the Cavaliers sealed the season record of 15–1 on the second night of a back to back, tying with the Dallas Mavericks of the 2007–08 season. Defeating Orlando at the season finale set the franchise record for 66 wins in a season. By the end of the season, the Heat won 18 of last 19 road Gs, the best streak on the road to end a season in the history of the NBA. The Heat went 17–1 in March, becoming the first team to win 17 games in a single calendar month in NBA history. After the All Star Break, the Heat went on a 40–2 run, the greatest stretch around that length of games in NBA history. Only 2 approach it, as the Chicago Bulls started the 1995–96 season 41–3 before losing two straight, and the Dallas Mavericks had a 38–2 run during the 2006–07 season before losing two in a row. With a win in Game 7 against the Indiana Pacers, Miami became the first Eastern Conference team to reach the NBA Finals in three straight years since the Chicago Bulls in the late 1990s. The Heat concluded their season with a 66–16 regular season record, the top seed in both the Eastern Conference and the entire league.

Miami lost Game 1 of the Finals on their home floor in a close game that was decided by a last minute buzzer beater by Tony Parker. The Heat went on to win Game 2 with a 33–5 run in the second half and a monstrous block by LeBron James on Tiago Splitter being highlights of the game. The Spurs responded by defeating the Heat in a 113–77 rout on their home floor in San Antonio, where the Spurs set a record for most 3-pointers made in a single Finals game with 16 made 3's. The two teams continued to trade wins leading up to Game 6 where the Spurs, up 10 heading in the 4th quarter, were in position to close out the series and win the championship. James went on to score 16 points in the period, outscoring the entire Spurs squad by himself at one point, and put his team back into position to win. The Spurs were up 5 with 28 seconds left in the 4th quarter when James cut it to 2 with a timely 3-pointer. Thanks to Kawhi Leonard missing a key free throw on the other end, the game remained a one-possession game. With 5 seconds left in regulation, Ray Allen hit a 3-pointer to send the game into overtime where Chris Bosh made a game-saving block on Danny Green's 3-point shot attempt, the Heat defeated the Spurs 103–100. The game is considered one of the greatest in Finals history. Some refer to Game 6 as the "No Headband Game" due to James losing his trademark headband before going on his monstrous 4th quarter tear. The Heat went on to defeat the Spurs 95–88 in Game 7 behind a 37-point and 12 rebound performance from James and a 23-point and 10-rebound effort from Wade. Shane Battier also went off for 18 points behind 6–8 shooting from the 3-point line after having a horrible shooting slump the entire post-season up to that point. The Heat captured the NBA title once again for a second year in a row, becoming the first team in the Eastern Conference to repeat as league champions since the late 1990s Chicago Bulls. The series is widely considered as a classic. James was named the NBA Finals MVP, becoming the fifth player to win the award back-to-back along with Michael Jordan, Bill Russell, Kobe Bryant, Shaquille O'Neal, and Hakeem Olajuwon and only the second player in NBA history to win the Finals MVP and league MVP back-to-back along with Jordan. Overall, the Miami Heat 2012–13 season is considered one of the most historic runs in NBA history.

=== 2013–2014: Final year as the Big Three ===
In the offseason, the Heat focused on retaining their team outside the Big 3. Ray Allen and Rashard Lewis opted into their contracts for an extra year. Mario Chalmers picked up the team option for another year with the team. James Jones stayed on the team after mulling over retirement. During the 2013 NBA draft, the Heat traded a second round pick for forward-guard James Ennis, the 50th pick. Udonis Haslem is to have surgery on his knee after tearing his meniscus during the regular season. Chris Andersen was re-signed to a one-year deal with the Heat. Mike Miller was released via the amnesty clause, which would save the Heat upwards to $40 million in the luxury tax. Greg Oden, the first pick in the 2007 NBA draft, signed to a one-year deal at the league minimum. Michael Beasley, who was formerly drafted by the Heat with the 2nd overall pick in the 2008 NBA draft, was signed to a 1-year contract. The Heat began with a 22–6 record, the best start in franchise history. However, the 2013–14 season was full of struggle for the Heat. Their struggles against other top teams continued in a similar fashion as the 2010–11 season. They suffered an 0–4 regular season sweep against the Brooklyn Nets, three of them by one point and one went into overtime in Brooklyn. They also went 0–2 when playing against the Chicago Bulls on the road at the United Center in Chicago and 0–2 against the Indiana Pacers when playing against them in Bankers Life Fieldhouse in Indianapolis. Addressing the Heat's struggles, a number of Heat players admitted that the team had lacked the necessary motivation and energy. Fourth quarter woes were also to blame (as in the past), with the Heat often failing to keep the lead for four quarters. Much was also talked about Mario Chalmers' poor play, often becoming the target of berating from LeBron, Wade and Bosh dubbed the "little brother" of the Heat. During a home game against the Indiana Pacers on December 18, 2013, LeBron and Mario Chalmers got into a near-altercation after exchanging words during a timeout in the third quarter. Chalmers gave LeBron some words, in turn LeBron made a leap as if to physically do something, until he was restrained by Udonis Haslem. James later apologized court side to Chalmers as well as on Twitter stating it was "wrong" of him. LeBron also suffered a nose injury during a game against Oklahoma City on February 20. He returned with an unusual black nose mask on February 27 during a home game against the New York Knicks, he retained a high performance and Miami won 108–82. During a home game against the Charlotte Bobcats, LeBron James had a career-high 61 points. His 61-points was also a franchise high, breaking Glen Rice's 56-point franchise record, set in 1995 against the Orlando Magic. The Heat concluded the season with a 54–28 regular season record, the second seed in the much weakened-Eastern Conference, the lowest record in the big three era. In the playoffs, they swept over the 7th-seed Charlotte Bobcats in the first round. It became the second consecutive sweep of the Big 3 era. In the conference semifinals. The Heat found themselves against a rival that swept them during the regular season: Brooklyn Nets. As the Heat won the first two games at home, Brooklyn won Game 3, ending the Heat's six-game winning streak of the postseason. Fortunately, James had a career-high 49 points to lead the Heat to victory in Game 4 on the road. Back at home, the Heat avenged their regular season sweep loss over the Nets in Game 5. Moving on, the Heat faced another rematch against the Indiana Pacers in the Eastern Conference finals and their third consecutive playoff encounter. Pacer head coach Frank Vogel made it plain that the Pacers felt, if Game 7 was at Indiana, they would have beaten Miami, so they strove to get the number one seed in the east. The Pacers blew out the Heat in Game 1, but lost down the stretch in Game 2, 3, and 4. They avoided elimination in Game 5, with James facing foul trouble and career lows in points and minutes played. Much was made about Lance Stephenson's antics throughout the series, from blowing on James' ear to slamming his hand at Norris Cole's face. In Game 6, despite taking a 9–2 lead early in the first quarter, the Pacers were subsequently blown out for the rest of the way; Miami would reach the Finals for the fourth straight year, joining the Boston Celtics and the Los Angeles Lakers as only the third franchise to achieve such a feat. In the Finals the Miami Heat would face the San Antonio Spurs in another much-expected rematch. However the Miami Heat would fail to achieve their goal of a three-peat, and like their 2011 loss to the Mavericks, would end up falling in the rematch against the Spurs, although in a brutal five-game sweep in which the Heat lost by 15 points or more in each loss. During Game 1, the Heat players suffered dehydration due to an air conditioning failure at the AT&T Center in San Antonio and in particular LeBron was unable to stay in the game because of cramping leading to the internet/Twitter meme referring to him as "LeCramp" and the oxymoron slogan "too hot for the Heat". After winning Game 2 in San Antonio, Miami lost the next three games including two straight home losses in Game 3 and Game 4. It would be the Heat's first postseason loss ever since their loss to the Dallas Mavericks in 2011. On July 11, 2014, LeBron James announced he had decided to return to Cleveland leaving Wade and Bosh to continue on without him.

== 2014–2019: Post-Big Three era and Wade's final years ==
=== 2015: Missing the Playoffs ===
Much like the Cleveland Cavaliers during the 2014 off-season, the Heat focused on how it would maintain and remain a top-contender without LeBron James. However, rather than firing key members and rebuilding, the Heat kept much of its roster together and re-tooled. Despite the departure of James, the off-season for the Heat marked the return of a number of key veterans and the arrival of new stars embarking on a hopeful note for the Heat. Chris Bosh signed to a hefty $115 million contract for five years. Dwyane Wade also re-signed for a two-year contract. Mario Chalmers, Udonis Haslem and Chris Andersen also returned, however James Jones went to go join LeBron in Cleveland. The Heat also signed free-agents Luol Deng from the Cleveland Cavaliers, Danny Granger from the Los Angeles Clippers and Josh McRoberts from the then Charlotte Bobcats. The Heat also acquired 2014 draftee Shabazz Napier. Because of the Heat's off-season handling of James's departure, the Heat still remained by multiple sports analysts to remain a top contender in the east.

Despite a hopeful 3–0 start for the Heat, they struggled and went 9–12 at the beginning of the season. After that, they went through an alternating pattern of wins and losses and suffered injury problems. On December 15, 2014 Chris Bosh was sidelined due to a strained calf. On December 23 it was announced that Josh McRoberts would be out for the rest of the season, despite successful surgery on his injured knee. The Heat was granted $2.65 million worth of salary cap space after filing for a disabled player exception. On December 25 on Christmas Day, LeBron made his first return to Miami as a member of the Cavaliers. The Heat had compiled tribute videos for LeBron and James Jones. In contrast to LeBron's return to Cleveland as a member of the Heat on December 3, 2010; he received high standing ovations from the fans. Thanks to impressive performances by Wade and Deng, the Heat beat the Cavaliers 101–91 compiling one of their best wins of the season. Wade had 31 points, while LeBron had 30. Eventually, the Heat would sign 2010 second round pick Hassan Whiteside. Whiteside has become a huge contribution to the Heat, and has broken Alonzo Mourning's record of 9 blocks in a game in which Whiteside had 12 blocks and 13 boards along with 14 points in a winning effort against the Chicago Bulls.

On February 19, 2015, the Heat traded Norris Cole to the New Orleans Pelicans, and acquired Goran Dragić from the Phoenix Suns and his brother Zoran Dragić for Danny Granger. On February 21, Bosh was sidelined for the rest of the season due to blood clots in his lungs.

At the end of the season, the Heat failed to make the Playoffs despite efforts to keep their post-season hopes alive. They finished with a 37–45 regular season record, the NBA's 10th worse record. This would be the second time in Wade's career ever since 2007–08 season to miss the post-season. The Heat concluded their 2014–15 season with a 105–101 road victory over the Philadelphia 76ers.

=== 2015–16 season ===
During the 2015 free-agency period, the Heat acquired veteran Amar'e Stoudemire to a one-year deal and rookie Justise Winslow from Duke University. The Heat also re-signed Wade and Dragić.

Dragić extended his terms to a 5-year contract. Luol Deng exercised his player option for the 2015–16 season. On February 27, 2016, the Heat signed former 7-time All-Star Joe Johnson. After leading scorer Chris Bosh was ruled out for the rest of the season following All-Star Weekend for the second year in a row due to blood clots, Deng, Dragic and Wade all stepped up to lead the Heat through the rest of the season. Joe Johnson signed with Miami and started at small forward with Deng at power forward adding points and 3pt scoring for Miami. The Heat beat the Cleveland Cavaliers 122–101 on March 19. In March, 2nd round rookie Josh Richardson shot over 60% from 3pt range helping the Heat off the bench. Whiteside was removed from the starting lineup in favor of Amare Stoudemire to add spark for the Heat bench alongside Richardson, fellow rookie Justice Winslow, and Gerald Green. In the last game of the season, the Heat lost to the Boston Celtics, despite being up by 26 points at halftime, and ended their season with a 48–34 record. Although they had the same record as the Atlanta Hawks, Celtics, and Charlotte Hornets, the Heat clinched the third seed of the playoffs gaining home court advantage against the Hornets.

Against the Hornets, the Heat won the first two games in blowout wins 123–91 and 115–103 respectively. After Charlotte won game 3 and 4. Dwyane Wade shot 10–20 from the field scoring 23 points, 4 assists, 3 blocks, and 2 steals securing a game 7 at home. Miami won game 7 against the Hornets after an amazing 25 point performance from Goran Dragic. In the eastern semi-finals against the Toronto Raptors, the Heat won game one in overtime but lost game 2 and 3 despite a 38-point performance from Wade in game 3. Defensive presence Hassan Whiteside who averaged 3.8 blocks a game as well as over 10 rebounds was lost due to injury. Miami won game 4 at home and lost game 5 in Toronto. Dwyane Wade led the way to a game 6 victory leading to a game 7 in Toronto. The Heat lost game 7 in a blowout loss to the second-seeded Raptors after losing Chris Bosh and Whiteside.

==== Departure of Dwyane Wade ====
The 2016 free-agency, saw multiple franchise players leaving their teams in pursuits of championships, with Wade being no exception. After failing to sign Kevin Durant (who joined the Golden State Warriors), the focus shifted to the seemingly boiling relationship issues and disagreements between Dwyane Wade and Heat president Pat Riley, mostly over contract negotiations. Wade had demanded a 2-year contract worth $50 million and rejected a $42 million offer from Riley.

On July 6, Wade announced that he was leaving the Heat to go join his hometown Chicago Bulls. Wade stated that he felt under-appreciated by the Heat's handling of free-agency, by placing Kevin Durant and Hassan Whiteside over him. Pat Riley responded to Wade's decision with an emotional text.

=== 2018–19 season: End of the Dwyane Wade era ===
After spending the 2017-18 season with the Cleveland Cavaliers, the Los Angeles Lakers, Dwyane Wade decided to return to the Miami Heat for the 2018-19 season, after missing some games following his daughter's birth. On April 9, 2019, Wade played his last home game in Miami, scoring 30 points. In his final game the following night, Wade recorded his fifth career triple-double with 25 points, 11 rebounds, and 10 assists. Wade's #3 jersey was retired on February 22, 2020.

== 2019–2023: Return to the NBA Finals ==
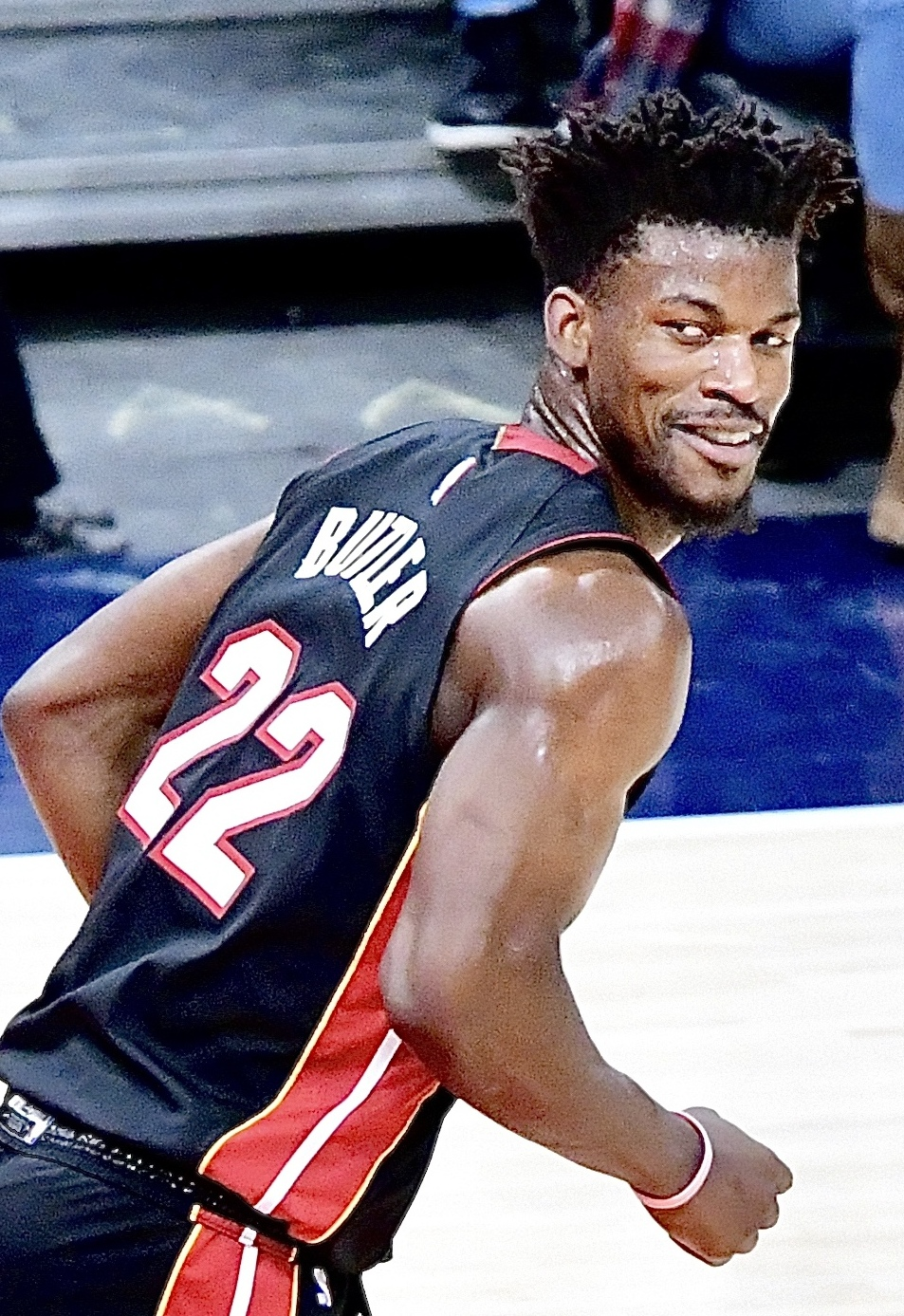
Jimmy Butler led the Heat to two surprise Finals Appearances in 2020 and 2023

=== 2019–20: Eastern Conference champions ===
Jimmy Butler signed with the Heat before the 2019-20 season. Butler was named the Eastern Conference Player of the week on December 9, 2019. Bam Adebayo made his first All Star Team. The Heat would eventually face the heavily favored Milwaukee Bucks, led by league MVP Giannis Antetokounmpo, in the second round. However, to the surprise of some, the Heat would upset the Bucks in five games. For the first time in six years, the Heat made a Finals comeback after defeating the Boston Celtics in the Eastern Conference finals. After playing six games with their Game 3 and Game 5 victories, the Heat finished the season as runners-up after losing to the Los Angeles Lakers in the NBA Finals.

=== 2020–21: First round sweep ===
The Heat would once again face the Milwaukee Bucks. This time though they would be swept despite beating them in five games the year prior. Even though they lost Game 1 in overtime, the next three games would all be blowouts as they got swept by the eventual champions.

=== 2021–22: 1st seed in the East ===
The Heat would come back strong from getting swept last year. With the help of the additions of Kyle Lowry and P.J. Tucker the Heat finished 53–29 to secure the first seed in the east for only the fourth time in franchise history. The Heat would beat the Atlanta Hawks in five games, and beat the Philadelphia 76ers in six. The Heat then returned to the Eastern Conference finals for the second time in three seasons with a rematch against the Boston Celtics. However, they lost the series in seven games. In Game 7 of the Eastern Conference Finals series, Butler missed a potential game-winning 3-pointer.

=== 2022–23: History in the making ===
After being 1st in the East in the 2021-2022 NBA season, the Heat played mediocre basketball all season long finishing the regular season with a 44–38 record, placing them 7th in the regular season standings. However, in their first play-in game, they lost to the Atlanta Hawks, who eventually clinched the 7th seed in the playoffs. The Heat did manage to defeat the Chicago Bulls in the last play-in game to clinch the 8th seed in the Playoffs, allowing them to face the Milwaukee Bucks in the playoffs for the third time in the four seasons. There was little optimism by the National media that the Heat could do any damage in the playoffs, as Milwaukee entered the playoffs with the best record in the NBA. Miami went ahead and dismantled the Bucks in five games, and in doing so became the sixth no. 8 seeded team to eliminate a no. 1 seeded team, as well as the first play-in team to do so. Along the way, Jimmy Butler scored his career-high 56 points in Game 5, which also broke the franchise record for the most points in a single NBA playoff game, surpassing LeBron James (49 points in Game 4 of the 2014 Eastern Conference semifinals). The series was seen as eerily similar to the Heat's five-game upset of the Bucks three years prior. The Heat would then move onto the New York Knicks, revisiting the old rivalry. The Heat eliminated the Knicks in 6 games. In the Eastern Conference Finals, the Heat would face another old playoff foe in the Boston Celtics for the sixth time. The Heat got out to a 3–0 lead, before inexplicably losing the next three games in row and letting the Celtics force a game 7 in Boston. Once again the national media gave the Heat no hope of winning game 7 on the road, and they were going to become the first team in NBA history to blow a 3-0 playoff lead. In game 7 the Heat got out to a hot start and never looked back as they defeated the Celtics 103-84 and in doing so won the first game 7 on the road in franchise history. Miami also became the second 8th seed team to reach the NBA Finals. Jimmy Butler was named Eastern Conference Finals MVP by a narrow vote between him and Caleb Martin. The Heat went on to lose to the Denver Nuggets in five games. In Game 3 of the Finals, Udonis Haslem came off the bench with 29.8 seconds left in the game, became the oldest player, aged 42 years and 363 days, to play in the NBA Finals. Haslem retired after the Heat lost the NBA Finals series to the Denver Nuggets.

== 2023–2026: Butler's and Herro's final years ==
=== 2023-24: First Round loss ===
In the 2023–24 season, The Heat finished as the 8th seed once again, but due to injuries to Jimmy Butler, the Heat were gentlemen swept by The Celtics. Bam Adebayo represented Miami in his third All Star Season.

=== 2024-25: Jimmy Butler trade ===
On February 6, 2025, during the 2025 blockbuster trade period, the Heat traded Jimmy Butler to the Golden State Warriors in exchange for first-round picks in 2025 as well as second-round picks in 2028 and 2031. Upon the trade, the Heat acquired two guards Andrew Wiggins and Kyle Anderson are both from San Francisco, also added Toronto Raptors point guard Davion Mitchell, and shooting guard Josh Richardson has been waived by Utah Jazz.

== 2026–present: Giannis Antetokounmpo era ==
On July 6, 2026, the Miami Heat acquired Giannis Antetokounmpo alongside Bobby Portis has joined the team in exchange for Tyler Herro, Kel'el Ware, Jaime Jaquez Jr., Kasparas Jakučionis, the rights to Nate Ament and four more future draft picks.
